= Arque (disambiguation) =

Arque may refer to:

- Arque, location in the Cochabamba Department, Bolivia
- Arque Municipality, municipal section of the Arque Province in the Cochabamba Department, Bolivia
- Arque Province, rural province in Cochabamba Department in the South American state of Bolivia
- Arque River, one of the headwaters of Río Grande and Mamoré River in Bolivia
