= April 1969 =

Month of 1969

<<	April 1969					>>
Su	Mo	Tu	We	Th	Fr	Sa
		1	2	3	4	5
6	7	8	9	10	11	12
13	14	15	16	17	18	19
20	21	22	23	24	25	26
27	28	29	30

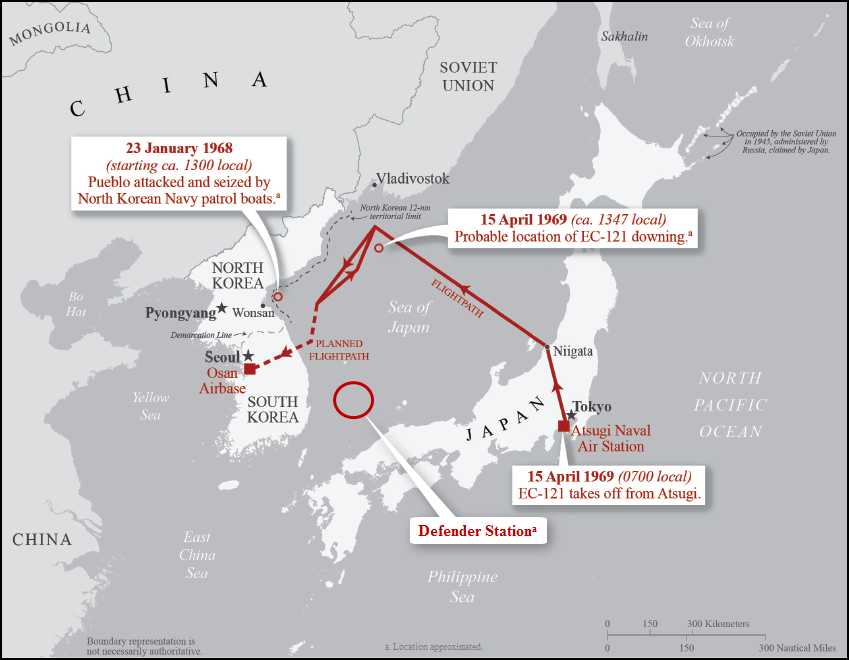
April 15, 1969: North Korea shoots down American spy plane over international waters

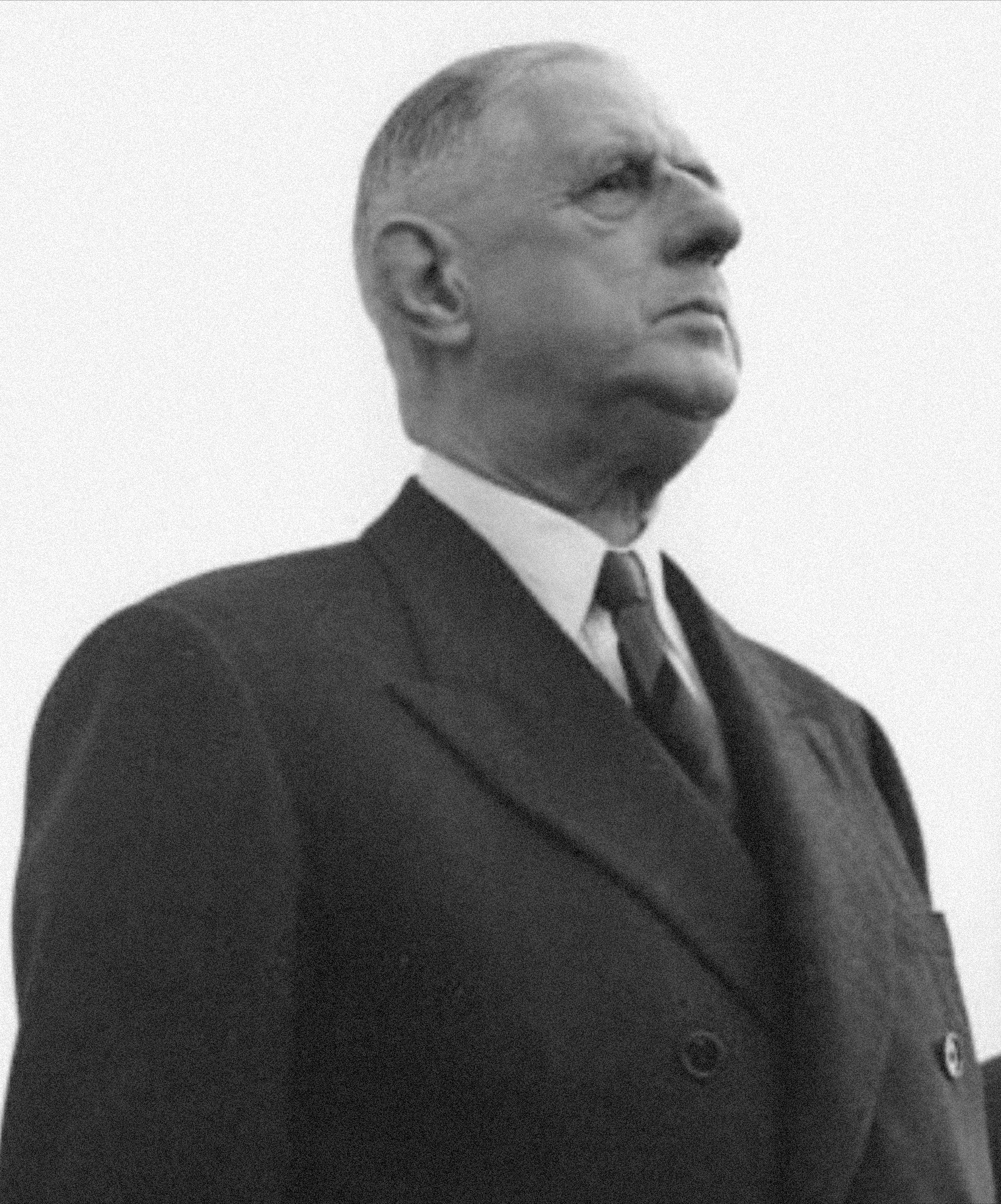
April 28, 1969: France's President de Gaulle resigns after voters reject his plan

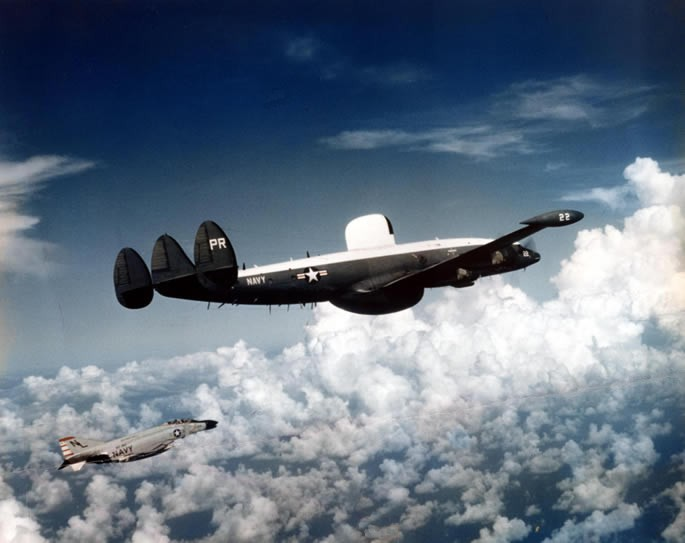
A similar EC-121M spyplane

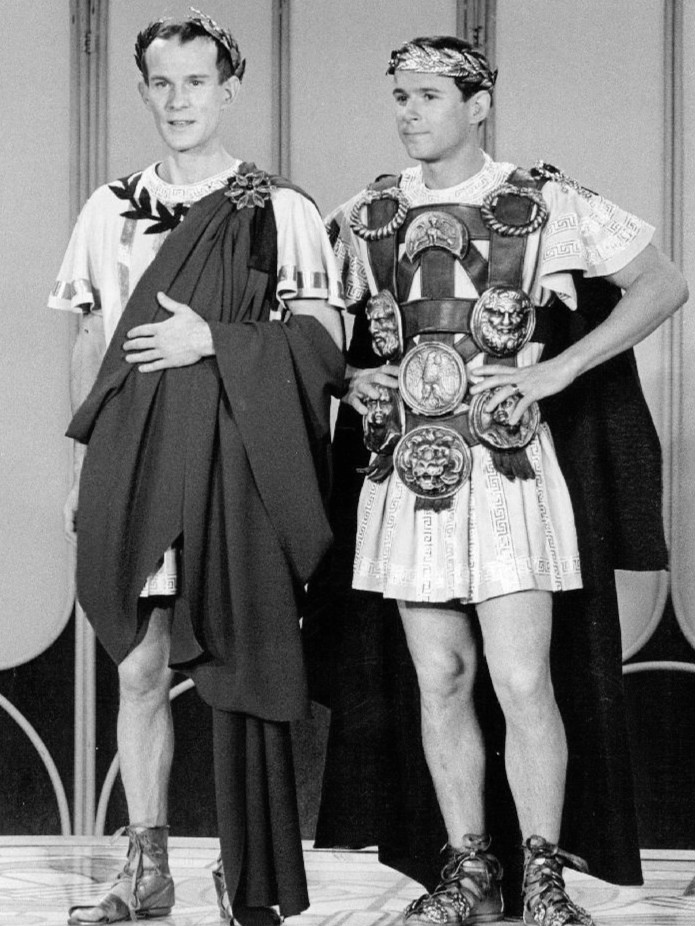
April 4, 1969: CBS cancels the popular Smothers Brothers' show

The following events occurred in April 1969:

== April 1, 1969 (Tuesday) ==
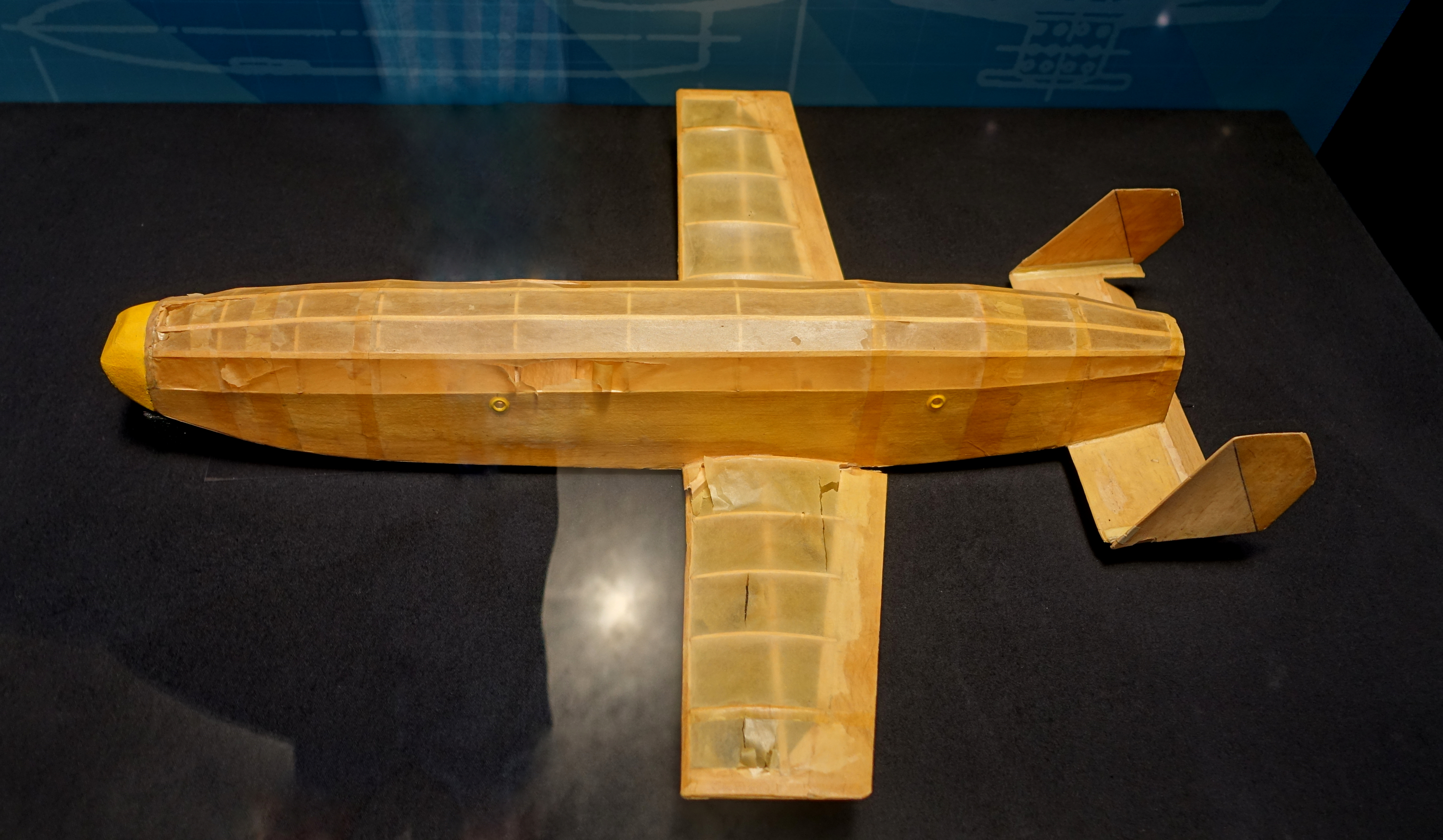
The original Space Shuttle design

- At Houston, NASA Engineer Max Faget showed 20 colleagues a small balsa wood and paper model with "straight, stubby wings and a shark-like nose" and told them. "We're going to build America's next spacecraft. It's going to launch like a spacecraft; it's going to land like a plane." Faget, the director of engineering and development at the Manned Space Center, was introducing the assembled group to a planned reusable spacecraft, the American Space Shuttle.
- Meeting in Stevenson, Washington, the Board of County Commissioners of Skamania County voted to enact county ordinance Number 69-01, making either an April Fool's Day joke or the first official recognition by any government agency of the possibility of the existence of "Bigfoot". Whether intended as humorous or not, the ordinance was published in the April 4 and April 11 issues of the weekly Skamania County Pioneer, a requirement under state law, and was amended again in 1984. The text of the 1969 enactment noted "evidence to indicate the possible existence" in the county of an ape-like creature, a large number of "purported recent sightings" and "an influx of scientific investigators as well as casual hunters, many armed with lethal weapons", and was passed to discourage "laxity in the use of firearms" that posed a threat to "persons living or traveling within the boundaries of Skamania County", and made slaying of the creature described as "Sasquatch", "Yeti" or "Bigfoot" a felony punishable by a $10,000 fine and/or five years imprisonment.
- The 9th National Congress of the Chinese Communist Party opened in Beijing, with 1,512 delegates appearing for 24 days of meetings. Lin Biao, the vice-chairman of the party, Vice-Premier of China and Defense Minister, delivered the opening address and was accepted later in the Congress as the official successor to Chairman Mao Zedong. The Congress was the first in almost 14 years.
- The Harrier GR1, a jet fighter with vertical takeoff and landing capability, entered military service for the first time, with the original Harrier jets becoming part of Britain's Royal Air Force fleet at RAF Wittering. The Harrier had first flown on December 28, 1967.
- Born:
  - Andrew Vlahov, Australian pro basketball player for the National Basketball League Perth Wildcats, inductee to the Australian Basketball Hall of Fame, 1991 NBL rookie of the year and 1995 Grand Finals MVP; in Perth
  - Fadl Chaker, Lebanese singer who was later convicted in absentia by Lebanon's government of terrorism; in Sidon

== April 2, 1969 (Wednesday) ==
- The Communist Party of Czechoslovakia, "apparently bowing to a Soviet ultimatum", reluctantly announced strict censorship of the Czechoslovak news media, and the government's Ministry of the Interior issued new regulations. The CTK government news agency issued a statement saying that punishment awaited any newspaper or broadcast report that did not "proceed in harmony with the interests of the domestic and foreign policy of the State", and that the government "expressed its regret and apologies" to the USSR for instances where a mood of "anti-Soviet hysteria" had been created by the press.
- All 51 people aboard LOT Polish Airlines Flight 165 were killed when the Antonov An-24 crashed into a mountain slope during its scheduled flight from Warsaw to Kraków. With visibility low in a snowstorm, and the pilot well off course, the propeller-driven airplane impacted with the 4,491 feet (1,369 m) Polica Mountain at an altitude of 3,937 feet (1,200 m), after flying 50 miles (80 km) past its destination and impacting in the mountains above the town of Zawoja.
- Twenty-three South Vietnamese soldiers and an American pilot were killed when their CH-47 Chinook combat helicopter crashed north of the abandoned Khe Sanh combat base, and another 53 soldiers were injured. The 77 people on board were flying into combat when a rotor of the Chinook struck a tree and brought the aircraft down in what was described as "the costliest helicopter crash of the war".
- Born: Ajay Devgn, Indian Hindi cinema actor and two-time National Film Award Best Actor winner; in New Delhi

== April 3, 1969 (Thursday) ==
- Lieutenant General Joseph A. Ankrah resigned as President of Ghana after the revelation of a financial scandal that showed that Ankrah had accepted money from foreign interests in return for favors. The National Liberation Council required him to resign from his post as chairman and retire from the Ghanaian Army. Ankrah was replaced by Brigadier General Akwasi Afrifa, who would allow parliamentary elections on August 29.
- The U.S. Department of Defense announced that the death toll for American soldiers in the Vietnam War had exceeded the 32,629 who had died in the Korean War, based on 312 additional deaths during the week from March 22 to March 28 to bring the toll to 33,641. The Vietnam War became the "fourth bloodiest war in American history" on March 26.
- The Mass of Paul VI, also known as the Novus Ordo, was promulgated in the Roman Catholic Church by the Pope, creating the most commonly used liturgy by Catholics. Its liturgical books would be published in 1970, and revised by Paul VI in 1975. Revised again by Pope John Paul II in 2000, they would be revised a third time by John Paul IIin 2002. The Novus Ordo largely displaced the Tridentine Mass. The editions of the Mass of Paul VI Roman Missal (1970, 1975, 2002) are titled Missale Romanum ex decreto Sacrosancti Oecumenici Concilii Vaticani II instauratum ("The Roman Missal renewed by decree of the Most Holy Second Ecumenical Council of the Vatican").
- Born:
  - Ben Mendelsohn, Australian film and TV actor, 2016 Emmy Award winner for best supporting actor in Bloodline; in Melbourne
  - Lance Storm (ring name for Lance Evers), Canadian professional wrestler; in Sarnia, Ontario

== April 4, 1969 (Friday) ==
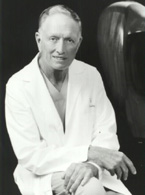
Dr. Cooley

- Dr. Denton Cooley implanted the first temporary artificial heart, in an operation at St. Luke's Episcopal Hospital in Houston. The recipient was 47-year-old Haskell Karp of Skokie, Illinois, whose diseased heart was removed from his chest and replaced by the Liotta TAH plastic and fabric mechanical pump, developed by Dr. Domingo Liotta. Sixty-five hours after the implantation of the mechanical heart, Karp received a donor heart from a 40-year-old woman whose body had been flown in from Lawrence, Massachusetts. However, Karp survived only 32 hours after the new heart was implanted, before he succumbed to pneumonia caused by Pseudomonas bacteria; another artificial heart implant would not take place until 1981.
- Popular, but controversial, The Smothers Brothers Comedy Hour was abruptly canceled by the CBS television network. CBS President Robert Wood explained that the show's two producers, Dick Smothers and Tommy Smothers, "consistently had failed to deliver tapes" of their programs in time for CBS executives and local TV stations to review the content, and added that it was "abundantly clear" that the brothers were "unwilling to accept the criteria of taste established by the network's program practices department."
- Also popular and controversial, singer Jim Morrison of The Doors appeared with his attorney before the Los Angeles office of the FBI to answer federal charges of "interstate flight to avoid prosecution" in relation to his indecent exposure at his March 1 concert in Miami. By arrangement, Morrison was arrested and immediately released upon posting of a $5,000 bond. By then, The Doors' 1969 concert dates had been canceled and the group was blacklisted by the Concert Hall Managers' Association.
- Born: William Maurice "Mo" Cowan, American lawyer and interim United States Senator for five months for Massachusetts in 2013; in Yadkinville, North Carolina

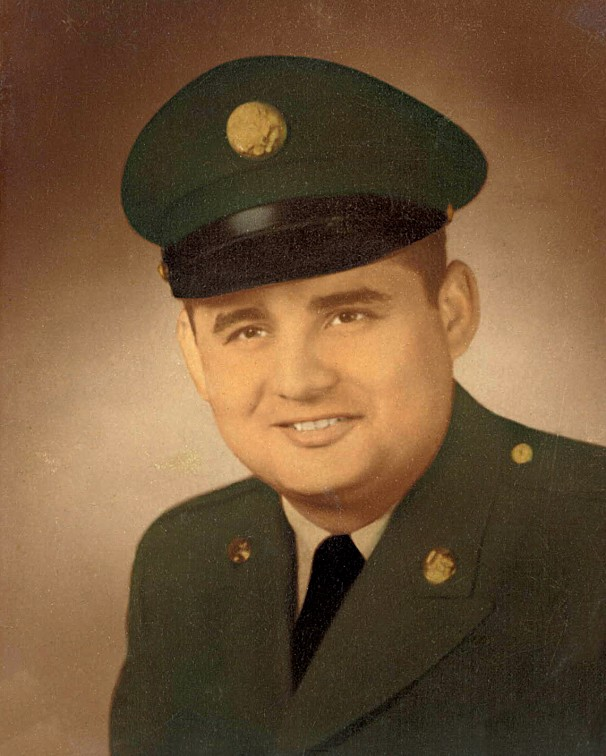
Staff Sgt. Falcón

- Died: U.S. Army Staff Sergeant Félix Conde Falcón, 31, was killed in the Vietnam War while leading a charge against a large complex of enemy bunkers at Ap Tan Hoa. Almost 35 years later, the case of the Puerto Rican non-commissioned officer would be reviewed and Falcón would be awarded the Medal of Honor for his bravery.

== April 5, 1969 (Saturday) ==
- Rescuers in Sweden saved all 18 skiers who had been buried in an avalanche at the Riksgränsen ski resort, although three were injured critically. The group, who were part of a group of tourists taking part in a slalom competition, were buried in the snow for up to an hour as hundreds of police from surrounding towns in Sweden and Norway searched for the group. Rescue dogs were able to dig the tourists out.
- A sniper killed four people at random and wounded 16 more on a section of the Pennsylvania Turnpike as he pulled off to the shoulder of the westbound lanes and fired at passing cars with an army carbine and a .30 caliber rifle. After killing a man and woman near the Highspire Service Area, Donald Lambright (the son of comedian Stepin Fetchit) killed his wife and then himself.
- Died: Rómulo Gallegos, 84, Venezuelan politician who was elected President of Venezuela in 1948, but was overthrown in a military coup nine months after taking office.

== April 6, 1969 (Sunday) ==
- The crash of the Taiwanese freighter Union Faith killed 25 crew in a fiery crash on the Mississippi River beneath the Greater New Orleans Bridge. The freighter, with 51 men on board, collided head-on with a set of three linked oil-laden barges that were being pushed by the tugboat Warren Doucet, causing the lead barge to split in two and set fire to its cargo of 9,000 barrels of crude oil.
- Born:
  - Paul Rudd, American film actor known for portraying Ant-Man in Marvel films; in Passaic, New Jersey
  - Bret Boone, American MLB baseball player and winner of four Gold Glove Awards and two Silver Slugger Awards; in El Cajon, California
  - Louie Spence, English dancer, choreographer and TV personality; in Ponders End, Enfield
- Died: Gabriel Chevallier, 73, French satirical novelist and author of the 1934 book Clochemerle

== April 7, 1969 (Monday) ==
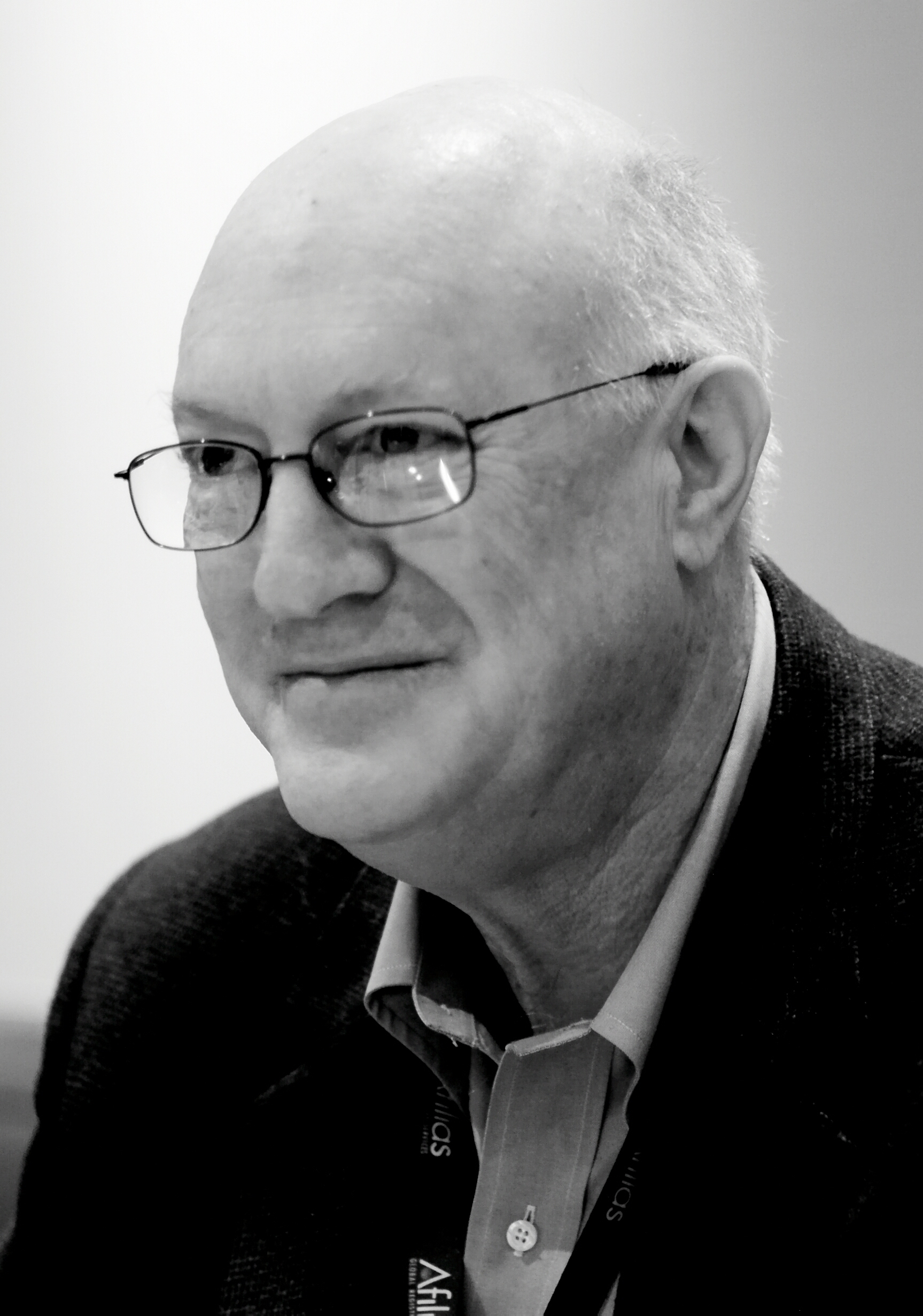
Crocker in 2007

- UCLA graduate student and computer scientist Steve Crocker wrote and circulated the very first Request for Comments (RFC) publication to be circulated among the Network Working Group (Crocker, Jeff Rulifson and Bill Duvall of Stanford Research Institute, and Steve Carr of Utah) that was developing the communication protocols for the upcoming ARPANET, the forerunner of the Internet. The very first RFC summarized the tentative agreements that the group had settled on for the Interface Message Processor (IMP) routers in the network sites, with initial messages being limited to 8,080 bits.
- The United States Supreme Court ruled in Stanley v. Georgia that the possession of obscene material was protected by the First Amendment to the U.S. Constitution. Writing for the majority, Justice Thurgood Marshall commented that "A state has no business telling a man, sitting alone in his house, what books he may read or what films he may watch", adding that individual state governments remained free to restrict public distribution of those materials.

== April 8, 1969 (Tuesday) ==
- All four of baseball's newest teams won their openers. The San Diego Padres debuted at home and beat the Houston Astros, 3 to 1, taking the field first in a half-filled stadium in front of an opening-day crowd of just 23,370. Dick Selma threw the first pitch and allowed only five hits, and Rafael Robles was the first to bat. The Kansas City Royals, bringing major league ball back to Kansas City after the Kansas City Athletics had moved to Oakland for 1968, beat the visiting Minnesota Twins, 4 to 3, before just 17,688 fans in a half-filled Municipal Stadium; the win came in the 12th inning as Joe Keough hit a single with the bases loaded; Lou Piniella was the first to bat for the Royals. Finally, the new Seattle Pilots (who would go bankrupt and become the Milwaukee Brewers the following year) won 4–3 at Anaheim to beat the California Angels; Tommy Harper batted first for the Pilots.
- The Montreal Expos defeated the New York Mets, 11 to 10, in what sportswriter Dick Young described as "the first international major league baseball game in history". The Expos, one of four new major league teams and MLB's first team from outside the United States, played the Mets at New York's Shea Stadium, and Montreal mayor Jean Drapeau tossed out the ceremonial first pitch; ten-year MLB veteran Maury Wills batted first for the Expos, who almost blew an 11–6 lead in the final inning. The result was not a sign of things to come; the Mets would win the 1969 World Series, while the Expos and the other new National League team, the San Diego Padres, would tie for MLB's worst win–loss record (52–110) in 1969.

== April 9, 1969 (Wednesday) ==
- Harvard University's Administration Building was seized by close to 300 students, mostly members of the Students for a Democratic Society. Shortly after midnight, the Harvard administrators called the Cambridge police and the Massachusetts State Police, and law enforcement officers charged in with billy clubs and pepper spray, arresting 184 people and injuring 45. Among those arrested was future Fox News journalist Chris Wallace, who "used his one phone call to contact the campus radio station", which recorded a first-hand account filed from behind bars.

== April 10, 1969 (Thursday) ==
- On the morning that he was preparing to overthrow the government of the Central African Republic, Lieutenant Colonel Alexandre Banza was arrested when he arrived at the army barracks at Camp Kassai. Banza, the Republic's former Finance Minister, had been betrayed by his confidant, Lieutenant Jean-Claude Mandaba, who had informed C.A.R. President Jean-Bédel Bokassa of the plot. Mandaba's soldiers seized Banza, who confessed under torture that he had intended to exile General Bokassa rather than kill him, confirmed by the written plans for the coup found in Banza's jacket pocket, which included the names of people whom he had planned to have served in his cabinet. A military tribunal convened at Camp de Roux in Bangui, found Banza guilty of treason, and had him executed by firing squad the next day.
- Charles de Gaulle announced in a live interview that he would resign as President of France if voters did not approve his referendum proposal for reducing the power of the French Senate and decentralizing the national government. "There cannot be the slightest doubt. On the reply the country makes to what I have asked it, will depend the continuation of my mandate or my immediate departure."
- NASA announced its choice for the crew of Apollo 12, the second crewed mission to the Moon, with Charles Conrad and Alan L. Bean to walk the lunar surface while Richard F. Gordon remained in the lunar orbiter.
- Died: Harley Earl, 75, American automobile designer for General Motors known for creating the Corvette and for introducing the "tailfin" to the automobile industry, peaking in popularity between 1955 and 1961.

== April 11, 1969 (Friday) ==
- The first test of using a designated hitter in baseball – a person who takes the place of the team's pitcher in the batting lineup – happened in a game in the minor Texas League, which was testing a rule allowing what it called a "wild card pinch hitter" (who could replace any player rather than just the pitcher). According to baseball researcher Kevin Saldana, the first person wild card pinch hitter was Paul Flesner of the Dallas–Fort Worth Spurs. Flesner had four at-bats in the Spurs' 8–5 loss to the visiting Amarillo Giants.
- The final first run episode of The Wild Wild West was broadcast, bringing an end to the western sci-fi hybrid series after four seasons. In "The Night of the Tycoons", Oscar-award-winning actress Jo Van Fleet was a formidable corporate villain against Robert Conrad's Secret Service agent character, Jim West.
- The Arab Liberation Front was founded in Iraq by Zeid Heidar of Iraq's Ba'ath Party, with the goal of representing Iraq's small Palestinian Arab population.
- Born:
  - Cerys Matthews, Welsh alternative rock singer and co-founder of the band Catatonia; in Cardiff
  - Chisato Eguchi (Chisato Moritaka), Japanese female pop singer and songwriter; in Ibaraki

== April 12, 1969 (Saturday) ==
- The Soviet Union revived the concept of the Subbotnik, a day when millions of Soviet citizens, particularly members of the Communist Party and their families, would do community service on a Saturday that they would normally not be required to work. The "All-Union Communist Subbotnik" (from Subotta for Saturday) came on the 50th anniversary of the first Subbotnik held on the weekend of April 11–12, 1919.
- Wales won the Five Nations Championship in rugby union play by scoring 27 points in the second half of the game against England to win 30–9. By beating England, Ireland and Scotland, Wales also won the rugby union "Triple Crown", in which one of the four "home nations" on the British Isles defeats the other three; a Welsh draw with the fifth nation, France, did not have any effect on winning the Crown.
- Seven of the 13-member crew of the Spanish trawler Gaztalupe were killed when their ship collided with the French trawler Olagorra and then sank in the North Sea, about 34 miles (55 km) from Scotland's Outer Hebrides islands, while two crewmen on the Olagorra were killed from the impact of the collision. Olagorra limped into port at Stornoway with two bodies and the six survivors of the Gaztalup.
- Born: Michael D. Jackson, American NFL wide receiver; in Tangipahoa, Louisiana (killed in motorcycle accident, 2017)

== April 13, 1969 (Sunday) ==
- West Germany's Communist Party, the DKP (Deutsche Kommunistische Partei), was relaunched after 13 years after the demise of the old KPD in 1956, as the 773 delegates to the first DKP Congress in Essen voted 770–0 (with three abstentions) to approve "a party platform stressing its nonrevolutionary nature", its lack of a relationship with East Germany's ruling Communist Party (the Socialist Unity Party of Germany or SED) and its plans to seek representation in democratic elections.
- Less than 24 hours before the scheduled shutdown of the United States railway system by a nationwide walkout of workers was scheduled to begin, the nation's major railroad companies reached an agreement with the 10,000-member Brotherhood of Railroad Signalmen. The pact came after a 28-hour bargaining session overseen by the National Mediation Board, averting a strike that was to have started at 6:01 Monday morning.
- Born: Harold Pruett, American television actor; in Anchorage, Alaska (died of drug overdose, 2002)

== April 14, 1969 (Monday) ==
- The Montreal Expos edged the visiting St. Louis Cardinals in the first regular season Major League Baseball game to be played outside the United States, playing before a standing room only crowd of 29,184 fans at Jarry Park Stadium. After 36 seasons in Montreal, the Expos would relocate in 2005 to become the Washington Nationals.
- Almost four years after becoming independent from the United Kingdom, and five months after abolishing the monarchy, the Republic of the Maldive Islands notified the United Nations that it was formally changing its name to the Republic of Maldives.
- The 24-game championship series of the World Chess Championship began in Moscow, with champion Tigran Petrosian defending his title against challenger Boris Spassky.

== April 15, 1969 (Tuesday) ==
- At 1:47 in the afternoon local time (0447 UTC), an unarmed American EC-121 reconnaissance aircraft was shot down by a North Korean MiG-21 jet fighter over the Sea of Japan, killing all 31 U.S. servicemen on board. Presented with a variety of options ranging from diplomatic protests to military retaliation (including a possible nuclear strike) against North Korea, U.S. President Nixon limited the American response to adding armed escorts for future spy plane flights and redeploying four aircraft carriers and other Seventh Fleet ships into the Sea of Japan for ten days. The bodies of Lt. (j.g.) Joseph R. Ribar and AT1 Richard E. Sweeney were recovered two days later from the sea, but none of the effects of the other 29 crewmen were found. In 2000, author Anthony Summers would write in his book, The Arrogance of Power: The Secret World of Richard Nixon, that White House insiders had told him that President Nixon had been intoxicated when he was informed of the EC-121 shootdown, and quoted former CIA employee George Carver as saying that "The Joint Chiefs were alerted and asked to recommend targets" for a tactical nuclear strike, but that "Kissinger got on the phone to them. They agreed not to do anything until Nixon sobered up."
- American aquanauts Ed Clifton, Conrad Mahnken, Richard Waller and John VanDerwalker returned to the surface of the ocean after having spent 58 days (since February 15) in the undersea laboratory and habitat Tektite I off of the U.S. Virgin Islands in a saturation diving environment. The group underwent more than 19 hours of decompression between the time of emerging from Tektite I and returning to dry land.
- First Lady Pat Nixon welcomed 4,702 members of the Daughters of the American Revolution for a reception at the White House, hosting its largest number of visitors since March 4, 1829, when new U.S. President Andrew Jackson invited the general public to come inside the presidential mansion. The 1829 event featured 26,000 people arriving in what would become known as the "Inaugural Brawl".
- Died: Queen Victoria-Eugenia, 81, Scottish-born member of British royalty who was Queen consort of Spain from the time of her marriage to King Alfonso XIII in 1906 until the abolition of the monarchy in 1931. Victoria-Eugenie had lived in exile in Switzerland since 1942, and was buried at Lausanne.

== April 16, 1969 (Wednesday) ==
- Americans who owned color televisions were cautioned by the U.S. government to stay at least 6 feet (1.8 m) away from their sets when watching TV, "and to stay away from the sides and the back of the set" because of unsafe levels of radiation. The United States Department of Health, Education and Welfare issued the warning after a report that 1,000 of 5,000 color TV sets in Suffolk County, New York "were emitting more than the accepted level of radiation" of 0.5 milliroentgens of x-ray and gamma ray radiation per hour.
- The Catholic Biblical Federation was founded by the Vatican following the initiative of Cardinal Johannes Willebrands and the late Cardinal Augustin Bea and with the encouragement of Pope Paul VI.

== April 17, 1969 (Thursday) ==
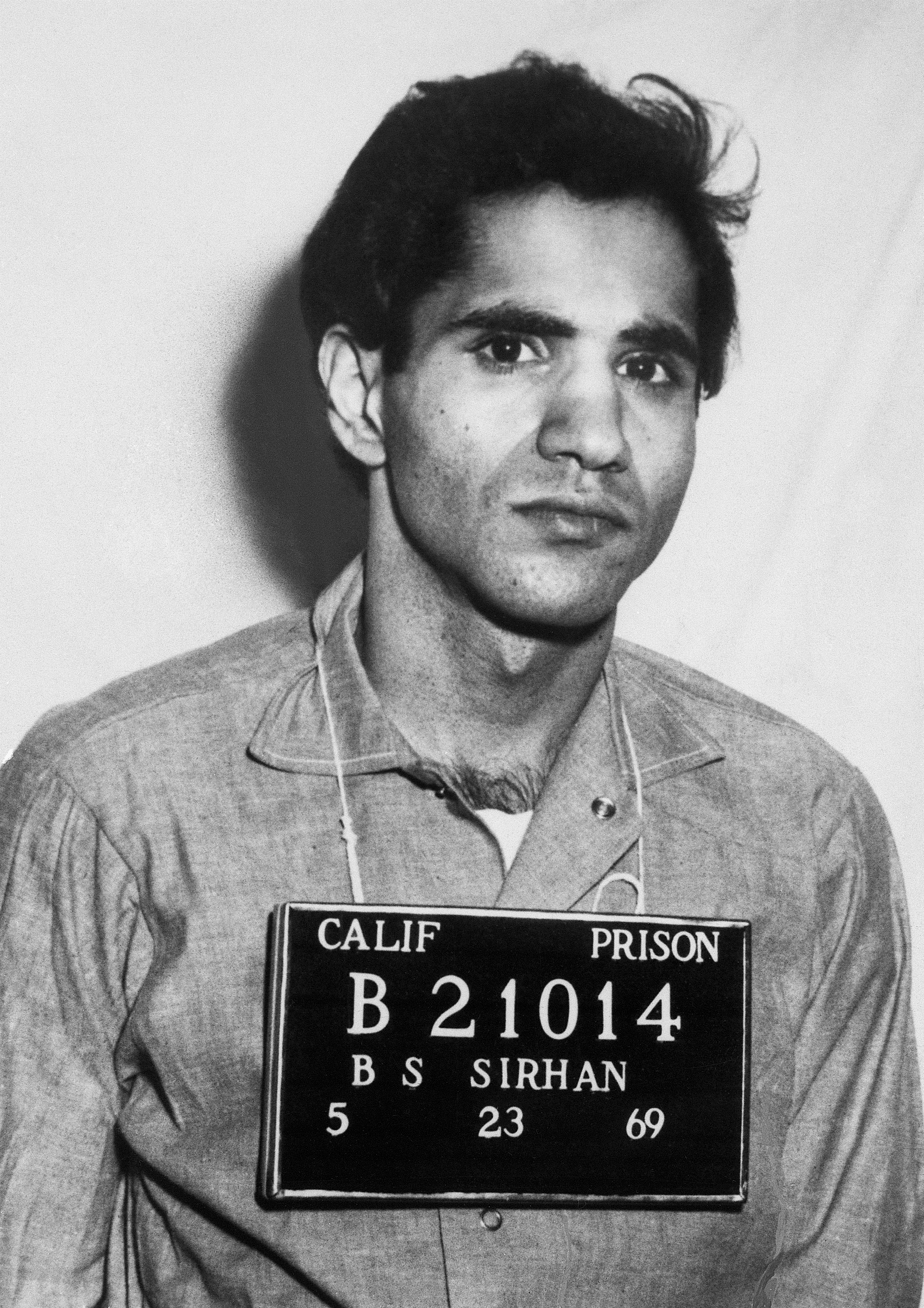
April 17, 1969: Sirhan Sirhan, charged with murder

- Sirhan Bishara Sirhan was convicted of the first-degree murder of U.S. Senator Robert F. Kennedy, ten months after the fatal shooting of Kennedy on June 5, 1968. After a trial that had lasted 14 weeks, a Los Angeles County Superior Court jury of seven men and five women deliberated (and asked Judge Herbert V. Walker for instructions relevant to second-degree murder) before returning the conviction, which carried with it a sentence of either life imprisonment or the death penalty. After almost 17 hours of deliberation (spread out over four days), the jury returned its verdict at 10:47 in the morning. Jurors also convicted Sirhan of five counts of assault with intent to kill for five bystanders who had been wounded in the shooting.

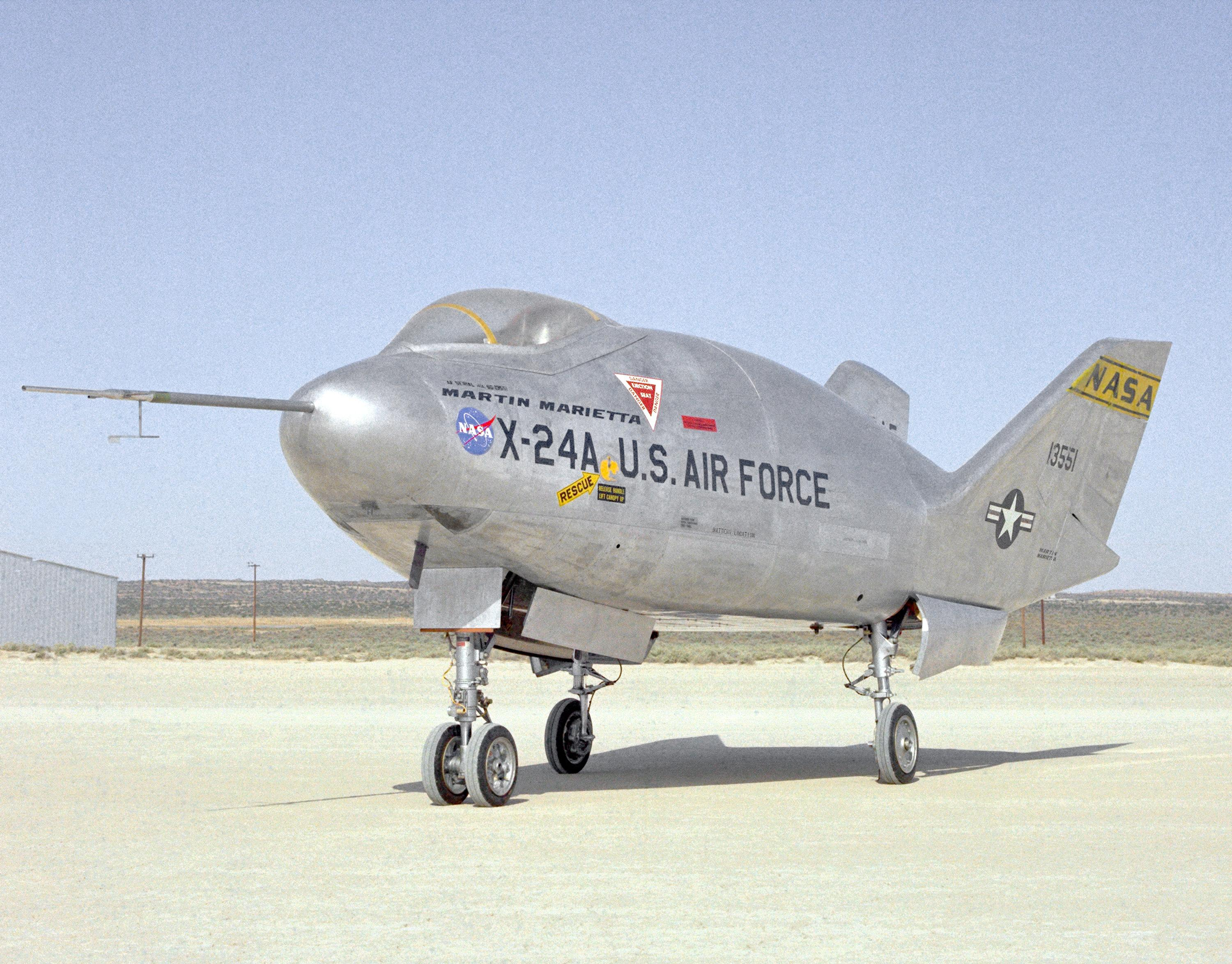
The "Flying Bathtub"

- The experimental Martin Marietta X-24 rocket plane was given its first unpowered reentry and landing test by the United States Air Force and NASA to perfect technology that would eventually be used by the Space Shuttle. USAF Major Jerauld R. Gentry guided the X-24A after it was dropped from a B-52 in the stratosphere at an altitude of 45,000 feet (14,000 m), and the wingless lifting body was maneuvered (including a full 180-degree turn) by Gentry over the next four minutes as it glided to the dry lake bed at Edwards Air Force Base at a speed of 250 miles per hour (400 km/h).
- Alexander Dubček, whose 1968 liberal reforms had been countered by an invasion of his nation by the Soviet Union and other Communist nations, was dismissed as First Secretary of the Communist Party of Czechoslovakia (KSČ) after 13 months. Dubček had continued to serve after the August invasion, albeit with restricted powers. The KSČ's 190-member Central Committee voted to dismiss him and to install Gustáv Husák of Slovakia's regional party as the new Party leader. Husák had been sentenced to life imprisonment in 1954 during the administration of Dubček's predecessor, Antonín Novotný, on charges of having participated in a "Trotskyite-Titoite-Zionist conspiracy" against the KSČ, but had been released in 1959 and politically rehabilitated.
- U.S. Army Spec. Fifth Class Thomas Van Putten was safely rescued more than a year after he had been declared missing in action, and 21 days after his March 28 escape from a Viet Cong prison camp, becoming the second of only two American prisoners of war to escape captivity during the Vietnam War. SP4 Van Putten had been operating a road grader for the 79th Engineer Group when he was captured in Tây Ninh province on February 10, 1968, and was promoted to SP5 while missing.
- The television pilot for Medical Center, a popular CBS medical drama that would run for seven seasons, was shown as U.M.C., a made-for-TV movie starring film tough-guy Edward G. Robinson as Dr. Lee Forestman, James Daly as Dr. Paul Lochner and Richard Bradford as Dr. Joe Gannon. The show would be picked up as a regular series on September 24, without Robinson, with Daly as the star and with Chad Everett taking over Bradford's role.
- British Prime Minister Harold Wilson informed the House of Commons that his government had "decided not to proceed further at this time with the Parliament (No. 2) Bill" intended to reduce the powers of the House of Lords.
- The voting age in the United Kingdom was lowered from 21 to 18 as the Representation of the People Act 1969 was given royal assent.

== April 18, 1969 (Friday) ==
- The new six-team American Association (AA), one of three Triple-A rated minor leagues that were at the highest level of Major League Baseball's farm clubs, held its opening day, and became the first to test the designated hitter rule that would be adopted by the American League in 1969. According to baseball researcher John Lewis, "the first true designated hitter in regular season professional baseball" (i.e., one substituting for a pitcher) was one of three people – Larry Osborne of the Omaha Royals who were first to bat in a 9 to 0 win over the Oklahoma City 89ers (whose pinch hitter was John Brandt), or Charles Weatherspoon of the Denver Bears, who lost to the Tulsa Oilers, 11–2. Each of the individuals was identified in box scores as "dph", the "designated pinch hitter", and none of the pitchers came to bat.
- The city of Northglenn, Colorado, was incorporated ten years after the first residents had purchased homes in a residential community planned by Perl-Mack Enterprises in Adams County near Denver. By 1961, the planned community had 10,000 residents, and spent the next years in legal action to prevent being annexed by the neighboring city of Thornton. The formal creation of the city came only ten days after an April 8 election when voters approved incorporation and elected the first city officials, with Hugh Danaby as North Glenn, Colorado's first mayor; the city would be renamed a year later. Within 40 years, Northglenn would have a population of almost 36,000.

== April 19, 1969 (Saturday) ==
- Three days after becoming the new Communist Party of Czechoslovakia leader, Gustáv Husák announced that the government would "fight without pity" against "anti-socialists" and "anti-Soviets", then implemented the new policy by having law enforcement forcibly disperse any large groups of young Czechoslovaks. Among the first to learn about the new rules (published in the KSČ newspaper, Rudé Právo) were 20 people whose get-together was broken up by police swinging clubs happened to be listening to a tape recorder. Foreign newspapers were confiscated from travelers at the border, and jamming of Radio Free Europe broadcasts went into effect immediately.
- Born:
  - Zsusza "Susan" Polgar, Hungarian-born chessmaster and the first woman to be named Grandmaster of the Year by the United States Chess Federation; in Budapest
  - Shannon Lee, American actress, singer, and martial artist, daughter of Bruce Lee and Linda Lee Cadwell; in Santa Monica, California
  - Dana Nessel, Attorney General of Michigan since 2019 and LGBT rights activist; in West Bloomfield Township, Michigan

== April 20, 1969 (Sunday) ==
- A grassroots movement of Berkeley community members seized an empty lot owned by the University of California, to begin the formation of "People's Park". The university had demolished all buildings on the block of Berkeley, California bounded by Telegraph, Haste, Bowditch and Dwight streets, leaving a vacant lot that had gone undeveloped for more than a year, so thousands of UC students and Berkeley residents – "hippies and freaks and Yippies and street people and politicos and radicals and peace activists and the Free Church of Berkeley and environmentalists and students and grad students and professors and architects and neighbors and their children" began landscaping. By May 15, the lot would have brick paths, flowers and trees, a playground and even an amphitheater. On May 15, the university would put a fence around the park and begin dismantling it, and the protests and response would escalate into a riot and the calling out of 2,000 state national guard troops.
- British Army troops already stationed in Ulster province in Northern Ireland were called for the first time to reinforce the local Royal Ulster Constabulary. The British Army already had 2,500 men from its Royal Irish Rangers infantry regiment, including an armored unit, stationed at St Patrick's Barracks in Ballymena and at Palace Barracks in Holywood, and a government spokesman in London emphasized that no additional troops would be sent from England, and that the British Army's role would be to guard reservoirs and power stations.
- U.S. President Nixon announced that he would order the withdrawal of 150,000 American troops from South Vietnam over the next 12 months in a gradual policy of "Vietnamization", putting more responsibility on the Army of the Republic of Viet Nam (ARVN). At the same time, Nixon was expanding the bombing of North Vietnam and had carried the war into Cambodia.
- For the first time in its 223-year history, Princeton University announced that it would admit women to its undergraduate program, starting with 130 "coeds" to begin the fall semester. Under the long-range plan, 375 more would be admitted in 1970, 550 in 1971, 630 in 1972 and 650 in 1973.
- Born:
  - Felix Baumgartner, Austrian skydiver widely known for jumping to Earth from a helium balloon from the stratosphere on October 14, 2012, setting the world record for skydiving an estimated 39 km (24 mi) and reaching an estimated top speed of 1,357.64 km/h (843.6 mph); in Salzburg (killed in paragliding accident, 2025)
  - Marietta Slomka, German television newscaster for the ZDF network; in Köln, West Germany
- Died: Benny Benjamin, 43, American jazz drummer who later became the recording studio drummer of Motown's R&B hits, died from a stroke after years of battling drug and alcohol addiction. Benjamin would be posthumously inducted into the Rock and Roll Hall of Fame.

== April 21, 1969 (Monday) ==
- The U.S. Supreme Court ruled, 6 to 3, that state-mandated waiting periods for receiving welfare benefits were unconstitutional because of the rules in 40 of the 50 states (usually mandating a one-year wait before receiving Aid to Families with Dependent Children or AFDC). Justice William J. Brennan Jr., wrote for the majority that the laws effectively prevented impoverished families from moving away from their state of residence, an impairment of the right of American citizens "to travel throughout the length and breadth of our land". Attorneys supporting the residency requirements forecast that the ruling would make more than 100,000 additional people eligible for assistance and would boost welfare expenses by an additional $125 million per year.
- In one of the few instances of a "fragging" where the perpetrator was caught and convicted, U.S. Marine First Lieutenant Robert T. Rohweller was fatally injured when a Marine under his command, Private Reginald F. Smith, tossed a fragmentation grenade into Rohweller's office at the Quang Tri Combat Base. Private Smith entered a guilty plea for murder and was sentenced to 40 years imprisonment.
- All 44 people on board an Indian Airlines flight from Agartala to Calcutta were killed as the Fokker F-27 airplane flew through severe thunderstorms during its brief flight in the airspace of East Pakistan. The plane went down near the city of Khulna.
- Chase, British Columbia, was incorporated as Canada's newest municipality, after having started in 1908 as a subdivision of land developed by the Adams River Lumber Company.
- Born: Toby Stephens, English stage, television and film actor; in Fitzrovia

== April 22, 1969 (Tuesday) ==
- According to a copyrighted story in the Houston Post, surgeon Conrad D. Moore had performed the first total transplant of an entire human eye. Dr. Moore carried out the surgical procedure at Houston Methodist Hospital, and attempted to connect the recipient's optic nerves to those from the donor eye in hopes of curing blindness. "We're hopeful of this man's having some uniting of his nerves, but we'll have to wait and see", Dr. Moore said but noted that the results would not be known for three weeks while the recipient's right eye eyelids remained sewed shut. Four days later, Dr. Moore admitted under questioning by the Houston Ophthalmological Society that he had only made a corneal transplant of the front portion of the donor eye, rather than totally replacing it. The patient, a photo shop owner in Conroe, Texas, would be released on May 12, able to move the new eye but without having regained any sight, though he would later claim that he had partial sight in the right eye and could see bright flashing light. Dr. Moore would be expelled from the ophthalmological society on June 9 and from the Harris County Medical Society on September 22.
- Robin Knox-Johnston became the first person to sail around the world alone and without taking on additional supplies or even approaching land. Knox-Johnston sailed his yacht, the Suhaili, into Falmouth, Cornwall, 312 days after his June 14, 1968 departure on the Sunday Times Golden Globe Race. By the time he returned to the cheers of thousands of onlookers at Falmouth and even more watching him on live television, Knox-Johnston had traveled 30,123 nautical miles (34,665 mi) (55,788 km). Up until he was sighted by a British tanker near the Azores on April 5, Knox-Johnston had not been seen or heard from for since November 20.
- Bill Clinton, a 22-year-old American Rhodes Scholar at the University of Oxford and future President of the United States, received an induction notice from Draft Board Number 26 in Hot Springs, Arkansas, directing him to return to the U.S. to begin military service; Clinton's friend, Cliff Jackson, would make a note of the date on his own calendar and recall Clinton asking him advice. Because the letter had arrived late, Clinton would receive a postponement of his reporting date, and would avoid induction by signing an agreement to enroll in the Army ROTC program at the University of Arkansas in 1970, although he would renege on that commitment.
- NASA Headquarters recommended that the palatability of food and water be enhanced for longer duration crewed flight. To accomplish this, a food development plan would be directed toward the following objectives: utilization of more conventional foods; resolution of stowage and preservation problems for inflight foods; development of facilities to enable more conventional food preparation and eating in space; and application of principles and practices already utilized by the food industry for commercial products.
- Northern Irish Prime Minister Terence O'Neill allowed for the 'One Man, One Vote' policy to be incorporated into the voting system of Northern Ireland. This abolished the unpopular Housing License voting requirement and gave no incentive for the county councils to discriminate against Catholic families in the distribution of council housing.
- Umuahia, the capital city of the breakaway Republic of Biafra for 18 months after the fall of Enugu, was recaptured by Nigerian Army troops of the First Nigerian Army Division, commanded by Colonel Mohammed Shuwa. The Nigerian Civil War, however, would continue for another nine months.
- John Lennon of The Beatles legally changed his name from "John Winston Lennon" to "John Ono Lennon" in honor of his new wife, Yoko Ono Lennon. Lennon told reporters, "Yoko changed her name for me; I've changed mine for her. It gives us nine O's between us, which is good luck."
- Died: Husain Bey Gouta, 76, the first and only Crown Prince of Tunisia after having been designated as the heir to the throne by King Muhammad VIII al-Amin when Tunisia became independent in 1956. After the abolition of the Tunisian monarchy in 1957, Husain Bey remained in Tunisia and was pretender to the throne from the last king's death in 1962 until his own death.

== April 23, 1969 (Wednesday) ==
- Oregon serial killer Jerome "Jerry" Brudos kidnapped and murdered his fifth and last victim, on the same day of the discovery of the body of a woman whom he had killed the day before. Over the course of a year, Brudos had abducted and strangled five women in northwest Oregon, all of whom were between the ages of 19 and 23, then mutilated their bodies. The body of Mrs. Janet Shanahan, 22, was found inside the trunk of her car, a 1951 Plymouth which had been stolen and abandoned in Eugene, where she was a student at the University of Oregon. The same day, Linda Salee, a 22 year old secretary, disappeared after driving to a shopping center in Portland; her body would be found in the Long Tom River on May 10. Two days later, a search of the Long Tom River found the body of Karen Sprinker, 19, an Oregon State University student who had been missing since March 27. Jerry Brudos, an electrician, would be arrested on June 2 and would eventually be convicted of three murders; he would die in prison in 2006.
- Six days after convicting Sirhan Sirhan of first-degree murder for the assassination of Robert F. Kennedy, the same 12-person Los Angeles jury completed its deliberations of which of the two penalties to impose as a sentence, and at 11:35 in the morning, announced that they had selected the death penalty, execution in the gas chamber at California's San Quentin State Prison. Sirhan, who showed no emotion upon hearing the sentence, reportedly told his defense attorney "Even Jesus Christ couldn't have saved me." Sirhan, however, would be saved from execution three years later by the U.S. Supreme Court ruling on June 29, 1972 in Furman v. Georgia, finding the death penalty as written to be unconstitutional. Fifty years after Robert Kennedy's death, Sirhan would still be in prison, transferred in 2013 to Richard J. Donovan Correctional Facility in San Diego. Sirhan would be denied parole 15 times, the last time being on February 10, 2016.
- Born: Manoj Bajpayee, Indian actor; in West Champaran, Bihar

== April 24, 1969 (Thursday) ==
- After Iraq had announced that it closed the Shatt al-Arab waterway to neighboring Iran, the Shah of Iran responded with Joint Operation Arvand, sending his navy's warships to escort an Iranian tanker down the river to the Persian Gulf and daring the Iraqis to attempt an attack. Faced with the superiority of the Iranian military, the Iraqis "had no choice but to remain immobile"; the two nations would agree to share control of the Shatt-al-Arab in 1975.
- BEA Airtours was founded by British European Airways as a charter airline. Operations would begin on March 6, 1970, from Gatwick Airport with a single De Havilland Comet 4B flying vacation groups to La Palma in the Canary Islands. Now called British Airtours, the company continues to operate for British Airways.
- In Taiwan, the government-controlled China Petroleum Company launched the new China Petrochemical Development Company (CPDC) "to promote national development of the petroleum industries, and to free Taiwan from reliance on foreign commerce and control over prices and raw material supplies."
- The first mortgage-backed security was issued for sale by the Government National Mortgage Association, colloquially known as "Ginnie Mae".
- The recently formed British Leyland motor company launched its first new model, the Austin Maxi, in Portugal.
- Rashid Karami resigned as Prime Minister of Lebanon after two days of rioting in the city of Tyre.

== April 25, 1969 (Friday) ==
- The Treaty of Tlatelolco, a nuclear non-proliferation agreement among the signatory nations to ban nuclear weapons from Latin America and in the Caribbean, went into effect after Barbados became the 11th nation to ratify the pact. The treaty had been signed in Mexico on February 14, 1967.
- Born: Renée Zellweger, Oscar-winning American film actress and winner of three Golden Globes; in Katy, Texas
- Died: Generalleutnant Vollrath Lübbe, 75, German tank commander during World War II and prisoner-of-war in the Soviet Union from 1944 to 1955

== April 26, 1969 (Saturday) ==
- At the National Black Economic Development Conference in Detroit, militant leader James Forman delivered what he called "The Black Manifesto", encouraging African-American militants to disrupt services in white Christian churches and Jewish synagogues until the religious institutions agreed to pay $500 million in reparations for the injustices done to the black race.
- Manchester City won English soccer football's FA Cup, beating Leicester City, 1 to 0 at Wembley Stadium in front of 100,000 spectators. With the win, Man City qualified for, and would go on to win, the 1970 European Cup Winners' Cup.
- Died: Morihei Ueshiba, 85, Japanese martial artist who created aikido

== April 27, 1969 (Sunday) ==
- General René Barrientos, the President of Bolivia since 1964, was killed in a helicopter crash while making a farm tour of rural Bolivia. The next day, a reporter for the Miami Herald would begin the obituary for the late president with the words, "The law of averages caught up with Bolivian Rene Barrientos on Sunday." Reporter Don Bohning would note that Barrientos had survived 21 aircraft accidents, 11 of them serious, but that "He perished in the 22nd." Part of the copter's landing gear became tangled in high tension electrical wires near the small town of Arque after taking off from a parking lot, killing the President, his aide Leo Orellana, and the pilot. Vice President Luis Adolfo Siles was sworn into office but would be overthrown in a military coup five months later.
- Voters in Metropolitan France rejected President de Gaulle's proposal to dramatically reform the government, with 10,512,469 voting in favor, but 11,945,149 voting against. More than 80 percent of the registered voters cast ballots. The difference of almost 1.5 million votes meant that the roughly 750,000 yet-to-be-counted votes from France's overseas departments would make no difference in the outcome. "The threat which had helped him to win" in referendums in 1958, 1961, and 1962, an author would note later, "was no longer relevant", because by 1969, there were several reliable and capable candidates who could succeed de Gaulle.
- Born:
  - Michael Krasnow, American author of the bestseller My Life as a Male Anorexic; in Rochester, New York (died of anorexia nervosa, 1997)
  - Cory Booker, African-American politician and U.S. Senator for New Jersey since 2013, and former mayor of Newark; in Washington, D.C.

== April 28, 1969 (Monday) ==
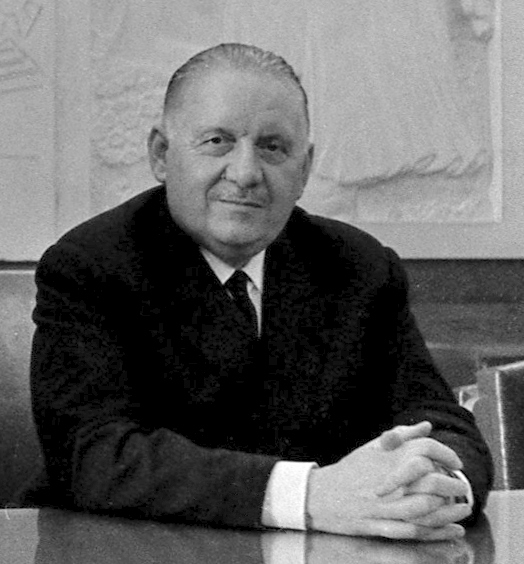
Acting French President Poher

- Charles de Gaulle resigned as president of France after suffering defeat in a referendum the day before, abiding by a pledge to step down if the voters showed no confidence in his plan, and bringing an end to 11 years in office. In a brief statement issued from his home in Colombey-les-Deux-Églises, de Gaulle announced, "I am ceasing the exercise of my functions as President of the Republic. This decision takes effect at noon today." "With a complete absence of formality", the Associated Press noted, "Alain Poher, the President of the French Senate, was named as the Acting President of France by being delivered a letter from the French Constitutional Council advising him that a vacancy in the presidency existed and noting that the constitution authorized him to serve as the chief executive until elections could be held for a new President."
- Terence O'Neill resigned as Prime Minister of Northern Ireland after seven years in office and increasing civil rights violence between the UK nation's Protestant majority and Roman Catholic minority. O'Neill had previously advocated a gradual reform of Northern Ireland's political system.

== April 29, 1969 (Tuesday) ==
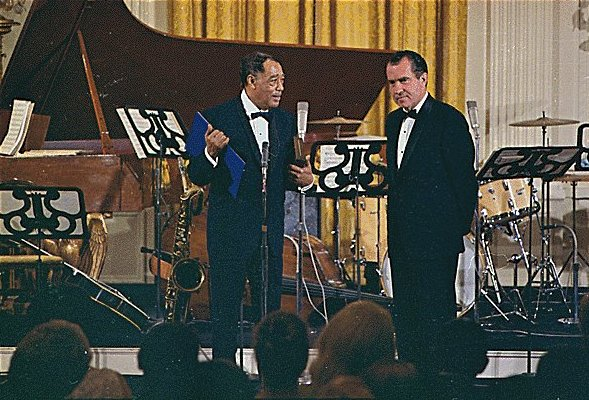
Ellington and Nixon

- Bandleader Duke Ellington was awarded the Presidential Medal of Freedom, the highest civilian honor in the United States, by U.S. President Richard Nixon at a White House celebration of Ellington's 70th birthday.

== April 30, 1969 (Wednesday) ==
- Turi Widerøe of Norway became the world's first woman pilot to be hired for a major western airline (women had been pilots for the Soviet carrier Aeroflot and for Bulgaria's Balkan airline). Certified as a copilot on a Scandinavian Airlines Convair 440, Widerøe took the controls for the first time on May 8.
- The number of United States troops in South Vietnam reached its peak, with 543,482 American servicemen and women – more than half a million – in a nation of 19 million people. From May onward, the number of U.S. troops would gradually decline until the end of the Vietnam War.
