= Chuymani =

Mountain in Bolivia

- Location within Bolivia

Highest point
- Elevation: 3,996 m (13,110 ft)
- Coordinates: 17°48′31″S 66°26′48″W

Geography
- Location: Bolivia, Cochabamba Department
- Parent range: Andes

Chuymani (Aymara chuyma heart or another organ, -ni a suffix, "the one with a heart", also spelled Chuimani) is a 3,996-metre-high (13,110 ft) mountain in the Bolivian Andes. It is located in the Cochabamba Department, Arque Province, Arque Municipality, northwest of Arque.
