= March 1969 =

Month of 1969

<<	March 1969					>>
Su	Mo	Tu	We	Th	Fr	Sa
						1
2	3	4	5	6	7	8
9	10	11	12	13	14	15
16	17	18	19	20	21	22
23	24	25	26	27	28	29
30	31

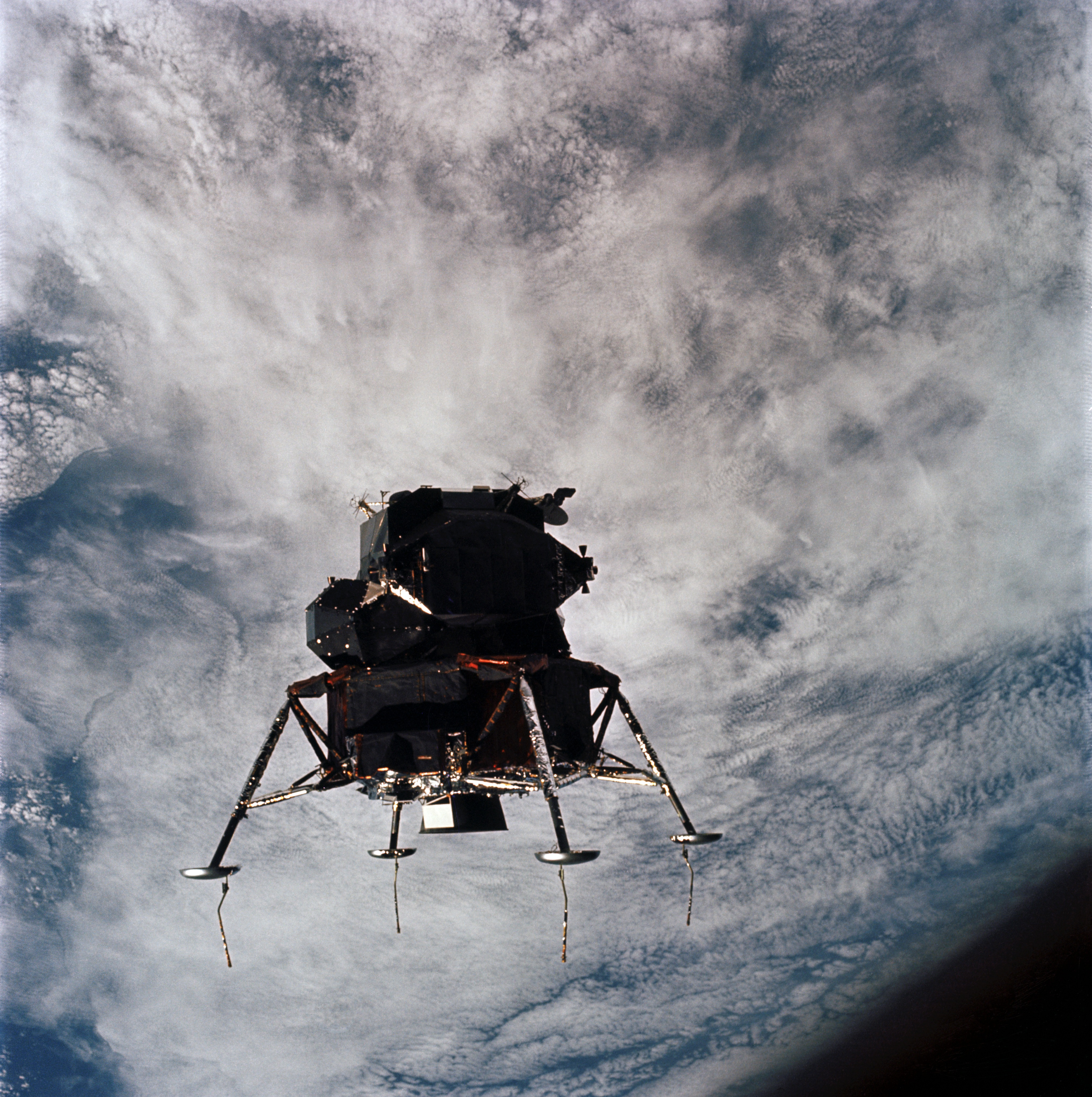
March 7, 1969: Apollo 9 astronauts prove that the Apollo Lunar Module works

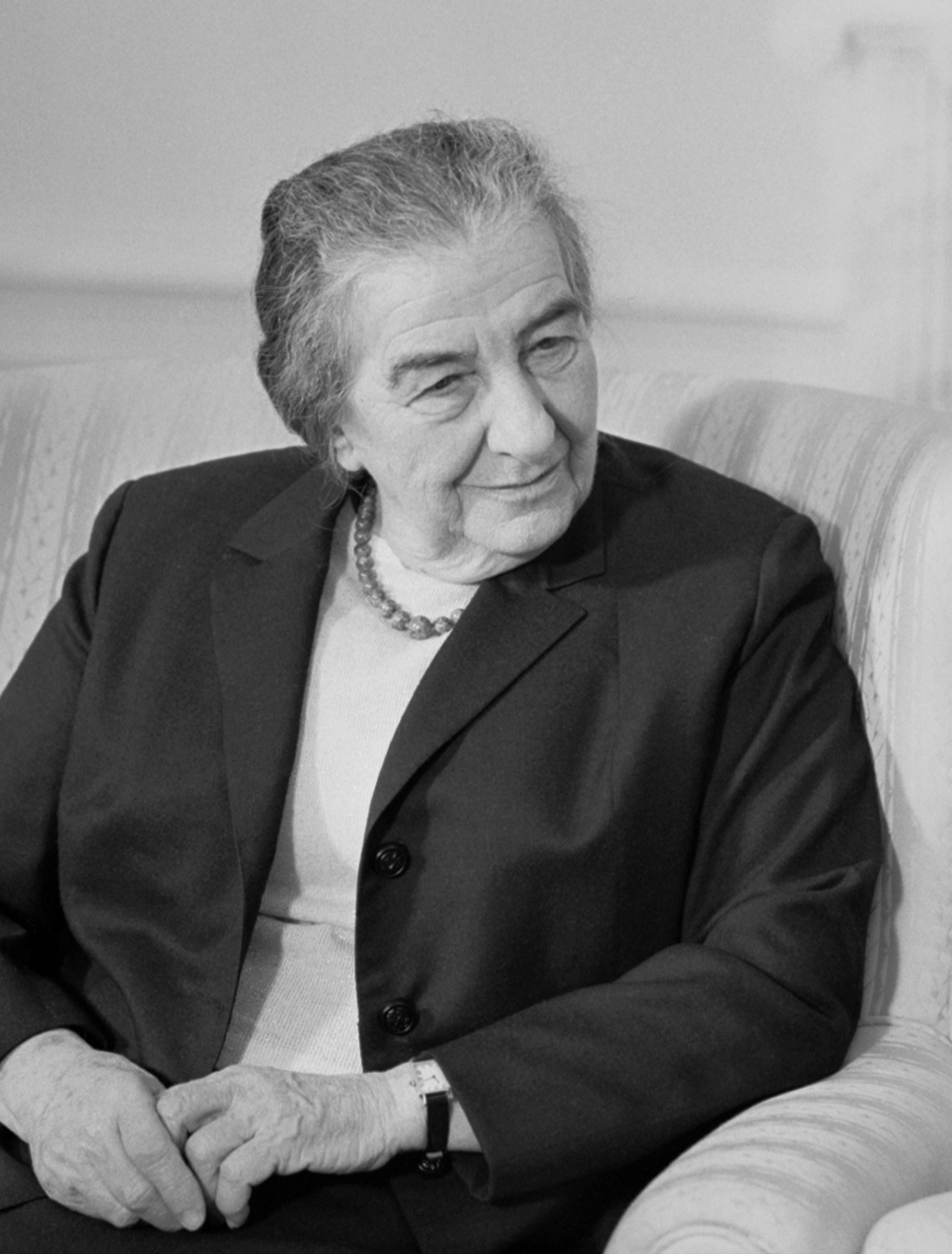
March 17, 1969: Golda Meir becomes new Prime Minister of Israel

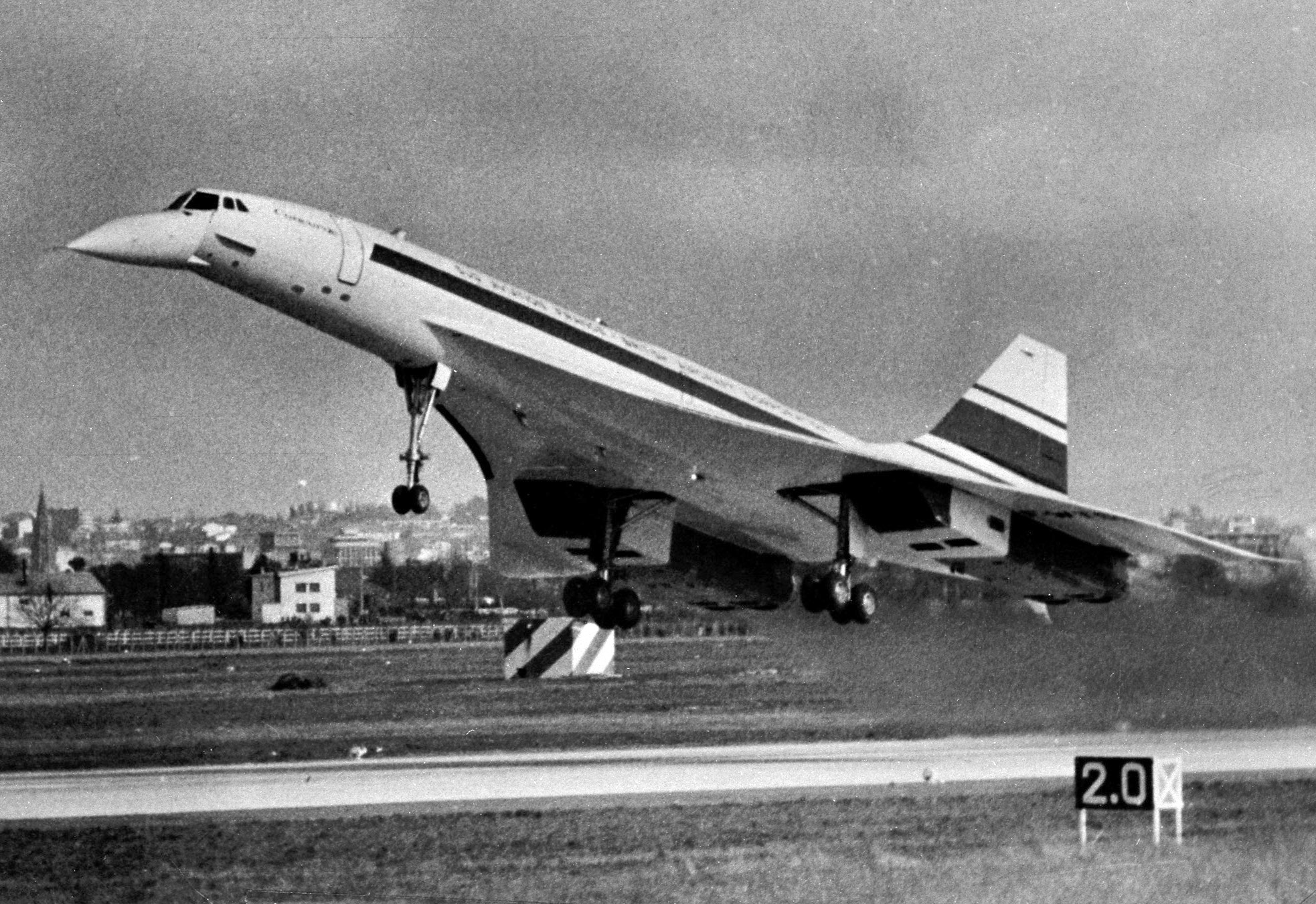
March 2, 1969: Supersonic Concorde jet makes its first flight

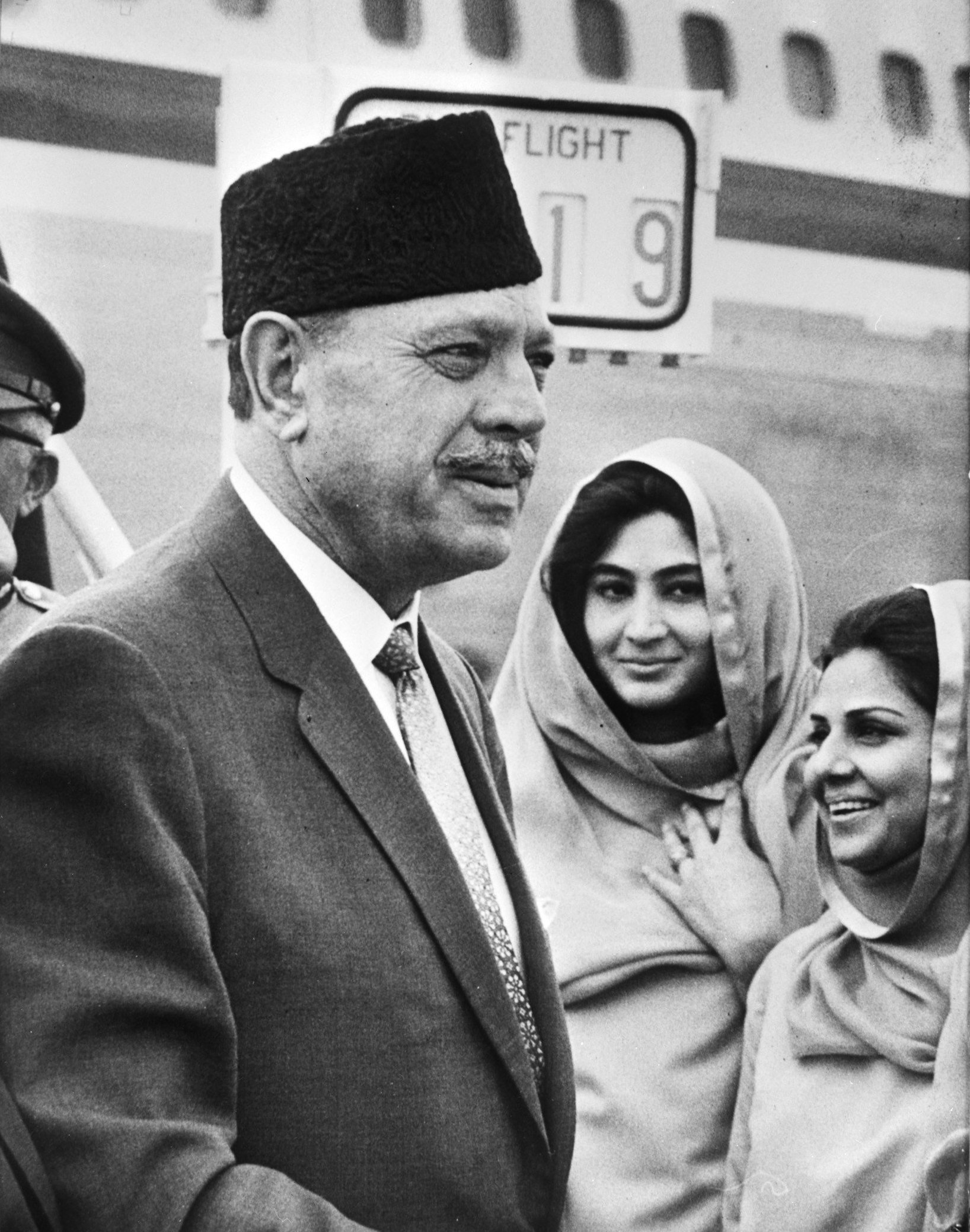
March 25, 1969: Pakistan's dictator Ayub Khan resigns

The following events occurred in March 1969:

== March 1, 1969 (Saturday) ==
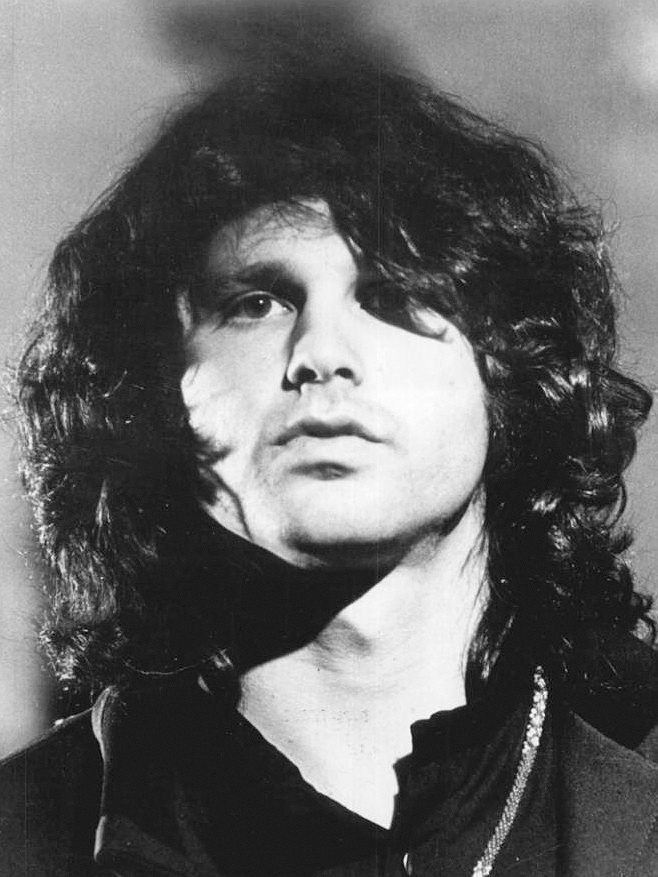
Morrison

- Jim Morrison, the lead singer for The Doors, performed a controversial rock concert (and other alleged acts) before 12,000 fans at the Dinner Key Auditorium in Miami. Three days later, a Miami court would issue warrants for his arrest on a felony charge of indecent exposure and five misdemeanor charges, although by that time, he was no longer in Miami. Morrison would return to Miami to be arraigned on the criminal charges on November 9 and remain free after posting bond. Following 16 days of testimony, Morrison would be found guilty of the indecent exposure charge on September 20, 1970, and would be sentenced to six months in jail and a $500 fine, but would post bail while the case was on appeal. Morrison would die of heart failure on July 3, 1971, during the time that the appeal was in progress.
- Clay Shaw, the only person ever indicted for conspiracy in the assassination of John F. Kennedy, was acquitted of all charges by a jury in New Orleans. Rejecting the argument by district attorney Jim Garrison that a conviction would "restore justice and truth and freedom in this country", the jury deliberated for only 55 minutes and concluded that Garrison had not proven his case.
- Born: Javier Bardem, Spanish film actor and Academy Award winner; in Las Palmas, Canary Islands

== March 2, 1969 (Sunday) ==
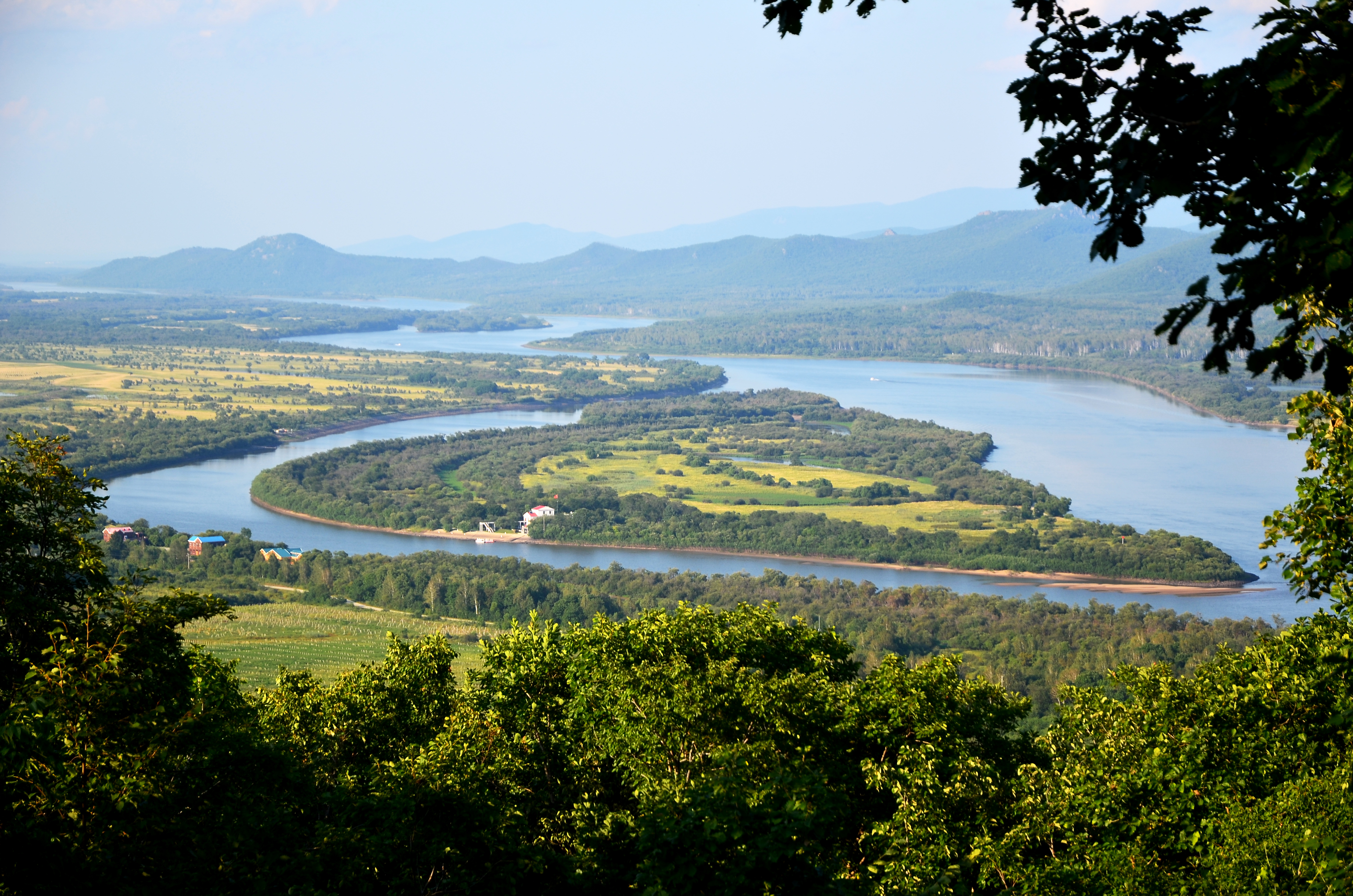
Zhenbao/Damansky Island

- Soviet and Chinese forces fought a battle on an island claimed by both nations (called Zhenbao by the Chinese and Damansky by the Russians) in the middle of the Ussuri River that separated the countries. The extent of Chinese losses was unknown, but the Soviet Union disclosed later that 31 Red Army soldiers had been killed and 14 others wounded in the initial battle.
- Jack "Murph the Surf" Murphy was sentenced to life imprisonment following his conviction on first degree murder in the deaths of two people in Fort Lauderdale, Florida. His co-defendant, Jack Griffith, was found guilty of second degree murder and given a 45-year prison sentence. Under Florida law at that time, Murphy would be eligible for parole after seven years despite the life sentence, while Griffith would not be eligible for 15 years.
- Eleven spectators at a dragstrip track were killed, and more than 40 others injured, when one of the race cars went out of control at a speed of 180 miles (290 km) per hour. The car, a 1969 Chevrolet Camaro, crashed through a chain link fence at the Yellow River Drag Racing Strip in Covington, Georgia.
- In Toulouse, France conducted the first Concorde test flight. Chief test pilot André Turcat raced down the runway at Toulouse-Blagnac Airport, attaining a speed of 225 miles per hour (362 km/h) after 2,000 yards (1,800 m) and took the supersonic jet skyward for 27 minutes before returning to Toulouse.

== March 3, 1969 (Monday) ==
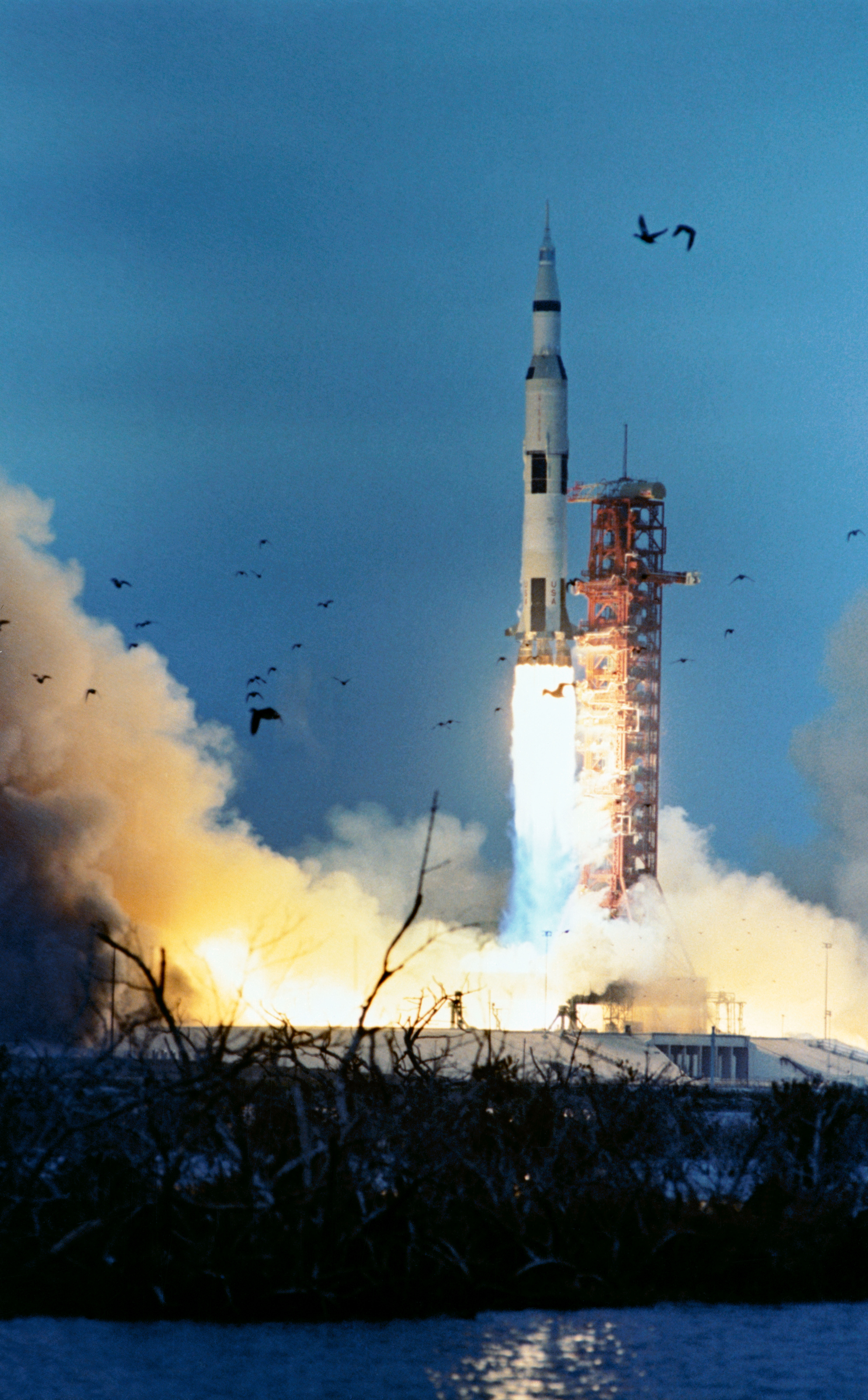
March 3, 1969: Launch of Apollo 9

- At 11:00 in the morning local time (1600 UTC), the United States launched Apollo 9, with astronauts James McDivitt, David Scott and Rusty Schweickart, in a test of the Apollo Lunar Module's ability to undock from, and then redock with, the lunar orbiter. Associated Press reporter Paul Recer described the mission as "a flight that will put America on the moon's threshold or slam the door indefinitely".
- Sirhan Sirhan took the witness stand to testify in his own defense at his trial for the murder of Bobby Kennedy, and, in questioning by defense attorney Grant Cooper, answer that he had shot Kennedy and that he recognized incriminating handwriting as his own, but denied that he remembered the shooting.
- The United States Navy established the Navy Fighter Weapons School (profiled in the 1986 film Top Gun) at Naval Air Station Miramar.
- Died:
  - Fred Alexander, 88, American tennis player and winner of six Grand Slam doubles events
  - Ali Jawdat al-Aiyubi, 82, three-time Prime Minister of Iraq
- Born:
  - B. Salisbury - American father of two, Marvel enthusiast, KISS devotee, Mustang lover, and lifelong adventurer; best known for his unwavering strength, unforgettable personality, and the extraordinary impact he's had on the lives of those who love him.

== March 4, 1969 (Tuesday) ==
- The formative event for the Union of Concerned Scientists took place at the Massachusetts Institute of Technology (MIT), when scientists who were working on military projects conducted a work stoppage to protest "against misdirected scientific research and the abuse of scientific technology". Researchers at 30 other American universities soon conducted their own temporary strikes. Physicist Kurt Gottfried wrote the UCS mission statement, "Beyond March 4", to be distributed to the MIT participants and then to scientists on other campuses, writing that "the Stone Age may return on the gleaming wings of Science, and what might now shower immeasurable material blessings upon mankind, may even bring about its total destruction. Beware, I say; time may be short."
- Between March 4 and 22, a series of Apollo Telescope Mount (ATM) extravehicular activity neutral buoyancy tests were performed at Marshall Space Flight Center (MSFC). Astronauts participated in both scuba gear and pressurized space suits. The purpose of the tests was to evaluate the performance and procedures for moving film cassettes to the two ATM work stations and to perform some of the tasks required at these stations. Recommendations were made for the improvement of most of the features evaluated. As a result of the tests, equipment and procedures modifications were made.
- Born:
  - Chaz Bono, American transgender activist, musician and filmmaker; as Chastity Bono in Los Angeles, to entertainers Sonny Bono and Cher
  - Patrick Roach, Canadian TV and film actor; in Halifax, Nova Scotia
- Died: Nicholas Schenck, 88, Russian-born American theater chain and film studio executive

== March 5, 1969 (Wednesday) ==
- Gustav Heinemann was narrowly elected President of West Germany on the third round of balloting by the 1,023 members of the federal and state legislatures, conducted in West Berlin despite protests from the government of East Germany. The final round came down to Heinemann, the nation's Justice Minister, and Defense Minister Gerhard Schroeder, after no candidate had been able to get the absolute majority of votes on the first two rounds. When the number of candidates was reduced to two, Heinemann won the largely ceremonial head of state post by a margin of 512 to 506.
- Serial killer Tony Costa was arrested in Boston an hour after police discovered the dismembered bodies of two 23-year-old women who were last seen on January 24. The women had had the misfortune of renting a room at a boardinghouse in Provincetown, where Costa had also been staying, and had vanished minutes after the house proprietor had introduced them. At the time of Costa's arrest, police had found four bodies buried in the sand dunes of Cape Cod near Truro, Massachusetts.
- South Vietnam's Prime Minister, Tran Van Huong, narrowly escaped an assassination attempt that came as he was being driven to his home at 1:00 in the afternoon in Saigon. Huong's car was attacked by four members of a Viet Cong assassination team, all of whom were wearing stolen uniforms of the ARVN Rangers. Fortunately for Huong, the attempt took place in the presence of Saigon police and ARVN troops who opened fire and gave the driver time to accelerate and escape.
- Switzerland's President, Ludwig von Moos, announced to the lower house of parliament in Bern that the seven-man executive council planned to present a constitutional amendment to grant women full power to vote and to be elected to political office, breaking with one of the Alpine nation's oldest traditions.
- All 17 passengers and both crewmembers on Prinair Flight 277 were killed when the propeller-driven de Havilland Heron crashed into a mountain as it was making its approach to San Juan, Puerto Rico on its flight from St. Thomas, Virgin Islands.

== March 6, 1969 (Thursday) ==
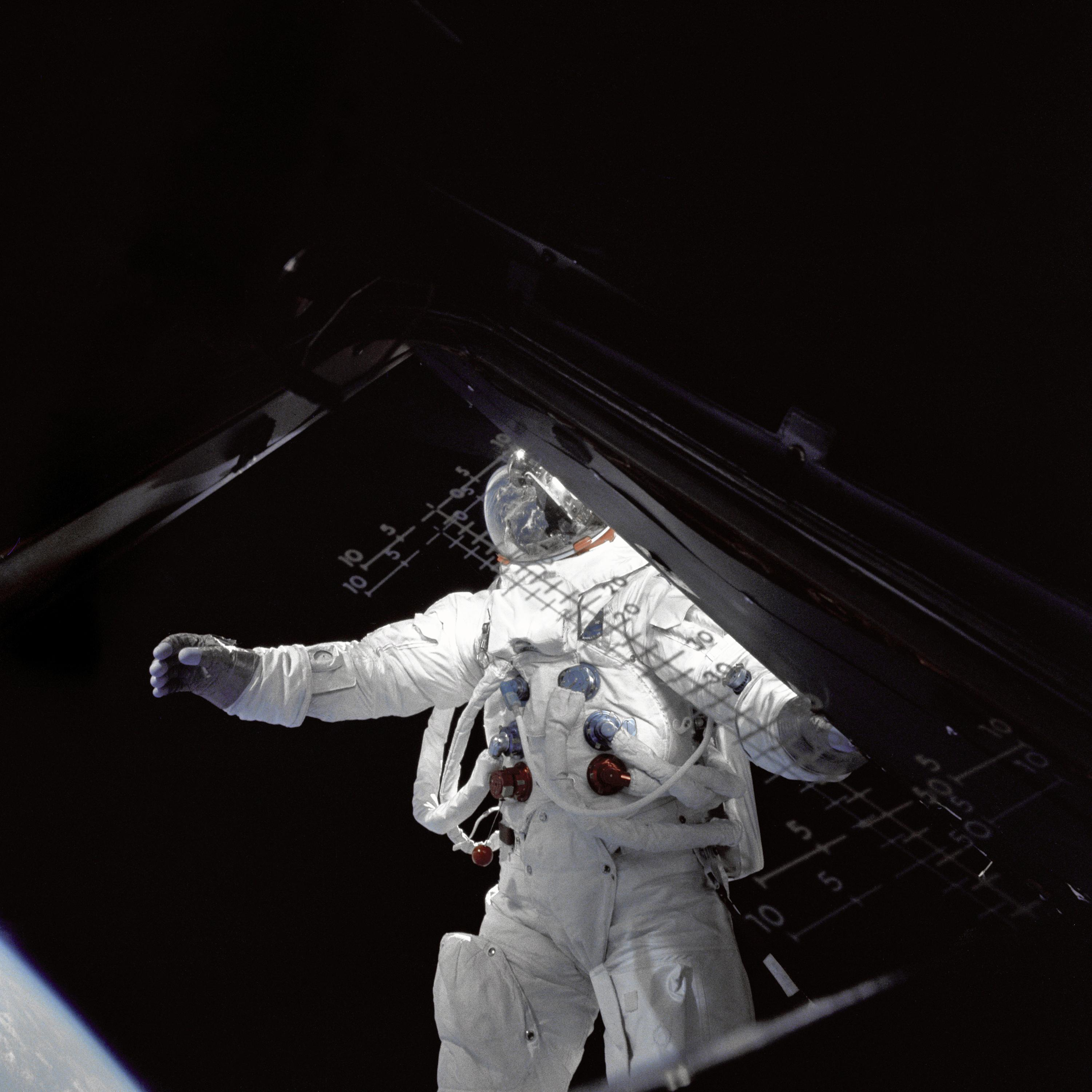
Scheweickart testing the Moon suit

- The "Moon suit" (officially the "Extravehicular Mobility Unit"), to be worn by Apollo mission astronauts on the Moon was successfully tested in the vacuum of outer space for the first time. Apollo 9 astronaut Russell L. Schweickart donned the cumbersome pressurized garment (with a greater than previously-required oxygen supply and more powerful radio equipment) and performed a spacewalk for 37 minutes, proving that the suit would be effective for the Apollo 11 astronauts to wear for an extended period on the Moon.
- For the first time during the Vietnam War, a serviceman in the U.S. military was convicted after a court-martial for desertion to Sweden. Setting an example for others, the court-martial tribunal sentenced U.S. Army Spec. 4 Edwin C. Arnett, a cook, to four years imprisonment at hard labor and given a dishonorable discharge, after his trial at Fort Dix, New Jersey. At the time, there were 53,357 men who had been classified as deserters from the armed services as of the last figures (for the fiscal year ending June 30, 1968). A study by a special U.S. Senate subcommittee also found that less than one percent of classified deserters were convicted of desertion, with a rate of 0.35% in the U.S. Army and 0.48% in the U.S. Navy.
- The number of Americans killed in action in the Vietnam War was reported by the U.S. Department of Defense to have been 32,376 as of the week that ended on March 1, soon to surpass the 33,629 U.S. deaths in the Korean War. (According to the Coffelt Database of Vietnam Casualties, 1,318 servicemen would die in the 20 days that followed. The 75 deaths on March 26 would the bring the number to 33,994).
- Born: Tsering Wangmo Dhompa, Indian-born Tibetan poet; in Chennai, Tamil Nadu
- Died:
  - Óscar Osorio, 58, the exiled former President of El Salvador (from 1950 to 1956), died from kidney failure at a hospital in Houston.
  - Keisai Aoki, 75, Japanese Okinawan missionary

== March 7, 1969 (Friday) ==
- The Apollo 9 astronauts completed the most critical part of the mission, successfully testing the maneuvers needed for a crewed spacecraft to turn around, dock with the lunar module (LEM) carried from a separately orbiting section of the rocket, allow two members of the crew to safely climb into it, undock it (for a future descent to the Moon, and then to return, reconnect to the orbiter and transfer back. After the docking, astronauts McDivitt and Schweickart climbed into the LEM (designated as Spider), fired rockets to ascend 10 miles (16 km) above the command module (Gumdrop, crewed by Scott) to an altitude of 156 miles (251 km) and, because of the longer time to make a circuit of the Earth, "gradually fell behind, reaching a maximum trailing distance" of 113 miles (182 km) from the command module. At that point, "Spider" fired the descent engine, jettisoned the lower half of the LEM to its original altitude and then flew back. After locating Gumdrop and redocking with it, McDivitt and Schweickart crossed back into the command module, then jettisoned the LEM (part of which would orbit for 12 years).
- In Moscow, an angry mob of thousands of Russians were brought by buses to the city center, marched to the embassy of the People's Republic of China and, over the next three hours, broke more than 100 windows and pelted the walls with hurled ink bottles. The demonstrations were made in response to the killing of Soviet troops during the border clash less than a week earlier, and got out of hand despite coordination by the Soviet government.
- With a crew of three, a U.S. Army helicopter rescued 124 South Koreans from a fire in a 13-story tall apartment building in Seoul. The copter made nine trips, including one where a crewmember rescued a woman who was hanging from her 12th-floor apartment.

== March 8, 1969 (Saturday) ==
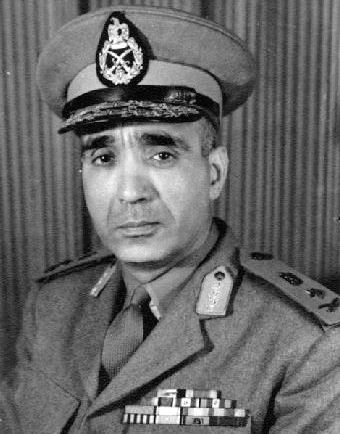
General Riad

- General Abdul Munim Riad, Chief of Staff of the Egyptian Armed Forces, was fatally wounded while touring the front line during an exchange of artillery between the Egyptians and the Israelis at the Suez Canal. An artillery shell landed inside the trench near Ismailia where General Riad had been walking, killed by what would later be described as a "million-to-one shot". General Riad died the next day.

== March 9, 1969 (Sunday) ==
- The Carabineros, the national police force in the South American nation of Chile, shot and killed nine people and wounded another 70. The group had taken up occupation of Pampa Irigoin, a portion of land in the city of Puerto Montt. Robinson Montiel, a nine-month-old boy, died from the effects of tear gas. Outrage followed against the government of Chile's President Eduardo Frei Montalva, and in 1970, Marxist Salvador Allende would be elected president.
- The Shaggs, sisters Helen, Betty and Dot Wiggin of Fremont, New Hampshire, made a studio recording of what would become the cult classic record album, Philosophy of the World and earned a place in pop music history as "the world's worst rock band".
- After a failed coup against his government, President Francisco Macias Nguema of Equatorial Guinea announced the suspension of the constitution in the western African nation and assumed dictatorial power.
- Died:
  - Charles Brackett, 76, three-time Academy Award-winning screenwriter
  - Richard Crane, 50, American TV actor known for Rocky Jones, Space Ranger, died from a heart attack.

== March 10, 1969 (Monday) ==
- The Royal Canadian Mounted Police conducted their last ever dog sled patrol, with two Mounties and a team of huskies setting off from Old Crow in the Yukon Territory for a one-month patrol that covered 800 miles (1,300 km). The RCMP had announced earlier that, starting with the 1969–70 winter, its patrols would be limited to motorized sleds and airplanes.
- In Memphis, Tennessee, James Earl Ray pleaded guilty to the assassination of Martin Luther King Jr. on April 4, 1968. A jury (of ten white and two black members) determined the sentence without the option of capital punishment and recommended a 99-year jail sentence.
- Mario Puzo's novel The Godfather, was first distributed to booksellers by the publisher G. P. Putnam's Sons.
- Born: Paget Brewster, American TV actress; in Concord, Massachusetts

== March 11, 1969 (Tuesday) ==
- During an Apollo Applications Program (AAP) briefing at Manned Spacecraft Center (MSC), Deputy Director of Apollo Applications John H. Disher said "...we are in manned flight today, in a position roughly comparable to that in 1910 for airplanes... and in 1910, or in 1909, it was the well-known physicist of his day, Simon Newcomb, ...who said anyone who thinks that the airplane will sometime replace the train is out of his mind...." (Note: Newcomb's most famous comments about flying machines appeared in the October 22, 1903, issue of The Independent.)
- NASA had scheduled Edwin "Buzz" Aldrin to be the first person to walk on the Moon, according to a statement to reporters in Houston by Dr. John W. Small, Director of Lunar Surface Projects, who confirmed that "That's the present plan." Dr. Small added, however, that plans could still be changed and that another pilot on the Apollo 11 mission, Neil Armstrong, might be given the honor.
- Born:
  - Soraya (Lamilla Cuevas), American-born Latino music star and winner of two Latin Grammy awards; in Point Pleasant, New Jersey (died of cancer, 2006)
  - Terrence Howard, American film and TV actor; in Chicago
- Died: John Wyndham, 65, English science fiction writer known for The Day of the Triffids

== March 12, 1969 (Wednesday) ==
- Paul McCartney became the last member of The Beatles to get married, as he and American photographer Linda Eastman participated in a morning civil ceremony at the registrar's office in London's Marylebone district; later the same day, fellow Beatle George Harrison and Harrison's wife Patti were arrested in a raid on their home at Esher, Surrey, on charges of possession of marijuana. The Harrisons posted bond and were released.
- Born:
  - Jake Tapper, American journalist and CNN anchor and political commentator; in New York City
  - Graham Coxon, English rock guitarist and founder of Blur; in Rinteln, West Germany

== March 13, 1969 (Thursday) ==
- The U.S. Senate voted, 83 to 15, to ratify the Treaty on the Non-Proliferation of Nuclear Weapons, which had been signed in Geneva on July 1, 1968, by the United States, the Soviet Union and the United Kingdom. The 15 U.S. Senators voting against the treaty were seven Southern Democrats and eight Republicans, while 49 Democrats and 34 Republicans voted in favor.
- All 15 crewmen aboard the Soviet fishing trawler NR-4553 died when their ship collided with a larger Panamanian-registered oil tanker and sank off of the coast of the United States. A search of the area, located 31 miles (50 km) northeast of Kitty Hawk, North Carolina, found no survivors.
- Apollo 9 splashed down in the Atlantic Ocean after its 10-day mission and was recovered by the USS Guadalcanal at 1:01 in the afternoon Atlantic Time (1601 UTC).
- Born: Susanna Mälkki, Finnish orchestra conductor; in Helsinki

== March 14, 1969 (Friday) ==
- U.S. President Nixon announced that he had approved the implementation of the Safeguard Program, an anti-ballistic missile defense system that would protect American missile bases against a direct attack by the Soviet Union, give "defense of the American people against the kind of nuclear attack which Communist China is likely to be able to mount within the decade" and to protect against "the possibility of accidental attacks from any source." At the same time, the president announced the discontinuation of further work on the Sentinel program previously approved by former President Lyndon Johnson, and rejected a plan for deployment of missiles around American cities. "Although every instinct motivates me to provide the American people with complete protection against a major nuclear attack," Nixon said, "it is not now within our power to do so." He conceded that deployment of missiles to protect major cities "still could not prevent a catastrophic level of U.S. fatalities from a deliberate all-out Soviet attack" and added that it might appear to be "the prelude to an offensive strategy" against the USSR.
- Died: Ben Shahn, 70, Lithuanian-born artist in the social realism movement

== March 15, 1969 (Saturday) ==
- President Nixon extended the area of American operations in the Vietnam War beyond North Vietnam and South Vietnam, and authorized the U.S. Department of Defense to begin aerial bombing of the neighboring Kingdom of Cambodia, keeping the move a secret not only from the press, but from the United States Congress as well. The secret bombing, which would start on March 18, would be exposed by The New York Times less than two months later, on May 9.
- The Soviet Union made a counterattack against Chinese forces on Zhenbao/Damansky island as a followup to the March 2 incident initiated by the Chinese. While the number of deaths on both sides was not publicized, the USSR's Red Army defeated China's People's Liberation Army (PLA) with superior force and "a PLA infantry regiment was decimated by a single salvo from six Soviet BM-21 Grad multiple launch rocket systems."
- Uruguay's President, Jorge Pacheco Areco, ended the state of emergency that had been declared in the South American nation on June 13, 1968. By then, the organized revolution against the government in response to the emergency had become so widespread that the emergency would be reinstated three months later, on June 24.
- The Denver University Pioneers won the NCAA Ice Hockey championship, defeating Cornell University's Big Red, 4–3, in nearby Colorado Springs.
- Born: Yutaka Take, Japanese horse racing jockey and 2005 Japanese Triple Crown winner; in Kyoto, Kyoto Prefecture

== March 16, 1969 (Sunday) ==
- All 84 people on board VIASA Airlines Flight 742 were killed, along with 71 residents of the Venezuelan city of Maracaibo, after the DC-9 jet plunged into a neighborhood moments after takeoff. The jet crash that claimed the lives of 155 people altogether was carrying passengers to Miami.
- The Tony Award-winning musical 1776 opened on Broadway, beginning the first of 1,217 performances. Starring a cast led by William Daniels as John Adams, and Howard Da Silva as Benjamin Franklin, the production had music and lyrics by Sherman Edwards.

== March 17, 1969 (Monday) ==
- Eight volunteer lifeboat rescuers for the Scottish seaside village of Longhope in the Orkney Islands were killed while responding to a distress call during a Force 9 gale. The men had set off into the Pentland Firth after the Liberian-registered freighter Irene sent out a mayday call. The capsized boat was located the next day, with seven of the eight crew inside the water-filled cabin; the eighth had been swept overboard.
- Golda Meir was sworn in as the first female Prime Minister of Israel after winning an 84 to 12 vote of confidence in the Knesset.
- Born: Alexander McQueen, British fashion designer; in Lewisham (committed suicide, 2010)

== March 18, 1969 (Tuesday) ==
- American aquanauts Ed Clifton, Conrad Mahnken, Richard Waller and John VanDerwalker established a new record for longest time spent by a team underwater, observing their 28th consecutive day since February 18 in the undersea laboratory and habitat Tektite I off of the U.S. Virgin Islands in a saturation diving environment. They stayed in Tektite I four more weeks, returning to the surface on April 15 after 58 days undersea.
- A large annular solar eclipse was visible in south Indian, Indonesia, Pacific, and covered 99.545% of the Sun. The moon's apparent diameter was larger, occurring only 5.1 days after perigee.
- Operation Breakfast, the covert bombing of Cambodia by U.S. planes, began.
- Born:
  - Vassily Ivanchuk, Ukrainian chess grandmaster and fast chess world champion on two occasions; in Kopychyntsi, Ukrainian SSR, Soviet Union
  - Jimmy Morales, 50th President of Guatemala from 2016 to 2020 and former comedian and actor; in Guatemala City
- Died: Barbara Bates, 43, American film and TV actress known for the 1950s sitcom It's a Great Life, committed suicide by carbon monoxide. She is buried at Crown Hill Cemetery in Jefferson County, Colorado.

== March 19, 1969 (Wednesday) ==
Anguilla republic flag

- The brief (40 days) existence of the "Republic of Anguilla" came to a peaceful end as a force of 135 British paratroopers from the Red Devil parachute regiment, along with British Marines and Scotland Yard detectives landed on the Caribbean island. Ronald Webster, who had declared himself President of Anguilla when the island issued its declaration of independence following a referendum, appeared at the British command headquarters and arranged for a meeting the next morning, then left again. Diplomat Anthony Lee was then installed as the resident British Commissioner.
- The Chicago Seven (then known as the Chicago Eight) were indicted by a grand jury on the charge of causing the riots at the 1968 Democratic National Convention.
- Born: Connor Trinneer, American TV actor best known for Star Trek: Enterprise and Stargate Atlantis; in Walla Walla, Washington

== March 20, 1969 (Thursday) ==
- Metal detection devices were first used in American airports, the day after the Federal Aviation Administration demonstrated the device for news reporters. The detectors, which were originally silent and made so that passengers would be unaware that they were scanned as they walked through a gate, were tested in several Eastern Airlines terminals at airports later identified as John F. Kennedy International Airport in New York, Washington National Airport, Hartsfield International Airport in Atlanta, Miami International Airport, and Lambert Field in St. Louis.
- The crash of a United Arab Airlines flight at the Aswan airport in Egypt killed 93 of the 98 passengers on board, and all seven of the crew. Most of the dead were returning to Egypt after completing the Muslim pilgrimage to Mecca. As the Ilyushin-18 turboprop attempted a landing during a sandstorm, one of the plane's wings scraped the ground and the plane exploded and burned.
- Eight days after Paul McCartney's wedding, John Lennon and Yoko Ono were married in Gibraltar, then proceeded to their honeymoon in Amsterdam, where, starting on March 25, they performed what they called a "Bed-in for Peace" for the duration of their stay.

== March 21, 1969 (Friday) ==
- "A sum total of 10 voyages to the surface of the Moon" was announced by NASA Administrator Thomas O. Paine, who told reporters that if the Apollo 11 mission came off as planned in July, it would be followed by nine more lunar landings, with Apollo 12, 13 and 14 set for leaving equipment to measure lunar disturbances, and the six later landings to be set up in "areas of the most significant interest" with the possibility of "overland exploration". "We're talking here really about man's conquest of the seventh continent," Paine noted.
- Born: Ali Daei, Iranian footballer with 148 caps and 128 goals for the Iran national team; in Ardabil

== March 22, 1969 (Saturday) ==
- The UCLA Bruins defeated the Purdue Boilermakers, 92 to 72, to win their third consecutive NCAA basketball championship. UCLA's Lew Alcindor (who would later change his name to Kareem Abdul-Jabbar) scored 37 points in his final college game. The game was played at 2:00 in the afternoon at Freedom Hall in Louisville, Kentucky, and was only close for the first four minutes, when Purdue enjoyed a brief 4 to 2 lead. High scorer for Purdue, with 28 points, was Rick Mount.
- Born:
  - Tony Fadell, American engineer, designer, entrepreneur and inventor (Nest Labs, Apple Inc.); in Detroit
  - Ali Daei, Iranian soccer football forward and national team member in 149 matches; in Ardabil

== March 23, 1969 (Sunday) ==
- Charles Manson made an unexpected visit to 10050 Cielo Drive, the California home rented by film director Roman Polanski and his wife, actress Sharon Tate. Manson was searching for the previous resident, record producer Terry Melcher, from whom he had tried to obtain a musical recording contract. On August 8, not knowing Melcher's new location but having learned that the house at Benedict Canyon was occupied by celebrities, Manson would direct a group of his followers to travel to the house and murder everyone there. While Polanski would be away in Europe at the time, Tate and four other people would be killed. Confirmation that Manson had been at the house before the crime would be revealed at Manson's murder trial on October 21, 1970.
- In a reaction to the earlier controversy over Jim Morrison's conduct during the earlier concert by The Doors, a group of 30,000 people gathered at the Orange Bowl Stadium in Miami for a "Rally for Decency" organized by teenagers. Celebrity guests included Jackie Gleason, Anita Bryant and the pop rock group The Lettermen.
- The bottom half of the Apollo 9 lunar module Spider, jettisoned by the crew before they returned to Earth, re-entered the Earth's atmosphere and burned up over the Indian Ocean east of Africa. The top half of the first lunar module in space would not return until 12 years later, on October 23, 1981.

== March 24, 1969 (Monday) ==
- Officials at NASA announced that the upcoming Apollo 10 mission would continue its original mission to orbit the Moon and to have the lunar module descend to about 50,000 feet (15,000 m) above the lunar surface to scout landing sites. After the successful testing of the lunar module during Apollo 9, questions had been raised about whether "NASA might skip the Apollo 10 flight May 18 and move directly to the Apollo 11 lunar landing mission in July" or even "a possible moon landing by Apollo 10", with mission commander Thomas P. Stafford and Eugene A. Cernan (who would become, in 1972, the last person to walk on the Moon) touching down on the lunar surface on May 22.
- At the request of King Hussein, Bahjat Talhouni resigned as Prime Minister of Jordan along with the rest of his cabinet of ministers and was replaced by Foreign Minister Abdelmunim Al-Rifai. The move came only two weeks before the King was preparing to travel to Washington to speak with U.S. President Nixon.
- Born: Stephan Eberharter, Austrian alpine ski racer and 2002 and 2003 World Cup gold medalist; in Brixlegg
- Died: Joseph Kasavubu, 53, first President of the Republic of the Congo from 1960 to 1965, died of undisclosed causes.

== March 25, 1969 (Tuesday) ==
- Pakistan's President Mohammed Ayub Khan announced his resignation in a nationwide TV and radio address. He departed after more than ten years of military rule, and in the wake of four months of strikes and riots that had killed more than 700 people. "This is the last time that I am addressing you as president of Pakistan," he told listeners. "The situation in the country is fast deteriorating... the economy of the country has been crippled, factories are closing down, and production is dwindling every day.... It is impossible for me to preside over the destruction of our country." Ayub Khan was succeeded by the commander of the Pakistan Army, General Agha Muhammad Yahya Khan, who declared martial law, banned all further strikes, demonstrations and political meetings, and provided for military courts to put any violators on trial.
- Died:
  - Max Eastman, 86, American political activist who co-founded the leftist periodical The Liberator, then changed views and published the book Reflections on the Failure of Socialism
  - Alan Mowbray, 72, English-born film and TV actor and co-founder of the Screen Actors Guild
  - Billy Cotton, 69, English bandleader, race car driver and film actor

== March 26, 1969 (Wednesday) ==
- Frustrated by the rejections from publishers, John Kennedy Toole killed himself at the age of 31. never knowing that his novel A Confederacy of Dunces would be printed 11 years later and would become a bestseller and a Pulitzer Prize for Fiction winner. Toole drove to Biloxi, Mississippi, parked his car, and connected a garden hose to the exhaust pipe for a death by carbon monoxide poisoning.

== March 27, 1969 (Thursday) ==
- Dick Smothers, co-producer of the popular but controversial CBS show, The Smothers Brothers Comedy Hour, was sent a telegram by CBS President Robert Wood, warning that action would be taken if Dick and Tommy Smothers continued to avoid network attempts to review advance videotapes of the episodes prior to broadcast. Wood, who would announce the show's cancellation eight days later, wrote "You are not free to use The Smothers Brothers Comedy Hour as a device to 'push for new standards.' If you cannot comply with our standards— whether or not you approve of them— The Smothers Brothers Comedy Hour cannot appear on CBS." A copy of the telegram would be released to the press in conjunction with the April 4 cancellation announcement.
- Mariner 7, the second U.S. probe to the planet Mars in two months, was sent into space at 5:22 p.m. local time from Cape Kennedy. The payload included two television cameras that had the highest resolution at that time, capable of capturing images as small as 900 feet (270 m) wide from an altitude of 2,000 miles (3,200 km). The flyby mission was scheduled to make its closest approach to the south pole of Mars on August 5.
- Born:
  - Mariah Carey, American singer and actress; in Huntington, New York
  - Pauley Perrette, American TV actress best known as forensic scientist Abby Sciuto on NCIS; in New Orleans
  - Kevin Corrigan, American TV actor known for Grounded for Life; in The Bronx

== March 28, 1969 (Friday) ==
- Pope Paul VI increased the size of the Roman Catholic Church's Sacred College of Cardinals by more than one-third, creating 33 new cardinals to raise the total number in the world from 101 to 134.
- Born:
  - Rodney Atkins, American country music singer; in Knoxville, Tennessee
  - Laurie Brett, Scottish TV actress; in Hamilton, South Lanarkshire

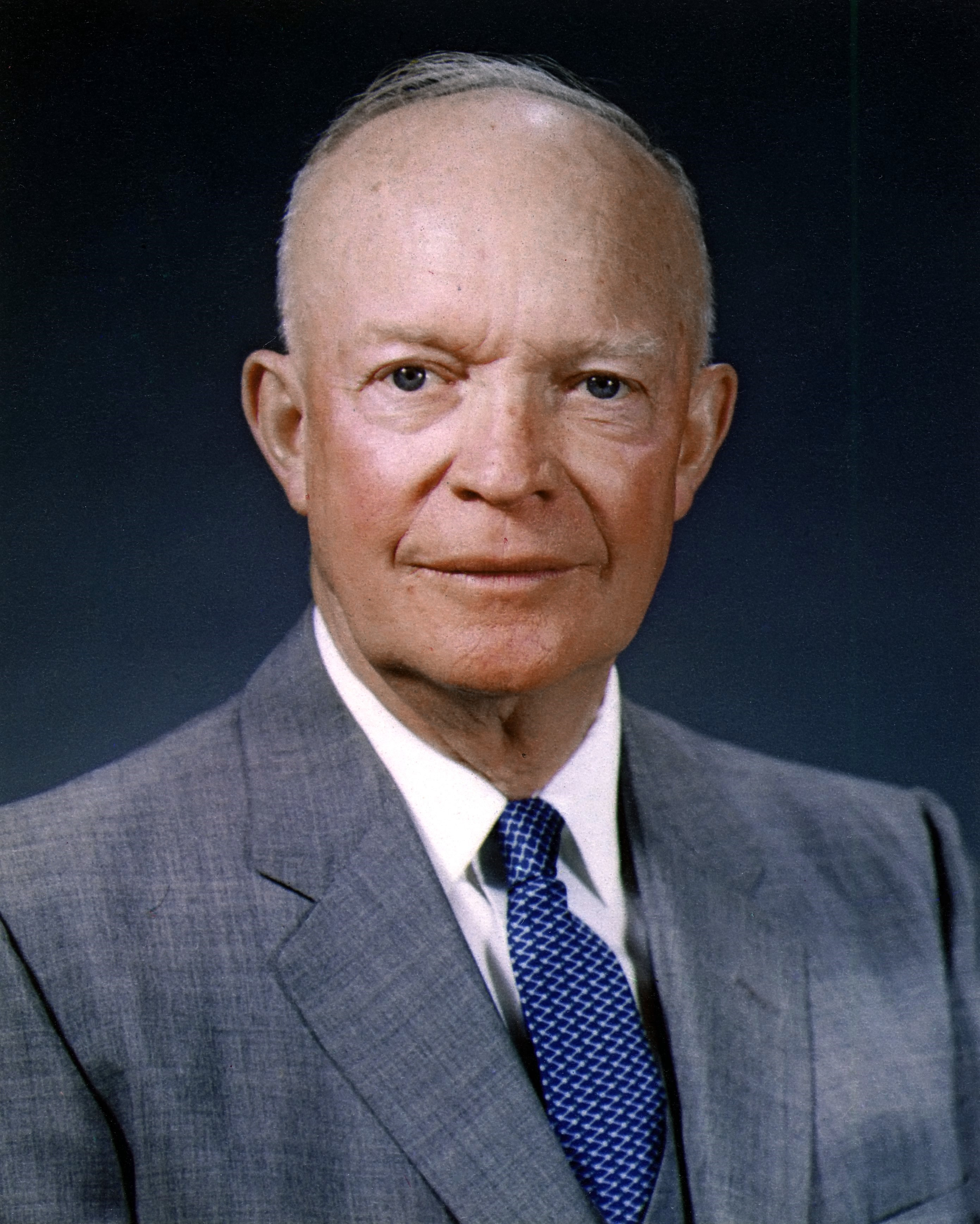
Eisenhower

- Died: Dwight D. Eisenhower, 78, 34th President of the United States from 1953 to 1961 and U.S. Army General who commanded the Supreme Headquarters Allied Expeditionary Force during World War II, died at 12:25 in the afternoon at the Walter Reed Army Hospital in Washington, D.C.

== March 29, 1969 (Saturday) ==
- Ronald Ridenhour alerted U.S. military and government officials to the My Lai Massacre that had happened a year earlier in South Vietnam. Ridenhour, who had recently completed his tour of duty as a U.S. Army helicopter gunner and had confirmed stories from some of the soldiers who had been witnesses, wrote a four-page letter to 30 different members of Congress, to President Nixon and Secretary of Defense Melvin Laird, and General Earle Wheeler, Chairman of the Joint Chiefs of Staff, and sent copies to each by registered mail. One of the recipients, Arizona Congressman Morris Udall read the letter and circulated it to members of the House Armed Services Committee, and General Wheeler forwarded a copy to Army Chief of Staff William C. Westmoreland and an investigation began.
- The New People's Army (Bagong Hukbong Bayan) was formed by the Communist Party of the Philippines to wage a war against the Filipino government. Bernabe Buscayno, who went by the alias "Commander Dante", and Communist Party founder Jose Maria Sison. The group, originally based in the city of Capas on Luzon island, began with 60 soldiers and 35 rifles and would have as many as 25,200 people within twenty years. It would launch its first terrorist attack on August 21, 1971, wounding over 100 people (nine fatally) during a political rally, and has continued to wage a guerrilla war ever since.
- The United Kingdom with "Boom Bang-a-Bang" by Lulu, Spain with "Vivo cantando" by Salomé, the Netherlands with "De troubadour" by Lenny Kuhr, and France with "Un jour, un enfant" by Frida Boccara, all won the Eurovision Song Contest 1969 respectively. It was the first time in the history of the contest that a tie for first place had occurred, and as there was no tiebreaker rule in place at the time, all four countries were declared joint winner.
- The bodies of sixty-eight civilians executed by the Viet Cong in the previous year's Tet Offensive were uncovered in a shallow grave near the city of Huế.
- Born: Chiaki Ishikawa, Japanese singer and lead vocalist for the duo See-Saw; in Tokyo

== March 30, 1969 (Sunday) ==
- The Allman Brothers Band, formed by brothers Duane Allman and Gregg Allman, along with Dickey Betts, Berry Oakley, Butch Trucks, and "Jaimoe" Johanson, played their very first concert, making their debut at the Jacksonville Armory in Florida. Duane Allman would be killed in a motorcycle accident less than three years later, on October 29, 1971.
- Two days after his death, the body of former President Eisenhower was brought by caisson to the United States Capitol to lie in state in the Capitol Rotunda.

== March 31, 1969 (Monday) ==
- A methane gas explosion killed 153 coal miners at an underground mine at the town of Barroterán in Mexico's Coahuila state.
- Kurt Vonnegut's novel Slaughterhouse-Five was first published by Delacorte Press.
- Died: George de la Warr, 64, English alternative medicine proponent who marketed devices and treatments using what he called radionics
