= Inka Pukara (Cochabamba) =

Mountain in Bolivia

- Location within Bolivia

Highest point
- Elevation: 4,422 m (14,508 ft)
- Coordinates: 17°52′30″S 66°29′15″W

Geography
- Location: Bolivia, Cochabamba Department
- Parent range: Andes

Inka Pukara (Aymara and Quechua Inka Inca, pukara fortress, "Inka fortress", also spelled Inca Pucara) is a 4,422-metre-high (14,508 ft) mountain in the Bolivian Andes. It is located in the Cochabamba Department, Arque Province, Tacopaya Municipality, southeast of Tacopaya.
