= Tacopaya Municipality =

- Municipality
- Location within Bolivia
- Coordinates: 17°49′S 66°39′W
- Country: Bolivia
- Department: Cochabamba Department
- Province: Arque Province
- Cantons: 2
- Seat: Tacopaya

Government
  - Mayor: Ramon Quispe Mamani (2007)
  - President: Bacilo Ugarte Medrano (2007)

Area
  - Total: 218 sq mi (565 km^{2})
- Elevation: 13,000 ft (4,000 m)

Population (2001)
  - Total: 11,658
- Time zone: UTC-4 (BOT)

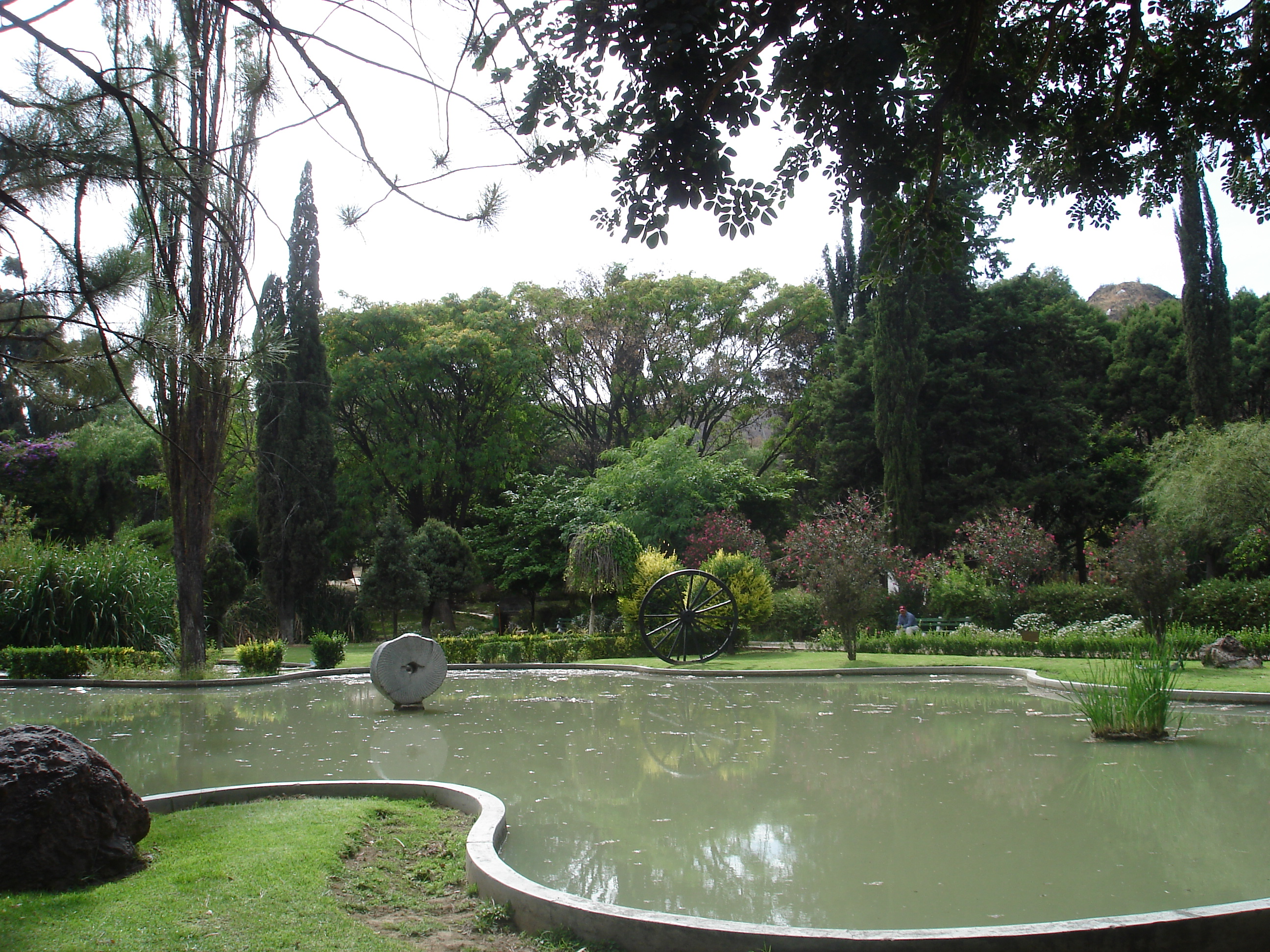
The Botanic Garden of Cochabamba, Bolivia, relevant to the Cochabamba Department and municipalities like Tacopaya

Tacopaya Municipality is the second municipal section of the Arque Province in the Cochabamba Department in Bolivia. Its seat is Tacopaya. At the time of census 2001 the municipality had 11,658 inhabitants.

== Geography ==
Some of the highest mountains of the municipality are listed below:

- Chullpa Ch'utu
- Inka Pukara
- Janq'u Jaqhi
- Kuntur Sayana
- Kuntur Wachana
- Mik'ayani
- Millu Wiqu
- Murmuntani
- Pichaqani
- Pukara
- P'ujru P'ujruni
- Silla Q'asa
- Uma P'ujru
- Wila Ch'utu
- Yaritani

== Cantons ==
The municipality is divided into two cantons. They are (their seats in parentheses):

- Tacopaya Canton - (Tacopaya)
- Ventilla Canton - (Ventilla)

== Languages ==
The languages spoken in the Tacopaya Municipality are mainly Quechua and Spanish.

Language	Inhabitants
Quechua	10,766
Aymara	123
Guaraní	3
Another native	132
Spanish	3,309
Foreign	9
Only native	7,552
Native and Spanish	3,236
Only Spanish	74
