= Puka Puka (Cochabamba) =

Mountain in Bolivia

- Location within Bolivia

Highest point
- Elevation: 4,242 m (13,917 ft)
- Coordinates: 17°53′50″S 66°26′28″W

Geography
- Location: Bolivia, Cochabamba Department
- Parent range: Andes

Puka Puka (Quechua puka red, the reduplication indicates that there is a group or a complex of something, "a complex of red color", also spelled Puca Puca) is a 4,242-metre-high (13,917 ft) mountain in the Bolivian Andes. It is located in the Cochabamba Department, Arque Province, Arque Municipality.
