= Siwinqani (Arque) =

Mountain in Bolivia

- Location within Bolivia

Highest point
- Elevation: 3,600 m (11,800 ft)
- Coordinates: 17°51′09″S 66°23′45″W

Geography
- Location: Bolivia, Cochabamba Department
- Parent range: Andes

Siwinqani (Aymara siwinqa a kind of cactus, -ni a suffix, "the one with the siwinqa plant", also spelled Sehuencani) is a mountain in the Bolivian Andes which reaches a height of approximately 3,600 m (11,800 ft) high . It is located in the Cochabamba Department, Arque Province, Arque Municipality.
