= Michael Krasnow =

American model and writer

- Born: April 27, 1969; Rochester, New York, U.S.
- Died: October 9, 1997 (aged 28); Hollywood, Florida, U.S.
- Cause of death: Anorexia nervosa

Michael Krasnow (April 27, 1969 – October 9, 1997) was an American author. His autobiography, My Life as a Male Anorexic, described his life with his severe case of anorexia nervosa. Krasnow weighed 115 pounds when he was 16, but throughout most of his adult life maintained a weight of around 75 lbs. He stood at 5'9", giving him a body mass index of 11.1. He hoped his book would give strength to other male anorexics. Krasnow weighed 64 pounds when he died at age 28.

== Bibliography ==
My Life as a Male Anorexic, Binghamton, New York 1996, ISBN 0-7890-6029-9
