= Arque Municipality =

- Municipality
- Location within Bolivia
- Coordinates: 17°49′S 66°26′W
- Country: Bolivia
- Department: Cochabamba Department
- Province: Arque Province
- Seat: Arque

Government
  - Mayor: Hilarion Valencia Anabe (2007)
  - President: Gaby Gutierrez Hurtade (2007)
- Elevation: 11,500 ft (3,500 m)

Population (2001)
  - Total: 11,806
- Time zone: UTC-4 (BOT)

Arque Municipality is the first municipal section of the Arque Province in the Cochabamba Department, Bolivia. Its seat is Arque. At the time of census 2001 the municipality had 11,806 inhabitants. It has the lowest HDI of Bolivia with 0.311.

== Geography ==
Some of the highest mountains of the municipality are listed below:

- Apachita
- Awila Chukuña
- Chuymani
- Ch'uñawi
- Juch'uy Sayari
- Pichaqani
- Puka Puka
- Pukara
- Qala Pampa
- Sayari
- Siwinqani
- Yanakuna

== Cantons ==
The municipality is divided into two cantons. They are (their seats in parentheses):

- Arque Canton - (Arque)
- Colcha Canton - (Colcha)

== Languages ==
The languages spoken in the Arque Municipality are mainly Quechua and Spanish.

Language	Inhabitants
Quechua	10,793
Aymara	107
Guaraní	3
Another native	2
Spanish	2,185
Foreign	13
Only native	8,778
Native and Spanish	2,052
Only Spanish	134

== See also ==
- Arque River
