= Tacopaya =

Tacopaya Takupaya
- Location of Tacopaya within Bolivia
- Coordinates: 17°49′0″S 66°32′0″W
- Country: Bolivia
- Department: Cochabamba Department
- Province: Arque Province
- Municipality: Tacopaya Municipality
- Canton: Tacopaya Canton

Population (2001)
  - Total: 137
- Time zone: UTC-4 (BOT)

Tacopaya (from Quechua: Takupaya) is a village in the Cochabamba Department in central Bolivia. It is the seat of the Tacopaya Municipality, the second municipal section of the Arque Province.
