= Arque =

- Location in Bolivia
- Coordinates: 17°48′00″S 66°23′00″W
- Country: Bolivia
- Department: Cochabamba Department
- Province: Arque Province
- Municipality: Arque Municipality
- Canton: Arque Canton
- Elevation: 10,735 ft (3,272 m)

Population (2001)
  - Total: 487
- Time zone: UTC-4 (BOT)

Arque is a location in the Cochabamba Department, Bolivia. It is the seat of Arque Province and Arque Municipality. Arque is situated at an elevation of 10,735 ft (3,272 m) on the northern bank of Arque River. At the time of census 2001 it had a population of 487.

== See also ==
- Railway stations in Bolivia
