= Robert Wood (television executive) =

American television executive (1925–1986)

Robert Dennis Wood (April 17, 1925 – May 20, 1986) was an American television executive from Boise, Idaho who was president of CBS from 1969 to 1976. He, along with his vice president Fred Silverman, initiated the network's "rural purge" in the early 1970s, which influenced much of American television at the time. The purge canceled long-running and popular rural-oriented shows like Green Acres and The Beverly Hillbillies in order to introduce more urban-oriented shows targeted at the youth market, such as All in the Family, which reshaped American television by depicting issues previously considered unsuitable for an American network television comedy.

He died in Santa Monica, California.
