= Arque River =

Arque

Location
- Country: Bolivia
- Region: Cochabamba Department

Arque River is one of the headwaters of Río Grande and Mamoré River in Bolivia. The Arque has its source in the Kimsa Cruz mountain range on the western slope of the mountain Waylluma at 17°41′0″S 66°43′30″W, 50 km northeast of the mining city Oruro, and 65 km southwest of Cochabamba.

The river flows 50 km in a southeasterly direction before it turns northeast. At kilometer 58, there is the provincial capital Arque on the northern bank of the river, at kilometer 72 the village Umani on the southern bank, and at kilometer 85 the town of Capinota on the northern bank.

The watershed of Arque River comprises 2,224 km^{2}. At Capinota, the base flow of the river is 2 to 2.5 m^{3}/s. However, when the river rises during the rainy season (November–April), the flow can be up to 900 m^{3}/s. The sediments which Arque River carries in the rainy season can be up to 120 g/L.

After a total of 88 km the Arque joins Rocha River at 17°42′10″S 66°14′45″W at an elevation of 2,350 m to form Caine River. Caine River, after another 162 km, merges into Rìo Grande which after a total of 1,438 km from the source of Rocha River joins Ichilo River.
