= Kanata metropolitan area =

Kanata metropolitan area Area Metropolitana de Kanata
- Conurbation
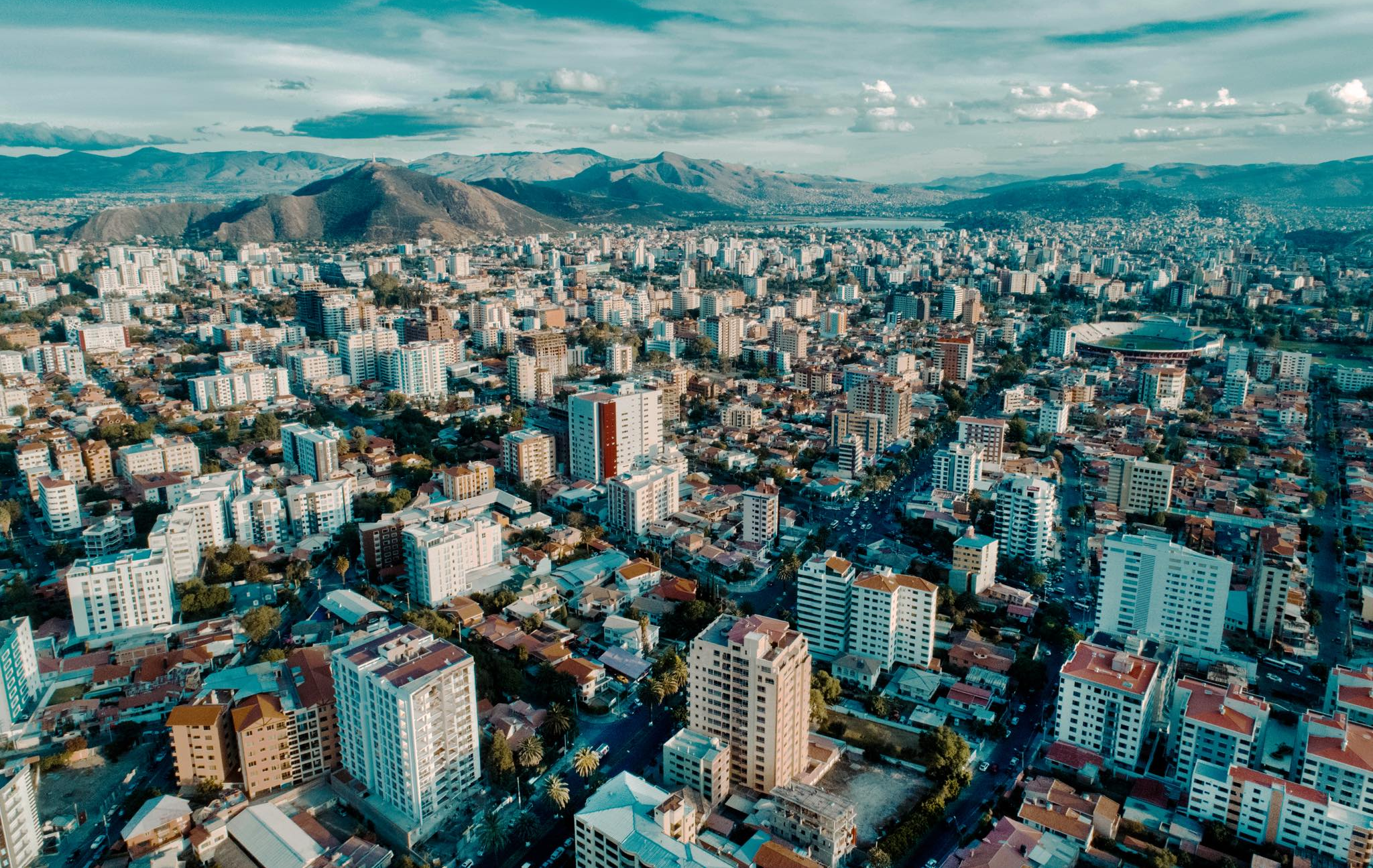
- View of the Kanata Metropolitan Area

- Location in Bolivia
- Coordinates: 17.34678°S 66.222187°W
- Country: Bolivia
- Provinces: Cercado, Chapare, Quillacollo

Area
  - Total: 2,611 km^{2} (1,008 sq mi)
- Elevation: 2,572 m (8,438 ft)

Population (2012)
  - Total: 1,370,104
- Time zone: UTC-4

The Kanata metropolitan area (Spanish: Área Metropolitana de Kanata) is the Metropolitan Region of the Department of Cochabamba. The region is made up of the municipalities of Cochabamba, Colcapirhua, Quillacollo, Sacaba, Sipe Sipe, Tiquipaya and Vinto, adding a total of seven con-urbanized municipalities. It limits to the north with the municipalities of Cocapata and Villa Tunari, to the west with the municipalities of Morochata and Tapacarí to the south with the municipalities of Arbieto, Arque, Capinota, San Benito, Santiváñez, Sicaya and Tolata to the east with the municipalities of Colomi and Tiraque. being the penultimate included as part of this region in its plans for future development, the municipalities of the metropolitan area are arranged in an east–west direction and vice versa, structured by the most important road in the country, Route 4. With a total area of 2,611 km^{2} where approximately 1.5 million inhabitants coexist (INE projections, 2022).

== Municipalities ==
- Cochabamba - Capital of Cochabamba Department.
- Sacaba - 13 kilometers southwest of Cochabamba.
- Quillacollo - 14 kilometers southwest of Cochabamba.
- Colcapirhua - 9 kilometers southwest of Cochabamba.
- Tiquipaya - 11 kilometers southwest of Cochabamba.
- Vinto - 17 kilometers southwest of Cochabamba.
- Sipe Sipe - 22 kilometers southwest of Cochabamba.

== See also ==
- Mi Tren
