= Pichaqani (Vinto) =

Mountain in Bolivia

- Location within Bolivia

Highest point
- Elevation: 4,240 m (13,910 ft)
- Coordinates: 17°18′33″S 66°24′12″W

Geography
- Location: Bolivia, Cochabamba Department
- Parent range: Andes

Pichaqani (Aymara pichaqa, phichaqa, piqacha a big needle, -ni a suffix, "the one with a big needle", also spelled Pichacani) is a 4,240-metre-high (13,910 ft) mountain in the Bolivian Andes. It is located in the Cochabamba Department, Quillacollo Province, Vinto Municipality. Pichaqani lies southwest of Tunari and southeast of Phullu Punchu.
