= Jukumarini (Cochabamba) =

Mountain in Bolivia

- Location within Bolivia

Highest point
- Coordinates: 17°20′45″S 66°21′10″W

Geography
- Location: Bolivia, Cochabamba Department
- Parent range: Andes, Tunari mountain range

Jukumarini (Aymara jukumari bear, -ni a suffix to indicate ownership, "the one with a bear") is a mountain in the Tunari mountain range of the Bolivian Andes. It is situated in the Cochabamba Department, Quillacollo Province, Vinto Municipality, south of the mountain Tunari.

== See also ==
- Jatun Q'asa
- Puma Apachita
- Wayna Tunari
