= Wayna Tunari =

Mountain in Bolivia

- Location within Bolivia

Highest point
- Elevation: 4,800 m (15,700 ft)
- Coordinates: 17°15′58″S 66°24′15″W

Geography
- Location: Bolivia, Cochabamba Department
- Parent range: Andes, Tunari mountain range

Wayna Tunari (Aymara and Quechua wayna young) is a mountain in the Tunari mountain range of the Bolivian Andes which reaches a height of approximately 4,800 m (15,748 ft). It is situated in the Cochabamba Department, Ayopaya Province, Morochata Municipality, and in the Quillacollo Province, Vinto Municipality. It lies northwest of Tunari.

== See also ==
- Jatun Q'asa
- Puma Apachita
