= Yuraq Yaku (Bolivia) =

Mountain in Bolivia

- Location within Bolivia

Highest point
- Elevation: 3,232 m (10,604 ft)
- Coordinates: 17°30′01″S 66°22′38″W

Geography
- Location: Bolivia, Cochabamba Department
- Parent range: Andes

Yuraq Yaku (Quechua yuraq white, yaku water, "white water", also spelled Yuraj Yaco) is a 3,232-metre-high (10,604 ft) mountain in the Bolivian Andes. It is located in the Cochabamba Department, Quillacollo Province, Sipe Sipe Municipality. Yuraq Yaku lies southeast of Inka Laqaya.
