= Rocha River =

Coordinates: 17.7028°S 66.2458°W

Rocha
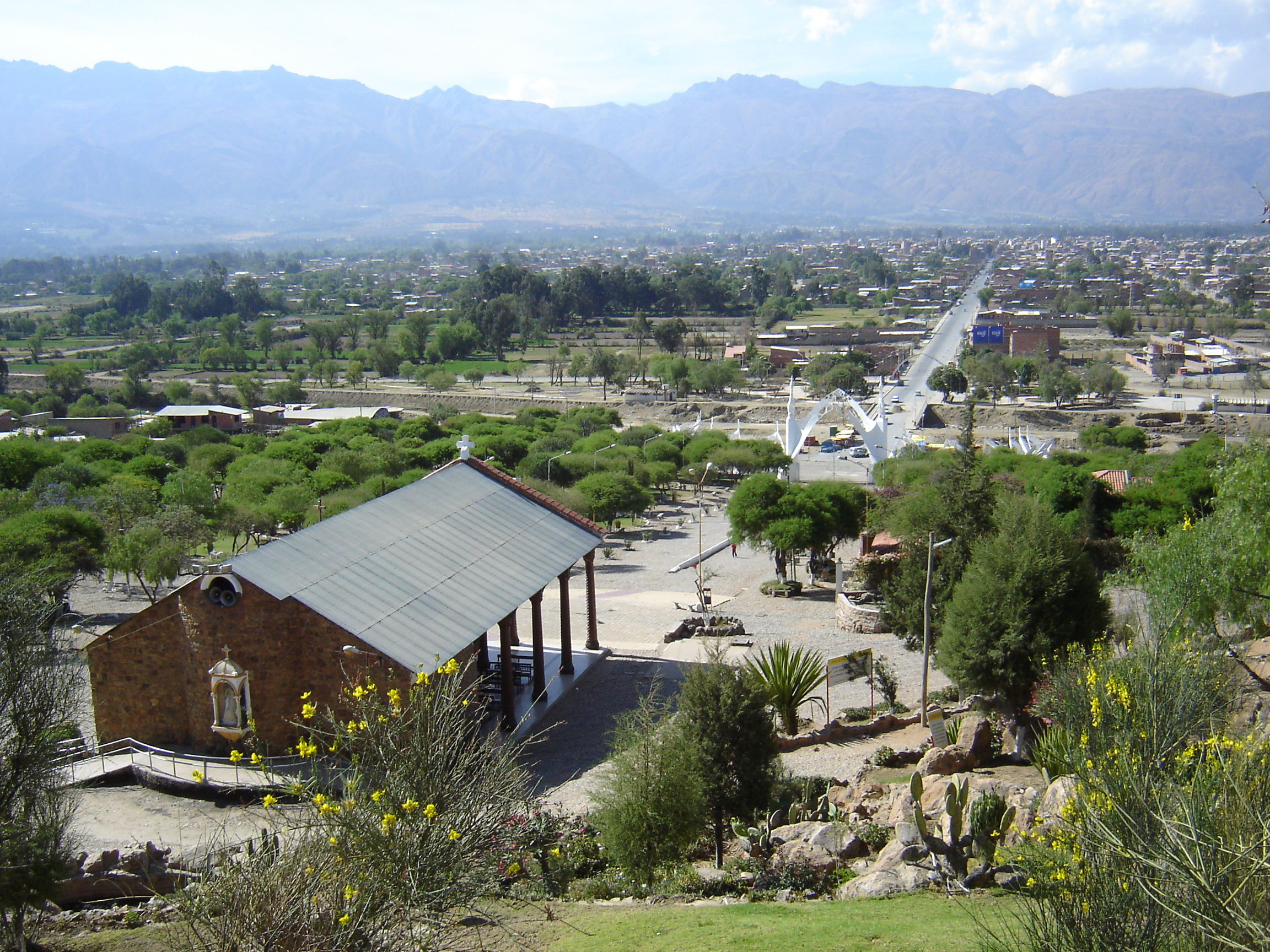
- A bridge across the Rocha River (in the middle) in Quillacollo
- Native name: Kunturillu (Quechua)

Location
- Country: Bolivia
- Region: Cochabamba Department

Physical characteristics
- Mouth: Caine River

Basin features
- Tributaries
  - left: Pukara Mayu
  - right: Tapacari River, Ch'aki Mayu, Wiluma, Chilla, Tupuraya

Rocha River or Kunturillu River (Quechua kunturillu black and white, Hispanicized spelling Condorillo, also Kundurillu, Kunturillo) which upstream is called Mayllanku (Maylanco) is a Bolivian river in the Cochabamba Department, Quillacollo Province. From the point of the confluence with the Arque River the river is called Caine River.

The river owes its present name to Captain Martín de la Rocha who diverted the river in 1565.

== Gallery ==
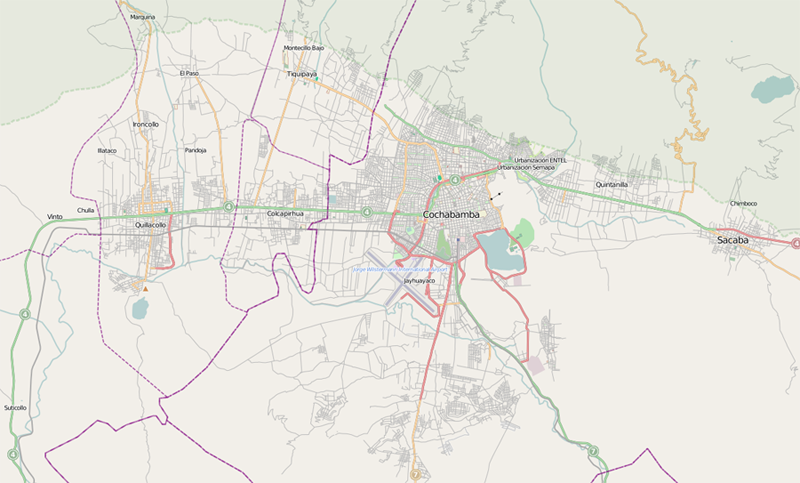
Map of Cochabamba showing Rocha River as it flows west from Sacaba to Quillacollo and then turning to the south

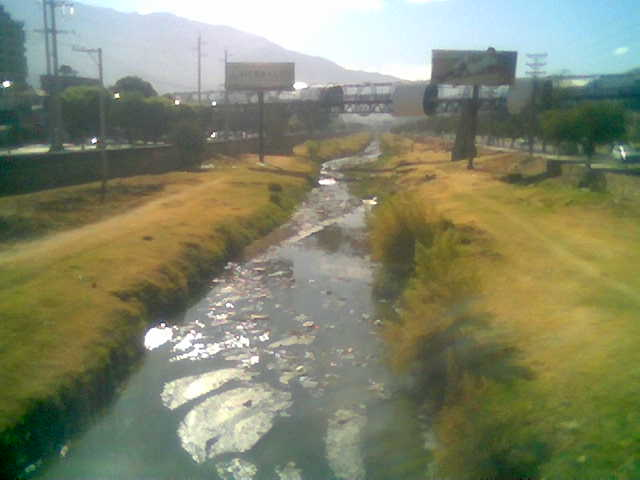
Rocha River

== See also ==
- Ch'aki Mayu
- List of rivers of Bolivia

== Sources and notes ==
- lib.utexas.edu Detailed map of the area
- Rand McNally, The New International Atlas, 1993.
