= T'ula Jayani Apachita =

Mountain in Bolivia

- Location within Bolivia

Highest point
- Coordinates: 17°15′20″S 66°18′45″W

Geography
- Location: Bolivia, Cochabamba Department, Quillacollo Province
- Parent range: Andes

T'ula Jayani Apachita (Hispanicized spelling Thola Jayani Apacheta) is a mountain in the Bolivian Andes. It is situated in the Cochabamba Department, Quillacollo Province, Quillacollo Municipality, southwest of the lake Parinani.

== See also ==
- Tunari
- Wari Warini
