= Qina Qina (Cochabamba) =

Mountain in Bolivia

- Location within Bolivia

Highest point
- Elevation: 4,800 m (15,700 ft)
- Coordinates: 17°13′21″S 66°23′50″W

Geography
- Location: Bolivia, Cochabamba Department
- Parent range: Andes

Qina Qina (Aymara qina qina an Andean cane flute, also meaning 'full of holes', also spelled Khena Khena) is a mountain in the Bolivian Andes which reaches a height of approximately 4,800 m (15,700 ft). It is located in the Cochabamba Department, Quillacollo Province, Quillacollo Municipality, at the border of the Morochata Municipality.
