= Yuraq Yaku =

Yuraq Yaku (Quechua: yuraq white, yaku water, "white water", also spelled Yurac Yaco, Yuracc Yaco, Yuracc Yacu, Yuraj Yaco, Yuraj Yacu, Yuracyaco, Yuracyacu, Yurajyaco, Yurajyacu) may refer to:

- Yuracyacu District, a district in the San Martín Region, Peru
- Yuraq Yaku (Aija), a mountain in the Aija Province, Ancas Region, Peru
- Yuraq Yaku (Bolivia), a mountain in Bolivia
- Yuraq Yaku (Huari), a mountain in the Huari Province, Ancash Region, Peru
