= Wari Warini =

Mountain in Bolivia

- Location within Bolivia

Highest point
- Elevation: 4,832 m (15,853 ft)
- Coordinates: 17°13′31″S 66°21′27″W

Geography
- Location: Bolivia, Cochabamba Department, Quillacollo Province
- Parent range: Andes

Wari Warini (Aymara, wari vicuña, the reduplication signifies that there is a group of something, -ni a suffix to indicate ownership, "the one with many vicuñas", or from wari a liquid, wari wari very liquid, also spelled Huari Huarini) is a mountain in the Bolivian Andes, about 4,832 m (15,853 ft) high. It is situated in the Cochabamba Department, Quillacollo Province, Quillacollo Municipality, east of the Ipilla Mayu.

== See also ==
- Jatun Q'asa
- Tunari
