= Sankayuni (Cochabamba) =

Mountain in Bolivia

- Location within Bolivia

Highest point
- Elevation: 4,560 m (14,960 ft)
- Coordinates: 17°10′00″S 66°27′42″W

Geography
- Location: Bolivia, Cochabamba Department
- Parent range: Andes

Sankayuni (Aymara sankayu the edible fruit of the thorny Jachakana shrub, -ni a suffix to indicate ownership, "the one with the sankayu fruit", also spelled Sankhayuni) is a mountain in the Bolivian Andes which reaches a height of approximately 4,560 m (14,960 ft). It is located in the Cochabamba Department, Quillacollo Province, Quillacollo Municipality. Sankayuni lies northwest of Jatun Q'asa.
