= Wisk'achani (Quillacollo) =

Mountain in Bolivia

- Location within Bolivia

Highest point
- Elevation: 3,611 m (11,847 ft)
- Coordinates: 17°28′50″S 66°24′42″W

Geography
- Location: Bolivia, Cochabamba Department
- Parent range: Andes

Wisk'achani (Aymara wisk'acha a rodent,-ni a suffix, "the one with the viscacha", also spelled Viscachani) is a 3,611-metre-high (11,847 ft) mountain in the Bolivian Andes. It is located in the Cochabamba Department, Quillacollo Province, Sipe Sipe Municipality. Wisk'achani lies northwest of Inka Laqaya.
