= Puka Salli =

Mountain in Bolivia

- Location within Bolivia

Highest point
- Elevation: 4,640 m (15,220 ft)
- Coordinates: 17°14′22″S 66°16′21″W

Geography
- Location: Bolivia, Cochabamba Department
- Parent range: Andes

Puka Salli (Quechua puka red, salli sulfur, red sulfur, also spelled Puca Salle) is a mountain in the Bolivian Andes which reaches a height of approximately 4,640 m (15,220 ft). It is located in the Cochabamba Department, Quillacollo Province, Quillacollo Municipality. Puka Salli lies southeast of Awila Wachana Punta and northeast of a lake named Parinani Quta (Aymara for "the lake with flamgingos").
