= Jatun Yuraq Q'asa =

Mountain in Bolivia

- Location within Bolivia

Highest point
- Elevation: 4,160 m (13,650 ft)
- Coordinates: 17°07′00″S 66°30′39″W

Geography
- Location: Bolivia, Cochabamba Department
- Parent range: Andes

Jatun Yuraq Q'asa (Quechua jatun big, yuraq white, q'asa mountain pass, "big, white mountain pass", also spelled Jatun Yuraj Khasa) is a mountain in the Bolivian Andes which reaches a height of approximately 4,160 m (13,650 ft). It is located in the Cochabamba Department, Ayopaya Province, Morochata Municipality. It lies northwest of Liqiliqini.
