= Quna Quna Q'asa =

Mountain in Bolivia

- Location within Bolivia

Highest point
- Elevation: 4,720 m (15,490 ft)
- Coordinates: 17°12′21″S 66°18′51″W

Geography
- Location: Bolivia, Cochabamba Department
- Parent range: Andes

Quna Quna Q'asa (Quechua quna quna a species of moth (Scrobipalpula), q'asa mountain pass, also spelled Khona Khona Khasa) is a mountain in the Bolivian Andes which reaches a height of approximately 4,720 m (15,490 ft). It is located in the Cochabamba Department, Quillacollo Province, Quillacollo Municipality. Quna Quna Q'asa lies southeast of Wila Qullu Punta and Q'illu Suchusqa.
