= Ch'uñawi (Cochabamba) =

Mountain in Bolivia

- Location within Bolivia

Highest point
- Elevation: 3,700 m (12,100 ft)
- Coordinates: 17°25′49″S 66°27′04″W

Geography
- Location: Bolivia, Cochabamba Department
- Parent range: Andes

Ch'uñawi (Aymara for a place where potatoes are spread as part of the procedure to prepare ch'uñu, also spelled Chunahui, Chuñahui) is a mountain in the Bolivian Andes which reaches a height of approximately 3,700 m (12,100 ft). It is located in the Cochabamba Department, Quillacollo Province, Sipe Sipe Municipality. Ch'uñawi lies southeast of Tikrasqa.
