= Liqiliqini =

Liqiliqini (Aymara liqiliqi, liqi liqi Southern lapwing or Andean lapwing, -ni a suffix, "the one with the Southern lapwing (or Andean lapwing)", also spelled Lekhe Lekheni, Leke Lekeni, Lecceleccene, Lejelejene, Lekelekeni) may refer to:

- Liqiliqini (Cochabamba), a mountain in the Cochabamba Department, Bolivia
- Liqiliqini (La Paz), a mountain in the La Paz Department, Bolivia
- Liqiliqini (Peru), a mountain in Peru
