= Jukumarini =

Jukumarini (Aymara jukumari bear, -ni a suffix to indicate ownership, "the one with a bear", Hispanicized spellings Jucumarini, Ucumarini) may refer to:

- Jukumarini (Cochabamba), a mountain in the Cochabamba Department, Bolivia
- Jukumarini (Larecaja), a mountain in the Larecaja Province, La Paz Department, Bolivia
- Jukumarini (Loayza), a mountain in the Loayza Province, La Paz Department, Bolivia
- Jukumarini (Murillo), a mountain in the Murillo Province, La Paz Department, Bolivia
- Jukumarini Lake, a lake in Peru
