= Qiñwa Q'asa =

Mountain in Bolivia

- Location within Bolivia

Highest point
- Elevation: 3,760 m (12,340 ft)
- Coordinates: 17°23′18″S 66°27′13″W

Geography
- Location: Bolivia, Cochabamba Department
- Parent range: Andes

Qiñwa Q'asa (qiñwa a kind of tree (polylepis), q'asa mountain pass, "qiñwa pass", also spelled Kheñwa Khasa) is a mountain in the Bolivian Andes which reaches a height of approximately 3,760 m (12,340 ft). It is located in the Cochabamba Department, Quillacollo Province, Sipe Sipe Municipality. Qiñwa Q'asa lies northwest of Q'ara Apachita, east of the village of Janq'u Jaqhi ("white cliff", Jankho Jakke).
