= Atuq Wachana (Quillacollo) =

Mountain in Bolivia

- Location within Bolivia

Highest point
- Elevation: 3,700 m (12,100 ft)
- Coordinates: 17°28′35″S 66°27′56″W

Geography
- Location: Bolivia, Cochabamba Department
- Parent range: Andes

Atuq Wachana (Quechua atuq fox, wacha birth, to give birth, -na a suffix, 'where the fox is born', also spelled Atoj Huachana) is a mountain in the Bolivian Andes which reaches a height of approximately 3,700 m (12,100 ft). It is located in the Cochabamba Department, at the border of the Quillacollo Province, Sipe Sipe Municipality, and the Tapacarí Province. Atuq Wachana lies southeast of Pichaqani.
