= Wila Quta =

Wila Quta or Wilaquta (Aymara for "red lake", other spellings Huila Kkota, Huilacota, Vila Ccota, Vila Cota, Velacota, Vilaccota, Vilacota, Vilajota, Vilakkota, Vilakota, Wila Khota, Wila Kkota, Wila Kota) may refer to:

== Lakes ==
- Wila Quta (Potosí), in the Potosí Department, Bolivia
- Wilaquta (Arequipa), in the Arequipa Region, Peru

== Mountains ==
- Wila Quta (Apurímac-Arequipa), on the border of the Apurímac Region and the Arequipa Region, Peru
- Wila Quta (Cochabamba), in the Cochabamba Department, Bolivia
- Wila Quta (La Paz), in the Murillo Province, La Paz Department, Bolivia
- Wila Quta (Larecaja), in the Larecaja Province, La Paz Department, Bolivia
- Wila Quta (Loayza), in the Loayza Province, La Paz Department, Bolivia
- Wila Quta (Oruro), in the Oruro Department, Bolivia
- Wilaquta (Cusco), in the Quispicanchi Province, Cusco Region, Peru
- Wilaquta (Carabaya), in the Carabaya Province, Puno Region, Peru
- Wilaquta (Moquegua-Puno), on the border of the Moquegua Region and the Puno Region, Peru
- Wilaquta (Sandia), in the Sandia Province, Puno Region, Peru

== Places ==
- Wila Quta, Sucre, in the Chuquisaca Department, Bolivia
