= Qillqata (Cochabamba) =

Mountain in Bolivia

- Location within Bolivia

Highest point
- Elevation: 4,720 m (15,490 ft)
- Coordinates: 17°03′59″S 66°17′19″W

Geography
- Location: Bolivia, Cochabamba Department, Quillacollo Province
- Parent range: Andes

Qillqata (Aymara qillqaña to write, -ta a suffix, "written" or "something written", also spelled Khellkhata) is a mountain in the Bolivian Andes which reaches a height of approximately 4,720 m (15,490 ft). It is located in the Cochabamba Department, Quillacollo Province, Quillacollo Municipality. Qillqata lies southeast of Uqi Salli Punta.
