= Sayt'u Qucha =

Sayt'u Qucha or Sayt'uqucha (Quechua Quechua for "rectangle lake", also spelled Saythu Khocha,, Sayto Khocha, Saytu Khocha, Saytu Kocha, Saytu Qhocha, Saitococha, Saytococha) may refer to:

- Sayt'u Qucha (Tiquipaya), a lake in the Tiquipaya Municipality, Quillacollo Province, Cochabamba Department, Bolivia
- Sayt'u Qucha (Tiraque), a lake in the Tiraque Municipality, Tiraque Province, Cochabamba Department, Bolivia
- Sayt'uqucha (Lampa), a lake in the Lampa Province, Puno Region, Peru
- Sayt'uqucha (San Román), a lake in the San Román Province, Puno Region, Peru
- Sayt'uqucha (Sandia), a lake in the Sandia Province, Puno Region, Peru
