= Llamayuq Q'asa (Bolivia) =

Mountain in Bolivia

- Location within Bolivia

Highest point
- Elevation: 4,640 m (15,220 ft)
- Coordinates: 16°55′12″S 66°31′43″W

Geography
- Location: Bolivia, Cochabamba Department
- Parent range: Andes

Llamayuq Q'asa (Quechua llama llama, -yuq a suffix, q'asa mountain pass, "mountain pass with llamas", also spelled Llamayoj Khasa) is a mountain in the Bolivian Andes which reaches a height of approximately 4,640 m (15,220 ft). It is located in the Cochabamba Department, Ayopaya Province, Cocapata Municipality. Llamayuq Q'asa lies northeast of a lake named Wallatani Quta.
