= Qiñwani (Cochabamba) =

Mountain in Bolivia

- Location within Bolivia

Highest point
- Elevation: 4,360 m (14,300 ft)
- Coordinates: 17°20′16″S 66°25′36″W

Geography
- Location: Bolivia, Cochabamba Department
- Parent range: Andes

Qiñwani (Aymara qiñwa, qiwña a kind of tree (polylepis), -ni a suffix, "the one with the qiwña tree", also spelled Kheñwani) is a mountain in the Bolivian Andes which reaches a height of approximately 4,360 m (14,300 ft). It is located in the Cochabamba Department, Quillacollo Province, on the border of the Sipe Sipe Municipality and the Vinto Municipality. Qiñwani lies northwest of Yana Qaqa.
