= Quillacollo Municipality =

- Municipality
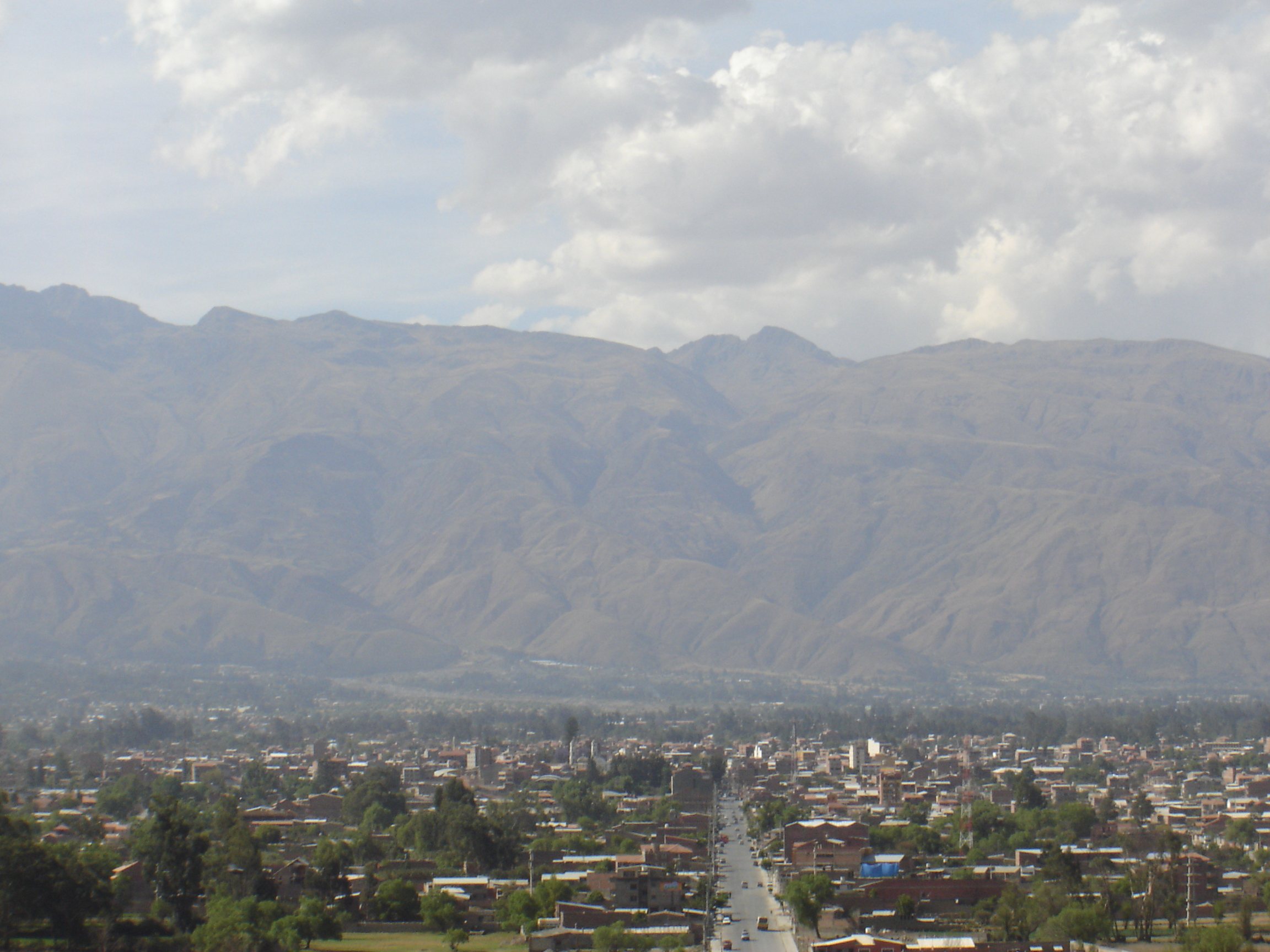
- Quillacollo

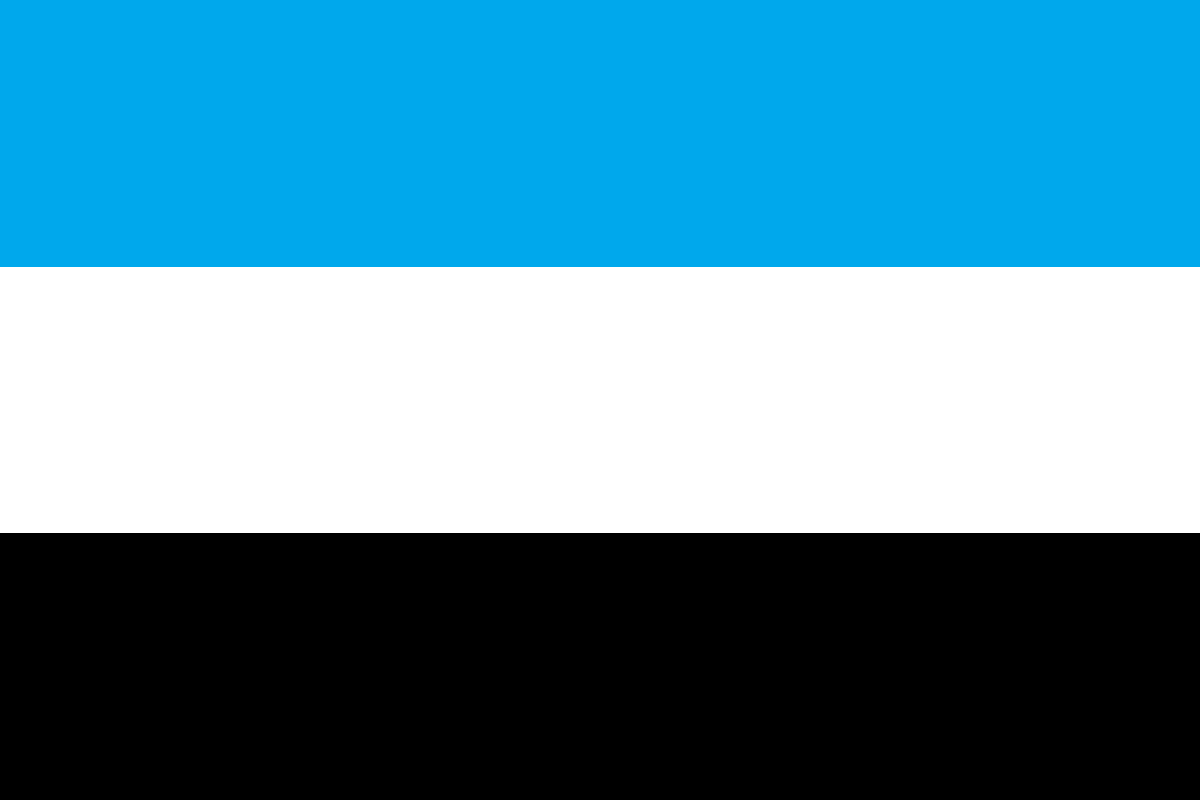
- Flag

- Location of the Quillacollo Municipality within Bolivia
- Coordinates: 17°15′0″S 66°20′0″W
- Country: Bolivia
- Department: Cochabamba Department
- Province: Quillacollo Province
- Seat: Quillacollo

Government
  - Mayor: Hugo Cesar Miguel Candia (2007)
  - President: Marcelo Galindo Gómez (2007)

Area
  - Total: 220 sq mi (560 km^{2})

Population (2001)
  - Total: 104,206
- Time zone: UTC-4 (BOT)

Quillacollo Municipality is the first municipal section of the Quillacollo Province in the Cochabamba Department, Bolivia. Its capital is Quillacollo. At the time of census 2001 the municipality had 104,206 inhabitants.

== Geography ==
One of the highest peaks of the municipality is Tunari at 5,023 m (16,480 ft). Other mountains are listed below:

- Awila Wachana Punta
- Ichhu Apachita
- Janq'u Qala
- Jatun Kimray Punta
- Jatun Punta
- Jatun Q'asa
- Kimsa Tinkuy
- K'ayrani
- Patilla Pata
- Pirwata
- Puka Salli
- Puma Apachita
- P'utu P'utu
- Qillqata
- Qina Qina
- Qullpani Punta
- Quna Quna Q'asa
- Q'illu Suchusqa
- Salla Q'asa
- Sankayuni
- T'ula Jayani Apachita
- Uqi Salli Punta
- Urqu Punta
- Wari Warini
- Wila Qullu Punta

== Subdivision ==
Quillacollo Municipality is divided into cantons.

| Kanton | Inhabitants (2001) | Seat | Inhabitants (2001) |
|---|---|---|---|
| Quillacollo Canton | 99,276 | Quillacollo | 74,980 |
| El Paso Canton | 4,930 | El Paso | 3,344 |

== See also ==
- Tunari National Park
