= Ayopaya =

Ayopaya Jayupaya Independencia
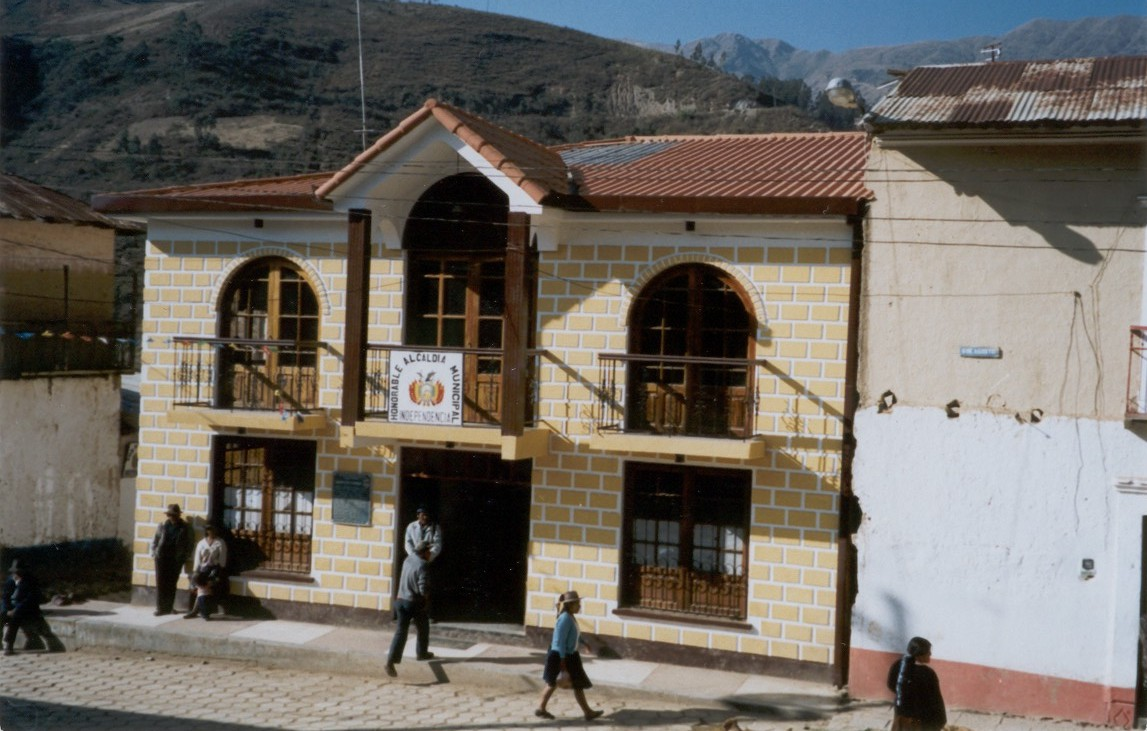
- Local government of Ayopaya

- Location within Bolivia
- Coordinates: 16°30′0″S 66°35′0″W
- Country: Bolivia
- Department: Cochabamba Department
- Province: Ayopaya Province
- Municipality: Ayopaya Municipality
- Canton: Ayopaya Canton

Population (2001)
  - Total: 2,014
- Time zone: UTC-4 (BOT)

Ayopaya or Independencia is a town in the Cochabamba Department, Bolivia. It is the capital of the Ayopaya Province and Ayopaya Municipality. At the time of census 2001 it had a population of 2,014.

== Climate ==
Climate data for Ayopaya (Villa de la Independencia), elevation 2,788 m (9,147 ft), (1973–2011)
Month	Jan	Feb	Mar	Apr	May	Jun	Jul	Aug	Sep	Oct	Nov	Dec	Year
Mean daily maximum °C (°F)	21.7 (71.1)	21.6 (70.9)	21.9 (71.4)	22.3 (72.1)	22.0 (71.6)	20.8 (69.4)	20.7 (69.3)	21.6 (70.9)	22.1 (71.8)	23.1 (73.6)	23.8 (74.8)	23.1 (73.6)	22.1 (71.7)
Daily mean °C (°F)	15.4 (59.7)	15.5 (59.9)	15.5 (59.9)	15.1 (59.2)	13.9 (57.0)	12.6 (54.7)	12.3 (54.1)	13.3 (55.9)	14.1 (57.4)	15.1 (59.2)	16.0 (60.8)	16.0 (60.8)	14.6 (58.2)
Mean daily minimum °C (°F)	9.0 (48.2)	9.2 (48.6)	9.0 (48.2)	7.8 (46.0)	5.8 (42.4)	4.4 (39.9)	3.9 (39.0)	5.0 (41.0)	6.1 (43.0)	7.3 (45.1)	8.2 (46.8)	8.7 (47.7)	7.0 (44.7)
Average precipitation mm (inches)	182.1 (7.17)	148.3 (5.84)	118.4 (4.66)	38.8 (1.53)	11.1 (0.44)	10.2 (0.40)	12.7 (0.50)	27.6 (1.09)	36.5 (1.44)	53.3 (2.10)	81.9 (3.22)	121.6 (4.79)	842.5 (33.18)
Average precipitation days	21.1	19.0	16.4	7.3	2.3	2.2	2.8	5.2	7.2	9.6	11.6	16.9	121.6
Source: Servicio Nacional de Meteorología e Hidrología de Bolivia
