= Wila Qullu (Cochabamba) =

Mountain in Bolivia

- Location within Bolivia

Highest point
- Elevation: 4,080 m (13,390 ft)
- Coordinates: 17°22′42″S 66°41′18″W

Geography
- Location: Bolivia, Cochabamba Department
- Parent range: Andes

Wila Qullu (Aymara wila blood, blood-red, qullu mountain, "red mountain", also spelled Wila Khollu, Wila Kkollu) is a mountain in the Bolivian Andes which reaches a height of approximately 4,080 m (13,390 ft). It is located in the Cochabamba Department, Ayopaya Province, Ayopaya Municipality. Wila Qullu lies southeast of the village of Juch'uy Wila Jaqhi (Quechua-Aymara for "little red rock", also spelled Juchuy Wila Jakke or Vilayaque Chico).
