= Q'illu Q'illu (Bolivia) =

Mountain in Bolivia

- Location within Bolivia

Highest point
- Elevation: 4,560 m (14,960 ft)
- Coordinates: 17°03′50″S 66°29′22″W

Geography
- Location: Bolivia, Cochabamba Department
- Parent range: Andes

Q'illu Q'illu (Aymara and Quechua q'illu yellow, the reduplication indicates that there is a group or a complex of something, "a complex of yellow", or q'illu q'illu a plant (Berberis bumaelifolia), also spelled Khellu Khellu) is a mountain in the Bolivian Andes which reaches a height of approximately 4,560 m (14,960 ft). It is located in the Cochabamba Department, Ayopaya Province, Morochata Municipality, northwest of the village of Qullqi Chaka (meaning "silver bridge", also spelled Colquechaca). It lies northeast of the lakes named Q'umir Qucha ("green lake", Khomer Khocha), Yana Qucha ("black lake", Yana Khocha), Parinani ("the one with flamingos") and Wallatani ("the one with Andean geese", Huallatani).
