= Cocapata Municipality =

Cocapata Municipality Kukapata
- Municipality
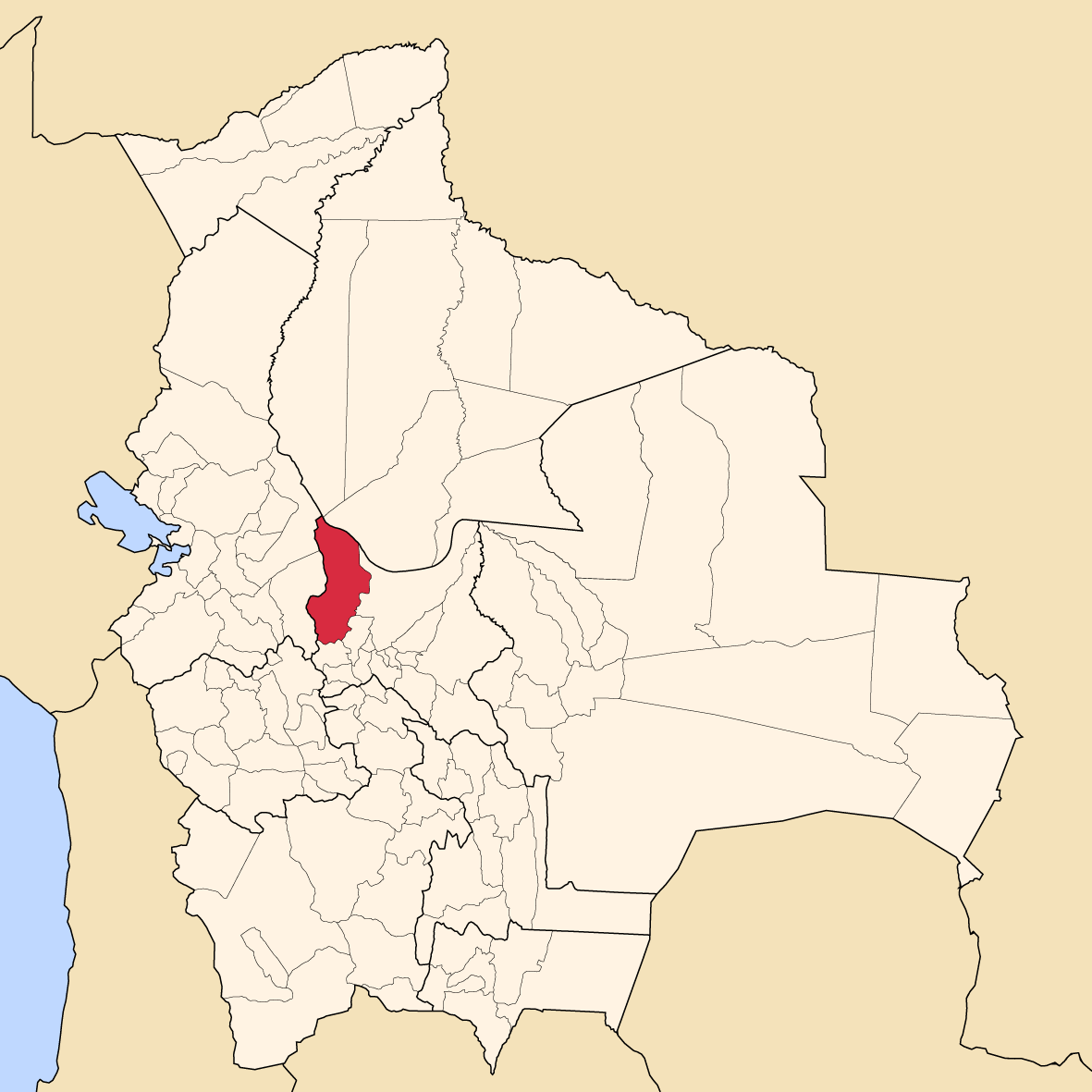
- Cochabamba Bolivia Ayopaya.png

- Flag

- Location within Bolivia
- Coordinates: 16°40′S 66°30′W
- Country: Bolivia
- Department: Cochabamba Department
- Province: Ayopaya Province
- Foundation: February 6, 2009
- Seat: Cocapata
- Time zone: UTC-4 (BOT)

Cocapata Municipality (Quechua: Kukapata) is the third municipal section of the Ayopaya Province in the Cochabamba Department in central Bolivia. Its seat Cocapata had 411 inhabitants at the time of census 2001.

Cocapata has many tourist attractions, as rock art (painting rocks) andean bear o (kucumari) the wild vicuñas in the region altamachi, many natural lakes which it has fish truchas and a variety of cultural heritage.

== See also ==
- Ch'uñu Pata
- Llamayuq Q'asa
- P'iq'iñ Q'ara
- Waka P'iqi
