= Shipping container clinic =

A shipping container clinic is a type of shipping container architecture using intermodal containers (shipping containers) as the structural element of a medical clinic that can be easily deployed to remote regions of the world. Shipping containers are ideal because of their inherent strength, wide availability and relatively low cost. In addition, and most relevant, shipping containers can be deployed anywhere in the world with the clinic already assembled within the container. This means pop-up clinics can be operational within days after deployment.

== History ==
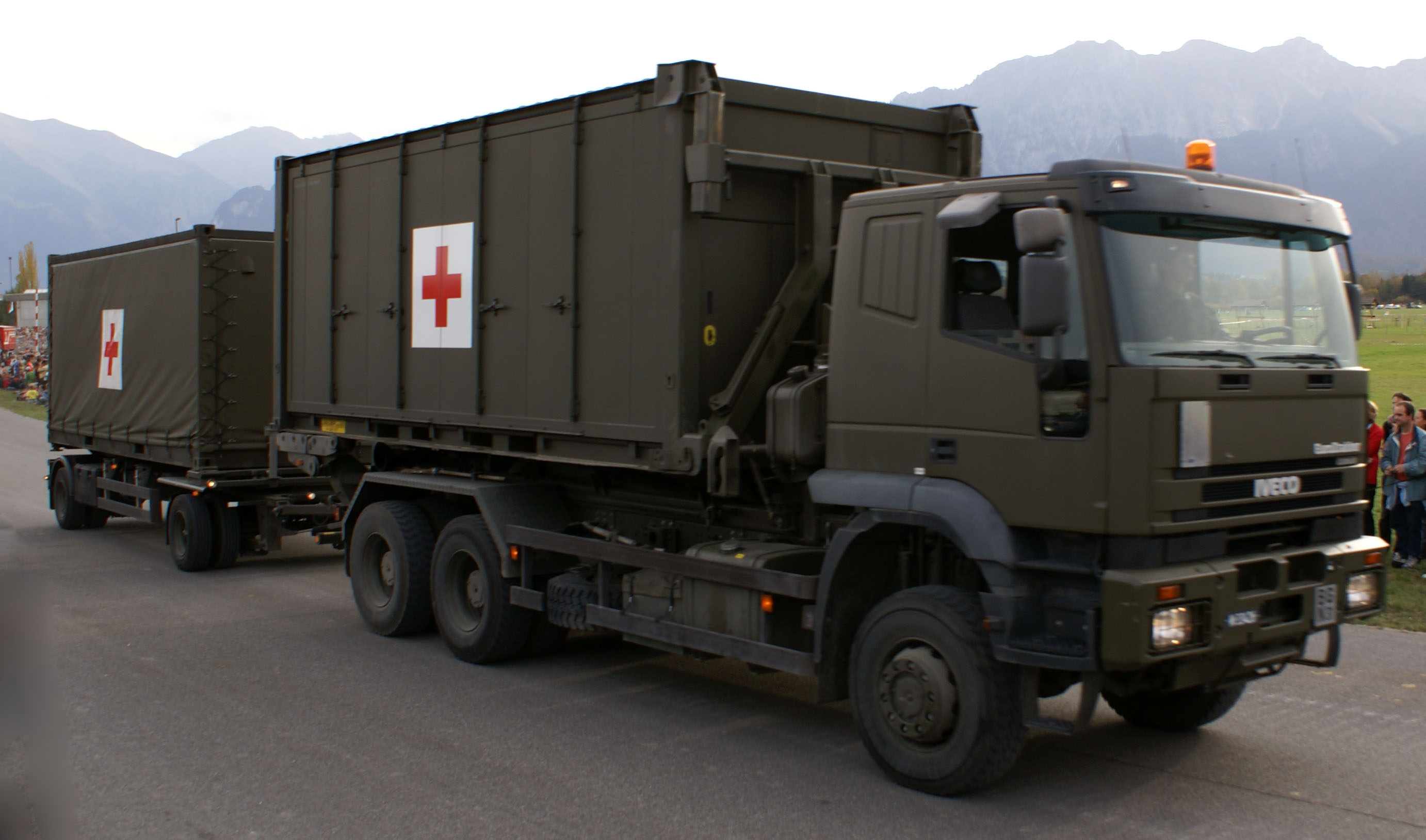
Transport truck of the Swiss Army with field hospital in container.

Several organizations have developed the concept of shipping container clinics.

In 2005, Hospitals of Hope produced a "Clinic In A Can" in a 45-foot trailer that was sent to Les Cayes, Haiti to provide medical relief. The 45 foot trailer is converted into five medical rooms, with each one being approximately 70 square feet. The container has since helped Hospitals of Hope provide care to over 30,000 residents of Haiti. In 2006, Pulitzer Prize winning author, Laurie Garrett, worked with Rensselaer Polytechnic Institute to create a prototype "Doc In A Box" based on Garrett's conceptual framework.

In June 2010, Hospitals of Hope sent two "Clinic In A Cans" to Haiti in partnership with Heart to Heart International in response to an earthquake. The containers were both 40 feet long and cost around $12,000 to build. In November 2010, Containers 2 Clinics sent a prototype clinic to be used on site at Grace Children's Hospital in Port-au-Prince, Haiti.

In April 2011, a three-unit Clinic In A Can was shipped to Haiti in partnership with Aslan Youth Ministries. This small hospital will be operated by Aslan Youth Ministries, an organization working in the north-east of Haiti. With a fault line running under where they work, steel shipping containers are safer than a concrete structure.

In August 2012, Clinics4All established its Global Clinic Donation Program (GCDP) to provide medical clinics free of charge to third-world governments through their respective departments or Ministries of Health as a means of improving access to healthcare in medically under-served and remote areas, particularly for children and women.

In March 2013, Clinic In A Can shipped a solar powered clinic to Mirebalais, Haiti in partnership with Global Vision Citadelle Ministries, as well as a radiology Clinic In A Can to Freetown, Sierra Leone. In July 2013, Arkitainer opened its doors as a UK based company specialising in the use of shipping containers for various community based projects. A recent proposal for a residential community complete with clinics, schooling and vocational training for Cape Town is currently underway.

Since 2017, Cipla, one of South Africa's largest pharmaceutical companies, has deployed moveable clinics to deprived areas to help with South Africa's COVID-19 vaccination program. As part of the Cipla Foundation's Sha’p Left project, these containers have been used as Centralised Chronic Medicine Dispensing and Distribution (CCMDD) points across South Africa, with the bulk of the projects in Gauteng and KwaZulu-Natal.
