= Awila Wachana Punta =

Mountain in Bolivia

- Location within Bolivia

Highest point
- Elevation: 4,720 m (15,490 ft)
- Coordinates: 17°13′10″S 66°17′24″W

Geography
- Location: Bolivia, Cochabamba Department
- Parent range: Andes

Awila Wachana Punta (Quechua awila eagle (from Spanish aguila) or grandmother (from Spanish abuela), wacha birth, to give birth, -na a suffix, awila wachana 'where the eagle is born', also spelled Aguila Huachana Punta) is a mountain in the Bolivian Andes which reaches a height of approximately 4,720 m (15,490 ft). It is located in the Cochabamba Department, Quillacollo Province, Quillacollo Municipality. Awila Wachana Punta lies east of Kimsa Tinkuy and a lake named Warawarani.
