= Phullu Punchu =

Mountain in Bolivia

- Location within Bolivia

Highest point
- Elevation: 4,640 m (15,220 ft)
- Coordinates: 17°17′50″S 66°25′30″W

Geography
- Location: Bolivia, Cochabamba Department
- Parent range: Andes, Tunari mountain range

Phullu Punchu (Quechua phullu mantilla, punchu poncho, also spelled Phullu Poncho) is a mountain in the Tunari mountain range of the Bolivian Andes which reaches a height of approximately 4,640 m (15,220 ft). It is located in the Cochabamba Department, Quillacollo Province, Vinto Municipality. Phullu Punchu lies southwest of Tunari.
