= Janq'u Qala (Cochabamba) =

Mountain in Bolivia

- Location within Bolivia

Highest point
- Elevation: 4,640 m (15,220 ft)
- Coordinates: 17°14′02″S 66°22′37″W

Geography
- Location: Bolivia, Cochabamba Department
- Parent range: Andes

Janq'u Qala (Aymara janq'u white, qala stone, "white stone", also spelled Janko Kala) is a mountain in the Bolivian Andes which reaches a height of approximately 4,640 m (15,220 ft). It is located in the Cochabamba Department, Quillacollo Province, Quillacollo Municipality. Janq'u Qala lies at the lake named Wathiya Quta (also spelled Batae, Batea, Beata).
