= P'iq'iñ Q'ara (Cochabamba) =

Mountain in Bolivia

- Location within Bolivia

Highest point
- Elevation: 4,480 m (14,700 ft)
- Coordinates: 16°59′44″S 66°32′24″W

Geography
- Location: Bolivia, Cochabamba Department
- Parent range: Andes

P'iq'iñ Q'ara (Aymara p'iq'iña head, q'ara bare, bald, p'iq'iña q'ara bald,"baldheaded", also spelled Phekheñ Khara) is a mountain in the Bolivian Andes which reaches a height of approximately 4,480 m (14,700 ft). It is located in the Cochabamba Department, Ayopaya Province, Cocapata Municipality. It lies northeast of the two lakes named Iskay Qucha (Quechua for "two lakes").
