= Silla Q'asa (Cochabamba) =

Mountain in Bolivia

- Location within Bolivia

Highest point
- Elevation: 4,480 m (14,700 ft)
- Coordinates: 17°05′12″S 66°26′33″W

Geography
- Location: Bolivia, Cochabamba Department
- Parent range: Andes

Silla Q'asa (Quechua silla gravel, q'asa mountain pass, "gravel pass", also spelled Silla Khasa) is a mountain in the Bolivian Andes which reaches a height of approximately 4,480 m (14,700 ft). It is located in the Cochabamba Department, Ayopaya Province, Morochata Municipality. It lies southeast and east of the lakes named Q'umir Qucha ("green lake", Khomer Khocha), Yana Qucha ("black lake", Yana Khocha), Parinani ("the one with flamingos") and Wallatani ("the one with Andean geese", Huallatani).
