= Wisk'achani (Ayopaya) =

Mountain in Bolivia

- Location within Bolivia

Highest point
- Elevation: 4,355 m (14,288 ft)
- Coordinates: 17°17′18″S 66°31′47″W

Geography
- Location: Bolivia, Cochabamba Department, Ayopaya Province
- Parent range: Andes

Wisk'achani (Aymara wisk'acha a rodent,-ni a suffix, "the one with the viscacha", also spelled Viscachani) is a 4,355-metre-high (14,288 ft) mountain in the Bolivian Andes. It is located in the Cochabamba Department, Ayopaya Province, Morochata Municipality. Wisk'achani lies north of the village of Chawpi Suyu (Chaupisuyo).
