= Inka Q'asa =

Mountain in Bolivia

- Location within Bolivia

Highest point
- Elevation: 4,160 m (13,650 ft)
- Coordinates: 16°52′25″S 66°44′13″W

Geography
- Location: Bolivia, Cochabamba Department
- Parent range: Andes

Inka Q'asa (Quechua inka Inca q'asa mountain pass, "Inca pass", also spelled Inca Khasa) is a mountain in the Bolivian Andes which reaches a height of approximately 4,160 m (13,650 ft). It is located in the Cochabamba Department, Ayopaya Province, Morochata Municipality. The Ch'uya Mayu ("crystal-clear river") originates west of the mountain. It flows to the west as a left tributary of the Río Negro (Spanish for "black river").
