= Colcapirhua Municipality =

Colcapirhua Qullqapirwa
- Municipality
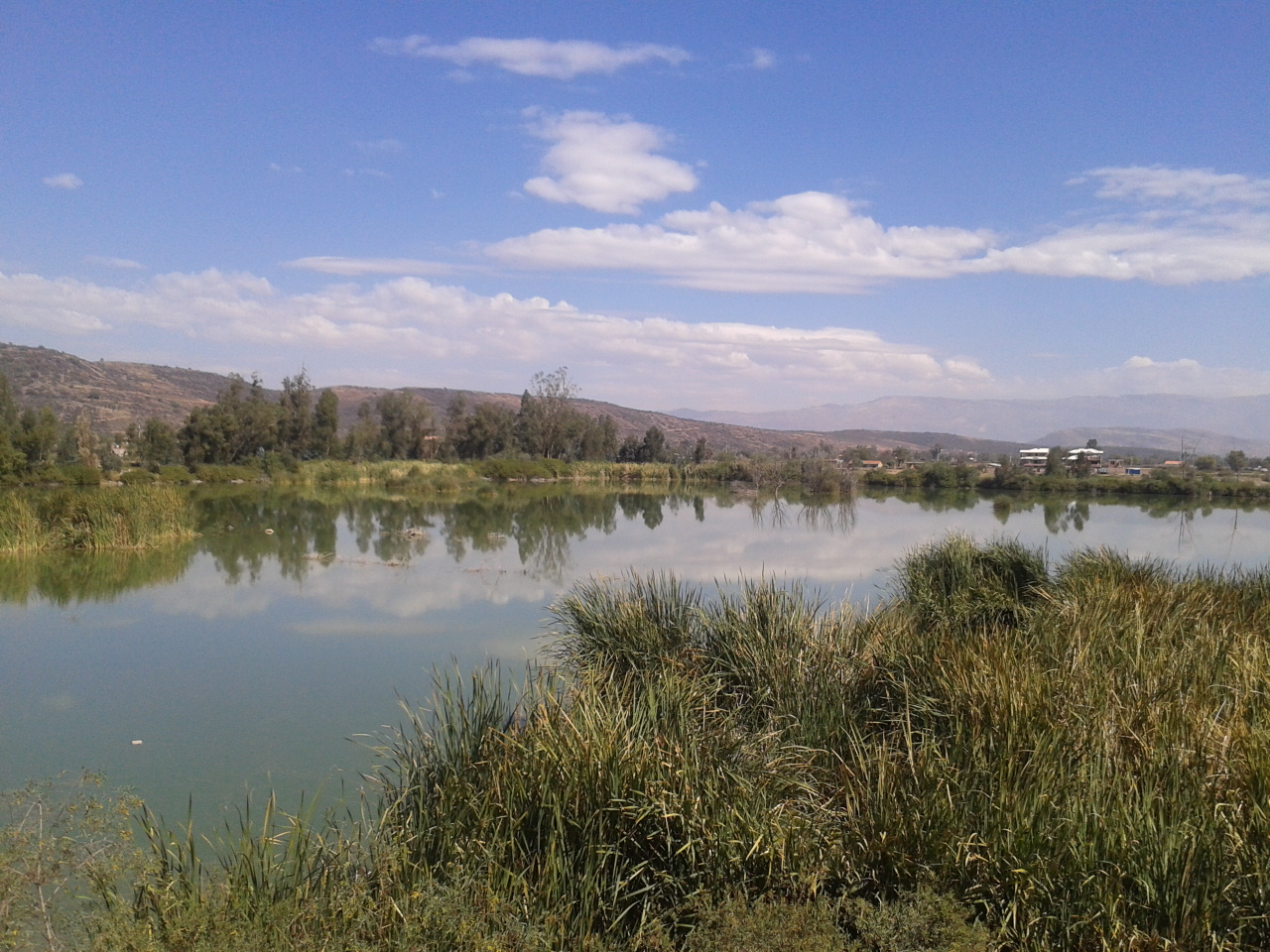
- Ceramil Lake, Colcapirhua Municipality

- Location within Bolivia
- Coordinates: 17°24′S 66°14′W
- Country: Bolivia
- Department: Cochabamba Department
- Province: Quillacollo Province
- Seat: Colcapirhua

Government
  - Mayor: Longines Nogales Fuentes (2007)
  - President: Marisol Nina Mercado (2007)

Population (2001)
  - Total: 41,980
  - Ethnicities: Quechuas
- Time zone: UTC-4 (BOT)

Colcapirhua (in Hispanicized spelling) or Qullqapirwa (Quechua) is the fifth municipal section of the Quillacollo Province in the Cochabamba Department, Bolivia. Its seat is Colcapirhua.

== Cantons ==
The municipality is divided into two cantons. They are (their seats in parentheses):

- Colcapirhua Canton - (Colcapirhua)
- Santa Rosa Canton - (Santa Rosa)
