= Waka P'iqi =

Mountain in Bolivia

- Location within Bolivia

Highest point
- Elevation: 4,578 m (15,020 ft)
- Coordinates: 16°54′45″S 66°38′11″W

Geography
- Location: Bolivia, Cochabamba Department
- Parent range: Andes

Waka P'iqi (Aymara waka cow, p'iqi, p'iq'iña, phiq'i, phiq'iña head, "cow head", also spelled Huaca Pekhe) is a 4,578-metre-high (15,020 ft) mountain in the Bolivian Andes. It is located in the Cochabamba Department, Ayopaya Province, Cocapata Municipality, west of the village of Chorito. Wak'a P'iqi lies at the left bank of the Jatun Mayu ("big river").
