= Pichaqani (Quillacollo-Tapacarí) =

Mountain in Bolivia

- Location within Bolivia

Highest point
- Elevation: 3,799 m (12,464 ft)
- Coordinates: 17°28′21″S 66°28′28″W

Geography
- Location: Bolivia, Cochabamba Department
- Parent range: Andes

Pichaqani (Aymara pichaqa, phichaqa, piqacha a big needle, -ni a suffix, "the one with a big needle", also spelled Pichacani) is a 3,799-metre-high (12,464 ft) mountain in the Bolivian Andes. It is located in the Cochabamba Department, at the border of the Quillacollo Province, Sipe Sipe Municipality, and the Tapacarí Province. Pichaqani lies southeast of Yuraq Q'asa.
