= Wila Quta (Cochabamba) =

Mountain in Bolivia

- Location within Bolivia

Highest point
- Elevation: 4,260 m (13,980 ft)
- Coordinates: 17°21′46″S 66°35′25″W

Geography
- Location: Bolivia, Cochabamba Department
- Parent range: Andes

Wila Quta (Aymara for the skin of an animal, "red lake", also spelled Wila Kkota) is a mountain in the Bolivian Andes which reaches a height of approximately 4,260 m (13,980 ft). It is located in the Cochabamba Department, Ayopaya Province, Ayopaya Municipality. Wila Quta lies north of the Wila Quta River (Huilakhota, Wila Kkota), northeast of Lip'ichi.
