= Ch'uñu Pata =

Mountain in Bolivia

- Location within Bolivia

Highest point
- Elevation: 4,560 m (14,960 ft)
- Coordinates: 16°53′00″S 66°31′45″W

Geography
- Location: Bolivia, Cochabamba Department
- Parent range: Andes

Ch'uñu Pata (Aymara and Quechua ch'uñu a dried, frozen potato, pata stone bench, step, bank of a river, "ch'uñu step (or bank)", also spelled Chuño Pata) is a mountain in the Bolivian Andes which reaches a height of approximately 4,560 m (14,960 ft). It is located in the Cochabamba Department, Ayopaya Province, Cocapata Municipality. Ch'uñu Pata lies east of the Sinturani Lake.
