= Qiñwani Punta =

Mountain in Bolivia

- Location within Bolivia

Highest point
- Elevation: 4,560 m (14,960 ft)
- Coordinates: 17°02′32″S 66°25′37″W

Geography
- Location: Bolivia, Cochabamba Department
- Parent range: Andes

Qiñwani Punta (Aymara qiñwa, qiwña a kind of tree (polylepis), -ni a suffix, qiñwani "the one with the qiwña tree", also spelled Kheñwani Punta) is a mountain in the Bolivian Andes which reaches a height of approximately 4,560 m (14,960 ft). It is located in the Cochabamba Department, Ayopaya Province, Morochata Municipality.
