= Ch'illiwani =

Mountain in Bolivia

- Location within Bolivia

Highest point
- Elevation: 3,960 m (12,990 ft)
- Coordinates: 17°24′06″S 66°36′55″W

Geography
- Location: Bolivia, Cochabamba Department
- Parent range: Andes

Ch'illiwani (Aymara ch'illiwa a species of grass (Festuca dolichophylla), -ni a suffix, "the one with the ch'illiwa grass", also spelled Chillihuani) is a mountain in the Bolivian Andes which reaches a height of approximately 3,960 m (12,990 ft). It is located in the Cochabamba Department, Ayopaya Province, Ayopaya Municipality. Ch'illiwani lies southwest of Kuntur Chukuña.
