= Q'illu Suchusqa =

Mountain in Bolivia

- Location within Bolivia

Highest point
- Elevation: 4,480 m (14,700 ft)
- Coordinates: 17°11′29″S 66°19′30″W

Geography
- Location: Bolivia, Cochabamba Department
- Parent range: Andes

Q'illu Suchusqa (Quechua q'illu yellow, suchuy slide, -sqa a suffix, "slidden yellow", also spelled Khellu Suchuskha) is a mountain in the Bolivian Andes which reaches a height of approximately 4,480 m (14,700 ft). It is located in the Cochabamba Department, Quillacollo Province, Quillacollo Municipality. Q'illu Suchusqa lies southwest of Wila Qullu Punta.
