= Ayopaya Municipality =

Coordinates: 16.75°S 66.9167°W

- Municipality
- Interactive map of Ayopaya Municipality
- Country: Bolivia
- Department: Cochabamba Department
- Province: Ayopaya Province
- Seat: Ayopaya

Population (2001)
  - Total: 26,825
- Time zone: UTC-4 (BOT)

Ayopaya Municipality is the first municipal section of the Ayopaya Province in the Cochabamba Department, Bolivia. Its seat is Ayopaya.

== See also ==
- Ch'illiwani
- Lip'ichi
- Wila Qullu
- Wila Quta
