= Pirwata =

Mountain in Bolivia

- Location within Bolivia

Highest point
- Elevation: 5,060 m (16,600 ft)
- Coordinates: 17°12′51″S 66°23′59″W

Geography
- Location: Bolivia, Cochabamba Department
- Parent range: Andes

Pirwata (Aymara and Quechua pirwa granary, deposit, -ta a suffix, also spelled Pirhuata) is a 5,060-metre-high (16,600 ft) mountain in the Bolivian Andes. It is located in the Cochabamba Department, on the border of the Ayopaya Province, Morochata Municipality, and the Quillacollo Province, Quillacollo Municipality.
