= Hospitals of Hope =

Christian medical missions organization

Hospitals of Hope is a 501(c)(3) Christian medical missions organization that aims to improve the healthcare of the under-served, both locally and internationally.

Hospitals of Hope sends medical, dental, and general volunteers, as well as students at various levels in their training, to serve at the Hospitals of Hope hospital in Vinto, Bolivia and in other countries, such as Liberia and Haiti.

== History ==
Hospitals of Hope was founded by Michael Wawrzewski, after he took a number of mission trips overseas where he saw that many around the world lack basic medical care and died from preventable or treatable diseases.

In 1998, Michael and others started Hospitals of Hope in Wichita, Kansas.

Originally, the organization focused solely on Bolivia, beginning with a small, free clinic and expanding to a 32-bed hospital.

Hospitals of Hope’s work expanded to Haiti in 2004 with the development of the Clinic In A Can — a self-contained clinic built in a shipping container. Since January 2010's earthquake, Hospitals of Hope has sent six more Clinics in a Can to Haiti and three to Southern Sudan.

In 2008, Hospitals of Hope began work in Liberia, West Africa, partnering with John F. Kennedy Medical Center in Monrovia. Since 2008, Hospitals of Home has sent over $1.1 million of medical equipment and supplies to Liberia and has developed a partnership with ELWA (Eternal Love Winning Africa) Hospital, where they send volunteers year-round.

In March 2013, Hospitals of Hope sent a radiology Clinic in a Can to Sierra Leone.

== Clinic In A Can ==
Clinic in a can.

A Clinic In A Can is a self-contained medical clinic built in a shipping container. These clinics are built in the US and shipped around the world, providing an important resource for medical relief in the face of disaster or in areas with poor infrastructure.

The typical Clinic In A Can consists of two exam rooms, a laboratory, and a mechanical room with a generator and water system. Clinics can be modified to contain a dental room, a radiology suite, or a surgical suite.

The first Clinic in a Can was sent to Louisiana after Hurricane Katrina in 2005.

Hospitals of Hope has constructed ten Clinic In A Cans total. Seven clinics for use in Haiti and three will be sent to Southern Sudan. The most recent projects were actually making two small hospitals, made of three shipping containers each, for use in Haiti and Southern Sudan.

== Bolivia ==
Hospitals of Hope in Bolivia.

After its founding in 1998, Hospitals of Hope began work in and around Cochabamba, Bolivia. In those early years, their efforts were directed at providing medical care in a small clinic in Vinto, Bolivia.

Hospitals of Hope broke ground for its new hospital in Vinto, Bolivia in January 2003. The Bolivian hospital is currently the primary site where volunteers are sent, both medical and non-medical. Hospitals of Hope has sent over 1700 volunteers on short-term missions to Bolivia, who assist the staff in caring for patients, as well as doing construction and community outreach.

== Haiti ==
Hospitals of Hope in Haiti.

Les Cayes, Haiti is the home of the original Clinic In A Can—a self-contained medical/dental clinic built in the back of a 48’ semi-trailer donated to Hospitals of Hope by the Love Box Company.

Hospitals of Hope built more Clinics in a Can in response to Haiti's January 2010 earthquake. The idea for a Clinic In A Can was born after hearing a story from a Kenyan man whose sister had died on the way to the hospital during her first pregnancy. She had come home to have her first baby, as is customary in Kenya. While home, she began running a fever, and the family decided to take her to the nearest hospital, which was ten miles away. Taking their only method of transportation, the family took turns pushing and pulling their ailing relative in a wheelbarrow. Somewhere between her village and the hospital, she died.

This story inspired Hospitals of Hope’s founder, Michael Wawrzewski, to find a solution, and the solution that he found was the Clinic In A Can — a clinic that could be built in Wichita and then shipped anywhere in the world. Hospitals of Hope partnered with Jean Eustache, a Wichita nurse born and raised in Haiti, to send the Clinic In A Can to Les Cayes. Two of Hospitals of Hope’s long-time supporters, Kyle Stevens and Myron Smith, headed up this daunting task and, after two years of design and one year of construction, the first Clinic In A Can was completed. Since then, Hospitals of Hope has built several more Clinics in a Can, which contain exam rooms, a laboratory, a generator, and a water system, making them fully self-contained.

== Liberia ==
Hospitals of Hope founder Mike Wawrzewski in Liberia.

Hospitals of Hope is committed to helping bring change in Liberia, through sending essential equipment, training hospital staff, and providing patient care.

In its first two years of working in Liberia, Hospitals of Hope primarily focused on JFK Medical Center in Monrovia, Liberia, the main government hospital in this country of 3.5 million people. When Hospitals of Hope began work there, JFK was in need of basic equipment, but Hospitals of Hope has donated $1.1 million of medical equipment to JFK, greatly increasing its capacity to effectively treat patients.

Since then, Hospitals of Hope has shifted its focus to ELWA (Eternal Love Winning Africa), a well-respected and established ministry, which has been at work in Liberia since the 1950s and began as a ministry of SIM (then Sudan Interior Mission). Although ELWA offers quality care and has great plans for the future, the hospital is in dire need. With only 1 doctor for every 28,000 people in Liberia, ELWA is swamped with patients, and their limited resources are stretched thin. Hospitals of Hope is partnering with ELWA to help meet these needs. In the summers of 2010 and 2011, Hospitals of Hope sent volunteer teams to work at ELWA. In early 2011, Hospitals of Hope partnered with the Brother's Brother Foundation to send necessary equipment to the hospital. Hospitals of Hope is also helping ELWA make plans to expand the existing hospital. The current ELWA Hospital was built in 1965 and is too small and out-of-date to meet the needs of the community.
