= Pukara Mayu =

- Etymology: Quechua

Location
- Country: Bolivia
- Region: Cochabamba Department

Physical characteristics
- Mouth: Mayllanku River (Rocha River)

Pukara Mayu (Aymara and Quechua pukara fortress or mountain of protection, mayu river, Hispanicized spelling Pucara Mayu) is a Bolivian river in the Cochabamba Department, Chapare Province, Sacaba Municipality. It is a left affluent of Mayllanku River (Maylanco) which receives the name Rocha River when it enters the Cochabamba Municipality.

== See also ==
- List of rivers of Bolivia
