= Colcapirhua =

Colcapirhua Qullqapirwa
- Town
- Location within Bolivia
- Coordinates: 17°25′00″S 66°15′00″W
- Country: Bolivia
- Department: Cochabamba Department
- Province: Quillacollo Province
- Municipality: Colcapirhua Municipality

Government
  - Mayor: Mario Severich Bustamante
- Elevation: 2,565 m (8,415 ft)

Population (2012)
  - Total: 48,631
- Time zone: UTC-4 (BOT)

Colcapirhua (Hispanicized spelling of native Quechua: Qullqapirwa, a place where things are stored) is a town in the Cochabamba Department in central Bolivia. It is the seat of the Colcapirhua Municipality, the fifth municipal section of the Quillacollo Province.

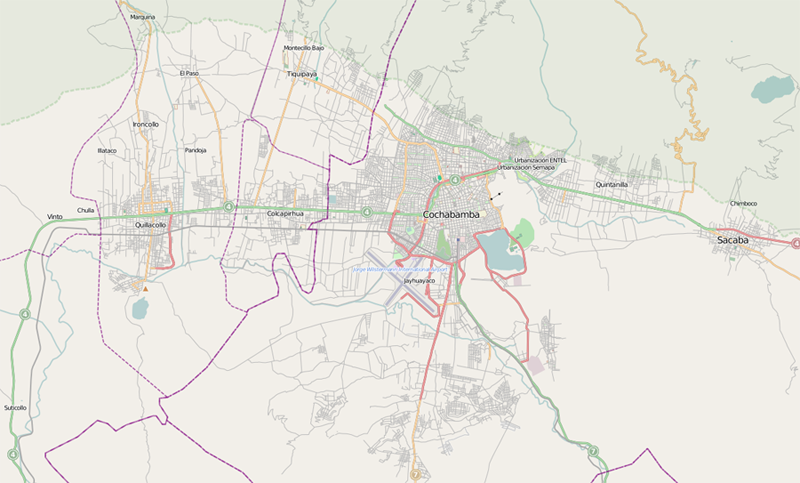
Map showing the location of Colcapirhua

== Geography ==
=== Location ===
Colcapirhua is the province of Quillacollo Cochabamba department. Bordered on the east by the province of Cercado, west to the town of Quillacollo and north with the municipality of Tiquipaya

== History ==
Colcapirhua was founded as a municipality on 15 April 1985. It was a 27 year process which was heavily opposed by the adjacent municipality of Quillacollo. It is the youngest municipality in the province of Quillacollo, the municipality was created because of the neglect and apathy of the municipal authorities of Quillacollo, who did not attend the needs of the inhabitants of this region. In ancient times the local inhabitants were characterized by the production of jars, pots and vases made of mud and clay, so that its inhabitants, pottery experts are called in Quechua "Mank'a llutas" (makers of pots). The process of creating the fifth section lasted 27 years by the fierce opposition of the Municipality of Quillacollo. It began on August 25, 1958 and culminated in the enactment of Law 579 of 15 April 1985, during the presidency of Hernán Siles Suazo. The standard was ratified by Act of March 18, 1987 in the government of Victor Paz Estenssoro. Thus the municipality but not with the territorial limits initially proposed was created.

The name derives from the Quechua Colcapirhua Qolque-money and pirwua-sky where corn was stored. The current mayor is Mario Severich Bustamante.

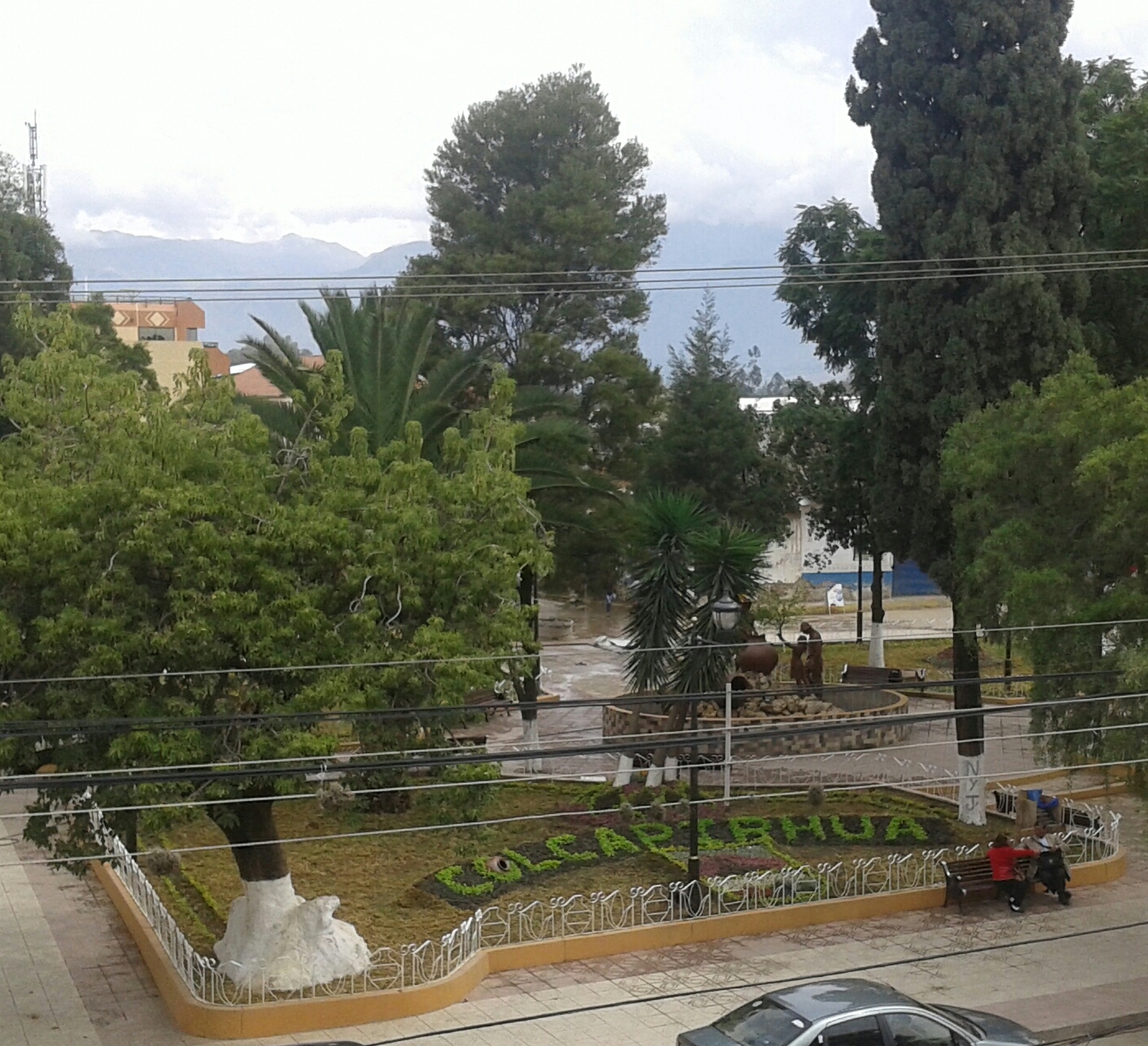
Square 15 de abril in Colcapirhua

== Tourism and culture ==
Colcapirhua hosts a variety of local food fairs to showcase the agricultural production of the region. The Jak'a Lawa (a local soup ) and corn fair was recognized as local culinary patrimony. It takes place every second week of February in the Plaza 15 of April. The craft and plant fair takes place the month of October and showcases local plant and craft production. The miniature food fair showcases traditional dishes made in miniature. It takes place in the month of April.
