= Vinto Municipality =

Vinto Wint'u
- Municipality
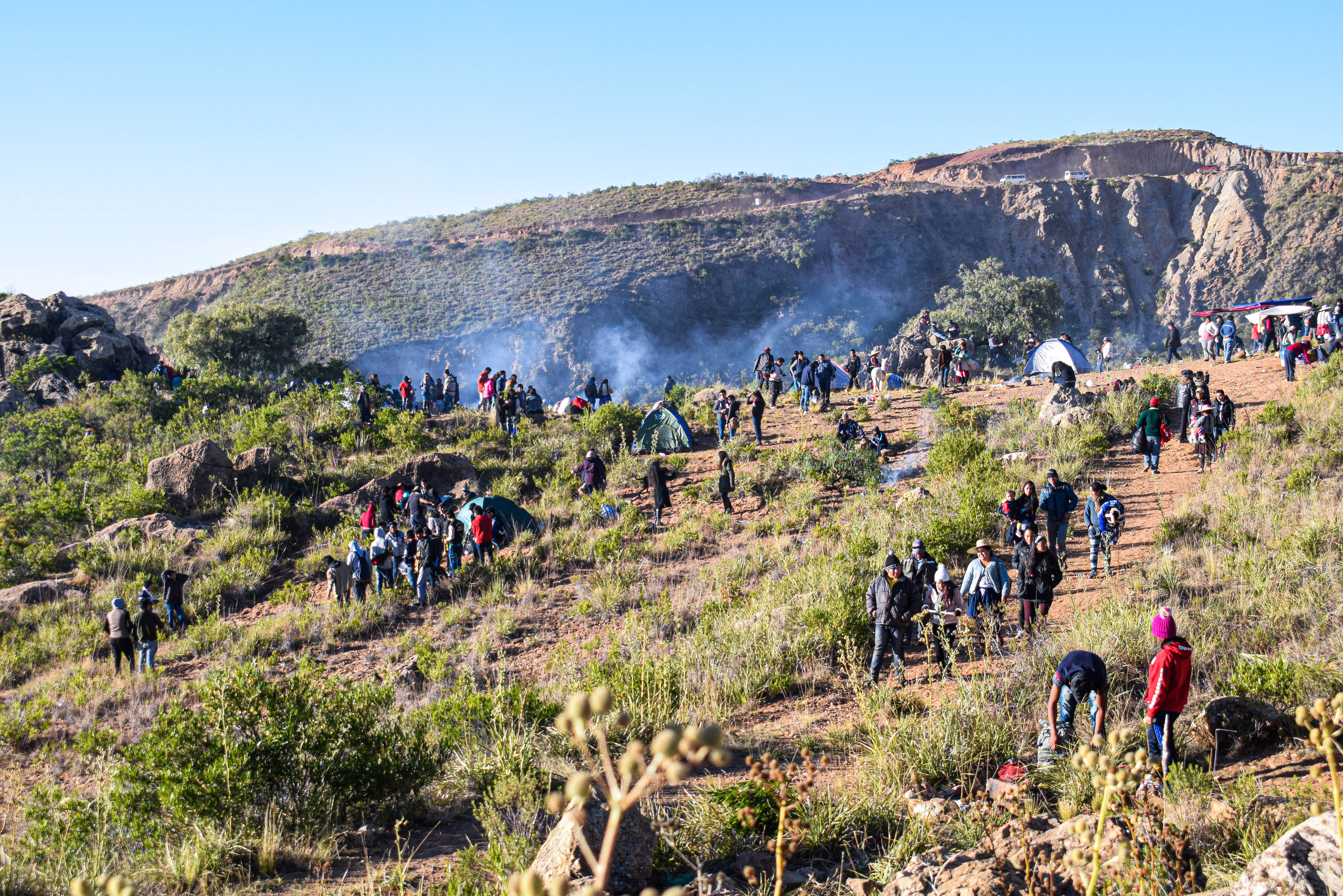
- The people of Vinto celebrate Willkakuti in 2018

- Location within Bolivia
- Coordinates: 17°22′S 66°22′W
- Country: Bolivia
- Department: Cochabamba
- Province: Quillacollo
- Seat: Vinto

Government
  - Mayor: Pacifico Otalora Encinas (2007)
  - President: Carlos García Canedo (2007)

Population (2001)
  - Total: 31,489
- Time zone: UTC-4 (BOT)

Vinto Municipality is the fourth municipal section of the Quillacollo Province in the Cochabamba Department, Bolivia. Its seat is Vinto.

== Geography ==
Some of the highest mountains of the municipality are listed below:

- Anti Pata
- Chawpi Apachita
- Jukumarini
- Panti Pata
- Pichaqani
- P'ukru P'unqu
- Phullu Punchu
- Qiñwani
- Wanaku
- Wathiyani
- Wayna Tunari
- Yana Qaqa
- Yapu Sayana

== Cantons ==
The municipality is divided into four cantons. They are (their seats in parentheses):

- Anocaraire Canton - (Anocaraire)
- La Chulla Canton - (La Chulla)
- Machac Marca Canton - (Machac Marca)
- Vinto Canton - (Vinto)
