= Salla Willk'i Punta =

Mountain in Bolivia

- Location within Bolivia

Highest point
- Elevation: 4,560 m (14,960 ft)
- Coordinates: 17°02′56″S 66°28′47″W

Geography
- Location: Bolivia, Cochabamba Department
- Parent range: Andes

Salla Willk'i Punta (Aymara salla rocks, cliffs, willk'i gap, also spelled Salla Willkhi Punta) is a mountain in the Bolivian Andes which reaches a height of approximately 4,560 m (14,960 ft). It is located in the Cochabamba Department, Ayopaya Province, Morochata Municipality. It lies north of the lakes named Q'umir Qucha ("green lake", Khomer Khocha), Yana Qucha ("black lake", Yana Khocha), Parinani ("the one with flamingos") and Wallatani ("the one with Andean geese", Huallatani).
