= Mi Tren =

Light Rail serving Cochabamba, Bolivia

Metropolitan Train of Cochabamba
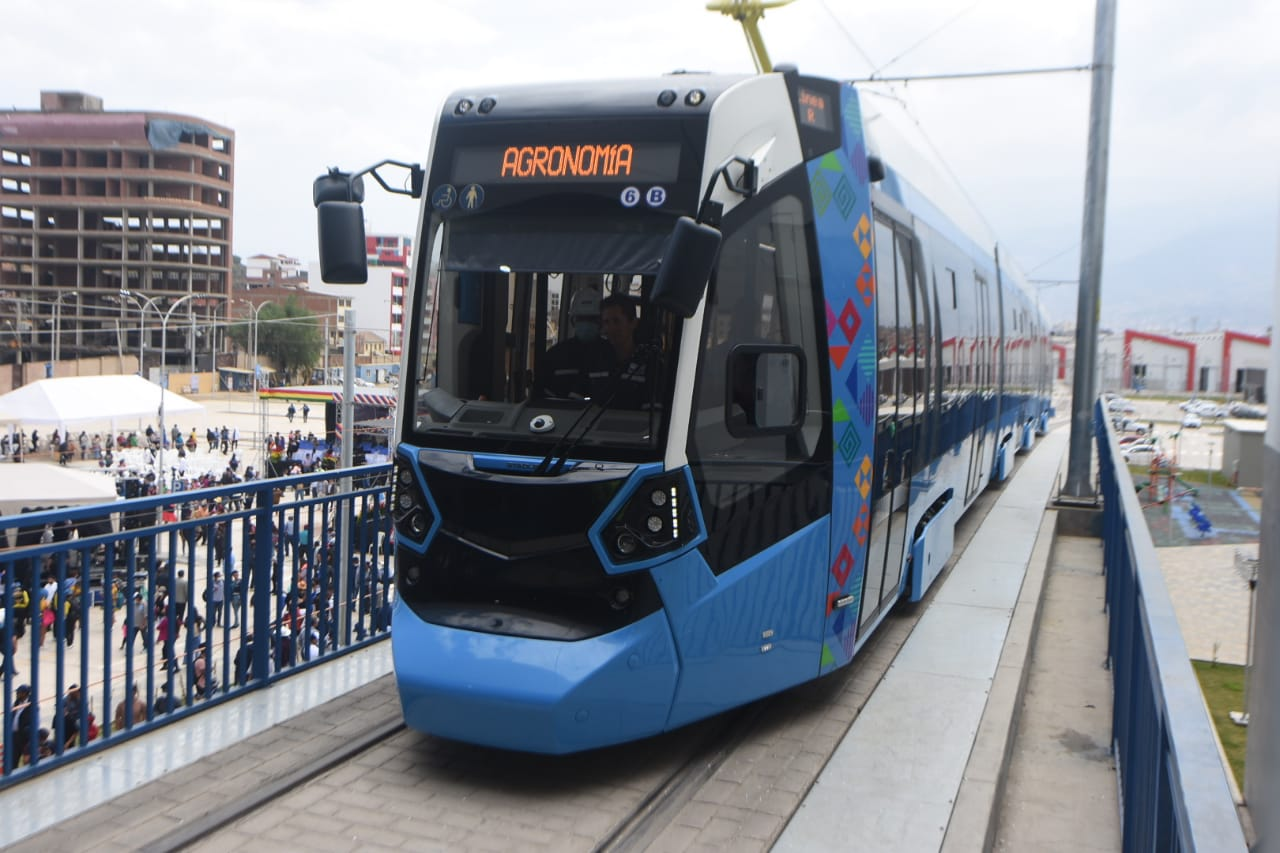

Overview
- Native name: Tren Metropolitano de Cochabamba
- Owner: Ministry of Public Works, Services, and Housing
- Area served: Kanata metropolitan area
- Locale: Cochabamba, Bolivia
- Transit type: Light Rail/Interurban
- Number of lines: 3
- Line number: Red, Yellow, Green
- Number of stations: 36
- Headquarters: Cochabamba

Operation
- Began operation: 13 September 2022
- Operator: Operadora del Tren Metropolitano de Cochabamba - Mi Tren
- Character: At-grade street running
- Rolling stock: Stadler Metelitsa - B85601M
- Number of vehicles: 12 trams

Technical
- System length: 42 km (26.1 mi)
- Track gauge: 1,435 mm (4 ft 8 1/2 in) standard gauge
- Electrification: 750 V DC overhead lines

Mi Tren is a light rail network operating in the Bolivian city of Cochabamba, linking the city with Suticollo, El Castillo and San Simon University. The system opened on 13 September 2022, with service beginning on the Red Line and the first phase of the Green Line.

== Background ==
Construction began on the $504 million project in 2017 and it was aimed to be finished in 2020. However, construction work was halted in late 2019 with reports of delayed payments between project promoters and key contractors. As of December 2020, new funding from the state has allowed construction to restart. The first phase of the system comprising the Red Line between Estación Central and UMSS and the Green Line between Estación Central and Quillacollo finally opened on September 13, 2022.

Extensions to both lines opened one year later, on 14 September 2023: A new section of the Red Line between Estación Central and Estación Cochabamba, and a new section of the Green Line between Quillacollo and Estación Municipal Vinto. The remainder of the Green Line is still under construction, while local opposition delayed the Yellow Line until its opening on 17 September 2025.

== Lines ==
Lines
Line	Color	Route	Length	Travel time	Number of stations
Line 1	Red	Estación Cochabamba-Estación Central San Antonio-Parada Kiñiloma	7,5 km	25 minutes	9
Line 2	Green	Estación Cochabamba-Estación Central San Antonio-Parada Aeropuerto-Estación Municipal Colcapirhua-Estación Municipal Quillacollo-Estación Municipal Vinto-Estación Municipal Suticollo	27,37 km	53 minutes	23
Line 3	Yellow	Estación Cochabamba-Estación Central San Antonio-Parada Aeropuerto-Parada Jorge Wilstermann-Parada Terrapuerto	5,8 km	20 minutes	5

== Rolling stock ==
Stadler was contracted to supply 12 vehicles LRV Metelitsa B85601M for the network, with delivery expected in August 2019, and Stadler is to provide three years' warranty. Metelitsa model provided are the three-section vehicles having capacity for 200 passengers and a maximum speed of 80 km/h. The trams are 33 m long, 2.5 m wide and 3.6 m high (excluding pantograph).
