= Kimsa Tinkuy =

Mountain in Bolivia

- Location within Bolivia

Highest point
- Elevation: 4,720 m (15,490 ft)
- Coordinates: 17°13′14″S 66°18′07″W

Geography
- Location: Bolivia, Cochabamba Department
- Parent range: Andes

Kimsa Tinkuy (Quechua kimsa three, to meet, meeting, (also related to the confluence of rivers) "three meetings", also spelled Quimsa Tincuy, Quimsa Ticuy) is a mountain in the Bolivian Andes which reaches a height of approximately 4,720 m (15,490 ft). It is located in the Cochabamba Department, Quillacollo Province, Quillacollo Municipality. Kimsa Tinkuy lies northwest to west of Awila Wachana Punta and southeast of Quna Quna Q'asa.
