= Ch'aki Mayu (Cochabamba) =

- Etymology: Quechua

Location
- Country: Bolivia
- Region: Cochabamba Department; Quillacollo Province

Physical characteristics
- Mouth: Rocha River

Ch'aki Mayu (Quechua ch'aki dry, mayu river, "dry river", Hispanicized spelling Chaqui Mayu) is a Bolivian river in the Cochabamba Department, Quillacollo Province, Sipe Sipe Municipality. It is a right affluent of the Rocha River which belongs to the Amazon river basin. Ch'aki Mayu flows in a large bow from the west to the east around Sipe Sipe. The confluence with the Rocha River is south east of the town.

== See also ==
- List of rivers of Bolivia
