= Cocapata =

- Location of Cocapata within Bolivia
- Coordinates: 16°44′0″S 66°36′0″W
- Country: Bolivia
- Department: Cochabamba Department
- Province: Ayopaya Province
- Municipality: Cocapata Municipality
- Canton: Cocapata Canton
- Elevation: 11,800 ft (3,600 m)

Population (2012)
  - Total: 401
- Time zone: UTC-4 (BOT)

Cocapata is a locality in the Cochabamba Department in central Bolivia. It is the seat of the Cocapata Municipality, the third municipal section of the Ayopaya Province. At the time of 2012 census, it had a population of 401.
