= P'utu P'utu =

Mountain in Bolivia

- Location within Bolivia

Highest point
- Elevation: 4,880 m (16,010 ft)
- Coordinates: 17°08′42″S 66°23′54″W

Geography
- Location: Bolivia, Cochabamba Department
- Parent range: Andes

P'utu P'utu (aymara p'utu p'utu full of holes, also spelled Potopoto) is a mountain in the Bolivian Andes which reaches a height of approximately 4,880 m (16,010 ft). It is located in the Cochabamba Department, Quillacollo Province, Quillacollo Municipality. P'utu P'utu lies west of Jatun Kimray Punta.
