= Tiquipaya Municipality =

- Municipality
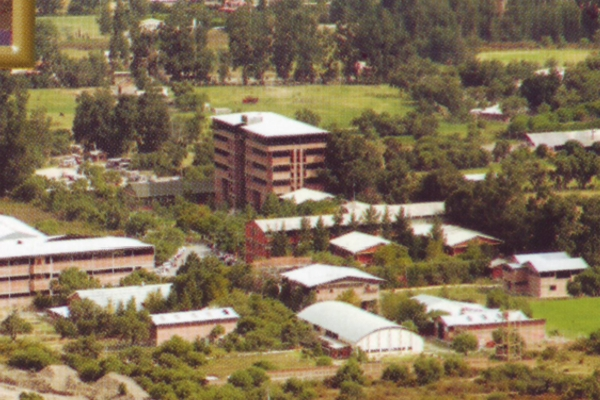
- Universidad del Valle, Tiquipaya

- Location within Bolivia
- Coordinates: 17°12′S 66°13′W
- Country: Bolivia
- Department: Cochabamba Department
- Province: Quillacollo Province
- Seat: Tiquipaya

Government
  - Mayor: Antonio Rios Quintaya (2007)
  - President: Armando Iporre Reynolds (2007)

Population (2012)
  - Total: 53,904
  - Ethnicities: Quechuas
- Time zone: UTC-4 (BOT)

Tiquipaya Municipality is the third municipal section of the Quillacollo Province in the Cochabamba Department, Bolivia. Its seat is Tiquipaya.

Known as the "City of Flowers", the city is home to many dairy farmers and is known to be a highly visited and productive area, with a climatic diversity attributed to its valleys, plateaus and subtropical regions.

== Cantons ==
The municipality consists of only one canton, Tiquipaya Canton. It is identical to the municipality.

== See also ==
- Sayt'u Qucha
