= Pukarani (Cochabamba) =

Mountain in Bolivia

- Location within Bolivia

Highest point
- Elevation: 4,164 m (13,661 ft)
- Coordinates: 17°03′02″S 66°38′43″W

Geography
- Location: Bolivia, Cochabamba Department
- Parent range: Andes

Pukarani (Aymara pukara fortress, -ni a suffix, "the one with a fortress", also spelled Pucarani) is a 4,164-metre-high (13,661 ft) mountain in the Bolivian Andes. It is located in the Cochabamba Department, Ayopaya Province, Morochata Municipality. It lies northeast of the village of Pukarani (Pucarani).
