= Turi Turini (Cochabamba) =

Mountain in Bolivia

- Location within Bolivia

Highest point
- Elevation: 4,640 m (15,220 ft)
- Coordinates: 16°58′28″S 66°38′03″W

Geography
- Location: Bolivia, Cochabamba Department
- Parent range: Andes

Turi Turini (Aymara turi tower, the reduplication indicates that there is a group of something, -ni a suffix to indicate ownership, "the one with a group of towers", also spelled Tori Torini) is a mountain in the Bolivian Andes which reaches a height of approximately 4,640 m (15,220 ft). It is located in the Cochabamba Department, Ayopaya Province, Morochata Municipality, southwest of the village of Chorito.
