= Yana Qaqa (Cochabamba) =

Mountain in Bolivia

- Location within Bolivia

Highest point
- Elevation: 4,260 m (13,980 ft)
- Coordinates: 17°20′56″S 66°25′24″W

Geography
- Location: Bolivia, Cochabamba Department
- Parent range: Andes

Yana Qaqa (Quechua yana black, qaqa rock, "black rock", also spelled Yana Khakha) is a mountain in the Bolivian Andes which reaches a height of approximately 4,260 m (13,980 ft). It is located in the Cochabamba Department, Quillacollo Province, Vinto Municipality. Yana Qaqa lies southeast of Qiñwani.
