= Jatun Kimray Punta =

Mountain in Bolivia

- Location within Bolivia

Highest point
- Elevation: 4,560 m (14,960 ft)
- Coordinates: 17°08′32″S 66°21′35″W

Geography
- Location: Bolivia, Cochabamba Department
- Parent range: Andes

Jatun Kimray Punta (Quechua jatun big, kimray, kinray slope, also spelled Jatun Quinray Punta) is a mountain in the Bolivian Andes which reaches a height of approximately 4,560 m (14,960 ft). It is located in the Cochabamba Department, Quillacollo Province, Quillacollo Municipality. Jatun Kimray Punta lies east of P'utu P'utu.
