= Vinto =

Vinto Wint'u
- Town
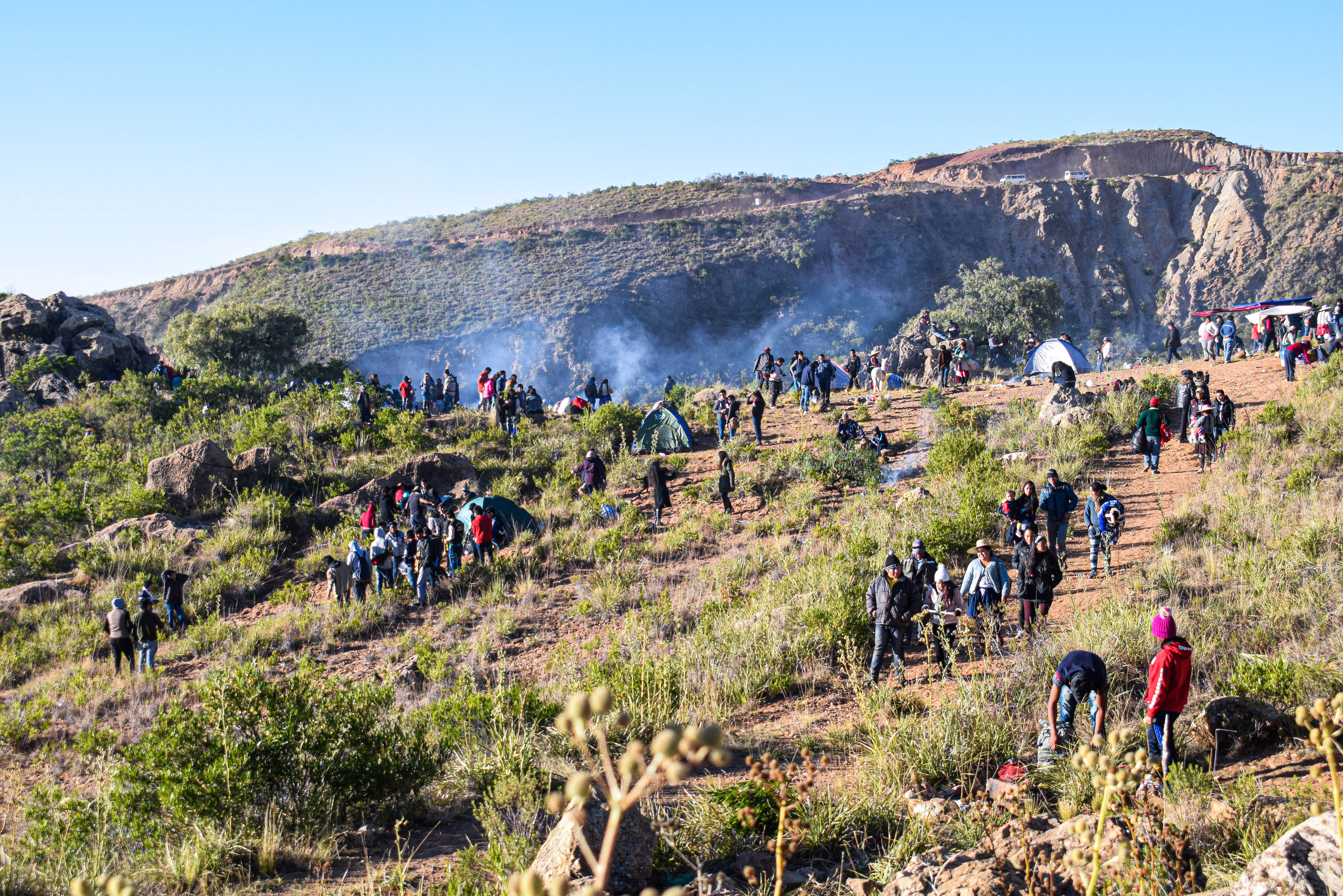
- The people of Vinto celebrate Willkakuti in 2018

- Location within Bolivia
- Coordinates: 17°23′00″S 66°18′00″W
- Country: Bolivia
- Department: Cochabamba Department
- Province: Quillacollo Province
- Municipality: Vinto Municipality
- Elevation: 8,376 ft (2,553 m)

Population (2012)
  - Total: 51,968
- Time zone: UTC-4 (BOT)

Vinto is a town in the Cochabamba Department in central Bolivia. It is the seat of the Vinto Municipality, the fourth municipal section of the Quillacollo Province.

== Population ==
From 1976, the population of Vinto increased as follows:

Year	Inhabitant	Reference
1976	4 419	
1992	9 493	
2001	14 180	
2012	51 968	

== Medical Care ==
Hospitals of Hope is located in Vinto and provides low-cost, quality health care to the surrounding area.
