= Inka Laqaya (Cochabamba) =

Mountain in Bolivia

- Location within Bolivia

Highest point
- Elevation: 3,280 m (10,760 ft)
- Coordinates: 17°29′02″S 66°23′15″W

Geography
- Location: Bolivia, Cochabamba Department
- Parent range: Andes

Inka Laqaya (Aymara Inka Inca, laqaya ruins of a building, also spelled Inca Racaya, Inca Lacaya) is a mountain in the Bolivian Andes which reaches a height of approximately 3,280 m (10,760 ft). It is located in the Cochabamba Department, Quillacollo Province, Sipe Sipe Municipality, southwest of Sipe Sipe.
