= Q'ara Apachita (Quillacollo) =

Mountain in Bolivia

- Location within Bolivia

Highest point
- Elevation: 4,046 m (13,274 ft)
- Coordinates: 17°24′08″S 66°27′06″W

Geography
- Location: Bolivia, Cochabamba Department
- Parent range: Andes

Q'ara Apachita (Aymara q'ara bare, bald, apachita the place of transit of an important pass in the principal routes of the Andes; name in the Andes for a stone cairn, a little pile of rocks built along the trail in the high mountains, "bare apachita", also spelled Khara Apacheta) is a 4,046-metre-high (13,274 ft) mountain in the Bolivian Andes. It is located in the Cochabamba Department, Quillacollo Province, Sipe Sipe Municipality.
