= Sipe Sipe Municipality =

- Municipality

- Location of the Sipe Sipe Municipality within Bolivia
- Coordinates: 17°29′0″S 66°21′0″W
- Country: Bolivia
- Department: Cochabamba Department
- Province: Quillacollo Province
- Seat: Sipe Sipe

Government
  - Mayor: Valerio Cartagena Escobar (2007)
  - President: Felicidad Guzmán Argote (2007)

Population (2001)
  - Total: 31,337
- Time zone: UTC-4 (BOT)

Sipe Sipe Municipality is the second municipal section of the Quillacollo Province in the Cochabamba Department, Bolivia. Its seat is Sipe Sipe. At the time of census 2001 the municipality had 31,337 inhabitants.

== Geography ==
Some of the highest mountains of the municipality are listed below:

- Allqamari
- Asir Qullu
- Atuq Wachana
- Ch'uñawi
- Inka Laqaya
- Jalsuri
- Mamani Punta
- Nasa Q'ara
- Pichaqani
- Puka Waka
- P'ukru Urqu
- Qiñwa Q'asa
- Qiñwani
- Q'ara Apachita
- Rumi Q'asa
- Tikrasqa
- Turi Rumi
- Wila Wila
- Wisk'achani
- Yarita Punta
- Yuraq Q'asa
- Yuraq Yaku

== Subdivision ==
Sipe Sipe Municipality is divided into three cantons.

Kanton	Inhabitants (2001)	Seat	Inhabitants (2001)
Sipe Sipe Canton	16,554	Sipe Sipe	3,134
Itapaya Canton	6,496	Itapaya	700
Mallco Rancho Canton	8,287	Mallco Rancho	1,171

== See also ==
- Ch'aki Mayu
- Inka Raqay
