= Lip'ichi =

Mountain in Bolivia

- Location within Bolivia

Highest point
- Elevation: 4,180 m (13,710 ft)
- Coordinates: 17°21′52″S 66°36′05″W

Geography
- Location: Bolivia, Cochabamba Department
- Parent range: Andes

Lip'ichi (Aymara for the skin of an animal, also spelled Liphichii) is a mountain in the Bolivian Andes which reaches a height of approximately 4,180 m (13,710 ft). It is located in the Cochabamba Department, Ayopaya Province, Ayopaya Municipality. Lip'ichi lies north of the Wila Quta River, southwest of Wila Quta.
