= Sayt'u Qucha (Tiquipaya) =

- Location within Cochabamba Location within Bolivia Location within South America
- Interactive map of Sayt'u Qucha
- Location: Cochabamba Department, Quillacollo Province, Tiquipaya Municipality
- Coordinates: 17°12′55″S 66°11′40″W
- Basin countries: Bolivia
- Surface elevation: 4,305 m (14,124 ft)

Sayt'u Qucha (Quechua sayt'u long and narrow, rectangular, qucha lake, "long and narrow lake", Hispanicized spellings Sayto Khocha, Saytu Khocha, Saytu Kocha) is a Bolivian lake located in the Cochabamba Department, Quillacollo Province, Tiquipaya Municipality, situated about 4,305 m high.
