= Tikrasqa =

Mountain in Bolivia

- Location within Bolivia

Highest point
- Elevation: 4,480 m (14,700 ft)
- Coordinates: 17°24′26″S 66°28′53″W

Geography
- Location: Bolivia, Cochabamba Department
- Parent range: Andes

Tikrasqa (Quechua tikray to turn upside down, -sqa a suffix, "turned upside down", also spelled Tijraskha) is a mountain in the Bolivian Andes which reaches a height of approximately 4,480 m (14,700 ft). It is located in the Cochabamba Department, Quillacollo Province, Sipe Sipe Municipality.
