= Uqi Salli Punta =

Mountain in Bolivia

- Location within Bolivia

Highest point
- Elevation: 4,840 m (15,880 ft)
- Coordinates: 17°02′43″S 66°18′10″W

Geography
- Location: Bolivia, Cochabamba Department, Chapare Province
- Parent range: Andes

Uqi Salli Punta (Quechua uqi lead, salli sulfur, also spelled Okhe Salli Punta) is a 4,840-metre-high (15,880 ft) mountain in the Bolivian Andes. It is located in the Cochabamba Department, on the border of the Chapare Province, Villa Tunari Municipality, and the Quillacollo Province, Quillacollo Municipality.
