= Morochata =

Coordinates: 17°14′04″S 66°31′56″W

Morochata Muruchata
- Village
- Interactive map of Morochata
- Country: Bolivia
- Department: Cochabamba Department
- Province: Ayopaya Province
- Municipality: Morochata Municipality
- Canton: Morochata Canton

Government
  - Mayor: Roman Choquevillca Baptista (2007)
  - President: Francisco Otalora Ticona (2007)

Population (2001)
  - Total: 504
- Time zone: UTC-4 (BOT)

Morochata, Muruchata is a location in the Cochabamba Department in central Bolivia. It is the seat of the Morochata Municipality, the second municipal section of the Ayopaya Province.
