= Yuraq Q'asa (Cochabamba) =

Mountain in Bolivia

- Location within Bolivia

Highest point
- Elevation: 3,980 m (13,060 ft)
- Coordinates: 17°27′29″S 66°28′49″W

Geography
- Location: Bolivia, Cochabamba Department
- Parent range: Andes

Yuraq Q'asa (Quechua yuraq white, q'asa mountain pass, "white mountain pass", also spelled Yuraj Khasa) is a mountain in the Bolivian Andes which reaches a height of approximately 3,980 m (13,060 ft). It is located in the Cochabamba Department, Quillacollo Province, Sipe Sipe Municipality.
