= Tiquipaya =

- Town
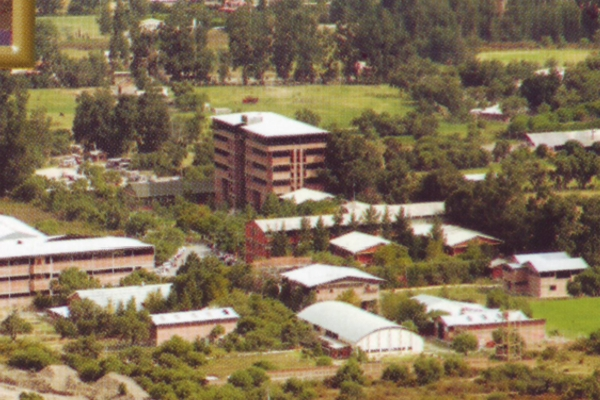

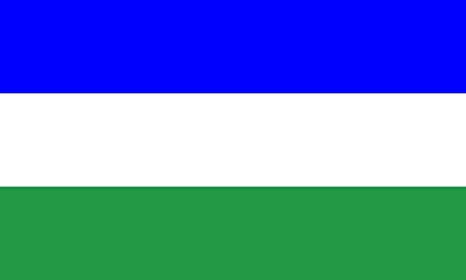
- Flag

- Location within Bolivia
- Coordinates: 17°20′00″S 66°13′00″W
- Country: Bolivia
- Department: Cochabamba Department
- Province: Quillacollo Province
- Municipality: Tiquipaya Municipality
- Elevation: 2,649 m (8,691 ft)

Population (2024)
  - Total: 58,223
- Time zone: UTC-4 (BOT)

Tiquipaya is a town in the Cochabamba Department in central Bolivia. It is the seat of the Tiquipaya Municipality, the third municipal section of the Quillacollo Province. It is known as the "city of flowers". The town hosts many dairy farmers and is known as a well visited and productive zone with surprising climatic diversity due to valleys, high plains, and sub-tropical regions. Prior to the Bolivian National Revolution of 1952, most of Tiquipaya was an estate or latifundio finca owned by the family of Petronila Zeballos Terrazas (1833–1918). Her brother Angel Maria Zeballos served as the bishop of Cochabamba. Her husband was Salvador Cabero Rollano (1825–1883), a medical doctor and one of the founders of the Hospital Viedma, the first general hospital in Cochabamba. Modern day descendants of Dr. Cabero include Fernando Gonzalez Sfeir and Mohammed Mostajo-Radji.

Today, the town is home to the Universidad del Valle (UNIVALLE) that helps in the economy of the region as a result of the services required. Around 2% of the population of Tiquipaya was born in a foreign country. Most of them are students from Brasil. In April 2010, Tiquipaya was the host city for the World People's Conference on Climate Change and the Rights of Mother Earth. In the fall of 2016, Malia Obama, daughter of United States president Barack Obama, lived with a host family in Tiquipaya while she pursued a cultural immersion program sponsored by the educational tourism company Where There Be Dragons.

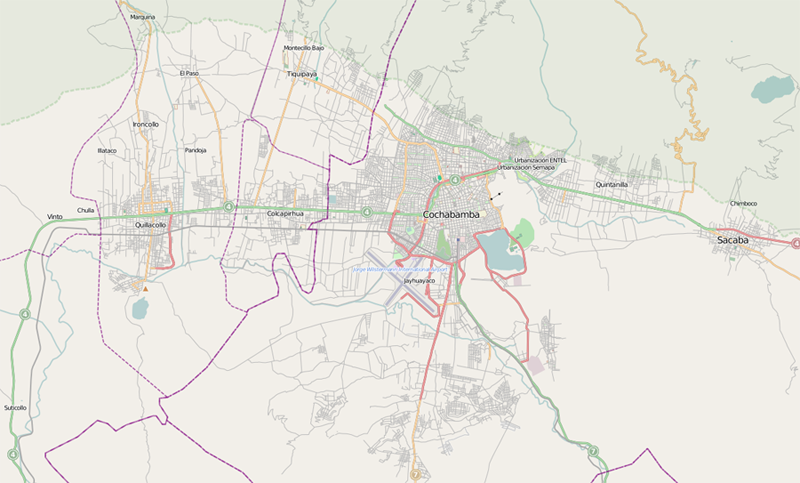
Map showing the location of Tiquipaya

== Climate ==
Climate data for Tiquipaya (La Violeta), elevation 2,614 m (8,576 ft), (1979–2013)
Month	Jan	Feb	Mar	Apr	May	Jun	Jul	Aug	Sep	Oct	Nov	Dec	Year
Record high °C (°F)	33.0 (91.4)	32.5 (90.5)	33.0 (91.4)	32.0 (89.6)	32.5 (90.5)	31.5 (88.7)	32.2 (90.0)	32.0 (89.6)	32.5 (90.5)	34.0 (93.2)	35.0 (95.0)	36.0 (96.8)	36.0 (96.8)
Mean daily maximum °C (°F)	25.0 (77.0)	24.9 (76.8)	25.4 (77.7)	26.1 (79.0)	26.4 (79.5)	25.6 (78.1)	25.4 (77.7)	26.3 (79.3)	26.4 (79.5)	27.0 (80.6)	27.1 (80.8)	26.3 (79.3)	26.0 (78.8)
Daily mean °C (°F)	18.3 (64.9)	18.0 (64.4)	17.8 (64.0)	16.7 (62.1)	14.7 (58.5)	13.3 (55.9)	13.3 (55.9)	14.8 (58.6)	16.2 (61.2)	17.9 (64.2)	18.8 (65.8)	18.9 (66.0)	16.6 (61.8)
Mean daily minimum °C (°F)	11.6 (52.9)	11.2 (52.2)	10.3 (50.5)	7.3 (45.1)	3.1 (37.6)	1.0 (33.8)	1.1 (34.0)	3.4 (38.1)	6.2 (43.2)	8.8 (47.8)	10.4 (50.7)	11.4 (52.5)	7.2 (44.9)
Record low °C (°F)	5.0 (41.0)	4.8 (40.6)	3.0 (37.4)	0.0 (32.0)	−3.6 (25.5)	−5.0 (23.0)	−6.0 (21.2)	−3.2 (26.2)	−1.2 (29.8)	1.0 (33.8)	3.0 (37.4)	3.8 (38.8)	−6.0 (21.2)
Average precipitation mm (inches)	134.3 (5.29)	101.1 (3.98)	77.8 (3.06)	23.1 (0.91)	3.4 (0.13)	3.3 (0.13)	2.0 (0.08)	4.1 (0.16)	8.2 (0.32)	24.3 (0.96)	52.5 (2.07)	103.8 (4.09)	537.9 (21.18)
Average precipitation days	16.4	13.4	11.4	3.8	0.9	0.8	0.6	1.4	2.7	4.7	8.3	12.9	77.3
Source: Servicio Nacional de Meteorología e Hidrología de Bolivia
