= Ayopaya Province =

Province of Bolivia

Coordinates: 16°45′S 66°55′W

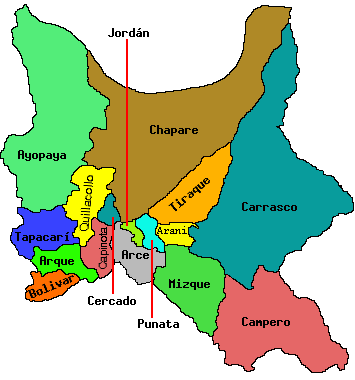
Location within the Cochabamba Department

Ayopaya is a province in the Cochabamba Department, Bolivia. Its capital is Ayopaya (or Independencia).

== Geography ==
Some of the highest mountains of the province are listed below:

- Ch'illiwani
- Ch'uñu Pata
- Inka Q'asa
- Jatun Apachita
- Jatun Yuraq Q'asa
- Jichu Apachita
- Lip'ichi
- Liqiliqini
- Llamayuq Q'asa
- Pirwata
- Pukarani
- P'iq'iñ Q'ara
- Qiñwani Punta
- Q'illu Mayu
- Q'illu Q'illu
- Salla Willk'i Punta
- Silla Q'asa
- Turi Turini
- Waka P'iqi
- Wila Qullu
- Wila Quta
- Wisk'achani

== Subdivision ==
Ayopaya Province is divided into three municipalities which are further subdivided into cantons.

Section	Municipality	Seat
1st	Ayopaya Municipality	Ayopaya
2nd	Morochata Municipality	Morochata
3rd	Cocapata Municipality	Cocapata

Cocapata Municipality (formerly Cocapata Canton) was created on February 6, 2009. Its mother municipality is Morochata.

== See also ==
- Tunari National Park
