= Morochata Municipality =

Coordinates: 16.25°S 66.4167°W

- Municipality
- Interactive map of Morochata Municipality
- Country: Bolivia
- Department: Cochabamba Department
- Province: Ayopaya Province
- Seat: Morochata

Population (2001)
  - Total: 34,134
- Time zone: UTC-4 (BOT)

Morochata Municipality is the second municipal section of the Ayopaya Province in the Cochabamba Department, Bolivia. Its seat is Morochata.

== Geography ==
Some of the highest mountains of the municipality are listed below:

- Inka Q'asa
- Jatun Silla Q'asa
- Jatun Yuraq Q'asa
- Liqiliqini
- Parinani
- Pirwata
- Pukarani
- Pututuni
- Qiñwani Punta
- Q'illu Q'illu
- Salla Willk'i Punta
- Silla Q'asa
- Turi Turini
- Willpanki
- Wisk'achani
