= Puma Apachita =

Mountain in Bolivia

- Location within Bolivia

Highest point
- Elevation: 4,920 m (16,140 ft)
- Coordinates: 17°12′47″S 66°25′39″W

Geography
- Location: Bolivia, Cochabamba Department
- Parent range: Andes, Tunari mountain range

Puma Apachita (Aymara and Quechua puma cougar, puma, apachita the place of transit of an important pass in the principal routes of the Andes; a stone cairn, a little pile of rocks built along the trail in the high mountains, also spelled Puma Apacheta) is a mountain in the Tunari mountain range of the Bolivian Andes, about 4,920 m (16,142 ft) high. It is situated in the Cochabamba Department, Quillacollo Province, Quillacollo Municipality, northwest of Cochabamba. Puma Apachita lies southeast of Jatun Q'asa.

== See also ==
- Tunari
