= Sipe Sipe =

- Town
- Location within Bolivia
- Coordinates: 17°27′00″S 66°23′00″W
- Country: Bolivia
- Department: Cochabamba Department
- Province: Quillacollo Province
- Municipality: Sipe Sipe Municipality

Population (2012)
  - Total: 41,571
- Time zone: UTC-4 (BOT)

Sipe Sipe is a location in the Cochabamba Department in central Bolivia. It is the seat of the Sipe Sipe Municipality, the second municipal section of the Quillacollo Province.

== History ==
Sipe Sipe is a small town near which was fought the Battle of Sipe-Sipe. This decisive battle took place on 29 November 1815 and reestablished the control of Upper Peru to the Viceroyalty of Peru. As a consequence of this battle Upper Peru gained independence from Buenos Aires, and after the final defeat of Spain, Bolivia was born as a nation.

== Population ==
The evolution of the municipality population is as follows:

- 1992: 19,132 inhabitants
- 2001: 31,337 inhabitants
- 2005: 37,978 inhabitants
- 2012: 41,571 inhabitants

== See also ==
- Ch'aki Mayu
