= Liqiliqini (Cochabamba) =

Mountain in Bolivia

- Location within Bolivia

Highest point
- Elevation: 4,400 m (14,400 ft)
- Coordinates: 17°09′36″S 66°29′49″W

Geography
- Location: Bolivia, Cochabamba Department
- Parent range: Andes

Liqiliqini (Aymara liqiliqi, liqi liqi Southern lapwing or Andean lapwing, -ni a suffix to indicate ownership, "the one with the Southern lapwing (or Andean lapwing)", also spelled Lekhe Lekheni) is a mountain in the Bolivian Andes which reaches a height of approximately 4,400 m (14,400 ft). It is located in the Cochabamba Department, Ayopaya Province, Morochata Municipality. It lies east of the village of Paranani.

The Chullpa Q'asa Mayu ("chullpa pass river", Chullpa Khasa Mayu) which downstream is named Pukarani originates at the mountain. It flows to the northwest as an affluent of the Santa Rosa River.
