= Wila Qullu Punta =

Mountain in Bolivia

- Location within Bolivia

Highest point
- Elevation: 4,739 m (15,548 ft)
- Coordinates: 17°10′57″S 66°19′19″W

Geography
- Location: Bolivia, Cochabamba Department
- Parent range: Andes

Wila Qullu Punta (Aymara wila blood, blood-red, qullu mountain, also spelled Huila Kkollu Punta, Wila Kkollu Punta) is a 4,739-metre-high (15,548 ft) mountain in the Bolivian Andes. It is located in the Cochabamba Department, Quillacollo Province, Quillacollo Municipality.
