= Quillacollo =

City and municipality in Cochabamba, Bolivia

- City & Municipality
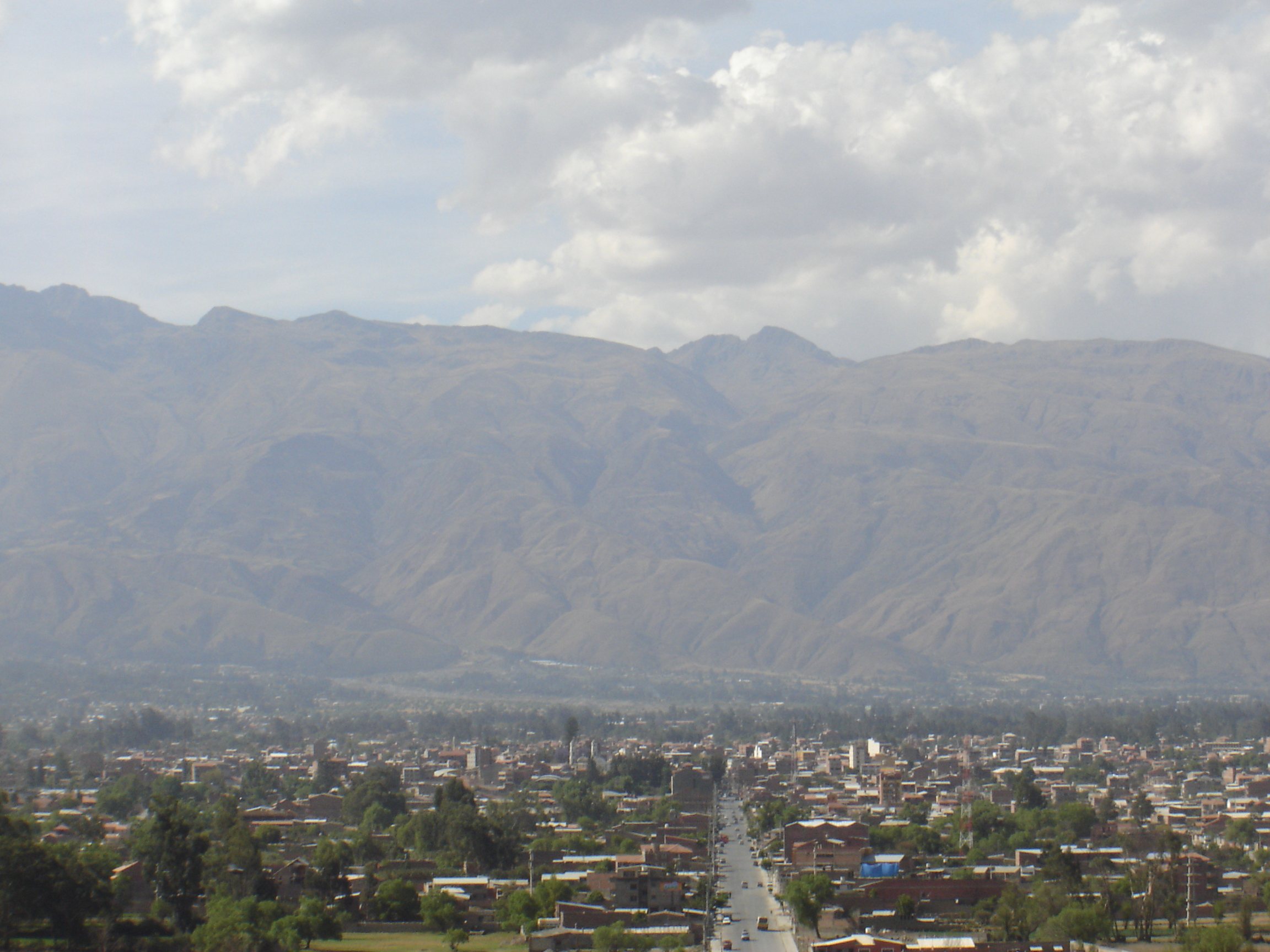

- Location within Bolivia
- Coordinates: 17°24′S 66°17′W
- Country: Bolivia
- Department: Cochabamba Department
- Province: Quillacollo Province
- Municipality: Quillacollo Municipality
- Canton: Quillacollo Canton
- Foundation: September 14, 1593 by Joan Zeñudo, José de Uribe, Cristóbal de Arévalo, Francisco de la Moya & Juan de Soliz
- Incorporated (municipality): 14 September 1905

Government
  - Mayor: Carla Lorena Pinto (MAS-IPSP, interim, 2010)
  - President: Marcelo Galindo Gómez (2007)

Area
  - City & Municipality: 566 km^{2} (219 sq mi)
- Elevation: 2,550 m (8,370 ft)

Population (2012 Census)
  - Urban: 117,859
- Time zone: UTC-4 (BOT)

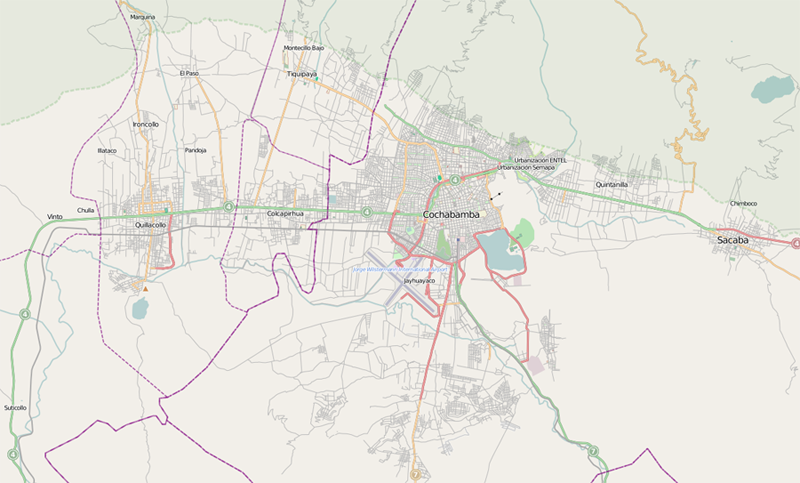
Map showing the location of Quillacollo

Quillacollo is the capital of Quillacollo Province in Cochabamba Department, Bolivia. The municipality was established on 14 September 1905 under the Presidency of Ismail Montes. It is located at 2,550 meters (8,370 ft) above sea level.

== Population and growth ==
The city of Quillacollo is located 13 km (8.1 mi) westward of Cochabamba City. Quillacollo's population is 74,980 based on the 2001 census. The National Statistics Institute estimated in 2010 that the population had grown unexpectedly rapidly to approximately 142,724. The increase in population makes Quillacollo the second fastest growing city in Bolivia after El Alto in La Paz.

Quillacollo City is one of the various provincial capitals around Cochabamba City, which are increasingly swallowed by the extending perimeter of "greater" Cochabamba (city).

Quillacollo is linked to the city of Cochabamba through the Avenida Blanco Galindo, a particularly busy stretch on the main national highway. Quillacollo is mostly a market town with a sizable agricultural hinterland, but also hosts some relevant industry and a district court which supports a relevant population of lawyers.

== Festivals ==
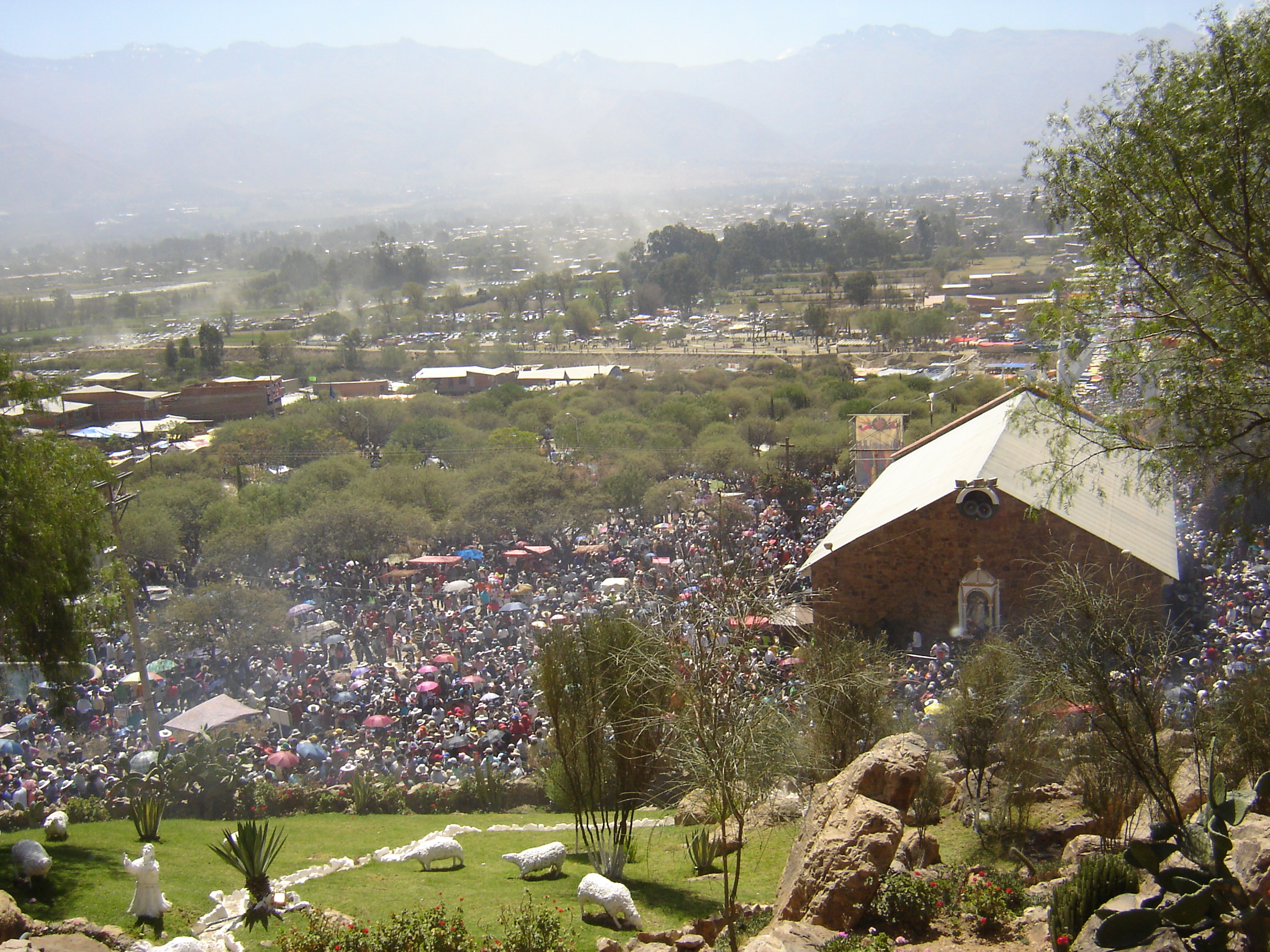
A view of the calvary of the Virgin of Urqupiña with pilgrims during the festival on August 16.

The Virgen de Urqupiña festival is held annually on August 15. It is officially dubbed the "Festival of National Integration" and sees a host of different activities, ranging from an extended folkloric spectacle, over a central Mass, generally attended by the Bolivian president and other authorities, to a huge popular pilgrimage in the course of which people profess their Catholic faith, but also engage in rituals which are commonly seen as standing in an uneasy relationship with Catholic orthodoxy at best, or being outright pagan. People pray and offer promises to the Virgin of Urqupiña for money, health and luck. People greet pachamama (mother earth) with alcohol and food, burying or spilling it on the floor. A curious rite held on this festivity is extracting rocks from a hill near the sanctuary of the Virgin, whether the rock is big or small, it has to be taken home with the people who cracked the rocky hill to get it, who must return it the next year, as a symbolic act to ask the Virgin to lend them something (like health, money, luck etc.).

The Urqupiña festival is annually attended by hundreds of thousands of faithful and national and international tourists, and it is one of the biggest events of popular religiosity in South America. Stretched out in preparations and aftermath over the entire month of August, the central days of the Urkupiña festival are August 14 to 16. While it falls on the same day as the Feast of the Assumption, and so mirrors other Marian celebrations elsewhere, Urqupiña has spawned a variety of offshoots in other parts of the world, such as Argentina, Virginia (USA), Spain, and Sweden, and wherever a sufficient number of followers of the Marian basilica of Quillacollo dwell.

However, in addition to the pagan religions, Protestantism also stands against the orthodoxy of the Church of Rome in Quillacollo, with various denominations represented, one of which is the reformed baptist tradition, by the Iglesia de Quillacollo.

== The city ==
The architecture of the city has a post-colonial blend. Contemporary architecture is seen in modern houses and buildings.

Gastronomy in the city is varied. Several restaurants are found in the city's streets. The city also offers electronic artifacts cheaper than in Cochabamba.

One of Quillacollo's main economic resources is tourism. Quillacollo has hotels and hostels to stay. Flea markets and informal commerce abound in the city, especially during the festivities. Sunday is market day.
