= Jatun Q'asa (Cochabamba) =

Mountain in Bolivia

- Location within Bolivia

Highest point
- Elevation: 5,045 m (16,552 ft)
- Coordinates: 17°11′10″S 66°27′00″W

Geography
- Location: Bolivia, Cochabamba Department
- Parent range: Andes, Tunari mountain range

Jatun Q'asa (Quechua jatun, hatun big, great, q'asa mountain pass, "great mountain pass", Hispanicized spelling Jatun Khasa, Jatúncasa) is a mountain in the Tunari mountain range of the Bolivian Andes, about 5,025 m (16,486 ft) high. It is situated north-west of Cochabamba in the Cochabamba Department, Quillacollo Province, in the west of the Quillacollo Municipality.

== See also ==
- Puma Apachita
- Tunari
