= Quillacollo Province =

- Province
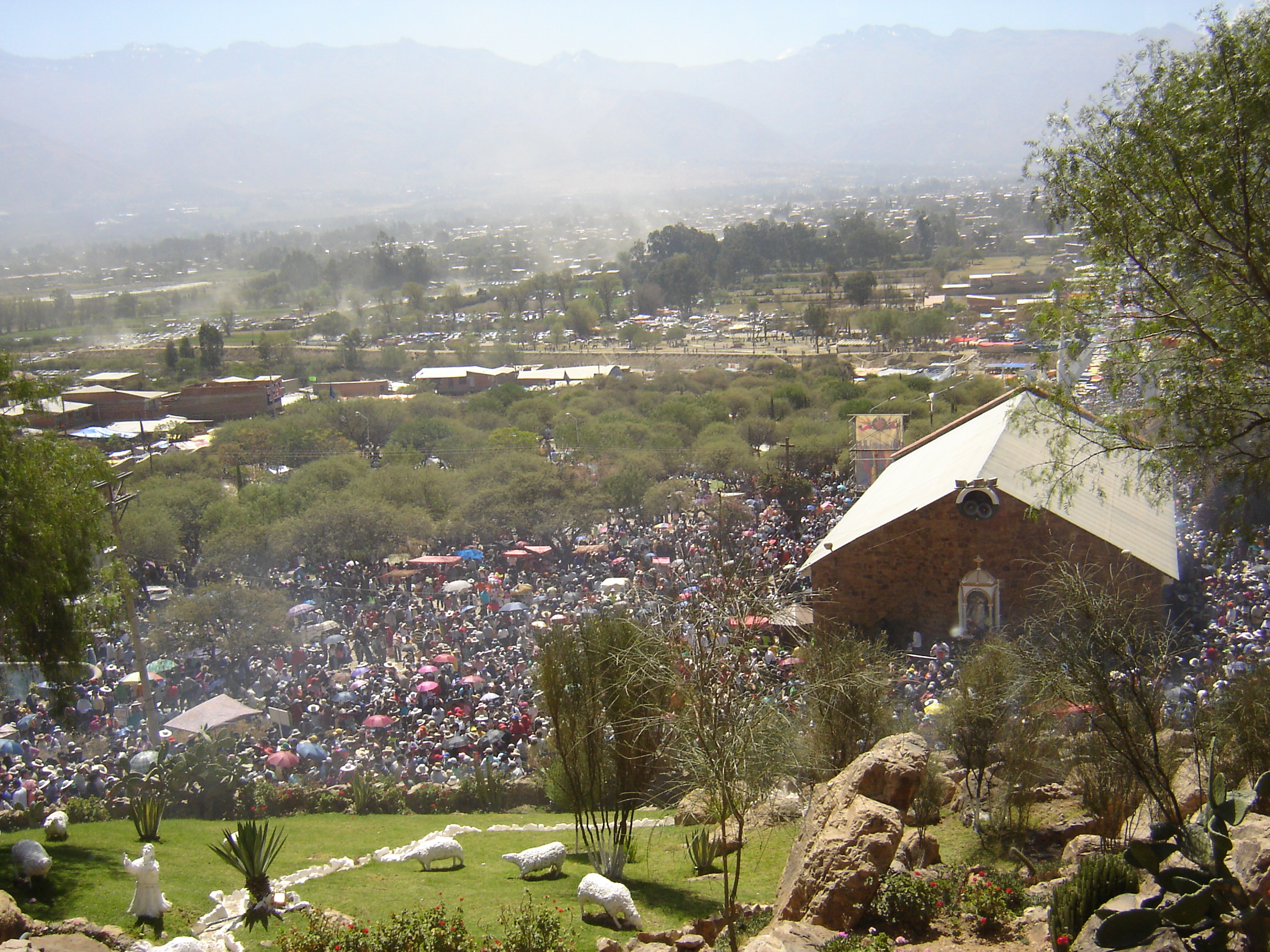
- A view of the calvary of the Virgin of Urqupiña with pilgrims during the festival on August 16

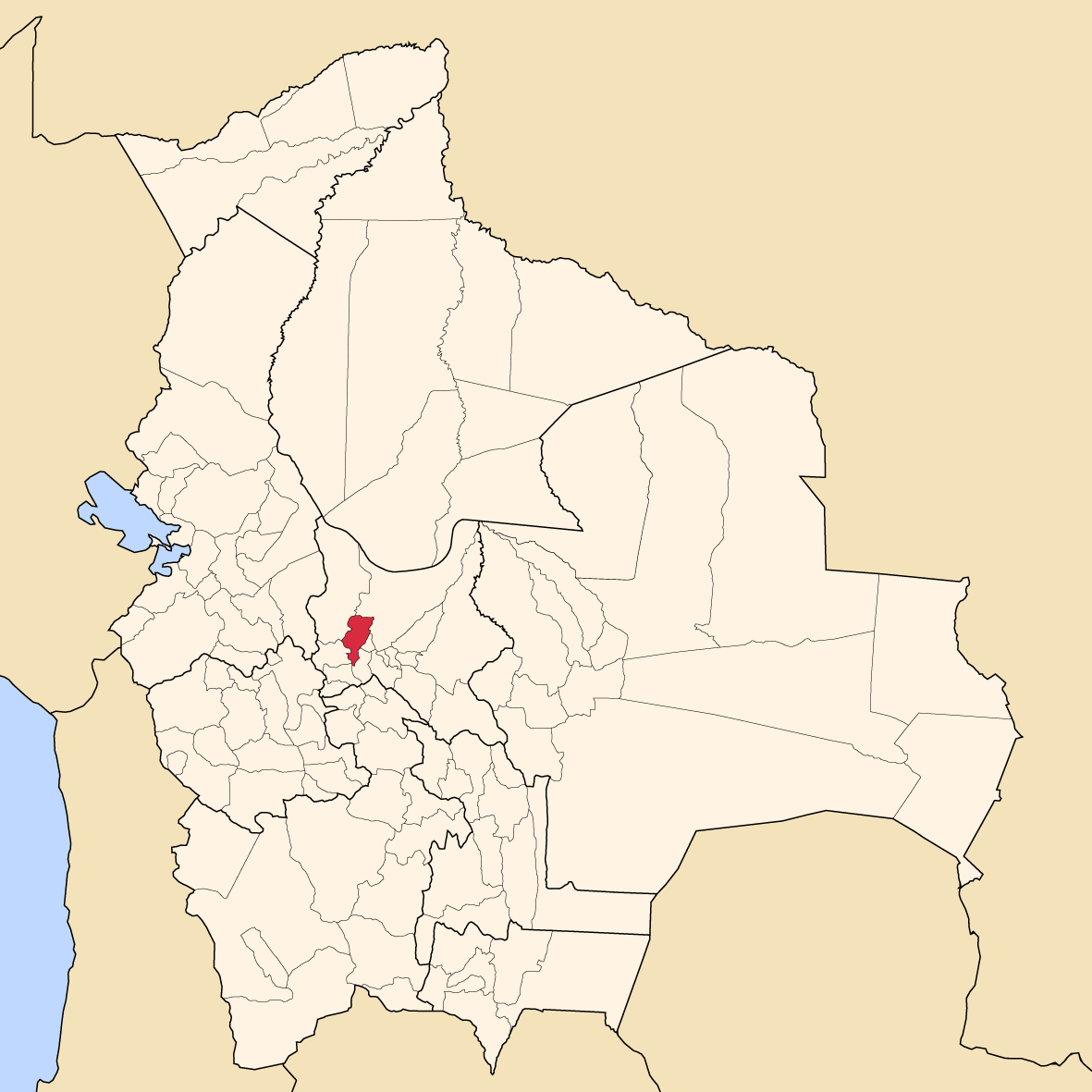
- Location of Quillacollo Province within Bolivia

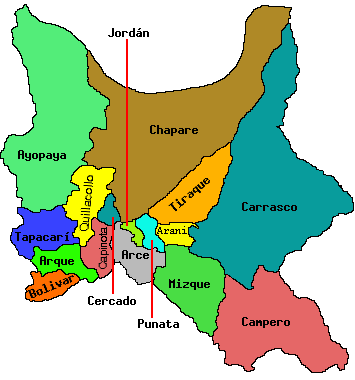
- Coordinates: 17°20′S 66°15′W
- Country: Bolivia
- Department: Cochabamba Department
- Municipalities: 5
- Cantons: 12
- Capital: Quillacollo

Government
  - Mayor: Hugo Cesar Miguel Candia (2007)

Area
  - Total: 280 sq mi (720 km^{2})

Population (2012)
  - Total: 336,615
  - Density: 1,210/sq mi (468/km^{2})
  - Ethnicities: Quechua
- Time zone: UTC-4 (BOT)

Quillacollo is a province in the Cochabamba Department, Bolivia. It is known for its festival in August where people from all over Bolivia come and pay homage to the Virgin of Urqupiña (Virgen de Urqupiña). Quillacollo is said to be one of the fastest-growing cities in Bolivia.

== Geography ==
One of the highest peaks of the province is Tunari at 5,023 m (16,480 ft). Other mountains are listed below:

- Allqamari
- Asir Qullu
- Atuq Wachana
- Awila Wachana Punta
- Ch'uñawi
- Ichhu Apachita
- Inka Laqaya
- Jalsuri
- Janq'u Qala
- Jatun Kimray Punta
- Jatun Punta
- Jatun Q'asa
- Jukumarini
- Kimsa Tinkuy
- K'ayrani
- Llaqa K'uchu Punta
- Mamani Punta
- Nasa Q'ara
- Panti Pata
- Patilla Pata
- Pichaqani
- Pirwata
- Puka Salli
- Puka Waka
- Pukyu P'unqu
- Puma Apachita
- Phullu Punchu
- P'ukru Urqu
- P'utu P'utu
- Qillqata
- Qina Qina
- Qiñwa Q'asa
- Qiñwani
- Qullpani Punta
- Quna Quna Q'asa
- Q'ara Apachita
- Q'illu Suchusqa
- Rumi Q'asa
- Salla Q'asa
- Sankayuni
- Tikrasqa
- Tunari
- Turi Rumi
- T'ula Jayani Apachita
- Uqi Salli Punta
- Urqu Punta
- Wari Warini
- Wayna Tunari
- Wila Qullu Punta
- Wila Wila
- Wisk'achani
- Yana Qaqa
- Yarita Punta
- Yuraq Q'asa
- Yuraq Yaku

== Subdivision ==
The province is divided into five municipalities which are further subdivided into cantons.

Section	Municipality	Seat
1st	Quillacollo Municipality	Quillacollo
2nd	Sipe Sipe Municipality	Sipe Sipe
3rd	Tiquipaya Municipality	Tiquipaya
4th	Vinto Municipality	Vinto
5th	Colcapirhua Municipality	Colcapirhua

== Languages ==
The languages spoken in the Quillacollo Province are mainly Spanish and Quechua. The following table shows the number of those belonging to the recognized group of speakers.

Language	Quillacollo Municipality	Sipe Sipe Municipality	Tiquipaya Municipality	Vinto Municipality	Colcapirhua Municipality
Quechua	52,399	23,819	19,308	18,630	18,050
Aymara	7,101	1,127	2,481	2,259	2,449
Guaraní	101	24	43	38	38
Another native	82	24	36	26	46
Spanish	93,131	23,059	32,704	26,355	38,441
Foreign	2,087	215	1,100	403	1,136
Only native	5,756	6,544	2,972	3,332	1,365
Native and Spanish	50,157	17,704	17,737	16,680	18,139
Only Spanish	43,003	5,358	15,000	9,684	20,314

== See also ==
- Ch'aki Mayu
- Inka Raqay
- Sayt'u Qucha
- Tunari National Park
