= Tunari (Bolivia) =

Mountain in Bolivia

- Location within Bolivia

Highest point
- Elevation: 5,035 m (16,519 ft)
- Coordinates: 17°17′08″S 66°23′30″W

Geography
- Location: Bolivia, Cochabamba Department
- Parent range: Andes, Tunari mountain range

Tunari is a mountain in the Tunari mountain range of the Bolivian Andes, about 5,023 m (16,480 ft) high. It is situated in the Cochabamba Department, Quillacollo Province, Quillacollo Municipality, northwest of Quillacollo. Tunari lies southeast of Wayna Tunari.

== See also ==
- Jatun Q'asa
- Puma Apachita
