= Totora =

Totora may refer to:

- Totora (plant), a South American plant
- Totora Municipality, Carrasco Province, Cochabamba Department, Bolivia
- Totora, Cochabamba, a town in Totora Municipality, Bolivia
- Totora, Oruro, a town in Bolivia
- Totora District, in Amazonas, Peru

== See also ==
- Tōtara, a tree endemic to New Zealand
- T'utura, a mountain in Bolivia
