= Warawarani =

Warawarani (Aymara warawara star, -ni a suffix, "the one with a star", also spelled Buarahuarani, Huara Huarani, Huarahuarani, Wara Warani) may refer to:

- Warawarani (Bolivia), a mountain in the La Paz Department, Bolivia
- Warawarani (Cochabamba), a mountain in the Tapacari Province, Cochabamba Department, Bolivia
- Warawarani (Peru), a mountain in the Tacna Region, Peru
- Warawarani (Yuraq Qaqa), a mountain near Yuraq Qaqa in the Tapacari Province, Cochabamba Department, Bolivia
