= Siwinqani (Tapacarí) =

Mountain in Bolivia

- Location within Bolivia

Highest point
- Elevation: 4,265 m (13,993 ft)
- Coordinates: 17°37′38″S 66°49′06″W

Geography
- Location: Bolivia, Cochabamba Department
- Parent range: Andes

Siwinqani (Aymara siwinqa a kind of cactus, -ni a suffix, "the one with the siwinqa plant", also spelled Sehuencani) is a 4,265-metre-high (13,993 ft) mountain in the Bolivian Andes. It is located in the Cochabamba Department, Tapacari Province. Siwinqani lies northwest of Jach'a Ch'utu and Turu Qullu.
