= Chachakumani (Cochabamba) =

Mountain in Bolivia

- Location within Bolivia

Highest point
- Elevation: 4,592 m (15,066 ft)
- Coordinates: 17°34′54″S 66°54′10″W

Geography
- Location: Bolivia, Cochabamba Department
- Parent range: Andes

Chachakumani (Quechua chachakuma a medical plant, -ni an Aymara suffix, "the one with the chachakuma plant, also spelled Chachacomani) is a 4,592-metre-high (15,066 ft) mountain in the Bolivian Andes. It is located in the Cochabamba Department, Tapacari Province. Chachakumani lies northwest of Janq'u Pukara and Ñuñu Qullu.
