= Carnival of Huanchaco =

Annual summer festival in Huanchaco, Brazil

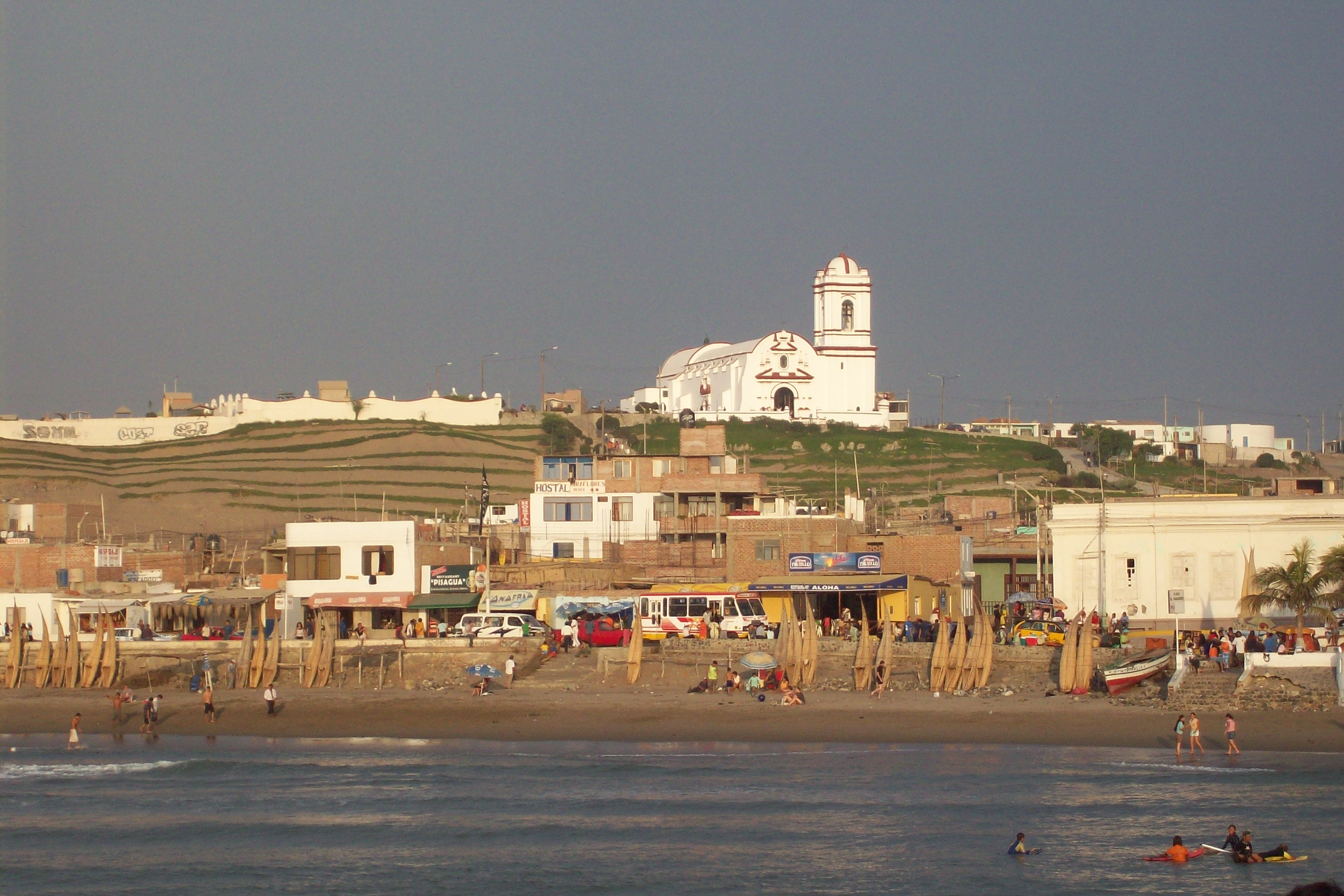
- View of Huanchaco
- Genre: Festival
- Begins: February 2
- Ends: March 10
- Frequency: annual
- Location: Huanchaco (Trujillo city)
- Years active: 1977 - present
- Inaugurated: early 20th century
- Most recent: 35° edition (2012)
- Attendance: 15.000
- Website: www.munihuanchaco.gob.pe

Carnival of Huanchaco (spanish:Carnaval de Huanchaco ), is a summer festival held each year in Huanchaco, one of the most visited beaches of Trujillo city, in northern Peru. The carnival is renowned for a lack of alcohol and an early finish. Stories of fire parties on the beach are unfounded. It is organized by the Club Huanchaco, consists of several activities including the crowning of the queen, surf contest, luau party, creativity in the sand, championships of Caballito de totora, the carnival parade among others, by 2012 the carnival parade was held on 25 February.

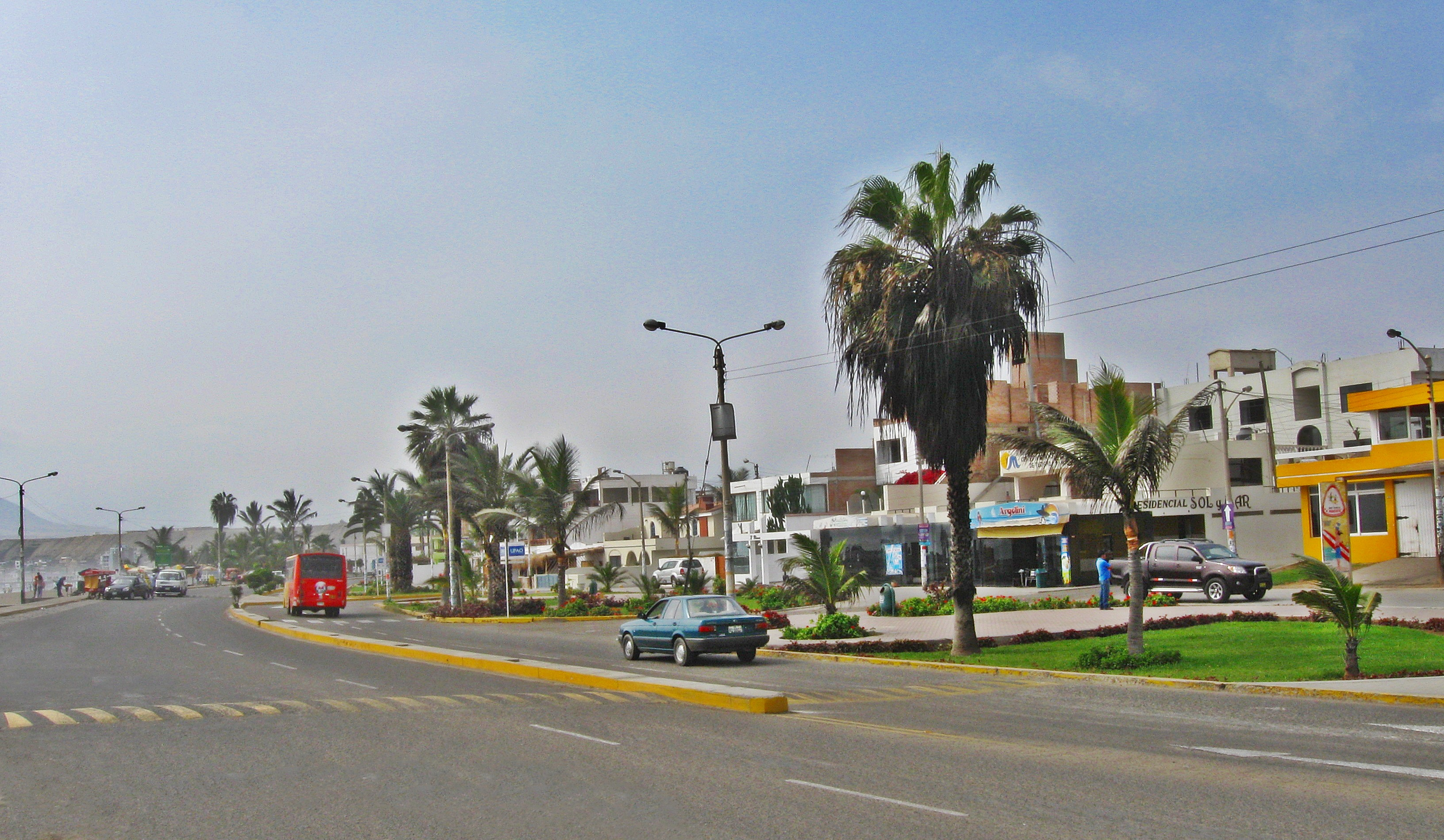
La Ribera avenue in Huanchaco

== Description ==
The carnival has been held since the beginning of the 20th century, villagers performed a carnival in Huanchaco emulating the famous Venetian Carnival by that time, with the passing of time and the new generations it became organized by the Club Huanchaco, consists of several events and activities including the crowning of the queen, surf contest, luau party, creativity in the sand, championships of Caballito de totora, the carnival parade among others, by 2012 the carnival parade was held on 25 February.

== Events ==
The principal events are:

- Presentation of queens
- Luau party
- Traditional Parade, It takes place in some of the principal streets of Huanchaco city.
- Palo Cilulo, The people dance around a tree decorated with presents and they turns to cut the tree little by little until it falls down. When this happens people come to the tree to take the presents while people plays with water and some colored creams for their faces. Generally the dances in the palo cilulo are entertained by bands of musicians with huayno music.
Huanchaco
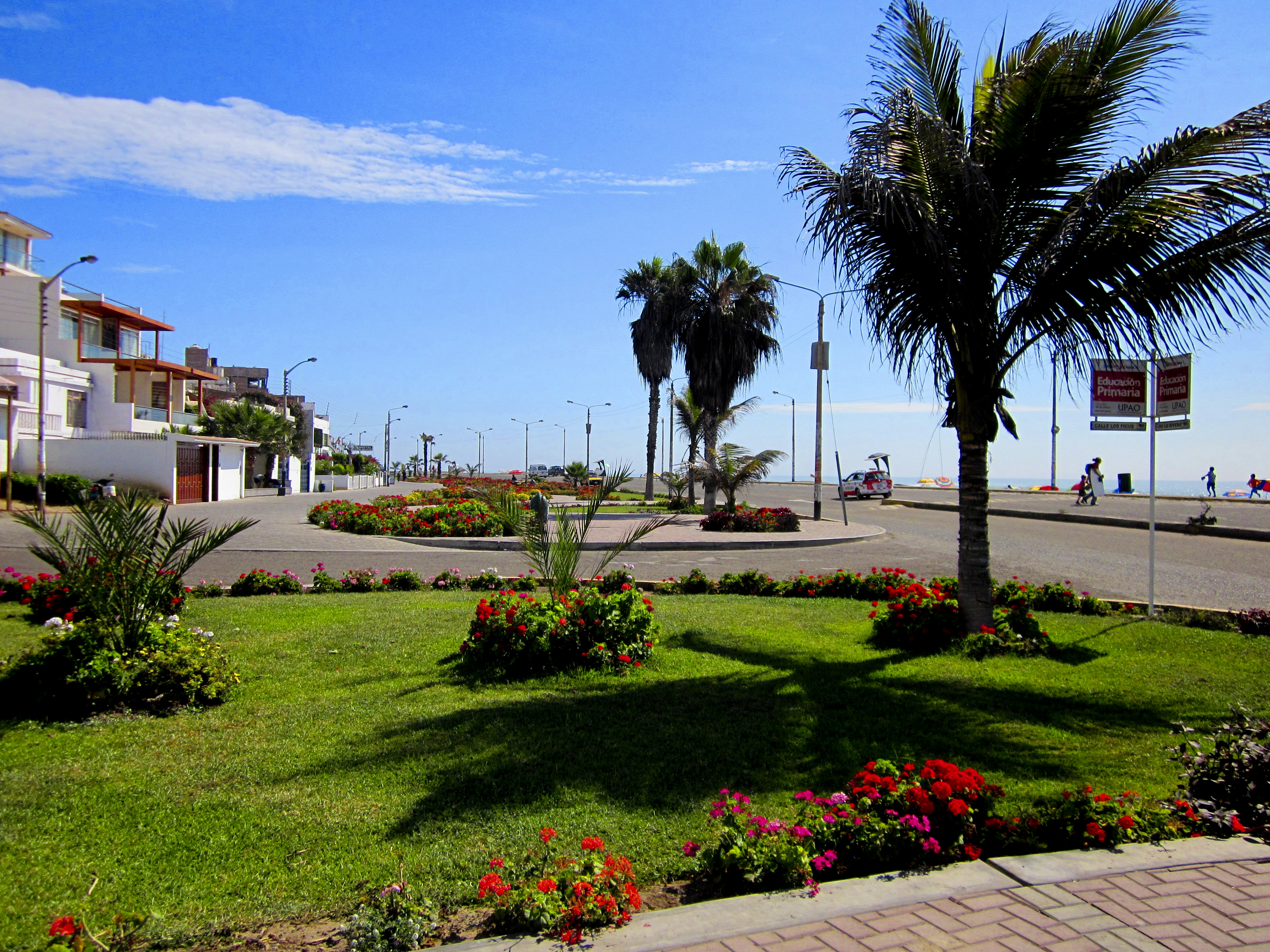
Palo cilulo is a dance around a tree in the carnival

== Characters of the festival ==
The principal characters are:

- Queen of carnival she is the queen of the festival.
- Troupes
- Allegorical cars
- Bands of musicians, they animate the dances in the carnival.

== Gallery ==
Huanchaco beach

== See also ==
- Trujillo Spring Festival
- San Jose Festival
- Trujillo Book Festival
- Trujillo
- Santiago de Huamán
- Victor Larco Herrera District
