= Pampas Gramalote =

Archaeological site in Peru

Pampas Gramalote was a Prehispanic fishing village near the town of Huanchaco, Peru that existed between 2000 and 1200 B.C. It is the oldest archaeological settlement known in the area, providing a direct link between the contemporary coastal communities and their ancestors living in traditional fishing villages. The village was discovered in 1973 by archaeologist Charles Hastings. A temple in the village was used to perform rituals by fishermen before heading out to sea to hunt sharks over 3,000 years ago.

According to archaeologist Gabriel Prieto, this place is important because it has all the elements to be considered the origin of urban planning and religious ideology in the valley, which later materializes and expresses itself in societies like the Moche and Chimú.
