= Kuntur Ikiña =

Kuntur Ikiña Aymara kunturi condor, ikiña to sleep, Hispanicized spellings Condor Iquiña, Condorigueña, Condorqueña, Condorquiña) may refer to:

- Kuntur Ikiña (Cochabamba), a mountain in the Cochabamba Department, Bolivia
- Kuntur Ikiña (Cusco), a mountain in the Cusco Region, Peru
- Kuntur Ikiña (Lampa), a mountain in the Lampa Province, Puno Region, Peru
- Kuntur Ikiña (Puno), a mountain in the Puno Province, Puno Region, Peru
- Kuntur Ikiña (Sajama), a mountain in Bolivia
