= World Surfing Reserves =

Program to protect surf habitats

- Logo of World Surfing Reserves program
- Formation: 2009
- Founder: National Surfing Reserves Australia / Save The Waves Coalition
- Purpose: Protect exceptional surf spots
- Parent organization: Save the Waves Coalition

World Surfing Reserves (WSR) is a program launched in 2009 by the non-governmental organization Save the Waves Coalition aimed at protecting global surf habitats. The program proactively identifies, designates and enshrines international waves, surf zones and surrounding environments, protecting them from the threat of development.

== History ==
The idea to protect surf spots originally came from to one of the cofounders of the program, the National Surfing Reserves (NSR) in Australia. After four years of naming surf spots in Australia, NSR partnered with the NGO Save the Waves Coalition and launched the World Surfing Reserves to go international with their protection program. Professional big-wave surfer Joao de Macedo is also a co-founder of the program. It was officially launched at the Value of Waves Roundtable held in Half Moon Bay, California.

== Locations ==
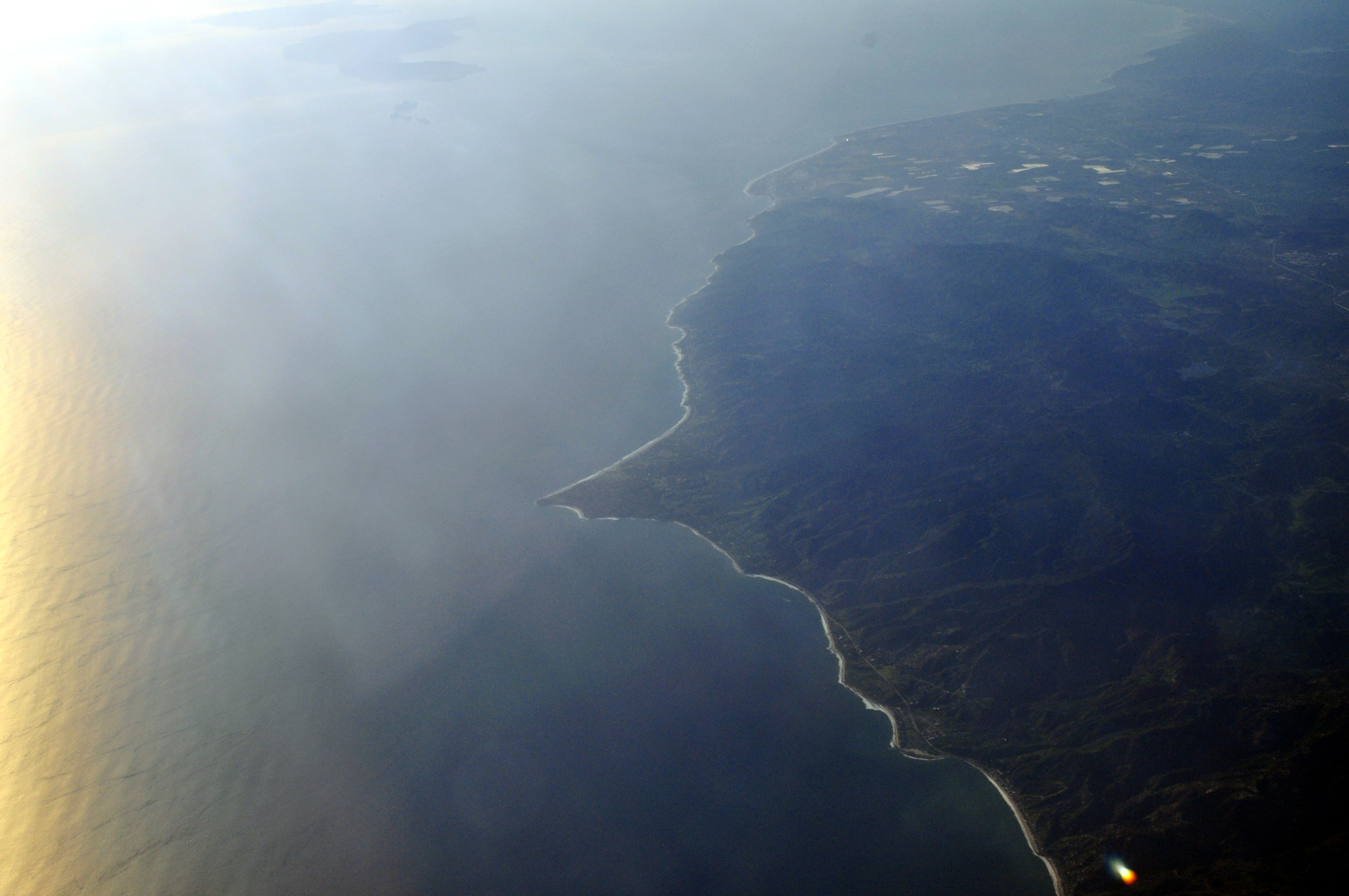
Aerial view of Malibu. Malibu Surfrider Beach was the first location called "World Surfing Reserve."

There are currently twelve surfing reserves across the world. World Surfing Reserves are nominated through a selection process and there are currently dozens of proposed WSRs covering nearly every continent on the planet. The dates indicated the commencement of the commitment by the local and international communities to protect and preserve Malibu as an iconic surf site.

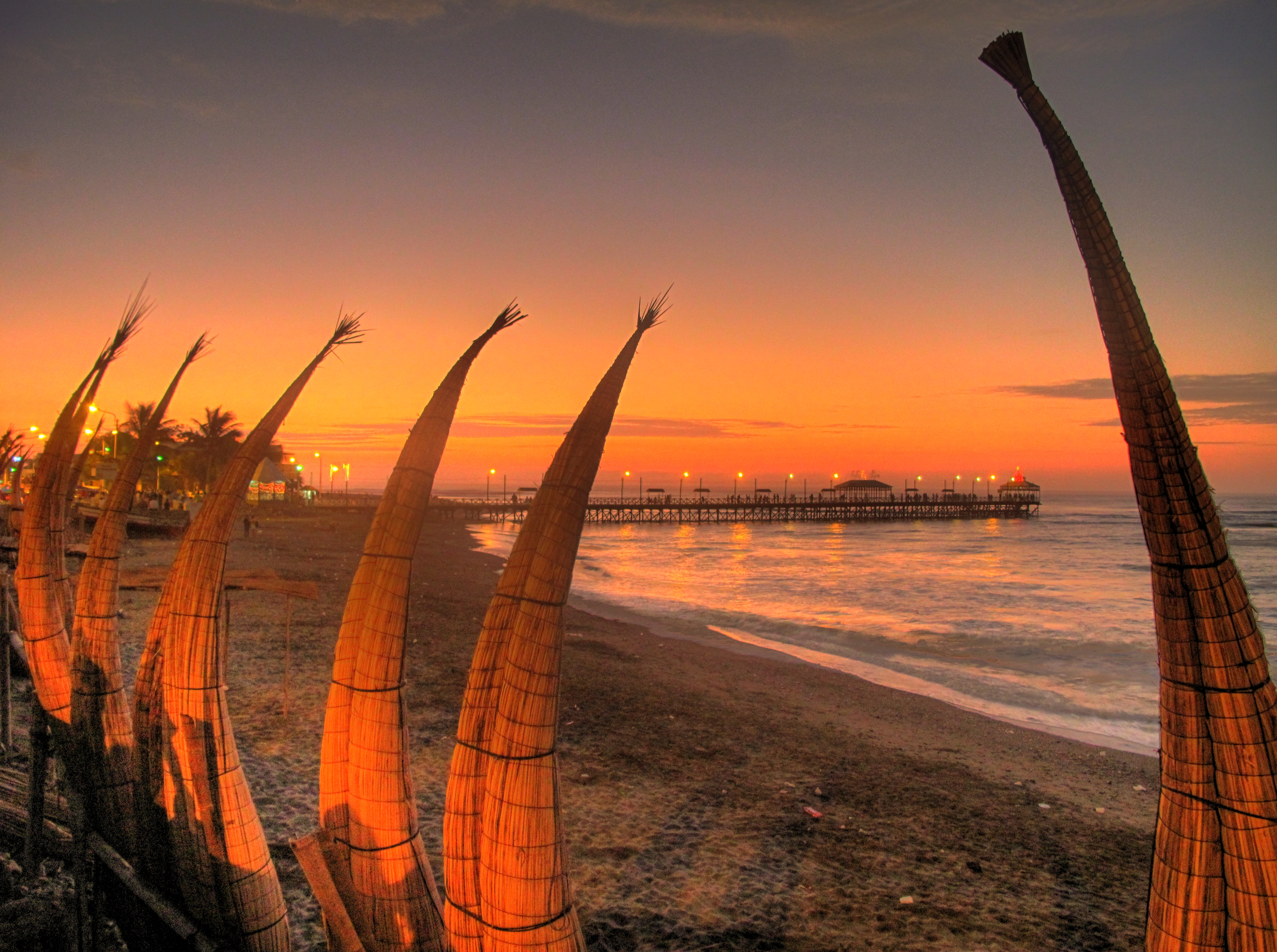
Caballitos de totora in Huanchaco beach sunset. Caballitos de Totora are considered one of the first ways of surfing.

World Surfing Reserves
Nb	Country	Location	Since	Note
1	USA	Malibu Surfrider Beach	9 October 2010	1st World Surfing Reserve site.
2	Portugal	Ericeira	14 October 2011	4 km stretch, 7 surf spots (including Ribeira d’Ilhas and Coxos), recognized for its high density of surf breaks, wave quality, and unique environment.
3	Australia	Freshwater Beach	10 March 2012	4 km stretch, declared the "Manly-Freshwater World Surfing Reserve", inaugurated by Kelly Slater and Marie Bashir (governor of New South Wales).
4	USA	Santa Cruz, California	27–28 April 2012	Inaugurated by Pat O'Neil (O'Neill wetsuits).
5	Peru	Huanchaco beach, Trujillo	26 October 2013	The surf spot is famous for the caballitos de totora.
6	Mexico	Todos Santos Islands	20 June 2014	stretch from Salsipuedes to El Sauzal.
8	Australia	Gold Coast	8 March 2016	16 km stretch from Burleigh to Snapper Rocks.
9	Brazil	Guarda do Embaú	28 October 2019	World-class wave that breaks consistently year-round.
10	Chile	Punta de Lobos	20 November 2017	WSR purchased the Mirador Property at the tip of the Punta de Lobos to protect this area.
11	Australia	Noosa Beach	20 November 2017	4 km stretch
12	United Kingdom	North Devon	January 2022	Encompasses 30 km of coastline and includes some outstanding surfing locations like Croyde, Saunton, and Woolacombe.
13	El Salvador	Oriente Salvaje	16 November 2024	Hosts some of the last truly wild tropical dry forests (northern Central America). 19 km stretch of coastline with over a dozen named surf spots like Las Flores and Punta Mango.

== Mission ==
The mission of the World Surfing Reserves (WSR) program is to gain international recognition and support for wave and coastal protection around the world by creating a global network of designated surfing reserves. WSR also recognizes environmental, social, cultural and economic benefits of waves. WSR was created in conjunction with National Surfing Reserves Australia, and has established partnerships with the International Surfing Association (ISA), and Stanford University's Center for Responsible Travel (CREST). WSR is also affiliated with the Surf Conservation Partnership led by Conservation International.

In August 2009, WSR called for nominations from all national surfing federations. More than 150 sites were nominated from 34 countries. WSR eventually plans to induct 30-40 surf breaks around the world. The program has gained a substantial amount of positive feedback and support from the sport's leaders, including Kelly Slater.

== Council and committee ==
World Surfing Reserves is led by an international executive committee and vision council. It is the responsibility of these groups to govern the program and make the final wave selections. For a specific surf site to enter WSR, the region must have exceptional and consistent surf, along with a rich history and culture of surfing, as well as strong community support.

Vision Council

Fernando Aguerre, Will Henry, Jim Moriarty, Tony Butt, Terry Gibson, Len Materman, Miles Walsh, Wallace J. Nichols, Steve Hawk, Wayne “Rabbit” Bartholomew, Tiago Pires, Greg Long, Mark Massara, Chris LaFrankie, Chad Nelsen, Neil Lazarow, Brad Farmer, Manolo Lozano, Juca De Barros, Drew Kampion, Professor Andy Short, Professor Ben Finney.

Executive Committee

Professor Andy Short, Brad Farmer, Drew Kampion, Will Henry, Dean LaTourrette.

== Google Earth Plug-In ==
Save the Waves Coalition also created a Google Earth WSR plug-in that allows organizations and individuals to view nominated sites around the world. The plug-in allows users to learn about a nominated wave's history, location, environmental characteristics and surf culture.

== See also ==
- Huanchaco
- Trujillo
- Malibu Lagoon State Beach
