= Wila Jaqhi (disambiguation) =

Wila Jaqhi, or Huila Aje, is a mountain in Cusco Region, Peru.

Wila Jaqhi may also refer to:

- Wila Jaqhi (Bolivia), a mountain in Tapacarí Province, Cochabamba Department, Bolivia
- Wila Jaqhi (Punata), a mountain in Punata Province, Cochabamba Department, Bolivia
