= Janq'u Qalani (Cochabamba) =

Mountain in Bolivia

- Location within Bolivia

Highest point
- Elevation: 4,425 m (14,518 ft)
- Coordinates: 17°41′14″S 66°50′45″W

Geography
- Location: Bolivia, Cochabamba Department
- Parent range: Andes

Janq'u Qalani (Aymara janq'u white, qala stone, -ni a suffix, "the one with the white stone", also spelled Jankho Khalani) is a 4,425-metre-high (14,518 ft) mountain in the Bolivian Andes. It is located in the Cochabamba Department, Tapacari Province. Janq'u Qalani lies northeast of Q'ara Willk'i and Lluxita.
