= Swamps of Huanchaco =

Peruvian ecologial reserve

Coordinates: 8.0606°S 79.1284°W

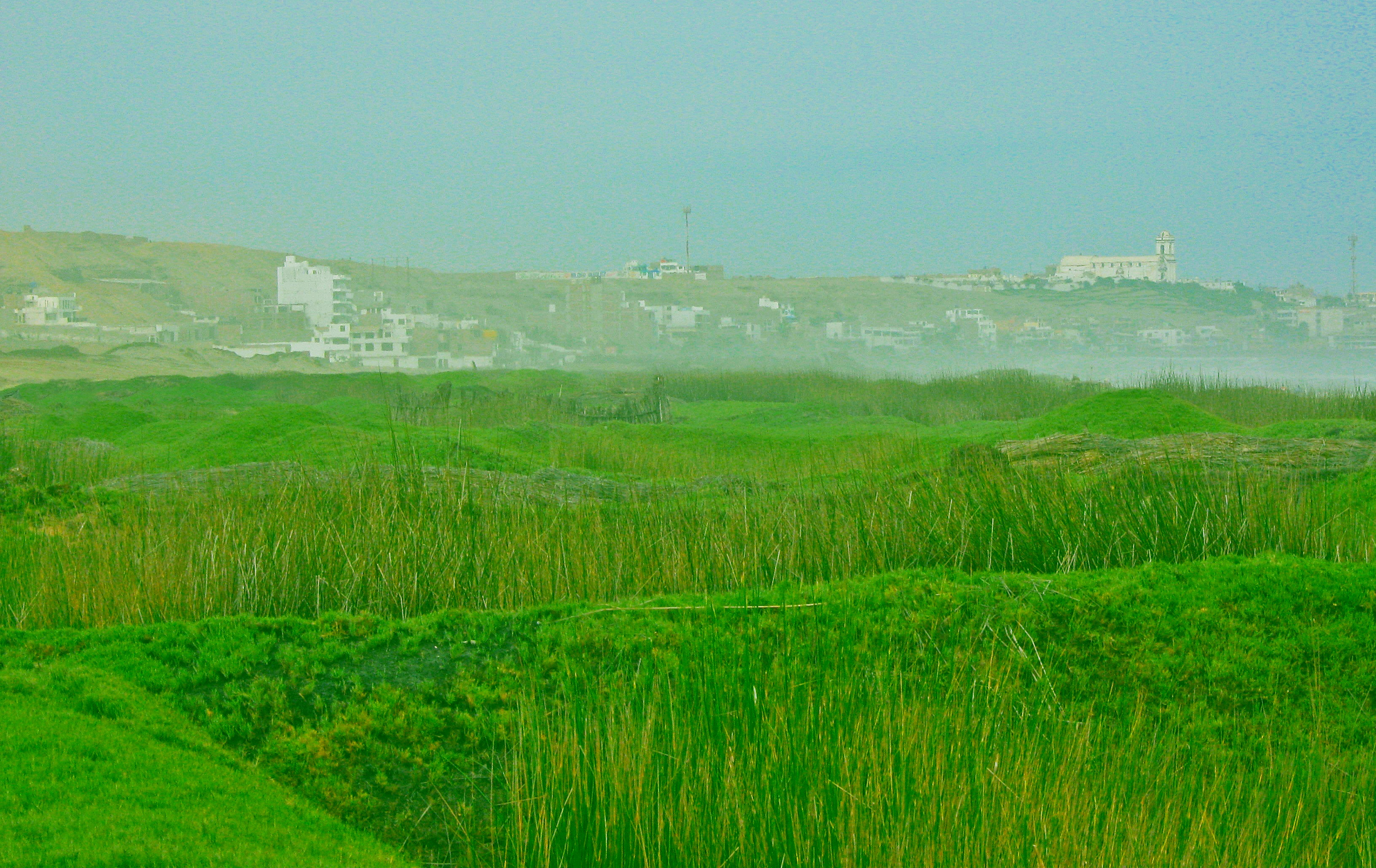
Swamps of Huanchaco is an ecological Chimu reserve, about 14 km northwest of the historic center of Trujillo city, Peru. From this ecological reserve the ancient mochica extracted the raw material, a bulrush or reed known as totora grass or Schoenoplectus californicus for the manufacture of the ancient Caballitos de totora used since the time of the Moche for fishing.

Swamps of Huanchaco, also known as Wetlands of Huanchaco, is an ecological Chimu reserve located in Huanchaco Beach, about 14 km northwest of Trujillo city, Peru. From this ecological reserve the ancient mochica extracted the raw material for the manufacture of the ancient Caballitos de totora used since the time of the Moche for fishing. Currently Huanchaco fishermen still use their materials from this swamps to make their ships of work.

== Tourist and ecological park ==
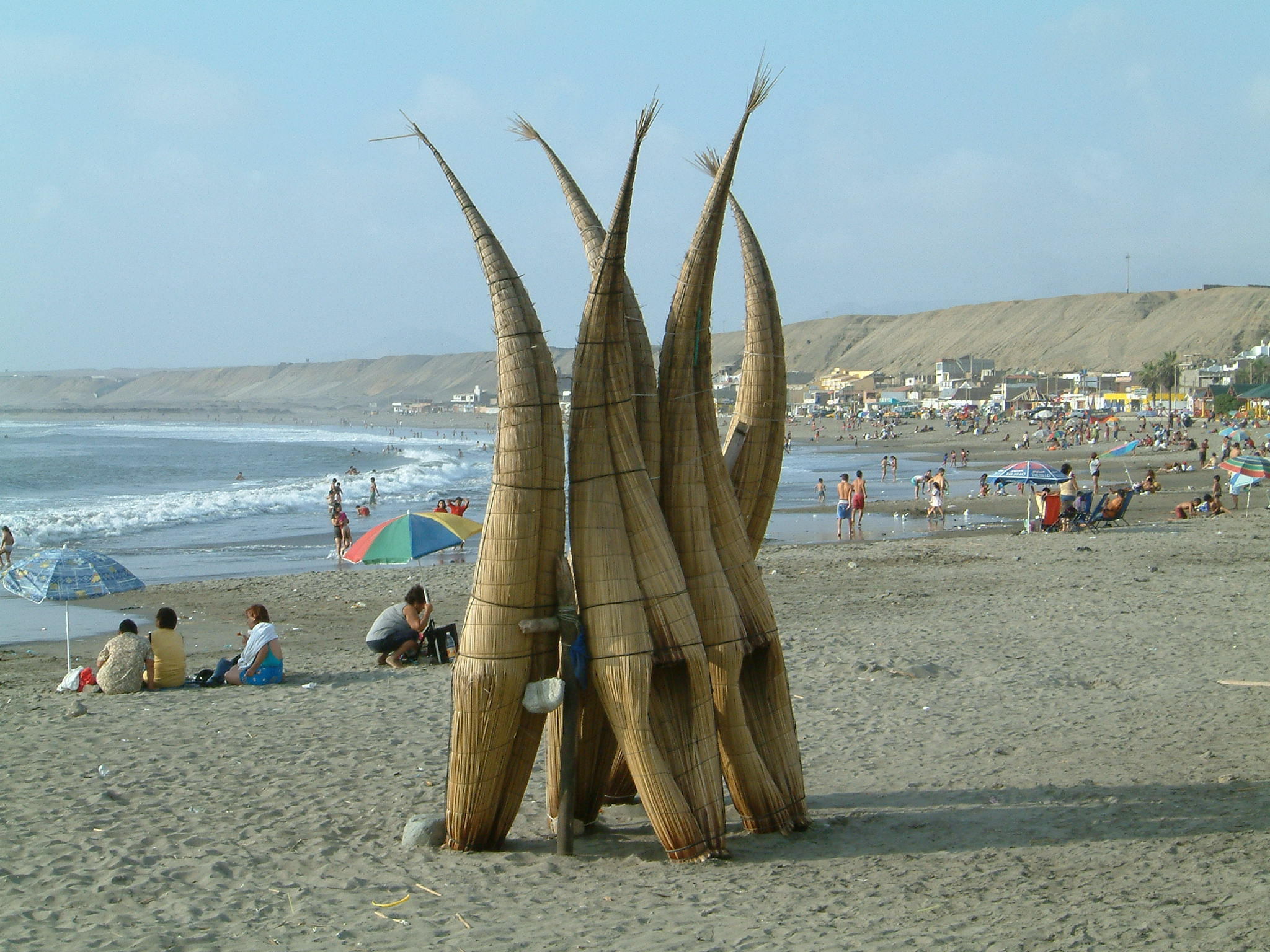
Caballitos de totora

=== Huanchaco Totorales ===
The ancient mochicas developed formidable cultivation techniques in the arid coastline of northern Peru. One is planting wachaques ('dug wells') to find the water near the sea. The brackish waters were able to adapt the totora (Scirpus californicus). The reeds allowed the mochicas to be considered lords of the Pacific Ocean since ancient times. The Huanchaco fishermen were shown as eminent navigators, making long trips overseas in their reed boats.

== See also ==
- Huanchaco
- Moche
- Chimu
- Víctor Larco Herrera District
- Vista Alegre
- Buenos Aires
- Las Delicias
