= Kuntur Chukuña =

Kuntur Chukuña (Aymara kunturi condor, chukuña to squat, to cower, 'where the condor squats', also spelled Condor Chucuna, Condor Chucuña) may refer to:

- Kuntur Chukuña (Cochabamba), a mountain in the Tapacari Province, Cochabamba Department, Bolivia
- Kuntur Chukuña (Antonio Quijarro), a mountain in the Antonio Quijarro Province, Potosí Department, Bolivia
- Kuntur Chukuña (Oruro), a mountain in the Sebastián Pagador Province Oruro Department, Bolivia
