= Janq'u Qalani =

Janq'u Qalani (Aymara janq'u white, qala stone, -ni a suffix, "the one with the white stone", also spelled Janco Khalani, Jankho Khalani) may refer to:

- Janq'u Qalani (Cochabamba), a mountain in the Cochabamba Department, Bolivia
- Janq'u Qalani (La Paz), a mountain in the Murillo Province, La Paz Department, Bolivia
- Janq'u Qalani (Pacajes), a mountain in the Pacajes Province, La Paz Department, Bolivia
- Janq'u Qalani (Oruro), a mountain in the Oruro Department, Bolivia
