= T'utura =

Mountain in Bolivia

- Location within Bolivia

Highest point
- Elevation: 4,242 m (13,917 ft)
- Coordinates: 17°24′20″S 66°40′53″W

Geography
- Location: Bolivia, Cochabamba Department
- Parent range: Andes

T'utura (Quechua for Schoenoplectus californicus, also spelled Totora) is a 4,242-metre-high (13,917 ft) mountain in the Bolivian Andes. It is located in the Cochabamba Department, in the northern part of the Tapacari Province. T'utura lies northwest of Warawarani and northeast of Waylluma.
