= Yaritani (Cochabamba) =

Mountain in Bolivia

- Location within Bolivia

Highest point
- Elevation: 4,140 m (13,580 ft)
- Coordinates: 17°26′10″S 66°37′54″W

Geography
- Location: Bolivia, Cochabamba Department
- Parent range: Andes

Yaritani (yarita local name for Azorella compacta, Aymara -ni a suffix, "the one with the yarita plant", also spelled Yaretani) is a mountain in the Bolivian Andes which reaches a height of approximately 4,140 m (13,580 ft). It is located in the Cochabamba Department, Tapacari Province. Yaritani lies southeast of Llust'a Q'asa.
