= Chachakumani (disambiguation) =

Chachakumani (Quechua chachakuma a medical plant, -ni an Aymara suffix to indicate ownership, "the one with the chachakuma plant, Hispanicized spellings Chachacomani, Chachacumani) may refer to:

- Chachakumani, a mountain in the La Paz Department, Bolivia
- Chachakumani (Canchis), a mountain in the Canchis Province, Cusco Region, Peru
- Chachakumani (Cochabamba), a mountain in the Cochabamba Department, Bolivia
- Chachakumani (Oruro), a mountain in the Oruro Department, Bolivia
- Chachakumani (Quispicanchi), a mountain in the Quispicanchi Province, Cusco Region, Peru

== See also ==
- Chachakumayuq
