= Kuntur Ikiña (Cochabamba) =

Mountain in Bolivia

- Location within Bolivia

Highest point
- Elevation: 4,533 m (14,872 ft)
- Coordinates: 17°40′05″S 66°49′13″W

Geography
- Location: Bolivia, Cochabamba Department
- Parent range: Andes

Kuntur Ikiña (Aymara kunturi condor, ikiña to sleep, 'where the condor sleeps', also spelled Condor Iquiña) is a 4,533-metre-high (14,872 ft) mountain in the Bolivian Andes. It is located in the Cochabamba Department, Tapacari Province. Kuntur Ikiña lies southwest of Jach'a Ch'utu.
