= Tapacarí Province =

Province in Bolivia

Tapacari
- Province
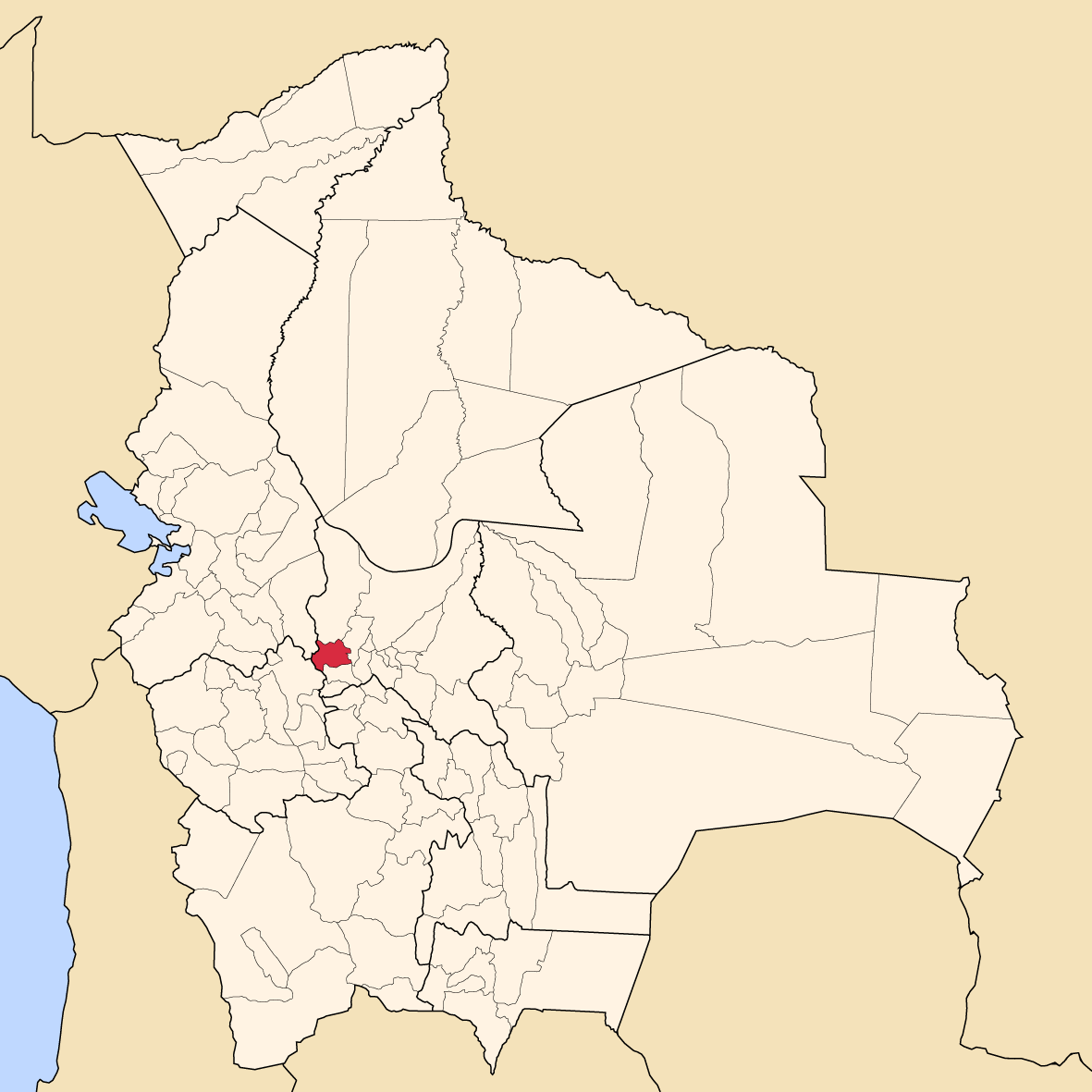
- Location of the Tapacarí Province within Bolivia

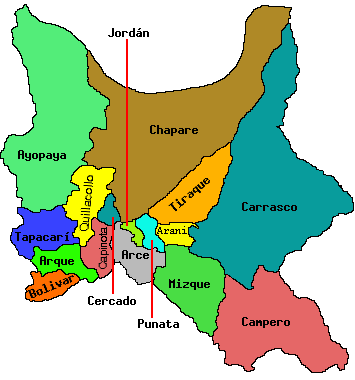
- Provinces of the Cochabamba Department
- Coordinates: 17°37′S 66°05′W
- Country: Bolivia
- Department: Cochabamba Department
- Capital: Tapacari

Area
  - Total: 580 sq mi (1,500 km^{2})
- Elevation: 11,500 ft (3,500 m)

Population (2024 census)
  - Total: 24,534
  - Density: 42/sq mi (16/km^{2})
  - Ethnicities: Quechua Aymara people
- Time zone: UTC-4 (BOT)
- Area code: BO.CB.TP

Tapacarí is a province in the Cochabamba Department, Bolivia. Its capital is Tapacarí. The province is located at a turnoff from the major highway that links Cochabamba and Oruro. It has traditionally been amongst the poorest in the department. Tapacarí Province and neighboring Arque Province are the two poorest of the 16 provinces that make up the department of Cochabamba.

The provincial capital of Tapacarí is the namesake of the 1836 congress that formally made Bolivia a constituent country of the Peru–Bolivian Confederation.

== Geography ==
The approximate elevation of the province is 3,000 metres (9,800 ft) above sea level. The terrain is very rough. Some of the highest mountains of the province are listed below:

- Atuq Wachana
- Chachakumani
- Chullunkhäni
- Chutani
- Itapallu
- Jach'a Ch'utu
- Jach'a Qala
- Jalsuri
- Janq'u Pukara
- Janq'u Qalani
- Kuntur Chukuña
- Kuntur Ikiña
- Llallawa
- Llust'a Q'asa
- Lluxita
- Ñuñu Qullu
- Pichaqani
- Pukara
- Pukara Urqu
- P'iq'iñ Q'ara Punta
- Qalan Qutaña
- Qillqata
- Qutaña
- Q'ara Uyu
- Q'ara Willk'i (Cochabamba)
- Siwinqani
- Suntur Uta
- Tara Qullu
- Turu Qullu
- T'ulani
- T'utura
- Utani Uma
- Warawarani
- Warawarani (near Yuraq Qaqa)
- Waylla Tampu
- Waylluma
- Wichhu Qullu
- Wila Apachita
- Wila Churu
- Wila Jaqhi
- Wisk'achani
- Yana Apachita
- Yaritani
- Yuraq Qaqa

== Subdivision ==
The province is not further subdivided into municipalities. So Tapacarí Municipality and Tapacarí Province are identical. The province is divided into four cantons.

Canton	Inhabitants (2001)	Seat
Challa Canton	6,061	Challa
Leque Canton	3,911	Leque
Ramadas Canton	6,508	Ramadas
Tapacarí Canton	9,429	Tapacarí

== People and economics ==
The majority of the people who live in Tapacarí are indigenous Quechua villagers or campesinos as they are known in Spanish. The principal economic activities of the families are agriculture and livestock, with wheat, barley, potatoes, corn and other staples being the major cash crops and sheep, goats, pigs, and guinea pigs being the most popular animals. Food is first and foremost used for domestic consumption, while the excess is traditionally sold at the local markets. While the men work in agriculture and haul the excess off to larger markets in Quillacollo and Cochabamba, the women of the Tapacari valley are known as superb weavers. The fur from the sheep is removed and dyed with traditional flowers that grow in the wild. and then spun by the women. Finally, in the same fashion that the Incas used centuries ago, it is then extended on the loom to make beautiful products. Although some of the weavings are exported, the majority is sold in the city at centric markets.

Aramasi, which is the site of a weaving center funded via PRODEVAT, in addition to a mill which was funded in part by USAID, is located in Ramadas Canton. The Mary Mahoney Medical Center, which is funded by Asociacion Amistad, also works out of Aramasi. Finally, Aramasi also celebrates an annual weaving and music fair which was started by a US Peace Corps Volunteer.

Politically, the province is almost entirely behind the ruling party of Evo Morales - Movimiento al Socialismo, or MAS.

Ethnic group	Inhabitants (%)
Quechua	64.1
Aymara	31.4
Guaraní, Chiquitos, Moxos	0.0
Not indigenous	4.5
Other indigenous groups	0.0

Ref.: obd.descentralizacion.gov.bo

== Languages ==
The languages spoken in the Tapacarí Province are mainly Quechua, Spanish and Aymara.

Language	Inhabitants
Quechua	18,806
Aymara	8,187
Guaraní	5
Another native	6
Spanish	8,213
Foreign	15
Only native	16,018
Native and Spanish	7,947
Only Spanish	266

== Transport ==
There are virtually no paved roads in the entire province, with the exception of the interdepartamental route linking Cochabamba and Oruro and La Paz.

== See also ==
- Tunari National Park
