= Yuraq Qaqa (Cochabamba) =

Mountain in Bolivia

- Location within Bolivia

Highest point
- Elevation: 4,240 m (13,910 ft)
- Coordinates: 17°25′12″S 66°38′50″W

Geography
- Location: Bolivia, Cochabamba Department
- Parent range: Andes

Yuraq Qaqa (Quechua yuraq white, qaqa rock, "white rock", also spelled Yuraj Khakha) is a mountain in the Bolivian Andes which reaches a height of approximately 4,240 m (13,910 ft). It is located in the Cochabamba Department, Tapacari Province. Yuraq Qaqa lies northwest of Llust'a Q'asa and southeast of Warawarani.

== See also ==
- List of mountains in the Andes
