= Janq'u Pukara =

Mountain in Bolivia

- Location within Bolivia

Highest point
- Elevation: 4,600 m (15,100 ft)
- Coordinates: 17°35′27″S 66°53′55″W

Geography
- Location: Bolivia, Cochabamba Department
- Parent range: Andes

Janq'u Pukara (Aymara janq'u white, pukara fortress, "white fortress", also spelled Janko Pukara) is a mountain in the Bolivian Andes which reaches a height of approximately 4,600 m (15,100 ft). It is located in the Cochabamba Department, Tapacari Province. Janq'u Pukara lies northwest of Ñuñu Qullu.
