= Malibu Lagoon State Beach =

Surfing beach in Malibu, California

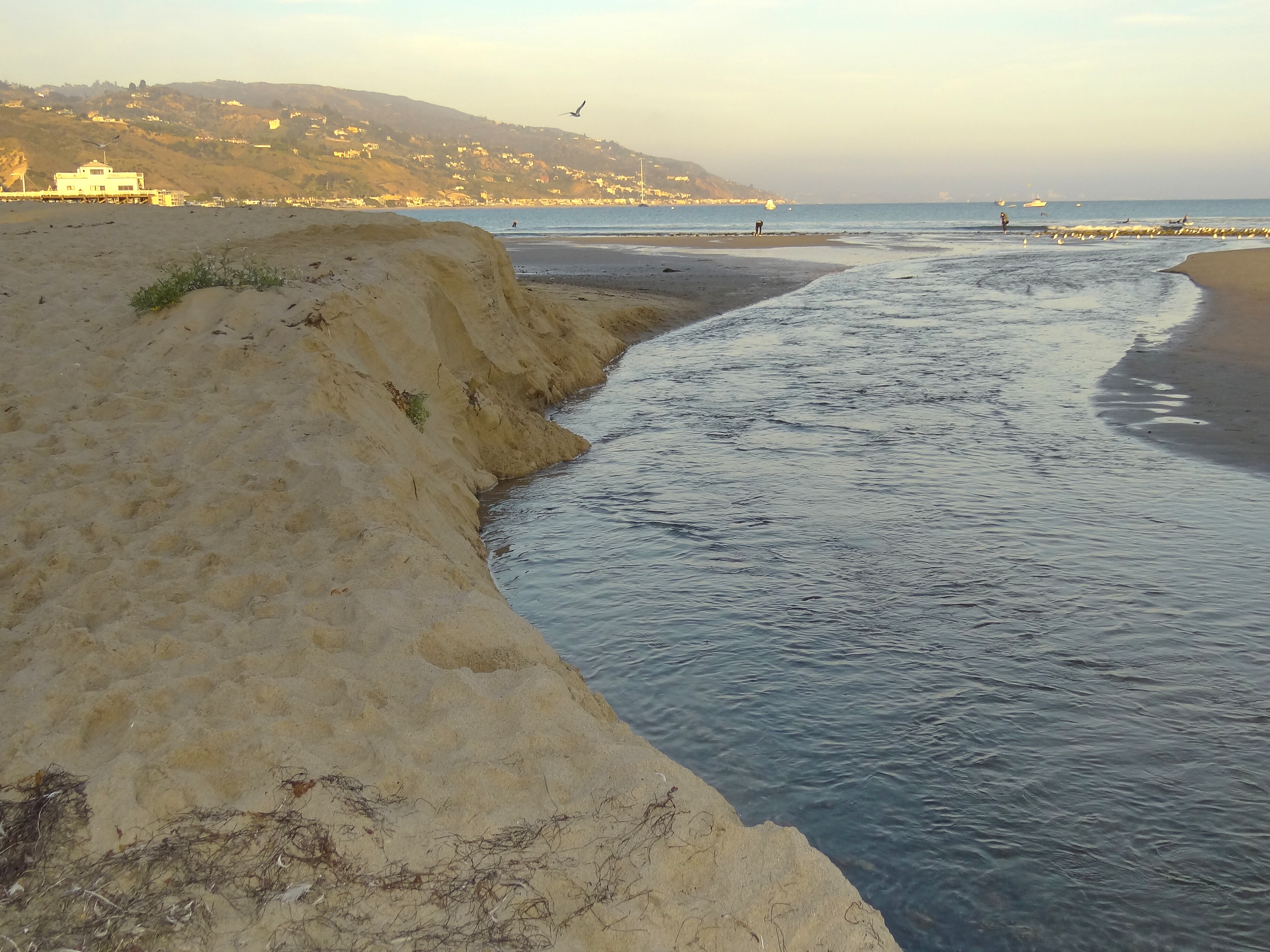

- Location within California Location within the United States
- Location: Los Angeles County, California, United States
- Nearest city: Malibu, California
- Coordinates: 34°2′0″N 118°40′45″W
- Area: 110 acres (45 ha)
- Established: 1951
- Governing body: California Department of Parks and Recreation

Malibu Lagoon State Beach in Malibu, California, United States, is also known as Surfrider Beach. It was dedicated as the first World Surfing Reserve on October 9, 2010. The 110-acre (45 ha) site was established as a California state park in 1951. It lies within the Santa Monica Mountains National Recreation Area.

== Natural history ==
Malibu Lagoon is an estuary at the mouth of Malibu Creek at the Pacific Ocean in Malibu. It is being restored by a multiagency partnership. Migratory birds use the lagoon when on the Pacific Flyway. Snowy Plovers nest on the beach and are protected.

== Surfing ==
Malibu Lagoon is a famous right-break that had a big impact on the surfing culture in Southern California in the 1960s. Located near the Malibu Pier, it is among the most popular surf spots in Los Angeles County. The shoreline is usually triple-cornered due to the buildup of silt, sand, and cobble at the mouth of the creek. The tapering, smooth-breaking waves are recognized among surfers worldwide as the gold standard for summertime "point" surf.

Malibu Lagoon has three primary surfing areas. First Point has waves popular with longboarders and shortboarders during bigger swells. Second Point is used for high performance surfing. It has a main takeoff that lines up and connects into the inside called the "kiddie bowl". Third Point has a left and right side. On the south swells most common in late August and September, surfers can ride all the way to the pier.

== See also ==
- Adamson House
- List of beaches in California
- List of California state parks
  - List of California State Beaches
