= Warawarani (Cochabamba) =

Mountain in Bolivia

- Location within Bolivia

Highest point
- Elevation: 4,425 m (14,518 ft)
- Coordinates: 17°37′19″S 66°47′26″W

Geography
- Location: Bolivia, Cochabamba Department
- Parent range: Andes

Warawarani (Aymara warawara star, -ni a suffix, "the one with a star", also spelled Wara Warani) is a 4,425-metre-high (14,518 ft) mountain in the Bolivian Andes. It is located in the Cochabamba Department, Tapacari Province. Warawarani lies west of Sapanani and northeast of Turu Qullu. The northern peak of Warawarani (also spelled Huara Huarani) reaches a height of 4,250 m (13,940 ft). It lies at 17°36′29″S 66°47′34″W.
