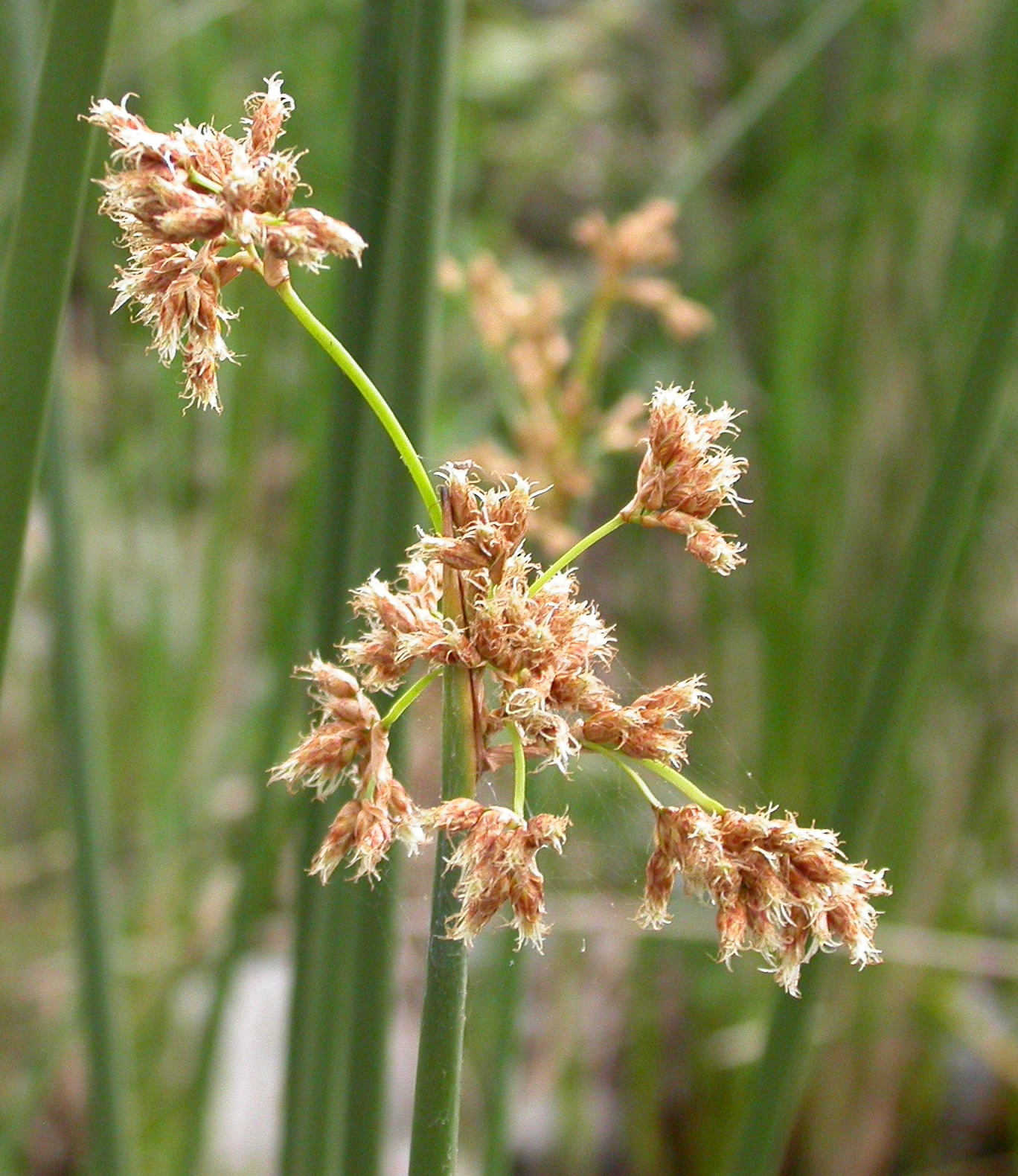
- Inflorescence

Conservation status
- Secure (NatureServe)

Scientific classification
- Kingdom: Plantae
- Clade: Tracheophytes
- Clade: Angiosperms
- Clade: Monocots
- Clade: Commelinids
- Order: Poales
- Family: Cyperaceae
- Genus: Schoenoplectus
- Species: S. californicus

Binomial name
- Schoenoplectus californicus (C.A. Mey.) Steud.

Synonyms
- Dichromena atrosanguinea; Elytrospermum californicum; Malacochaete assimilis; Malacochaete chilense; Malacochaete oligostachya; Malacochaete riparia; Malacochaete sanguinolenta; Malacochaete tatora; Schoenoplectus chamissoi; Schoenoplectus pseudotriqueter; Schoenoplectus riparius; Schoenoplectus tatora; Scirpus californicus; Scirpus chamissoi; Scirpus decipiens; Scirpus pseudotriqueter; Scirpus rigidus; Scirpus tereticulmis

= Schoenoplectus californicus =

Schoenoplectus californicus California bulrush

Species of grass-like plant

Schoeneoplectus californicus is a species of sedge known by the common names California bulrush, southern bulrush and giant bulrush. It is also sometimes called "tule", but the closely related Schoenoplectus acutus is the species most often referred to by that name.

== Description ==
Schoenoplectus californicus is a rhizomed water plant found in marshy areas. It is native to the southern and western United States as well as Mexico, Central America, South America, Easter Island, and the Falkland Islands. It is naturalized on some Pacific islands including New Zealand, Hawaii and the Cook Islands. It has tall, thin, dark green stems which are usually triangular in cross-section and woolly, bristly tan or brown flowers in panicle inflorescences.

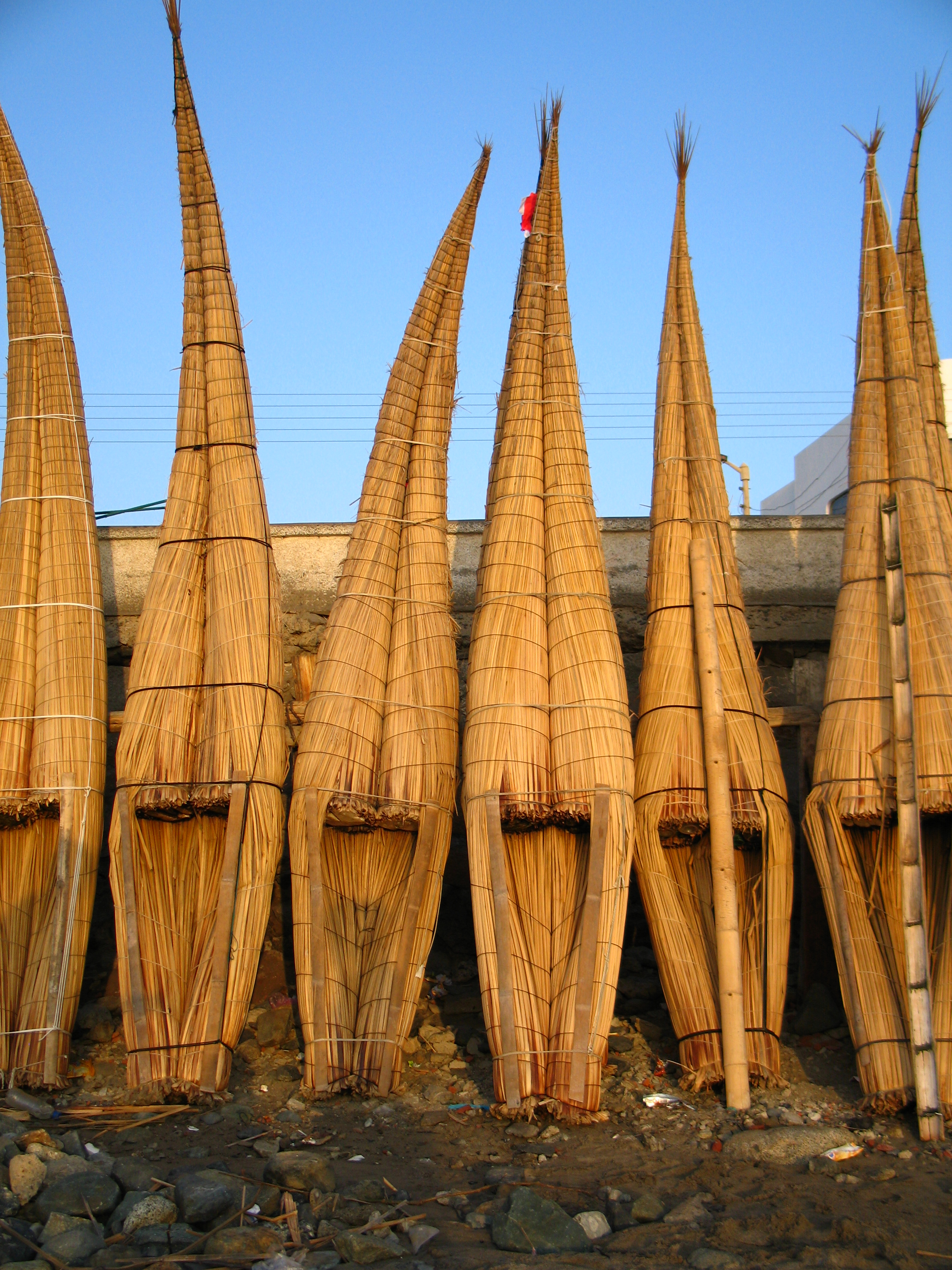
Caballos de Totora in Huanchaco Peru

== Uses ==
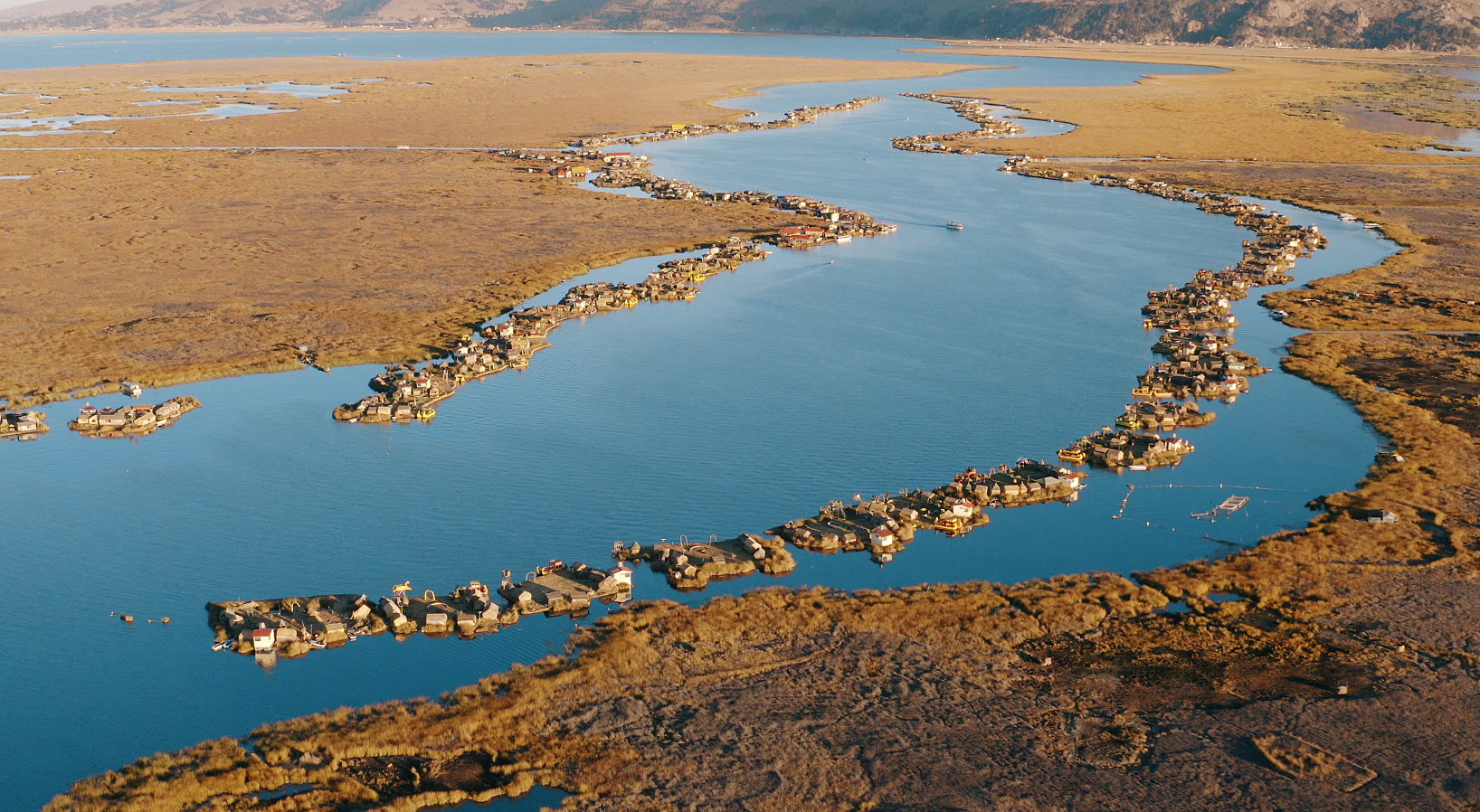
Totora made artificial floating island communities of the Uru peoples in Lake Titicaca

A notable subspecies is the totora, Schoenoplectus californicus subsp. tatora. This is famous for making up the floating islands on which the Uros people of Lake Titicaca dwell, as well as occurring on isolated Easter Island in the Pacific.

Boats have also been made from this plant by many cultures, including the Caballito de totora in Peru for over 3,000 years. The plants are still farmed in wetlands next to the sea for the boats, and there is also an ecological reserve that specifically protects these sedge farms called the Swamps of Huanchaco.
