= P'iq'iñ Q'ara Punta =

Mountain in Bolivia

- Location within Bolivia

Highest point
- Elevation: 4,551 m (14,931 ft)
- Coordinates: 17°33′51″S 66°50′44″W

Geography
- Location: Bolivia, Cochabamba Department
- Parent range: Andes

P'iq'iñ Q'ara Punta (Aymara p'iq'iña head, q'ara bare, bald, p'iq'iña q'ara bald, also spelled Pheken Khara Punta) is a 4,551-metre-high (14,931 ft) mountain in the Bolivian Andes. It is located in the Cochabamba Department, Tapacari Province. P'iq'iñ Q'ara Punta lies west of the village of Machaqa Marka (Machacamarca).
