= Q'ara Willk'i (Cochabamba) =

Mountain in Bolivia

- Location within Bolivia

Highest point
- Elevation: 4,568 m (14,987 ft)
- Coordinates: 17°41′31″S 66°52′17″W

Geography
- Location: Bolivia, Cochabamba Department
- Parent range: Andes

Q'ara Willk'i (Aymara q'ara bald, bare, willk'i gap, "bald gap", also spelled Khara Willkhi) is a 4,568-metre-high (14,987 ft) mountain in the Bolivian Andes. It is located in the Cochabamba Department, Tapacari Province. Q'ara Willk'i lies northwest of Lluxita.
