= Wichhu Qullu (Cochabamba) =

Mountain in Bolivia

- Location within Bolivia

Highest point
- Elevation: 3,840 m (12,600 ft)
- Coordinates: 17°27′35″S 66°37′58″W

Geography
- Location: Bolivia, Cochabamba Department
- Parent range: Andes

Wichhu Qullu (Aymara jichu, wichhu stipa ichu, qullu mountain, "ichu mountain", also spelled Huichu Kkollu) is a mountain in the Bolivian Andes which reaches a height of approximately 3,840 m (12,600 ft). It is located in the Cochabamba Department, Tapacari Province. Wichhu Qullu lies west of the Ch'iyar Jaqhi River and north of the village of Ch'iyar Jaqhi ("black rock", also spelled Chiaraque).
