= Qillqata (Tapacarí) =

Mountain in Bolivia

- Location within Bolivia

Highest point
- Elevation: 4,210 m (13,810 ft)
- Coordinates: 17°36′12″S 66°46′39″W

Geography
- Location: Bolivia, Cochabamba Department
- Parent range: Andes

Qillqata (Aymara qillqaña to write, -ta a suffix, "written" or "something written", also spelled Killkata) is a 4,210-metre-high (13,810 ft) mountain in the Bolivian Andes. It is located in the Cochabamba Department, Tapacari Province. Qillqata lies between the Tallija River and the Ch'amak Uma ("dark water", Chamaj Uma).
