= Wila Apachita =

Mountain in Bolivia

- Location within Bolivia

Highest point
- Elevation: 4,595 m (15,075 ft)
- Coordinates: 17°36′16″S 66°52′56″W

Geography
- Location: Bolivia, Cochabamba Department
- Parent range: Andes

Wila Apachita (Aymara wila blood, blood-red, apachita the place of transit of an important pass in the principal routes of the Andes; name in the Andes for a stone cairn built along the trail in the high mountains, "red apachita", also spelled Huila Apacheta, Wila Apacheta) is a 4,595-metre-high (15,075 ft) mountain in the Bolivian Andes. It is located in the Cochabamba Department, Tapacari Province. Wila Apachita lies southeast of Ñuñu Qullu.
