= Huanchaco =

Popular seaside resort town in the city of Trujillo, Peru

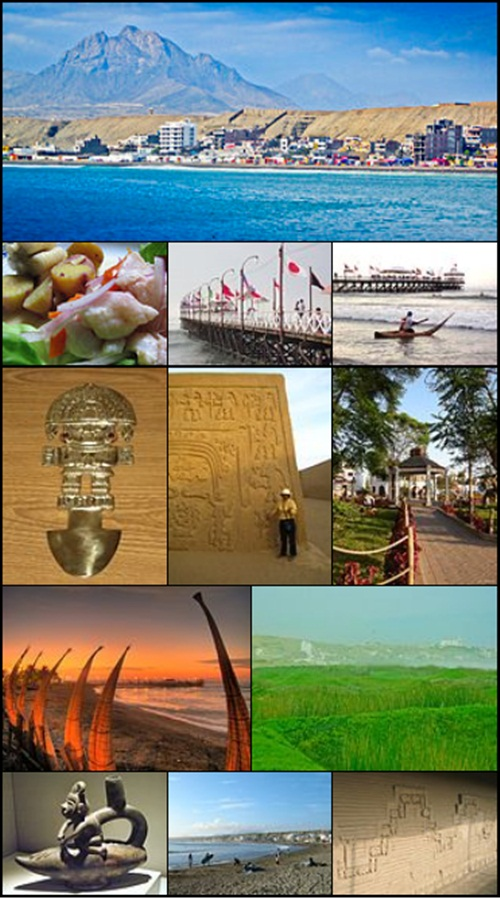
- From top and left to right: View of Huanchaco beach, Dish of cebiche, Huanchaco pier, Saveguard in Caballito de Totora, Tumi: Chimu work, Chan Chan: Chimu capital, Park in Huanchaco, Night view of the pier, Swamps of Huanchaco, Navegator Chimu in a Caballito de Totora, Surfers in Huanchaco, Wall in Chan Chan

- Location within Peru
- Coordinates: 7°42.0′S 79°26.0′W
- Country: Peru
- Region: La Libertad Region
- Province: Trujillo
- District: Huanchaco
- Established: Mochica in Pre-Columbian era Spanish: January 1, 1535 by fray Alonso de Escarcena and Juan de Barbaran.

Government
  - Mayor: Jose Ruiz Vega (2019-2022)
- Elevation: 13 m (43 ft)

Population (2017)
  - Urban: 71,379
  - Demonym: huanchaquino(a) huanchaqueño(a)
- Time zone: UTC-5 (PET)
- Website: Municipality of Huanchaco

Huanchaco is a popular seaside resort city in province of Trujillo, Peru. Huanchaco is known for its surf breaks, its caballitos de totora and its ceviche, and is near the ancient ruins of Chan Chan. Huanchaco was approved as a World Surfing Reserve by the organization Save The Waves Coalition in 2012 This historic town is part of the tourist circuit called the "Moche Route" or "Ruta Moche".

Scientific research on the maritime culture of Huanchaco has been conducted and published by American anthropologist Ricardo Sabogal-Suji, Ph.D.

Dr. Ricardo Sabogal-Suji has investigated the significance of Huanchaco's historical, cultural, and touristic value.

== History ==
=== Pre-Columbian era ===
Huanchaco's original population were indigenous fishermen, who worshipped the moon and a golden fish called Huaca Taska. Some accounts suggest the name "Huanchaco" originate from "Gua-Kocha, a Quechua word meaning "beautiful lake". During the period of the Chimú culture, 800 to 1400, Huanchaco was the port for Chan Chan, which was established 4 km away. It was also the main port during Moche period, and was described by Inca Garcilaso de la Vega as the preferred port of the Incas.

=== Colonial era ===
Following the Spanish conquest of 1534, the Spanish town was founded as "Huanchaco" on January 1, 1535, by the Franciscan friar Alonso of Escarcena and Juan de Barbaran.

Subsequently, Huanchaco functioned as the main port of Trujillo city, but the port closed in 1870. Two decades later Victor Larco Herrera rebuilt the pier exclusively for exporting sugar from businesses in the neighbouring Chicama valley, one of the most important areas of sugar production in the country.

== Archaeology ==
The area near Huanchaco was the site of a large-scale Chimú sacrificial event at Huanchaquito-Las Llamas involving more than 140 children and 200 llamas, making it the largest known mass child sacrifice identified in the archaeological record.

Most of the children were between five and fourteen years old. Analysis of the remains indicated that the children came from different regions rather than a single local population. Many of the skeletons showed cut marks on the breastbone and ribs, indicating that the chest had been opened as part of the ritual. Red pigment was found on some of the children's faces. Similar evidence was found among the associated llama burials.

Footprints preserved in mud recorded the movement of children, adults, and llamas toward the sacrificial area. Archaeologists also found evidence of unusually wet conditions at the site. The researchers noted that the sacrifice took place after a period of heavy rainfall on Peru's normally arid north coast.

== Origin of Ceviche ==
According to Andrés Tinoco Rondan, an academic researcher at Ricardo Palma University, Huanchaco is the birthplace of the seafood dish ceviche. Oral histories suggest ceviche was prepared with lemons from Simbal (yunga village nearby), with chilli from the Moche River valley and seaweed extracted from the sea.

In Huanchaco the ceviche is often served to tourists with the seaweed called cochayuyo or mococho which is taken from the shores of Huanchaco

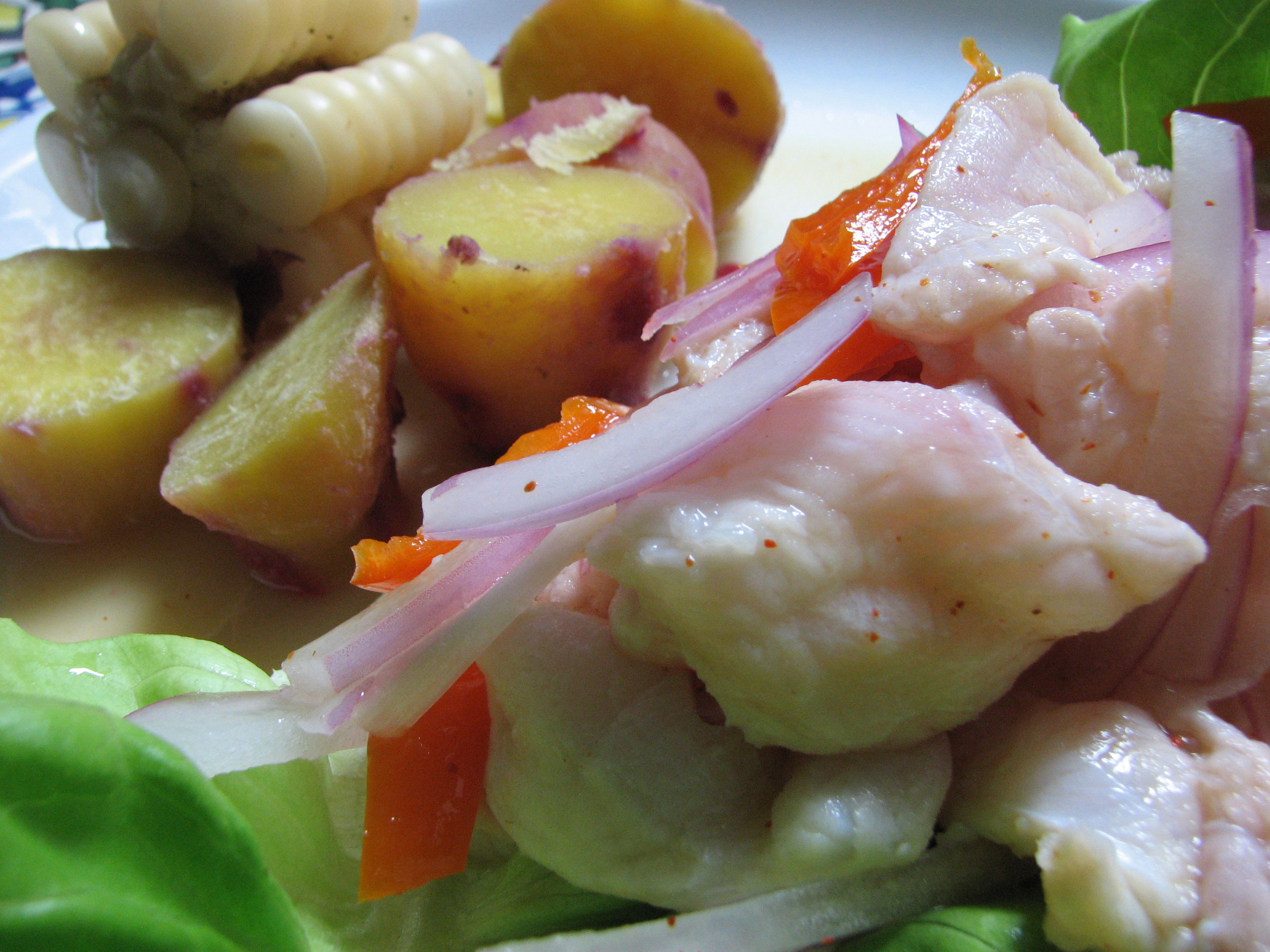
Typical dish of ceviche in Huanchaco,
National Cultural Heritage by the Peruvian government

== Tourism ==
Huanchaco is visited by foreign tourists, particularly surfers. Several surf events are held and one of the most important each year in January is the Huanchaco longboard. Other nearby attractions include Chan Chan, Mount Campana, a sacred mountain in the Chimu culture and Pampas de Gramalote, a complex for shamanic experiences.

=== Surfing ===
In 2012 Huanchaco obtained approval as a World Surfing Reserve by the organization Save The Waves Coalition. This designation is the first awarded to a Latin America town and the fifth in the world. Huanchaco is notable not only for consistent, smooth waves, but also for being the birthplace of the Caballito de totora boat which is regarded as one of the first known surf crafts. Huanchaco's beaches offer smooth and consistent waves, as it is very exposed to all swells.

The Huanchaco Longboard World Championships is a surfing competition that has taken place since 2010 at the El Elio Beach in Huanchaco, and brings together leading surfers of several countries of the world.

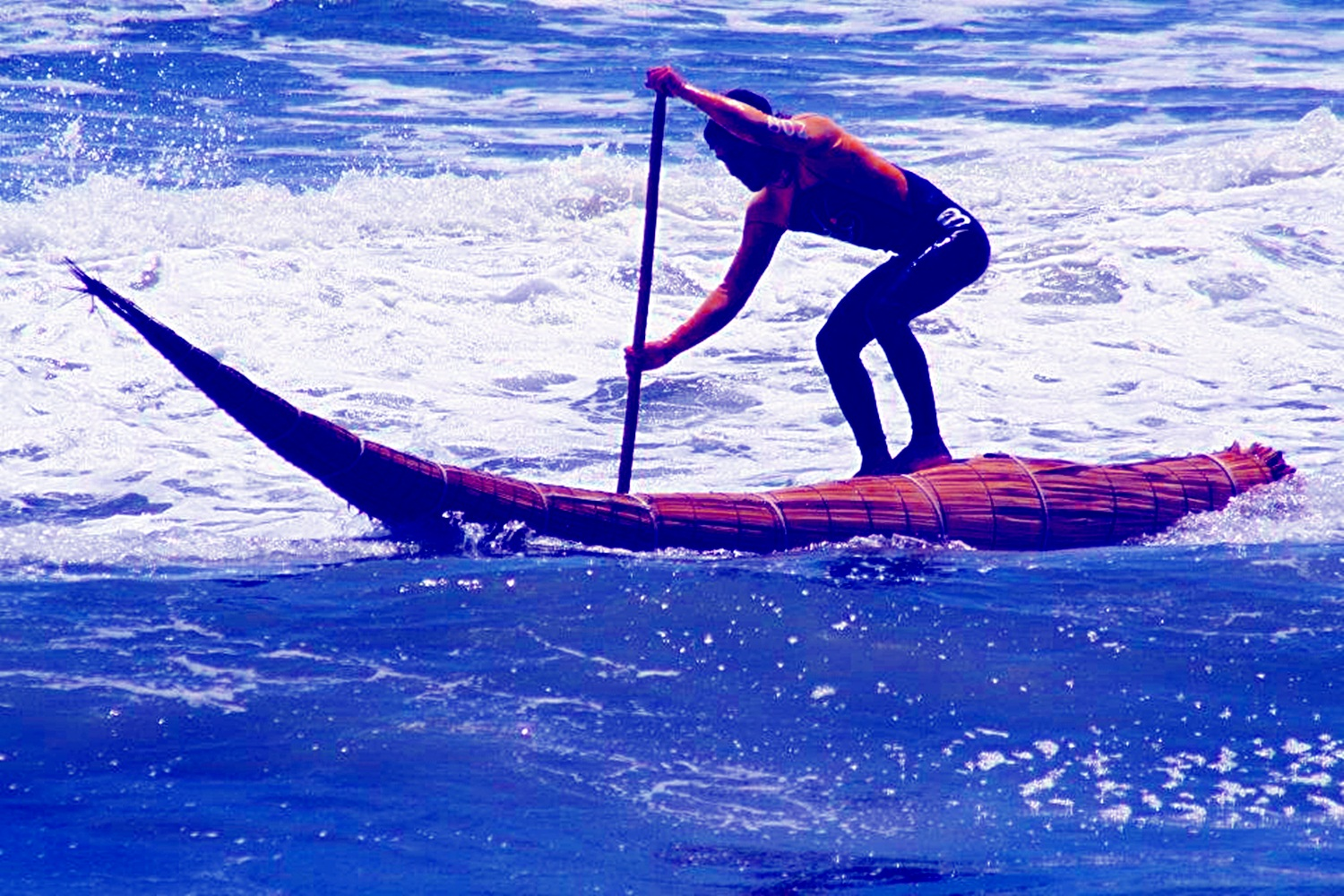
Surfing in a caballito de totora in Huanchaco

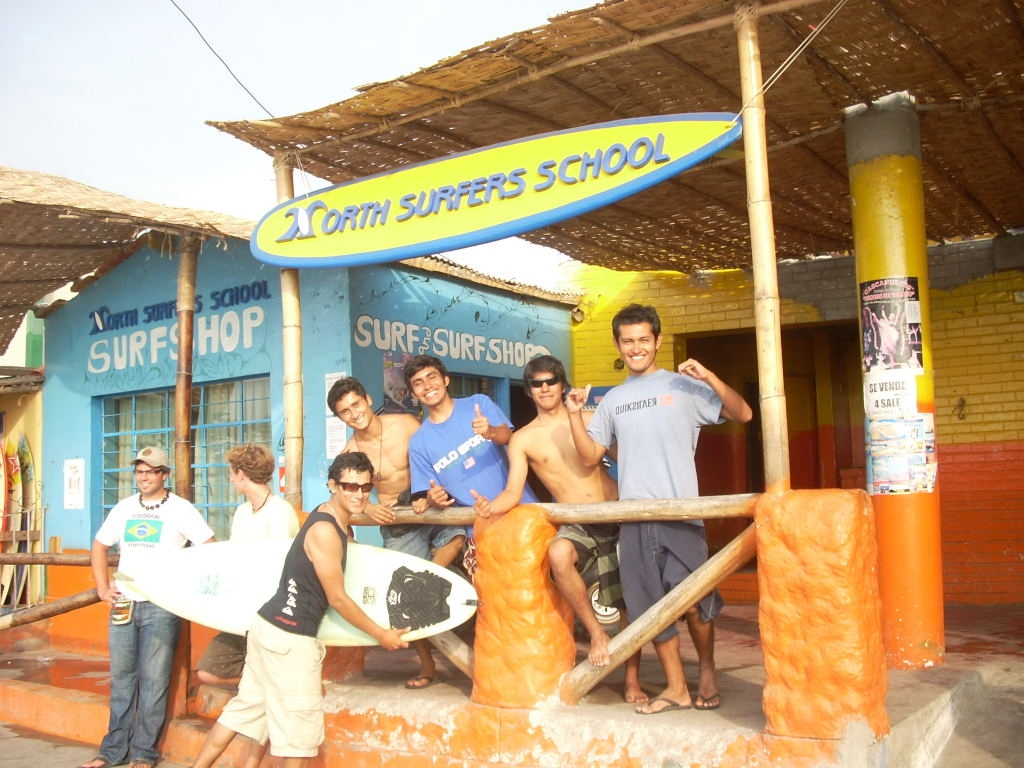
A group of surfers in Huanchaco

=== Sandboarding ===
The sand dunes near the town of Laredo, close to Trujillo are a popular destination for sandboarding.

Huanchaco beach tourist attractions
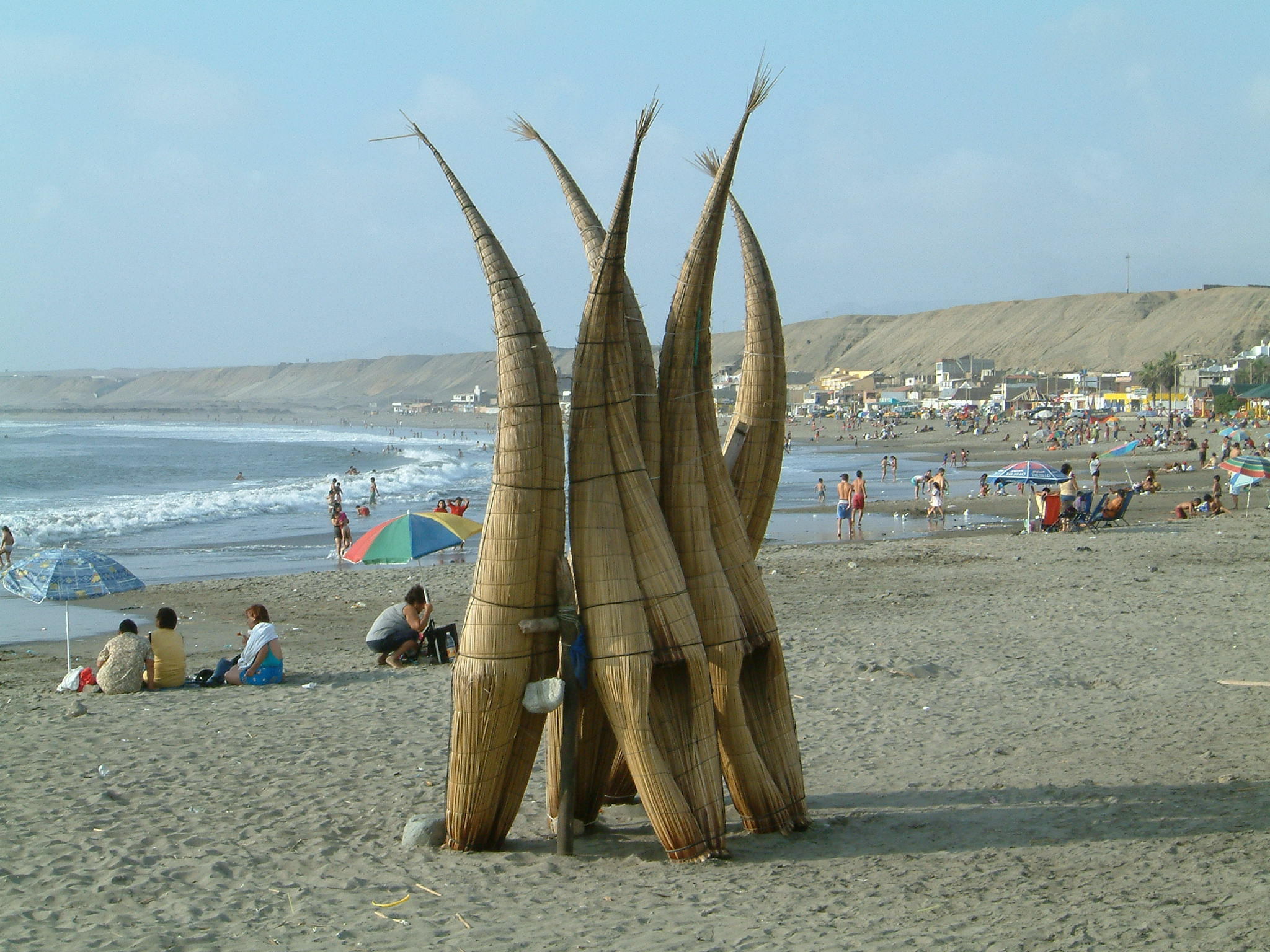
Huanchaco beach
surfer's paradise

La Ribera avenue at Huanchaco

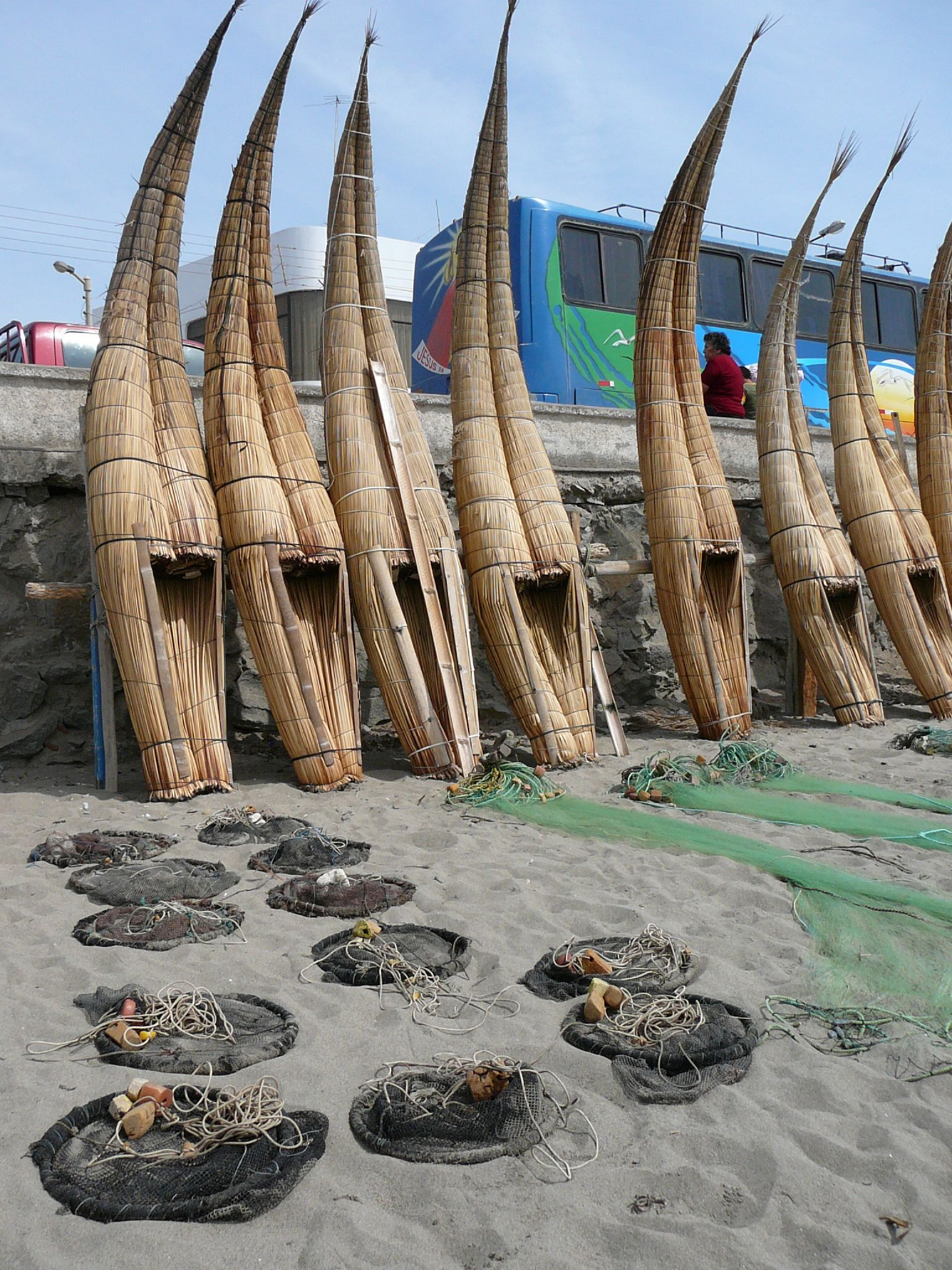
Peruvian fishing boats
It shows the typical and ancient
caballitos de totora

Malecon near to the beach

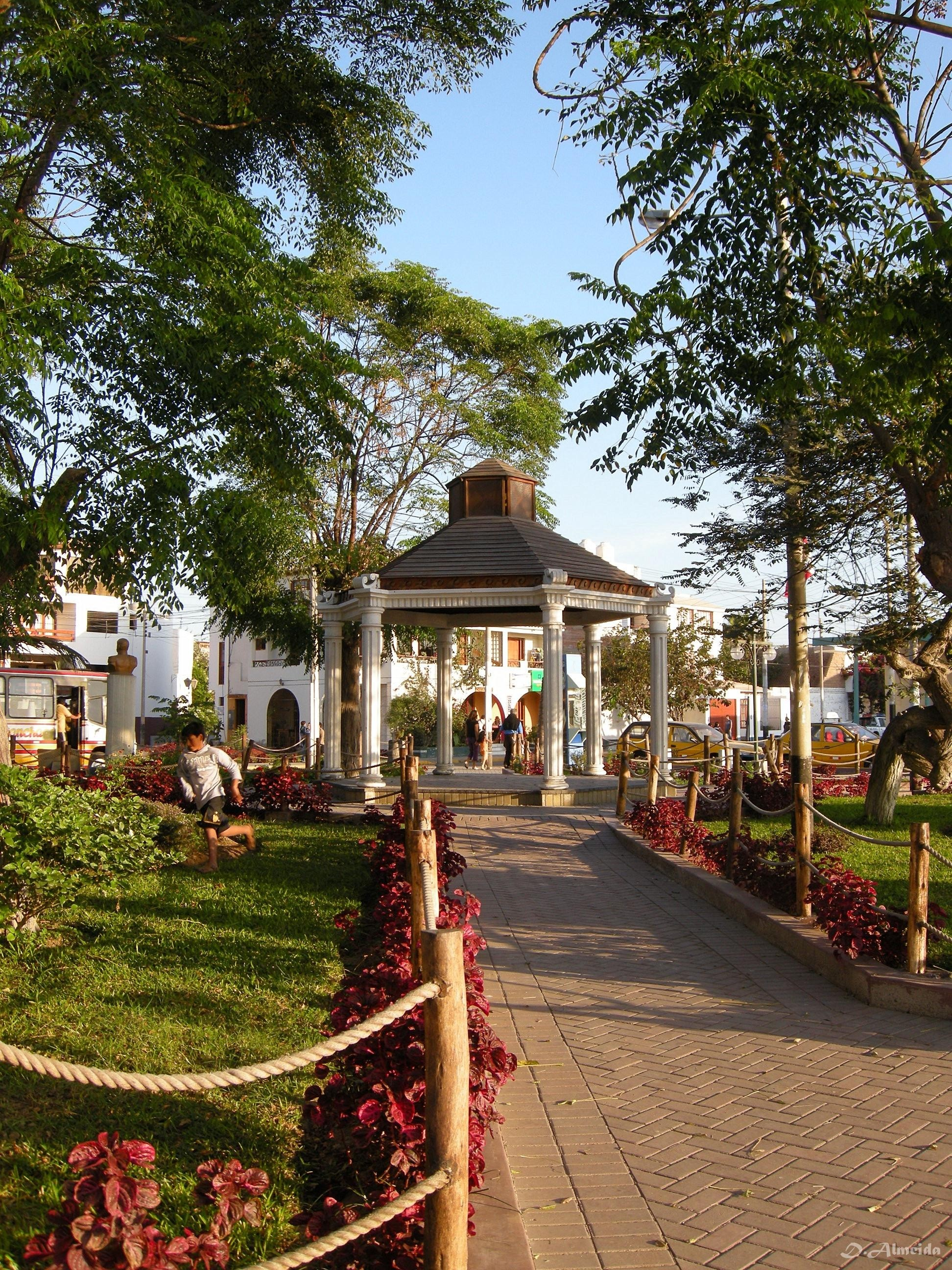
Park in Huanchaco

== Swamps of Huanchaco ==
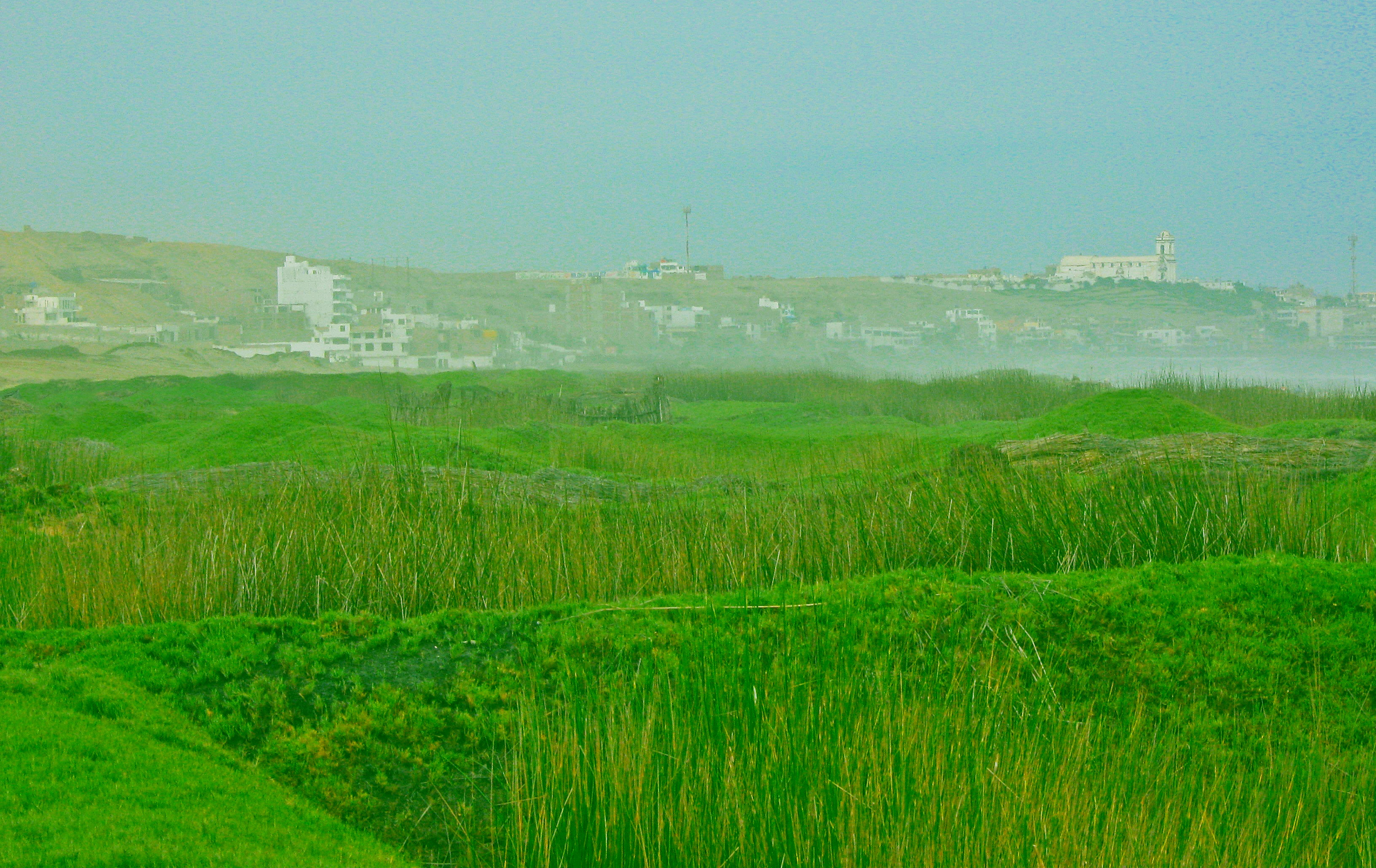
Swamps of Huanchaco is an ecological Chimu reserve, about 14 km northwest of the historic center of Trujillo city, Peru. From this ecological reserve, the ancient mochica extracted the raw material for the manufacture of the ancient Caballitos de totora used since the time of the Moche for fishing.

Swamps of Huanchaco, also known as Wetlands of Huanchaco is an ecological Chimu reserve located in Huanchaco Beach, about 14 km northwest of Trujillo city, Peru. From this ecological reserve the ancient mochica extracted the raw material for the manufacture of the ancient Caballitos de totora used since the time of the Moche for fishing. Currently Huanchaco fishermen still use materials from these swamps to make the traditional boats

== Festivals ==
- Carnival of Huanchaco, this carnival has been held since the beginning of the 20th century. Originally villagers performed a carnival emulating the famous Venetian Carnival of the time. Later it became organized by the Club Huanchaco, and now consists of several activities including the crowning of the queen, surf contest, luau party, creativity in the sand, championships of Caballito de totora, and the carnival parade among. In 2012 the carnival parade was held on 25 February.
- San Pedro, the patron saint of fishermen at sea, is also called "San Pedrito"; in Huanchaco it is made a traditional "Patacho" which is a giant reed horse. It is celebrated in the month of June.

== In popular culture ==
- The town is mentioned in The Swarm, a novel by Frank Schätzing. A fisherman from the town and his experience served as the opening prologue for the novel.

== See also ==
- Buenos Aires
- Chan Chan
- Puerto Chicama
- Chimu
- Historic Centre of Trujillo
- La Libertad Region
- Lake Conache
- Las Delicias beach
- Marcahuamachuco
- Moche
- Pacasmayo beach
- Puerto Morín
- Salaverry
- San Jose Festival
- Marinera Festival
- Trujillo Province, Peru
- Trujillo Spring Festival
- Trujillo
- Víctor Larco Herrera District
- Virú culture
- Vista Alegre
- Wetlands of Huanchaco
- Wiraquchapampa
