= Kuntur Chukuña (Cochabamba) =

Mountain in Bolivia

- Location within Bolivia

Highest point
- Elevation: 4,208 m (13,806 ft)
- Coordinates: 17°23′26″S 66°35′44″W

Geography
- Location: Bolivia, Cochabamba Department
- Parent range: Andes

Kuntur Chukuña (Aymara kunturi condor, chukuña to squat, to cower, 'where the condor squats', also spelled Condor Chucuna) is a 4,208-metre-high (13,806 ft) mountain in the Bolivian Andes. It is located in the Cochabamba Department, Tapacari Province.
