= Warawarani (Yuraq Qaqa) =

Mountain in Bolivia

- Location within Bolivia

Highest point
- Elevation: 4,314 m (14,154 ft)
- Coordinates: 17°24′49″S 66°39′35″W

Geography
- Location: Bolivia, Cochabamba Department
- Parent range: Andes

Warawarani (Aymara warawara star, -ni a suffix, "the one with a star", also spelled Wara Warani) is a 4,314-metre-high (14,154 ft) mountain in the Bolivian Andes. It is located in the Cochabamba Department, in the northern part of the Tapacari Province. Warawarani lies northwest of Yuraq Qaqa.
