= Jach'a Ch'utu =

Mountain in Bolivia

- Location within Bolivia

Highest point
- Elevation: 4,191 m (13,750 ft)
- Coordinates: 17°38′28″S 66°48′12″W

Geography
- Location: Bolivia, Cochabamba Department
- Parent range: Andes

Jach'a Ch'utu (Aymara jach'a big, ch'utu peak of a mountain, top of the head, "big peak", also spelled Jacha Chuto, Jachcha Chuto) is a 4,191-metre-high (13,750 ft) mountain in the Bolivian Andes. It is located in the Cochabamba Department, Tapacari Province. Jach'a Ch'utu lies southeast of Siwinqani and Turu Qullu.
