= Wila Jaqhi (Bolivia) =

Mountain in Bolivia

- Location within Bolivia

Highest point
- Elevation: 4,114 m (13,497 ft)
- Coordinates: 17°32′29″S 66°48′04″W

Geography
- Location: Bolivia, Cochabamba Department
- Parent range: Andes

Wila Jaqhi (Aymara wila blood, blood-red, jaqhi precipice, cliff, "red cliff", also spelled Huila Jakke, Wila Jakke) is a 4,114-metre-high (13,497 ft) mountain in the Bolivian Andes. It is located in the Cochabamba Department, Tapacari Province. Wila Jaqhi lies northeast of the village of Machaqa Marka (Machacamarca).
