= Ñuñu Qullu (Cochabamba) =

Mountain in Bolivia

- Location within Bolivia

Highest point
- Elevation: 4,589 m (15,056 ft)
- Coordinates: 17°35′50″S 66°53′24″W

Geography
- Location: Bolivia, Cochabamba Department
- Parent range: Andes

Ñuñu Qullu (Aymara ñuñu breast, qullu mountain, "breast mountain", also spelled Ñuñu Kollu) is a 4,589-metre-high (15,056 ft) mountain in the Bolivian Andes. It is located in the Cochabamba Department, Tapacari Province. Ñuñu Qullu lies between Wila Apachita in the southeast and Janq'u Pukara in the northwest.
