= Turu Qullu =

Mountain in Bolivia

- Location within Bolivia

Highest point
- Elevation: 4,309 m (14,137 ft)
- Coordinates: 17°37′59″S 66°48′40″W

Geography
- Location: Bolivia, Cochabamba Department
- Parent range: Andes

Turu Qullu (Aymara turu blunt, qullu mountain, "blunt mountain", also spelled Turu Kkollu) is a 4,309-metre-high (14,137 ft) mountain in the Bolivian Andes. It is located in the Cochabamba Department, Tapacari Province. Turu Qullu lies northwest of Jach'a Ch'utu.
