= Llust'a Q'asa =

Mountain in Bolivia

- Location within Bolivia

Highest point
- Elevation: 4,182 m (13,720 ft)
- Coordinates: 17°25′29″S 66°38′05″W

Geography
- Location: Bolivia, Cochabamba Department
- Parent range: Andes

Llust'a Q'asa (Quechua llust'a slippery, q'asa mountain pass, "slippery mountain pass", also spelled Llusta Khasa) is a 4,182-metre-high (13,720 ft) mountain in the Bolivian Andes. It is located in the Cochabamba Department, Tapacari Province.
