= Lluxita (Cochabamba) =

Mountain in Bolivia

- Location within Bolivia

Highest point
- Elevation: 4,606 m (15,112 ft)
- Coordinates: 17°42′19″S 66°51′40″W

Geography
- Location: Bolivia, Cochabamba Department
- Parent range: Andes

Lluxita (Aymara lluxi shell of a mussel; landslide, -ta a suffix, also spelled Llojeta) is a 4,606-metre-high (15,112 ft) mountain in the Bolivian Andes. It is located in the Cochabamba Department, Tapacari Province. Lluxita lies southeast of Q'ara Willk'i.
