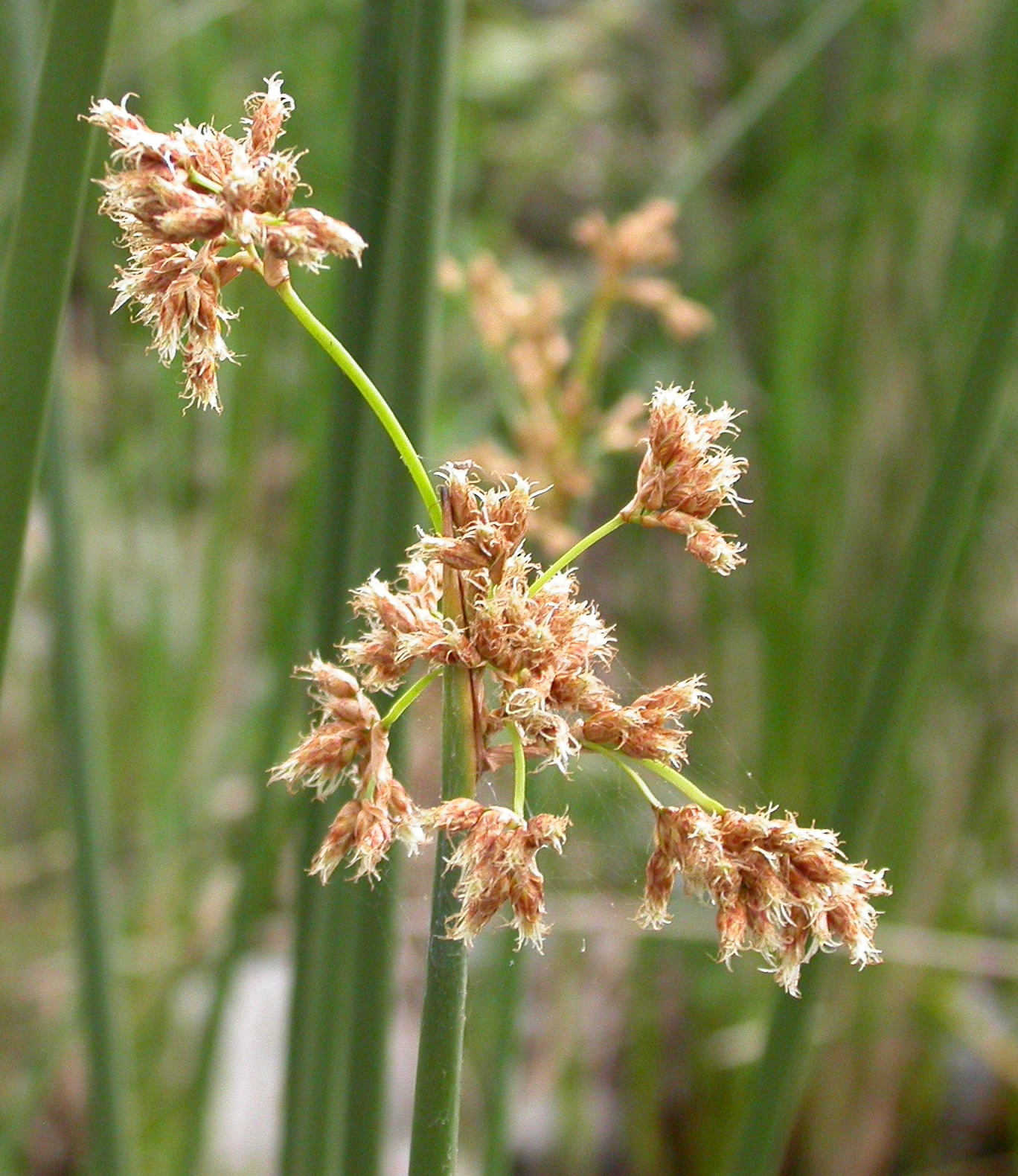
- Totora flower

Scientific classification
- Kingdom: Plantae
- Clade: Embryophytes
- Clade: Tracheophytes
- Clade: Angiosperms
- Clade: Monocots
- Clade: Commelinids
- Order: Poales
- Family: Cyperaceae
- Genus: Schoenoplectus
- Species: S. californicus
- Subspecies: S. c. subsp. tatora

Trinomial name
- Schoenoplectus californicus subsp. tatora

Synonyms
- Malacochaete tatora; Schoenoplectus tatora; Schoenoplectus totora (lapsus)

= Totora (plant) =

Species of plant

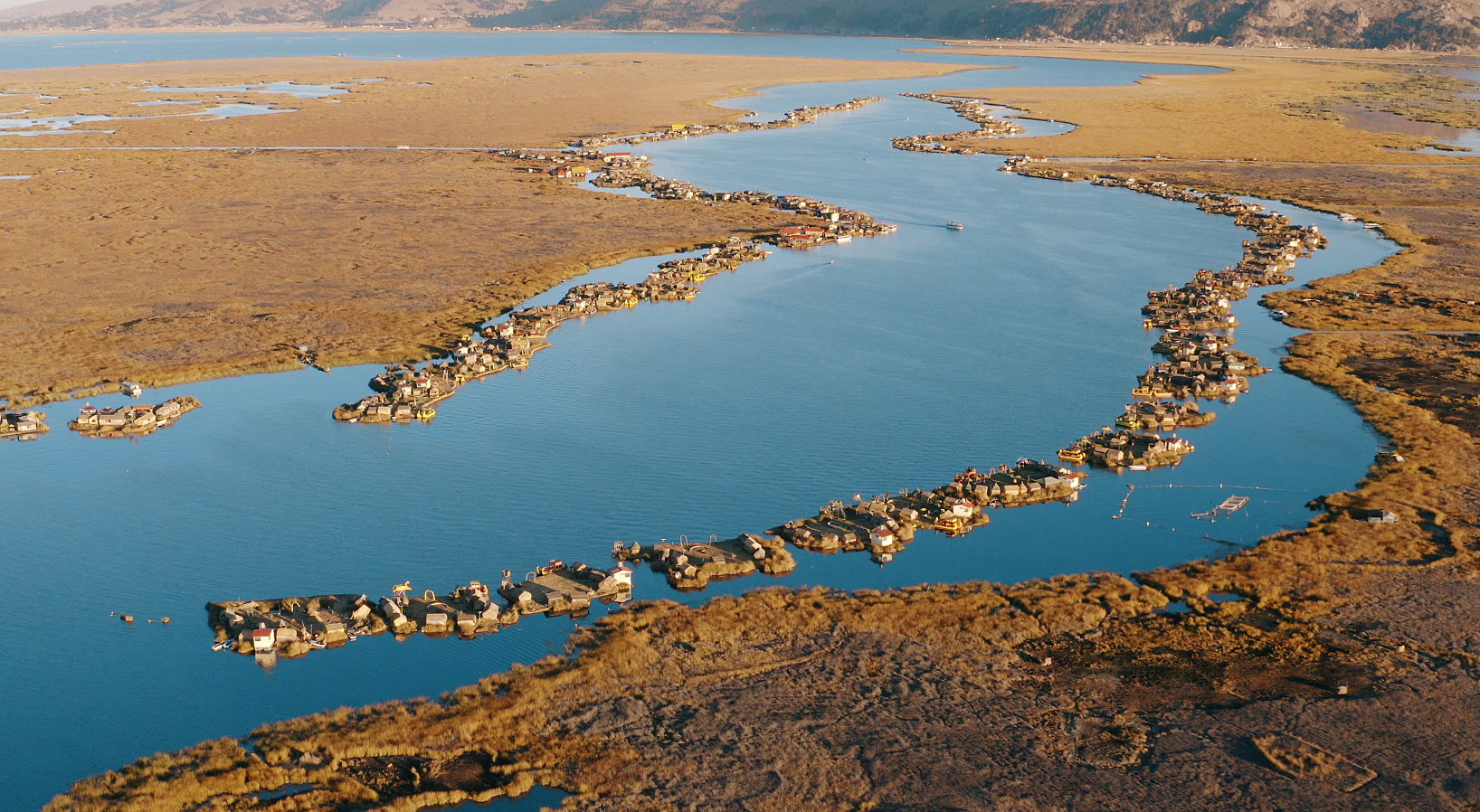
Totora made artificial floating islands of the Uru peoples, as traditional settlements, in Lake Titicaca where Totora grows

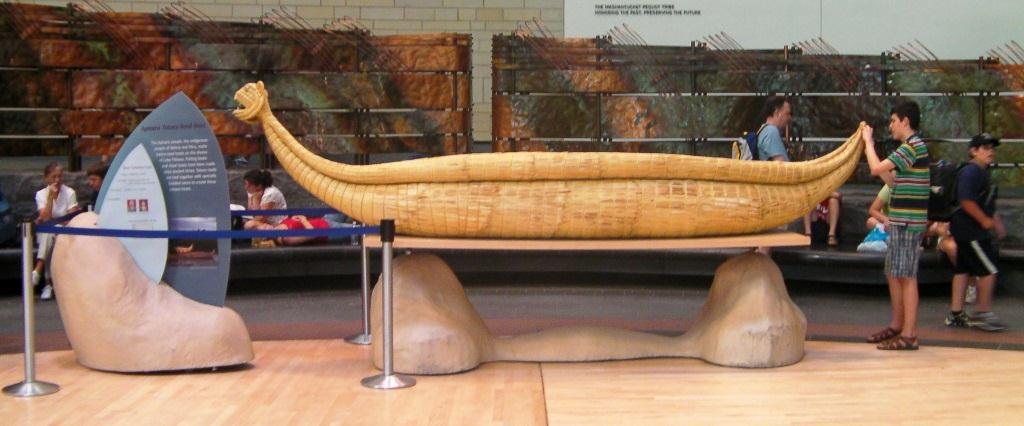
Aymara Totora Reed Boat on display at the Smithsonian, Washington, DC

Totora (Schoenoplectus californicus subsp. tatora) is a subspecies of the giant bulrush sedge. It is found in South America, notably on Lake Titicaca, the middle coast of Peru and on Easter Island in the Pacific Ocean. The genus Schoenoplectus is closely related to Scirpus and sometimes included therein. This plant can reach a height of 6 m (20 ft) and commonly reaches 4 m (13 ft). The word totora comes from the Quechua language.

The people of the mid-coast region of Peru have used totora to build their caballitos de totora, small rowed and straddled fishing vessels, for at least 3,000 years. The Uru people, an indigenous people predating the Inca civilisation, live on Lake Titicaca upon floating islands fashioned from this plant. The Uru people also use the totora plant to make boats (balsas) of the bundled dried plant reeds. In Titicaca, it commonly grows at a water depth of 2.5–3 m (8.2–9.8 ft) but occurs less frequently as deep as 5.5 m (18 ft).

The Rapa Nui people of Easter Island used totora reeds – locally known as nga'atu – for thatching and to make pora (swimming aids). These are used for recreation, and were formerly employed by hopu (clan champions) to reach offshore Motu Nui in the tangata manu (bird-man) competition. How the plant arrived on the island is not clear; Thor Heyerdahl argued that it had been brought by prehistoric Peruvians, but it is at least as likely to have been brought by birds. Recent work indicates that totora has been growing on Easter Island for at least 30,000 years, which is well before humans arrived on the island.
