= Caballito de totora =

Typical boat from Peru

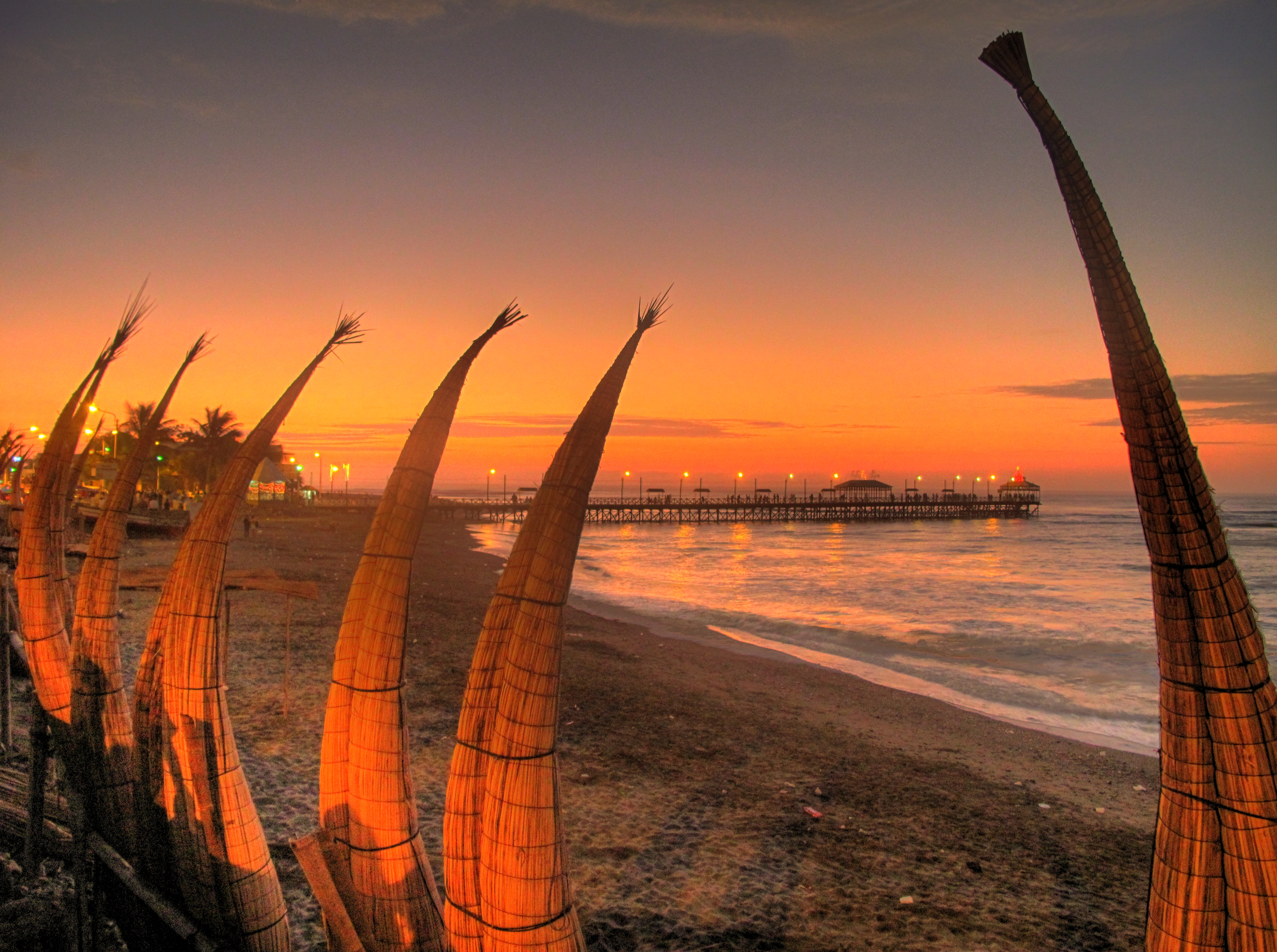
Caballitos de totora in Huanchaco beach.

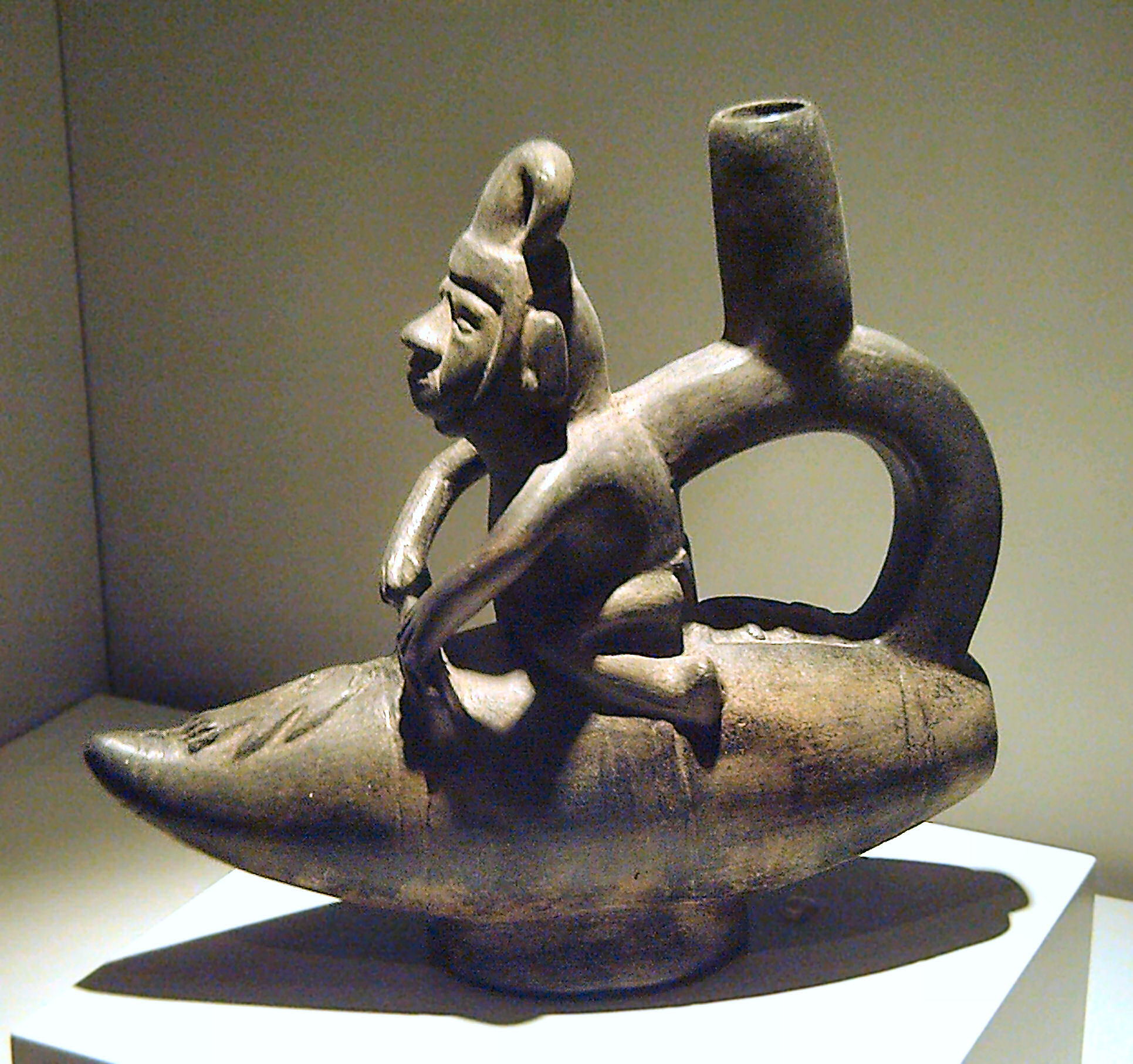
Chimú vessel representing a fisherman on a caballito de totora (1100–1400 CE)

Caballitos de totora are reed watercraft used by fishermen in Peru for the past 3000 years, archaeologically evidenced from pottery shards. Named for the way they are ridden, straddled ('little reed horses' in English), fishermen use them to transport their nets and collect fish in their inner cavity. The name is not the original name, as horses were not introduced to South America until after the Spanish conquest of the Inca Empire. The ancient Mochica name of the watercraft is tūp. They are made from the same reed, the totora (Schoenoplectus californicus subsp. tatora), used by the Uru people on Lake Titicaca, and considered part of the Peruvian's National Cultural Heritage since 2016.

== Current use ==
Fishermen in the port town of Huanchaco famously, but in many other locations practically, still use these vessels to this day, riding the waves back into shore, and suggesting some of the first forms of wave riding. There is currently a minor debate in the surfing world as to whether or not this constitutes the first form of surfing.

Fishers have made minimal changes in the basic designs of the reed boats over the centuries. On the beach of Pimentel, near the city of Chiclayo, crafters had added Styrofoam to give symmetrical forms and to create a water-impermeable floatation compartment.

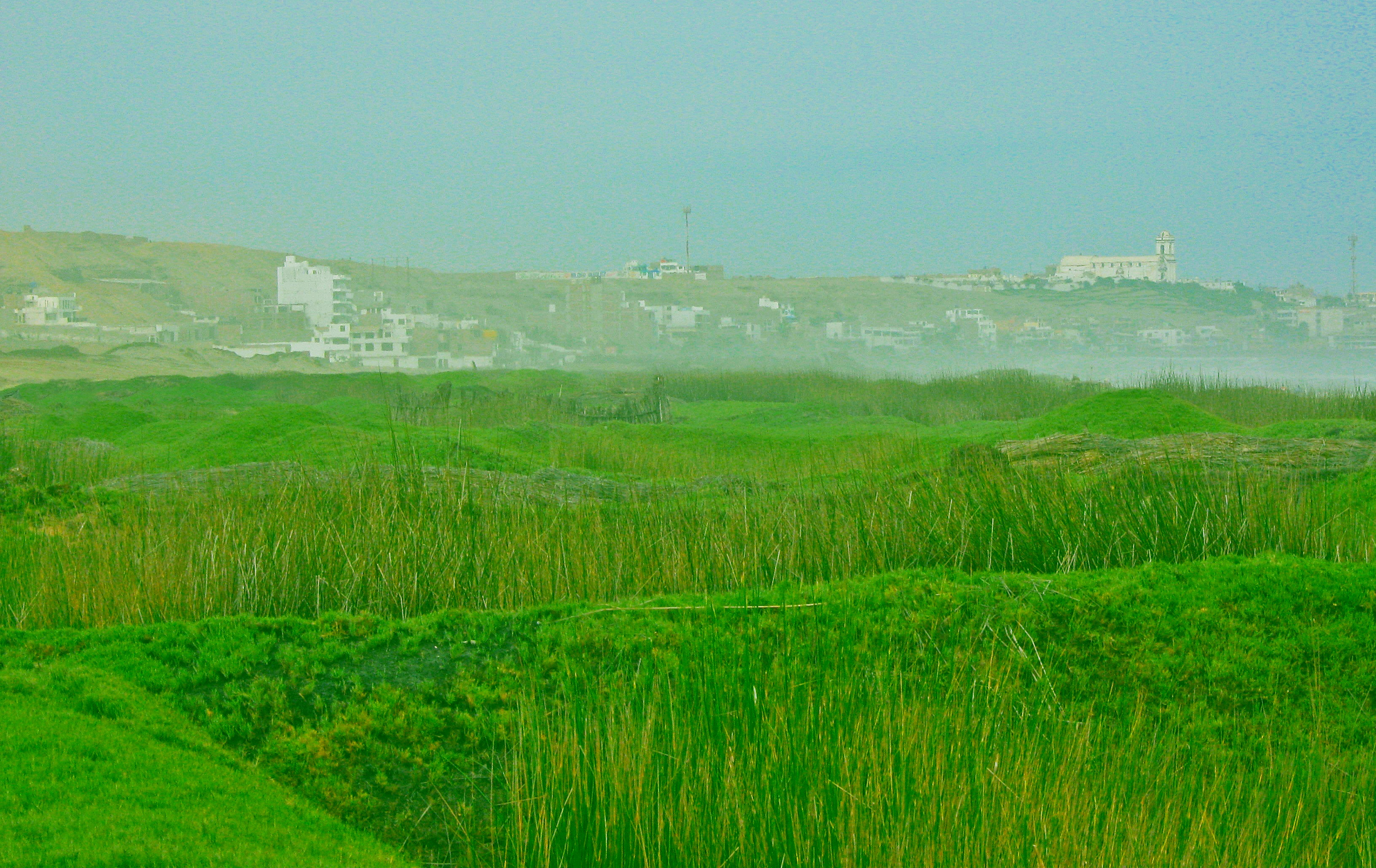
The swamps of Huanchaco are an ecological reserve about 14 kilometres (8.7 mi) northwest of the historic center of Trujillo, Peru. From this ecological reserve, people extracted the raw material for the manufacture of the ancient caballitos de totora used since the time of the Moche culture for fishing.

The Swamps of Huanchaco are an ecological reserve about 14 kilometres (8.7 mi) northwest of the historic center of Trujillo, Peru. From this ecological reserve, people extracted the raw material for the manufacture of the ancient caballitos de totora used since the time of the Moche culture for fishing. Huanchaco fishermen still use materials from these swamps to make their fishing boats.

== In popular culture ==
In Season 1 Episode 1 of The Wild Thornberrys, Nigel builds a caballito after the Commvee is lost in a flood.
