= Coca in Bolivia =

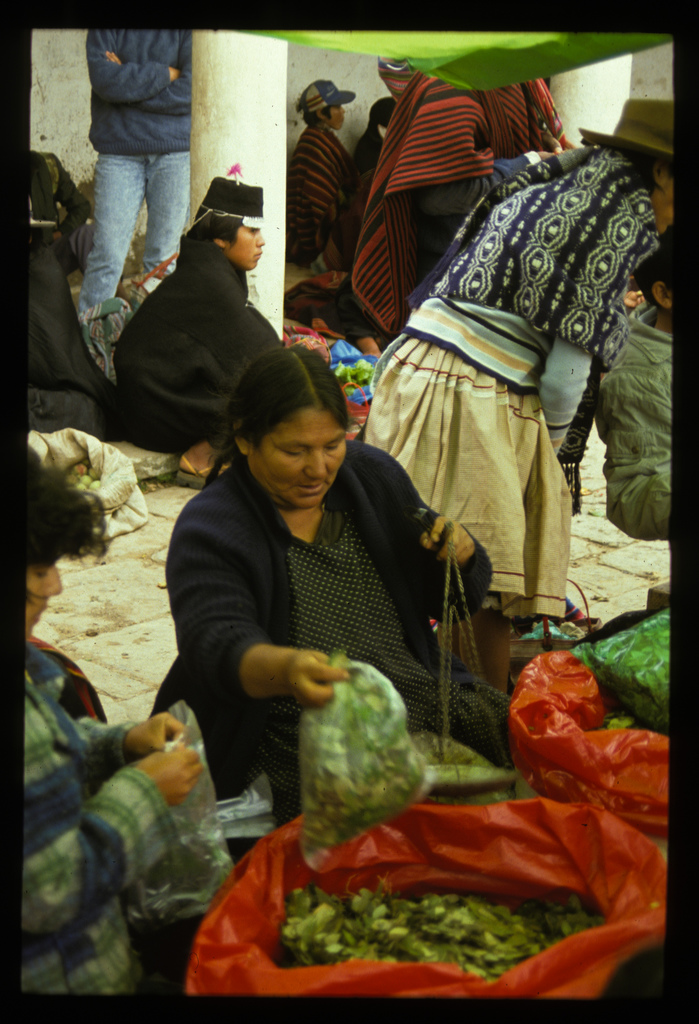
A Bolivian woman selling coca

Coca has been cultivated in medium-altitude parts of the Bolivian Andes since at least the Inca era, primarily in the Yungas north and east of La Paz. Cultivation expanded substantially in the 1980s into the Chapare region of Cochabamba and some production flowed into the international cocaine market. The US-backed efforts to criminalize and eradicate coca (outside the Yungas) as part of the war on drugs (as coca is used to make the stimulant, anaesthetic and illegal recreational drug cocaine) were met by the cocalero movement's growing capacity to organize. Violence between drug police and the Bolivian armed forces on one side and the movement on the other occurred episodically between 1987 and 2003. The cocaleros became an increasingly important political force during this period, co-founding the Movement for Socialism – Political Instrument for the Sovereignty of the Peoples party. Coca growers from both the Yungas and the Chapare have advocated for policies of "social control" over coca growing, maintaining a pre-set maximum area of cultivation as an alternative to drug war policies. In 2005, cocalero union leader Evo Morales was elected president of Bolivia. Morales pursued a combined policy of legalizing coca production in the Chapare and Yungas and eradication of the crop elsewhere.

The United Nations Office on Drugs and Crime (UNODC) estimated that 30,900 hectares of coca were planted in Bolivia in 2009, making Bolivia the third largest producer of coca after Colombia (68,000 hectares) and Peru (59,900). The UN estimates that 35,148 of 54,608 metric tons produced in Bolivia is sold in unauthorized markets dominated by the cocaine trade, most of it from coca production in the Chapare. Sales of coca leaf amounted to approximately US$265 million in 2009, representing 14% of all agricultural sales and 2% of Bolivia's GDP. Coca is legally sold in wholesale markets in Villa Fátima in La Paz and in Sacaba, Cochabamba.

In 2012, Bolivia strategically withdrew from the Single Convention on Narcotic Drugs, an international drug control treaty ratified by over 188 countries, and rejoined the following year with an exception for traditional coca use.

Bolivia's anti-drug strategy is often considered more successful than those of Colombia and Peru because it is based on cooperation with coca farmers rather than brutal or military repression. Bolivia recognizes the coca leaf as a traditional crop and legalizes a certain amount of cultivation for licit uses. Rather than imposing eradication by force, the government has negotiated with farmers to voluntarily reduce the area under cultivation beyond legal quotas.Coca production in Bolivia remained stable during the 2010s and declined compared to the 2000s, while it increased sharply in Colombia and Peru.

== History ==
The coca plant, a tea-like shrub, was cultivated mostly by small farmers in the Yungas regions.

In the 1980s, Bolivian farmers rushed to grow coca for the illicit market, as its price climbed and the economy collapsed. Soaring unemployment also contributed to the boom. Farmers turned to coca for its quick economic return, light weight, yield of four crops annually, and the abundance of United States dollars available in the trade, (a reliable store of value in a hyperinflated economy). The Bolivian government estimated that coca production had expanded from 1.63 million kilograms of leaves covering 4,100 hectares in 1977 to a minimum of 45 million kilograms over an area of at least 48,000 hectares in 1987. The number of growers expanded from 7,600 to at least 40,000 over the same period. Besides growers, the coca networks employed numerous Bolivians, including carriers (zepeadores), manufacturers of coca paste and cocaine, security personnel, and a wide range of more nefarious positions. The unparalleled revenues made the risk worthwhile for many.

In contrast to the non-coca agriculture of Bolivia that contracted in 1984 and 1985 coca growing expanded in this period and beyond. According to James Dunkerley "cocaine trade provided a critical support for stabilisation" during the mid- to late 1980s when the Bolivian economy transitioned to a more open market economy.

== Consequences ==
=== Economic ===
Bolivia's most lucrative crop in the 1980s was coca. The country was the second largest grower of coca in the world, supplying approximately 15 percent of the United States cocaine market in the late 1980s. Analysts believed that exports of coca paste or cocaine generated from US$600 million to US$1 billion annually in the 1980s, depending on prices and output.

=== Social ===
The production of cocaine has helped indirectly the stabilization of democracy in Bolivia by increasing incomes and standards of living, especially during crisis. It offered an alternative source of income for the military, reducing the likelihood of a military coup. Policies to eradicate have also contributed to the militarization of the nation.

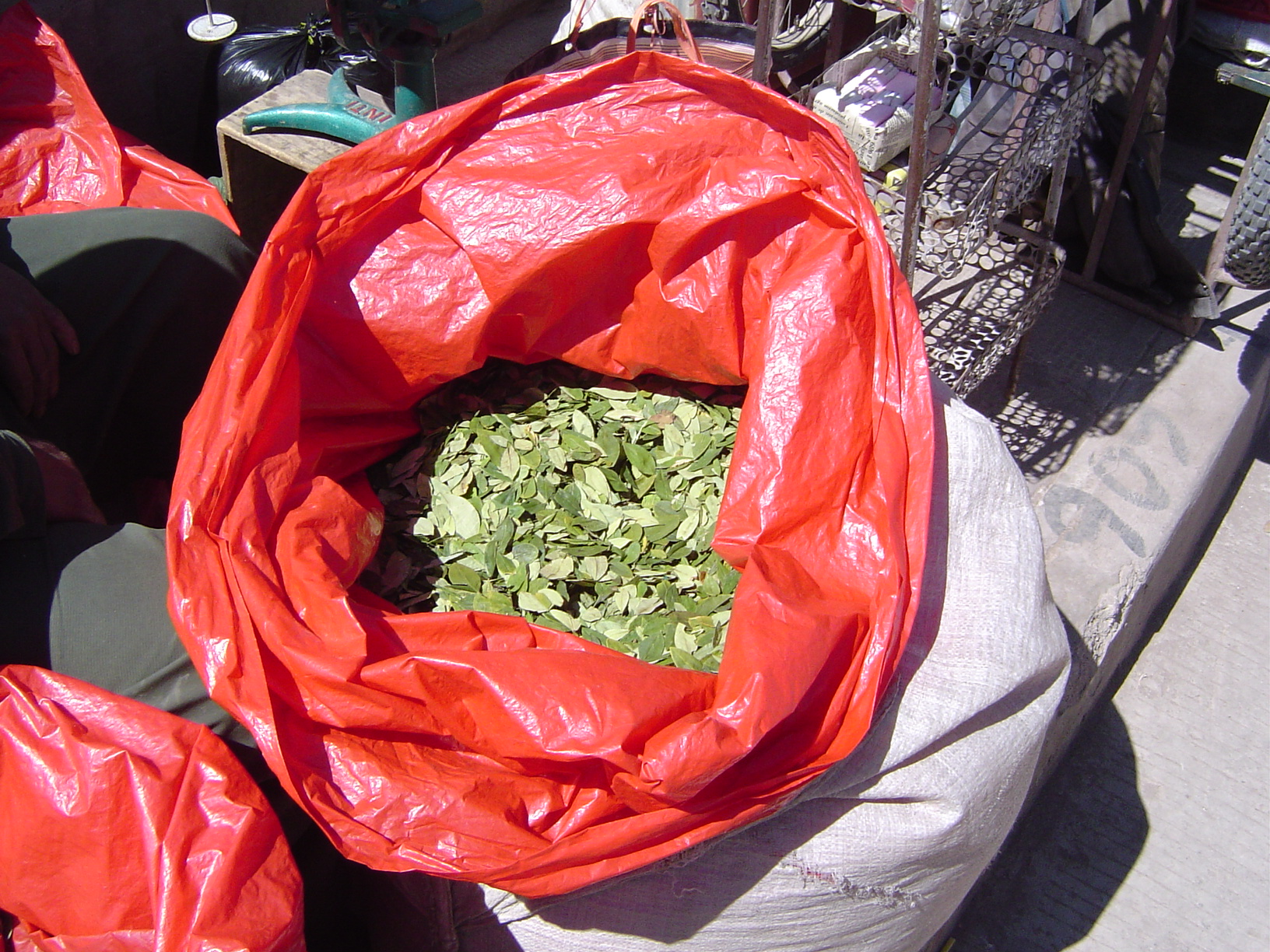
Coca leaves

== Legal framework ==
Formally, coca in Bolivia is regulated by Law 1008, the Coca and Controlled Substances Regime Law (Spanish: Ley 1008, Ley del Regimen de la Coca y Substancias Controladas) which was passed by the government of President Víctor Paz Estenssoro in July 1988. Some US priorities, however, were excluded from the law which bans defoliants, herbicides, and aerial spraying of crops in eradicating coca. Articles 8 through 11 of Law 1008 define three regions of coca growing under separate regulations:

1. Zone of traditional production: a delimited zone of historic coca producing regions comprising small plantations in Nor y Sud Yungas, Murillo, Muñecas, Franz Tamayo and Inquisiví provinces of La Paz department and in the Yungas of Vandiola in Tiraque y Carrasco provinces of Cochabamba department.
2. Zone of excessive production in transition: Recently colonized areas of production subject to a program of alternative development, crop substitution, and scheduled eradication with compensation. Zona de producción excedentaria en transición. In Saavedra, Larecaja and Loayza provinces of La Paz department and Chapare, Carrasco, Tiraque and Araní provinces of Cochabamba departament.
3. Zone of illicit production: All other regions, subject to mandatory eradication without compensation.

This framework was effectively modified by agreement between President Carlos Mesa and coca growers in 2004, permitting current growers to maintain a cato (1,600 m^{2}) of coca per family.

The Constituent Assembly of 2006-2007 included an article on coca in the new Constitution, which was approved by referendum in 2009. It states:

Article 384

The State shall protect native and ancestral coca as cultural patrimony, a renewable natural resource of Bolivia's biodiversity, and as a factor of social cohesion; in its natural state it is not a narcotic. Its revaluing, production, commercialization, and industrialization shall be regulated by law.

— Fourth Part, Title II, Chapter Seven: Coca, Nueva Constitución Política del Estado,(p. 89)

The Evo Morales government is drafting a new law on coca, which is being circulated for feedback among coca growing communities as of December 2011. The law proposes expanding legal production to 20,000 hectares, 12,000 in the currently approved regions and 8,000 in the Chapare.

=== International drug control conventions ===
In January 2012, Bolivia withdrew from the Single Convention on Narcotic Drugs over the indigenous use of the coca leaf. It soon re-applied to the treaty with a reservation allowing traditional use of coca; the re-accession came into force in February 2013. Blocking the reservation required objection by 61 countries, one-third of the, at the time, 183 parties to the convention; 15 countries objected by the deadline. The UNODC said it would "continue to work in Bolivia in accordance with its mandates to support the national system of drug control and the country's international cooperation in these matters."

== Eradication efforts ==
Government efforts to eradicate the expansion of coca cultivation in Bolivia began in 1983, when Bolivia committed itself to a five-year program to reduce coca production and created the Coca Eradication Directorate (Dirección de la Reconversión de la Coca—Direco) under the Ministry of Agriculture, Campesino Affairs, and Livestock Affairs. Bolivia's National Directorate for the Control of Dangerous Substances (Dirección Nacional para el Control de Substancias Peligrosas—DNCSP) was able to eradicate several thousand hectares of coca. These efforts, however, put only a small dent in the coca industry and were highly controversial among thousands of peasants. Under the joint agreement signed by the United States and Bolivia in 1987, which created DNCSP, Bolivia allocated US$72.2 million for the 1988 to 1991 period to eradication programs, including a wide-ranging rural development program for the Chapare region. The program was aided by an 88 percent drop in the local price of coca caused by the fall in cocaine prices in the United States.

The economics of eradication were particularly frustrating. As more coca was destroyed, the local price increased, making it more attractive to other growers. Bolivia, however, was seeking additional funds from the United States and Western Europe to proceed with an eradication plan that was supposed to provide peasants US$2,000 per hectare eradicated. In 1988 coca growing became technically illegal outside a specially mandated 12,000- hectare area in the Yungas. A four-year government eradication campaign begun in 1989 sought to convert 55 percent of coca areas into legal crops. Coffee and citrus fruits were offered as alternative crops to coca despite the fact that their return was a fraction of that of coca.

Outside of accepted limits, the Morales government has continued coca eradication efforts. Its 2011 eradication effort set a new record: over the first eleven months, 10,051 hectares were eradicated. The strategy of the Morales government has been described as "combating drug trafficking by working cooperatively with coca growers to diversify crops and promote alternative development." In August 2015, the UN announced that coca cultivation was at its lowest in 13 years.

== Timeline ==
1987
US anti-drug teams arrive in the Chapare
May 26, 1987
Cocaleros begin highway blockade in the Chapare. Some 10,000 cocaleros demand the right to review the Three-Year Plan on narcotrafficking and the draft of Law 1008. A police intervention leads to 8 deaths and 500 arrests in Parotani
June 1987
Twenty thousand cocaleros march in protest of the deaths at Parotani
August 27, 1987—August 30, 1987
National Forum on the Coca-Cocaine problematic in Cochabamba (Spanish: Foro Nacional sobre la Problemática Coca-Cocaína)
May 1988—June 1988
Cocaleros present their own proposed "General Law of Coca," which is supported by the COB labor federation. When this is rejected, cocaleros block eastbound and westbound highways from Cochabamba.
June 27, 1988
Cocalero protest ends in the Villa Tunari massacre, in which as many as twelve cocaleros are killed
July 1988
Law 1008 is passed by the Bolivian government
June 1991
March of cocaleros against forced eradication is repressed in its fourth day.
September 1994
March for life, coca, and dignity from the Chapare to La Paz ends in agreement with government.
September 1994
Women's "March for life and national sovereignty" from the Chapare to La Paz ends in agreement with government.
April 1995
Poor returns on alternative crops motivate the Chapere coca growers to participate in a series of general strikes that would lead to the 1995 Bolivian state of siege
1997—2001
Government of Hugo Banzer adopts Plan Dignity program of forced eradication, deploying the military and specialized police. Deadly conflicts between security forces and coca growers.
August 1998
Over 1,000 cocaleros march from the Chapare to La Paz to protest eradication
2006
Cocalero leader Evo Morales assumes the Presidency of Bolivia. Forced eradication is scaled back and the cato of coca is authorized in the Chapare.
2008
Government of Evo Morales expels the US Drug Enforcement Administration (DEA) from Bolivia.
2012—2013
Bolivia withdraws from the Single Convention on Narcotic Drugs, then rejoins with an exception allowing traditional indigenous use of coca.
September 2015
A DEA drug sting targeting Evo Morales is revealed to the public, code-named "Operation Naked King."
November 2025
The DEA is allowed back into Bolivia by President Rodrigo Paz.

== Bibliography ==
- Dunkerley, James (1990). Political Transition and Economic Stabilisation Bolivia, 1982-1989. Institute of Latin American Studies University of London. p. 33. ISBN 0 901145 70 X.

== See also ==
- Coca production in Colombia
- Cocalero
