= Espíritu Santo River =

Espíritu Santo
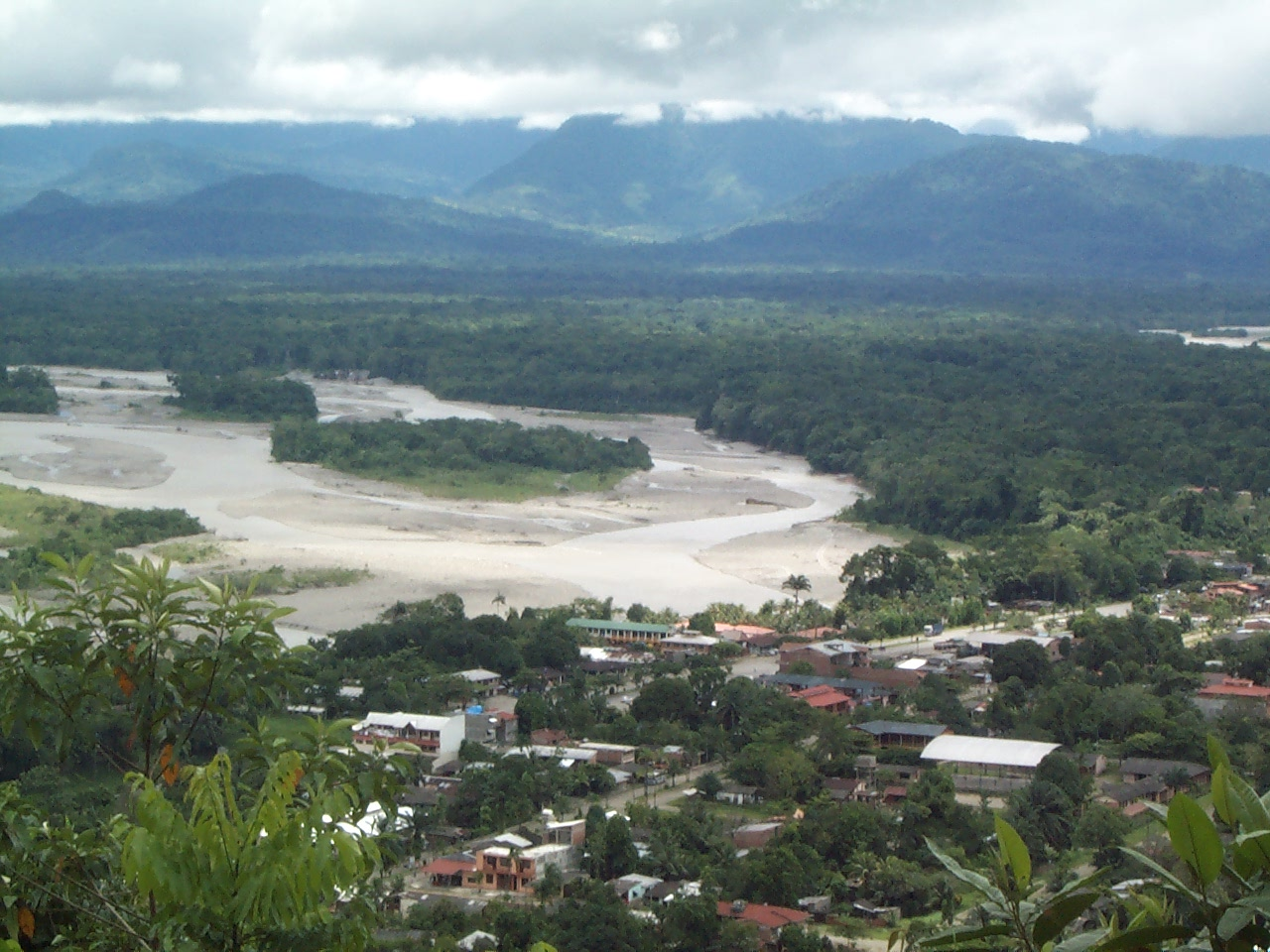
- San Matéo River and Espíritu Santo River (upper right) in Villa Tunari just before their confluence in the east of the town

Location
- Country: Bolivia
- Department: Cochabamba Department
- Province: Chapare Province
- Municipality: Villa Tunari Municipality

Physical characteristics
- Source
  - location: Serranía de Callejas
  - coordinates: 17°11′56″S 65°41′11″W
  - elevation: 2,720 m (8,920 ft)
- Mouth
  - location: Villa Tunari
  - coordinates: 16°58′26″S 65°24′40″W
  - elevation: 289 m (948 ft)
- Length: 66 km (41 mi)

Basin features
- Tributaries
  - left: Lima Tambo, Juntas de Corani, Blanco
  - right: Jordan Mayu, Arispe Mayu, Cristal Mayito, Cristal Mayu, Huayruruny, Avispas

The Espíritu Santo River is a Bolivian river in the Cochabamba Department, Chapare Province, Villa Tunari Municipality. It belongs to the Amazon River watershed. Espíritu Santo River originates in the Callejas mountains south west of Villa Tunari. It initially flows in a northeasterly direction, before turning to the east towards Villa Tunari. In the east of the town, it meets San Matéo River which comes from the south west. From the confluence the river is known as Chapare River.

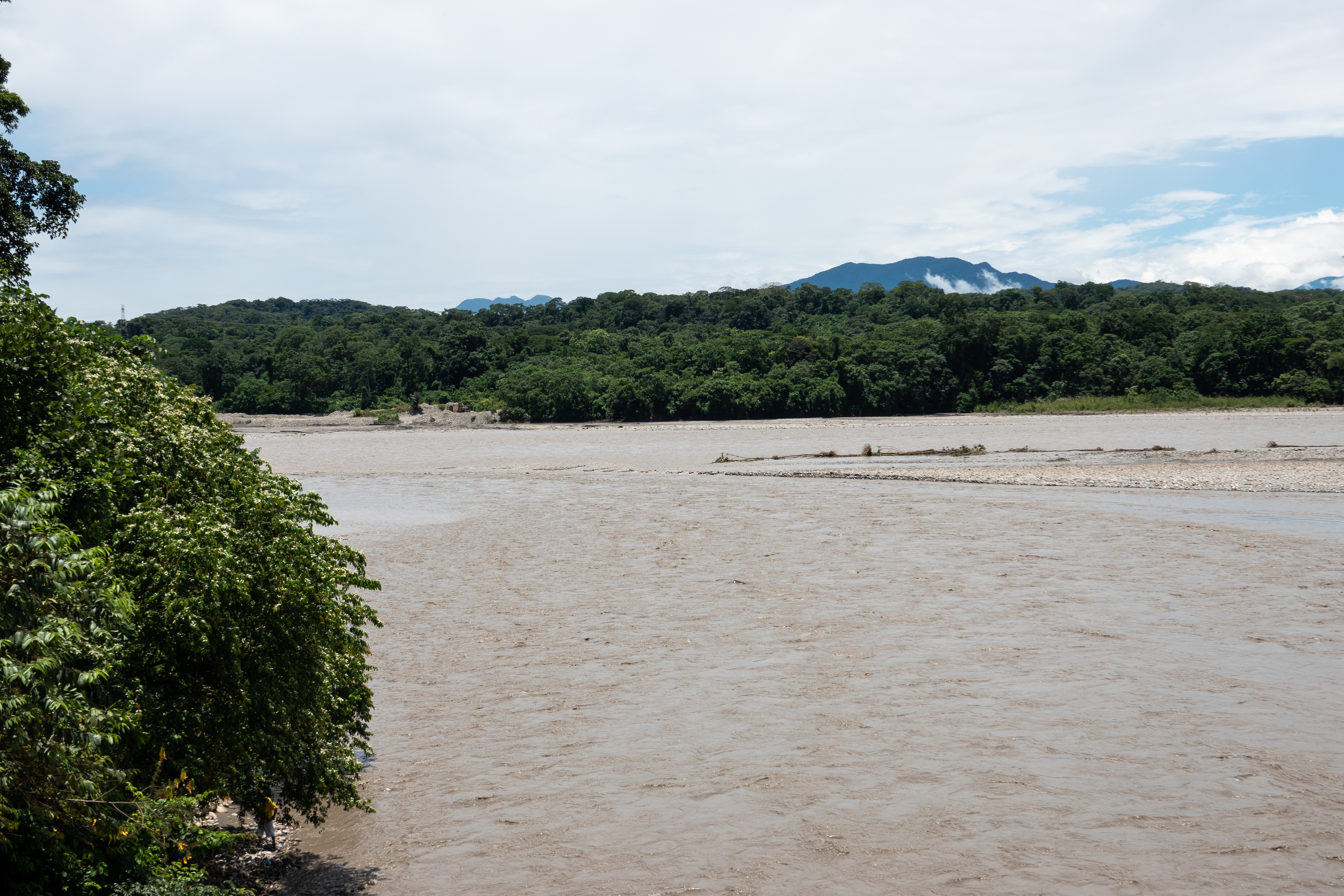
San Matéo River and Espíritu Santo River confluence to form Chapare River at Villa Tunari

== See also ==
- List of rivers of Bolivia
