= San Matéo River =

Bolivian river

San Matéo
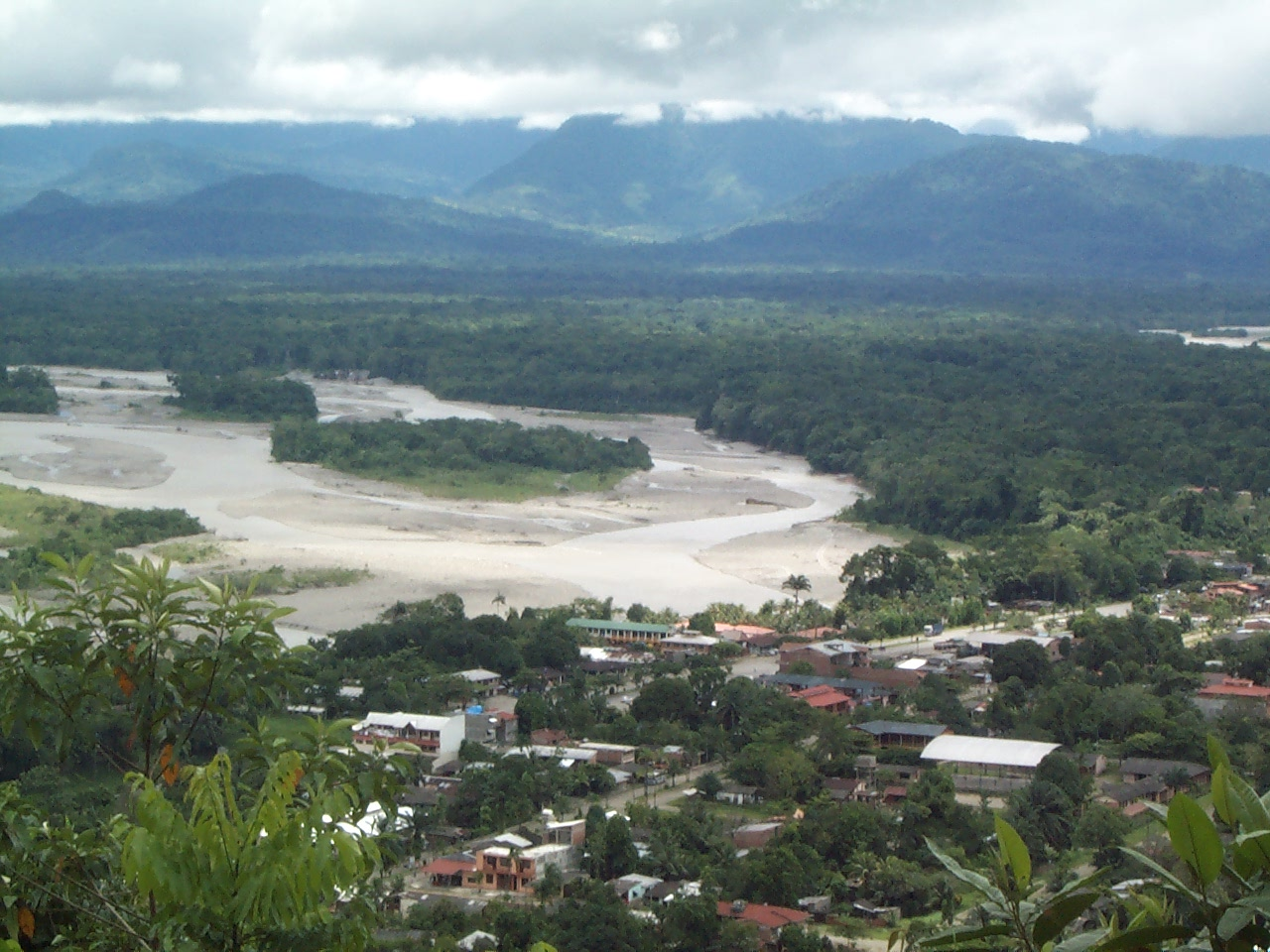
- San Matéo River and Espíritu Santo River (upper right) in Villa Tunari just before their confluence to Chapare River in the east of the town.

Location
- Country: Bolivia
- Region: Cochabamba Department
- Municipality: Tiraque Province, Chapare Province

Physical characteristics
- Mouth: Chapare River
  - location: Villa Tunari
  - coordinates: 16°58′S 65°24′W
  - elevation: 289 m (948 ft)

Basin features
- Tributaries
  - right: Ivirizu, Chillawara

San Matéo is a Bolivian river in the Cochabamba Department, Tiraque Province and in the Chapare Province, Villa Tunari Municipality. It belongs to the Amazon River watershed.

San Matéo River flows to Villa Tunari in a northeasterly direction. Shortly before reaching the town it receives waters from its most important tributary, the Ivirizu River, which comes from the south. In the east of Villa Tunari, in the department of Cochabamba, San Matéo River meets Espíritu Santo River coming from the west. From the point of the confluence, the river is known as Chapare River.

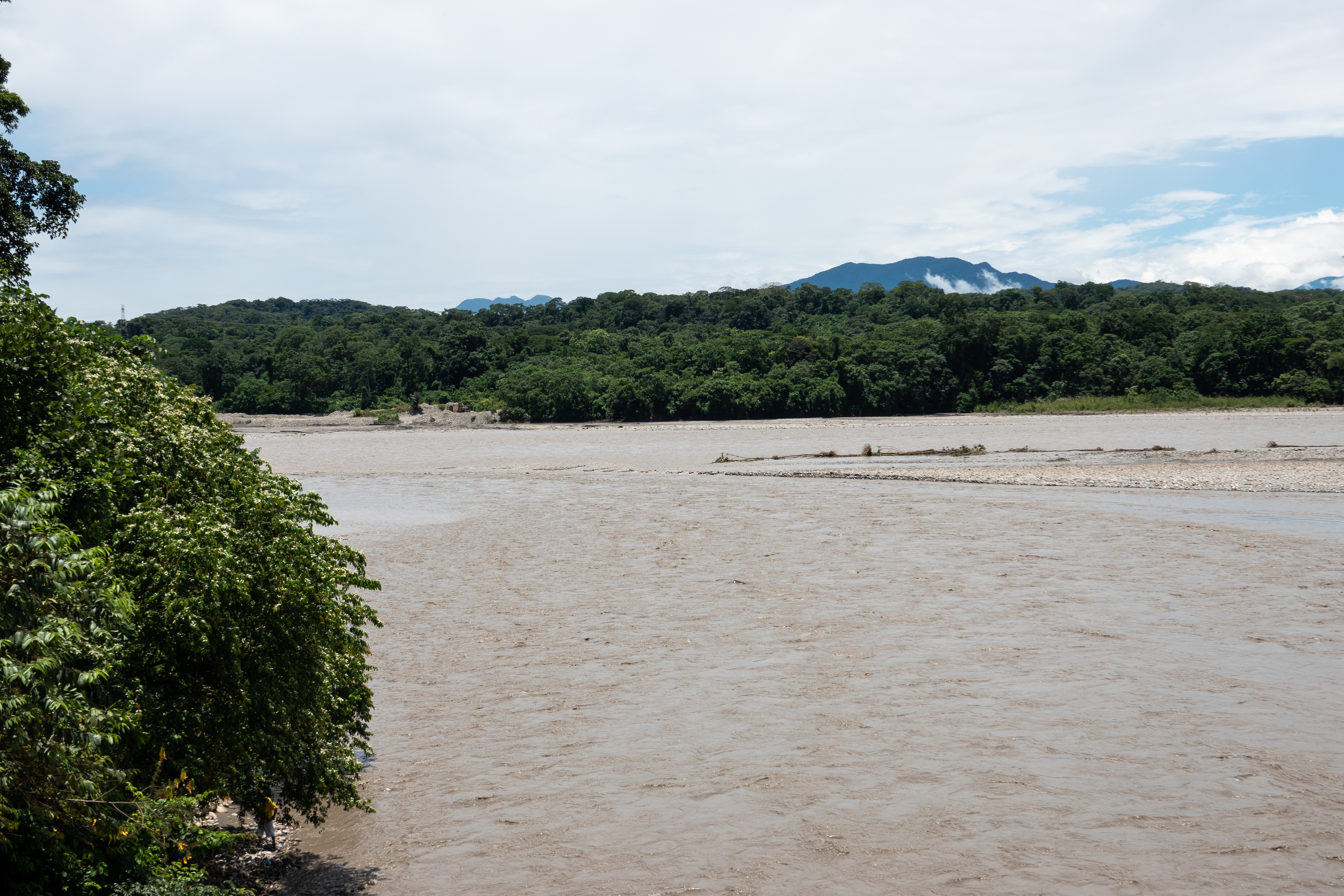
San Matéo River and Espíritu Santo River confluence to form Chapare River at Villa Tunari
