= Villa Tunari =

Villa Tunari Tunarimarka
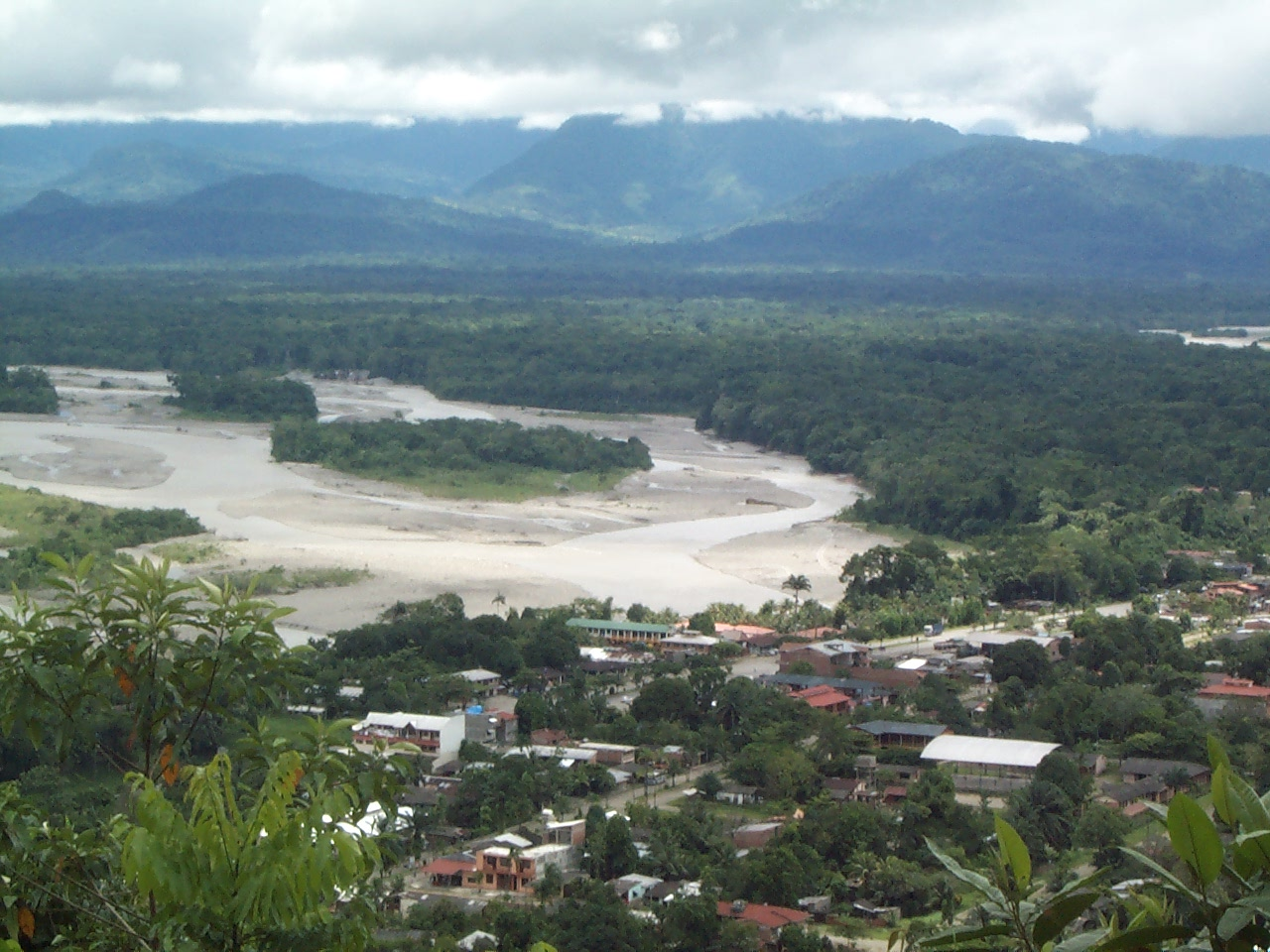
- Villa Tunari with Espíritu Santo River (upper right) and San Mateo River

- Location within Bolivia
- Coordinates: 16°58′S 65°25′W
- Country: Bolivia
- State: Cochabamba Department
- Province: Chapare Province
- Municipality: Villa Tunari Municipality
- Canton: Villa Tunari Canton

Population (2012)
  - Total: 3,213
- Time zone: UTC-4 (BOT)

Villa Tunari or Tunari is a location in the department of Cochabamba, Bolivia. It is the seat of the Villa Tunari Municipality, the third municipal section of the Chapare Province. According to the census 2012 the population was 3,213 in the town which is an increment from 2,510 registered during the 2001 census.

Villa Tunari has several parks located nearby including Parque Machía and Carrasco National Park. Parque Machía is home to one of three wildlife centers maintained by Comunidad Inti Wara Yassi and supported by international volunteers. Villa Tunari is famous among tourists due to the tropical weather and due to nearby national parks. Recently the town gained important infrastructure due to the tourist industry and because a new paper industry seated near to the town.

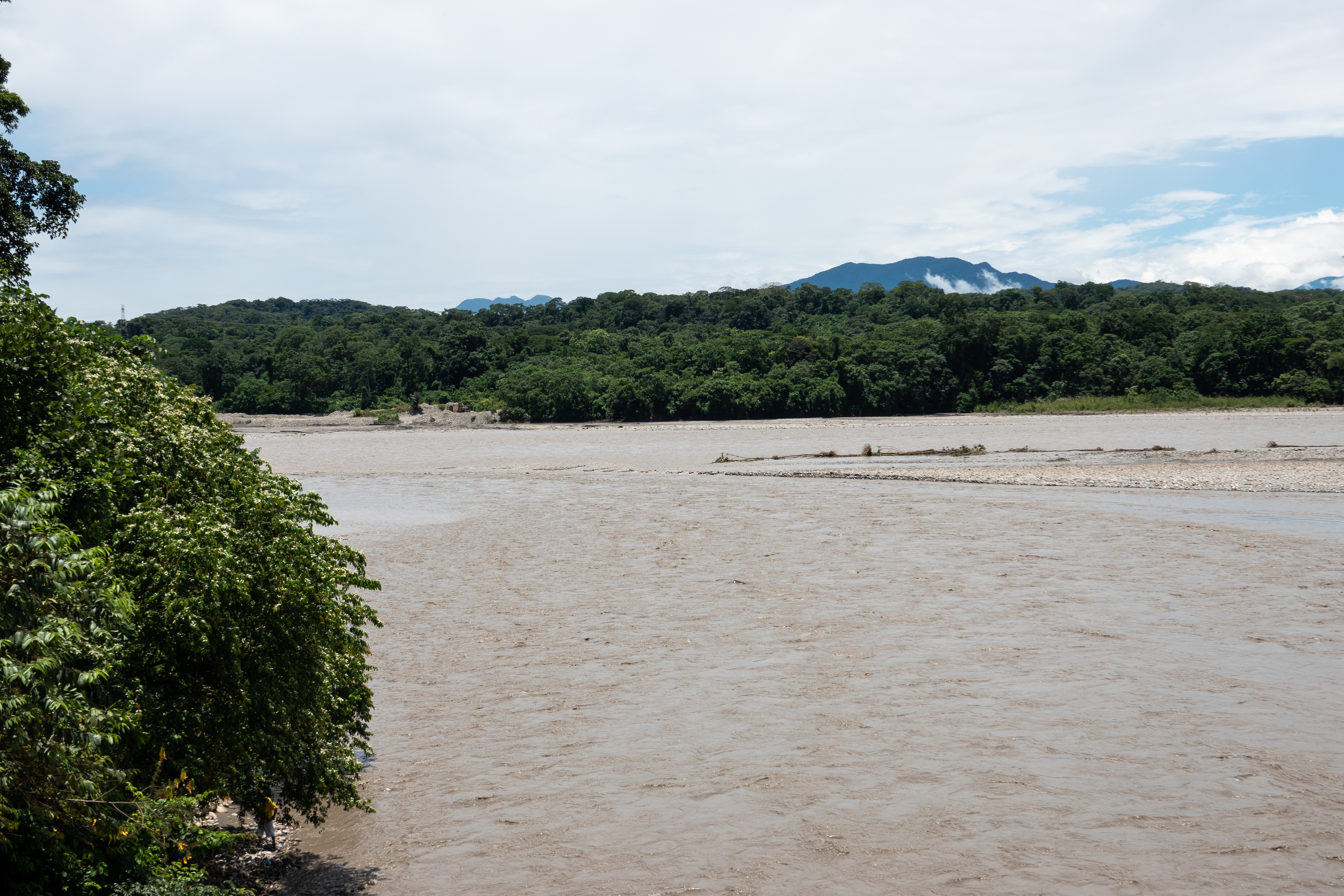
San Matéo River and Espíritu Santo River confluence to form Chapare River at Villa Tunari

== Population ==
The population increased moderately from 2001 census because little rural communities were settled near to the town. Most of people are quechua descent and the main spoken languages are Spanish and Quechua.

year	Population	Reference
1992	1 597	census
2001	2 510	census
2012	3 210	census

== Geography ==
Villa Tunari - about 160km to the northeast of Cochabamba - is located at the final folds of the Andean foothills of central Bolivia, a transition zone where steep orographies meet the extensive llanos region of Bolivia - itself a mosaic of savanna, rainforest, and monsoonal landscapes. The general vicinity of Villa Tunari is predominantly tropical rainforest, of the Southwestern Amazonian variety. Precipitation in this region is plentiful, with some of the highest annual rainfall trends in the country. Villa Tunari is a popular tourist destination thanks to its dramatic proximity to the central Andes, and its rich ecological surroundings. Under the Köppen climate classification, Villa Tunari has a tropical rainforest climate with a lengthy rainy season, a shorter dry season and ample precipitation throughout the year. Villa Tunari experiences the highest recorded annual precipitation in Bolivia, and frequently exceeds 5,000mm of precipitation per year.

=== Climate ===
Climate data for Villa Tunari (Chipiriri), elevation 260 m (850 ft), (1970–2011)
Month	Jan	Feb	Mar	Apr	May	Jun	Jul	Aug	Sep	Oct	Nov	Dec	Year
Mean daily maximum °C (°F)	32.0 (89.6)	31.8 (89.2)	31.7 (89.1)	31.0 (87.8)	28.8 (83.8)	27.8 (82.0)	28.2 (82.8)	29.8 (85.6)	30.6 (87.1)	32.1 (89.8)	32.2 (90.0)	32.1 (89.8)	30.7 (87.2)
Daily mean °C (°F)	27.1 (80.8)	26.8 (80.2)	26.8 (80.2)	25.7 (78.3)	23.7 (74.7)	22.5 (72.5)	22.2 (72.0)	23.2 (73.8)	24.2 (75.6)	26.3 (79.3)	26.8 (80.2)	27.0 (80.6)	25.2 (77.4)
Mean daily minimum °C (°F)	22.1 (71.8)	21.8 (71.2)	21.8 (71.2)	20.4 (68.7)	18.6 (65.5)	17.2 (63.0)	16.3 (61.3)	16.6 (61.9)	17.8 (64.0)	20.5 (68.9)	21.2 (70.2)	21.9 (71.4)	19.7 (67.4)
Average precipitation mm (inches)	803.2 (31.62)	682.4 (26.87)	638.7 (25.15)	422.3 (16.63)	217.5 (8.56)	156.2 (6.15)	135.5 (5.33)	129.7 (5.11)	189.1 (7.44)	329.2 (12.96)	500.7 (19.71)	632.6 (24.91)	4,837.1 (190.44)
Average precipitation days	19.7	17.2	18.1	13.4	11.3	9.7	7.2	6.6	8.1	10.9	14.7	18.1	155
Average relative humidity (%)	86.2	86.8	87.0	86.4	86.9	86.8	85.6	83.4	82.1	82.8	84.0	85.5	85.3
Source: Servicio Nacional de Meteorología e Hidrología de Bolivia

== Sports ==
The Estadio Olímpico Bicentenario de Villa Tunari is located in Villa Tunari. The 25,000-capacity stadium is used for football matches. It opened on 8 September 2018.

== See also ==
- Comunidad Inti Wara Yassi
- Tunari National Park
- UMOPAR
- Villa Tunari Massacre
- Villa Tunari – San Ignacio de Moxos Highway
