= Warawara Lake (Cochabamba) =

Warawara
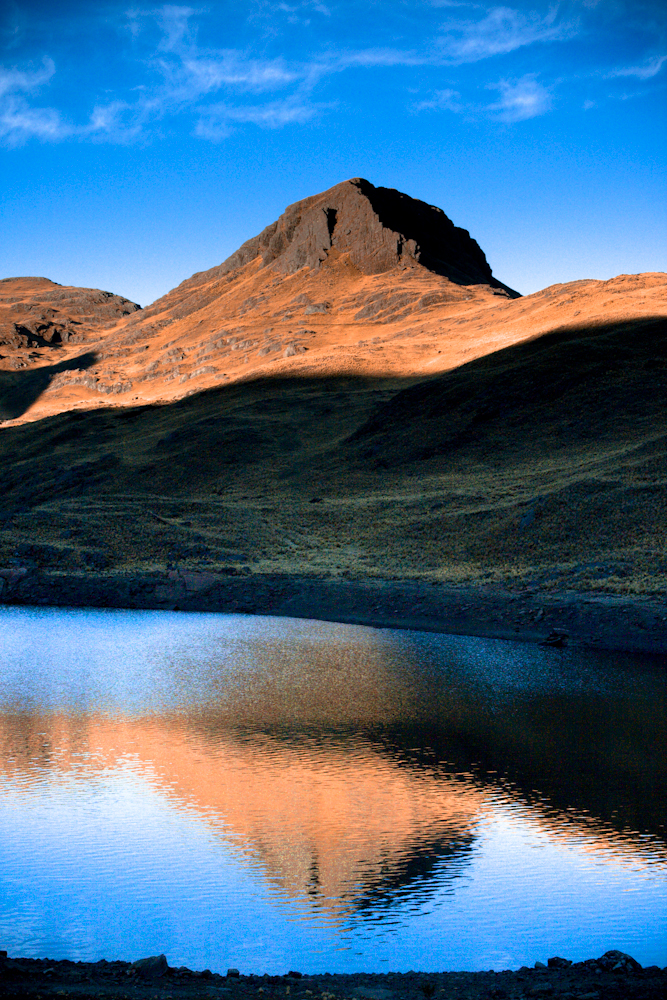

- Location within Cochabamba Location within Bolivia Location within South America
- Interactive map of Warawara
- Location: Bolivia; Cochabamba Department, Chapare Province
- Coordinates: 17°17′40″S 66°07′30″W
- Max. length: 0.8 km (0.50 mi)
- Max. width: 0.5 km (0.31 mi)
- Surface elevation: 4,105 m (13,468 ft)

Warawara (Aymara warawara star, Hispanicized spellings Huara Huara, Huarahuara), often spelled Wara Wara, is a lake in the Tunari National Park in Bolivia. It is located in the Cochabamba Department, Chapare Province, Sacaba Municipality. Warawara lies north east of the city Cochabamba and north of Alalay Lake. The lake is situated 4,105 metres (13,468 ft) high. It is 0.8 km long and 0.5 km at its widest point.

== See also ==
- List of lakes of Bolivia
