= Cochabamba Municipality =

- Municipality
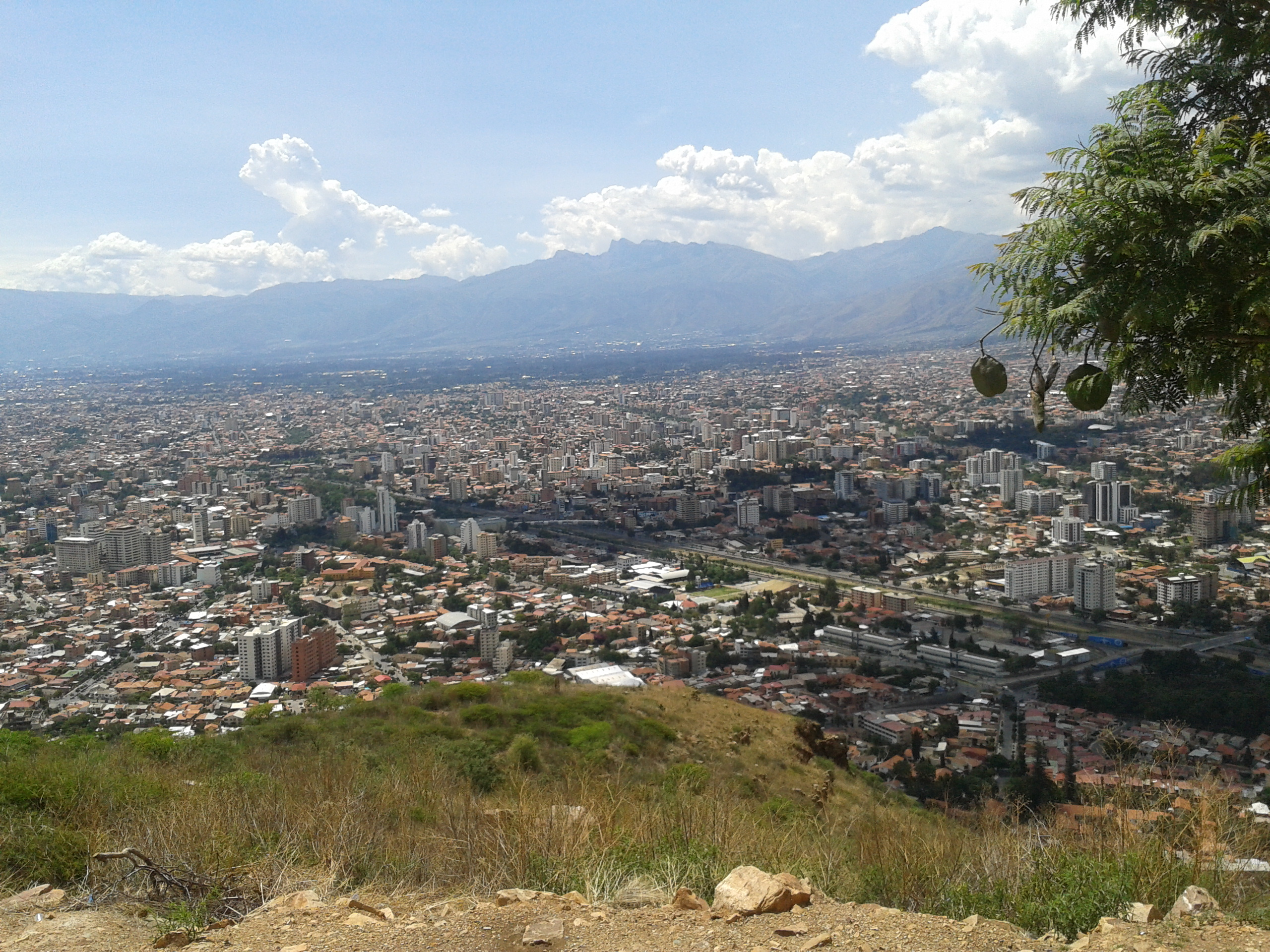

- Flag

- Location within Bolivia
- Coordinates: 17°20′S 66°02′W
- Country: Bolivia
- Department: Cochabamba Department
- Province: Cercado Province
- Seat: Cochabamba

Government
  - Mayor: Manfred Reyes Villa (2022)

Area
  - Total: 151 sq mi (391 km^{2})
- Elevation: 8.69 ft (2.649 m)

Population (2012)
  - Total: 691,276
- Time zone: UTC-4 (BOT)

Cochabamba Municipality is the only municipal section of the Cercado Province in the Cochabamba Department, Bolivia. Its seat is Cochabamba.

== Subdivision ==
Cochabamba Municipality is divided into one canton.

Canton	Inhabitants (2012)	Seat
Cochabamba Canton	691,276	Cochabamba

== See also ==
- Cochabamba
