= Cercado Province (Cochabamba) =

- Province
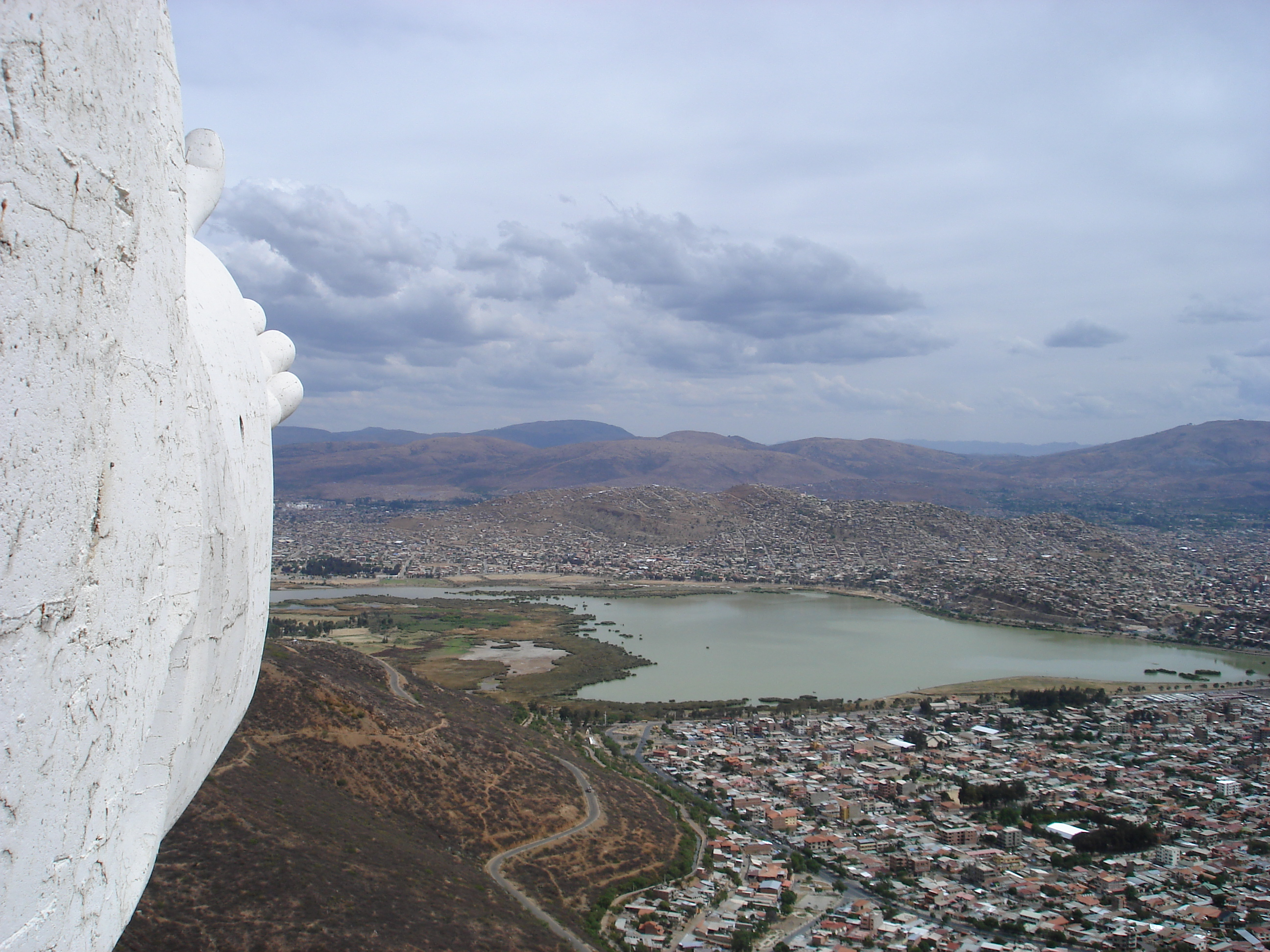
- Alalay Lake and Cochabamba as seen from Cristo de la Concordia

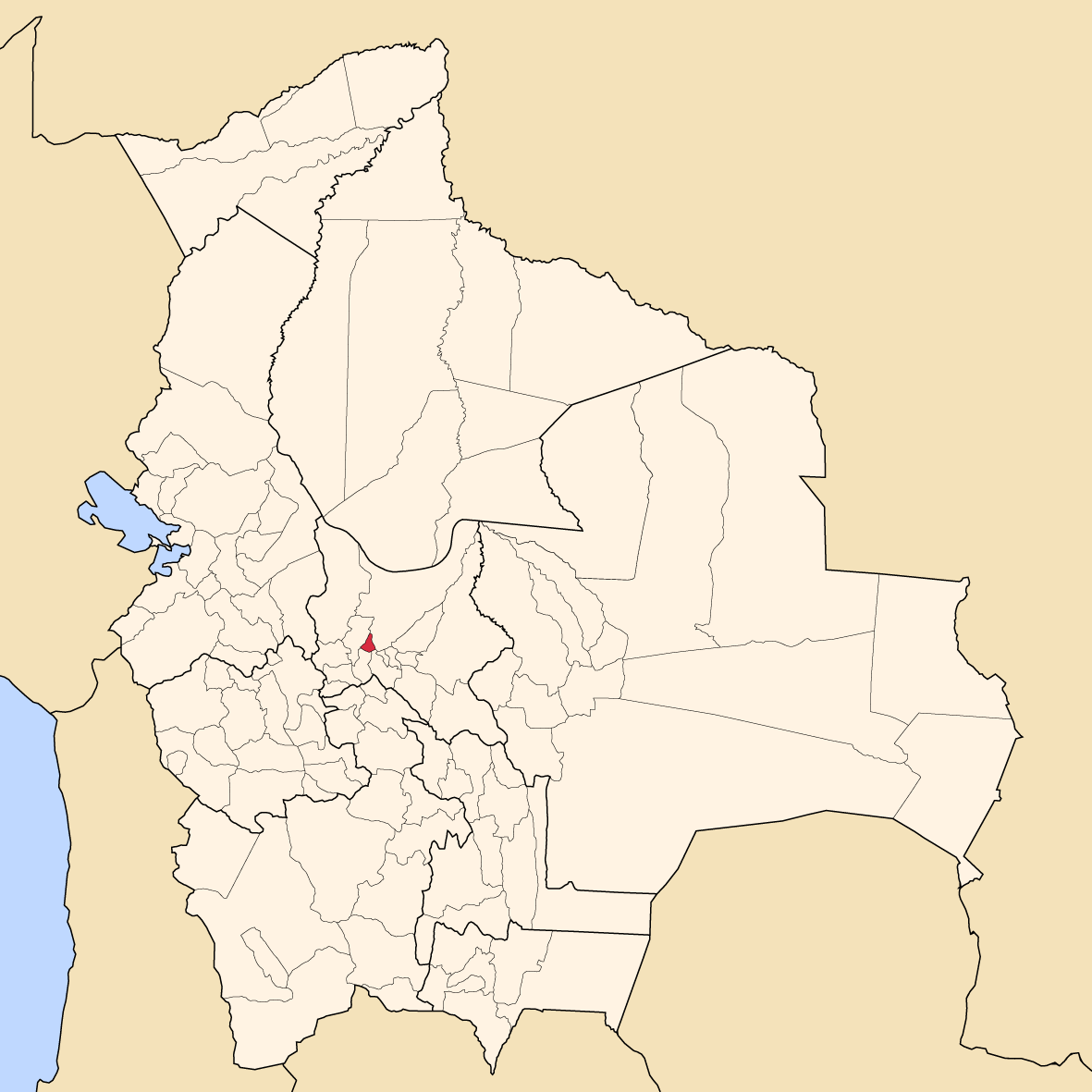
- Location of Cercado Province within Bolivia

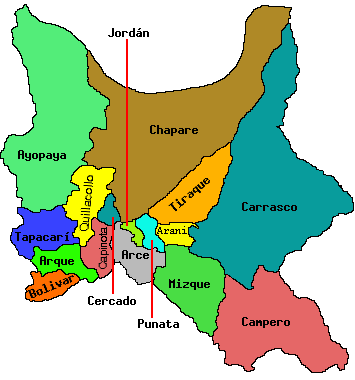
- Coordinates: 17°23′S 66°10′W
- Country: Bolivia
- Department: Cochabamba Department
- Capital: Cochabamba

Area
  - Total: 151 sq mi (391 km^{2})
- Elevation: 9,020 ft (2,750 m)

Population (2024 census)
  - Total: 661,484
  - Density: 4,380/sq mi (1,690/km^{2})
  - Ethnicities: Quechua Aymara
- Time zone: UTC-4 (BOT)

Cercado is a province in Cochabamba Department, Bolivia. Its capital is Cochabamba, which is also the capital of the department.

== Subdivision ==
The province consists of one municipality, Cochabamba Municipality. It is identical to the province.

== The people ==
The people are predominantly indigenous citizens of Quechuan and Aymaran descent.

| Ethnic group | Inhabitants (%) |
|---|---|
| Quechua | 48.6 |
| Aymara | 10.2 |
| Guaraní, Chiquitos, Moxos | 1.0 |
| Not indigenous | 39.7 |
| Other indigenous groups | 0.4 |

Ref.: obd.descentralizacion.gov.bo

== Languages ==
The languages spoken in the Cercado Province are mainly Spanish, Quechua, Aymara, and Guaraní. The following table shows the number of those belonging to the recognized group of speakers.

| Language | Inhabitants |
|---|---|
| Quechua | 196,374 |
| Aymara | 39,594 |
| Guaraní | 602 |
| Another native | 458 |
| Spanish | 478,004 |
| Foreign | 30,046 |
| Only native | 12,556 |
| Native and Spanish | 208,237 |
| Only Spanish | 270,208 |

Ref.: obd.descentralizacion.gov.bo

== Places of interest ==
- Tunari National Park
- Laguna Alalay
