= Sacaba Municipality =

- Municipality
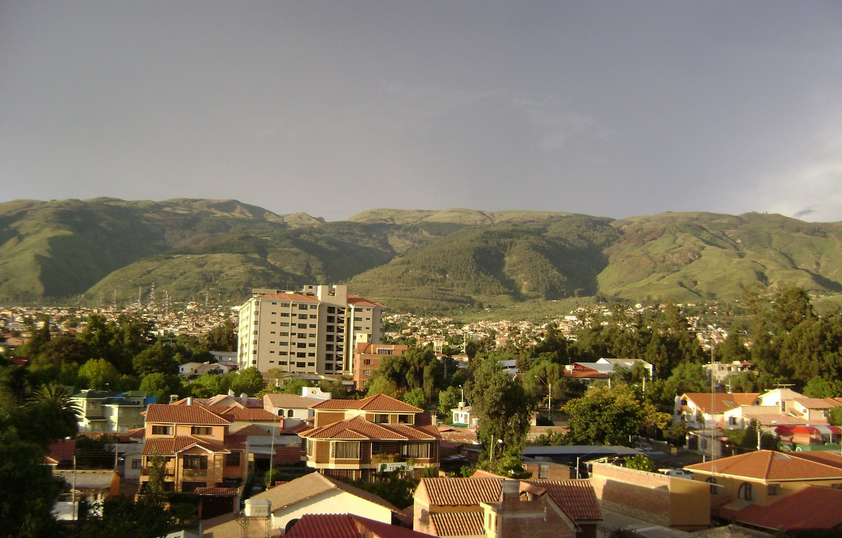

- Flag Coat of arms

- Location within Bolivia
- Coordinates: 17°20′S 66°02′W
- Country: Bolivia
- Department: Cochabamba Department
- Province: Chapare Province
- Seat: Sacaba

Government
  - Mayor: Policarpio Quinteros (2007)
  - President: Guido Mejia Ojalvo (2007)

Area
  - Total: 289.9 sq mi (750.8 km^{2})

Population (2024)
  - Total: 218,502
  - Density: 753.8/sq mi (291.0/km^{2})
- Time zone: UTC-4 (BOT)

Sacaba Municipality is the first municipal section of the Chapare Province in the Cochabamba Department, Bolivia. Its seat is Sacaba.

== Subdivision ==
Sacaba Municipality is divided into six cantons.

Canton	Inhabitants (2001)	Seat
Sacaba Canton	101,736	Sacaba
Aguirre Canton	2,807	Aguirre
Chiñata Canton	6,674	Chiñata
Lava Lava Canton	512	Lava Lava
Quewiñapampa Canton	749	Quewiñapampa
Ucuchi Canton	4,622	Ucuchi

== See also ==
- Pukara Mayu
- Q'inqu Mayu
- Rocha River
- Warawara Lake
