= Chapare River =

Coordinates: 16°21′S 65°2′W

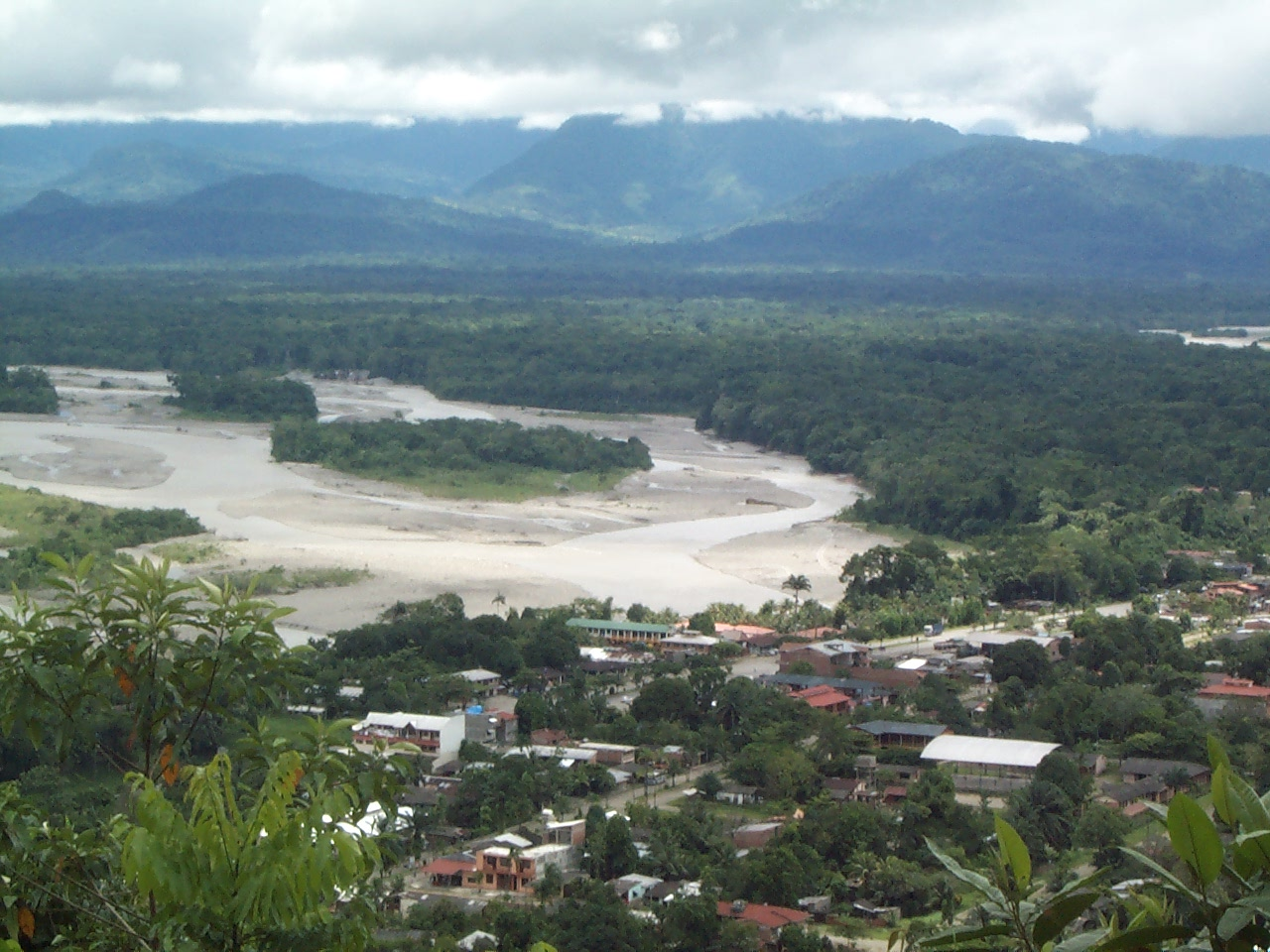
- San Mateo River and Espíritu Santo River (upper right) in Villa Tunari just before their confluence to Chapare River in the east of the town.

Location
- Country: Bolivia
- State: Cochabamba Department
- District: Chapare Province
- City: Villa Tunari

Physical characteristics
- Source: Cordilerra Central de Bolivia
  - location: Carrasco National Park, Cochabamba Department, Bolivia
- Length: 173 mi (278 km)
- Discharge
  - location: Ichilo River

The Chapare River is a river in Bolivia, which is a tributary of the Mamoré River in the Amazon Basin. The river has its source at the confluence of Espíritu Santo River and San Mateo River in the Cochabamba Department at Villa Tunari. It is the main waterway of Chapare Province in central Bolivia.

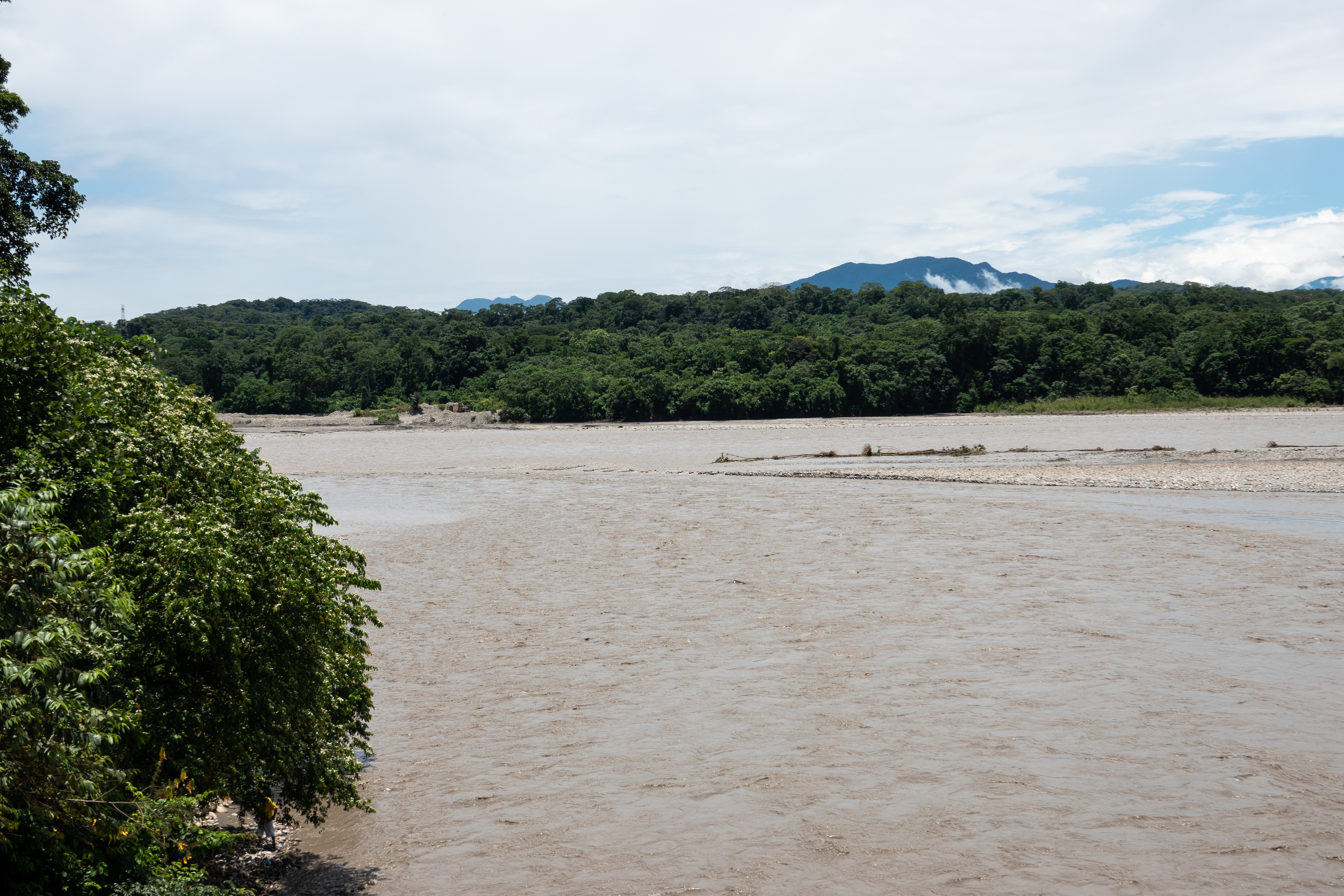
San Matéo River and Espíritu Santo River confluence to form Chapare River at Villa Tunari

== See also ==
- Tunari National Park
