= Colomi Municipality =

- Municipality
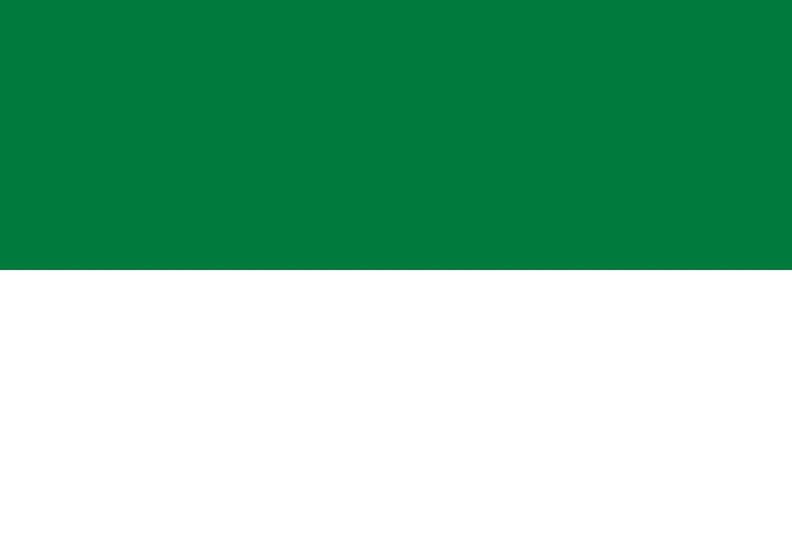
- Flag

- Location within Bolivia
- Coordinates: 17°10′S 65°55′W
- Country: Bolivia
- Department: Cochabamba Department
- Province: Chapare Province
- Seat: Colomi

Population (2001)
  - Total: 17,372
  - Ethnicities: Quechuas
- Time zone: UTC-4 (BOT)

Colomi Municipality is the second municipal section of the Chapare Province in the Cochabamba Department, Bolivia. Its seat is Colomi.

== See also ==
- Inkachaka
