= Colomi =

Colomi Qulumi
- Location of Colomi within Bolivia
- Coordinates: 17°21′0″S 65°52′0″W
- Country: Bolivia
- Department: Cochabamba Department
- Province: Chapare Province
- Municipality: Colomi Municipality
- Canton: Colomi Canton

Population (2001)
  - Total: 3,699
- Time zone: UTC-4 (BOT)

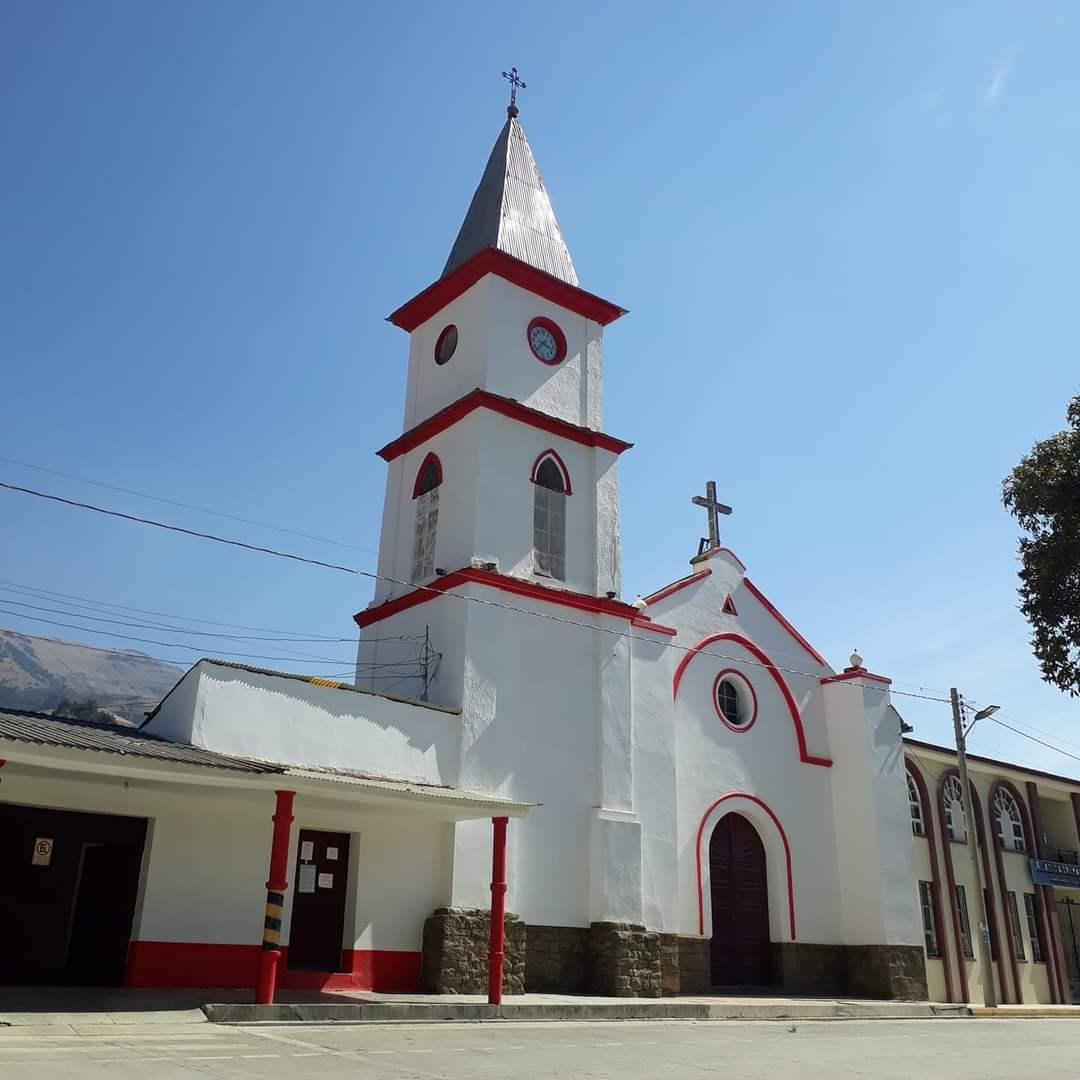
A church in Colomi

Colomi (Quechua: Qulumi) is a locality in the Cochabamba Department in central Bolivia. It is the seat of the Colomi Municipality, the second municipal section of the Chapare Province. At the time of census 2001 it had a population of 3,699.

In 2021, 21 people were killed in a bus crash.

== Climate ==
Climate data for Colomi, elevation 3,309 m (10,856 ft)
Month	Jan	Feb	Mar	Apr	May	Jun	Jul	Aug	Sep	Oct	Nov	Dec	Year
Mean daily maximum °C (°F)	14.7 (58.5)	14.8 (58.6)	14.9 (58.8)	15.1 (59.2)	15.2 (59.4)	15.6 (60.1)	14.8 (58.6)	15.1 (59.2)	15.2 (59.4)	15.3 (59.5)	15.3 (59.5)	15.6 (60.1)	15.1 (59.2)
Daily mean °C (°F)	10.1 (50.2)	10.4 (50.7)	10.4 (50.7)	10.3 (50.5)	8.8 (47.8)	7.6 (45.7)	7.0 (44.6)	8.0 (46.4)	8.6 (47.5)	9.3 (48.7)	10.2 (50.4)	10.2 (50.4)	9.2 (48.6)
Mean daily minimum °C (°F)	5.4 (41.7)	6.0 (42.8)	5.8 (42.4)	5.6 (42.1)	1.9 (35.4)	−0.6 (30.9)	−0.5 (31.1)	0.8 (33.4)	1.9 (35.4)	3.3 (37.9)	5.2 (41.4)	4.8 (40.6)	3.3 (37.9)
Average precipitation mm (inches)	144.7 (5.70)	107.7 (4.24)	83.3 (3.28)	26.7 (1.05)	6.8 (0.27)	7.1 (0.28)	13.8 (0.54)	7.4 (0.29)	22.0 (0.87)	29.5 (1.16)	36.0 (1.42)	98.1 (3.86)	583.1 (22.96)
Source: Servicio Nacional de Meteorología e Hidrología de Bolivia (precipitation 1999–2011)
