= Sacaba =

- City and Municipality
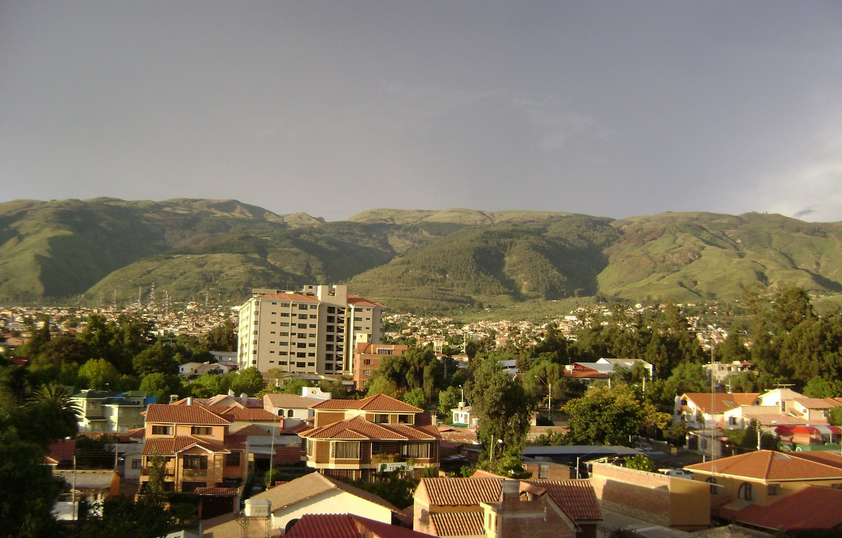

- Location within Bolivia
- Coordinates: 17°24′15″S 66°02′27″W
- Country: Bolivia
- Department: Cochabamba Department
- Province: Chapare Province
- Municipality: Sacaba Municipality
- Canton: Sacaba Canton
- Founded: June 29, 1761
- Elevation: 2,719 m (8,921 ft)

Population (2012 Census)
  - Urban: 149,570
- Time zone: UTC-4 (BOT)
- Postal code: 31001
- Area code: +591 4

Sacaba is a capital city and a municipality in the Bolivian province of Chapare. The city, located 13 km (8.1 mi) eastward from Cochabamba, is the second largest city in the Cochabamba Department after Cochabamba city. Post-colonial architecture may be seen in the inner part of Sacaba; however, some has been destroyed due to lack of municipal care.

Sacaba was the site of anti-coca eradication riots in 2002, which caused the removal of Evo Morales, leader of the cocalero movement and the MAS, from his seat in the Bolivian congress. Morales opposed the closing of a coca market in Sacaba, and ensuing protests involved the death of several people on both sides. Morales served as president of Bolivia between 2006 and 2019.

== Demographics ==
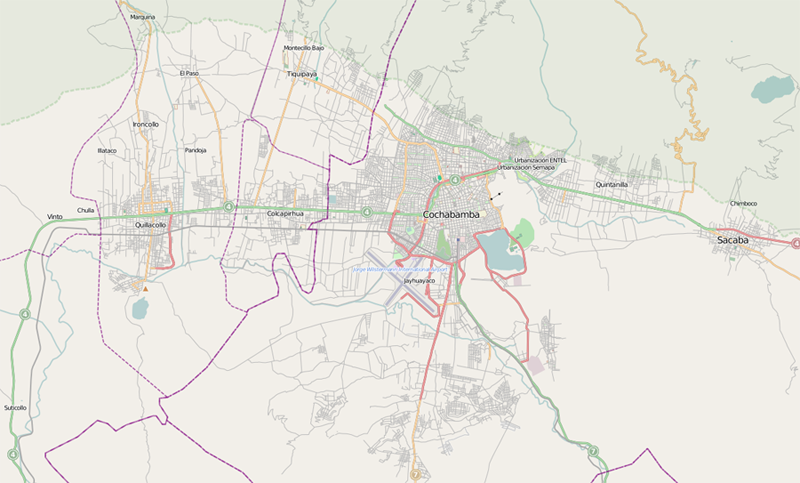
Map showing the location of Sacaba

At the time of census 2001 Sacaba had 92,581 residents. Due to the lack of space in Cochabamba city's boundaries, several new urbanization complexes have been built within the 13 km (8.1 mi) that separate Sacaba from Cochabamba city. Many of these residential complexes have been constructed for employees from enterprises based in the city.

== Climate ==
The weather in Sacaba is temperate, with a climate similar to Cochabamba city. During winter, temperatures range from 1 °C to 24 °C and rainfall is rare. During summer time, temperatures range from 10 °C to 19 °C with heavy precipitation.

Climate data for Sacaba, elevation 2,600 m (8,500 ft)
Month	Jan	Feb	Mar	Apr	May	Jun	Jul	Aug	Sep	Oct	Nov	Dec	Year
Mean daily maximum °C (°F)	25.2 (77.4)	24.8 (76.6)	25.5 (77.9)	26.7 (80.1)	25.4 (77.7)	24.4 (75.9)	24.2 (75.6)	25.3 (77.5)	26.3 (79.3)	27.2 (81.0)	27.4 (81.3)	26.0 (78.8)	25.7 (78.3)
Daily mean °C (°F)	18.7 (65.7)	18.4 (65.1)	18.3 (64.9)	18.2 (64.8)	16.0 (60.8)	14.4 (57.9)	14.7 (58.5)	15.9 (60.6)	17.7 (63.9)	19.0 (66.2)	19.6 (67.3)	19.1 (66.4)	17.5 (63.5)
Mean daily minimum °C (°F)	12.2 (54.0)	12.0 (53.6)	11.1 (52.0)	9.7 (49.5)	6.5 (43.7)	4.5 (40.1)	5.2 (41.4)	6.5 (43.7)	9.1 (48.4)	10.7 (51.3)	11.8 (53.2)	12.3 (54.1)	9.3 (48.8)
Average precipitation mm (inches)	109.6 (4.31)	94.3 (3.71)	59.9 (2.36)	16.0 (0.63)	2.9 (0.11)	0.9 (0.04)	3.6 (0.14)	8.2 (0.32)	9.0 (0.35)	17.5 (0.69)	40.9 (1.61)	82.6 (3.25)	445.4 (17.52)
Average precipitation days	12.0	11.0	7.5	2.4	0.8	0.2	0.8	1.3	1.8	2.5	5.5	9.4	55.2
Source: Servicio Nacional de Meteorología e Hidrología de Bolivia

== Economy ==
Sacaba is a culinary capital in Cochabamba, famous for its delicacies such as cuy and other gastronomical offerings. Several restaurants can be found on the city's streets. Sacaba is also famous for its many chicherias, which produce chicha or corn beer, leading to the description Sacaba – donde la chicha nunca se acaba or 'Sacaba, where the chicha never runs out'.

Most residents of Sacaba work in Cochabamba city. Local industries include raw food, cereal production, shoe factories, among others. Colonial buildings, public markets and other attractions are also appealing to tourists.
