= Q'ara Apachita (Chapare) =

Mountain in Bolivia

- Location within Bolivia

Highest point
- Elevation: 4,639 m (15,220 ft)
- Coordinates: 16°59′55″S 66°18′02″W

Geography
- Location: Bolivia, Cochabamba Department, Chapare Province
- Parent range: Andes

Q'ara Apachita (Aymara q'ara bare, bald, apachita the place of transit of an important pass in the principal routes of the Andes; name in the Andes for a stone cairn, a little pile of rocks built along the trail in the high mountains, "bare apachita", also spelled Khara Apacheta) is a 4,639 m (15,220 ft) mountain in the Bolivian Andes. It is located in the Cochabamba Department, Chapare Province, Villa Tunari Municipality.
