= Inkachaka =

Archaeological site in Bolivia

- Interactive map of Inkachaka
- 17°14′18″S 65°48′44″W
- Location: Bolivia, Cochabamba Department, Chapare Province, Colomi Municipality
- Region: Andes

Inkachaka or Inka Chaka (Quechua Inka Inca, chaka bridge, "Inca bridge", hispanicized spellings Incachaca, Inca Chaca) is an archaeological site in Bolivia. It is situated in the Cochabamba Department, Chapare Province, Colomi Municipality. The site was declared a Cultural Heritage of Bolivia by Law 2533 on October 24, 2003.
