= Q'inqu Mayu =

- Etymology: Quechua

Location
- Country: Bolivia
- Region: Cochabamba Department, Chapare Province

Q'inqu Mayu (Quechua q'inqu zig-zag, mayu river, "zig-zag river", hispanicized spellings Kenko Mayu, Khenko Mayu) is a Bolivian river in the Cochabamba Department, Chapare Province. Since 1991, it is the eastern border of Tunari National Park.
