= Parotani =

- Town
- Location within Bolivia
- Coordinates: 17°34′S 66°21′W
- Country: Bolivia
- Department: Cochabamba Department
- Province: Quillacollo Province
- Municipality: Sipe Sipe Municipality

Population (2001)
  - Total: 1,908
- Time zone: UTC-4 (BOT)

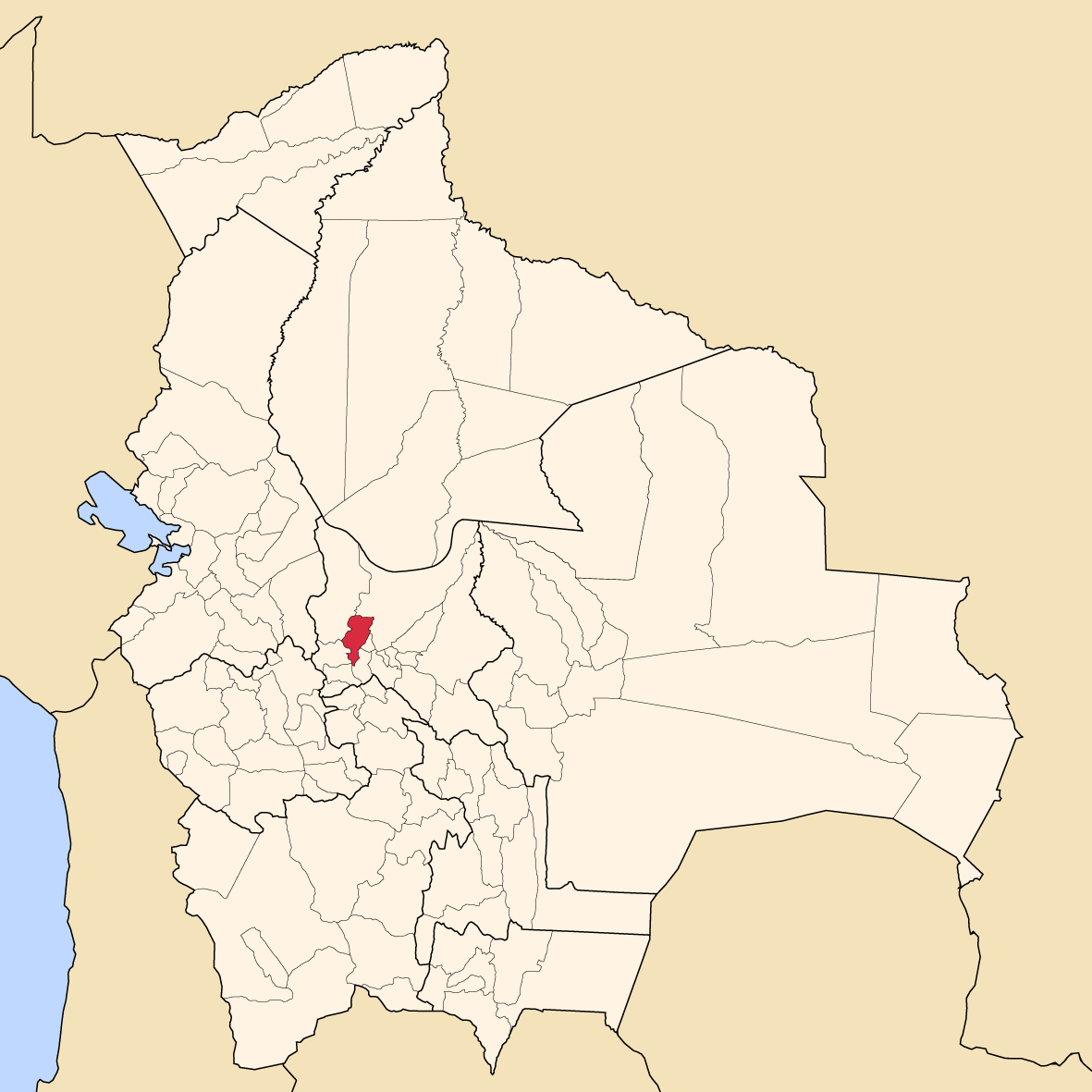
Quillacollo Province in Bolivia, where Parotani is

Parotani is a small town in Bolivia.
