= Alalay Lake =

Body of water

Laguna Alalay
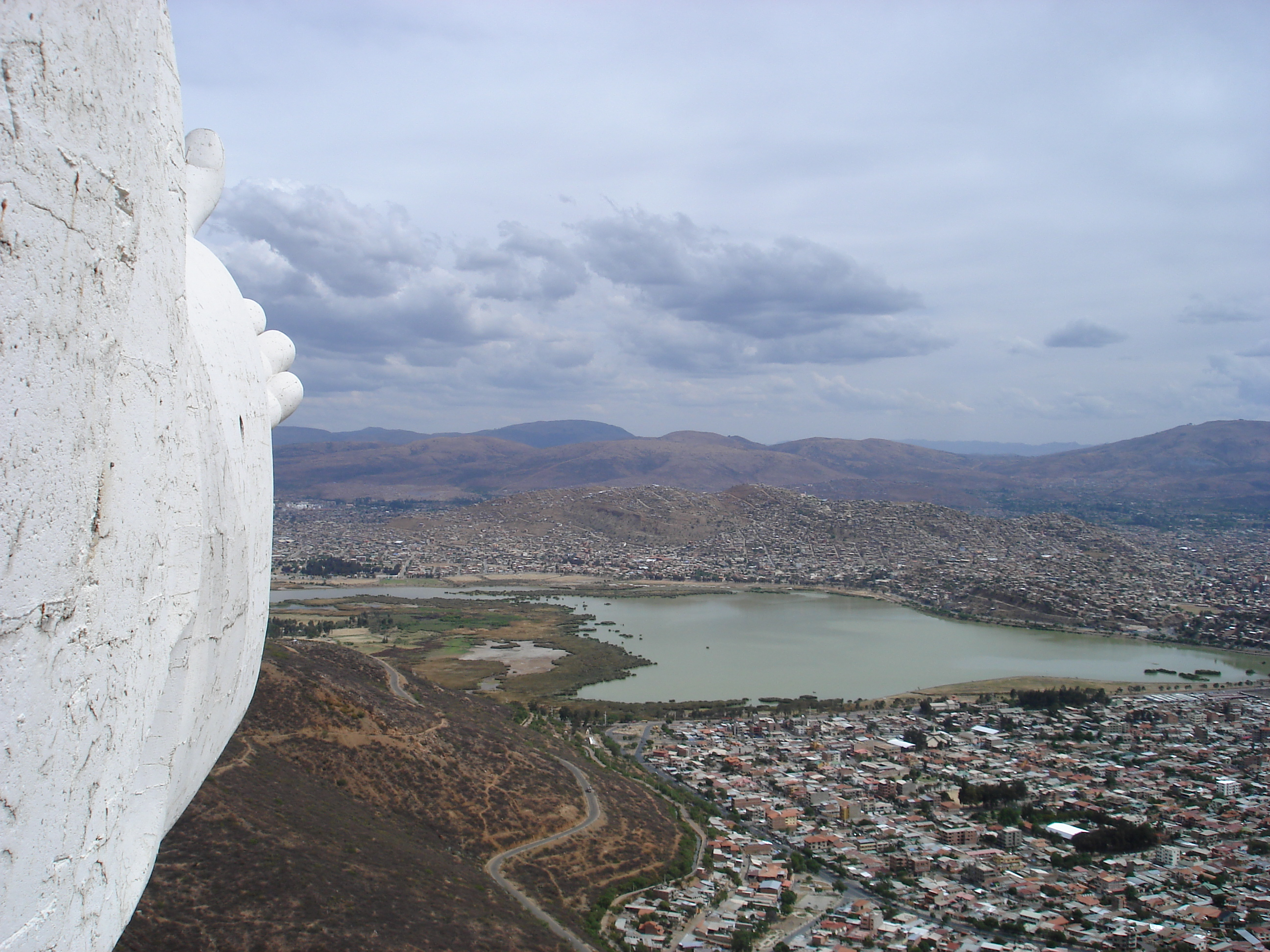

- Location within Cochabamba Location within Bolivia Location within South America
- Interactive map of Laguna Alalay
- Location: Cochabamba Department
- Coordinates: 17°24′21.7″S 66°08′23.4″W
- Basin countries: Bolivia
- Surface area: 2.4 km^{2} (0.93 sq mi)
- Max. depth: 5 m (16 ft)
- Surface elevation: 3,686 m (12,093 ft)
- Islands: none

Laguna Alalay is a lake in the Cochabamba Department, Bolivia. At an elevation of 2570 m, its surface area is 2.4 km^{2}. The lake has a flood control dam that regulates floods of the Rocha River. The lake perimeter features a bicycle path and jogging track called circuit Bolivia (Circuito Bolivia).

During the late 20th century, the lake experienced increasing pollution relating to urbanization of the surrounding Cochabamba area leading to eutrophication of the lake. In 1997, a restoration effort was undertaken to remove sediment from the lake, and in 2004 and 2005, floating macrophytes were removed from the lake for use as fertilizer. It was during the same 1997 effort that the bicycle path, bird observatory, and waterfowl conservation area were established. The lake is known for its high diversity of waterfowl.

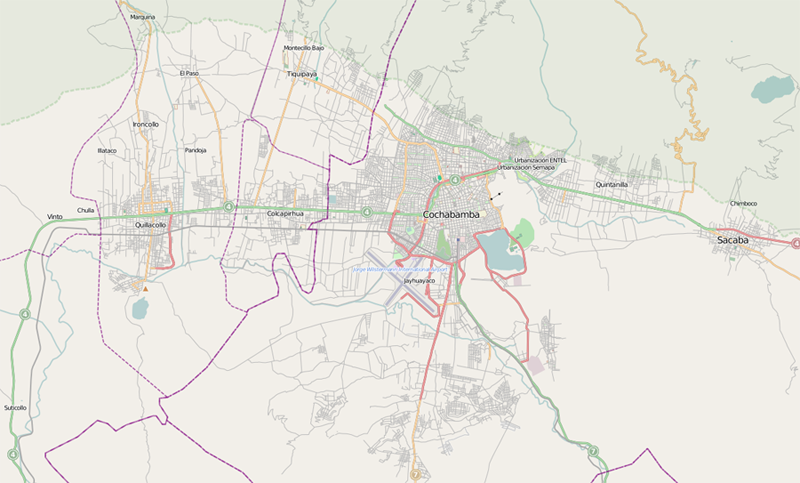
Map of Cochabamba showing Alalay Lake in the south east of the town

== See also ==
- Warawara Lake
