= Villa Tunari Municipality =

- Municipality
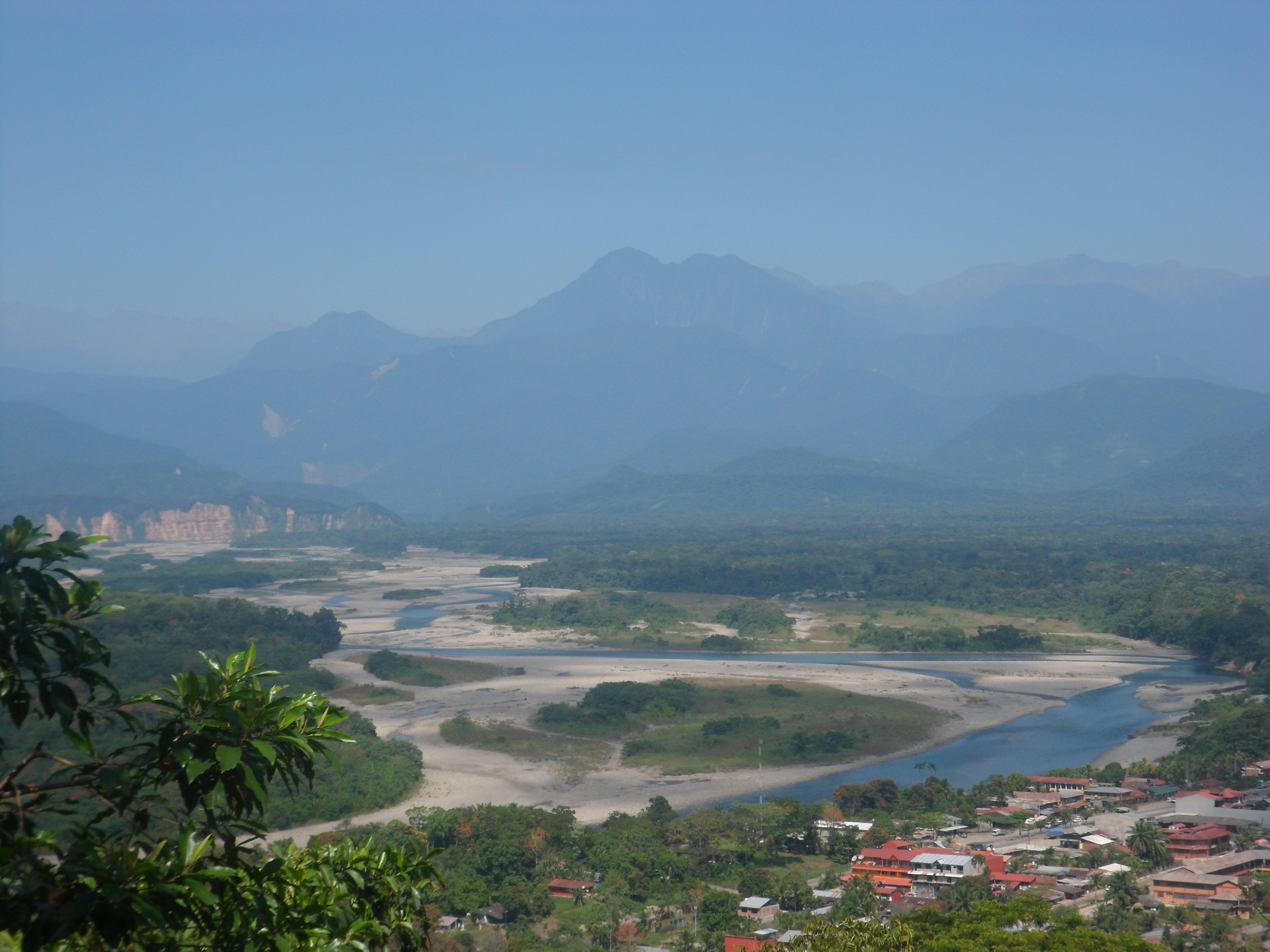
- Villa Tunari

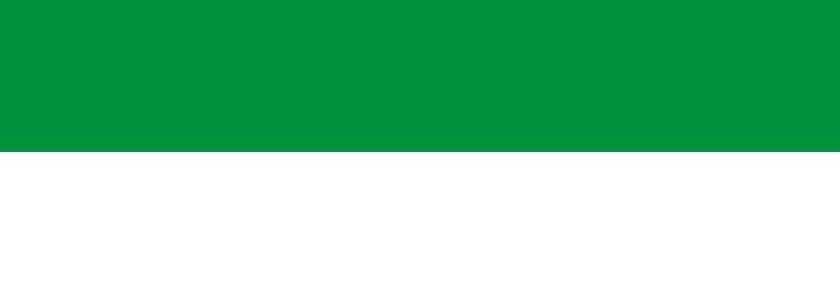
- Flag

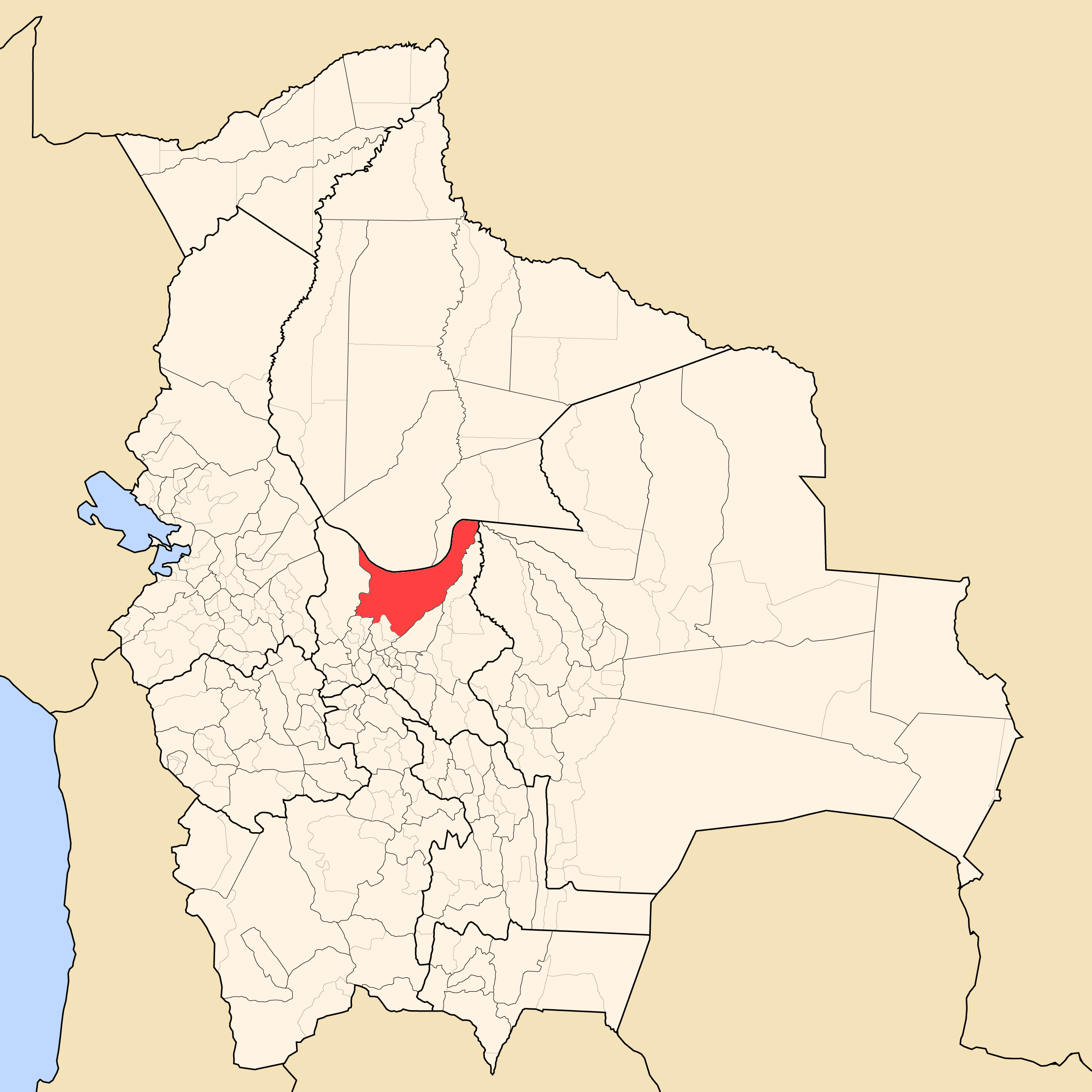
- Coordinates: 16°50′S 65°40′W
- Country: Bolivia
- Department: Cochabamba Department
- Province: Chapare Province
- Recognized (municipal section): 4 June 1970
- Seat: Villa Tunari

Population (2012)
  - Total: 71,146
  - Ethnicities: Quechuas
- Time zone: UTC-4 (BOT)

Villa Tunari Municipality is the third municipal section of the Chapare Province in the Cochabamba Department, Bolivia. Its seat is Villa Tunari. The population grew from 52,886 to 71,146 during 2001 to 2012 according to the census. Only 8,692 of the population are urban and are concentrated in the small towns of Villa Tunari (3.213), Eterazama (3,359) and Villa 14 the Septiembre (2,123). The municipality is famous for tourist especially the Villa Tunari town where the tourist industry is concentrated with infrastructure, and also because of the closeness of the Machia Park.

== See also ==
- Isiboro Sécure National Park and Indigenous Territory
- Q'ara Apachita
- Uqi Salli Punta
- Villa Tunari – San Ignacio de Moxos Highway
