= Cocalero =

Coca leaf grower

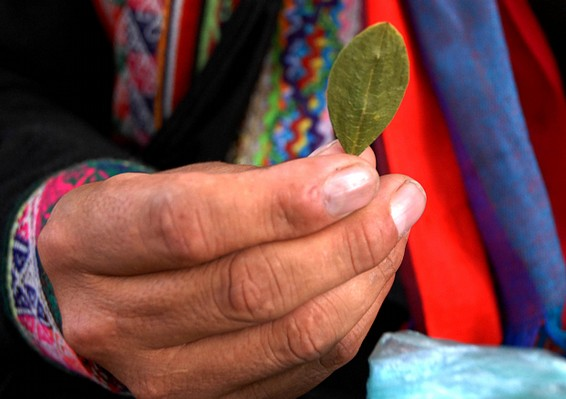
Coca leaf

Cocaleros (Spanish pronunciation: [kokaˈleɾo]) are the coca leaf growers of Bolivia, Colombia, and Peru. In response to U.S.-funded attempts to eradicate and fumigate coca crops in the Chapare region of Bolivia, cocaleros joined with other grassroots indigenous organizations in the country, such as unionized mine workers and peasants to contest the government. Evo Morales, who became president of Bolivia in 2006, was a leader in the national cocalero movement.

== Coca and the war on drugs ==
Coca has been cultivated for 8,000 years by indigenous people in the Andes for medicinal and religious reasons. As a stimulant, it is helpful in overcoming altitude sickness in the high Andes, and can be chewed and made into tea. Other medicinal uses include pain relief, staunching blood flow, combating malaria, ulcers, asthma and improving digestion. It is also configured in many religious ceremonies as offerings to Apus, Inti, and the Pachamama and as a method of divination.

It was introduced to Europe in the 16th century, but it was not until the mid-19th century that it began to be refined into cocaine. Its cultivation was prohibited by Bolivian law, except in the region of Yungas despite its affinity to the climate and land of the Chapare region. Coca crops in Chapare were thus targeted for eradication. Because coca and cocaine were being trafficked up through South and Central America to the United States, coca production in South America came to the attention of the U.S. Drug Enforcement Administration, which, subsequently under Plan Colombia, began to fund eradication efforts across the continent. Plan Colombia sent hundreds of millions of dollars in military aid, training and equipment to Central and South American countries, thereby militarizing the region and local and national governments' responses to coca production. Cocaleros who make their livings growing and selling coca were the most negatively affected by the policies, as their crops were burned, ripped up, or sprayed with herbicide.

Coca producers are left with few alternatives for subsistence, and therefore call for the legalization of coca. Also the anti-drug militancy has targeted left wing guerrilla groups like the Revolutionary Armed Forces of Colombia and gangs who are involved in the drug trade. In 1987, UMOPAR, La Unidad Móvil Policial para Áreas Rurales, was formed as an anti-narcotic counterinsurgency force in Bolivia. It received training and monetary aid from the DEA and led raids on coca fields and suppressed cocalero organizing.

== Indigenous organizing in Bolivia ==
Bolivia is a multiethnic nation, being home to over three dozen Amerindian nations, with the most prominent being the Quechuas, Aymaras, Chiquitanos, Guaranís, and Mojeños. White and mestizo Bolivians historically held power within Bolivia, with indigenous people frequently employed in mines that would export the nation's mineral wealth to Spain and later the United States and Western Europe after gaining independence in 1809.

In the 1980s, the Bolivian Mining Corporation closed many mines, which forced many former miners into coca production. Not only did coca farming provide a living for the ex-miners, but the turn from wage labor to farming allowed for more political organization. Many of the organizations formed during this time period such as the Confederation of Indigenous Peoples of Bolivia later joined forces with the Confederación Sindical Única de Trabajadores Campesinos de Bolivia and the Confederación Sindical de Colonizadores de Bolivia to form the beginnings of the Movimiento al Socialismo, the Party of Evo Morales. Among major mobilizations since its inception, the Confederation of Indigenous Peoples of Bolivia has played a part in marches for land reform, indigenous autonomy, and for a plurinational state.

== Cocaleros and the MAS Party ==
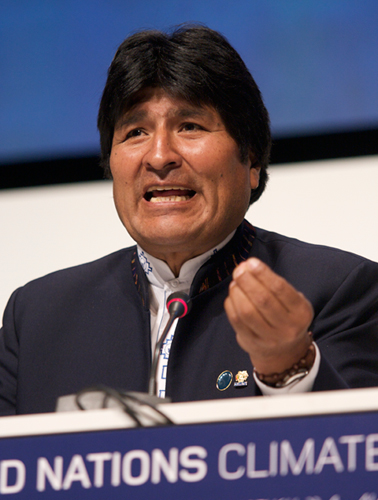
Evo Morales

Movement for Socialism - Political Instrument for the Sovereignty of the Peoples (In Spanish Movimiento al Socialismo-Instrumento Político por la Soberanía de los Pueblos) or MAS rose as a left-wing populist political organization to support the preservation of the coca plant and the cocalero economy. It grew out of and gained support from the indigenous grassroots organizations that began to coalesce following the closure of mines and the criminalization of the coca plant and indigenous cocaleros.

Carlos Mesa, the president of Bolivia from October 17, 2003 to June 6, 2005, presided over several controversies that mobilized the indigenous grassroots organizations against the government, notably the Bolivian gas conflict which drew momentum from the Cochabamba Water Wars. Both of these conflicts centered on disputes between the indigenous population and the government over control of resources. Mesa hastily resigned, opening up the country for elections. The momentum of the MAS party led to the successful election of Evo Morales, a cocalero union organizer, with a 54% absolute majority.

In the lead up to the 2025 Bolivian general election, Evo Morales allied with local Cocaleros known as the "Six Federations" in Chapare province, where he was based in a fortified compound to direct protests against Luis Arce in protest of the Bolivian state ruling that Morales could not run. The Cocaleros supported Morales in this endeavour and pledged to wage a guerrilla war in support of Morales if right-wing candidates win and attempt to arrest him.
