= Chapare Province =

Province in Bolivia

Provincia Chapare
- Province
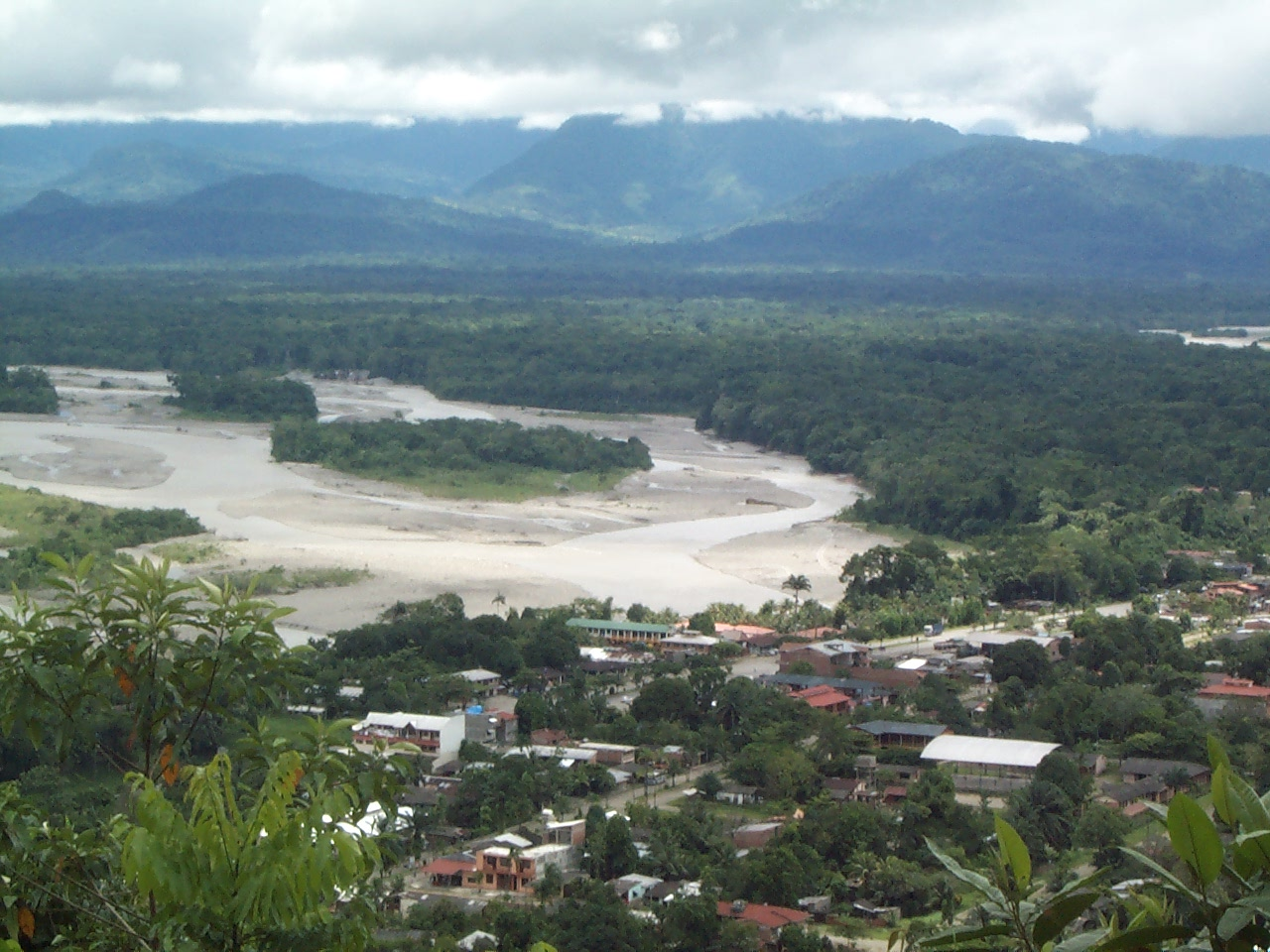
- Villa Tunari on Chapare River
- Interactive map of Provincia Chapare
- Coordinates: 16°50′S 66°10′W
- Country: Bolivia
- Department: Cochabamba

Area
  - Total: 12,445 km^{2} (4,805 sq mi)
- Elevation: 241 m (791 ft)

Population (2024)
  - Total: 333,408
  - Density: 26.791/km^{2} (69.387/sq mi)
- ISO 3166 code: BO.CB.CH

Chapare (Spanish: [tʃaˈpaɾe], also called The Chapare, is a rural province in the northern region of Cochabamba Department in central Bolivia. Most of the territory consists of valley rainforests that surround the area's main waterway, the Chapare River, which is also a tributary of the Amazon River. The provincial capital is Sacaba, 11 km east of Cochabamba. Its principal town is Villa Tunari, a popular tourist destination.

In recent decades, the Chapare province has become a haven for illegal cultivation of the coca plant, which can be used to produce cocaine. This is due to Bolivian drug law, which until recently only permitted the Yungas region to legally grow coca, despite Chapare being a historical area for growth due to its fertility. For this reason, Chapare has been a primary target for coca eradication in recent years, with frequent and heated clashes between the U.S. Drug Enforcement Administration and Bolivian cocaleros. The law has since been changed by a deal that was struck between Evo Morales (a former coca activist and the country's first indigenous President (2006–2019)) and former President Carlos Mesa. This deal permits the region to grow a limited amount of coca every year .

Languages spoken in Chapare include Quechua, Spanish, Aymara, and Yuracaré.

== Subdivision ==
Chapare Province is divided into three municipalities which are further subdivided into thirteen cantons.

Section	Municipality	Seat
1st	Sacaba Municipality	Sacaba
2nd	Colomi Municipality	Colomi
3rd	Villa Tunari Municipality	Villa Tunari

== Places of interest ==
- Carrasco National Park
- Inkachaka
- Isiboro Sécure National Park and Indigenous Territory
- Tunari National Park

== Safety ==
The United Kingdom's Foreign, Commonwealth and Development Office currently (as of August 2025) warns against "all but essential travel" to or through the Chapare region.

== See also ==
- Chapare mammarenavirus
- Q'ara Apachita
- Q'inqu Mayu
- Uqi Salli Punta
- Villa Tunari – San Ignacio de Moxos Highway
