= Tunari National Park =

National park in Bolivia

- IUCN category II (national park)
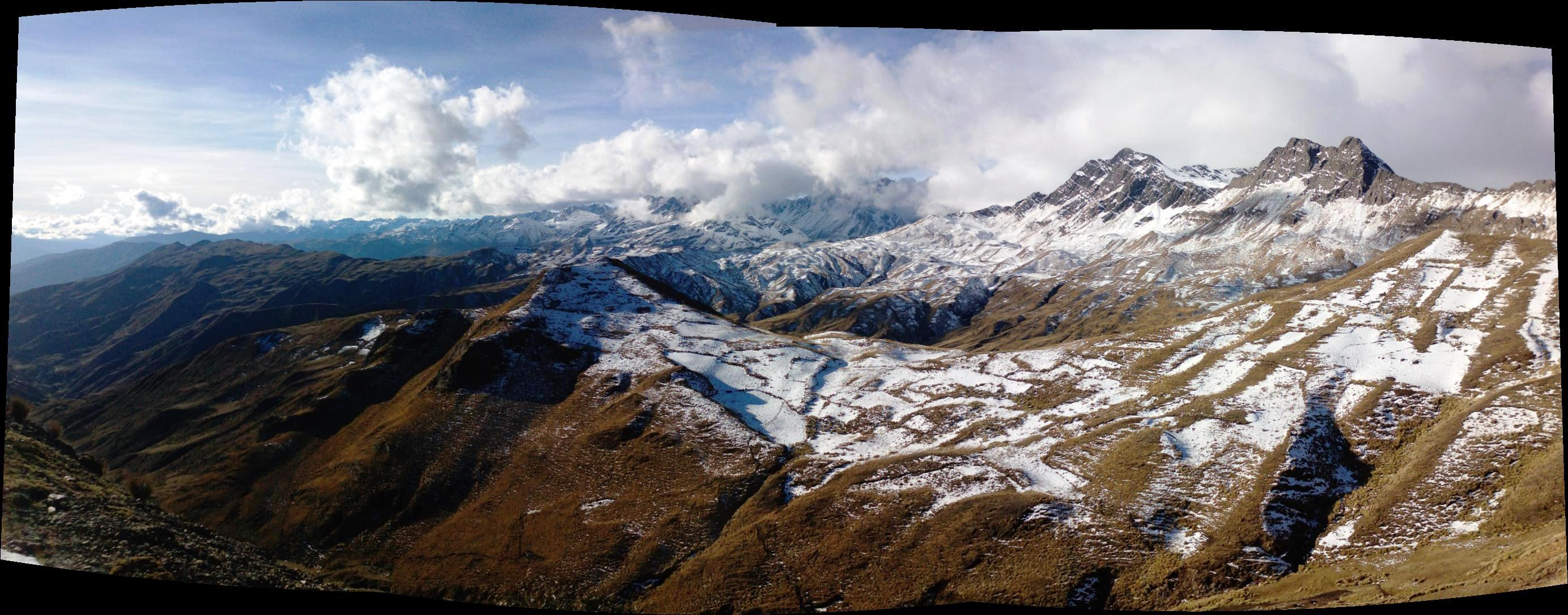
- Tunari Mountain Range
- Interactive map of Tunari National Park
- Location: Bolivia; Cochabamba Department
- Coordinates: 17°15′0″S 66°20′0″W
- Area: ca. 3,090 km^{2}
- Established: 1992
- Governing body: Servicio Nacional de Áreas Protegidas (SENAP)

Tunari National Park is a national park located in the Cochabamba Department, Bolivia. When the Misicuni Dam floods the area, the park will also be flooded.

== See also ==
- Warawara Lake
