= Outline of Bolivia =

Country in South America

The Flag of Bolivia

The Coat of arms of Bolivia

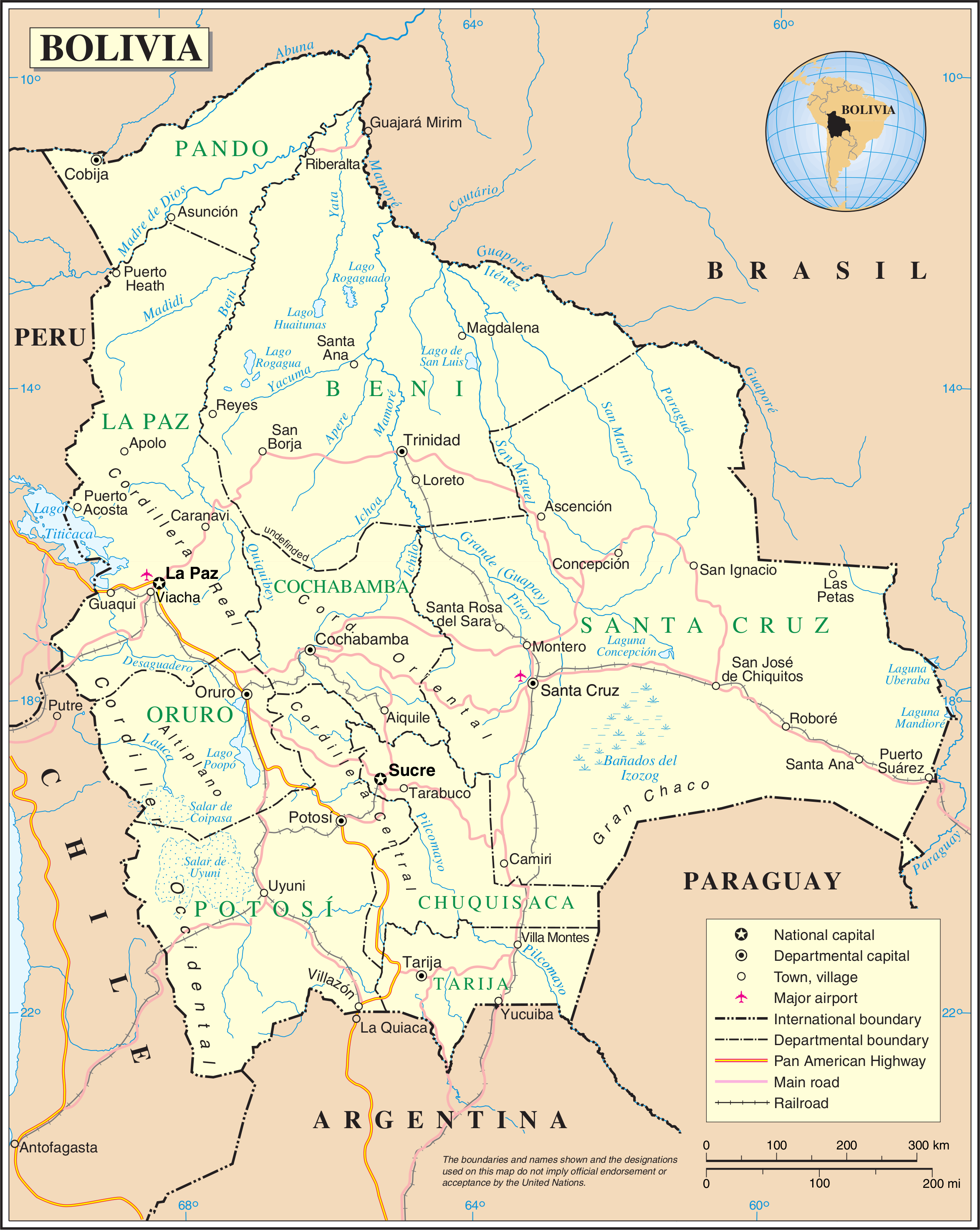
An enlargeable map of Bolivia

The following outline is provided as an overview of and topical guide to Bolivia:

Bolivia – landlocked sovereign country located in central South America. It is bordered on the north and the east by Brazil, on the southeast by Paraguay, on the south by Argentina, and on the west by Chile and Peru. Its geography varies from the peaks of the Andes mountains to the tropical forests of the Amazon Basin. It is a developing country, and its main economic activities include agriculture, mining, and manufacturing of products such as textiles.

== General reference ==
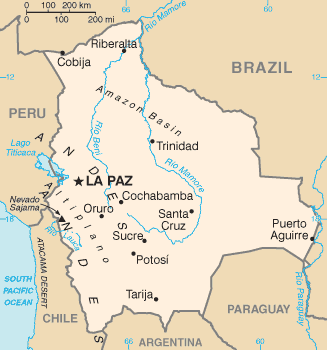
An enlargeable basic map of Bolivia

- Pronunciation:
- Common English country name: Bolivia
- Official English country name: The Plurinational State of Bolivia
- Adjective: Bolivian
- Demonym(s):
- Etymology: Name of Bolivia
- International rankings of Bolivia
- ISO country codes: BO, BOL, 068
- ISO region codes: See ISO 3166-2:BO
- Internet country code top-level domain: .bo

== Geography of Bolivia ==
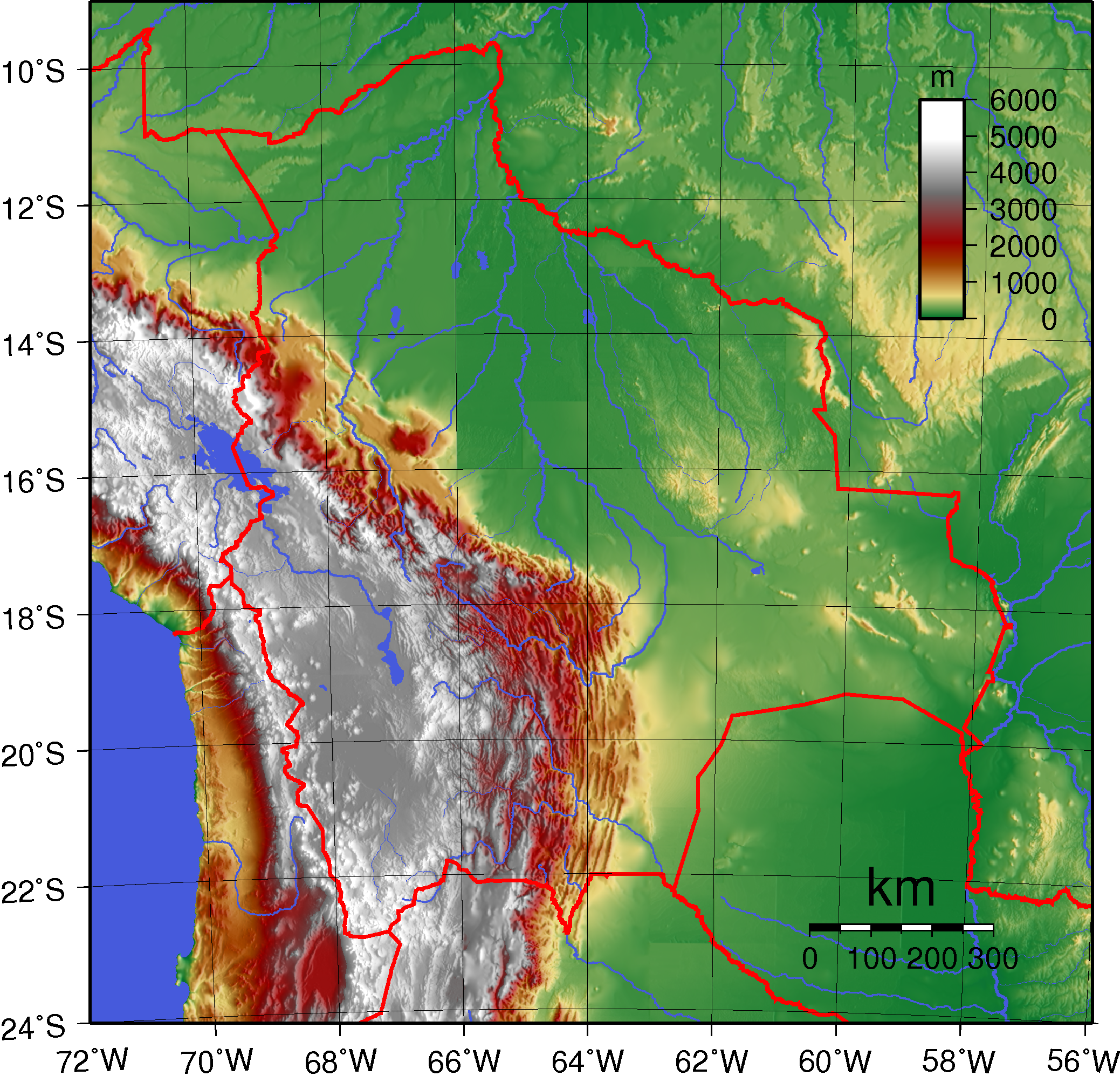
An enlargeable topographic map of Bolivia

Geography of Bolivia

- Bolivia is: a landlocked country
- Location:
  - Southern Hemisphere
  - Western Hemisphere
    - South America
  - Time zone: UTC-04
  - Extreme points of Bolivia
    - High: Nevado Sajama 6,542 m (21,463 ft)
    - Low: Rio Paraguay 90 m (295 ft)
  - Land boundaries: 6,940 km

Brazil 3,423 km
Peru 1,075 km
Chile 860 km
Argentina 832 km
Paraguay 750 km

- Coastline: none

- Population: 9,119,152(2007) - 84th
- Area: 1,098,581 square kilometres (424,164 sq mi) - 28th largest country
- Atlas of Bolivia

=== Environment of Bolivia ===
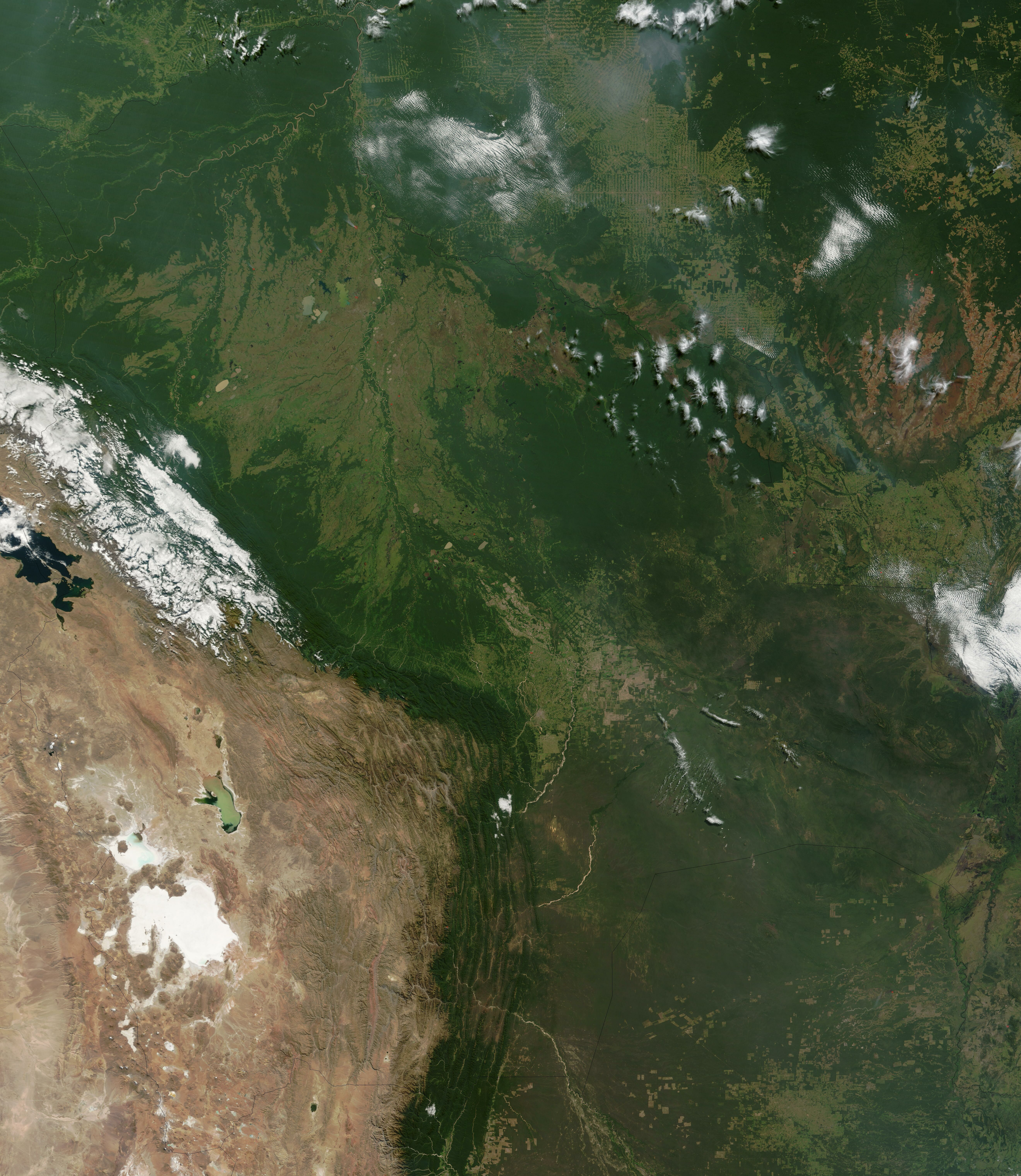
An enlargeable satellite map of Bolivia

Environment of Bolivia (currently redirects to "Environmental issues…")

- Climate of Bolivia
- Environmental issues in Bolivia
- Renewable energy in Bolivia
- Geology of Bolivia
- Protected areas of Bolivia
  - Biosphere reserves in Bolivia
  - National parks of Bolivia
- Wildlife of Bolivia
  - Fauna of Bolivia
    - Birds of Bolivia
    - Mammals of Bolivia

==== Natural geographic features of Bolivia ====
- Glaciers of Bolivia
- Islands of Bolivia
- Lakes of Bolivia
- Mountains of Bolivia
  - Volcanoes in Bolivia
- Rivers of Bolivia
- World Heritage Sites in Bolivia

=== Regions of Bolivia ===
Regions of Bolivia

==== Ecoregions of Bolivia ====
List of ecoregions in Bolivia

==== Administrative divisions of Bolivia ====
Administrative divisions of Bolivia

- Departments of Bolivia
  - Provinces of Bolivia
    - Municipalities of Bolivia

===== Departments of Bolivia =====
Departments of Bolivia Bolivia is divided into 9 departments These are (with their capitals indicated in parentheses):

- Beni (Trinidad)
- Chuquisaca (Sucre)
- Cochabamba (Cochabamba)
- La Paz (La Paz)
- Oruro (Oruro)
- Pando (Cobija)
- Potosí (Potosí)
- Santa Cruz (Santa Cruz de la Sierra)
- Tarija (Tarija)

===== Provinces of Bolivia =====
Provinces of Bolivia Bolivia is divided into 100 provinces, which are listed by department below:

Beni Department

- Cercado
- Iténez
- José Ballivián
- Mamoré
- Marbán
- Moxos
- Vaca Diez
- Yacuma

Chuquisaca Department

- Belisario Boeto
- Hernando Siles
- Jaime Zudáñez
- Juana Azurduay de Padilla
- Luis Calvo
- Nor Cinti
- Oropeza
- Sud Cinti
- Tomina
- Yamparáez

Cochabamba Department

- Arani
- Arque
- Ayopaya
- Capinota
- Carrasco
- Cercado
- Chapare
- Esteban Arce
- Germán Jordán
- Mizque
- Narciso Campero
- Punata
- Quillacollo
- Tapacarí

La Paz Department

- Abel Iturralde
- Aroma
- Bautista Saavedra
- Caranavi
- Eliodoro Camacho
- Franz Tamayo
- Gualberto Villarroel
- Ingavi
- Inquisivi
- José Manuel Pando
- Larecaja
- Loayza
- Los Andes
- Manco Kapac
- Muñecas
- Nor Yungas
- Omasuyos
- Pacajes
- Pedro Domingo Murillo
- Sud Yungas

Oruro Department

- Atahuallpa
- Cercado
- Eduardo Avaroa
- Ladislao Cabrera
- Poopó
- Litoral
- Nor Carangas
- Pantaléon Dalence
- Sajama
- Saucarí

Pando Department

- Abuná
- Federico Román
- Madre de Dios
- Manuripi
- Nicolás Suárez

Potosí Department

- Alonso de Ibáñez
- Antonio Quijarro
- Bernardino Bilbao
- Charcas
- Chayanta
- Cornelio Saavedra
- Daniel Campos
- José María Linares
- Modesto Omiste
- Nor Chichas
- Nor Lípez
- Rafael Bustillo
- Sud Chichas
- Sud Lípez
- Tomás Frías

Santa Cruz Department

- Andrés Ibáñez
- Ángel Sandoval
- Chiquitos
- Cordillera
- Florida
- Gutierrez
- Ichilo
- Ignacio Warnes Province
- José Miguel de Velasco
- Manuel María Caballero
- Ñuflo de Chávez
- Obispo Santistevan
- Vallegrande

Tarija Department

- Aniceto Arce
- Burnet O'Connor
- Cercado
- Eustaquio Méndez
- Gran Chaco
- José María Avilés

===== Municipalities of Bolivia =====
Municipalities of Bolivia

- Capital of Bolivia: Sucre C.S.
- Cities of Bolivia

=== Demography of Bolivia ===
Demographics of Bolivia

== Government and politics of Bolivia ==
Politics of Bolivia

- Form of government: presidential representative democratic republic
- Capital of Bolivia: Sucre
- Elections in Bolivia
- Political parties in Bolivia

=== Branches of government ===
Government of Bolivia

- Constitution of Bolivia
  - Bolivian Constituent Assembly

==== Executive branch of the government of Bolivia ====
- Head of state: President of Bolivia, Rodrigo Paz Pereira
- Head of government: President of Bolivia, Rodrigo Paz Pereira
- Cabinet of Bolivia

==== Legislative branch of the government of Bolivia ====
- Plurinational Legislative Assembly (formerly National Congress of Bolivia) (bicameral)
  - Upper house: Senate of Bolivia
  - Lower house: Chamber of Deputies of Bolivia

==== Judicial branch of the government of Bolivia ====
Court system of Bolivia

- Supreme Court of Bolivia - its judges are appointed for 10-year terms by the National Congress

==== Electoral branch of the government of Bolivia ====
- Supreme Electoral Tribunal of Bolivia (formerly, National Electoral Court of Bolivia

=== Foreign relations of Bolivia ===
Foreign relations of Bolivia

- Diplomatic missions in Bolivia
- Diplomatic missions of Bolivia

==== International organization membership ====
The Republic of Bolivia is a member of:

- Agency for the Prohibition of Nuclear Weapons in Latin America and the Caribbean (OPANAL)
- Andean Community of Nations (CAN)
- Food and Agriculture Organization (FAO)
- Group of 77 (G77)
- Inter-American Development Bank (IADB)
- International Atomic Energy Agency (IAEA)
- International Bank for Reconstruction and Development (IBRD)
- International Civil Aviation Organization (ICAO)
- International Criminal Court (ICCt)
- International Criminal Police Organization (Interpol)
- International Development Association (IDA)
- International Federation of Red Cross and Red Crescent Societies (IFRCS)
- International Finance Corporation (IFC)
- International Fund for Agricultural Development (IFAD)
- International Labour Organization (ILO)
- International Maritime Organization (IMO)
- International Monetary Fund (IMF)
- International Olympic Committee (IOC)
- International Organization for Migration (IOM)
- International Organization for Standardization (ISO) (correspondent)
- International Red Cross and Red Crescent Movement (ICRM)
- International Telecommunication Union (ITU)
- International Telecommunications Satellite Organization (ITSO)
- Inter-Parliamentary Union (IPU)
- Latin American Economic System (LAES)
- Latin American Integration Association (LAIA)
- Multilateral Investment Guarantee Agency (MIGA)
- Nonaligned Movement (NAM)
- Organisation for the Prohibition of Chemical Weapons (OPCW)
- Organization of American States (OAS)
- Permanent Court of Arbitration (PCA)
- Rio Group (RG)
- Southern Cone Common Market (Mercosur) (associate)
- Unión Latina
- Union of South American Nations (UNASUR)
- United Nations (UN)
- United Nations Conference on Trade and Development (UNCTAD)
- United Nations Educational, Scientific, and Cultural Organization (UNESCO)
- United Nations Industrial Development Organization (UNIDO)
- United Nations Mission in Liberia (UNMIL)
- United Nations Mission in the Central African Republic and Chad (MINURCAT)
- United Nations Mission in the Sudan (UNMIS)
- United Nations Operation in Cote d'Ivoire (UNOCI)
- United Nations Organization Mission in the Democratic Republic of the Congo (MONUC)
- United Nations Peacekeeping Force in Cyprus (UNFICYP)
- United Nations Stabilization Mission in Haiti (MINUSTAH)
- Universal Postal Union (UPU)
- World Confederation of Labour (WCL)
- World Customs Organization (WCO)
- World Federation of Trade Unions (WFTU)
- World Health Organization (WHO)
- World Intellectual Property Organization (WIPO)
- World Meteorological Organization (WMO)
- World Tourism Organization (UNWTO)
- World Trade Organization (WTO)

=== Law and order in Bolivia ===
Law of Bolivia

- Constitution of Bolivia
- Crime in Bolivia
- Human rights in Bolivia
  - LGBT rights in Bolivia
- Law enforcement in Bolivia

=== Military of Bolivia ===
Military of Bolivia

- Command
  - Commander-in-chief
- Forces
  - Army of Bolivia
  - Navy of Bolivia
  - Air Force of Bolivia
- Military ranks of Bolivia

=== Local government in Bolivia ===
Local government in Bolivia

== History of Bolivia ==
History of Bolivia

- Timeline of the history of Bolivia
- Current events of Bolivia

== Culture of Bolivia ==
Culture of Bolivia

- Architecture of Bolivia
- Cuisine of Bolivia
- Languages of Bolivia
- Media in Bolivia
- National symbols of Bolivia
  - Coat of arms of Bolivia
  - Flag of Bolivia
  - National anthem of Bolivia
- People of Bolivia
- Prostitution in Bolivia
- Public holidays in Bolivia
- Religion in Bolivia
  - Christianity in Bolivia
  - Hinduism in Bolivia
  - Islam in Bolivia
  - Judaism in Bolivia
- World Heritage Sites in Bolivia

=== Art in Bolivia ===
- Cinema of Bolivia
- Literature of Bolivia
- Music of Bolivia

=== Sports in Bolivia ===
Sports in Bolivia

- Football in Bolivia
- Bolivia at the Olympics

== Economy and infrastructure of Bolivia ==
Economy of Bolivia

- Economic rank, by nominal GDP (2007): 104th (one hundred and fourth)
- Agriculture in Bolivia
- Communications in Bolivia
  - Internet in Bolivia
- Companies of Bolivia
- Currency of Bolivia: Boliviano
  - ISO 4217: BOB
- Energy in Bolivia
- Health care in Bolivia
- Mining in Bolivia
- Tourism in Bolivia
- Transport in Bolivia
  - Airports in Bolivia
  - Rail transport in Bolivia
- Water supply and sanitation in Bolivia

== Education in Bolivia ==
Education in Bolivia

== Health in Bolivia ==
Health in Bolivia

== See also ==
- Index of Bolivia-related articles
- List of Bolivia-related topics
- List of international rankings
- Member state of the United Nations
- Outline of geography
- Outline of South America
