= Toco (disambiguation) =

Toco is a village on the island of Trinidad.

Toco or Tocos may also refer to:

== Places ==
- Toco Municipality, a municipal section in Bolivia
  - Toco, Cochabamba, a town in Toco Municipality
- Toco, Texas, a city in the United States
- Tocos do Moji, a municipality in Brazil
- Toco Hills, a neighborhood in North Druid Hills, Georgia

== Other ==
- Toco toucan, a species of bird
- Cardiotocograph, a type of hospital equipment
- Tocos, an alternative name for rice bran solubles
