= Cliza =

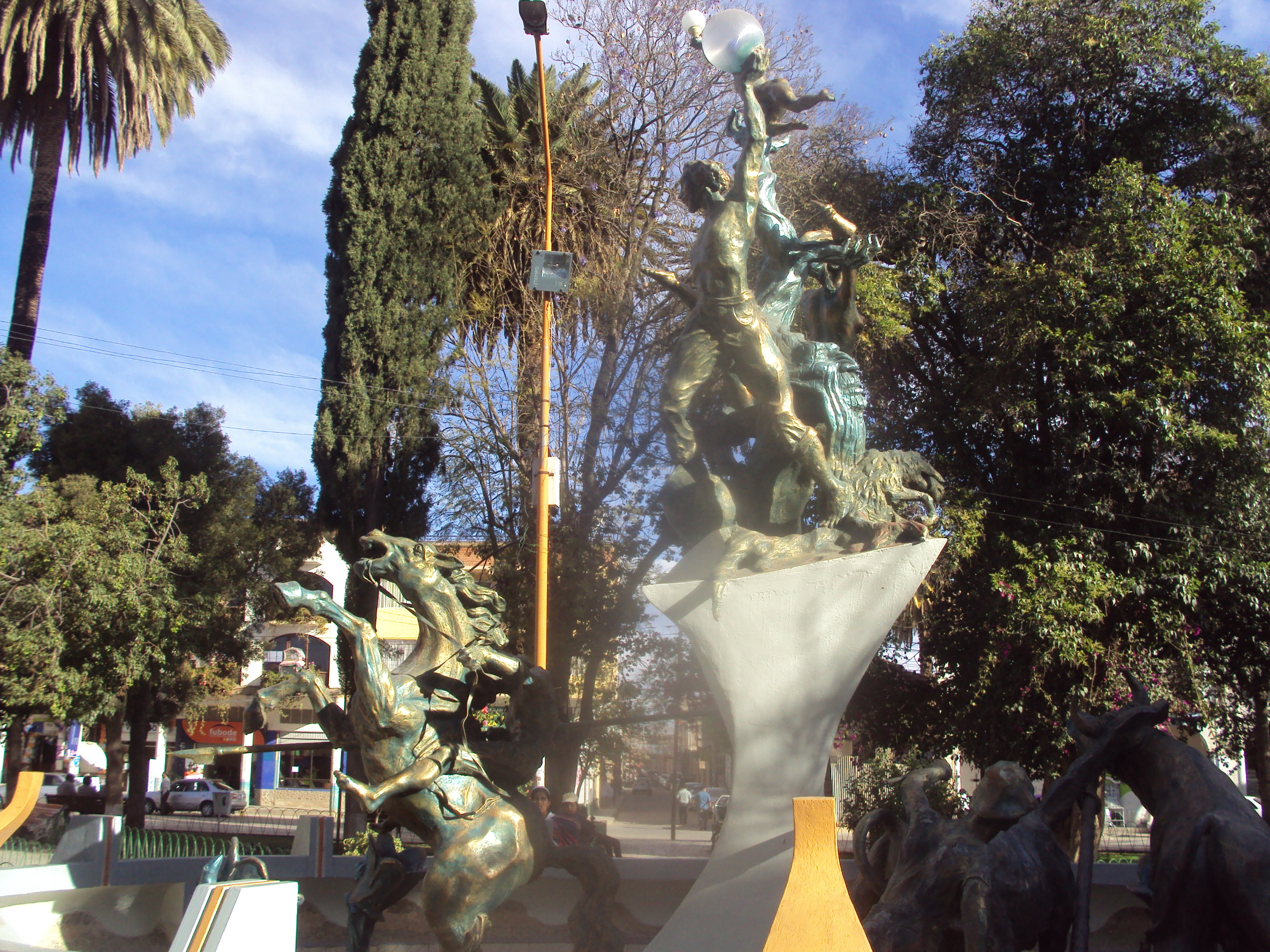
- Monument at the main square of Cliza

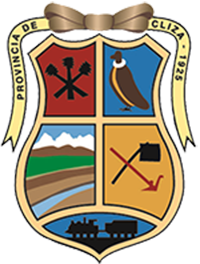
- Coat of arms

- Location within Bolivia
- Coordinates: 17°36′S 65°56′W
- Country: Bolivia
- Department: Cochabamba Department
- Province: Germán Jordán Province
- Municipality: Cliza Municipality
- Canton: Cliza Canton

Area
  - Land: 118 sq mi (305 km^{2})
- Elevation: 9,020 ft (2,750 m)

Population (2012)
  - Total: 21,743
- Time zone: UTC-4 (BOT)

Cliza is a small town in the Cochabamba Department, Bolivia. It is the capital of the Germán Jordán Province and the Cliza Municipality.
