= Tolata, Cochabamba =

Tolata Tulata
- Location of Colomi within Bolivia
- Coordinates: 17°31′0″S 65°58′0″W
- Country: Bolivia
- Department: Cochabamba Department
- Province: Germán Jordán Province
- Municipality: Tolata Municipality
- Canton: Tolata Canton

Population (2001)
  - Total: 2,207
- Time zone: UTC-4 (BOT)

Tolata (Quechua: Tulata) is a locality in the Cochabamba Department in central Bolivia. It is the seat of the Tolata Municipality, the third municipal section of the Germán Jordán Province. At the time of census 2001 it had a population of 2,207.

== Tolata Massacre ==
In January 1974, workers from Manaco shoe factory (founded by the Bata Corporation) in Quillacollo launched protests against the rising cost of staple foods. They held an assembly to make demands from the government, then blockaded the roads connecting Quillacollo. Peasant and worker groups in surrounding areas supported the action, and the government responded swiftly, with an armed occupation of Quillacolo and nearby villages. Up to 200 peasants in Tolata were killed by the Bolivian military.
