= Cliza Municipality =

- Municipality
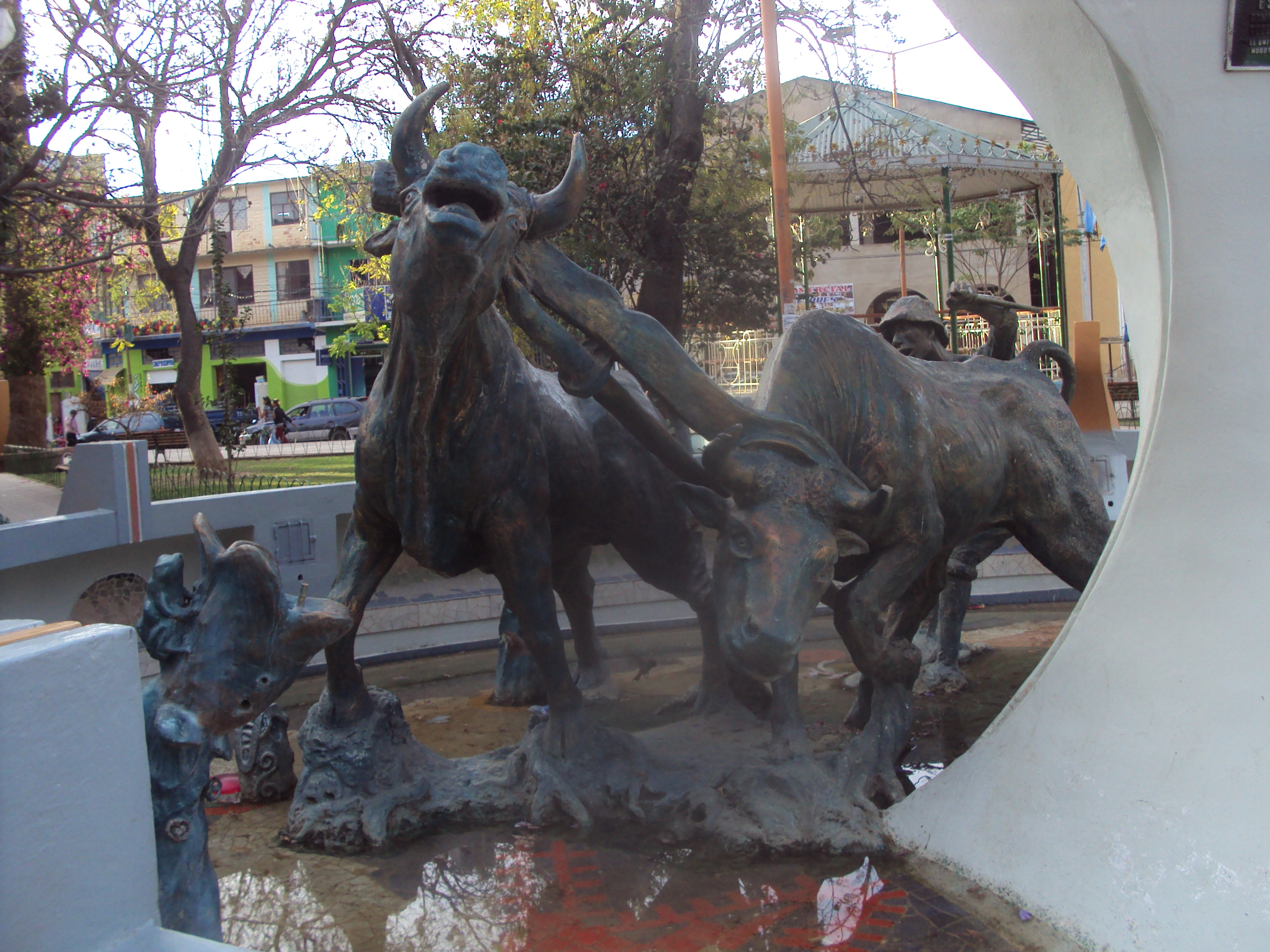
- Main square of Cliza

- Location within Bolivia
- Coordinates: 17°36′S 65°56′W
- Country: Bolivia
- Department: Cochabamba Department
- Province: Germán Jordán Province
- Seat: Cliza

Government
  - Mayor: Freddy Vargas Terceros (2007)
  - President: Emigdio Aguilar Flores (2007)

Population (2001)
  - Total: 19,747
  - Ethnicities: Quechuas
- Time zone: UTC-4 (BOT)

Cliza Municipality is the first municipal section of the Germán Jordán Province in the Cochabamba Department, Bolivia. Its seat is Cliza.
