= Tolata Municipality =

- Municipality
- Flag

- Location within Bolivia
- Coordinates: 17°32′S 66°0′W
- Country: Bolivia
- Department: Cochabamba Department
- Province: Germán Jordán Province
- Seat: Tolata

Population (2001)
  - Total: 5,316
- Time zone: UTC-4 (BOT)

Tolata Municipality is the third municipal section of the Germán Jordán Province in the Cochabamba Department, Bolivia. Its seat is Tolata.

== History ==
Tolata was the site of a massacre of approximately 100 peasants by the Banzer regime in January 1974.
