= List of diplomatic missions in Bolivia =

This is a list of diplomatic missions in Bolivia. At present, the capital city of La Paz hosts 34 embassies. Several other countries have ambassadors accredited from other regional capitals. This listing excludes honorary consulates.

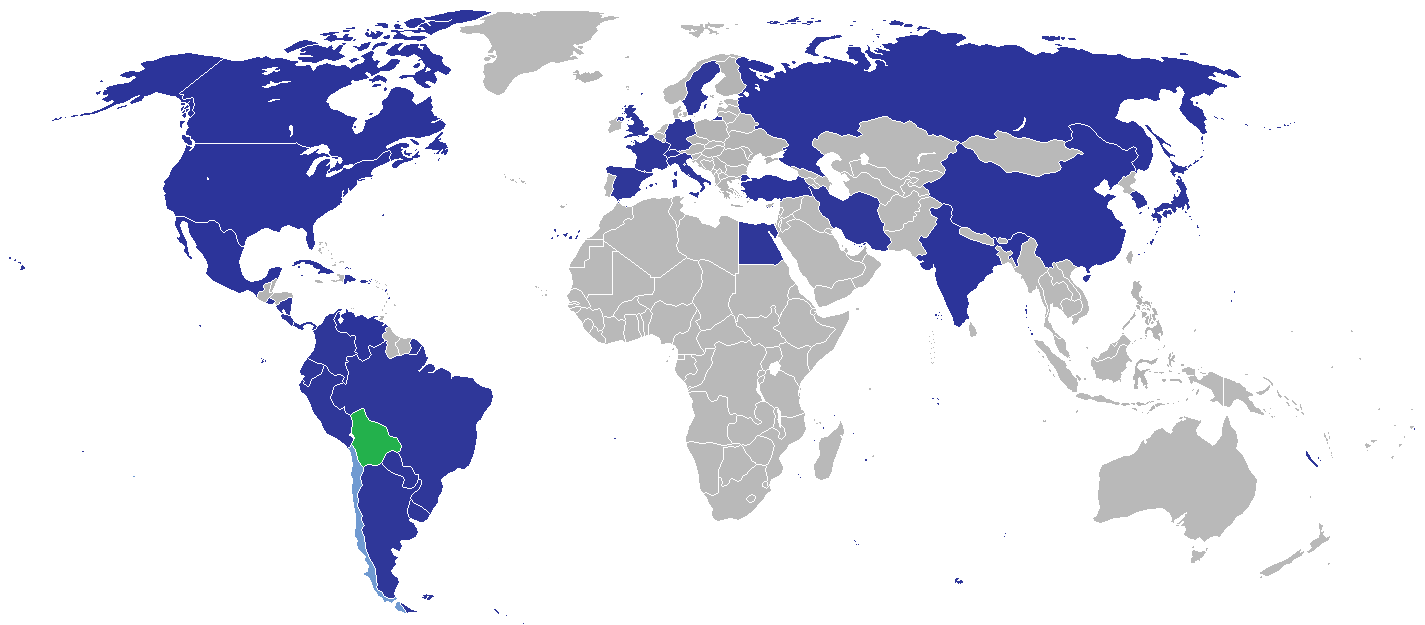
Map of diplomatic missions in Bolivia

== Diplomatic missions in La Paz ==
=== Embassies ===
1. Argentina
2. Brazil
3. China
4. Colombia
5. Costa Rica
6. Cuba
7. Dominican Republic
8. Ecuador
9. Egypt
10. El Salvador
11. France
12. Germany
13. Holy See
14. India
15. Iran
16. Italy
17. Japan
18. Mexico
19. Nicaragua
20. Palestine
21. Panama
22. Paraguay
23. Peru
24. Russia
25. South Korea
26. Sovereign Military Order of Malta
27. Spain
28. Sweden
29. Switzerland
30. Turkey
31. United Kingdom
32. United States
33. Uruguay
34. Venezuela

=== Other missions or delegations in La Paz ===
- Belgium (Development office)
- Canada (Program office)
- European Union (Delegation)

=== Gallery of embassies ===
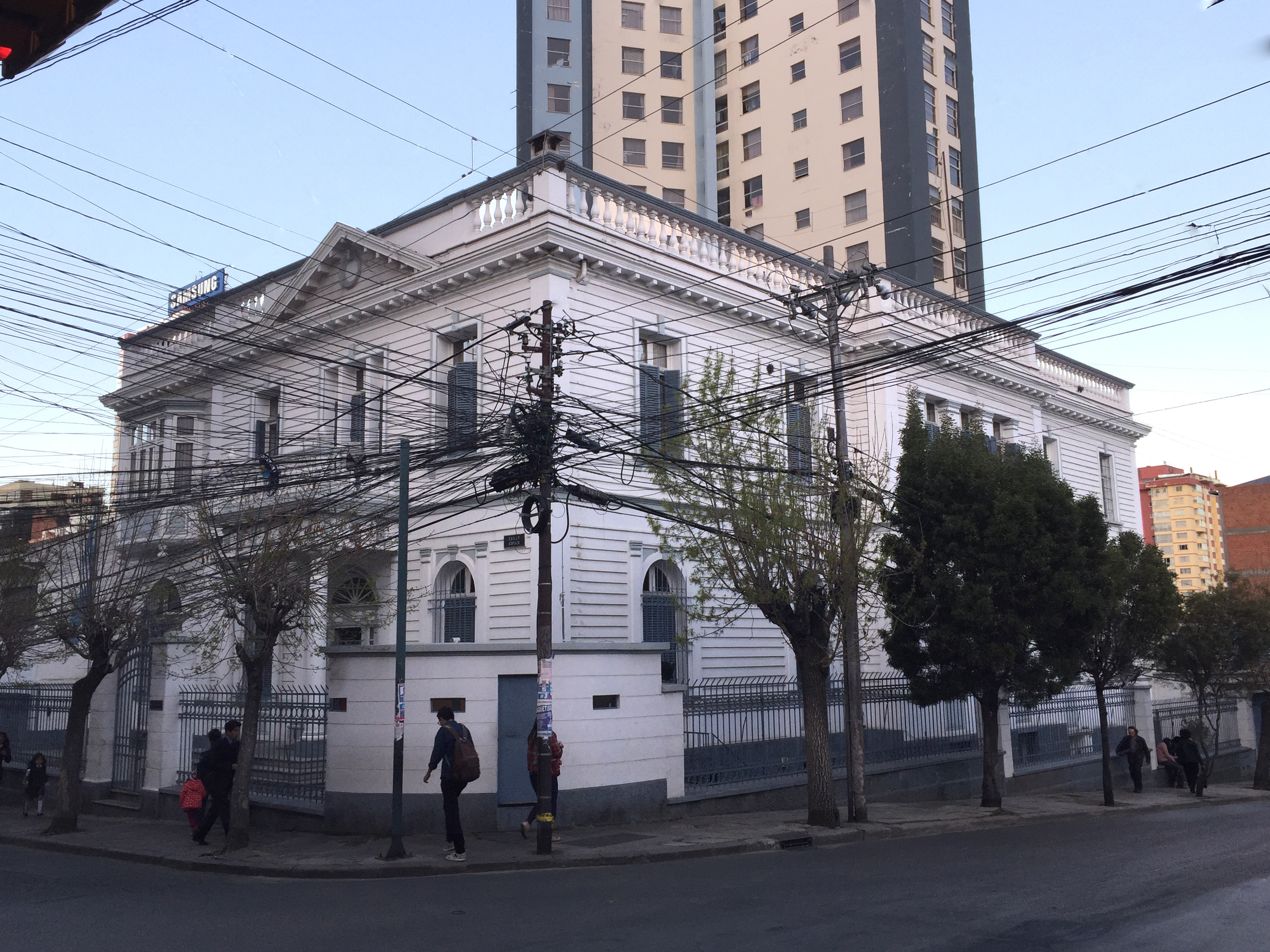
Embassy of Argentina

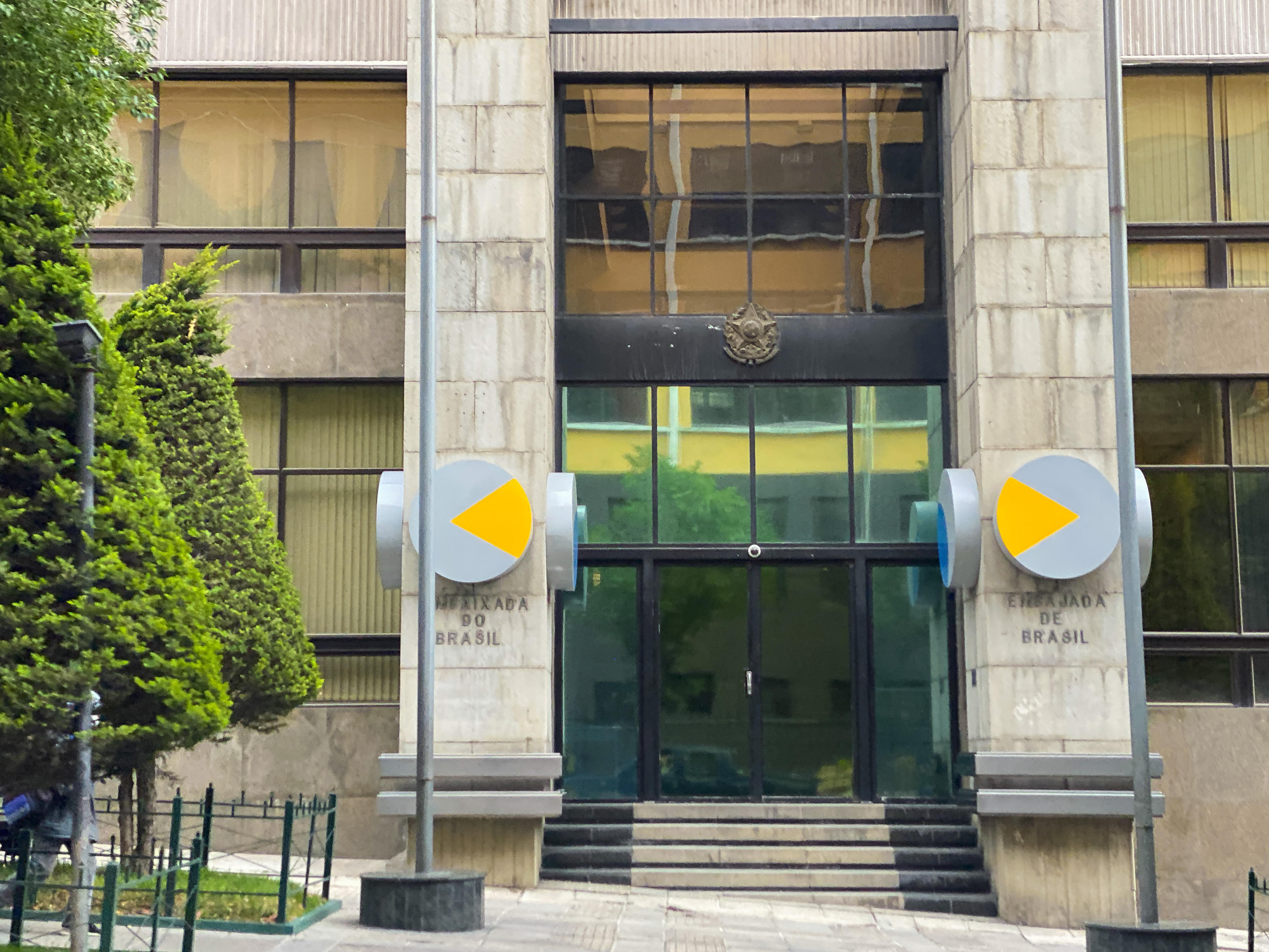
Building hosting the Embassy of Brazil

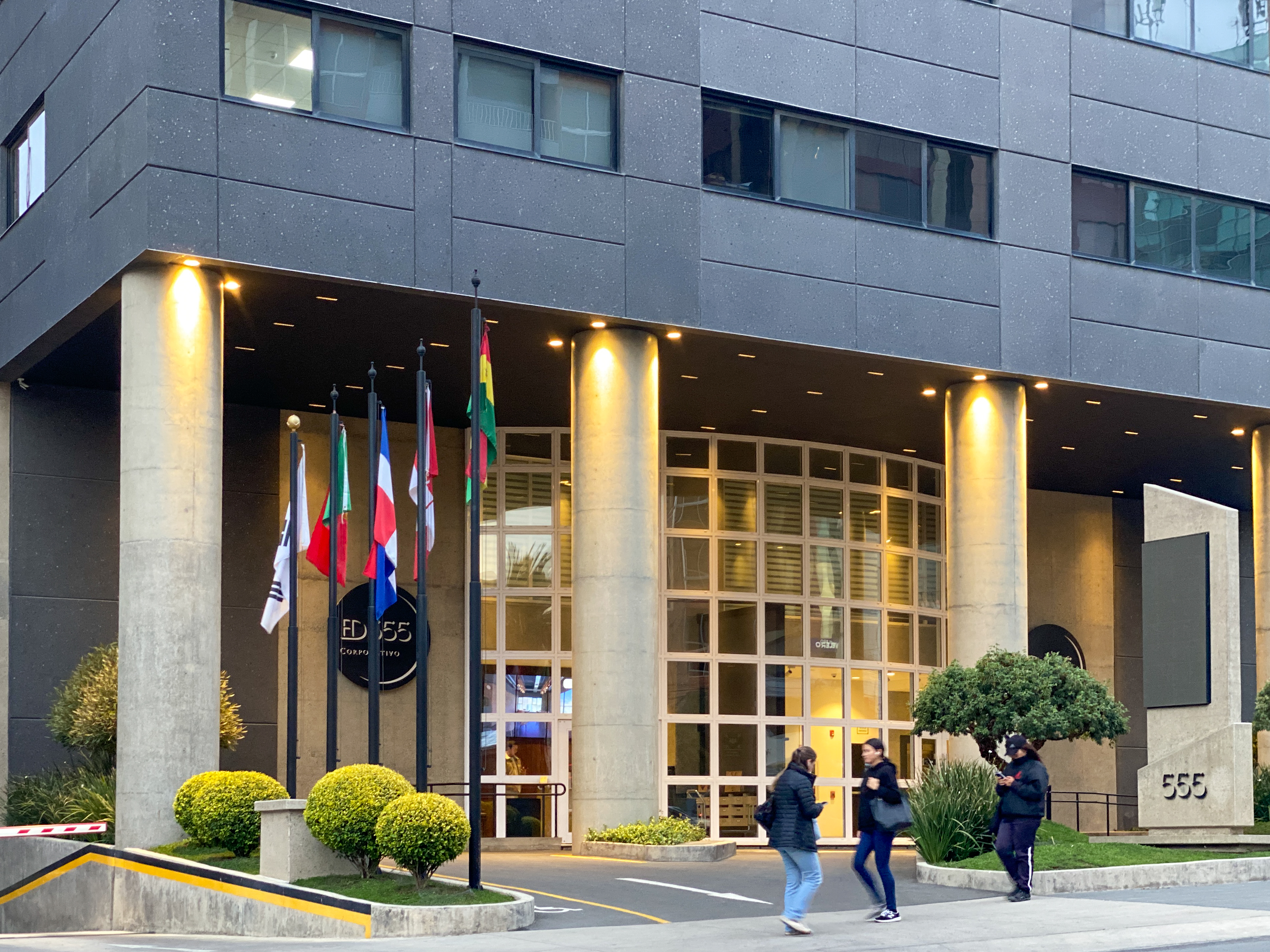
Building hosting the Embassy of Canada

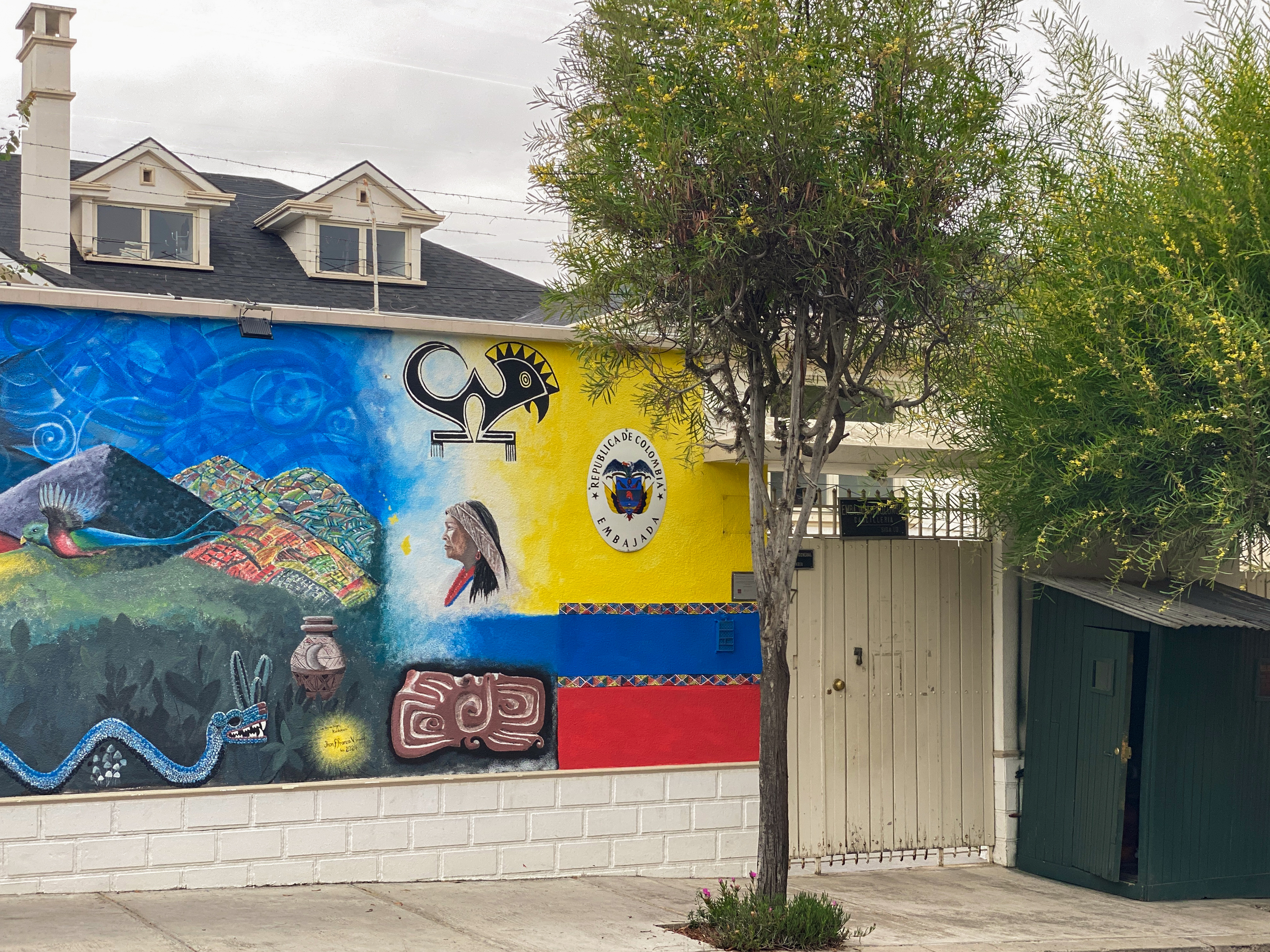
Embassy of Colombia

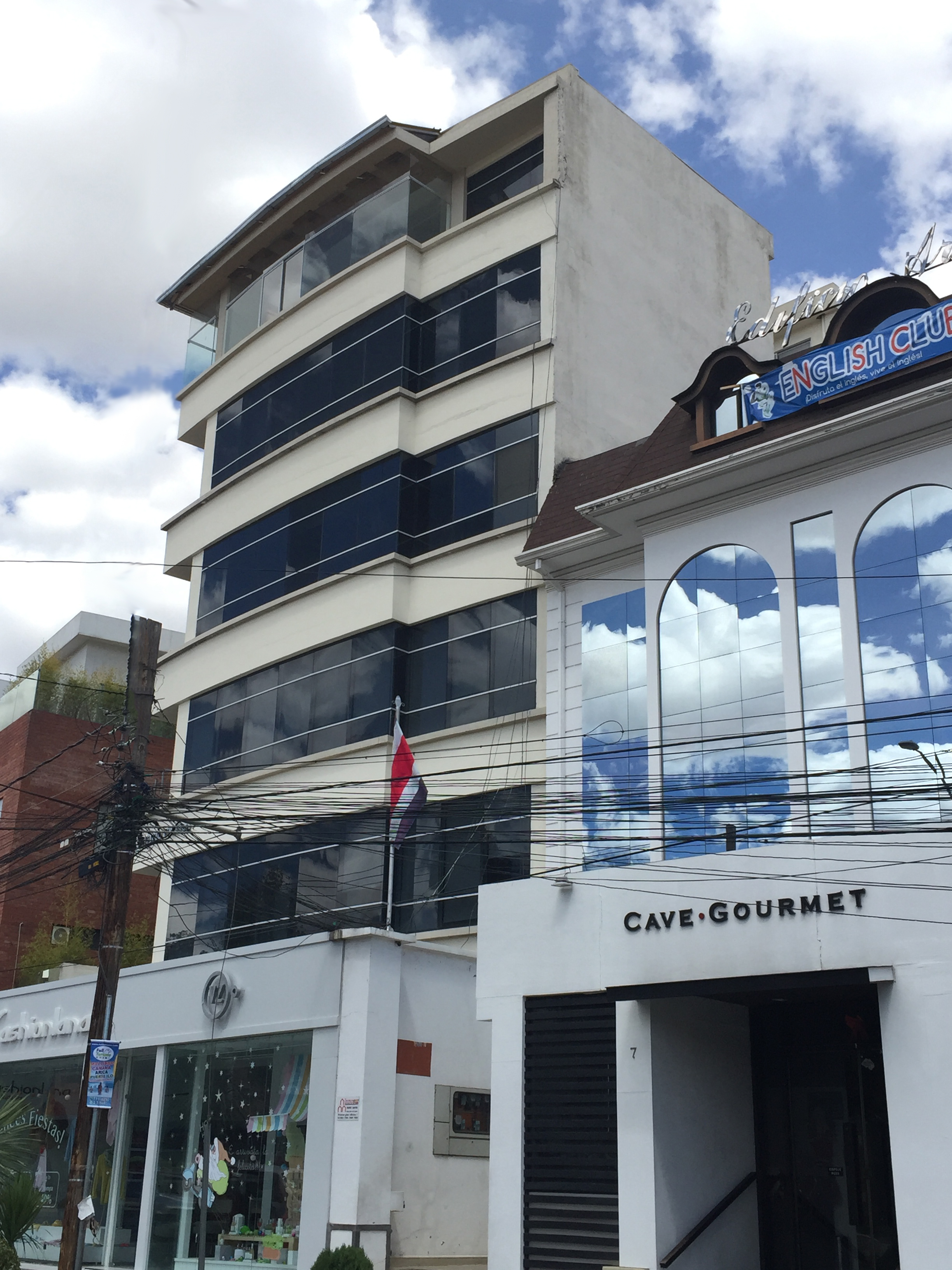
Building hosting the Embassy of Costa Rica

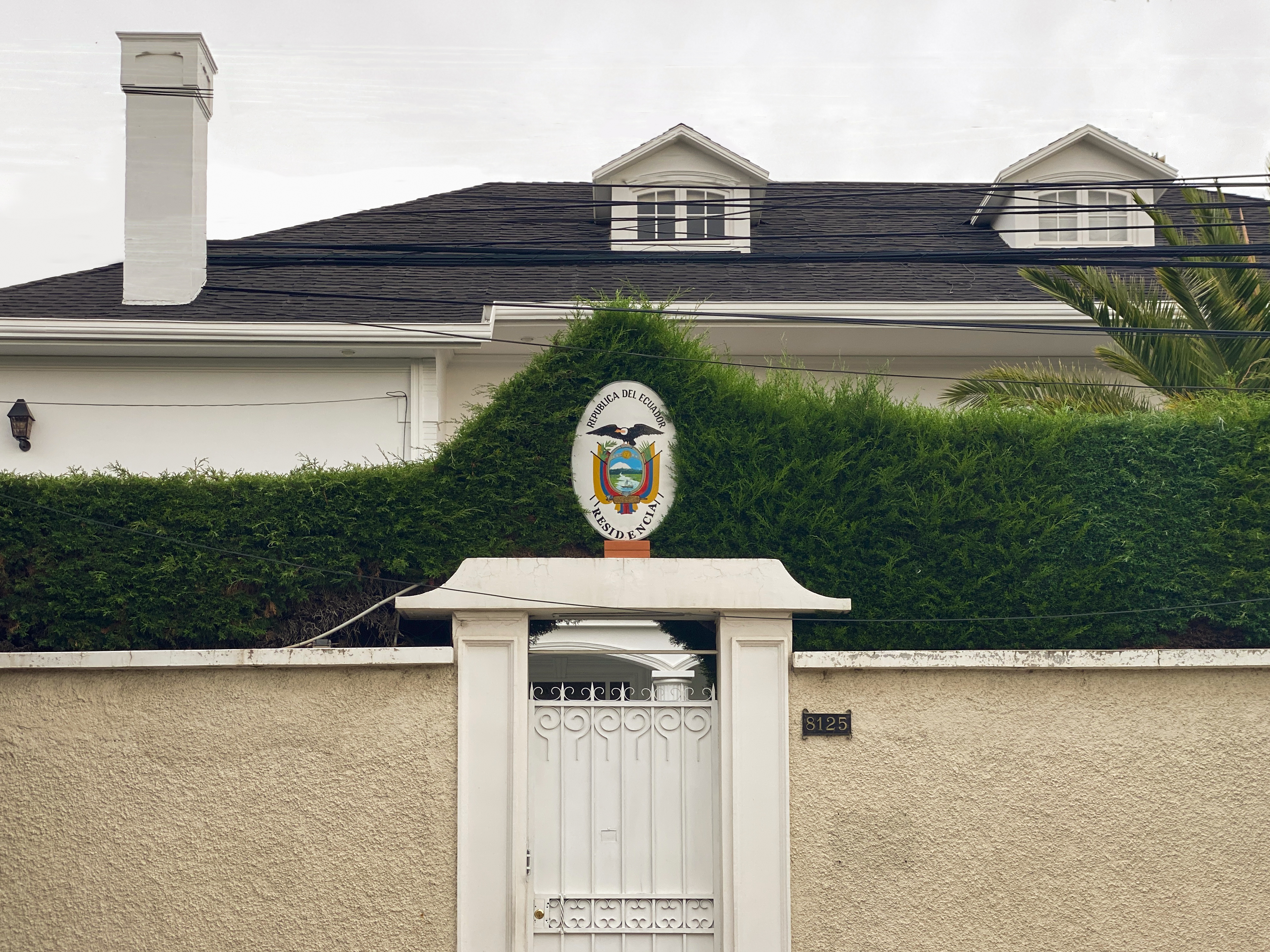
Residency of the Embassy of Ecuador

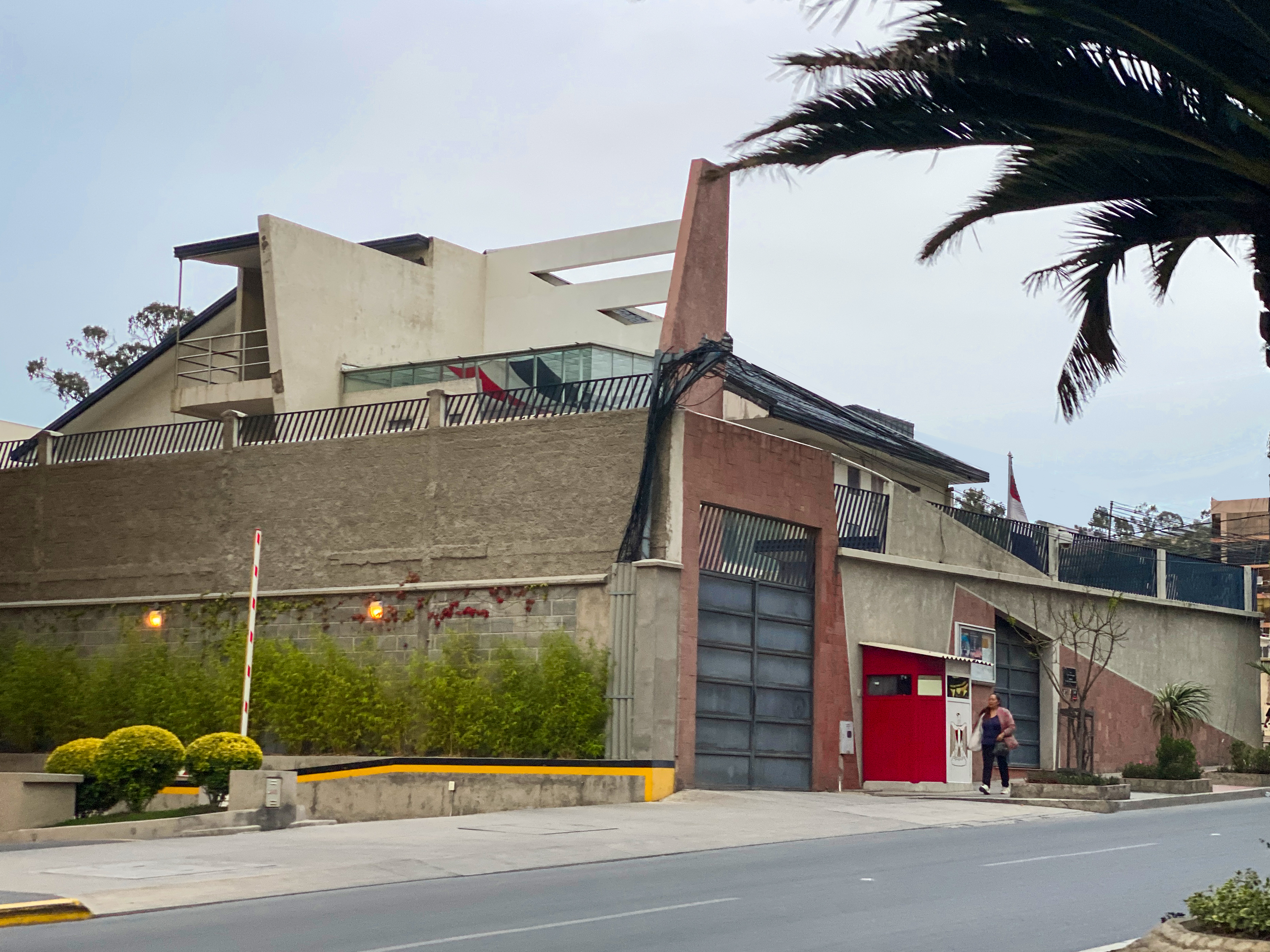
Embassy of Egypt

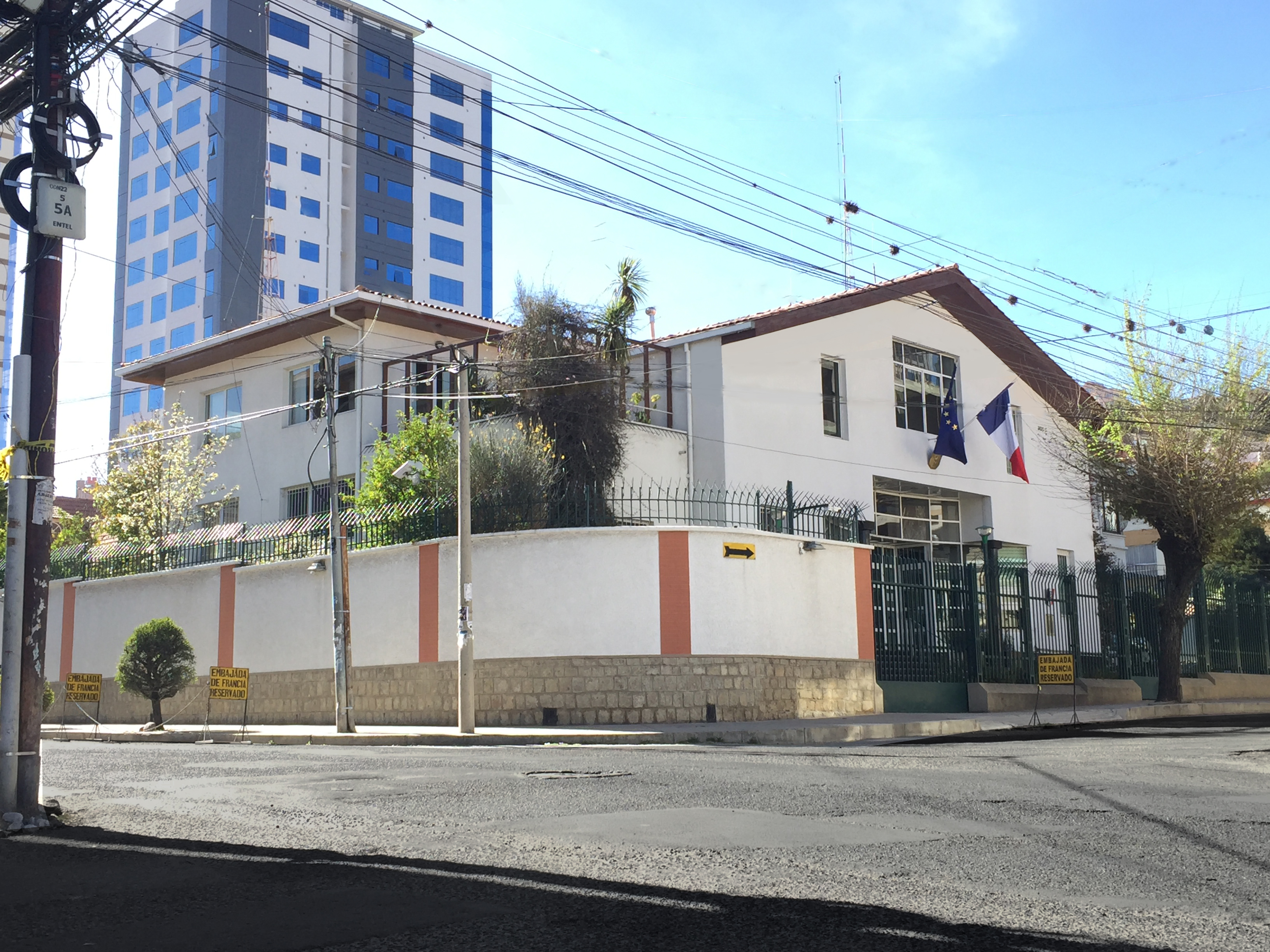
Embassy of France

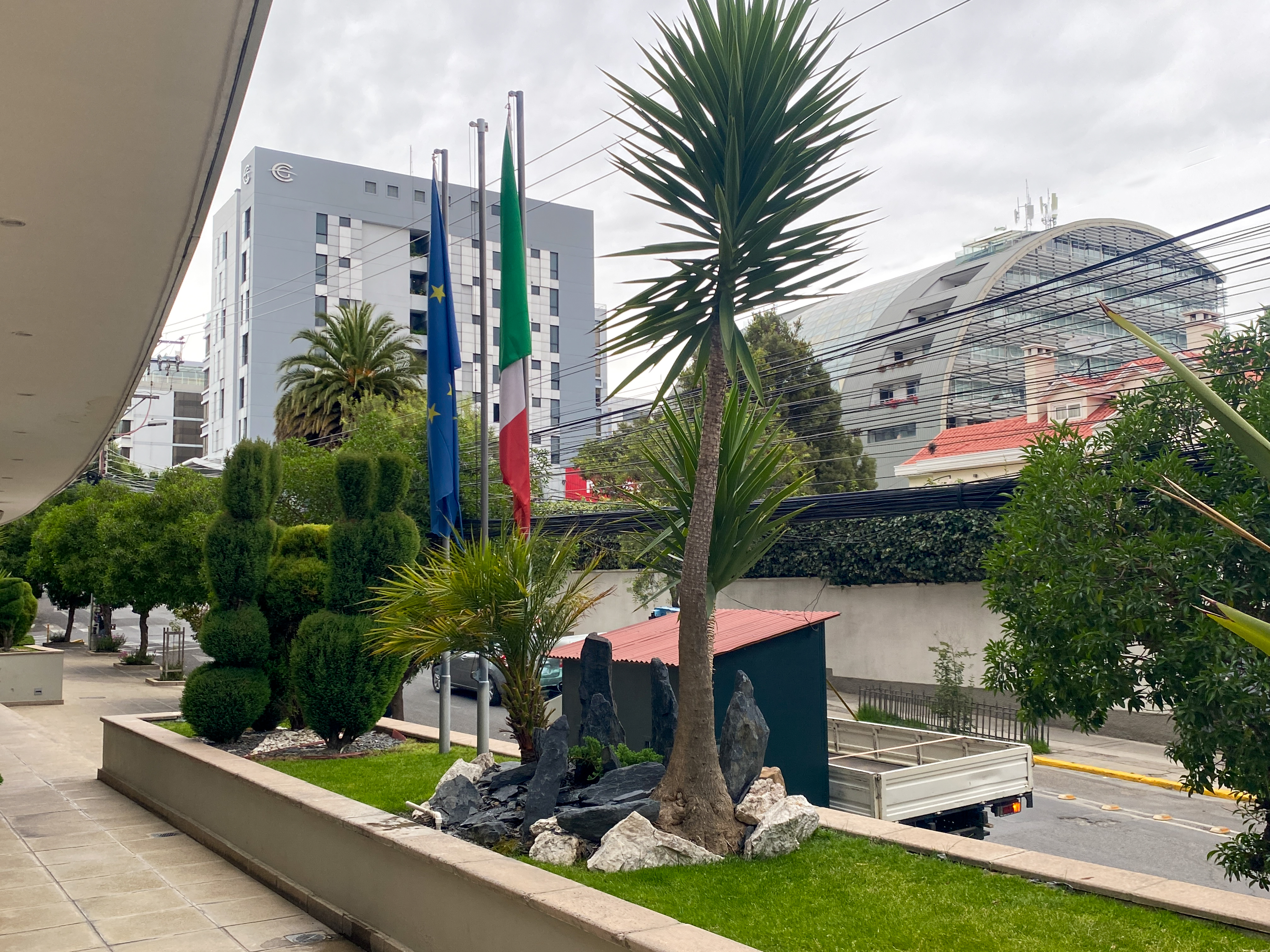
Embassy of Italy

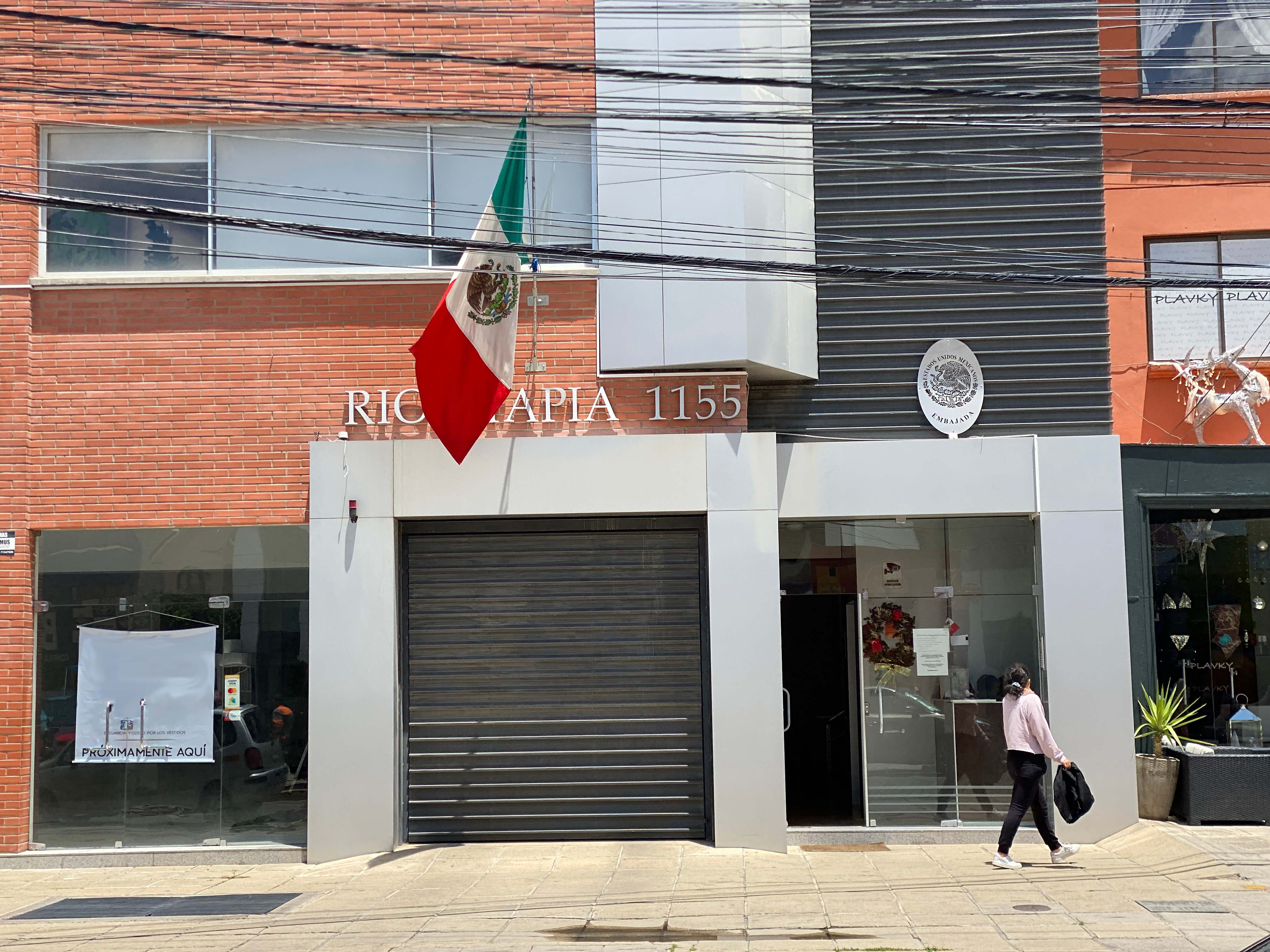
Embassy of Mexico

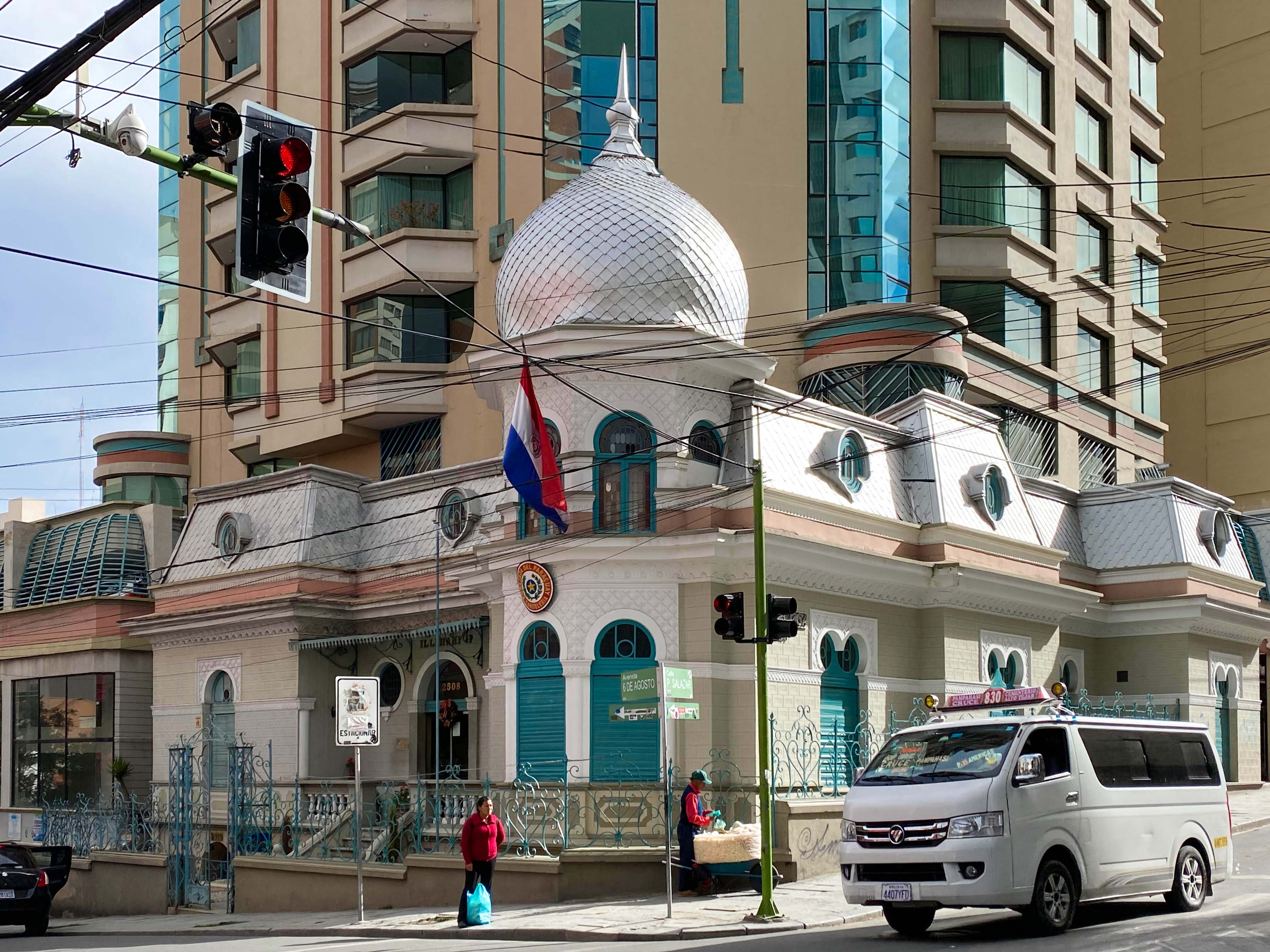
Building hosting the Embassy of Paraguay

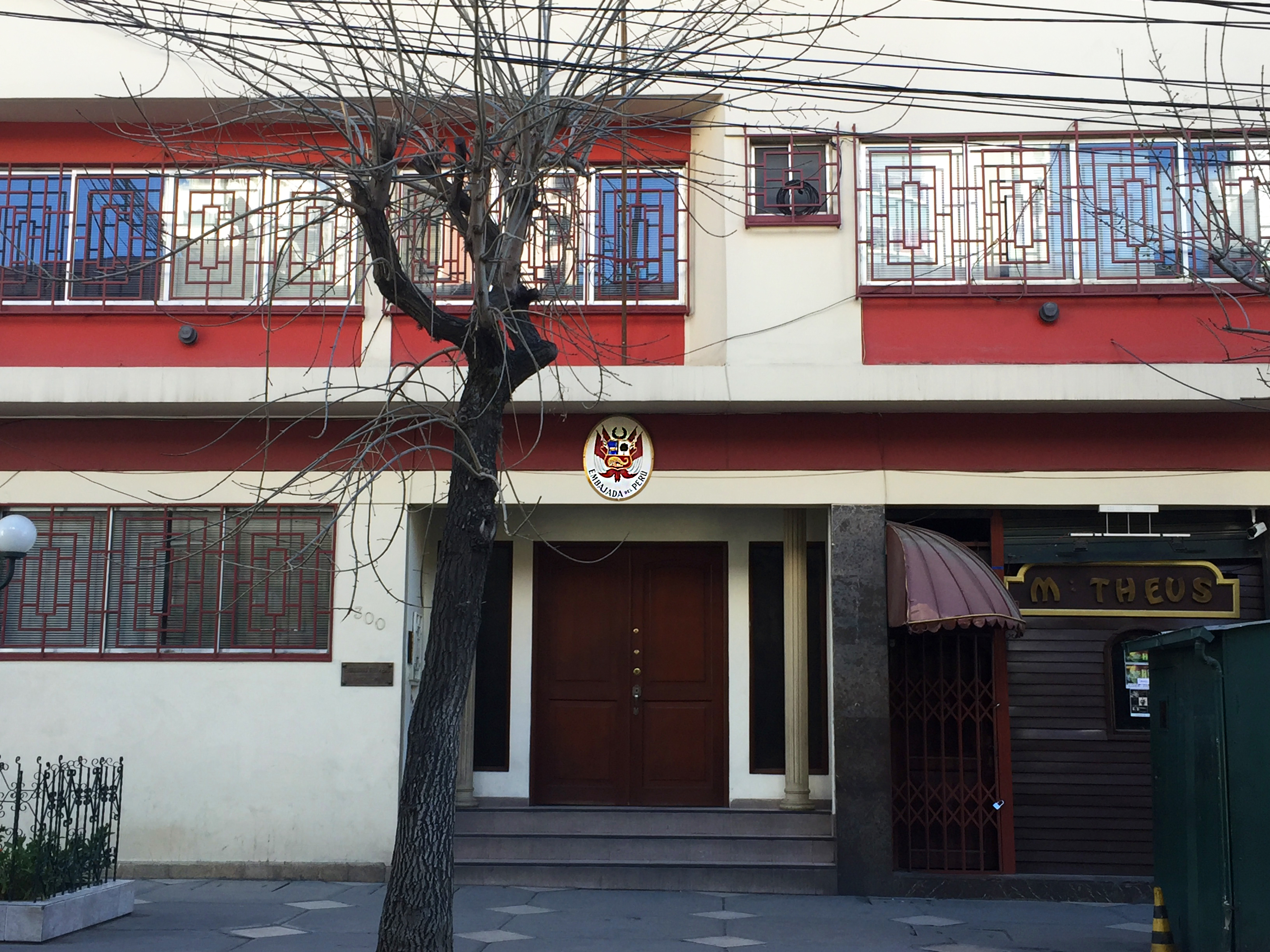
Embassy of Peru

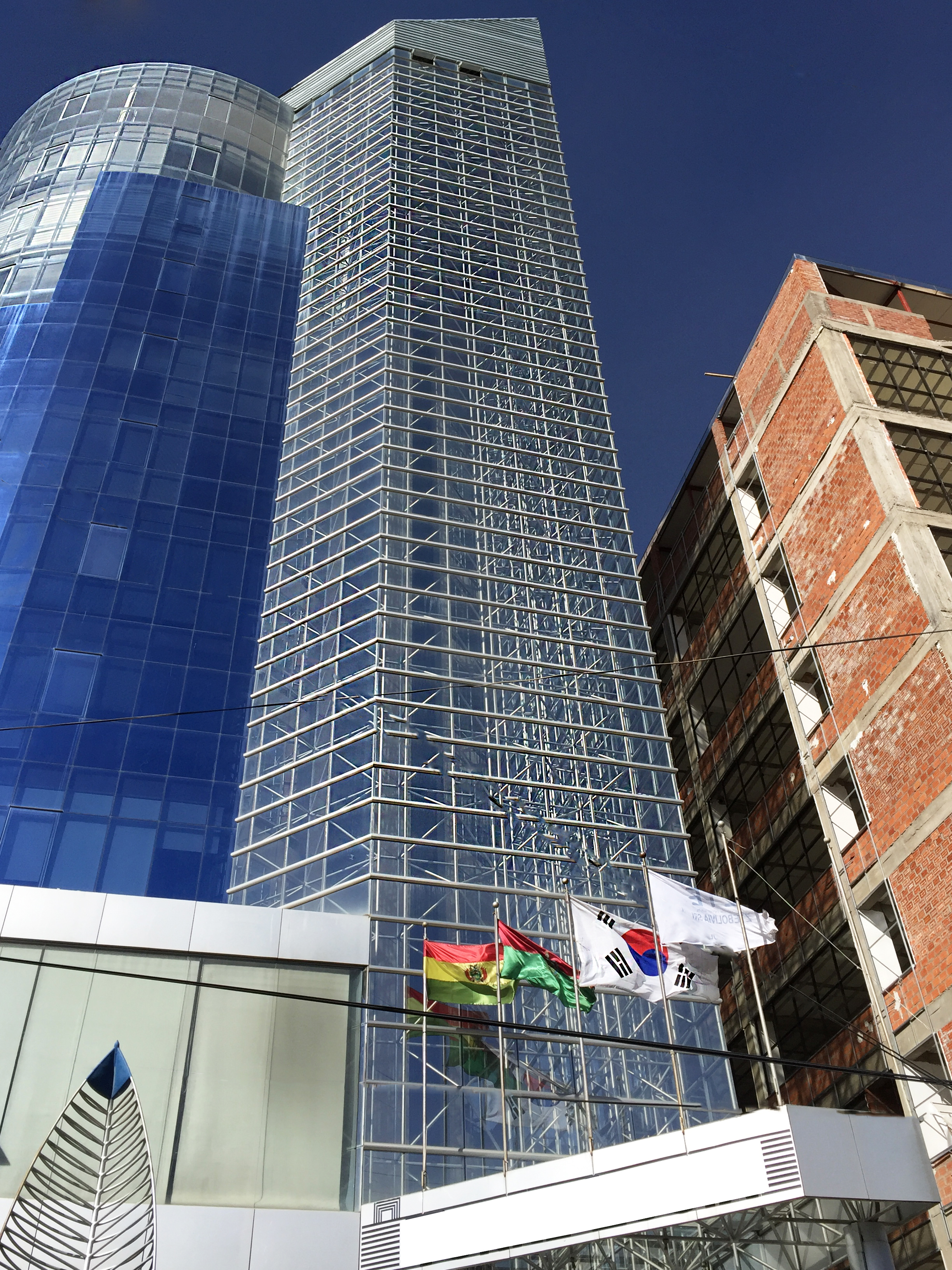
Embassy of South Korea

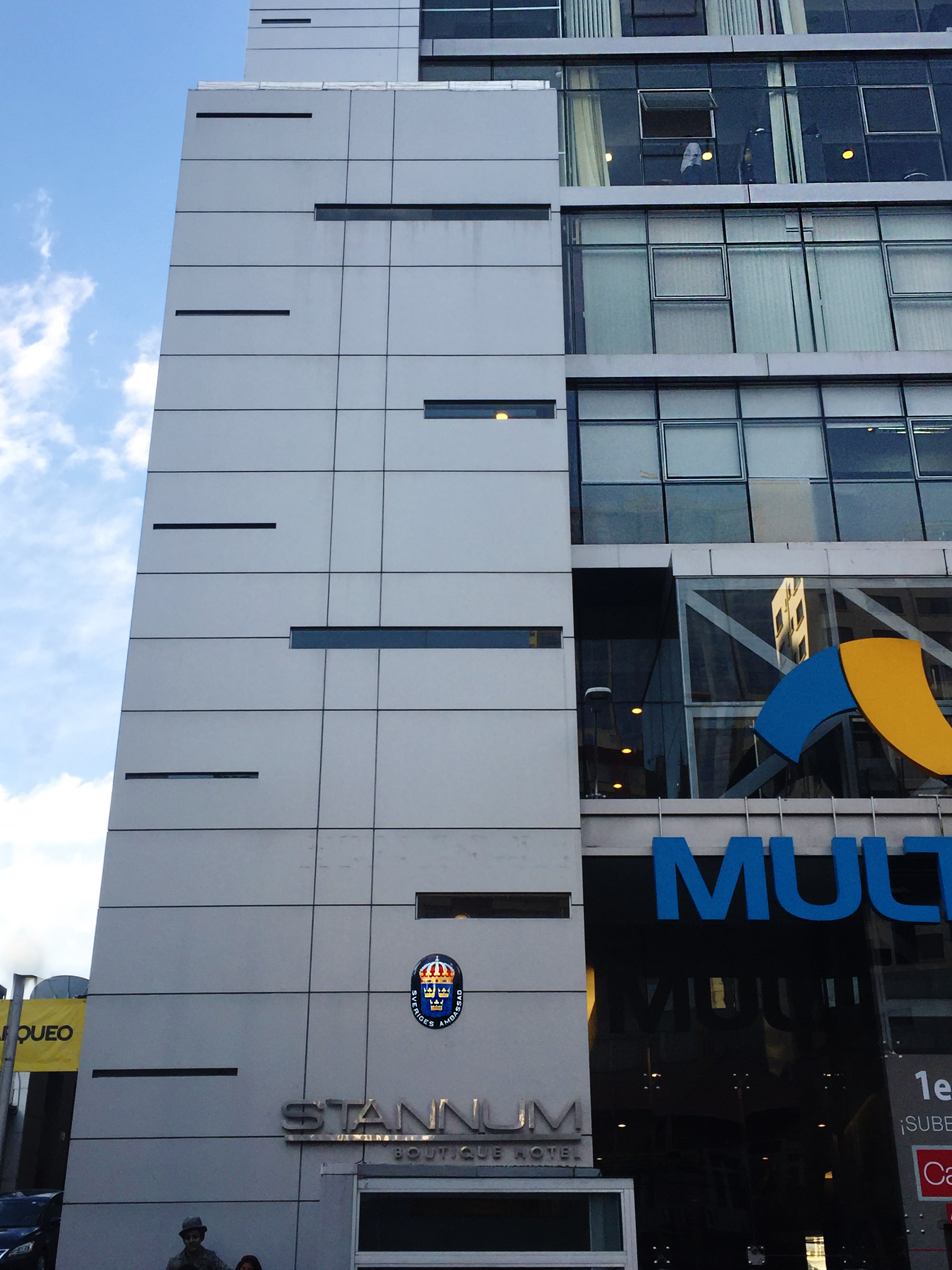
Building hosting the Embassy of Sweden

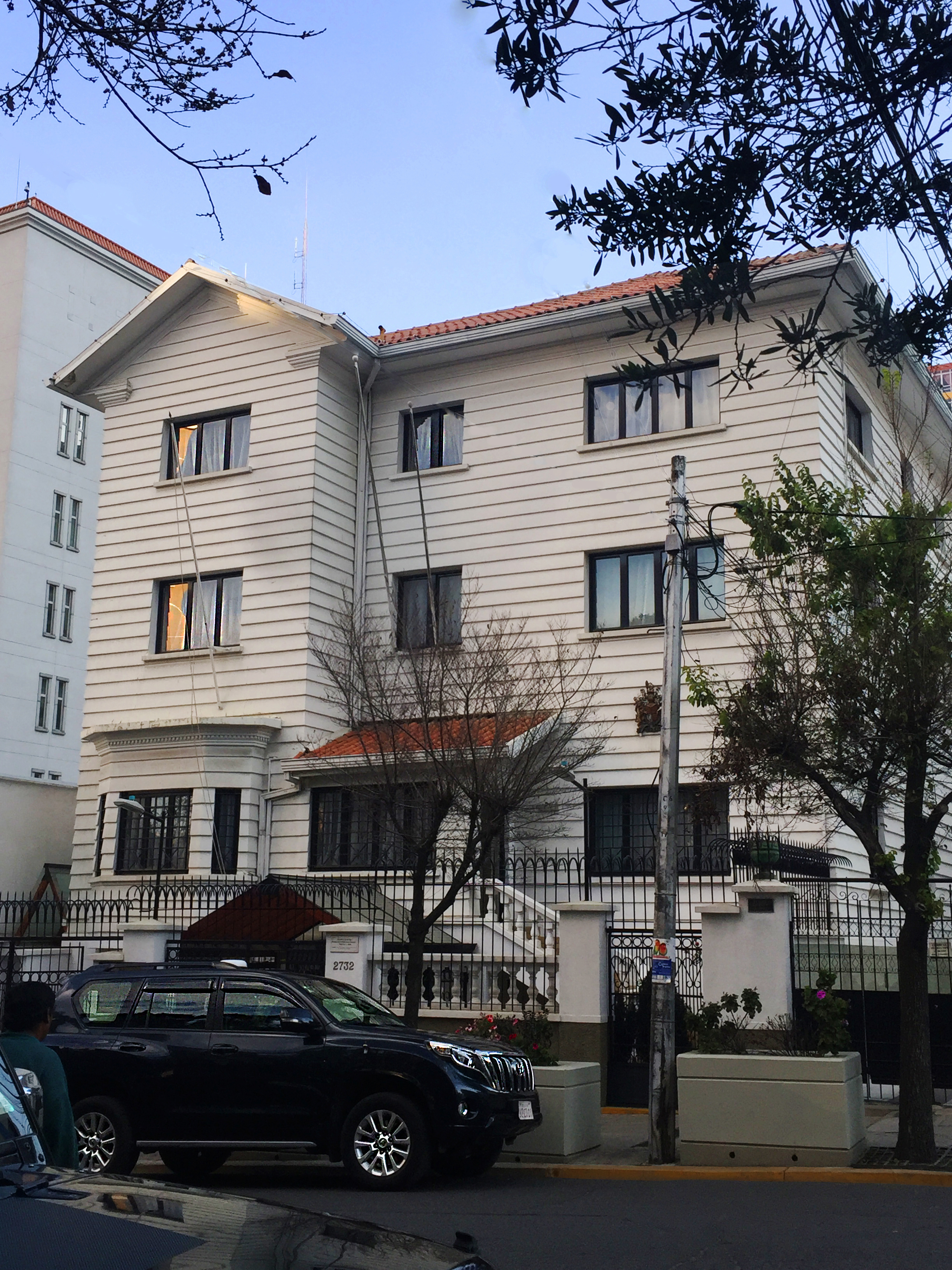
Embassy of the United Kingdom

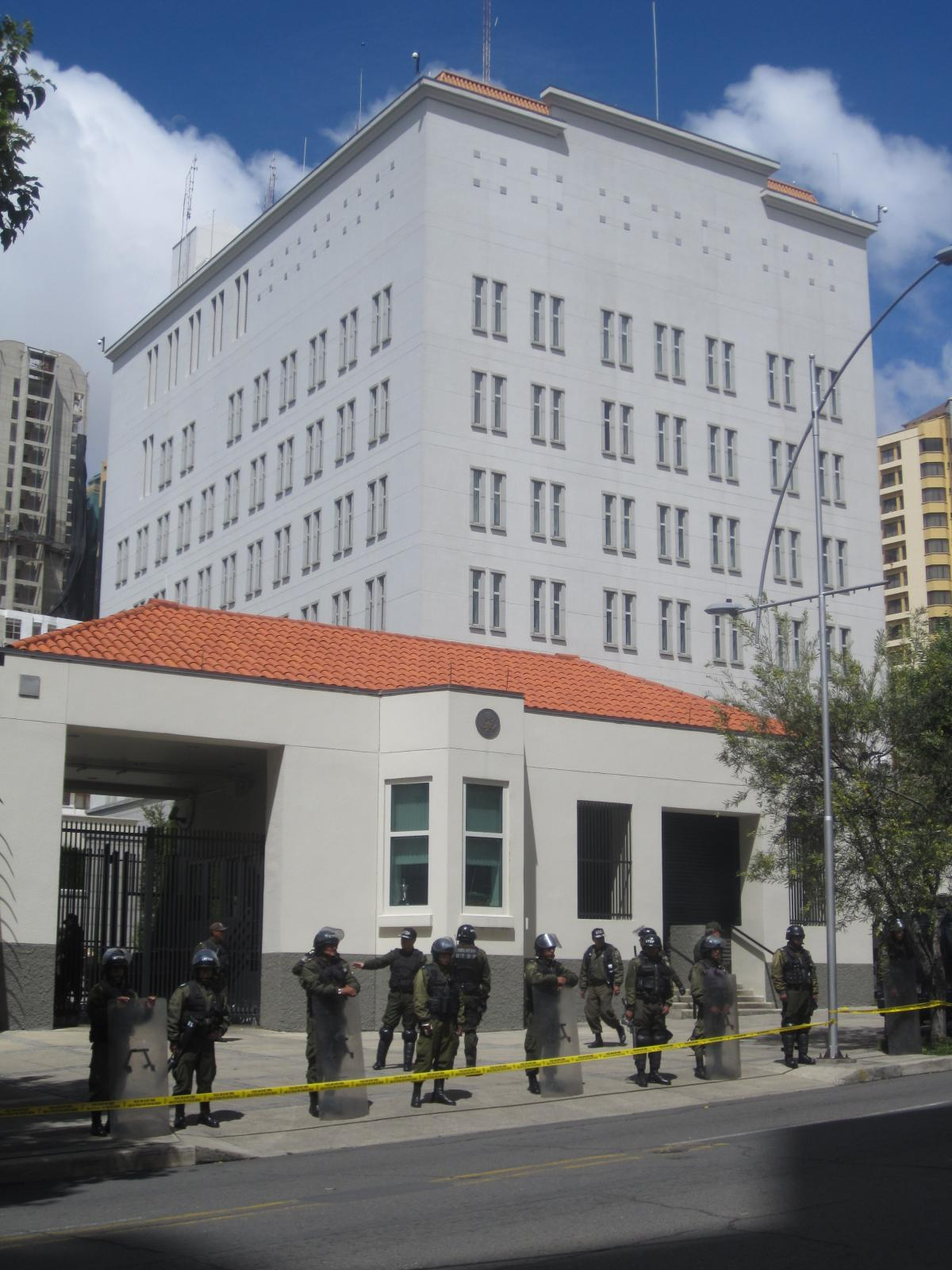
Embassy of the United States

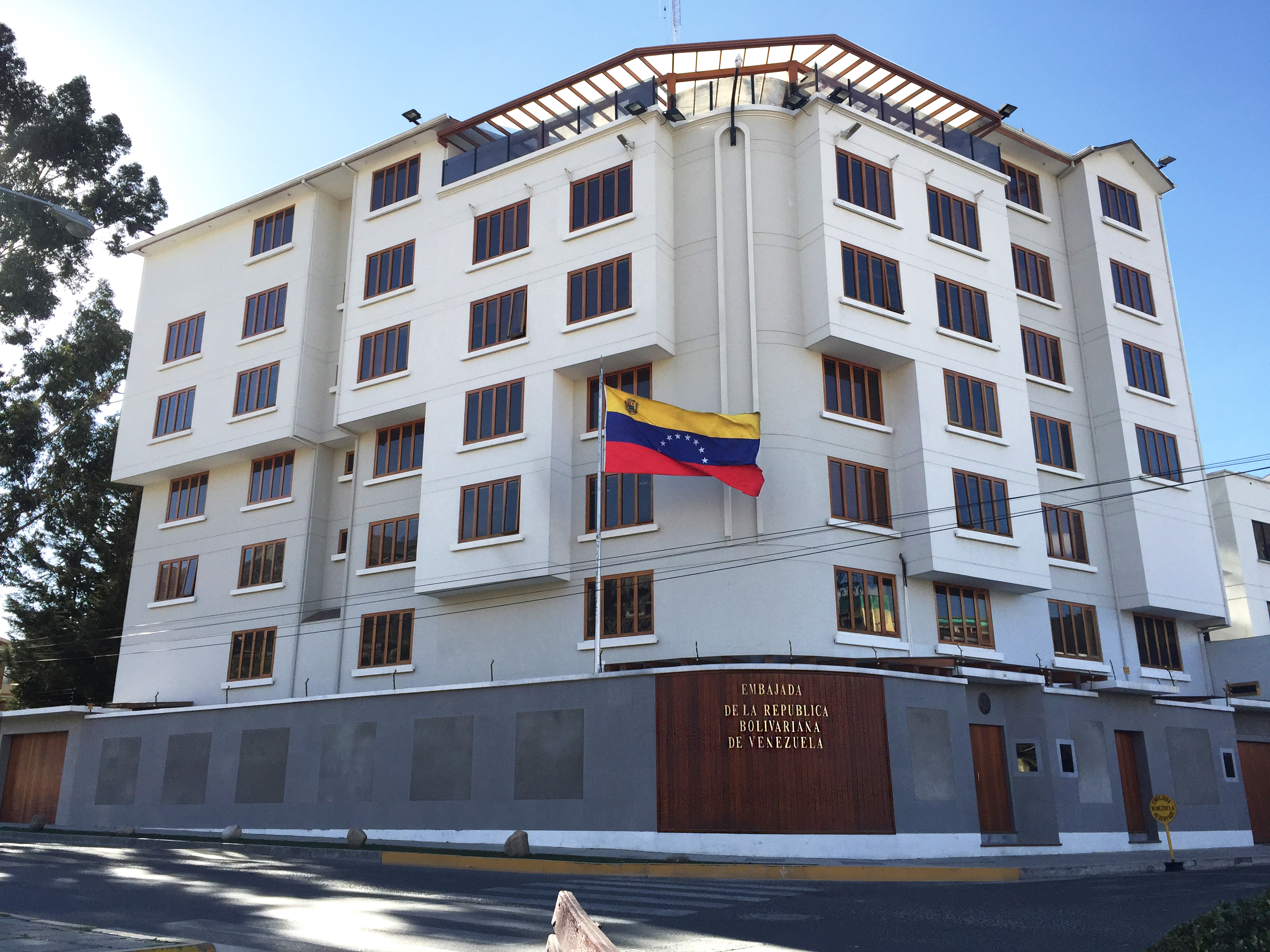
Embassy of Venezuela

== Consular missions ==
=== La Paz ===
- Chile (Consulate-General)

=== Cobija ===
- Brazil (Consulate)

=== Cochabamba ===
- Argentina (Consulate)
- Brazil (Consulate-General)
- Peru (Consulate-General)

=== Guayaramerin ===
- Brazil (Consulate)

=== Puerto Quijarro ===
- Brazil (Consulate)

=== Santa Cruz de la Sierra ===
- Argentina (Consulate-General)
- Brazil (Consulate-General)
- Chile (Consulate-General)
- China (Consulate-General)
- Cuba (Consulate-General)
- Japan (Consular office)
- Paraguay (Consulate-General)
- Peru (Consulate-General)
- Spain (Consulate-General)
- Uruguay (Consulate-General)

=== Tarija ===
- Argentina (Consulate General)

=== Villazón ===
- Argentina (Consulate)

=== Yacuiba ===
- Argentina (Consulate)

== Accredited embassies ==
=== Resident in Brasília, Brazil ===
- Algeria
- Bulgaria
- Ghana
- Guyana
- Iraq
- Libya
- Oman
- Saudi Arabia
- Serbia
- Tunisia
- Vietnam

=== Resident in Buenos Aires, Argentina ===
- Greece
- Ireland
- Norway
- Philippines
- Portugal

=== Resident in Caracas, Venezuela ===
- Barbados
- Belarus
- North Korea
- Sahrawi Republic
- Syria

=== Resident in Lima, Peru ===
- Australia
- Austria
- Belgium
- Canada
- Finland
- Guatemala
- Honduras
- Indonesia
- Malaysia
- Morocco
- Netherlands
- Poland
- Qatar
- Thailand
- Ukraine
- United Arab Emirates

=== Resident elsewhere ===
- Croatia (Santiago)
- Denmark (Bogotá)
- Haiti (Santiago)
- Hungary (Bogotá)
- Jamaica (Bogotá)
- Jordan (Santiago)
- New Zealand (Santiago)

== Former missions ==
- Belgium (closed in 2006) (Note: Resident in Lima, Peru. Continues as a Development office.)
- Denmark (closed in 2017) (Note: Resident in Bogotá, Colombia)
- Honduras (Note: Resident in Lima, Peru)
- Israel
- Libya (closed in 2011) (Note: Resident in Brasília, Federal District, Brazil)
- Netherlands (closed in 2013)
- Peru (Consulate in El Alto closed in 2023)
- Romania (closed in 2000)
- Sahrawi Republic (2026)

== See also ==
- Foreign relations of Bolivia
- List of diplomatic missions of Bolivia
