= International rankings of Bolivia =

International rankings of Bolivia is a list of relative objective measurements for generally subjective qualities such as political corruption or ease of doing business.

== General ==
Rankings	Publisher	Year	Rank	Score	Description
Global Gender Gap Report	World Economic Forum	2013	27	0.7340	Measures inequality among men and women
Globalization Index		2013	64	78.00	Determines global connectivity, integration and interdependence in the economic, social, technological, cultural, political, and ecological spheres

== Demographics ==
Rankings	Publisher	Year	Rank	Score	Description
Population	Central Intelligence Agency	2013	83	10,461,053	The number of inhabitants in the country

== Economy ==
Rankings	Publisher	Year	Rank	Score	Description
Economic complexity index	Harvard Business School	2008	101	-0.879	
Gini coefficient	Central Intelligence Agency	2010	14	53.0	"This index measures the degree of inequality in the distribution of family income in a country"
Global Competitiveness Report	World Economic Forum	2013; 2014	98	3.84	"assesses the competitiveness landscape of 148 economies, providing insight into the drivers of their productivity and prosperity"
Global Innovation Index	World Intellectual Property Organization	2026	114		"recognizes the key role of innovation as a driver of economic growth and prosperity and acknowledges the need for a broad horizontal vision of innovation that is applicable to both developed and emerging economies, with the inclusion of indicators that go beyond the traditional measures of innovation"
Index of Economic Freedom	The Heritage Foundation/The Wall Street Journal	2014	158	48.4	""

== Military ==
- Institute for Economics and Peace Global Peace Index ranked 81 out of 144

== Politics ==
- Transparency International Corruption Perceptions Index ranked 120 out of 180

== Other ==
Organization	Survey	Ranking
Institute for Economics and Peace	Global Peace Index	81 out of 144
United Nations Development Programme	Human Development Index	113 out of 182
Transparency International	Corruption Perceptions Index	120 out of 180
World Economic Forum	Global Competitiveness Report	120 out of 133
