= Environmental issues in Bolivia =

Environmental issues in Bolivia include deforestation caused by commercial agriculture, urbanization, and illegal logging, and biodiversity loss attributed to illegal wildlife trade, climate change, deforestation, and habitat destruction. Since 1990, Bolivia has experienced rapid urbanization raising concerns about air quality and water pollution.

== Deforestation ==
Bolivia has the 13th largest national share of the world's forest cover. As of 2015, its primary forest cover was 36.2 million hectares, the 13th largest national area in the world and representing 2.8% of the worldwide total. Bolivia also has the seventh largest amount of tropical rainforest. Overall, forests made up 51.4 million hectares or 46.8% of the country's total area as of 2013. Both primary forest and overall forest cover have been declining in recent decades.

Due to mostly cattle ranching, mechanized cultivation and small-scale agriculture, Bolivia lost approximately 200,000 hectares of rainforest per year between 2006 and 2010. Demand for Bolivian agricultural products has risen in part due to the integration of Bolivian agriculture into international commodity markets. Brazilian companies and farmers in particular have made large investments giving them increasing control and influence over Bolivian land, which has resulted in deforestation. The Tierras Bajas region in eastern Bolivia, which was a site of a World Bank Development project, has seen some of the greatest deforestation due to the establishment of industrial scale soybean plantations largely by foreign landowners.

Colonization schemes have also contributed to deforestation in Bolivia. Since the 1960's, the Bolivian lowlands have seen large scale colonization by rural nationals from the Andean region as well as America and Japan. This has largely been encouraged by the Bolivian government. Inexpensive land and fertile soil were additional driving factors for these immigrants who contributed to organizing commercial farming causing deforestation to increase by 60% from the 1980's to the 1990's.

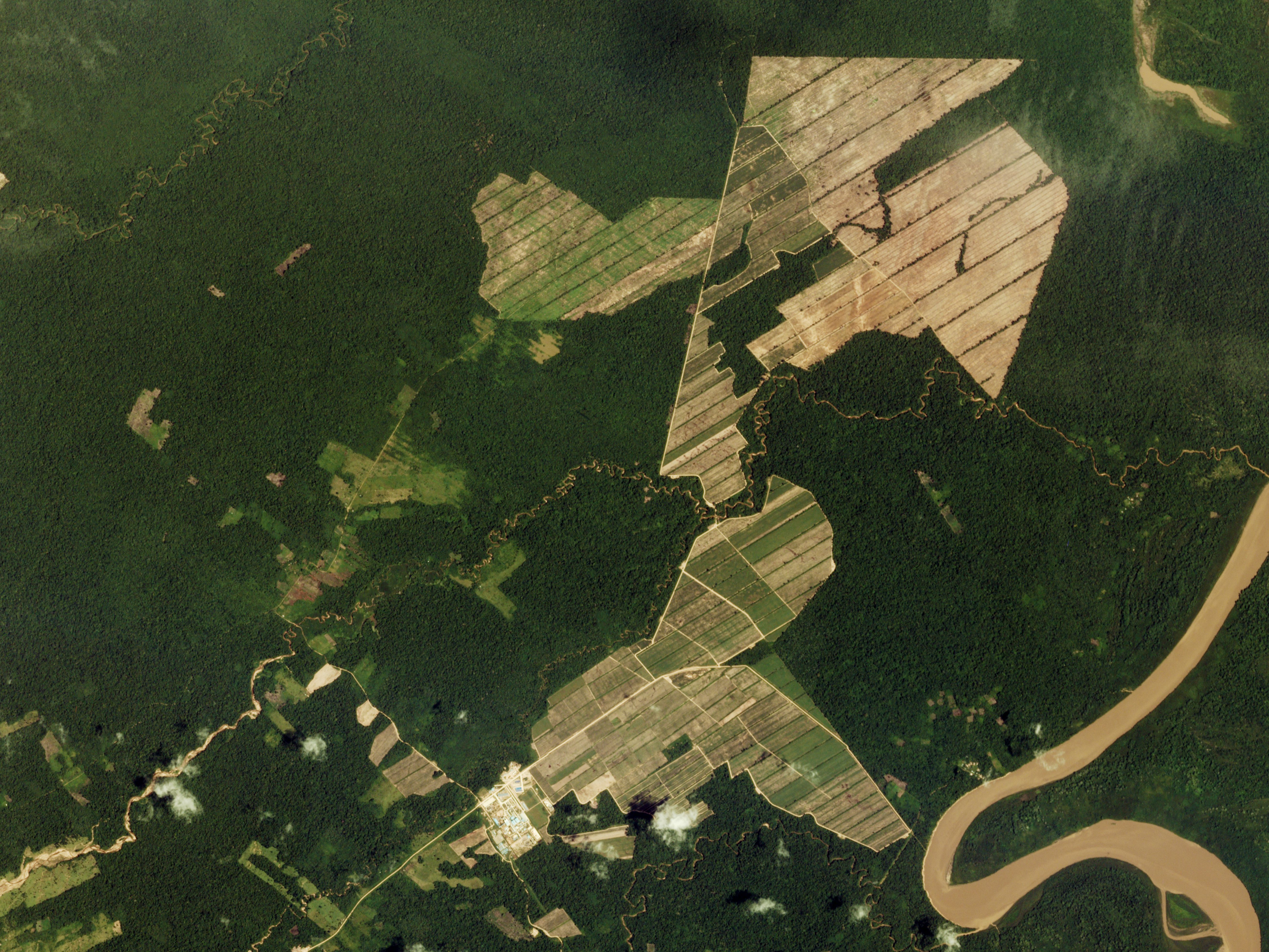
Deforestation in the Bolivian Andes

In recent years, the growth of coca-leaves has become widespread in Bolivia. To create space for these large plantations, large areas have been deforested via slash and burn operations. An estimated 4 hectares of forest need to be cleared for each one hectare of land needed for the cultivation of coca.

Logging, which is often done illegally in Bolivia, and forest fires are additional causes of deforestation. Illegal logging has occurred even in the Isiboro Secure National Park and Indigenous Territory (TIPNIS) which is a designated state park. Concerns about the impact of illegal logging on deforestation were so serious that in 2011 Bolivian protestors were able to halt the construction of a highway that would have increased access to the TIPNIS territory. Bolivia's highway network remains underdeveloped, restricting access to specific forested areas. However, as the country progresses, expanded road construction might not only lead to deforestation but also enhance access for illegal loggers to these forested regions.

Forest Cover in Bolivia (1,000s of hectares of primary forest)
1990	2000	2005	2010	2015	
40,804	39,046	38,164	37,164	36,164	2.8%
As reported to the Global Forest Resources Assessment.

The final figure (2.8%) represents the percentage of worldwide total in 2015.

Forest cover in Bolivia by type of forest (2013)
	Forest Type	Area (ha)	Percent of forest	Percent of Bolivia
1	Amazon forest	19,402,388	37.7	17.7
2	Chaco forest	9,098,162	17.7	8.3
3	Chiquitano forest	8,645,849	16.8	7.9
4	Yungas forest	6,565,994	12.8	6.0
5	Tucumano forest	3,322,885	6.5	3.0
6	Flooded forest	3,047,598	5.9	2.8
7	Pantanal forest	1,147,401	2.2	1.0
8	Dry inter-Andean forest	172,227	0.3	0.2
9	Andean forest	4,496	0.01	0.0
Total forest, 2013		51,407,000	100	46.8

Source: MMAyA-OTCA, summarized by Andersen et al 2016:S1.

=== Tree cover extent and loss ===
Global Forest Watch publishes annual estimates of tree cover loss and 2000 tree cover extent derived from time-series analysis of Landsat satellite imagery in the Global Forest Change dataset. In this framework, tree cover refers to vegetation taller than 5 m (including natural forests and tree plantations), and tree cover loss is defined as the complete removal of tree cover canopy for a given year, regardless of cause.

For Bolivia, country statistics report cumulative tree cover loss of 9,778,669 ha (97,786.69 km^{2}) from 2001 to 2024 (about 15.1% of its 2000 tree cover area). For tree cover density greater than 30%, country statistics report a 2000 tree cover extent of 64,556,285 ha (645,562.85 km^{2}). The charts and table below display this data. In simple terms, the annual loss number is the area where tree cover disappeared in that year, and the extent number shows what remains of the 2000 tree cover baseline after subtracting cumulative loss. Forest regrowth is not included in the dataset.

Annual tree cover loss in Bolivia, 2001–2024. View chart definition.
Tree cover extent in 2000 minus cumulative tree cover loss in Bolivia, 2001–2024 (loss-only residual; does not account for gain). View chart definition.

Annual tree cover extent and loss
Year	Tree cover extent (km2) (Note: This residual measure does not include forest regrowth.)	Annual tree cover loss (km2)
2001	644,160.75	1,402.10
2002	642,373.81	1,786.94
2003	640,736.63	1,637.18
2004	638,703.56	2,033.07
2005	636,194.90	2,508.66
2006	634,031.45	2,163.45
2007	632,132.02	1,899.43
2008	628,433.08	3,698.94
2009	626,179.62	2,253.46
2010	621,662.39	4,517.23
2011	618,358.82	3,303.57
2012	615,623.21	2,735.61
2013	613,825.28	1,797.93
2014	611,260.00	2,565.28
2015	609,597.49	1,662.51
2016	604,894.39	4,703.10
2017	600,264.91	4,629.48
2018	597,245.73	3,019.18
2019	588,710.17	8,535.56
2020	584,421.14	4,289.03
2021	578,825.25	5,595.89
2022	572,875.27	5,949.98
2023	565,912.30	6,962.97
2024	547,776.16	18,136.14

=== REDD+ reference level and monitoring ===
Under the UNFCCC REDD+ framework, Bolivia has submitted a national forest reference emission level (FREL). On the UNFCCC REDD+ Web Platform, the country’s 2023 submission is listed as “under technical assessment”; safeguards information is listed as reported, while a national strategy and a national forest monitoring system are listed as “not reported”.

The 2023 submission, titled Nivel de Referencia de Emisiones Forestales por la Deforestación del Estado Plurinacional de Bolivia, covers the REDD+ activity “reducing emissions from deforestation” at national scale. It defines the proposed benchmark as the average annual gross emissions from deforestation over the 2016–2021 period, corresponding to 99,390,557 t CO2 eq per year.

The submission describes deforestation as the conversion of forest land to other land uses such as cropland, pasture, wetlands, settlements or other lands, and includes changes in above-ground and below-ground biomass. It reports CO2 only, while noting that quantification of other greenhouse gases from biomass burning is pending further data availability.

== Endangered species ==
There are 452 species endemic to Bolivia classified by the IUCN Red List as threatened. Biodiversity loss in Bolivia can be mainly attributed to illegal wildlife trade, climate change, deforestation, and habitat destruction. Poor land management in Bolivia's cattle ranching industry accounts for around 50% of habitat destruction in the country. Bolivia's economic conditions and rapid development have led the country to increasingly rely on cultivating soybeans, producing fossil fuels, engaging in illicit logging, and other practices that further exacerbate habitat loss. A lack of historical road access in Bolivia has aided biodiversity conservation more than active conservation efforts, but the increased rate of development in the country has highlighted a need for more focused conservation policies in the face of growing biodiversity degradation.

== Waste ==
Waste management has a high level of urgency in Bolivia. The World Bank implemented a technical assistance program titled the Disaster Recovery and Vulnerability Reduction Project to increase the country's capacity for response to environmental disasters and the waste management made necessary by these events. The controls implemented include erosion and runoff control, fuel management, site sanitation, trash and construction debris management, pesticide management, dust control, and noise reduction.

=== Collection services ===
The Solid Waste Management (SWM) system in Bolivia relies heavily on open dumping, specifically in smaller communities. Open dumping is the act of disposing solid waste in a manner that may harm the environment, and leave the waste vulnerable to open burning, exposure to numerous environmental elements, and scavengers.

Geographical Information Systems (GIS) have been proven to have a positive impact on waste management in countries such as India and Uganda. When used in conjunction with waste management systems, GIS provides "better designation and handling of waste and disposal sites, improved observational safety reporting, and a more defined and proactive approach to Environmental Impact Assessment (EIA)."

=== Landfills and Recycling ===
In Bolivia, only 8% of landfills are regulated, and recycling is under 4% of the total waste generated in the country. In September 2019, COOPI implemented a waste management program in La Paz municipality titled "LaPazRecicla. Integrated approach to waste management in the municipality of La Paz, Bolivia. New technologies to promote the circular economy." This program focuses on increased sustainability in Bolivia's capitol through the implementation of waste treatment plants and related machinery, as well as awareness campaigns for the separation of waste.

== Pollution ==
=== Air ===
In Bolivia's eastern and Amazonian lowland areas, air quality remains high throughout the year, except during the four-month dry season when these regions are prone to fires. Fires have increased in these regions during the past few decades due to the expansion of agricultural activities.

Cities situated at altitudes above 2000 meters, such as La Paz, El Alto, and Cochabamba, face significant air pollution issues. These cities are home to nearly 50% of Bolivia's population and have grown rapidly since the 1950's. This swift expansion has led to an increase in the number of motor vehicles and industries (brick production, oil refineries, metal foundries, etc.) within these urban areas, making them the primary contributors to air pollution. Vehicular emissions contribute up to 35% to the particles in the air in these high altitude cities. Another major contributor to air pollution is the burning of agricultural and household waste. In some parts of these cities, the concentration of air particles smaller than 10 micrometers is 2.5 times higher than the Latin American and Caribbean average and comparable to heavily polluted South American cities such as Santiago and Mexico City.

Beyond urban areas, indoor air pollution affects almost 80% of the rural population. This issue stems from the extensive reliance on firewood and solid fuels for cooking within economically disadvantaged rural communities.

=== Water ===
Rapid low-density expansion of Bolivia's urban areas likely results in water pollution, as a result of insufficient sanitation coverage paired with a lack of wastewater treatment. The use of unregulated septic tanks likely exacerbates the problem.

== Climate change ==
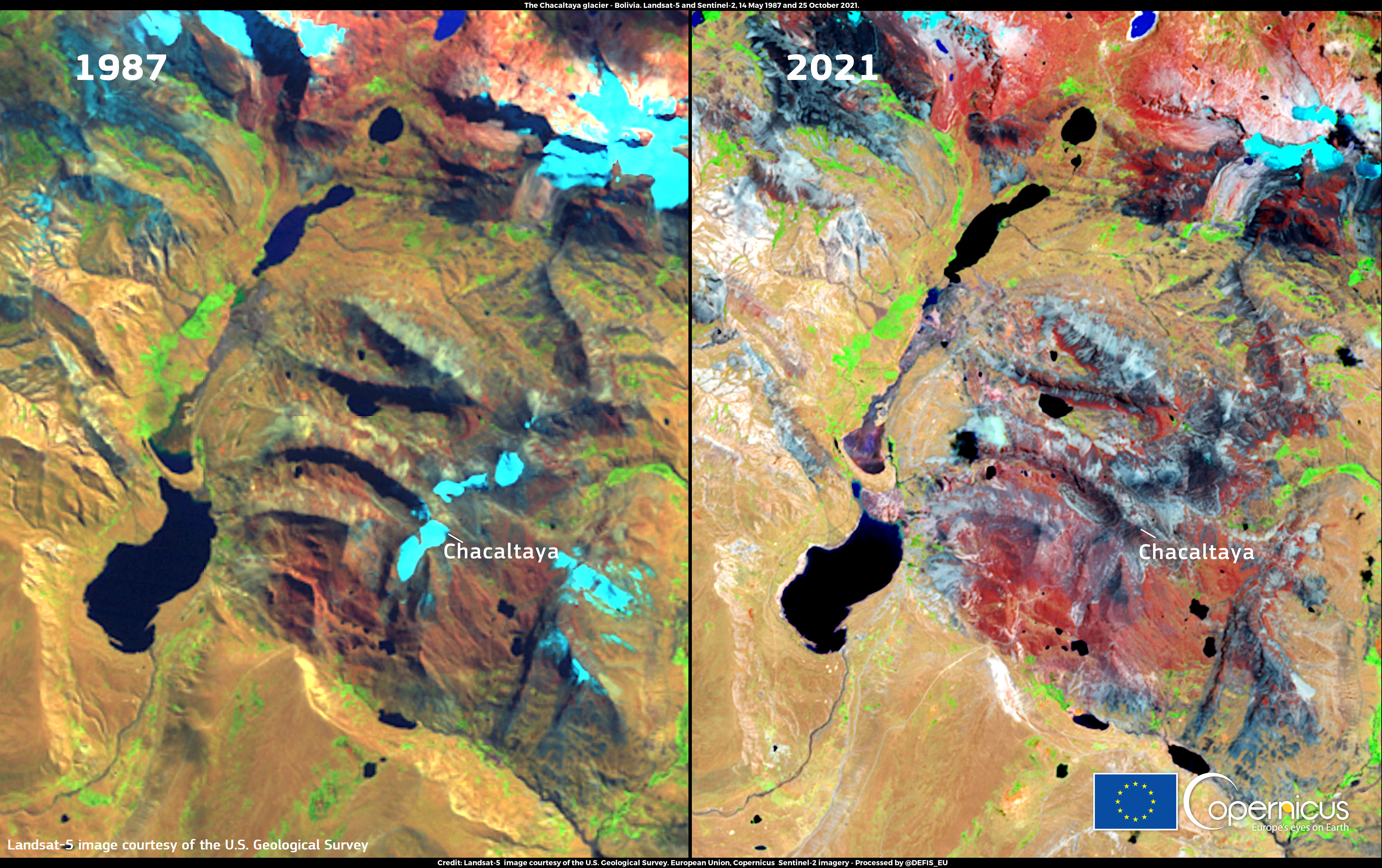
Shrinking Chacaltaya Glacier

Climate change in Bolivia has resulted in an average annual temperature increase of 0.1 °C per decade since 1939, and an increase in 0.15 °C per decade in the tropical Andes region from 1950 to 1994. Changes in air temperature and humidity have led to significant glacier retreat in the country's mountainous regions, including the Chacaltaya glacier losing 50% of its surface area and 66% of its volume since 1990, and the Charquini glacier losing 47.4% of its surface area since 1940. The rate at which glaciers are retreating in Bolivia exceeds predictions made by climate experts and could result in possible negative effects on water availability in the country. Climate change trends have increased mean annual precipitation by 15% in the Bolivian Amazon since 1970. Climate change has further exacerbated the severity of natural disasters caused by droughts and floods, leading to Bolivia ranking among the top 10 countries affected by natural disasters for the first time in 2007. In addition, climate change has resulted in increased rates of land degradation in the country, including increased erosion in areas affected by deforestation and an increase in the number and scale of forest fires.

== Solutions and policies ==
=== Forestry laws ===
In 1996, the Bolivian forestry law mandated management plans, harvest limits, and inventory documentation for forestry concessions. The law aimed to regulate the use of forest resources, promote sustainable forestry practices, and grant user rights to citizens on public and private lands. The law also established three national institutions for oversight, regulation, and funding. Additionally, the law recognizes indigenous groups' rights to forest resources. Concession rights on public lands necessitate a minimum annual royalty of $1 per hectare, though these rights are revocable if standards are not met or resources are misused.

In the early 1990s, Bolivia committed to the Convention on Biological Diversity, leading to the establishment of numerous protected areas in its lowland regions. These areas were created to conserve biodiversity and mitigate deforestation. Later in 2006, further reforms to land tenure and forestry management were introduced, aiming to better integrate indigenous communities through community-based forest management. However, these reforms faced challenges due to inadequate follow-up and enforcement, resulting in a weakened forestry regime.

By 2009, a co-management approach was adopted for protected areas, involving collaboration among the protected area service, indigenous groups, and farmer organizations. Despite this progress, the re-election of Evo Morales in the same year marked a shift in policy. Protected areas and conservation initiatives experienced a weakening, as populist and productivist policies took precedence. This shift became evident with the introduction of a 2015 decree that facilitated hydrocarbon activities within protected areas, accompanied by reduced funding, staff reductions, and increased repression of environmental and indigenous groups opposing extraction activities.

From 2010 to 2016, however, no Protected Area Downgrading, Downsizing, and Degazettement (PADDD) events were reported in Bolivia. However, in 2017, the highway project across TIPNIS led to a downgrade in the area's protected status. Throughout this period, the law also established the category of "community lands of origin" for indigenous lands and initiated a land formalization program, supported by international donors and the state. This initiative resulted in an increase in indigenous lands, collectively-owned community lands, and public lands, contributing to the broader efforts of environmental conservation and sustainable land management in Bolivia.

=== Hydropolitics ===
Water has become a contested resource in Bolivia due to increasing competition and unequal distribution. The high stakes of water access led in part to 1999's Cochabamba Water War, which consisted of a series of protests in support of deprivatizing water.

== See also ==
- Geography of Bolivia
- Deforestation of the Amazon Rainforest
- Amazon Rainforest
