= Germán Jordán Province =

Province of Bolivia

Coordinates: 17°34′S 66°23′W

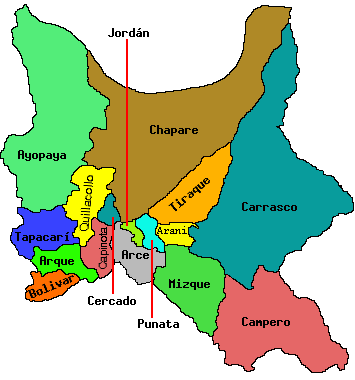
Location within the Cochabamba Department

Germán Jordán is a province in the Cochabamba Department, Bolivia. Its capital is Cliza. Many people from Germán Jordán province, along with people from neighboring Esteban Arze and Punata province have migrated to Argentina and to the Washington, D.C. area.

== Subdivision ==
Germán Jordán Province is divided into three municipalities which are further subdivided into cantons.

Section	Municipality	Seat
1st	Cliza Municipality	Cliza
2nd	Toco Municipality	Toco
3rd	Tolata Municipality	Tolata
