= Health in Bolivia =

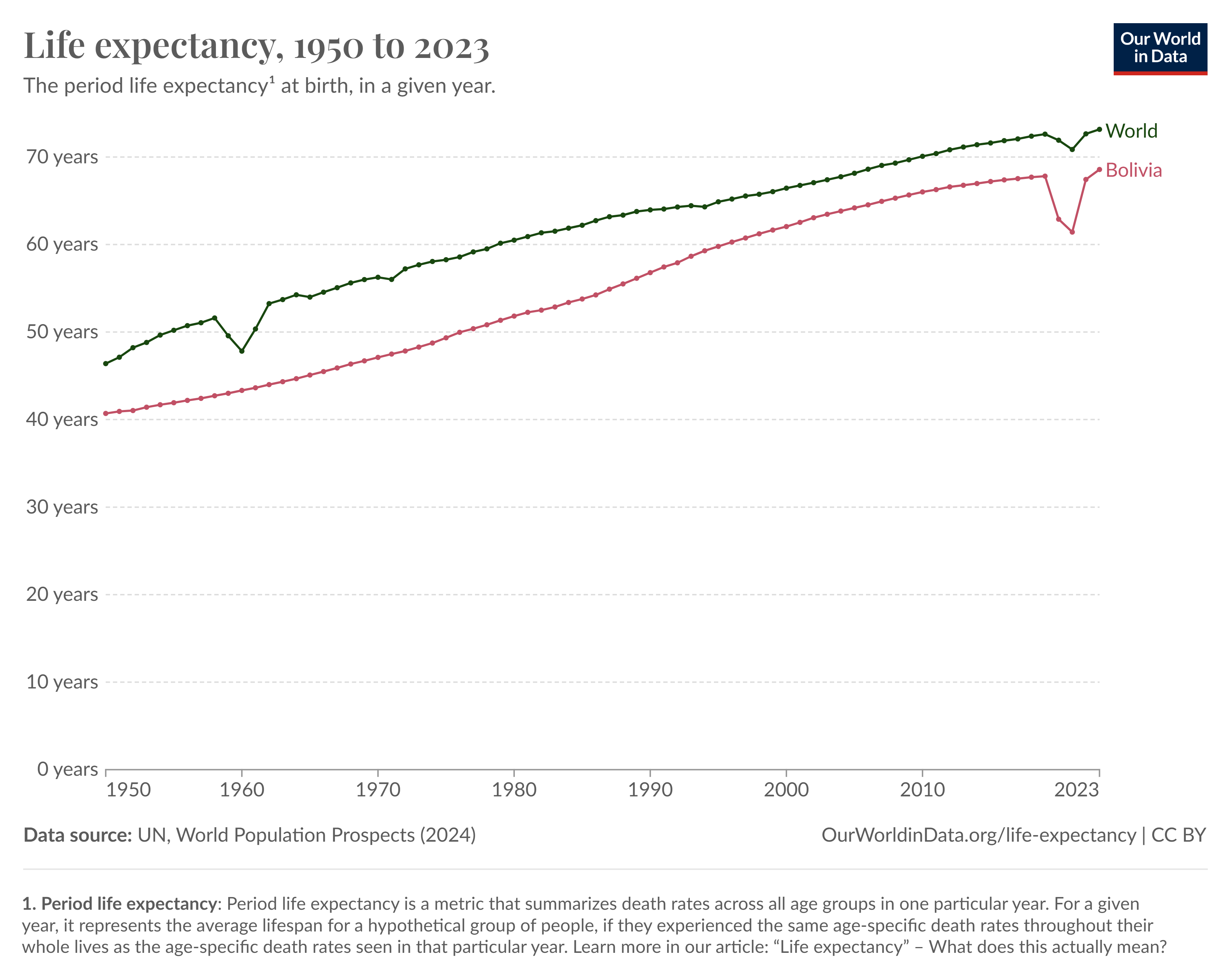
Figure 1. Evolution of life expectancy at birth in Bolivia compared to the worldwide trend during the 1950-2023 period.

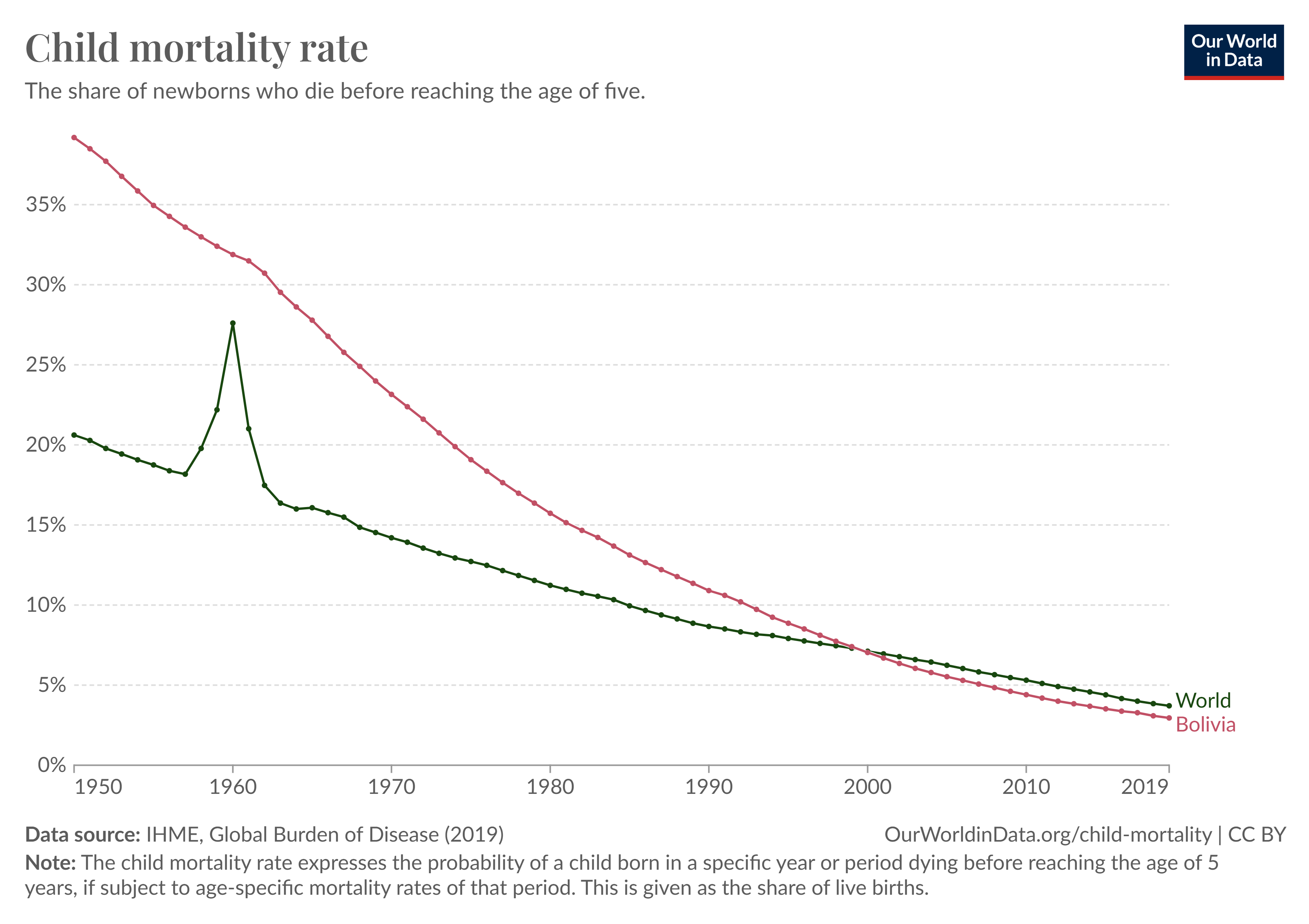
Figure 2. Child mortality rate of Bolivia compared to the world during the 1990-2019 period.

Considering the main health indicators, Bolivia has made improvements over the last decades. Since 1950, life expectancy at birth (Figure 1) has considerably improved from 40.7 years to 68.6 years in 2023, falling a little behind the world trend (73.2 years). Child mortality rate (Figure 2) has greatly decreased since 1950, from 39.2% to 2.95% in 2019, being slightly lower than the world's rate (3.71%). Maternal health although has improved considerably, maternal mortality ratio (Figure 3) continues to be higher (205.49 deaths per 100,000 live births) than the world's ratio (158.84 deaths per 100,000 live births) in 2021.

According to data from the United Nations Development Programme, Bolivia has a human development index (HDI) value of 0.698 for 2022, positioning in the medium human development category at position 120 out of 193. Since the 90s, HDI value increased from 0.546 to 0.698.

However, according to the Human Rights Measurement Initiative, Bolivia falls into the category in the very bad in ensuring the exercise of right to health, with 74.7% of the HMRI value for 2021, for which, better management of its income is required for improvement.

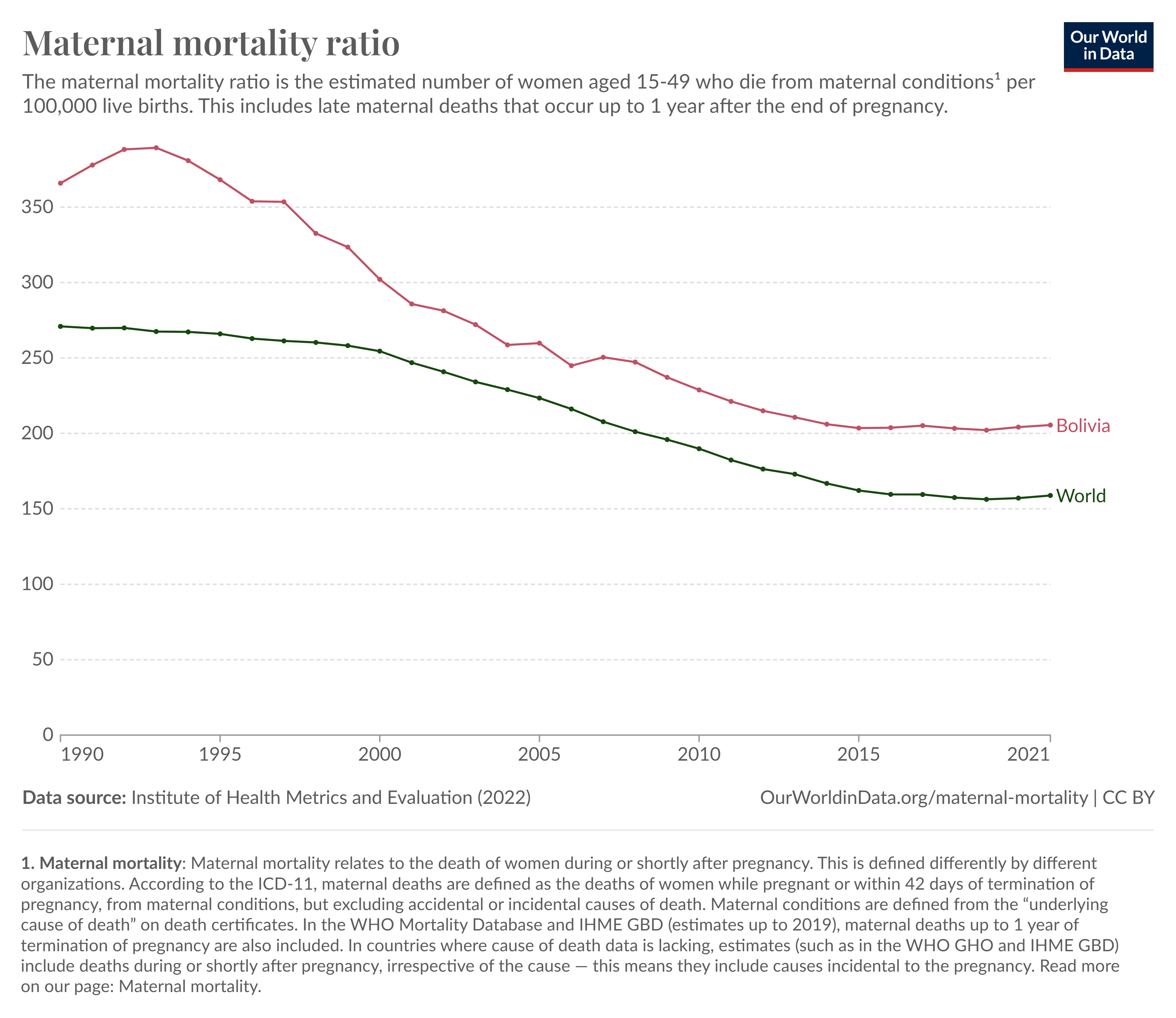
Figure 3. Maternal mortality ratio per 100,000 live births of Bolivia compared to the world during the 1990-2021 period.

== Health system ==
Bolivia's health system has been mainly financed by the government, the social health insurance contributions and the out of pocket spending for years. An additional 12.5% of the population is covered under the Sumi (mothers and children under 5 years old) and Health Insurance of the Elderly (over 60 years old) programs. Nonetheless, health expenditure has changed over the years, as observed in Table 1, since 2000 the public funding of healthcare has increased about 3.2%, and the out of pocket expenditure has decreased in 12.24%.

Table 1. Comparison of Health Expenditure of Bolivia from 2000 to 2020
	2000	2020
Current health expenditure as percentage of gross domestic product (GDP) (%)	4.40	8.02
Government health expenditure of GDP (%)	2.4	5.6
Out of pocket expenditure of total current health expenditure (%)	33.51	21.27

=== National Health Insurance (SUS) ===
In 2019, the national health insurance, known as SUS from its initials in Spanish, Seguro Único de Salud, was implemented, aiming to provide primary, secondary and tertiary health services to the population. Nevertheless, the impact of SUS in increasing access to quality healthcare has been very limited. In 2022, the public entity in charge of defending the rights of its citizens, Defensoría del Pueblo de Bolivia, published a report of the evaluation of SUS, in which they identified its main problems and limitations. The deficiencies identified in the implementation of SUS include:

- Lack of guidelines for quality control in infrastructure, healthcare services and human resources for each level of healthcare center.
- Insufficient medical personnel, medicines, and beds for hospitalization.
- Bureaucracy procedures, because although the contracts of healthcare personnel increased in the last years, they still do not reach hospitals due to paperwork and technical formalities.
- Lack of internal auditories.
- Deficient divulgation of information to the population about the benefits provided by SUS.
- Delayed reference of patients due to errors in filling the forms and the handwriting of the medical personnel.

== Health status ==
=== Diseases ===
Bolivians living in rural areas lack proper sanitation and medical services, rendering many helpless against still potent diseases such as malaria (in tropical areas) and Chagas disease. Statistics indicate that 20 percent of the rural population in Bolivia has access to safe water and sanitation.

Major infectious diseases with high degree of risk are:

- food or waterborne diseases: bacterial diarrhea, hepatitis A, and typhoid fever
- vectorborne diseases: dengue fever, malaria, and yellow fever
- water contact disease: leptospirosis (2009)

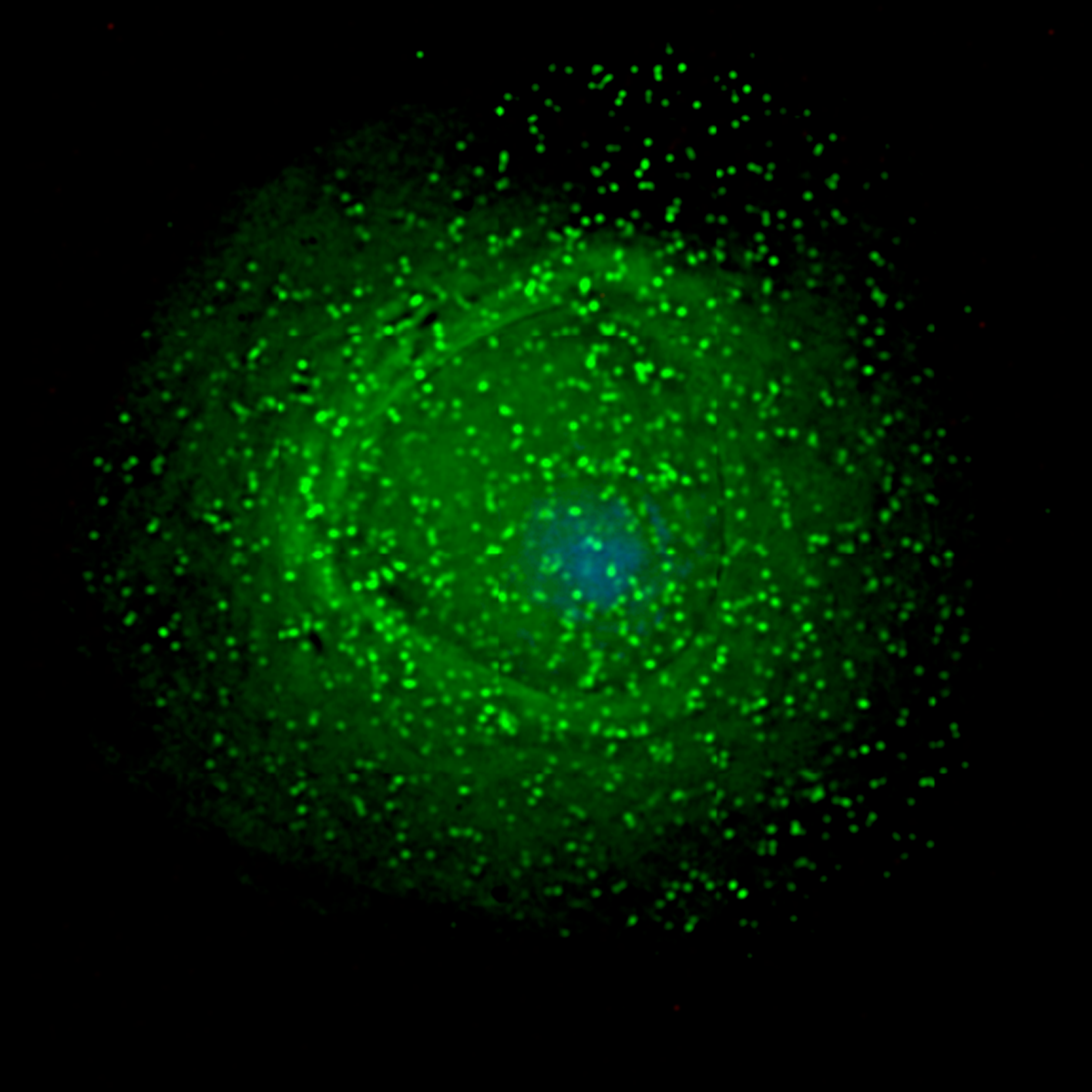
HIV-1 particles assembling at the surface of an infected macrophage.

=== HIV/AIDS ===
UNAIDS, which included estimates of unknown cases, reported in 2005 that 7,000 people in Bolivia were HIV-infected, but estimates vary widely between 3,800 and 17,000 people.

HIV prevalence rates in Bolivia are highest among MSM, who had infection levels of 15 percent in La Paz and nearly 24 percent in Santa Cruz, according to a 2005 report cited by UNAIDS. Homeless boys and girls also appear to be vulnerable to HIV infection. A recent study of street youth in Cochabamba found that 3.5 percent were HIV-positive. In part because of governmental regulation that requires sex workers to regularly visit sexually transmitted infection (STI) clinics for checkups, HIV rates among sex workers have remained low. Patterns from other countries in the region suggest that Bolivian sex workers may be another population at risk for HIV/AIDS.

=== Obesity ===
Obesity is a growing health concern. 20.2% of Bolivians are obese.

=== Cocaine ===
The Bolivia section of country studies published by the Federal Research Division of the Library of Congress of the USA mentions the following:

Bolivia's booming cocaine industry was also spawning serious health problems for Bolivian youth. In the 1980s, Bolivia became a drug-consuming country, as well as a principal exporter of cocaine. Addiction to coca paste, a cocaine by-product in the form of a cigarette called 'pitillo', was spreading rapidly among city youths. Pitillos were abundantly available in schools and at social gatherings. Other youths who worked as coca-leaf stompers (pisadores), dancing all night on kerosene and acid-soaked leaves, also commonly became addicted. The pitillo addict suffered from serious physical and psychological side-effects caused by highly toxic impurities contained in the unrefined coca paste. Coca-paste addiction statistics were unavailable, and drug treatment centers were practically nonexistent.

In its 2007 Annual Report, the United Nations-dependent International Narcotics Control Board (IFB) called on the government of Bolivia to act immediately to abolish uses of the coca leaf that are contrary to the 1961 Convention. The report further questioned the commercial uses of coca leaves in the production of tea, matte and flour, citing these uses were in contradiction to international drug control treaties. The Bolivian government declined to comply, and sent the Minister of Government, Alfredo Rada to the 51st UN Commission on Narcotics. At that meeting, Rada stated, "Bolivia will defend coca leaf against any threats against traditional leaf consumption by certain international agencies" citing that the traditional uses of the coca leaf were part of the political movement that helped put Evo Morales in office. Rada also pointed to a previous UN declaration of the rights of indigenous peoples, which he used to protect the chewing of the coca leaf as an indigenous tradition. Coca leaf is the raw material of cocaine and its cultivation is considered illegal by the UN.

Evo Morales himself attended the 52nd Session of the UN Narcotics Commission where he spoke in defense of coca leaf production and use. With coca leaves in hand, Morales stated that Bolivia would not prohibit all legally grown coca, but would restrict the excess cultivation of the plant. Morales indicated government efforts to reduce coca production beyond legal uses as the excess production is what ends up in the drug industry. Morales's administration sued the UN Commission in an attempt to have coca leaves removed from the global list of narcotics. In showing the coca leaves, he said, "This is not cocaine" to which he received applause. "I am a consumer of coca", he declared, placing leaves in his mouth and chewing them, to which he again received applause. Morales stated that not only indigenous people use coca leaf, but also other groups including students, miners, professionals and others. Morales claimed that the coca leaf in its natural state has medicinal and nutritional qualities and does not cause harm. He explained that the country's recently approved Political Constitution protects the coca leaf and its cultural heritage because the plant in its natural state is not narcotic. He then went on to ask the commission to include in its list of global narcotics several substances produced with coca leaves as an ingredient, including cocaine hydrochloride, cocaine base paste and cocaine sulfate.

=== Malnutrition ===
Malnutrition is widespread in Bolivia, as Bolivia is the second poorest country to Haiti in the Western Hemisphere and has two thirds of its population below the World Bank poverty benchmark of $2.00/day." To date, there has been substantial foreign food aid implemented in Bolivia, which include initiatives from the USAID, FHI (Food Health International), and the Global Food for Education Initiative. This foreign food aid offers an appreciable supply of food for the impoverished families in Bolivia but is primarily wheat grain, which holds limited nutritional value.

There have been initiatives led by FHI with their aid effort in Bolivia by implementing two programs aimed specifically at Health and Food Security, and Agricultural Intensification and Income Production. Although these two programs have the same initiative of improving the health of Bolivians, they are actually competing against each other. This is due to their different priorities. The health and food security team embrace a more healthy diet for the population while the agricultural team is working towards increasing the marketability of crops. As a result, these two programs have begun to pull the food aid policy in opposite directions.

This is further emphasized by the instance where the highly nutritional quinoa has been the target and focus for export to the developed world, with the incentive of economic development in Bolivia. This has caused inflation for quinoa for locals and as a result, the locals rarely consume quinoa, even though the vast majority know of its superior nutritional value."

=== Lead poisoning ===
In 2015, the Bolivian Food Technology Institute (ITA) revealed that the content of lead in table salt was about 400% higher than the permitted maximum according to Bolivian food standards which is 2 μg/g. This study analyzed 23 brands of the most widely consumed brands of table salt and determined the lead content to be between 7.23 μg/g and 9.48 μg/g. Since table salt is the most commonly and widely used food additive, there exists a potential of chronic lead poisoning of the entire population.

=== Maternal and child health care ===
Under-5 mortality in 2019 was 26, half of what it was in 2006. Infant mortality was 21.2 in 2019, approximately half of what it was in 2006. Bolivia's maternal mortality rate is 160 per 100,000 which makes it one of the highest in the region and it is estimated to be even higher. Before Evo Morales took office nearly half of all infants were not vaccinated and now nearly all are.

== See also ==
- Water supply and sanitation in Bolivia
