= Toco, Cochabamba =

Toco / Toko T'uqu
- Location of Toko within Bolivia
- Coordinates: 17°37′0″S 65°54′0″W
- Country: Bolivia
- Department: Cochabamba Department
- Province: Germán Jordán Province
- Municipality: Toco Municipality
- Canton: Toko Canton

Population (2001)
  - Total: 827
- Time zone: UTC-4 (BOT)

Toco or Toko (from Quechua: T'uqu) is a locality in the Cochabamba Department in central Bolivia. It is the seat of the Toco Municipality, the second municipal section of the Germán Jordán Province. At the time of census 2001 it had a population of 827.
