= Toco Municipality =

- Municipality
- Flag

- Location within Bolivia
- Coordinates: 17°40′S 65°55′W
- Country: Bolivia
- Department: Cochabamba Department
- Province: Germán Jordán Province
- Seat: Toco

Government
  - Mayor: Guillermo Rios Ovando (2007)
  - President: Rogelio Fernández Luján (2007)

Population (2001)
  - Total: 6,705
  - Ethnicities: Quechuas
- Time zone: UTC-4 (BOT)

Toco Municipality (also Toko Municipality) is the second municipal section of the Germán Jordán Province in the Cochabamba Department, Bolivia. Its seat is Toco.

The municipality consists of only one canton, Toco Canton (or Toko Canton). It is identical to the municipality.
