= List of Bolivia-related topics =

The location of the Republic of Bolivia

The following is an outline of topics related to the Republic of Bolivia.

== Bolivia ==
- Bolivia
- Environmental issues in Bolivia
- Foreign aid to Bolivia
- ISO 3166-1 alpha-2 country code for Bolivia: BO
- ISO 3166-1 alpha-3 country code for Bolivia: BOL
- ISO 3166-2:BO region codes for Bolivia
- Tupac Katari Guerrilla Army

== Buildings and structures in Bolivia ==
- Basilica of Our Lady of Copacabana
- Palacio Quemado

=== Airports in Bolivia ===
- List of airports in Bolivia
- La Paz / El Alto: El Alto International Airport
- Cochabamba: Jorge Wilstermann International Airport
- Sucre: Juana Azurduy de Padilla International Airport
- Santa Cruz: Viru Viru International Airport
- Santa Cruz: El Trompillo Airport

=== Archaeological sites in Bolivia ===
- Chiripa
- El Fuerte de Samaipata
- Incallajta
- Oroncota
- Tiwanaku

=== Astronomical observatories in Bolivia ===
- Chacaltaya
- Tarija

=== Sports venues in Bolivia ===
==== Football venues in Bolivia ====
- Estadio Félix Capriles
- Estadio Hernando Siles
- Estadio IV Centenário
- Estadio Jesús Bermúdez
- Estadio Libertador Simón Bolivar
- Estadio Mario Mercado Vaca Guzmán
- Estadio Olímpico Patria
- Estadio Rafael Mendoza
- Estadio Ramón Tahuichi Aguilera

== Cities in Bolivia ==
- List of cities in Bolivia
- Achacachi
- Arani (Bolivia)
- Arque
- Camiri
- Capinota
- Caranavi
- Cobija
- Cochabamba
- Copacabana, Bolivia
- Coroico
- El Alto
- Inquisivi
- La Higuera
- La Paz
- Mizque
- Montero
- Orinoca
- Oruro, Bolivia
- Potosí
- Presto, Bolivia
- Puerto Suárez
- Punata
- Quillacollo
- Riberalta
- Sacaba
- Santa Cruz de la Sierra
- Sucre
- Tapacarí
- Tarija, Bolivia
- Tiraque
- Torotoro (Bolivia)
- Trinidad, Bolivia
- Tupiza
- Uyuni
- Vallegrande
- Villa Tunari
- Villamontes

== Communications in Bolivia ==
- Communications in Bolivia
- .bo Internet country code top-level domain for Bolivia
- List of people on stamps of Bolivia

== Conservation in Bolivia ==
- Comunidad Inti Wara Yassi

=== National parks of Bolivia ===
- List of national parks of Bolivia
- Amboró National Park
- Madidi
- Noel Kempff Mercado National Park
- Torotoro National Park

=== World Heritage Sites in Bolivia ===
- Jesuit Missions of Chiquitos
- El Fuerte de Samaipata
- Noel Kempff Mercado National Park
- Potosí
- Sucre
- Template:World Heritage Sites in Bolivia
- Tiwanaku

== Bolivian culture ==
- Culture of Bolivia
- Ayllus
- Carnaval de Oruro
- Coat of arms of Bolivia
- Ekeko
- Flag of Bolivia
- National Anthem of Bolivia
- Public holidays in Bolivia
- Tinku

=== Bolivian art ===
==== Bolivian artists ====
- Alfredo Da Silva
- Roberto Berdecio
- Graciela Rodo Boulanger
- Alejandra Dorado
- Ivar Mendez
- Nilo Soruco
- Francisco Tito Yupanqui

=== Bolivian cinema ===
==== Bolivian films ====
- List of Bolivian films

==== Bolivian film directors ====
- José Maria Velasco Maidana

=== Bolivian music ===
- Music of Bolivia
- Grupo Aymara
- Luzmila Carpio

==== Bolivian musical groups ====
- Khanata
- Los Jairas
- Los Kjarkas
- Paja Brava

==== Bolivian musicians ====
- Hernán Ergueta
- Emma Junaro
- Gladys Moreno
- Zulma Yugar

=== Bolivian cuisine ===
- Anticuchos
- Chuflay
- Guinea pig
- Locro
- Pique macho
- Salteñas
- Singani
- Silpancho
- Yungueño
- Green iguana
- Roasted duck

=== Languages of Bolivia ===
- Arawakan languages
- Ayacucho Quechua
- Aymara language
- Barbacoan languages
- Eastern Bolivian Guarani
- Guaraní language
- Itonama language
- Plautdietsch
- Puquina language
- Quechua
- Qusqu-Qullaw
- Saraveca
- South Bolivian Quechua
- Southern Quechua
- Spanish language

=== Bolivian literature ===
==== Bolivian writers ====
- Alcides Arguedas
- Yolanda Bedregal
- Javier del Granado
- Jaime Saenz
- Pedro Shimose
- Gastón Suárez
- Arturo von Vacano

===== Bolivian children's writers =====
- Ben Mikaelsen

=== Religion in Bolivia ===
- Religion in Bolivia
- Islam in Bolivia
- Roman Catholicism in Bolivia

==== Bolivian prelates ====
===== Bolivian bishops =====
- Archbishop Francisco Ramón Herboso y Figueroa

===== Bolivian cardinals =====
- Cardinal Julio Terrazas Sandoval

== Economy of Bolivia ==
- Economy of Bolivia
- Bolivian boliviano

=== Companies of Bolivia ===
- YPFB

=== Ports and harbours of Bolivia ===
- Puerto Aguirre
- Puerto Quijarro
- Puerto Suárez

=== Tourism in Bolivia ===
- List of national parks of Bolivia
- Madidi

=== Trade unions of Bolivia ===
- Bolivian Workers' Center
- Confederación Sindical Única de Trabajadores Campesinos de Bolivia
- Corriente de Renovación Independiente y Solidaridad Laboral
- Federación Sindical de Trabajadores Mineros de Bolivia

== Education in Bolivia ==
- Education in Bolivia
- List of universities in Bolivia

=== Schools in Bolivia ===
- American Cooperative School of La Paz
- American Educational Association
- Cochabamba Cooperative School
- ABC Spanish Tuition School, La Paz - Bolivia

== Ethnic groups in Bolivia ==
- Aymara people
- Bororo people
- Guarani people
- Quechuas
- Tsimane' (aka Chimane)
- Yuracaré

== Fauna of Bolivia ==
- Andean cat
- Andean cock-of-the-rock
- Andean condor
- Andean tinamou
- Argentine grey fox
- Bolivian squirrel
- Bothrops atrox
- Brown tinamou
- Buffy broad-nosed bat
- Bush dog
- Crab-eating fox
- Dark fruit-eating bat
- Elegant rice rat
- Geoffroy's cat
- Grey tinamou
- Hoffmann's two-toed sloth
- Jaguar
- Lachesis muta
- Maned wolf
- Margay
- Minor long-nosed long-tongued bat
- Pampas cat
- Pampas fox
- Paradise jacamar
- Paradise tanager
- Puff-legs
- Puna tinamou
- red-winged tinamou
- Sechura fox
- Short-eared dog
- Short-headed broad-nosed bat
- Variegated tinamou
- white-lined broad-nosed bat
- white-throated tinamou

== Geography of Bolivia ==
- Geography of Bolivia
- Altiplano
- Amazon Basin
- El Mutún
- Incallajta
- Pantanal
- Salar de Uyuni
- Strait of Tiquina
- Yungas

=== Subdivisions of Bolivia ===
- ISO 3166-2:BO
- Atacama Department
- Municipalities of Bolivia
- Provinces of Bolivia
- Departments of Bolivia

=== Lakes of Bolivia ===
- Poopó Lake
- Lake Titicaca
- Laguna Verde, Bolivia

=== Maps of Bolivia ===
- Maps of Bolivia

==== Maps of the history of Bolivia ====
- Maps of Bolivia

=== Mountains of Bolivia ===
- Acotango
- Anallajsi
- Cabaray
- Chacaltaya
- Columa
- Cordillera Central, Bolivia
- Cordillera de Lípez
- Cordillera Real (Bolivia)
- Cordillera Occidental, Bolivia
- Cordillera Oriental, Bolivia
- Illampu
- Illimani
- Iru Phutunqu
- Licancabur
- Lípez
- Laram Q'awa
- Mururata
- Michincha
- Nuevo Mundo
- Olca
- Paquni
- Parina Quta
- Paruma
- Patilla Pata
- Pomerape
- Sacabaya
- Sajama
- Tata Sabaya
- Wayna Potosí

=== Rivers of Bolivia ===
- Abuna River
- Arque River
- Beni River
- Bermejo River
- Caine River
- Madeira River
- Madre de Dios River
- Mamoré
- Paraguay River
- Pilcomayo River
- Río Grande (Bolivia)
- Yacuma River

=== Ski areas and resorts in Bolivia ===
- Chacaltaya

=== Subdivisions of Bolivia ===
- Departments of Bolivia
- Provinces of Bolivia

==== Provinces of Bolivia ====
- Provinces of Bolivia
- Abel Iturralde Province
- Alonso de Ibáñez Province
- Aniceto Arce Province
- Antonio Quijarro Province
- Arani Province
- Aroma Province
- Arque Province
- Atahuallpa Province
- Ayopaya Province
- Bautista Saavedra Province
- Belisario Boeto Province
- Bernardino Bilbao Province
- Bolívar Province, Bolivia
- Burnet O'Connor Province
- Capinota Province
- Caranavi Province
- Carangas Province
- Carrasco Province (Bolivia)
- Cercado Province (Beni)
- Cercado Province (Cochabamba)
- Cercado Province (Oruro)
- Cercado Province (Tarija)
- Chapare Province
- Charcas Province
- Chayanta Province
- Chiquitos Province
- Cordillera Province (Bolivia)
- Cornelio Saavedra Province
- Daniel Campos Province
- Eduardo Avaroa Province
- Eliodoro Camacho Province
- Enrique Baldivieso Province
- Esteban Arce Province
- Eustaquio Méndez Province
- Florida Province
- Franz Tamayo Province
- Germán Busch Province
- Germán Jordán Province
- Gran Chaco Province
- Gualberto Villarroel Province
- Hernando Siles Province
- Ingavi Province
- Inquisivi Province
- Iténez Province
- Jaime Zudáñez Province
- José Ballivián Province
- José Manuel Pando Province
- José María Avilés Province
- José María Linares Province
- Juana Azurduy de Padilla Province
- Ladislao Cabrera Province
- Larecaja Province
- Litoral Province (Bolivia)
- Loayza Province
- Los Andes Province (Bolivia)
- Luis Calvo Province
- Mamoré Province
- Manco Kapac Province
- Marbán Province
- Mizque Province
- Modesto Omiste Province
- Moxos Province
- Muñecas Province
- Narciso Campero Province
- Nor Carangas Province
- Nor Chichas Province
- Nor Cinti Province
- Nor Lípez Province
- Nor Yungas Province
- Omasuyos Province
- Oropeza Province
- Pacajes Province
- Pantaléon Dalence Province
- Pedro Domingo Murillo Province
- Poopó Province
- Puerto de Mejillones Province
- Punata Province
- Quillacollo Province
- Rafael Bustillo Province
- Sajama Province
- San Pedro de Totora Province
- Sara Province
- Saucarí Province
- Sebastián Pagador Province
- Sud Carangas Province
- Sud Chichas Province
- Sud Cinti Province
- Sud Lípez Province
- Sud Yungas Province
- Tapacarí Province
- Tiraque Province
- Tomas Barrón Province
- Tomina Province
- Tomás Frías Province
- Vaca Diéz Province
- Vallegrande Province
- Yacuma Province
- Yamparáez Province

=== Volcanoes of Bolivia ===
- Acotango
- Nevado Anallajsi
- Cabaray
- Cerro Columa
- Irruputuncu
- Licancabur
- Cerro Lípez
- Macizo de Larancagua
- Macizo de Pacuni
- Cerro Minchincha
- Nevadoes de Quimsachata
- Nuevo Mundo volcano
- Olca
- Parinacota Volcano
- Paruma
- Patilla Pata
- Pomerape
- Sacabaya
- Nevado Sajama
- Tata Sabaya

=== Natural Disasters of Bolivia ===
- 1994 Bolivia earthquake

=== Bolivia geography stubs ===
- Abel Iturralde Province
- Abuna River
- Alonso de Ibáñez Province
- Amboró National Park
- Aniceto Arce Province
- Antonio Quijarro Province
- Apolo, La Paz
- Arani (Bolivia)
- Arani Province
- Aroma Province
- Arque
- Arque Province
- Atacama Department
- Atahuallpa Province
- Ayopaya
- Ayopaya Province
- Lake Ballivián
- Bautista Saavedra Province
- Belisario Boeto Province
- Beni River
- Bernardino Bilbao Province
- Bolívar Province (Bolivia)
- Burnet O'Connor Province
- Caine River
- Capinota Province
- Caranavi
- Carangas Province
- Carrasco Province (Bolivia)
- Catavi
- Cercado Province (Beni)
- Cercado Province (Cochabamba)
- Cercado Province (Oruro)
- Cercado Province (Tarija)
- Cerro Columa
- Cerro Lípez
- Chalalan
- Chapare Province
- Charcas Province
- Chayanta Province
- Chiquitos Province
- Chulumani
- Chuquiago
- Chuquisaca Department
- Cobija
- Cochabamba Department
- Copacabana, Bolivia
- Cordillera Occidental, Bolivia
- Cordillera Oriental, Bolivia
- Cordillera Province (Bolivia)
- Cordillera Real (Bolivia)
- Cordillera de Lípez
- Cornelio Saavedra Province
- Coroico
- Daniel Campos Province
- Eduardo Avaroa Province
- El Alto
- El Fuerte de Samaipata
- Eliodoro Camacho Province
- Enrique Baldivieso Province
- Esteban Arce Province
- Eustaquio Méndez Province
- Florida Province
- Franz Tamayo Province
- Germán Busch Province
- Germán Jordán Province
- Gran Chaco Province
- Gualberto Villarroel Province
- Hernando Siles Province
- Huayna Potosí
- Ingavi Province
- Inquisivi
- Inquisivi Province
- Isla del Sol
- Iténez Province
- Jaime Zudáñez Province
- José Ballivián Province
- José Manuel Pando Province
- José María Avilés Province
- José María Linares Province
- Juana Azurduy de Padilla Province
- La Plata Basin
- Ladislao Cabrera Province
- Laguna Verde, Bolivia
- Larecaja Province
- Licancabur
- Litoral Province (Bolivia)
- Loayza Province
- Los Andes Province (Bolivia)
- Luis Calvo Province
- Madidi
- Mamoré Province
- Manco Kapac Province
- Marbán Province
- Mizque
- Mizque Province
- Modesto Omiste Province
- Montero
- Mount Copaja
- Moxos savanna
- Moxos Province
- Muela del diablo
- Muñecas Province
- Narciso Campero Province
- Nevado Anallajsi
- Nevado Sajama
- Nor Carangas Province
- Nor Chichas Province
- Nor Cinti Province
- Nor Lípez Province
- Nor Yungas Province
- Omasuyos Province
- Oropeza Province
- Oruro Department
- Oruro, Bolivia
- Pacajes Province
- Palacio Quemado
- Patacamaya
- Pampagrande
- Pando Department
- Pantaléon Dalence Province
- Parinacota Province
- Pedro Domingo Murillo Province
- Pomerape
- Poopó Province
- Poopó Province
- Presto, Bolivia
- Provinces of Bolivia
- Puerto Aguirre
- Puerto Busch
- Puerto Quijarro
- Puerto Suárez
- Puerto de Mejillones Province
- Punata
- Punata Province
- Quillacollo
- Quillacollo Province
- Rafael Bustillo Province
- Riberalta
- Rurrenabaque
- Sajama Province
- Samaipata, Bolivia
- San Pedro de Totora Province
- Sara Province
- Saucarí Province
- Sebastián Pagador Province
- Siglo XX
- Sorata
- Strait of Tiquina
- Sucre
- Sud Carangas Province
- Sud Chichas Province
- Sud Cinti Province
- Sud Lípez Province
- Sud Yungas Province
- Tapacarí
- Tapacarí Province
- Tarija, Bolivia
- Template:Bolivia-geo-stub
- Tiraque
- Tiraque Province
- Tomas Barrón Province
- Tomina Province
- Tomás Frías Province
- Tupiza
- Uyuni
- Vaca Diéz Province
- Vallegrande
- Vallegrande Province
- Viacha
- Villa Tunari
- Villamontes
- Yacuma Province
- Yacuma River
- Yamparáez Province
- Yungas

== Government of Bolivia ==
- Foreign relations of Bolivia
- National Congress of Bolivia
- Palacio Quemado

=== Presidents of Bolivia ===
- President of Bolivia
- José María Achá
- Aniceto Arce
- Mariano Baptista
- Adolfo Ballivián
- Hugo Ballivián
- Hugo Banzer
- René Barrientos
- Manuel Isidoro Belzu
- Carlos Blanco Galindo
- Simón Bolívar
- Germán Busch
- Narciso Campero
- Jorge Córdova
- Hilarión Daza
- Severo Fernández
- Luis García Meza Tejada
- Lidia Gueiler Tejada
- Wálter Guevara
- Néstor Guillén
- José Gutiérrez Guerra
- Felipe Segundo Guzmán
- Enrique Hertzog
- José María Linares
- Mariano Melgarejo
- Carlos Mesa
- Tomás Monje
- Ismael Montes
- Agustín Morales
- Evo Morales
- Alberto Natusch
- Alfredo Ovando Candía
- Gregorio Pacheco
- David Padilla
- José Manuel Pando
- Víctor Paz Estenssoro
- Jaime Paz Zamora
- Juan Pereda
- Enrique Peñaranda
- Carlos Quintanilla
- Jorge Quiroga
- Eduardo Rodríguez
- Bautista Saavedra
- Daniel Salamanca Urey
- Gonzalo Sánchez de Lozada
- Andrés de Santa Cruz
- Hernando Siles Reyes
- Luis Adolfo Siles Salinas
- Hernán Siles Zuazo
- Antonio José de Sucre
- José Luis Tejada Sorzano
- Tomás Frías Ametller
- David Toro
- Celso Torrelio
- Juan José Torres
- Mamerto Urriolagoitía
- Gualberto Villarroel
- Eliodoro Villazón

== History of Bolivia ==
- History of Bolivia
- Gregoria Apaza
- Atacama border dispute
- Hugo Banzer
- Bolivian Gas War
- Bolivian Independence War
- Bolivian Workers' Center
- 2004 Bolivian gas referendum
- Bolivian peso
- Bolivian scudo
- Simón Bolívar
- Military career of Simón Bolívar
- Catavi
- Real Audiencia of Charcas
- Cochabamba protests of 2000
- Operation Condor
- Confederación Sindical Única de Trabajadores Campesinos de Bolivia
- Congress of Tucumán
- Federación Sindical de Trabajadores Mineros de Bolivia
- Luis García Meza Tejada
- Guató people
- Revolutionary Nationalist Movement
- Ronald MacLean Abaroa
- Evo Morales
- Alfredo Ovando Candía
- Víctor Paz Estenssoro
- Republic of North Peru
- Republic of South Peru
- Peru-Bolivian Confederation
- Jorge Quiroga
- Manuel Rocha
- Eduardo Rodríguez
- Gonzalo Sánchez de Lozada
- José Mariano Serrano
- Siglo XX mine
- Simón Iturri Patiño
- Bartolina Sisa
- Tiwanaku
- Treaty of Petrópolis
- Tupac Katari
- Túpac Amaru

=== Members of the 1813 Assembly ===
- Pedro Ignacio de Castro Barros
- Juan José Paso
- Pedro Ignacio Rivera
- Cayetano José Rodríguez
- Antonio Sáenz
- José Mariano Serrano

=== Battles of Bolivia ===
- Battle of Topáter
- Battle of Yungay

==== Battles of the War of the Pacific ====
- Battle of Angamos
- Battle of Arica
- Battle of Chipana
- Battle of Huamachuco
- Battle of Iquique
- Battle of Punta Gruesa
- Battle of Pisagua
- Battle of San Francisco
- Battle of Tarapacá
- Battle of Topáter

==== Battles of the War of the Confederation ====
- Battle of Yungay

=== Members of the Congress of Tucumán ===
(no corresponde a Bolivia, sino an Argentina)

- Manuel Antonio Acevedo
- Tomás de Anchorena
- Pedro Miguel Aráoz
- Mariano Boedo
- José Antonio Cabrera
- Pedro Ignacio de Castro Barros
- José Colombres
- José Darragueira
- Pedro León Gallo
- Esteban Agustín Gazcón
- Tomás Godoy Cruz
- José Ignacio de Gorriti
- Francisco Narciso de Laprida
- José Severo Malabia
- Juan Agustín Maza
- Pedro Medrano
- José Andrés Pacheco de Melo
- Juan José Paso
- Eduardo Pérez Bulnes
- Pedro Ignacio Rivera
- Cayetano José Rodríguez
- Antonio Sáenz
- Gerónimo Salguero de Cabrera y Cabrera
- Teodoro Sánchez de Bustamante
- Mariano Sánchez de Loria
- Justo de Santa María de Oro
- José Mariano Serrano
- José Ignacio Thames
- Pedro Francisco de Uriarte

=== Elections in Bolivia ===
- Elections in Bolivia
- 2004 Bolivian gas referendum
- 2005 Bolivian legislative election
- 2005 Bolivian presidential election

=== Protests in Bolivia ===
- Bolivian Gas War
- Cochabamba protests of 2000

=== Wars of Bolivia ===
- War of the Confederation
- Chaco War
- War of the Pacific

==== War of the Pacific ====
- War of the Pacific
- Antofagasta Region
- Arica, Chile
- Atacama border dispute
- BAP Atahualpa
- Biblioteca Nacional del Perú
- Covadonga (ship)
- Ferrocarril de Antofagasta a Bolivia
- Huáscar (ship)
- BAP Manco Cápac
- Tacna
- Tacna-Arica compromise
- Tarapacá Region
- Toro Submarino
- Treaty of Ancón
- USS Lackawanna (1862)

===== War of the Pacific people =====
- Eduardo Abaroa
- Francisco Bolognesi
- Manuel Baquedano
- Alberto Blest Gana
- Mariano Bustamante
- Ladislao Cabrera
- Andrés Avelino Cáceres
- Narciso Campero
- Ignacio Carrera Pinto
- Melitón Carvajal
- Hilarión Daza
- Abel-Nicolas Bergasse du Petit-Thouars
- Erasmo Escala
- Miguel Grau Seminario
- Pedro Lagos
- Juan José Latorre
- Patricio Lynch
- Lizardo Montero Flores
- Nicolás de Piérola
- Aníbal Pinto
- Mariano Ignacio Prado
- Arturo Prat
- Roque Sáenz Peña
- Domingo Santa María
- Robert Souper
- Alfonso Ugarte
- Juan Williams Rebolledo

==== War of the Confederation ====
- War of the Confederation
- Republic of North Peru
- Republic of South Peru
- Peru-Bolivian Confederation

===== War of the Confederation people =====
- José Ballivián
- Manuel Blanco Encalada
- Manuel Bulnes
- Ramón Castilla
- Agustín Gamarra
- Luis José de Orbegoso
- Candelaria Perez
- Diego Portales
- José Joaquín Prieto
- José de la Riva Agüero
- Andrés de Santa Cruz
- Robert Winthrop Simpson

== Bolivian law ==
=== Law enforcement in Bolivia ===
- Law enforcement in Bolivia

== Bolivian media ==
- .bo Internet country code top-level domain for Bolivia
- List of Bolivian newspapers
- List of Bolivian magazines
- Media of Bolivia

=== Newspapers published in Bolivia ===
- List of Bolivian newspapers

=== Television stations in Bolivia ===
- List of Bolivian television channels
- Unitel Bolivia

== Military of Bolivia ==
- Military of Bolivia
- Bolivian Navy
- Juana Azurduy de Padilla

== Bolivian people ==
- Alfredo Da Silva
- Eduardo Abaroa
- Gregoria Apaza
- Luis Arce Gómez
- José Ballivián
- Carlos Quintanilla
- Desiree Durán Morales
- Eugenia Errázuriz
- Jaime Escalante
- Juana Azurduy de Padilla
- Bartolina Sisa
- Franz Tamayo
- Jorge Wilstermann

=== Bolivian people by occupation ===
==== Bolivian human rights activists ====
- Loyola Guzmán

==== Bolivian lawyers ====
- Esteban Agustín Gazcón
- José Severo Malabia
- Pedro Ignacio Rivera
- Mariano Sánchez de Loria
- José Mariano Serrano

==== Bolivian composers ====
- Jaime Mirtenbaum Zenamon
- Cergio Prudencio

=== People of Bolivian descent ===
==== Bolivian Americans ====
- Raquel Welch

==== Bolivian-Chileans ====
- Andrónico Luksic

== Politics of Bolivia ==
- Politics of Bolivia
- Apu Mallku
- Bolivian Gas War
- Foreign relations of Bolivia
- Liberalism in Bolivia
- Ronald MacLean Abaroa
- National Congress of Bolivia
- Qulla Suyu
- Vice President of Bolivia

=== Apu Mallku ===
- Apu Mallku
- Vicente Flores
- Antonio Machaca
- Max Paredes

=== Bolivian trade unionists ===
- Felipe Quispe

=== Political parties in Bolivia ===
- List of political parties in Bolivia
- Assembly of the Guarani People - North Charagua
- Bolivian Socialist Falange
- Christian Democratic Party (Bolivia)
- Civic Solidarity Union
- Communist Party (Marxist-Leninist) of Bolivia
- Communist Party of Bolivia
- Communist Party of Bolivia (Marxist-Leninist)
- Falange Neounzaguista
- Free Bolivia Movement
- Huanuni for All
- Indigenous Pachakuti Movement
- Movement for Socialism (Bolivia)
- National Unity Front
- Nationalist Democratic Action
- New Republican Force
- Regional Federation of Mining Cooperatives of Huanuni
- Revolutionary Left Movement (Bolivia)
- Revolutionary Left Party (Bolivia)
- Revolutionary Liberation Movement Tupaq Katari
- Revolutionary Nationalist Movement
- Revolutionary Party of the Nationalist Left
- Revolutionary Workers' Party (Bolivia)
- Social Unity Uprising of September First
- Social and Democratic Power
- Socialist Aymara Group
- Socialist Party (Bolivia)
- Unidad Democratica y Popular
- Unified Trade Union Sub Federation of Peasant Workers of Ancoraimes - Tupak Katari
- Without Fear Movement
- Yungas Cocalera Revolution

=== Bolivian politicians ===
- David Choquehuanca
- Víctor Hugo Cárdenas
- Eduardo Diez de Medina
- Federico Diez de Medina
- Samuel Jorge Doria Medina Auza
- Álvaro García Linera
- Adriana Gil
- Armando Loaiza
- Antonio Machaca
- Víctor Paz Estenssoro
- Felipe Quispe
- Casimira Rodriguez

==== Assassinated Bolivian politicians ====
- Manuel Isidoro Belzu
- Hilarión Daza
- Juan José Torres

== Bolivian society ==
- Asociación de Scouts de Bolivia
- CIDOB Confederation
- Demographics of Bolivia
- Public holidays in Bolivia

== Sport in Bolivia ==
=== Football in Bolivia ===
- Bolivia national football team
- Federación Boliviana de Fútbol
- Liga de Fútbol Profesional Boliviano

==== Bolivian football clubs ====
- Club Aurora
- Club Blooming
- Club Bolívar
- Club Universitario
- Club Destroyers
- Oriente Petrolero
- Club Bamin Real Potosí
- Club San José
- The Strongest
- Union Central (football club)
- Club Jorge Wilstermann

==== Bolivian footballers ====
- Carlos Borja (Bolivian footballer)
- Joaquín Botero
- Ramiro Castillo
- Luis Cristaldo
- Marco Etcheverry
- José Melgar
- Jaime Moreno
- Álvaro Peña
- Juan Manuel Peña
- Gustavo Quinteros
- Luis Ramallo
- Mauricio Ramos
- Miguel Rimba
- Erwin Sánchez
- Marco Sandy
- Víctor Ugarte
- Joselito Vaca
- Diego Hamada

=== Bolivia at the Olympics ===
- Bolivia at the 1936 Summer Olympics
- Bolivia at the 1964 Summer Olympics
- Bolivia at the 1968 Summer Olympics
- Bolivia at the 1972 Summer Olympics
- Bolivia at the 1976 Summer Olympics
- Bolivia at the 1984 Summer Olympics
- Bolivia at the 1988 Summer Olympics
- Bolivia at the 1992 Summer Olympics
- Bolivia at the 1996 Summer Olympics
- Bolivia at the 2000 Summer Olympics
- Bolivia at the 2004 Summer Olympics

=== Bolivian sportspeople ===
==== Bolivian football managers ====
- Gustavo Quinteros
- Erwin Sánchez

==== Olympic competitors for Bolivia ====
- Diego Camacho

==== Bolivian racecar drivers ====
===== Bolivian rally drivers =====
- William Bendeck

==== Bolivian tennis players ====
- Diego Camacho

== Transportation in Bolivia ==
- Transportation in Bolivia

=== Airlines of Bolivia ===
- List of airlines of Bolivia
- Aerosur
- TAM - Transporte Aéreo Militar

=== Roads in Bolivia ===
- Yungas Road

== Bolivia stubs ==
- Adolfo Ballivián
- Agustín Morales
- Alberto Natusch
- Alcides Arguedas
- Aniceto Arce
- Assembly of the Guarani People - North Charagua
- Ayllus
- Bartolina Sisa
- Battle of Pisagua
- Battle of San Francisco
- Battle of Topáter
- Bautista Saavedra
- Bolivia at the 1936 Summer Olympics
- Bolivia at the 1964 Summer Olympics
- Bolivia at the 1968 Summer Olympics
- Bolivia at the 1972 Summer Olympics
- Bolivia at the 1976 Summer Olympics
- Bolivia at the 1984 Summer Olympics
- Bolivia at the 1988 Summer Olympics
- Bolivia at the 1992 Summer Olympics
- Bolivia at the 1996 Summer Olympics
- Bolivia at the 2000 Summer Olympics
- Bolivian Workers' Center
- Camiri
- Carlos Blanco Galindo
- Carlos Borja (Bolivian footballer)
- Carlos Quintanilla
- Celso Torrelio
- Charcas (Audiencia)
- Christian Democratic Party (Bolivia)
- Civic Solidarity Union
- Cocalero
- Cochabamba Cooperative School
- Communist Party (Marxist-Leninist) of Bolivia
- Confederación Sindical Única de Trabajadores Campesinos de Bolivia
- David Padilla
- David Toro
- Desiree Durán Morales
- Eduardo Abaroa
- Eduardo Rodríguez
- Ekeko
- El Diario
- Eliodoro Camacho
- Eliodoro Villazón
- Enrique Hertzog
- Enrique Peñaranda
- Erwin Sánchez
- Estadio Félix Capriles
- Estadio Hernando Siles
- Estadio IV Centenário
- Estadio Jesús Bermúdez
- Estadio Libertador Simón Bolivar
- Estadio Mario Mercado Vaca Guzmán
- Estadio Olímpico Patria
- Estadio Rafael Mendoza
- Estadio Ramón Tahuichi Aguilera
- Falange Neounzaguista
- Felipe Segundo Guzmán
- Franz Tamayo
- Free Bolivia Movement
- Germán Busch
- Gregoria Apaza
- Gregorio Pacheco
- Guido Vildoso
- Guillermo Lora
- Gustavo Quinteros
- Hernando Siles Reyes
- Hilarión Daza
- Huanuni for All
- Hugo Ballivián
- Indigenous Pachakuti Movement
- Islam in Bolivia
- Ismael Montes
- Jorge Córdova
- Jorge Quiroga
- José Ballivián
- José Gutiérrez Guerra
- José Manuel Pando
- José María Achá
- José María Linares
- José Melgar
- Juan Manuel Peña
- Khanata
- Lidia Gueiler Tejada
- Luis Adolfo Siles Salinas
- Luis Arce Gómez
- Luis Cristaldo
- Luis García Meza Tejada
- Luis Ramallo
- Mamerto Urriolagoitia
- Manuel Isidoro Belzu
- Marcelo Quiroga Santa Cruz
- Marco Sandy
- Mariano Baptista
- Mariano Melgarejo
- Matilde Casazola
- Mauricio Ramos
- Miguel Rimba
- Movement for Socialism (Bolivia)
- Narciso Campero
- National Unity Front
- Nationalist Democratic Action
- New Republican Force
- Northeast Bolivian Airways
- Néstor Guillén
- Pedro Shimose
- Ramiro Castillo
- Regional Federation of Mining Cooperatives of Huanuni
- Revolutionary Left Movement (Bolivia)
- Revolutionary Liberation Movement Tupaq Katari
- Samuel Jorge Doria Medina Auza
- San Agustin High School
- Severo Fernández
- Social Unity Uprising of September First
- Social and Democratic Power
- Socialist Aymara Group
- Socialist Party (Bolivia)
- TAM - Transporte Aéreo Militar
- Template:Bolivia-stub
- The Women's Development Bank
- Toba (tribe)
- Tomás Frías Ametller
- Tomás Monje
- Unidad Democratica y Popular
- Unified Trade Union Sub Federation of Peasant Workers of Ancoraimes - Tupak Katari
- Unitel Bolivia
- Universidad Adventista de Bolivia
- Víctor Hugo Cárdenas
- Víctor Ugarte
- Without Fear Movement
- Wálter Guevara
- YPFB
- Yungas Cocalera Revolution
- Álvaro García Linera
- Álvaro Peña

== Other ==
- Hiking in Bolivia
- Communications in Bolivia
- Economic history of Bolivia
- Education in Bolivia
- Elections in Bolivia
- Foreign relations of Bolivia
- Human rights in Bolivia
- ISO 3166-2:BO
- Law of Bolivia
- List of Bolivia companies
- List of Bolivian television channels
- List of Bolivians
- Transport in Bolivia
- United Nations
- Water supply and sanitation in Bolivia

== See also ==
- Index of Bolivia-related articles
- List of international rankings
- Lists of country-related topics
- Outline of geography
- Outline of South America
- United Nations
