= Pedro Rivera =

Pedro Rivera may refer to:

- Pedro N. Rivera (born 1945), retired U.S. Air Force officer
- Pedro Rivera (footballer) (born 1976), Chilean footballer
- Pedro Ignacio Rivera (1759–1833), Bolivian-born statesman and lawyer
- Pedro Rivera (educator), former Pennsylvania Secretary of Education
