= Puerto Busch =

River port in Santa Cruz, Bolivia

- River port
- Interactive map of Puerto Busch
- Location within Bolivia
- Coordinates: 20°4′22″S 58°2′21″W
- Country: Bolivia
- Department: Santa Cruz
- Province: Germán Busch
- Time zone: UTC-4 (BOT)

Puerto Busch is an inland port on the Paraguay River, in Germán Busch Province, Santa Cruz Department, southeastern Bolivia. It is located in the Dionisio Foianini Triangle, a strategic border area awarded to Bolivia by Brazil in the 1903 Treaty of Petrópolis that ended the Acre War. Puerto Busch was founded in 1952 by Bolivian Army officer Manuel Aguirre Quiroga, who named the port after Germán Busch, the 36th president of Bolivia. It is sparsely populated by indigenous Chiquitano and Ayoreo residents.

== Geography ==
Puerto Busch is located in the Dionisio Foianini Triangle, a triangular border area along the Paraguay River that Brazil awarded to Bolivia following their signing of the Treaty of Petrópolis on 17 November 1903, which ended the Acre War between the two. Puerto Busch's location in the triangle is of strategic and commercial importance to Bolivia because it provides Bolivia access to the Atlantic Ocean via the Paraguay River. While ships departing from other Bolivian ports such as Puerto Suárez, Puerto Aguirre, and Puerto Quijarro must pass through Brazil via the Tamengo Canal to reach the Paraguay River, Puerto Busch has direct access.

== History ==
Bolivian Army officer Manuel Aguirre Quiroga founded Puerto Busch on 12 November 1952 after expelling illegal Brazilian and Paraguayan settlers from the area. He ordered the construction of cabins on the riverbank to establish Bolivia's sovereignty, and named the new settlement after Germán Busch, a Bolivian general who fought in the Chaco War (1932–1935) and later served as the 36th president of Bolivia from 1937 to 1939. A military engineer and topographer, Aguirre personally conducted topographic surveys and led efforts to artificially elevate the land to allow the establishment of a port.

== Demographics ==
Situated deep within the Pantanal region of the Amazon rainforest, Puerto Busch's population comprises less than 100 residents, who are mostly indigenous Chiquitano and Ayoreo people.

== Economy ==
The Bolivian state-owned Empresa Siderúrgica del Mutún mining company exports ore from the El Mutún mine through Puerto Busch. However, shipments are diverted to Puerto Aguirre when Puerto Busch floods periodically due to seasonal rains.

Since the late 2010s, there have been plans by the Bolivian government to expand operations in Puerto Busch and its connections to other ports in the Amazon and Atlantic coast.

== Transport ==
Aside from traversing the Paraguay River, Puerto Busch can be reached by driving along a 140-kilometre road from Puerto Suárez.
