= St Augustine College, Cochabamba =

St Augustine College
- Spanish: Colegio San Agustín
- 1359 América Ave. Cochabamba, Cochabamba; Bolivia

Information
- Type: Private secondary school
- Religious affiliation: Catholicism
- Patron saint: Augustine of Hippo
- Established: 21 October 1954; 71 years ago
- Principal: Lic. René Cardozo (2015–present)
- Enrollment: 942 (July 2017)
- Campus: Urban
- Colors: Red and blue
- Website: www.sanagustin.edu.bo

St Augustine College (Spanish: Colegio San Agustín) is a private Catholic secondary school, located in Cochabamba, Bolivia.

== Overview ==
Augustinians settled in Cochabamba in the 1950s to contribute to the education in Bolivia. They founded the high school in 1954 and it started its activities in 1955. Since its inception, St Augustine College has focused on providing a strong technical background to its students. Most of them have obtained a degree in engineering or sciences, as critical thinking has been mainly promoted among its students. There have been students who obtained higher education and professional recognition in the social sciences as well. This high school is regarded as Bolivia's 1st ranked high school due to the performance of its students in science contests as well as the performance shown by its graduates in both the public and the private sectors within Bolivia and abroad. 2005 marked the school's 50th anniversary. On that occasion, it was awarded the Order of the Condor of the Andes, which is the Bolivian government's highest distinction, and also it was the first women promotion. In 2016, the school began the first Bolivian technologic school project. It included a project to obtain the ISO 9001 academic quality management system for education and will last until 2020.

This college has been managed by the San Agustin Educational Foundation (Fundación Educacional San Agustín (FESA)) since 28 August 1992. Previously, it was managed by the Augustinians in the name of the same school. Nicolas Beumer, the last Augustinian who participated in this educational endeavour, died in 2015.

== History ==
The Order of Saint Augustine was founded in 1244. The first Augustinians arrived in Bolivia in the 16th century. In December 1949, the Order of Saint Augustine was established in Cochabamba by the Augustinians from The Netherlands. On 25 July 1951, they received a permit, given by the local ecclesiastical authorities, to found an Industrial School, a Convent, and a church. In the same year, they acquire about 4 hectares of land to build their projects. The college is still in the original location: Tupuraya, which was at that time on the outskirts of the city of Cochabamba.

In 1949, the provincial chapter in Holland sent Frs. Marcos Meyer (Meijer) and Andres Van Meegeren to Cochabamba to prepare the foundation of the school, whereas three young fathers were sent to Villanova University to obtain engineering degrees (amongst them William Saelman who spent 4 years in the United States before moving to Cochabamba), later on some more young priests were sent to Villanova University for the same purpose.

Four Augustinians arrived in Cochabamba on the 27 of February 1952: Enrique Ebbing, Jaime Van Maanen, Nicolás Beumer and Germán de Beer, who were accompanied by a priest, Juan Teuben, who was in charge of the convent of augustinians in La Paz, Bolivia. They have set the foundational aspects of the college.

On 21 October 1954, a decree (number 64314) was issued authorising the college operations. The first student was enrolled on the 22 of December 1954 for the first level of secondary school.

In 1955, the first academic year started under the supervision of Mr. Teuben (principal until December 1958). 25 students and their families gathered on Friday 4 February 1955 in a mass in the convent's chapel. On Monday 7 February, the Bolivian teacher Guillermo Rodrigo Mercado inaugurated the academic activities with the first class about 'Bolivian Geography'.

Most of the first teachers were Dutch although there were Bolivians too:

- Raimundo Grigoriú (Bolivian), Civics
- Antonio Cabrerizo (Bolivian), Literature
- Julio Foronda (Bolivian), Gymnastics
- Pedro Diepstraten (Priest, Dutch)
- Edmundo (Gerrit) Hamerlinck (Priest, Dutch) - died in La Paz in 1979 (56 years old)
- Liborio Groen (Priest, Dutch)
- Andrés van Meegeren (Priest, Dutch)
- Juan Pedro Smeters (Priest, Dutch)
- Jaime (Joannes Jacobus) Van Maanen (Priest, Dutch) - born in Haarlem (7 Feb 1926)
- Nicolás Beumer (Priest, Dutch) - religion teacher
- Juan Swinkels (Brother, Dutch)
- Armando Thyssen (Brother, Dutch)
- Emmy Amesz-Holstege (Brother, Dutch) Chemistry

The first physics and chemistry labs started in 1957. At that time, the college had 145 registered students (divided in 5 groups), 6 Augustinian priests, a Bolivian full-time teacher as well as other 5 Bolivian teachers working part-time. The schedule ran from 8 A.M. until 3 P.M.

The priest Guillermo Saelman was the college's principal from 1957 until 1962. On 26 November 1960, 14 students completed their 6-year secondary education in the college—there were 221 students registered in the college on that year who were in 9 different groups/classes.

On 29 August 1961, the first issue of “La Kantuta”, a college newspaper completely edited by the students, was published (The Kantuta, a.k.a. qantuta, is one of Bolivia's national flowers). Later on, a debate club (“Casiciaco”) is started in remembrance to the finca, located in the north of Italy, where between 386 and 387 A.D., Saint Augustine — the founder of the order — used to study and reflect.

In 1963, the priest Lucas Hoogveld became principal.

In 1991, the college starts an important transition of its administration towards the a newly created foundation ("Fundación Educacional San Agustin", FESA). FESA assumes the management of the college on the 28 of August 1992.

In 1998, 206 new potential students applied for becoming students in the college—50 women thereof. Out of all the applicants, 60 male students and 30 females students were admitted, these girls were the first ones in the history of the college.

In 2004, the first 13 female students accomplished their secondary studies (along with 35 male students).

In 2005, the college celebrated 50 years of successful educational activities. Up to that year, 1620 students completed their secondary education, 95% of them pursued higher education studies. On the same year, the college was awarded with the Order of the Condor of the Andes—a few days after the condecoration, Jaime Van Maanem, who was present in the award ceremony, passed away.

== Principals ==
- Juan Teuben: Feb 1955 - Dec 1958
- J. Guillermo (William) Saelman: Feb 1959 - Dec 1964
- Lucas Hoogveld: Feb 1965 - Dec 1971
- Antonio Cabrerizo: Feb 1972 - Dec 1987
- Beatriz Escalera Vásquez: Feb 1988 - Dec 1998
- Jorge Escalera Vásquez: 1999 - 2004
- Gustavo Deheza Ugarte: 2004 - 2008
- Jorge Escalera Vásquez: 2009 - 2012
- Juan Carlos Rodriguez: 2013 - 2014
- Rene Cardozo: Feb 2015 - today

== Notable alumni ==
- Álvaro García Linera: Vice President of Bolivia (2006–2019)
- Eduardo Rodríguez Veltzé: lawyer and former president of Bolivia (2005)
- Roberto Laserna: economist
- Sergio Óliver Rodríguez Mercado (known as "Vikingo"): politician
- Marco Sandy: football manager, former professional football player

== See also ==
- Catholic Church in Bolivia
- Education in Bolivia
