= Assembly of the Year XIII =

1813 political congress in Argentina

Assembly of Year XIII Asamblea del Año XIII
- United Provinces of the Río de la Plata
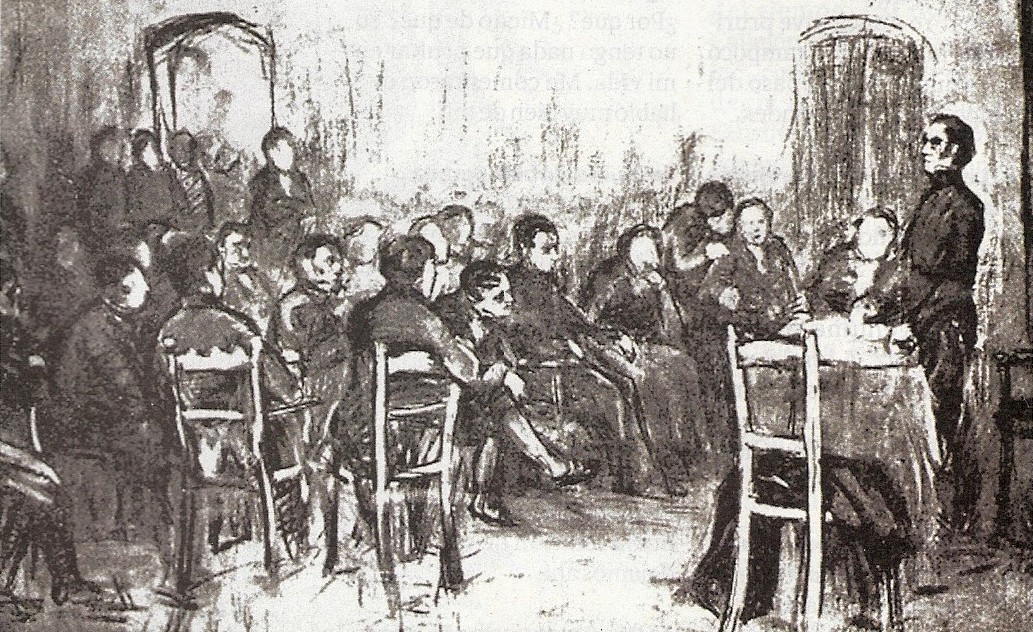
- Meeting of the Assembly.

Type
- Type: Unicameral

History
- Established: 1813
- Disbanded: 1815
- Succeeded by: Congress of Tucumán

Seal of the Assembly

Territories represented at the Assembly

The Assembly of the Year XIII, (Spanish: Asamblea del Año XIII) also known as the General Constituent and Sovereign Assembly of the Year 1813 (Asamblea General Constituyente y Soberana del Año 1813), was a congress of deputies of the United Provinces of the Río de la Plata convened by the Second Triumvirate, which met in Buenos Aires from 31 January 1813 to 24 January 1815. Its objectives were for the representatives of the "free peoples" to recognise the sovereignty of the people, proclaim the independence of the United Provinces and draft a constitution that would define the institutional system of the new state. Although these last two objectives were not met, the assembly established a significant number of reforms in the Rioplatense institutions and among other measures established the celebration of 25 May as a civic holiday, remove the image of Ferdinand VII from coins and official documents, declared the principle of the sovereignty of the people, commissioned the composition of a national anthem, dictated the abolition of slavery, removed nobility titles, and proclaimed freedom of the press among other things.

== History ==
=== Formation ===
In order to constitute the Assembly of the Year XIII, the Second Triumvirate quickly decreed on 24 October 1812 the number of deputies that would correspond, according to their importance, to the capital —Buenos Aires—, to the capitals of each province or intendancy, and to each dependent city, with the exception of San Miguel de Tucumán, which elected two deputies as a reward for the recent victory over the royalist army.

Article 6. This Capital shall have four Deputies due to its greater population and political importance; the other Provincial Capitals shall appoint two, and one for each city under their jurisdiction, except for Tucumán, which may at its discretion attend the Assembly with two Deputies.
Decree calling elections (trans-title=Decree calling elections for the Assembly of the Year XIII)

In compliance with the decree of the triumvirs, the following deputies were elected in the territory of the Provinces of the Río de la Plata:

- For Buenos Aires: Hipólito Vieytes, Valentín Gómez, Vicente López y Planes and José Julián Pérez (upon joining the Triumvirate he was replaced on 27 February 1813 by Manuel de Luzuriaga);
- For Salta: Pedro Agrelo and José Moldes;
- For Córdoba: Juan Larrea (upon being elected triumvir on 5 November 1813, he was replaced by José Gregorio Baigorrí, who joined on 25 August 1814, resigning on 14 January 1815) and Gervasio Posadas (upon being elected triumvir on 19 August 1813, Miguel Calixto del Corro was appointed, but his credentials were not accepted and Agustín Pío de Elía was appointed, joining on 21 January 1814);
- For Corrientes: Carlos de Alvear (resigned on 4 June 1813 and was replaced by Francisco Ortiz, who joined on 18 August 1813);
- For San Juan: Tomás Antonio Valle;
- For Mendoza: Bernardo de Monteagudo;
- For Santiago del Estero: Mariano Perdriel;
- For Catamarca: José Fermín Sarmiento;
- For La Rioja: José Francisco Ugarteche;
- For Tucumán: Nicolás Laguna (joined on 23 February 1813) and Juan Ramón Balcarce;
- For San Luis: Agustín José Donado;
- For Jujuy: Pedro Pablo Vidal;
- For Entre Ríos: Ramón Eduardo de Anchoris (joined on 22 April 1813);
- For Santa Fe: José Ignacio de Amenábar (joined on 22 February 1813);
- For Luján: Francisco Javier Argerich.
- For Chuquisaca: José Mariano Serrano and Ángel Mariano Toro (elected on 12 July 1813 and joined on 25 August 1814);
- For Potosí: Simón Diez de Ramila and Gregorio Ferreira (elected on 12 July 1813 and joined on 25 August 1814);
- For Mizque: Pedro Ignacio Rivera (joined on 15 October 1813).
- For Montevideo: Pedro Fabián Pérez and Pedro Feliciano Cavia (elected on 19 October 1814, joined on 5 January 1815)
- For Maldonado: Dámaso Gómez Fonseca (joined on 9 April 1813)

The deputies representing the provinces of Upper Peru were elected under the protection of the Auxiliary Army and the republiquetas. On 29 July 1813, a peremptory circular was sent to the governors-intendant of Potosí and Cochabamba, the president of Charcas, and the lieutenant governors of Santa Cruz de la Sierra and Tarija to accelerate the election of deputies, ordering General Manuel Belgrano to enforce it.

They failed to join the assembly:

- For Santa Cruz de la Sierra: Antonio Suárez and Cosme Damián Urtubey (elected on 26 September 1813);
- For Cochabamba: José Miguel de Cabrera and Andrés Pardo de Figueroa (elected on 2 September 1813).

=== Rejection of the Oriental deputies ===
Territories of the United Provinces that elected deputies to the Assembly of the Year XIII.

On 5 March 1813, the Assembly suspended the incorporation of the deputies from the Banda Oriental, elected on 21 April 1813 at the "Congress of Tres Cruces" under the leadership of José Gervasio Artigas, expressing doubts about the lack of formal procedure in the election. Only two deputies had been elected by the cabildos as ordered; the rest were chosen by the provincial congress meeting in Tres Cruces. Traditional Uruguayan historiography considers that the reason was the refusal to incorporate deputies arriving with the instructions proposed by Artigas, aimed at immediately declaring independence from the Kingdom of Spain and organizing the provinces under a confederal state, which broke with the existing centralization. The six Oriental deputies corresponded to the six cabildos of the province:

- For Montevideo: Dámaso Larrañaga (replaced by Tomás García de Zúñiga) and Mateo Vidal;
- For Maldonado: Dámaso Gómez Fonseca;
- For Canelones: Felipe Cardoso;
- For San Juan Bautista (present-day Santa Lucía) and San José: Marco Salcedo;
- For Santo Domingo Soriano: Francisco Bruno de Rivarola.

The Assembly sent deputy Pedro Pablo Vidal to negotiate with Artigas, but no agreement was reached, and in the session of 1 June 1813, confirmed on the 11th of the same month after a request for review, most of the Oriental deputies were rejected. Exempted from this measure were the two deputies elected according to the prescribed method before the Congress of Tres Cruces: that of Maldonado, Dámaso Gómez Fonseca —resident in Buenos Aires— and that of Montevideo, Dámaso Larrañaga. However, only the former joined, as the latter did not travel to Buenos Aires and instead extended powers to his replacement, Artigas' envoy Tomás García de Zúñiga, who in turn withdrew the request for incorporation.

=== Periods ===
The first period of the Assembly of the Year XIII, beginning on 31 January 1813, ended on 8 September 1813, totaling 84 sessions. The second period, from 1 October 1813 to 18 November 1813, totaled 10 sessions. The third period, from 21 January 1814 to 8 February 1814, totaled 7 sessions. The fourth period was extraordinary and an extension of the third, totaling 5 sessions from 25 August to 31 August 1814. The fifth period was also an extension of the third and had 5 sessions from 5 January to 26 January 1815.

=== Inaugural session ===
The inaugural session of the Assembly, on 31 January 1813, declared that its deputies were representatives of the provinces that declared themselves free and united of the Río de la Plata; that it held the representation of the sovereignty of the people; that its purpose was to draft a constitution; and it elected its president and secretaries.

The Triumvirate decreed that day:

The Provisional Supreme Executive Power of the United Provinces of the Río de la Plata; to those who see, hear, or understand this, know:
That with the meeting of the majority of the Deputies of the free Provinces of the Río de la Plata in the capital of Buenos Aires, and the installation today of the General Constituent Assembly, the following articles have been decreed:
Art. 1.— That in it resides the representation and exercise of the sovereignty of the United Provinces of the Río de la Plata, and that it be addressed as Sovereign Lord, its individual members retaining the simple form of address.
Art. 2.— That its President be the Deputy of the city of Corrientes, Mr. Carlos Alvear.
Art. 3.— That its secretaries be the Deputies of Buenos Aires, Mr. Valentín Gómez and Mr. Hipólito Vieytes.
(...)
Art. 5.— That the Executive Power remain temporarily delegated to the same persons who administer it, with the character of Supreme, until otherwise determined.
(...)
Decree of installation and organization of the Assembly

=== Evolution ===
At the beginning of 1814, the Assembly took a further step toward concentrating power in the executive by creating the Directory, a single-person executive office held by the Supreme Director of the United Provinces of the Río de la Plata, electing one of the newest members of the Third Triumvirate, Gervasio Antonio de Posadas, who governed with little consultation with the Assembly.

=== Secretaries ===
The two deputy secretaries of the Assembly of the Year XIII were appointed by the Triumvirate on 31 January 1813: Valentín Gómez and Hipólito Vieytes. When Gómez resigned on 26 October 1813 he was replaced by Vicente López y Planes.

=== Main provisions of the assembly ===
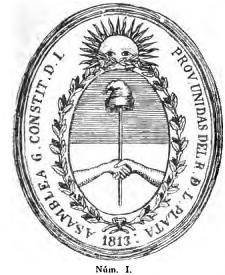
Seal of the Assembly of the Year XIII.

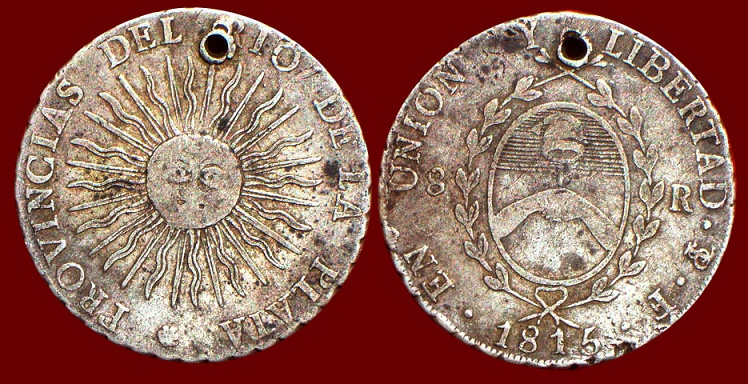
Argentine coin minted at the Potosí Mint, 1815.

During the assembly, different interests delayed the declaration of independence, but a number of common points were successfully established:

- The creation of the national currency was ordered: it ordered the minting of the first national coin in gold and silver at the Potosí Mint.
- Abolished the personal service of the Indians: the encomienda, the mit'a, and the yanaconazgo.
- Regarding slavery, the deputies promoting its abolition announced that their first measure would be the liberation of all slaves in the national territory. The freedom of wombs law (Libertad de vientres), which ultimately put an end to slavery, was passed, dictating that children born from slaves since the passing of the law were automatically free citizens.
- The national coat of arms was chosen.
- The national anthem was adopted, including the lines, "O hear the sounds of broken chains! / See noble equality enthroned!"
- All titles of nobility (from the colonial period) were voided and suppressed.
- The Spanish Inquisition and the practice of torture were abolished.
- A statute was approved that replaced as Executive Power the Second Triumvirate for a unipersonal Supreme Directorship.

=== Final session and the Fontezuelas mutiny ===
At the final session of the Assembly of the Year XIII, held on 26 January 1815, the following deputies were present: Nicolás Laguna (President, deputy for Tucumán), Pedro Ignacio Rivera (Vice President, deputy for Mizque), Valentín Gómez (Buenos Aires), Tomás Antonio Valle (San Juan), Francisco Ortiz (Corrientes), Ramón Eduardo Anchoris (Entre Ríos), Francisco Javier Argerich (Luján), Pedro Fabián Pérez (Montevideo), Bernardo Monteagudo (Mendoza), José Fermín Sarmiento (Catamarca), Pedro Feliciano de Cavia (Montevideo), Mariano Perdriel (Santiago del Estero), Agustín José Donado (San Luis), Manuel de Luzuriaga (Buenos Aires), José Amenábar (Santa Fe), Hipólito Vieytes (secretary, Buenos Aires), Vicente López y Planes (secretary, Buenos Aires).

From then on, and for the rest of the central unitarian government of the Directory under Carlos María de Alvear, the Assembly did not meet again. It was officially dissolved as a result of the coup of 18 April 1815 known as the "Revolution of the Fontezuelas" (as it occurred at the Fontezuela post, near present-day Pergamino), led by military forces sent by the Buenos Aires government to repress the interior and especially its main enemy José Gervasio Artigas (leader of the League of the Free Peoples controlling the Banda Oriental, Entre Ríos, Santa Fe, Corrientes and part of Córdoba), under Colonel Ignacio Álvarez Thomas. The coup was accompanied and reinforced by a popular uprising in the streets of Buenos Aires. Álvarez Thomas had agreed with Artigas' representatives on a non-aggression understanding. Street mobilization re-emerged in the political arena.

== Present day ==
To commemorate the bicentenary of the Assembly of the Year XIII, a national holiday was decreed in Argentina, for one time only, on Thursday, 31 January 2013.

== See also ==
- Argentine War of Independence
- Instructions of the Year XIII
- United Provinces of the Río de la Plata
