= Arroyo Concepción =

Coordinates: 19.0225°S 57.7097°W

- Town
- Interactive map of Arroyo Concepción
- Country: Bolivia
- Elevation: 344 ft (105 m)
- Time zone: UTC-4 (BOT)
- Climate: Aw

Arroyo Concepción is a town in Bolivia. In 2010 it had an estimated population of 5060.

== Location ==
Arroyo Concepción is the second largest town in the County (Municipio) Puerto Quijarro in Germán Busch Province. Puerto Quijarro is located to the south. Arroyo Concepción lies at an altitude of 105 m. It is located southeast of Laguna Cáceres on the Rio Paraguay. On the south-eastern outskirts of Arroyo Concepción is the border crossing, which links Puerto Suárez and Puerto Quijarro with the city of Corumbá on the Brazilian side.

== Geography ==
Arroyo Concepción is located in the Bolivian portion of the Pantanal, one of the largest inland wetlands on Earth. The mean average temperature of the region is around 26 °C [2] and varies only slightly between 22-23 °C in June and July and 28-29 °C from October to February. The annual rainfall is just over 1000 mm, with a short dry season in June and August with monthly rainfall below 30 mm.
