= Malabia =

Malabia may refer to:

- José Severo Malabia (1787 - 1849), a Bolivian-born statesman and lawyer
- Malabia (Buenos Aires Metro), a station on line B of the Buenos Aires metro
