= Thaddeus Stevens College of Technology =

Technical college in Lancaster, Pennsylvania, U.S.

Coordinates: 40.0376°N 76.2890°W

- Motto: Prepare for work. Prepare for life.
- Type: Public technical college
- Established: 1905
- President: Pedro Rivera
- Undergraduates: 1,453
- Location: Lancaster, Pennsylvania, United States
- Campus: Urban
- Colors: Maroon and Steel
- Nickname: Bulldogs
- Mascot: Bulldog
- Website: www.stevenscollege.edu

Thaddeus Stevens College of Technology is a public technical college in Lancaster, Pennsylvania, United States. It offers 26 academic programs for about 1,400 students. It was named for Thaddeus Stevens, a nineteenth-century statesman. The college was founded in 1905 as "Stevens Trade School" and is accredited by the Middle States Commission on Higher Education.

== Campus ==
The campus consists of nineteen buildings on 32.5 acres (132,000 m^{2}) of land on its Main Campus. These include five residence halls, a dining hall, a college store, administrative buildings, a Memorial Garden, a gym, and technical labs for nine academic majors. The Learning Resources Center was completed in the summer of 1995.

In April 2019, the school opened the Greiner Campus, a 60,000 square-foot facility dedicated to advanced manufacturing programs, and houses three academic major technical labs. The Transportation Center, opened in 2021, houses three automotive-focused technical labs as well as classrooms and student use areas. The College also hosts programs in a building in the Greenfield Corporate Center, on Colonial Village Lane, housing three major construction-focused programs. Its Griscom Education Center on East Orange Street in Lancaster houses students in three floors of residence halls, has a health center and cafe, and includes lab space for eight of its technical academic majors.

== Leadership ==
On August 4, 2020, Thaddeus Stevens College announced that Pedro Rivera would become the 10th president of the college. Rivera, who previously served as Pennsylvania Secretary of Education and superintendent of the School District of Lancaster, officially started October 1, 2020.

== Rankings ==
Thaddeus Stevens College was ranked 9th among "Top Two-Year Trade Schools" by Forbes in their 2018 rankings.

== Athletics ==
Thaddeus Stevens is a member of the National Junior College Athletic Association, participating in Division III sports. It competes in basketball, cross country, football (not part of NJCAA), track and field, and wrestling.
