= Max Paredes =

Max Paredes was an ethnic Aymara Apu Mallku of Qullana Suyu Marka (Greater Collasuyu) between 2000 and 2003. He had been a Mallku representing the Aymara community of part of Bolivia before he was chosen as the next Apu Mallku. In 2002 he was forced to defend his position amid various slurs that he was in league with the government of Bolivia. He was replaced in 2003 by Vicente Flores.
