= José Moldes =

Argentine military leader (1785–1824)

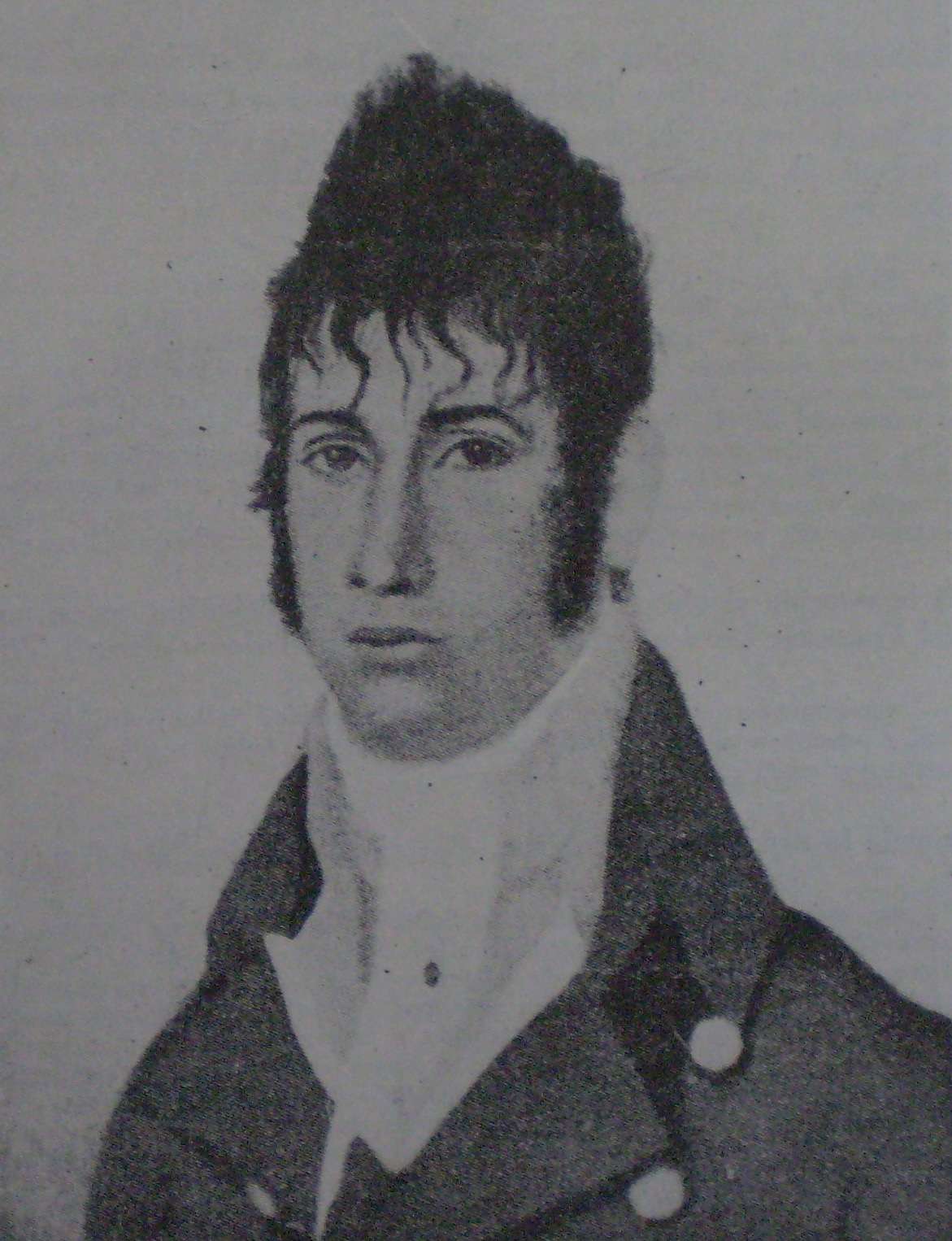
José Moldes

José Moldes (January 1, 1785 - April 18, 1824) was an Argentine military leader. He was born in the Salta Province, and moved to Spain in his infancy. His father was Antonio Moldes y González, from Barro (Barro is a municipality in Galicia, Spain in the province of Pontevedra). He served in the Spanish army, and joined lodges in Cádiz opposed to the absolutist monarchy. He left Spain and moved to Buenos Aires, supporting the faction of Mariano Moreno after the May Revolution. He was exiled by the 1811 coup, but returned to the Assembly of the Year XIII. He was proposed in 1816 as a possible Supreme Director of the United Provinces of the Río de la Plata by deputies of the Congress of Tucumán, but José de San Martín feared that his strong feud with Buenos Aires may break national unity, and opposed his candidacy.

== Bibliography ==
- Galasso, Norberto (2000). Seamos libres y lo demás no importa nada [Let us be free and nothing else matters] (in Spanish). Buenos Aires: Colihue. ISBN 978-950-581-779-5.
