= Pedro Rivera (educator) =

Pennsylvania Secretary of Education

Pedro A. Rivera
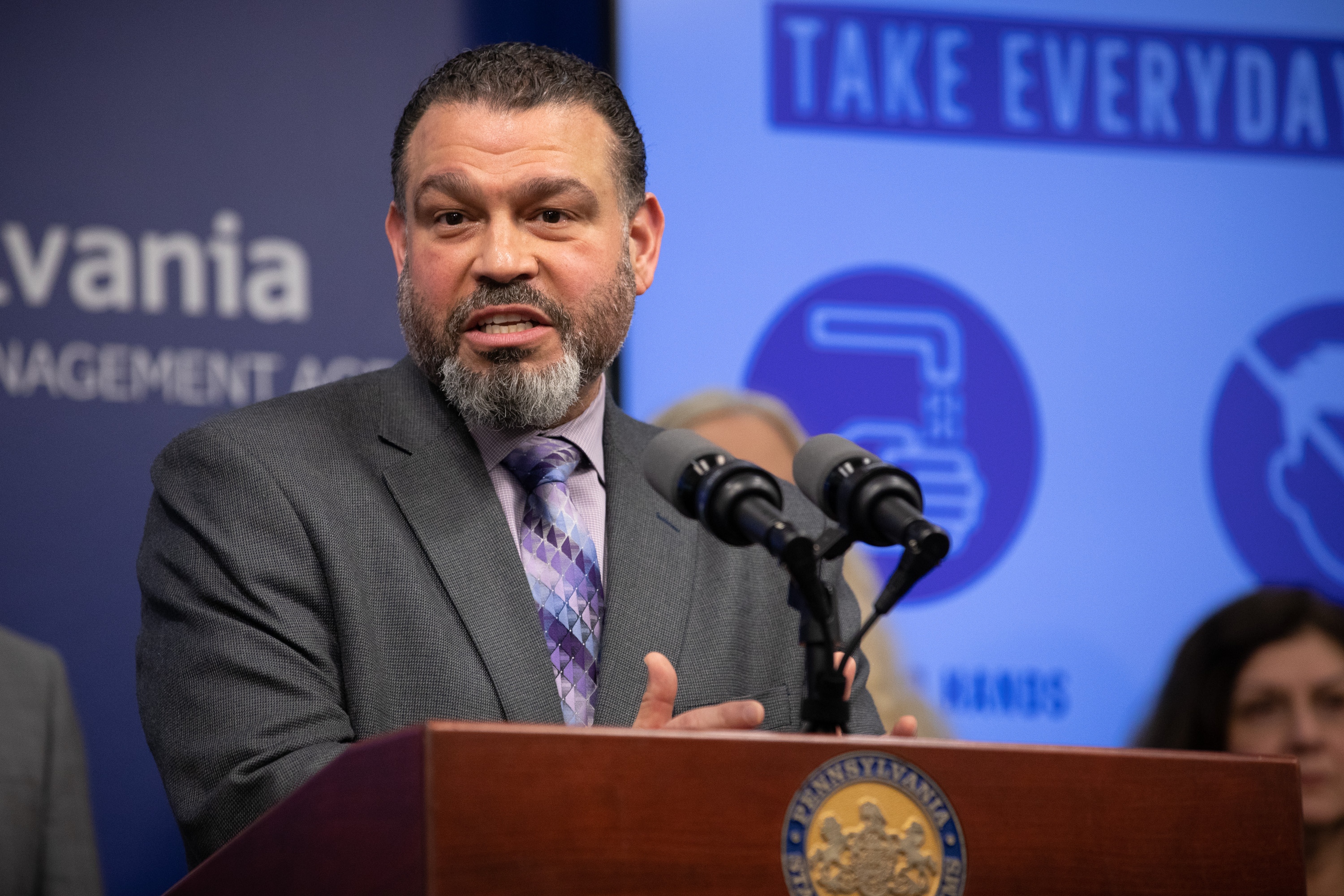
- Pedro Rivera, speaking at a COVID-19 response press conference, on March 13, 2020

President of Thaddeus Stevens College of Technology
- Incumbent
- Assumed office October 1, 2020
- Preceded by: William E. Griscom

Secretary of Education of Pennsylvania
- In office June 3, 2015 – October 1, 2020
- Preceded by: Carolyn C. Dumaresq
- Succeeded by: Noe Ortega

Personal details
- Education: B.A. from Pennsylvania State University; M.A. from Cheyney University of Pennsylvania; Ed.D. from The University of Pennsylvania
- Occupation: Educator

Pedro A. Rivera is the former Pennsylvania Secretary of Education, having been nominated by Pennsylvania Governor Tom Wolf and confirmed in June 2015. Previously, he served as superintendent of the School District of Lancaster. Starting October 1, 2020, he began a new role as President of Thaddeus Stevens College of Technology. A Philadelphia native, Rivera spent 13 years at the School District of Philadelphia before accepting the Lancaster position in 2008. During his tenure, Lancaster saw improved graduation rates, better reading proficiency scores and a growth in financial reserve funds. Rivera has been recognized by The Washington Post and the White House for his academic achievements.

== Early life and career ==
Pedro A. Rivera was born in Philadelphia, growing up in the Hunting Park section of the city. His grandmother came to Philadelphia from Puerto Rico to take a job in a sewing factory. Rivera received a bachelor's degree in education from Pennsylvania State University, a master's degree in education administration from Cheyney University of Pennsylvania, a superintendent letter of eligibility from Arcadia University and a doctorate degree in education from the University of Pennsylvania. He spent 13 years working in the School District of Philadelphia, holding principal positions from August 2001 to July 2006, including principal of Sheridan Elementary School and assistant principal of Kensington High School. Rivera also held the positions of bilingual teacher, coordinator of English as a second language programs, and executive director of high schools, and finished his time there as director of the human resources department. He also served as president of the Philadelphia Association of Hispanic School Administrators.

== Career ==
In November 2020, Rivera was named a volunteer member of the Joe Biden presidential transition Agency Review Team to support transition efforts related to the United States Department of Education.

=== Lancaster superintendent ===
On April 16, 2008, Rivera was appointed superintendent of the School District of Lancaster, which includes about 11,500 students. He was chosen by a 5–4 vote from the Lancaster School Board after a meeting that drew a great deal of heated public testimony, including racial overtones. The decision was described by Lancaster Online as "one of the most divisive in the district's recent history". Rivera was the district's sixth superintendent in 10 years, and at the time he started Lancaster was facing four multimillion-dollar building renovations, maintenance issues, low test scores and recent instability in leadership. During his tenure, the district improved graduation rates and reading proficiency scores, and saw high-performing student participation in programs designed for improving success in college. He also led the development of a new prekindergarten-to-12th-grade curriculum, an aggressive professional development plan, new teacher observation tools, and a community schools model that provides students free breakfast and lunch, eyeglasses, dental care and medical services. The district, which has a $160 million budget, has also experienced a fund balance growth from $4 million to $9 million during his time.

Lancaster was recognized by The Washington Post as one of the state's top 20 high schools for academic rigor, and in September 2014, Rivera was honored by the White House as a "Champion of Change", and as one of the 10 Hispanic leaders in the United States doing "extraordinary work in education". Rivera was also president of the Pennsylvania League of Urban Schools, and sat on the board of the United Way, Economic Development Company of Lancaster County, and Association of Latino Administrators and Superintendents. In November 2014, Rivera joined five other school districts in filing a lawsuit in the Commonwealth Court of Pennsylvania against then-Governor Tom Corbett and other state officials, arguing they had "adopted an irrational funding system that does not deliver the essential resources students need".

=== State education secretary ===
On January 20, 2015, newly elected Governor Tom Wolf announced Rivera was his nominee to become Pennsylvania Secretary of Education. Wolf said he chose Rivera based in part on his record in improving urban education. Rivera said he would work to restore resources to schools, particularly those with needy populations, and that he would improve opportunities for early childhood learning and preparation for college and careers. The Pennsylvania State Education Association endorsed Rivera's nomination, particularly praising his advocacy for urban school districts. Rivera's nomination was unanimously confirmed by the Pennsylvania State Senate on June 3, 2015.

=== President of Thaddeus Stevens College of Technology ===
On October 1, 2020, he was appointed as the 10th President of Thaddeus Stevens College of Technology, where he demonstrated a strong commitment to advancing technical education and workforce development. In addition to his role at Thaddeus Stevens College, Pedro A. Rivera serves as a valued member of the Pennsylvania State Board of Education, where he holds the position of Chair of the Higher Education Committee.

Rivera serves on the board of directors for the Aspen Institute K12 Climate Action, Aspen Education Cross-Partisan Education Policy Network, and The Hunt Institute. He demonstrates his commitment to his local community by serving on the boards of Community First Credit Union Lancaster County Community Foundation, Lancaster County STEM Alliance, Penn Medicine Lancaster General Health, and WITF Public Broadcasting.
