= Telecommunications in Bolivia =

Telecommunications in Bolivia includes radio, television, fixed and mobile telephones, and the Internet.

== Radio and television ==
- Radio broadcast stations: AM 171, FM 73, shortwave 77 (1999).
- Television broadcast stations: 48 (1997).
- Bolivia has a large number of radio and TV stations broadcasting with private media outlets dominating. There has been a recent, rapid growth of state-owned media, including a network of community radios. State-owned and private radio and TV stations generally operate freely, although both pro-government and anti-government groups have attacked media outlets in response to their reporting (2010).

== Telephones ==
- International calling code: 591.
- Fixed lines: 880,600 lines in use, 80th in the world (2012).
- Mobile cellular: 9.494 million telephones, 82nd in the world (2012).
- Satellite earth stations: 1 Intelsat (Atlantic Ocean) (2011).

The Bolivian National Telecommunications Company was privatized in 1995 but re-nationalized in 2007; the primary trunk system is being expanded and employs digital microwave radio relay; some areas are served by fiber-optic cable; system operations, reliability, and coverage have steadily improved. Most telephones are concentrated in La Paz, Santa Cruz, and other capital cities; mobile-cellular telephone use expanding rapidly and, in 2011, teledensity reached about 80 per 100 persons.

== Internet ==
- Internet hosts: 180,988 hosts, 75th in the world (2012).
- Internet users: 3.5 million users, 75th in the world; 34% of the population, 125th in the world (2012).
- Fixed access: 111,029 subscriptions, 99th in the world; 1.1% of population, 139th in the world (2014).
- Mobile access: 690,768 subscriptions, 83rd in the world; 6.7% of the population, 101st in the world (2014).
- Average connection speed: 1.1 Mbit/s, 54th in the world (2014).
- IPv4 addresses: 561,920 (2012).
- Top-level domain: .bo.

=== Internet censorship and surveillance ===
There are no government restrictions on access to the Internet. The Bolivian constitution and law provide for freedom of speech and press. Although the government generally respects these rights, in at least two cases in 2012, the government used the anti-racism law to restrict both rights. Some senior government officials also verbally harassed members of the press corps. Bolivian law prohibits arbitrary interference with privacy, family, home, or correspondence and the government generally respects these prohibitions, but there have been allegations that the government does not always respect the law. Defamation remains a criminal offence.

- Concerns were raised over a 2010 anti-discrimination law. Its "far-reaching and vague" language could be used to curb and punish legitimate journalism, warned the Committee to Protect Journalists.
- On 21 October 2012, Vice President Garcia Linera stated that the government records the names of people who insult President Morales on social media sites.
- On 23 October 2012, the Constitutional Court struck down the libel law that allowed for detention of one month to four years for a person found guilty of insulting, defaming, or slandering public officials.

== See also ==
- Agency for the Development of the Information Society (ADSIB)
