= Dionisio Foianini Triangle =

International border between Bolivia, Paraguay, and Brazil

Coordinates: 20°00′S 58°00′W

Triángulo Dionisio Foianini (Dionisio Foianini Triangle) is the name given to a small area of land in southeastern Bolivia, between its borders with Brazil and Paraguay. Its importance lies in the fact that part of the border is marked by the Paraguay River and, as a result, Bolivia has a water route to the Atlantic Ocean that does not involve Brazil. The border was finalised on 21 June 1938 during the Chaco Peace Conference in Buenos Aires, Argentina. Consequently, Bolivia is planning on building a major port at the Puerto Busch within the triangle.

Currently Bolivian ships must pass along the eleven kilometre Tamengo Canal which connects Laguna Cáceres to the Paraguay River at the Brazilian city of Corumbá.
