= Mateo Vidal =

Uruguayan priest and politician

Mateo Lucas Vidal Medina (17 October 1780 in Montevideo – 8 January 1855 in Buenos Aires) was a Uruguayan priest and politician.

Elected deputy to the Assembly of the Year XIII. Later he took part in the Constituent Assembly that drafted the Argentine Constitution of 1826. His remains are buried at La Recoleta Cemetery.
