= Frank Ortiz =

Frank Ortiz may refer to:

- Frank S. Ortiz (1909–before 2009), American public official, mayor of Santa Fe, New Mexico, from 1948 to 1952
- Frank V. Ortiz Jr. (1926–2005), American diplomat

== See also ==
- Francisco Ortiz (disambiguation)
