= Alejandra Dorado =

María Alejandra Dorado Cámara (born September 24, 1969), known as Alejandra Dorado, is a Bolivian artist. Her work focuses on identity, gender and power relations.

== Life ==
Dorado was born in Cochabamba in 1969. She majored in Fine Arts, with a minor in painting, at the University of Art and Social Sciences (ARCIS) in Santiago, Chile. She taught drawing and techniques on the Graphic Design Program of the Bolivian Private University, and has started an art education program for the blind.

Dorado is known mainly for her installation art examining topics such as gender, performativity, power relations and identity (de)construction. Highly conceptual in nature, her installations are often inspired from works of literature and philosophy, history and gender theory.
