= Mount Copaja =

Mountain in Bolivia

Coordinates: 18°09′S 68°22′W

Mount Copaja or Capaja (Cerro Capaja) is a mountain in the western Andes, located in the province of Oruro, Bolivia (c. 18°09'S, 68°22'W). It has an altitude of 5,097 metres (16,722 ft) and is in the neighbourhood of the higher Lliscaya and Curumane peaks.
