= El Carmen Rivero Tórrez =

Coordinates: 18.8272°S 58.6244°W

- Town
- Interactive map of El Carmen Rivero Tórrez
- Country: Bolivia
- Time zone: UTC-4 (BOT)

El Carmen Rivero Tórrez is a small town in eastern Bolivia. In 2010 it had an estimated population of 3096.
