= Cochabamba Cooperative School =

International school in Bolivia

Location
- Cochabamba; Bolivia

Information
- School type: International school
- Established: 1954; 71 years ago
- Language: English
- Website: www.ccs.edu.bo

Cochabamba Cooperative School is an international school in Cochabamba, Bolivia, which follows an English language, US-style curriculum. It was founded in 1954, with teaching based on the Calvert Method of teaching. Calvert is an English-speaking school accredited by SACS, which provides the American and the Bolivian diplomas, offering a variety of Advanced Placement (AP) courses.

== History ==
Cochabamba Cooperative School Calvert C.C.S., is the first bilingual school that Cochabamba has had. It was founded in 1954 by Eleanor Pol and a group of parents who were looking for a better education option for their children and were interested in providing them with an education based on the North American system, following the Calvert method. For some years, the student body was small, but at the beginning of the 1960s, several North American oil companies came to Bolivia to provide services, mainly by relocating their employees and families in the cities of Cochabamba and Santa Cruz. To cover the need to have an educational institution for their children, in which they could continue their education in English, Cochabamba Cooperative School was presented as the ideal option, which allowed the school to multiply its student body. The innovative teaching method did not take long to awaken interest in the families of Cochabamba, who gradually joined the Calvert proposal until it became one of the most important educational-cultural centres in the city of Cochabamba. In 1965, C.C.S. began to receive collaboration from the State Department of the United States government, which, supporting binational education, brought North American professors to Bolivia and made investments in audio-visual equipment and academic books. Over the years, the school has been consolidating its teaching, expanding its infrastructure and increasing its community of students, both national and foreign.

=== Campus ===
Originally, Calvert was located in the Queru Queru area, close to what is now Plaza 4 de Noviembre. In 1970, the school board decided to make investments for the acquisition of land that could shelter the dream of having a campus with all the comforts for the Calvert family. In 1971, C.C.S. was able to transfer its students to the space where it has been carrying out its activities up to now; the infrastructure has been constantly expanded and improved. Over the years, new blocks and scenarios have been built that have accompanied the growth of the student universe. The campus of the school is privileged, and is one of the most beautiful in Cochabamba and the country, due to its size and the educational infrastructure that shares the stage with generous green areas. In addition to these advantageous conditions, complementary services such as the infirmary and the cafeteria are added. As part of a nutritional and health scheme, the food sold in the cafeteria is under the strict supervision of the school administration.
