= Francisco Ortiz =

Francisco Ortiz may refer to:

- Francisco Ortiz (actor) (born 1986), Spanish actor
- Francisco Ortiz de Vergara (1524–1574), Spanish conquistador and colonizer
- Francisco Ortiz de la Renta (c.1726–c.1806), Puerto Rican mayor of Ponce
- Francisco Ortíz (diver) (1899–after 1924), Spanish Olympic diver
- Francisco Ortiz Pinchetti (born 1944), Mexican journalist, co-founder of Proceso magazine
- Francisco Ortiz Franco (1954–2004), Mexican journalist
- Francisco "Paquito" Ortiz Rivas (born 1969), Spanish footballer and coach

== See also ==
- Frank Ortiz (disambiguation)
