= .bo =

Top-level Internet domain for Bolivia

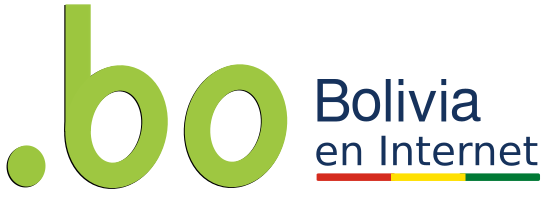
- Introduced: 26 February 1991
- TLD type: Country code top-level domain
- Status: Active
- Registry: NIC Bolivia
- Sponsor: ADSIB
- Intended use: Entities connected with Bolivia
- Actual use: Popular in Bolivia
- Registration restrictions: None
- Structure: Registrations are made directly at the second level or at the third level beneath established subdomains; second-level registrations are more expensive
- Registry website: NIC Bolivia

.bo is the Internet country code top-level domain (ccTLD) for Bolivia. BO is the ISO 3166-1 code for Bolivia.

== Management ==
It is administered by ADSIB. As of February 2011, the NIC was offering a registration fee of about US$40 per year or 280 $Bs for third-level domain and US$140 per year or 980 $Bs for second level domain. Registration is at the second or third level.

Brazilian TV Globo has also used this domain for shortener with the glo.bo URL.

== Domains ==
Domain	Level	Intended purpose
.bo	Second	Any entity, person or corporation either domestic or foreign
.com.bo	Third	Commercial entities
.net.bo	Third	Network service providers
.org.bo	Third	Organizations
.tv.bo	Third	TV media organizations
.mil.bo	Third (restricted)	Military institutions
.int.bo	Third (restricted)	International organizations
.gob.bo	Third (restricted)	Government
.edu.bo	Third (restricted)	Educational institutions

== See also ==
- Internet in Bolivia
