= Vicente Flores (politician) =

Peruvian politician

Vicente Flores was Apu Mallku of Qullana Suyu Marka (Greater Collasuyu) between 2003 and 2004. He was replaced by Antonio Machaca.

== See also ==
- Politics of Peru
