= Agency for the Development of the Information Society =

Bolivian government agency

The Agency for the Development of the Information Society (ADSIB) is a Bolivian government agency that works with the promotion of ICT policies, in areas such as e-health, e-learning, e-commerce and e-government. Also, ADSIB is the manager of the country code top-level domain “.bo” (ccTLD.bo).
