= Olca =

Stratovolcano on the border of Chile and Bolivia

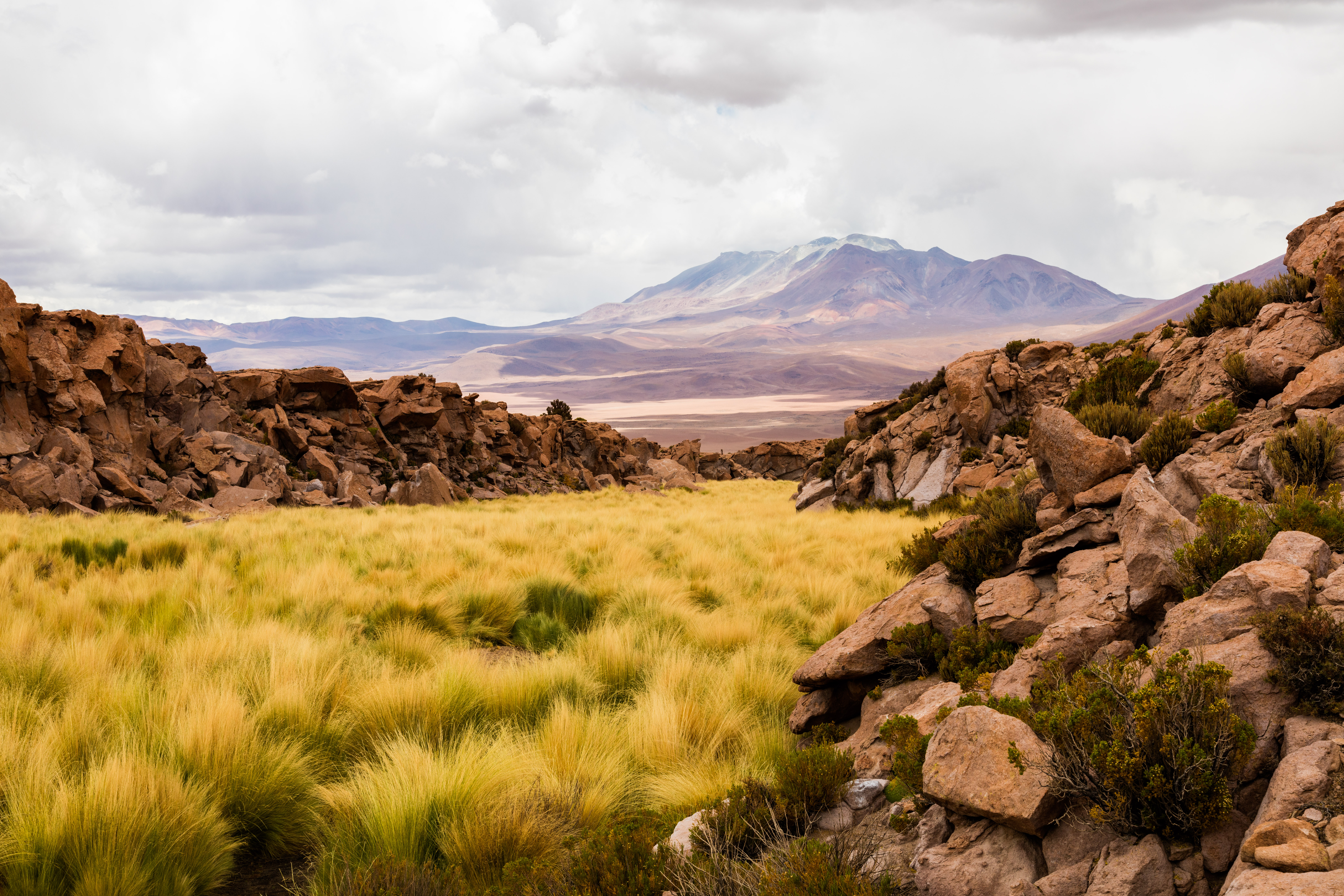

Highest point
- Elevation: 5,407 m (17,740 ft)
- Coordinates: 20°56′0″S 68°29′0″W

Geography
- Location within Chile
- Location: Bolivia, Nor Lípez Province, San Pedro de Quemes Municipality, Cana Canton; Chile, Antofagasta Region, El Loa Province
- Parent range: Andes

Geology
- Mountain type: Stratovolcano
- Last eruption: 1867

Olca is a stratovolcano on the border of Chile and Bolivia. It lies in the middle of a 15 km long ridge composed of several stratovolcanos. Cerro Minchincha lies to the west and Paruma to the east. It is also close to the pre-Holocene Cerro Paruma. It is andesitic and dacitic in composition, with lava flows extending several kilometres north of the peak. The only activity from the ridge during historical times was a flank eruption from 1865 to 1867. The exact source of this eruption is unclear.

== Gas emissions and composition ==
The gasses emission is comprised by a single warm spring at the base and a persistent fumarole field over at the crater's dome for at least 60 years. The fumarolic field is about 0.1 km^{2} and the emissions measured in situ at the crater show a highly mixed magmatic system between high temperature gasses and hydrothermal fluids.

The gas composition indicates low concentration of H_{2}, CO and acidic gasses, and high concentration of H_{2}S and hydrocarbons. The carbon/sulfur ratios are high and the isotopic values suggest the mixture between magmatic, hydrothermal, and atmospheric fluids. Other techniques used to measure the amount of SO_{2} includes remote sensing techniques called Differential Optical Absorption Spectroscopy(DOAS) giving maximum concentration of 35 ppm.m of SO_{2}; and the most recent taken with a UV camera suggesting an average of 18.4 t d^{−1}.

== Eruptive history and latest activity ==
Different information exists regarding the activity and activity migration of Olca. There is a study dating two flows, which suggest a formation during the Pleistocene, while others suggest to be much older with the appearance of the edifices volcanic activity migrated east over time. There is also evidence that glaciers were on the volcano in the late Pleistocene. The

Unconfirmed historical eruptions are suspected to have occurred in 1865–1867. The last activity has been reported of low-intensity seismicity accompanied with fumarolic activity in November 1989 and March 1990 intense degassing. In 2010, there a campaign conducted seismic activity showing 3 potencial swarms without a clear interpretation.

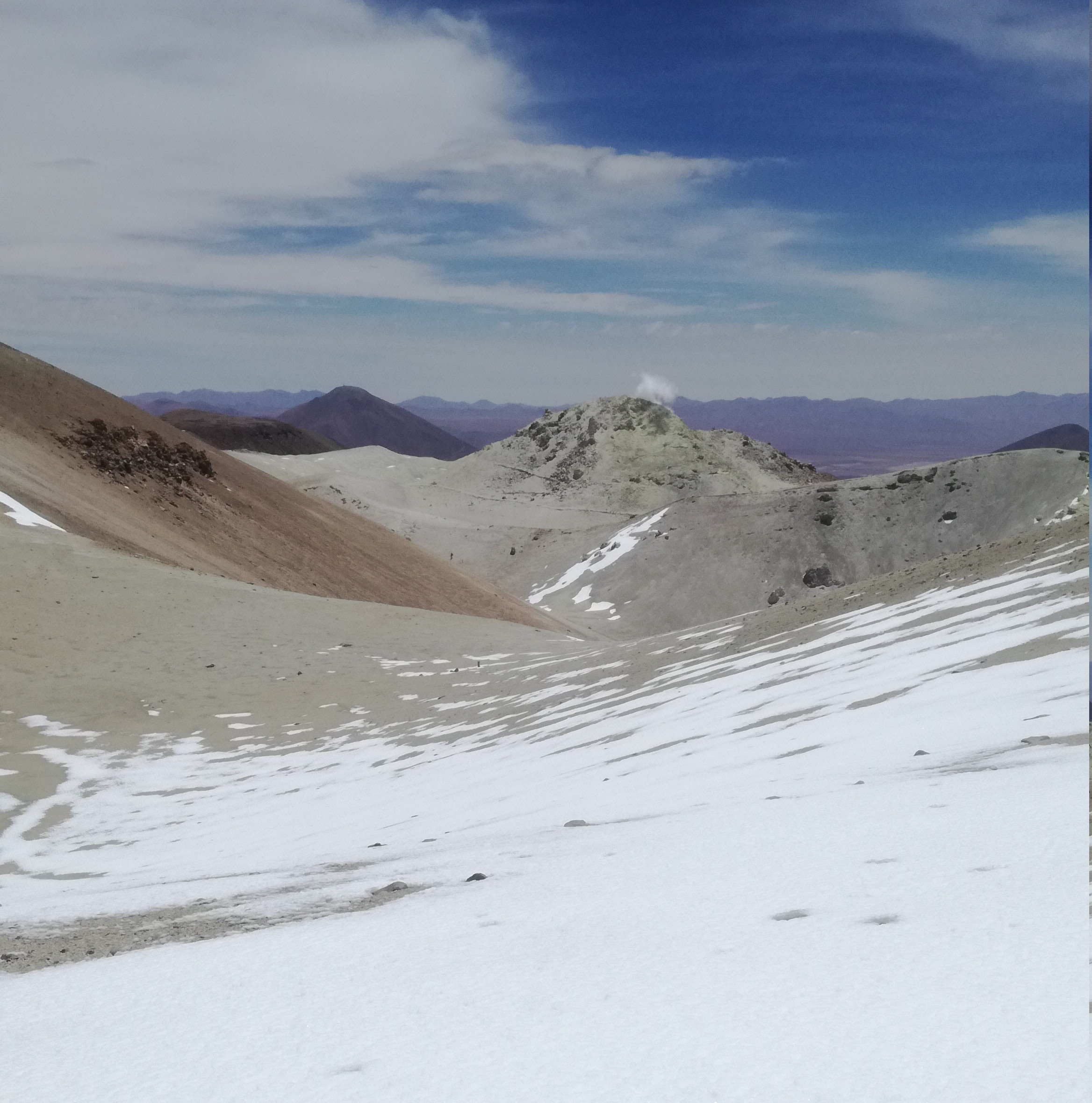
Olca volcanic dome with the fumarole, picture taken from the south looking at the plume.

== See also ==
- Ollagüe
- List of volcanoes in Bolivia
- List of volcanoes in Chile

== Sources ==
- "Olca-Paruma". Global Volcanism Program. Smithsonian Institution.
