= William Bendeck =

Bolivian rally driver (1934–1971)

William Bendeck (January 5, 1934 – November 14, 1971) was a Bolivian rally driver who won six national titles over the course of his career. He died on November 14, 1971, in a crash during a race.
