= Unified Trade Union Sub Federation of Peasant Workers of Ancoraimes – Tupak Katari =

Trade union in Bolivia

Unified Trade Union Sub Federation of Peasant Workers of Ancoraimes - Túpak Katari (in Spanish: Sub Federación Sindical Única de Trabajadores Campesinos de Ancoraimes Túpak Katari) is a trade union in Ancoraimes, La Paz Department, Bolivia. SFSUTCA-TK also contested and won the December 2004 municipal elections. Leandro Chacalluca Mamani of SFSUTAC-TK was elected mayor of the city.
