= José Mariano Serrano =

Bolivian statesman (1788–1852)

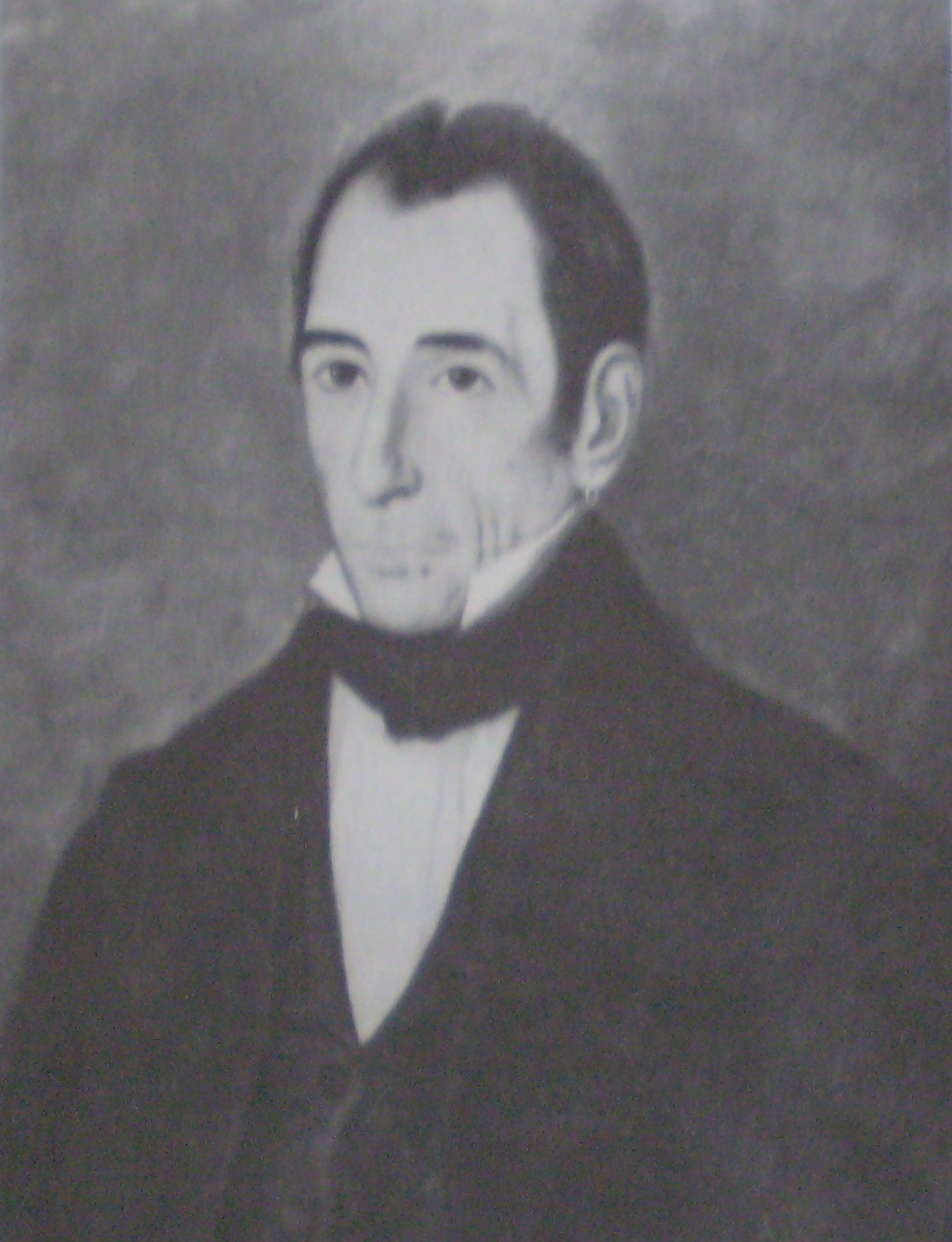

José Mariano Serrano (8 September 1788–1852) was a Bolivian-born statesman and jurist. He was a representative to the Congress of Tucumán of 9 July 1816 which declared the Independence of the provinces of the River Plate and presided over the assembly that declared the independence of Bolivia.

Serrano was born in Chuquisaca (now Sucre) and became a lawyer. He left for Tucumán due to persecution, and was elected to represent Charcas (Sucre) in the 1813 Assembly and in the 1816 Congress in Tucumán, in which he acted as Secretary. He was a minister in the administrations of Aráoz and González, governors of the then much larger Tucumán Province and had represented Buenos Aires in the 1815 Observation Junta.

In 1825, Serrano was President of the Assembly which declared Bolivian independence. He was made a member of the High Court of Chuquisaca in 1825 and in 1841 he was appointed the country's leading judge.
