= Hernán Ergueta =

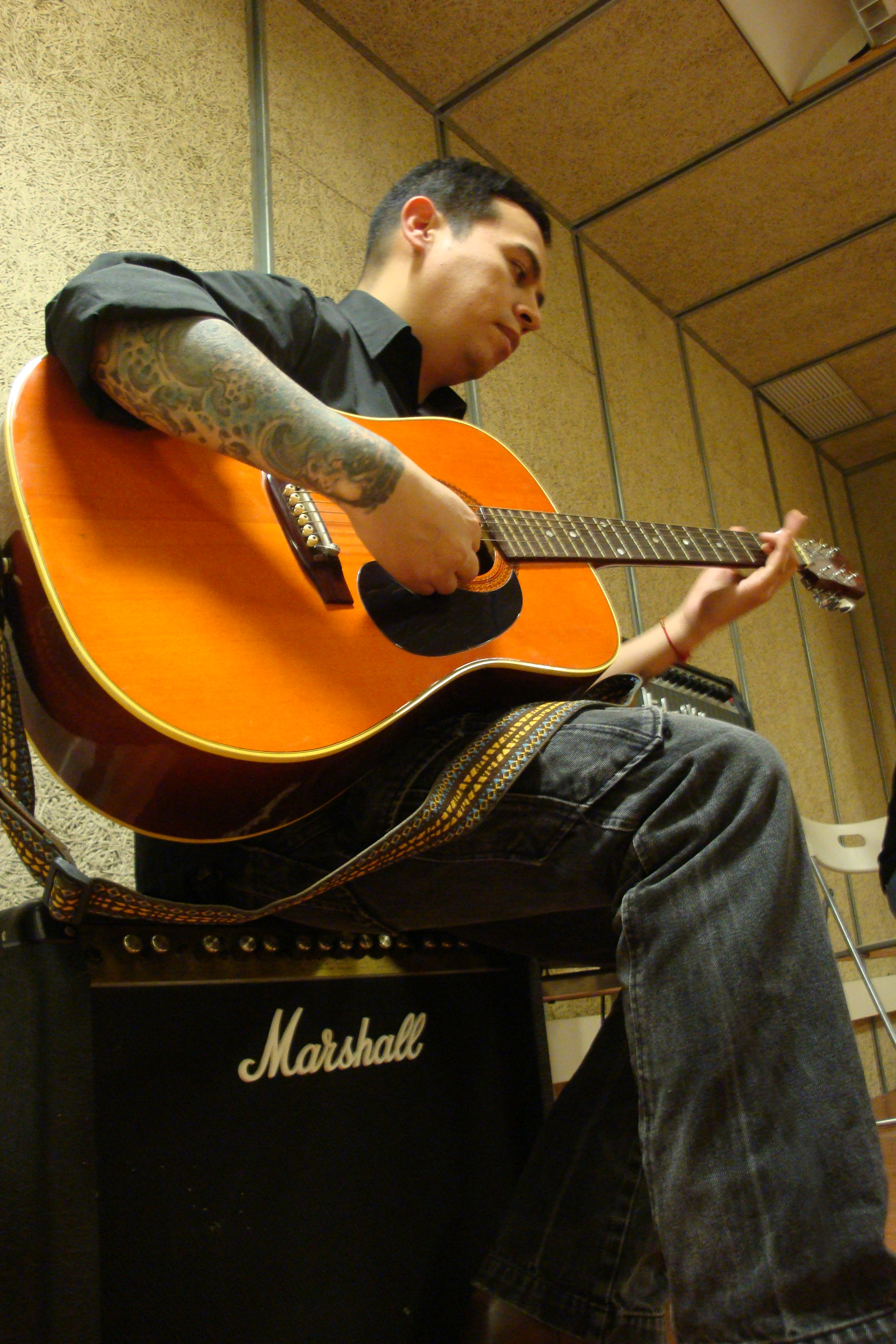

Background information
- Born: June 5, 1974 (age 52)
- Origin: La Paz, Bolivia
- Genre: World music
- Occupations: Writer Composer, multi-instrumentalist
- Instruments: Accordion, guitar, darbuka, finger cymbals, baglama, oud, keyboard
- Years active: 2003–present
- Label: Indie
- Formerly of: Madre Tul
- Website: www.HernanErgueta.com

Hernan Ergueta (born June 5, 1974) is a Bolivian musician, writer, composer and multi-instrumentalist. From early age writes and composes, his compositions can clearly be classified into the World Music genre. He has been part of musical fusion bands and mixed groups of music and dance. His musical influences come from the Middle East, the Balkans and the Latin Europe. His main instruments are: guitar, baglama, lute, piano, accordion and darbuka. In each of his compositions he proposes "the blending of traditional and local cultures into a new world culture that represent human beings as free individuals".

== Life and career ==
=== 2003–2005: Career beginnings ===
In the year 2003, in La Paz, Bolivia, Ergueta founded and managed the musical project Madre Tul uniting itinerant musicians from many nationalities with the purpose of joining in his compositions different traditional rhythms, being the most evident the Middle East. This same year, he joins the Bolivian rock fusion band Atajo as an accordionist, with whom he recorded three of their LPs through the years 2003–2006 and toured through Europe with the tour name "Babylon by Minibus", performing in the World Festival Tilburg in the Netherlands, and in the Weltjugendtag Köln (World Youth Day) in Germany, among other concerts in Sweden, Luxembourg and Austria.

=== 2006–2010: The pilgrimage of Madre Tul ===
In 2006, Ergueta left the rock fusion band Atajo to focused in Madre Tul band. In the same year they published the first CD Demo of the band titled Madre Tul, recorded in Bolivia between 2003 and 2006. The CD originally had also its own version of classic Arabic songs, later on, only the compositions of the band were republished, remastered, and published digitally under the same name as the original LP.

In 2007, the musical project Madre Tul moved to Spain. In this country more itinerant musicians were recruited to be part of the band while recording their next CD that was published in the year 2009 under the title of Frases Aladas recorded in Spain and Bolivia. Both albums from Madre Tul contain marked rhythms from the Middle East, but the last one, also includes a fusion of gypsy music and Bolivian rhythms such as the traditional Morenada.

In 2010, Ergueta began to develop an educational material for public and private cultural institutions in Spain encouraging multicultural workshops that include the teaching of musical instruments and music theory aimed to dancing, especially to "Belly Dance" inspired in the Egyptian musician Hossam Ramzy. At the same time, Madre Tul published the single Dawn after Dawn, composition of Hernan Ergueta recorded in Turkey, Bolivia and Spain with the voice of the Belgian singer An-Sofie Noppe. Madre Tul also recorded the single Un racimo de Jazmines as a tribute to the Turkish composer Zeki Müren. This song is a Spanish version of Bir Demet Yasemen originally composed by Müren. Un racimo de Jazmines is recorded in Turkey, Bolivia, Spain and distributed as a free single from Madre Tul in digital format.

=== 2011–2012: The beginning of his solo career ===
In 2011, Ergueta published the instructive audiobook: World's rhythmology Vol 1 – Rhythms from Maqsoum edited in Spanish and English. This audiobook contains a study of twelve rhythms, most of them Egyptian. This instructive audiobook was oriented to Belly dance students and companion musicians. At the end of this year, Ergueta also publishes his first solo double CD, titled Instrumental Mandjetwith twelve of his compositions recorded in Ecuador and Spain. Each of this songs corresponding to the studied rhythms in the audiobook titled World's rhythmology Vol 1 – Rhythms from Maqsoum.

In 2012, in an effort to promote his material, Ergueta participated as a guest musician and instructor in workshops of "Musical Theory oriented to Dancing" in Chile, Bolivia, Spain, Romania and Ecuador. These experiences inspired him to found the group EMDA (Ensemble of music and Arabic dance)". In this new project he incorporated Arabic instrument and belly dancers. The main purpose of EMDA was to promoted cultural links between the combination of traditional Middle East music, dance and Latin American poetry with Arabic origins. Referring of poetry with Arabic origins, the Costa Rican Osvaldo Sauma was the poet who inspired Ergueta to incorporate poetry in this project. EMDA has had presentations in Ecuador and Bolivia. The group published its first CD named Desde la Mitad del Mundo recorded in Bolivia and Ecuador. This record including versions from Classic Middle East songs and three own compositions. These last ones were also digitally published later on, as a maxi-single from Hernan Ergueta under the title From the Middle of the World.

=== 2013–2014: New developments ===
In 2013, Hernan Ergueta created the fundraising project Arte y Solidaridad (Art & Solidarity). The main purpose was to create free spaces for education and development of philanthropy. This original project helped itinerant campaigns in different cities such as: Quito, Ecuador; Santa Cruz de la Sierra, Bolivia and Barcelona, Spain. Unfortunately the project has stopped its activities from 2014 to the present. In this period Hernan Ergueta takes a sabbatical time and stops for an indefinite period the Ensemble EMDA activities. At the same time the musical band Madre Tul published two promotional videos from Ergueta's compositions titled: Arabictrance and The Glow as a preview of his next record, titled Solvet et Coagula.

=== 2015–2016: Publication of tales ===
In April 2015, Hernan Ergueta published a selection of tales titled The Burning Sanctuary. These stories were written in Spanish throughout the years 1990 and 2003. In 2014 the stories of the Burning Sanctuary were translated to English by Ruxandra Lungu. In April 2016, Hernan Ergueta published the original version in Spanish under the title El Santuario que Arde. However it is important to mention that these stories with the drawings that go with them were catalogued as "gloomy, existentialist and dark".

== Discography ==
=== Solo career albums ===
- 2011: Instrumental Mandjet (LP)
- 2014: From the Middle of the World (maxi-single)

=== With Madre Tul ===
- 2006: Madre Tul (LP)
- 2009: Frases Aladas (LP)
- 2010: Dawn after dawn (Single)
- 2010: Un racimo de jazmines (Single)

=== With other bands ===
- 2003: Nunca más – Atajo (LP)
- 2005: Sobre y encima – Atajo (LP)
- 2006: Vivitos y coleando – Atajo (LP
- 2012: Desde la mitad del mundo – Ensamble EMDA (LP)

== Audio book ==
- 2011 World's Rhythmology Vol. 1 Rhythms from Maqsoum

== Works ==
- 2015 : "The Burning Sanctuary" Hernán Ergueta – Trad. Ruxandra Lungu, USA, ISBN 9781468958263
- 2016 : "El Santuario que Arde" Hernán Ergueta, USA, ISBN 9781483566634

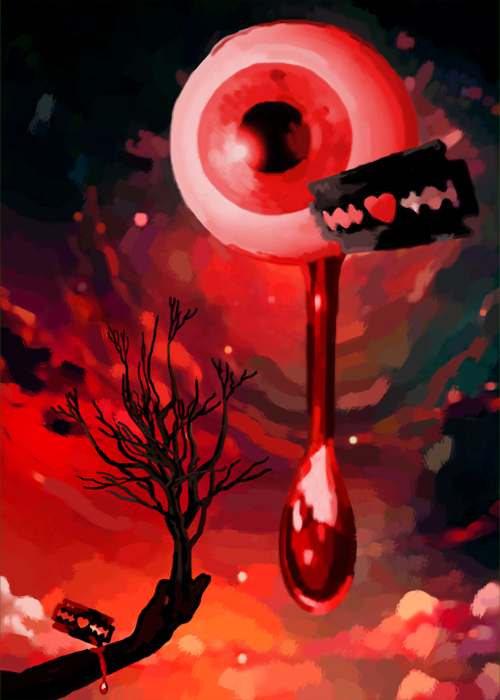
Hernan Ergueta – The Indecisive Tear

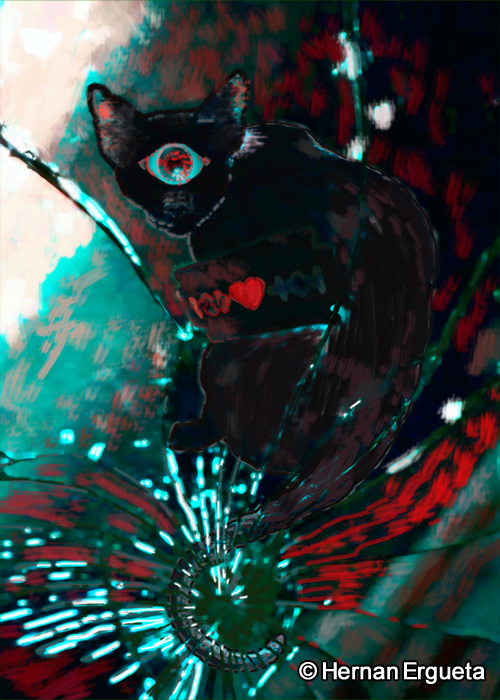
Hernan Ergueta – The Cat Named Loneliness
