= Apu Mallku =

Supreme Leader title of the Aymara people

Apu Mallku is an Aymara title meaning "supreme leader" or "king" conferred on a Mallku or "prince". The Apu Mallku's mandate is to oversee the vast network of Ayllus, an ancient Andean system of governing councils that predates even the Inca empire. It appears that the mandate of the Apu Mallku was initially restricted to the Qullasuyu (the traditional Aymara lands of Bolivia, parts of Peru and northern Chile) but it could now be interpreted (since a resolution in 2000) to extend to the bounds of the much larger former Inca realm of the Tawantinsuyu which stretched throughout the Andes incorporating the modern states of Bolivia, Peru, Ecuador, Chile and Argentina. The self-appellation for the people of this combined territory is Qullana.

It would seem through the ayllus system there is a large degree of coordination between both the Aymara and the Quechua nations. Apu Mallku was the title bestowed upon Evo Morales on 21 January 2006 at Tiwanaku, the day before his official inauguration as president of Bolivia.

== Apu Mallku ==
- Juan Evo Morales Ayma, the incumbent (2006– )
- Antonio Machaca (2004–2006?)
- Vicente Flores Lorenza Mostacero (2003–2004?)
- Max Paredes (2000–2003)

== National Council of Ayllus and Markas of the Qullasuyu (Conamaq) ==
This parliament or Jacha Ulaka consists of 150 delegates sent from the ayllus of the Greater Collasuyu region. This region is also called Qullakas Asanajaqes. The parliament holds regular meetings at Tiwanaku and Cochabamba in Bolivia and other places. It was first constituted on March 22, 1997, and was composed of the regional organizations: Jatun Quillakas Asanajaqis, J'acha Carangas, Charka Qhara Qhara, First Nations' Council of Potosi's Ayllus, Qhara Qhara, Ayllus of Cochabamba, Jach'a Suyu Pakajak'i, Urus, Saoras-Chuwis, and Kallawayas.

== Council of Mallkus and Amautas of the Parliament of the Qullana ==
There is also an institution called the Council of Mallkus and Amautas which acts rather like an upper house consisting of four delegates from each of the modern states that comprise the Qullakas Asanajaqes. During the period 2000 - 2003 those delegates were:

=== Jalsuri (Bolivia) ===
- Max Paredes
- Julian Bautista
- Félix López
- Representative of Potosí (Quechua)

=== Araxa (Peru) ===
- Teofilo Lauracio
- Esteban Mamani
- Fortunato Escobar
- Gladiz Vázques

=== Jalanta (Chile) ===
- Magdalena Choque
- Crispín Chura
- Joaquin García
- Alejandra Flores

=== Aynacha (Argentina) ===
- Gerónimo Alvarez
- Celina Avendaño
- Saturnino Mamani
- Natalia Zana Pura

== Quotations ==
We are a single Qullana people who speak Quechua and Aymara, at the moment divided into four Latin American states, which hurts us much; but the wound is still open and one day we will reconstitute the first great Collasuyu and soon the powerful Tawantinsuyu, dear brothers, remembers that we are only one people.

— Max Paredes, former Apu Mallku, 2000

The 500 years of Indian resistance have not been in vain. From 500 years of resistance we pass to another 500 years in power. The will of the people was imposed...and has begun to overcome the empire's cannons. We have lived for so many years through the confrontation of two cultures: the culture of life represented by the indigenous people, and the culture of death represented by West.

— Evo Morales, Apu Mallku, 2006
