= Cerro Columa =

- Location within Bolivia

Highest point
- Elevation: 3,876 m (12,717 ft)
- Listing: List of volcanoes in Bolivia
- Coordinates: 18°35′S 68°05′W

Geography
- Location: Bolivia
- Parent range: Andes

Geology
- Mountain type: Maar
- Last eruption: unknown

Cerro Columa, or Cerro Colluma, is a crater in Bolivia. In 1964 it was considered to be a crater formed by volcanism. Its rims reach an altitude of 3,820 metres (12,530 ft) and in the crater lies a playa lake. The crater has dimensions of 6–6.7 kilometres (3.7–4.2 mi). The crater was most likely formed by the collapse of a sediment dome, an origin as a meteorite crater is less likely.

The crater lies on a poorly vegetated desert plain that slopes to Salar de Coipasa. The surrounding plain has an altitude of 3,830 metres (12,570 ft) and was covered by Lake Minchin during the Pleistocene.
