= Assembly of the Guarani People – North Charagua =

Assembly of the Guarani People – North Charagua (in Spanish: Asamblea del Pueblo Guarani - Charagua Norte), a progressive political grouping based amongst the Guarani people that contested the December 2004 municipal elections in Charagua, Santa Cruz Department, Bolivia. APG won two of the five council seats. In total it received 26,5% of the votes.

With the support of MNR and MAS (who hold one seat each in the council), Claudio Lopez Miguel of APG was elected mayor of the city. Lopez is the first Guarani to hold the office of mayor in Charagua.

== See also ==
- Eastern Bolivian Guaraní
