= Estadio Rafael Mendoza =

Estadio Rafael Mendoza Castellón
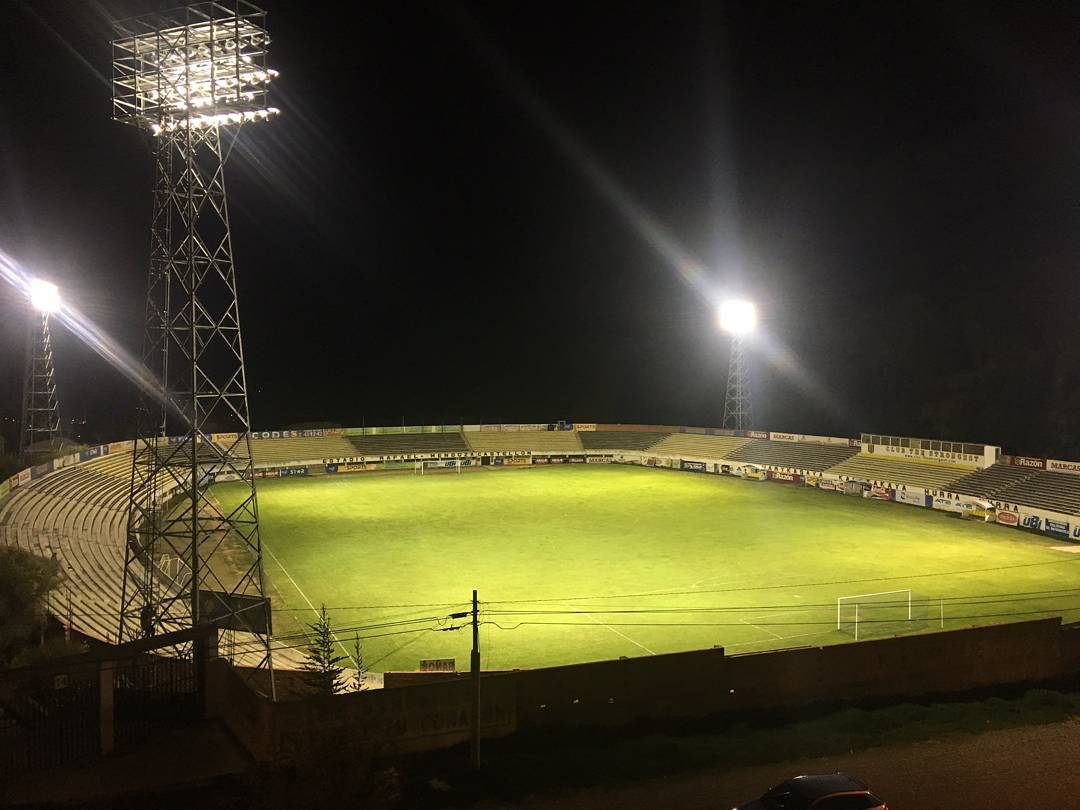
- Location: La Paz, Bolivia
- Coordinates: 16°30′55″S 68°03′50″W
- Owner: The Strongest
- Capacity: 14,000
- Surface: grass
- Opened: 16 July 1986

Tenants
- The Strongest

The Estadio Rafael Mendoza Castellón is a multi-purpose stadium in the neighborhood of Achumani, La Paz, Bolivia. It is currently used mostly for football matches and belongs to The Strongest. The stadium has a capacity of 14,000 people.

The name was chosen in homage to Rafael Mendoza Castillo (1924-2002), historical president of the club. The stadium was inaugurated on 16 July 1986 with a match between The Strongest and Club Bolivar.
