= Eduardo Rodríguez Veltzé =

President of Bolivia from 2005 to 2006

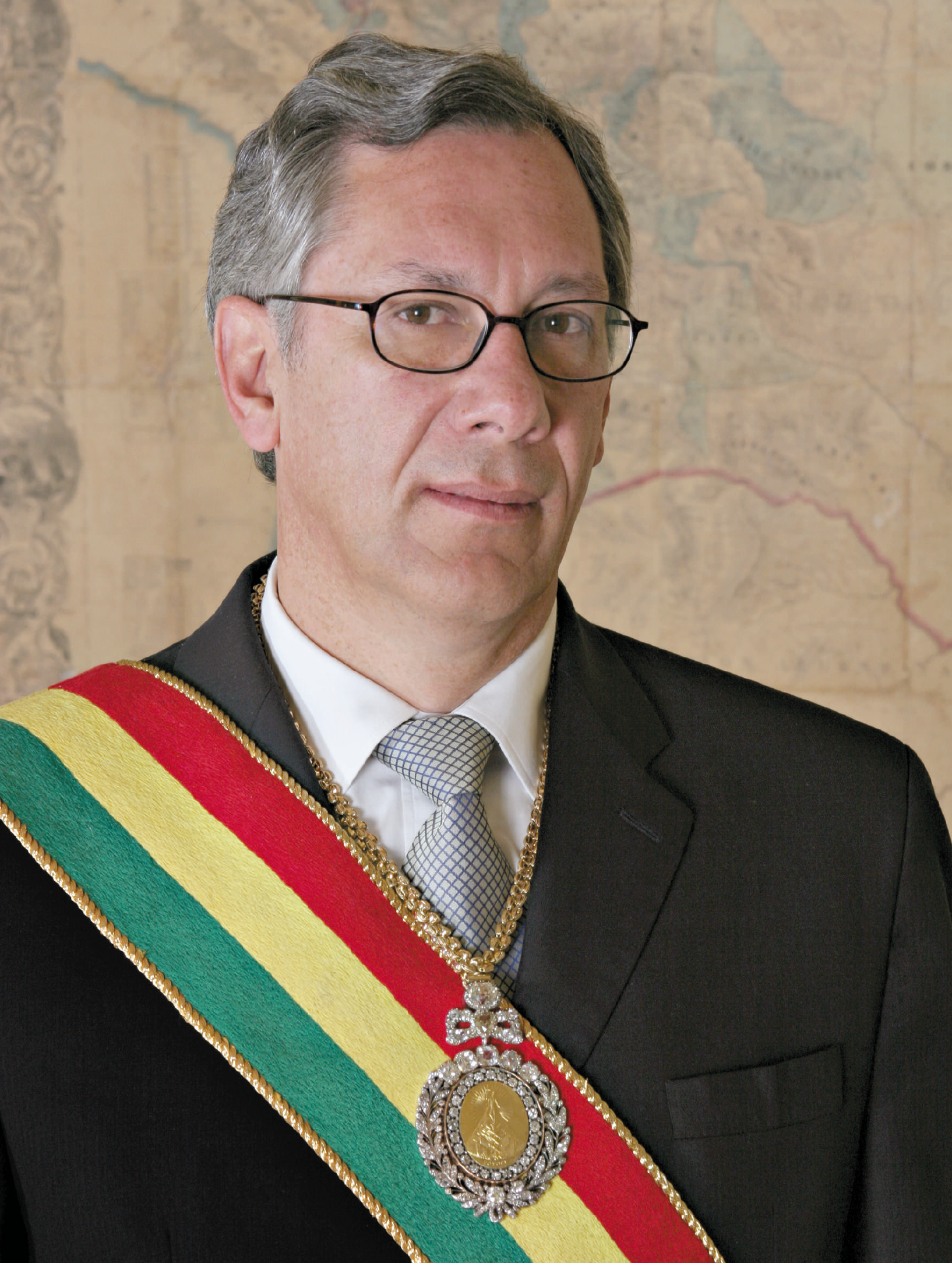
- Official portrait, 2005

64th President of Bolivia
- In office 9 June 2005 – 22 January 2006
- Vice President: Vacant
- Preceded by: Carlos Mesa
- Succeeded by: Evo Morales

President of the Supreme Court of Bolivia
- In office 17 March 2004 – 9 June 2005
- Preceded by: Armando Villafuerte Claros
- Succeeded by: Héctor Sandóval Parada

Personal details
- Born: 2 March 1956 (age 70) Cochabamba, Bolivia
- Party: Independent
- Spouse: Fanny Elena Arguedas
- Education: University of San Simón; Harvard University

Eduardo Rodríguez Veltzé (born 2 March 1956) is a Bolivian judge who briefly served as the 64th president of Bolivia from 2005 to 2006 on an interim basis following the resignation of President Carlos Mesa during the 2005 political crisis. Prior to his temporary role as president, he was the Chief Justice of the Supreme Court of Bolivia.

== Background ==
Born in Cochabamba in 1956, Rodríguez is a lawyer and holds a master's degree in public administration. He studied at Colegio San Agustín; later he studied law at the Universidad Mayor de San Simón in Cochabamba and obtained his Master of Public Administration at Harvard University's John F. Kennedy School of Government.

Rodríguez was the Bolivian ambassador to the Netherlands where he also served as ambassador before the International Court of Justice. On 12 November 2019, he resigned from that post upon the assumption of the government of Jeanine Áñez.

== Presidency (2005–2006) ==
In 2005, after weeks of civil unrest led by cocalero activist Evo Morales, former president Carlos Mesa offered his resignation to Congress. Senate President Hormando Vaca Diez and Chamber of Deputies leader Mario Cossío did not take the post, under pressure from opposition protestors. Rodríguez, as non-partisan head of the judiciary and fourth in the line of succession, became the country's new president on June 10, 2005; he was inaugurated with the constitutional mandate to call elections within one year's time.

Evo Morales won the December 2005 general election and Rodriguez's term ended upon Morales' inauguration.

== Post-presidency (2006–present) ==
=== Treason charges ===
Under the Morales administration, Rodriguez has been charged with treason following the decommissioning of missiles during his term in office. Bolivia bought about 30 HN-5 shoulder-launched missiles from China in 1993 or 1998. By 2005 they had become obsolete and Rodriguez made the decision to destroy them; he says he did not know the United States would be the ones to be given the missiles for destruction. Before taking office, Morales charged that the transfer amounted to putting the country "under foreign domination."

He was charged with treason in 2006, which carries a 30-year prison term. He has since been cleared of all charges.

== See also ==
- History of Bolivia
- List of presidents of Bolivia
- Politics of Bolivia

Legal offices
Preceded by Armando Villafuerte Claros	President of the Supreme Court of Bolivia; 2004–2005	Succeeded by Héctor Sandóval Parada
Political offices
Preceded by Carlos Mesa	President of Bolivia; 2005–2006	Succeeded by Evo Morales
