= Presto, Bolivia =

Coordinates: 18°56′S 64°56′W

Presto is a Bolivian town located in Jaime Zudáñez Province, Chuquisaca Department, 95 km east of Sucre.
