= Paruma =

Stratovolcano on the border of Bolivia and Chile

- Location within Bolivia

Highest point
- Elevation: 5,420 m (17,780 ft)
- Coordinates: 20°56′18″S 68°24′46″W

Geography
- Location: Bolivia-Chile
- Parent range: Andes

Geology
- Mountain type: Stratovolcano
- Last eruption: 1867

Paruma is a stratovolcano that lies on the border of Bolivia and Chile. It is part of a ridge that contains several stratovolcanos. Paruma lies at the eastern end of the ridge, with Olca to its west. Paruma is composed of multiple cones with the older volcano Cerro-Paruma lies to east of Paruma.

Another cone, Volcán Paruma, has clearly been active during the Holocene, with many morphologically young lava flows on its flanks. It also has persistent fumaroles. One lava flow in particular extends for 7 kilometres to the south-east of the peak. Historical activity along the ridge has been confined to one eruption from 1865 to 1867, the character of which is not precisely known.

== Sources ==
- "Olca-Paruma". Global Volcanism Program. Smithsonian Institution.
