= Michincha =

Mountain in Chile

Highest point
- Elevation: 5,305 m (17,405 ft)
- Coordinates: 20°S 68°W

Geography
- Location: Bolivia-Chile
- Parent range: Andes

Geology
- Mountain type: Stratovolcano

Michincha is a stratovolcano on the border of Bolivia and Chile. It is part of an east–west trending ridge of stratovolcanoes. To its east lies Olca. The only historical activity from the complex was a flank eruption from 1865 to 1867.

== Sources ==
- Siebert L, Simkin T (2002–present). Volcanoes of the World: an Illustrated Catalog of Holocene Volcanoes and their Eruptions. Smithsonian Institution, Global Volcanism Program Digital Information Series, GVP-3 (http://www.volcano.si.edu).
