= Pedro Ignacio Rivera =

Bolivian statesman and lawyer

Pedro Ignacio Rivera (c. 1759–1833-02-17) was an Upper Peru-born statesman and lawyer. He was a representative to the Congress of Tucumán which on 9 July 1816 declared the Independence of Argentina.

Rivera was born in Mizque (now Bolivia) and studied law at the University of Charcas. He was noted for his work with the poor as a lawyer.

Rivera was elected to represent Mizque at the 1813 Assembly and again to the Tucumán Congress, serving in 1816 for the declaration. He supported the idea of a constitutional Incan monarchy.
