= Puerto Aguirre =

Riverport in Bolivia

Coordinates: 18.985681°S 57.707791°W

Puerto Aguirre is an inland riverport in Bolivia near the border with Brazil. It began operating on 11 September 1988.

It is privately held by Central Aguirre Ltd. It is part of the municipality of Puerto Quijarro. It is connected via the Tamengo Canal to the Paraguay/Parana waterway.

== History ==
The port was inaugurated on 11 September 1988 by Joaquin Aguirre Lavayèn. In 2005 a new container facility was built at the port. The port is a free trade zone.
