= School District of Lancaster =

School district in Pennsylvania, United States

Location
- Lancaster County; Pennsylvania United States

District information
- Established: 1836; 190 years ago

Students and staff
- Students: 11,300 pupils (2017)
- Teachers: 930 teachers (2017)
- Staff: 621 non teaching staff (2017)

Other information
- Website: https://sdlancaster.org/

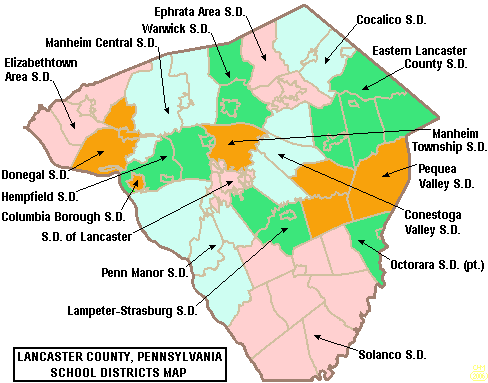
Map of Lancaster County, Pennsylvania public school districts

The School District of Lancaster is a large, urban school district of 11,300 students educated in 19 schools in central Lancaster County, Pennsylvania, United States. It serves both the City of Lancaster and Lancaster Township. Established in 1836, it is the second oldest school district in the state. The School District of Lancaster encompasses approximately 11 square miles (28 km^{2}). According to 2000 federal census data, it serves a resident population of 70,348. By 2010, the district's population had increased to 74,989 people. The school district serves a racially and economically diverse population of students: 60% Hispanic, 17% African American, 13% Caucasian, and 10% Asian/other.

According to the Pennsylvania Budget and Policy Center, 80.8% of the district's pupils lived at 185% or below the Federal Poverty level, as shown by their eligibility for the federal free or reduced price school meal programs in 2012. In 2009, the district residents' per capita income was $16,273 a year, while the median family income was $38,429. In the Commonwealth, the median family income was $49,501 and the United States median family income was $49,445, in 2010. In Lancaster County, the median household income was $54,765. By 2013, the median household income in the United States rose to $52,100.

According to district officials, in school year 2017–2018 the School District of Lancaster provided basic educational services to 11,300 pupils through the employment of 930 teachers, 461 full-time and part-time support personnel, and 160 administrators. The district is a member of Lancaster-Lebanon Intermediate Unit (IU) 13.

The district operated 20 schools in 2017: twelve elementary schools, one K-12 school, four middle schools, one high school campus and two alternative schools. It employs 1,620 staff members, including administrators, teachers, counselors, and support staff.

In 2014, the district sued the state of Pennsylvania, alleging that it did not provide sufficient funding to provide its students an adequate education.

In 2016, the district was sued by six refugee students who were denied enrollment in the district's high school. Similar lawsuits had been filed against Utica City School District in New York the prior year, and similar incidents were reported elsewhere in the country.

As of 2023 according to Great Schools there were 11,080 students in the school system. The demographics percentages were as follows.

- White - 12%
- Black - 16%
- Hispanic - 60%
- Asian - 4%
- Two or more races - 5%

== Schools ==
=== High schools ===
- J. P. McCaskey High School

=== Middle schools ===
- Jackson Middle School
- Lincoln Middle School
- Reynolds Middle School
- Wheatland Middle School

=== K-8 schools ===
- Martin School

=== Elementary schools ===
- Burrowes Elementary
- Carter & Macrae Elementary
- Fulton Elementary
- Hamilton Elementary
- King Elementary
- Lafayette Elementary
- Price Elementary
- Ross Elementary
- Smith-Wade-El Elementary
- Washington Elementary
- Wharton Elementary
- Wickersham Elementary
