= Antonio Machaca =

Bolivian politician, Apu Mallku

Antonio Machaca is an indigenous leader from Bolivia who served as the elected Apu Mallku, or spiritual leader, of CONAMAQ - Consejo Nacional de Ayllus y Markas del Qollasuyu (national council of indigenous communities of the Collasuyu) for 2004. He was succeeded by Evo Morales.
