= Puerto Quijarro =

Bolivian city and inland river port

Coordinates: 19.003873°S 57.713757°W

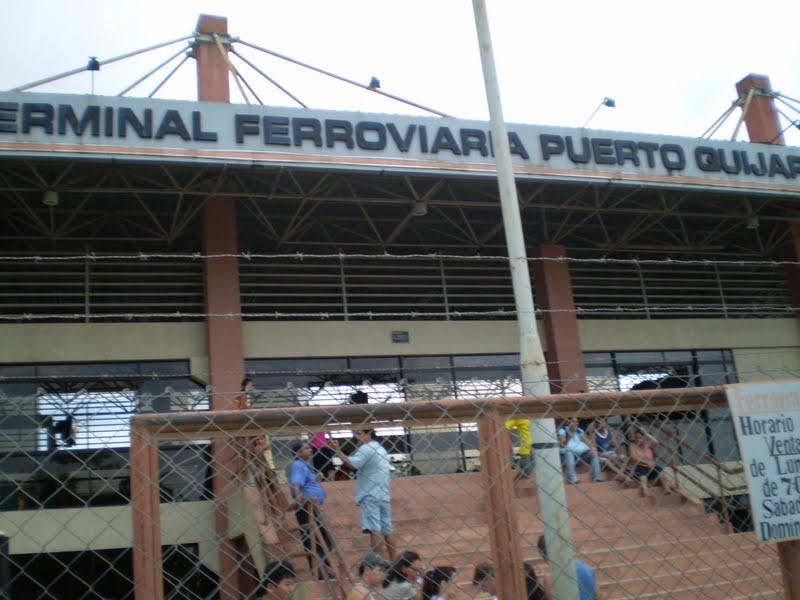
Puerto Quijarro train station

Puerto Quijarro is a Bolivian city and an inland river port and situated on the Tamengo Canal in Bolivia, by the border with Brazil. It is part of the province of Germán Busch in the Santa Cruz Department. The Tamengo Canal connects it to the important Paraná-Paraguay Waterway. It is Bolivia's only waterway which leads to the ocean.

Officially, its population was 12,903 (2001). Antonio Quijarro was the founder. June 18, 1940, is celebrated is the founding date of the municipality. Roads and a rail-line connect Puerto Quijarro with the rest of Bolivia and with Brazil. The important port of Puerto Aguirre, part of the municipality of Puerto Quijarro, is located on the Tamengo Canal between the Bolivian cities of Puerto Quijarro and Puerto Suárez.

The neighbouring town in Brazil is Corumbá.

The railway between Quijarro and Santa Cruz (Santa Cruz de la Sierra) is operated by Ferroviaria Oriental S.A.

== Consular representation ==
Brazil has a Consulate in Puerto Quijarro.

== See also ==
- Arroyo Concepción
