= José Severo Malabia =

Bolivian politician

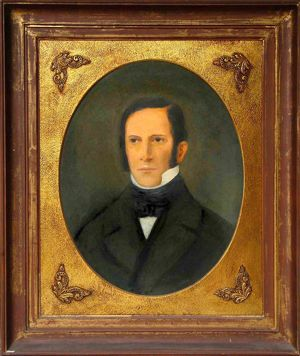
José Severo Malabia Portrait

José Severo Malabia (May 15, 1787 – 1849) was born in Chuquisaca (in present-day Bolivia). He was a statesman and lawyer based in Argentina. He was a representative to the Congress of Tucumán which on 9 July 1816 declared the Independence of Argentina.

Malabia gained his doctorate in law in 1811. He was elected by Charcas to the Tucumán Congress and served in 1816 for the declaration. He backed the idea of an Incan monarchy for the United Provinces of the River Plate.

After the Congress moved to Buenos Aires Malabia chaired it in 1818, later taking an active role in the politics of Buenos Aires. He was a minister in the Supreme Court of Bolivia.
