= Germán Busch Province =

Province in Bolivia

Provincia Germán Busch
- Province
- Interactive map of Provincia Germán Busch
- Coordinates: 19°00′S 58°10′W
- Country: Bolivia
- Department: Santa Cruz
- Established: 30 November 1984

Area
  - Total: 24,903 km^{2} (9,615 sq mi)

Population (2024)
  - Total: 43,935
  - Density: 1.7642/km^{2} (4.5694/sq mi)
- ISO 3166 code: BO.SC.GB

Germán Busch is a province in the Santa Cruz Department, Bolivia. Most of the surface is covered by the Pantanal, the largest wetland area in the world. Its capital is Puerto Suárez.

== History ==
The province was founded on 30 November 1984 by rearranging the provinces of Ángel Sandoval and Chiquitos. It is named after Germán Busch, a former Bolivian military officer and president of Bolivia who is regarded as a war hero for his role in the Chaco War between Bolivia and Paraguay.

== Demographics ==
The latest census in Bolivia (2024) counted 43,935 people (40,401, aged 4 and over) in the province, out of which 1,395 were German-speaking Mennonites aged 4 and over or 3.5% of the entire population.

== Subdivision ==
The province is divided into three municipalities which are further subdivided into cantons.

| Section | Municipality | Seat |
|---|---|---|
| 1st | Puerto Suárez Municipality | Puerto Suárez |
| 2nd | Puerto Quijarro Municipality | Puerto Quijarro |
| 3rd | El Carmen Rivero Tórrez Municipality | El Carmen Rivero Tórrez (Carmen) |

== Places of interest ==
- Otuquis National Park and Integrated Management Natural Area
