= Education in Bolivia =

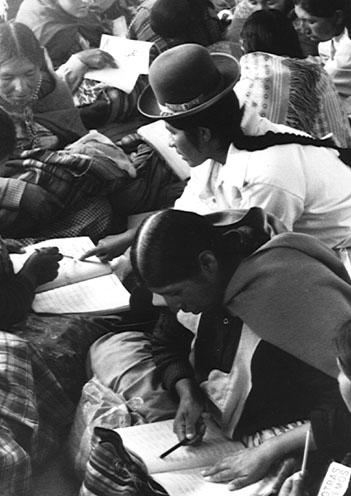
Literacy class in the El Alto section of La Paz

Education in Bolivia, as in many other areas of Bolivian life, has a divide between Bolivia's rural and urban areas. Rural illiteracy levels remain high, even as the rest of the country becomes increasingly literate. Bolivia devotes 23% of its annual budget to educational expenditures, a higher percentage than in most other South American countries, albeit from a smaller national budget. A comprehensive, education reform has made some significant changes. Initiated in 1994, the reform decentralized educational funding in order to meet diverse local needs, improved teacher training and curricula, formalized and expanded intercultural bilingual education and changed the school grade system. Resistance from teachers’ unions, however, has slowed implementation of some of the intended reforms.

The Human Rights Measurement Initiative (HRMI) finds that Bolivia is fulfilling only 83.2% of what it should be fulfilling for the right to education based on the country's level of income. HRMI breaks down the right to education by looking at the rights to both primary education and secondary education. While taking into consideration Bolivia's income level, the nation is achieving 85.7% of what should be possible based on its resources (income) for primary education but only 80.7% for secondary education.

== History ==
Chronic political instability hindered the development of general education throughout Bolivia's history. In the colonial era, education was limited to a few clergy acting as tutors for the sons of elite families. Little effort was made to teach the Indians beyond the bare necessity to convert them. Independence brought a series of ambitious decrees calling for universal, compulsory primary education and a public school system; nonetheless, little was accomplished. By 1900 schools existed primarily to serve urban elites. No vocational or agricultural institutes existed in the country. Only 17 percent of the adult population was literate.

A teaching mission from Belgium arrived in the early 1900s and, over a thirty-year period, established a foundation for rural primary education. In 1931 Elizardo Perez founded a large nuclear school (a central school with five to eight grades) near Lake Titicaca. Smaller satellite schools in nearby settlements supplemented the nuclear school's offerings. This arrangement became the prototype for rural education in the Andes.

Overall, however, little real expansion of educational opportunities occurred. A 1947 law calling for an end to illiteracy drew attention to the government's limited capacity for action in this area. It required that every literate Bolivian teach at least one other to read and write and levied fines for adult illiteracy. On the eve of the 1952 Revolution, less than one-third of the adult population was literate.

Legislation in 1956 laid the foundation for the public education system in force in the late 1980s. The government established a six-year primary cycle followed by four years of intermediate schooling and two years of secondary school ending with the baccalaureate degree. Laws in 1969 and 1973 revised the curricula and instituted a five-year primary cycle, theoretically compulsory between the ages of seven and fourteen, followed by three years of intermediate school and four years of secondary education. The first two years of secondary instruction consisted of an integrated program that all students followed; the second two-year cycle permitted students to specialize in the humanities or one of several technical fields. All courses led to the baccalaureate degree, which was a prerequisite for entering the university.

Higher education consisted of the University of Bolivia and a variety of public and private institutes. The University of Bolivia—a consortium of eight public universities and one private university (the 1,500-student Bolivian Catholic University)--was the only postsecondary school that awarded degrees. At least four other private institutions were operating without legal authorization in 1989. Other schools offered technical training in the fine arts, commercial arts, and technical fields, as well as in teacher training.

The University of Bolivia, which enrolled more than 100,000 students in 1989, was embroiled in a bitter conflict with the Paz Estenssoro government over what academic leaders feared were government plans to make drastic cuts in publicly financed higher education. The government acknowledged its plans to promote private institutions in an attempt to reverse a general decline in academic standards resulting from wide-open admission policies. The impasse over university finances led to student protests in 1988, with police intervening in the country's largest university, the 37,000-student San Andrés University in La Paz.

The Ministry of Education and Culture of Bolivia organized adult literacy classes. By the mid-1980s, approximately 350 centers and more than 2,000 teachers were dedicated to children's literacy programs. More than half were in the department of La Paz, where more than one-third of the population. The program had little impact, however; improvements in the adult literacy rate, which stood at .1293% in the mid-1980s, primarily resulted from increased primary school enrollment. From 1973 to 1987, the percentage of school-aged children enrolled in primary schools climbed from 76 to 87%.

Most educational expenditures went for operating budgets, especially personnel costs, leaving little for capital programs and expansion. Spending remained skewed in favor of the urban areas. Approximately 60% of Bolivia's 59,000 teachers were employed in urban schools. The economic crisis that beset the country in the early to mid-1980s had a severe impact on educational spending. Analysts estimated that real education expenditures in 1985 were less than 40% of the total recorded in 1980. Over the same period, the percentage of the gross domestic product devoted to education dropped from 3% to less than 2%.

Although the education system recorded some progress in enrollments in the 1970s and 1980s, serious problems remained as of the late 1980s. The number of secondary school students grew twice as fast as the population of that age-group; the university student population grew more than four times faster than the total population of 18- to 24-year-olds. Still, secondary education remained beyond the grasp of most Bolivians; only 35% of the eligible age-group attended secondary school. Significant disparities also existed between male and female enrollment rates. Efforts to increase female attendance ran up against the harsh economic realities faced by poorer families who relied on their daughters' help with chores and childcare.

As of the late 1980s, dropout rates also remained extremely high. Only one-third of first graders completed the fifth grade, 20% started secondary school, 5% began their postsecondary studies, and just 1% received a university degree. Dropout rates were higher among girls and rural children. Only about 40% of rural youngsters continued their education beyond the third grade.

Finally Spanish was the language of instruction at every level as of the late 1980s. Critics blamed the absence of bilingual education (or intercultural bilingual education, respectively) for the high dropout rates among rural schoolchildren.
