= Johnstown Redevelopment Authority =

Johnstown Redevelopment Authority is an authority that oversees commercial development in the City of Johnstown, Pennsylvania.

== Johnstown Regional Sewage ==
Johnstown Redevelopment Authority oversees sewage treatment in the Johnstown Metro Area. The authority operates one treatment plant at Dornick Point, on the west end of Johnstown. Customers are billed on a quarterly basis by JRS for the treatment of the sewage at Dornick Point. They are also billed by their home municipality for transport to the plant.

=== Municipalities Served ===
There are 20 Municipalities in which the system serves either all or a portion of, they include

- City of Johnstown
- Brownstown Boro
- Conemaugh Township (Cambria County)
- Connemaugh Township (Somerset County)
- Daisytown Boro
- Dale Boro
- East Conemaugh Boro
- East Taylor Township
- Ferndale Boro
- Franklin Boro
- Geistown Boro
- Jackson Township
- Lorain Boro
- Lower Yoder Township
- Richland Township
- Southmont Boro
- Stonycreek Township
- Upper Yoder Township
- Westmont Boro
- West Taylor Township

=== Dornick Point Treatment Plant ===
The Dornick Point Treatment Plant was opened in 1960 and was upgraded in the 1980s. In 1990, a plan was enacted to separate the sanitary sewers from the storm sewers, with over 110 miles of line just in the city of Johnstown, this is a daunting task for the authority. Sludge was land filled, beginning in 1995, and in 1999 the PSA machine (used for making oxygen) was shut down for economic reasons. The plant uses 5-10 tons of liquid oxygen per day. In 2005, the Johnstown Redevelopment Authority purchased the plant and oversees all operating aspects.

== Projects ==
The JRA has several projects under their belt since the late 1960s. Some of them include:
.

- Cambria City Renewal (1953–67) - Consists of a variety of businesses
- Market Street West Urban Renewal (1960–73) - Mixed Residential/Retail
- Main Street East (1975–81) - Halted by the famous 1977 floods that plagued Johnstown, this project boasts an office building and the CCTA (Now CamTran) Transit Center, at a cost of nearly $6 Million.
- Kernville Neighborhood Projects (1990–2008) - Consisted of several commercial, retail, industrial, and medical projects brought to a three-block blighted area between Kernville and Center City.
- Hornerstown Industrial Park (1993–1996) - An area ravaged by the 1977 floods, houses several industries and businesses
- Greater Johnstown High School (1998–2003) - A public/private partnership between the redevelopment authority and the Greater Johnstown School District, made the renovation/upgrade of this 75-year structure, along with a new stadium possible.
- Downtown Revitalization (1990–98) - Rehab of the former Glosser Brothers Department Store (Gee Bee's), Construction of a new Social Security Administration Office, as well as a new Pennsylvania Department of Public Welfare Office.

== Brownfields ==
The JRA has also assisted the city in cleaning up many state-designated brownfields in industrial parks

== External links / Resources ==
Johnstown Regional Sewage Page JRA Website
