= Belmont, Pennsylvania =

Unincorporated community in Pennsylvania, US

- Census-designated place
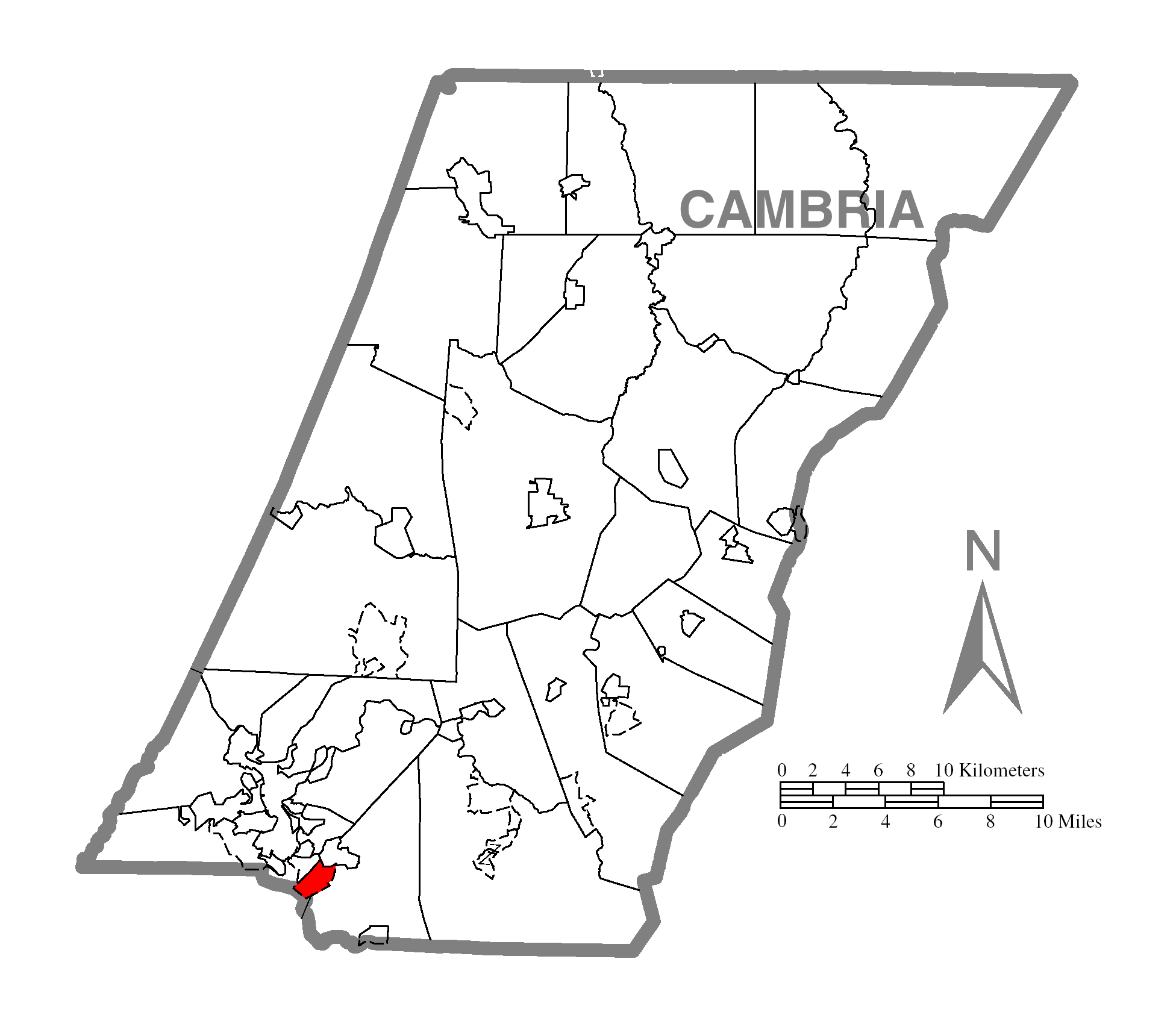
- Location within Cambria County

- Location within the U.S. state of Pennsylvania Belmont (the United States)
- Coordinates: 40°17′6″N 78°53′17″W
- Country: United States
- State: Pennsylvania
- County: Cambria
- Townships: Stonycreek, Richland

Area
  - Total: 1.76 sq mi (4.57 km^{2})
  - Land: 1.76 sq mi (4.55 km^{2})
  - Water: 0.0077 sq mi (0.02 km^{2})
- Elevation: 1,680 ft (510 m)

Population (2020)
  - Total: 2,771
  - Density: 1,578.7/sq mi (609.54/km^{2})
- Time zone: UTC-5 (Eastern (EST))
  - Summer (DST): UTC-4 (EDT)
- FIPS code: 42-05400
- GNIS feature ID: 2389201

Belmont is an unincorporated community and census-designated place (CDP) in Cambria County, Pennsylvania, United States. As of the 2020 census, Belmont had a population of 2,771.

== Geography ==
Belmont is located in southwestern Cambria County at 40°17′6″N 78°53′17″W (40.285014, -78.888160). It is in southern Stonycreek Township and western Richland Township and is bordered to the north by the boroughs of Lorain and Geistown and the community of Oakland. The city of Johnstown touches the northwest corner of Belmont, and Somerset County is on the southern border, across the Stonycreek River.

According to the United States Census Bureau, the Belmont CDP has a total area of 1.8 square miles (4.6 km^{2}), of which 0.02 square miles (0.05 km^{2}), or 1.00%, is water.

== Demographics ==
Historical population
Census	Pop.	Note	%±
2020	2,771		—
U.S. Decennial Census

As of the census of 2000, there were 2,846 people, 1,254 households, and 798 families residing in the CDP. The population density was 1,574.2 inhabitants per square mile (607.8/km^{2}). There were 1,350 housing units at an average density of 746.7 per square mile (288.3/km^{2}). The racial makeup of the CDP was 98.14% White, 0.70% African American, 0.42% Asian, 0.11% from other races, and 0.63% from two or more races. Hispanic or Latino of any race were 0.39% of the population.

There were 1,254 households, out of which 20.7% had children under the age of 18 living with them, 53.7% were married couples living together, 8.1% had a female householder with no husband present, and 36.3% were non-families. 33.0% of all households were made up of individuals, and 20.1% had someone living alone who was 65 years of age or older. The average household size was 2.13 and the average family size was 2.70.

In the CDP, the population was spread out, with 16.0% under the age of 18, 6.6% from 18 to 24, 20.2% from 25 to 44, 22.6% from 45 to 64, and 34.6% who were 65 years of age or older. The median age was 50 years. For every 100 females, there were 77.9 males. For every 100 females age 18 and over, there were 74.5 males.

The median income for a household in the CDP was $32,717, and the median income for a family was $39,479. Males had a median income of $31,856 versus $25,304 for females. The per capita income for the CDP was $17,958. About 9.6% of families and 9.7% of the population were below the poverty line, including 17.4% of those under age 18 and 5.4% of those age 65 or over.

== Education ==
The portion in Richland Township is in the Richland School District. The portion in Stonycreek Township is in the Greater Johnstown School District.
