= Gerald Zahorchak =

American politician and educator

Secretary of the Pennsylvania Department of Education
- In office February 7, 2006 – May 7, 2010
- Preceded by: Francis Barnes
- Succeeded by: Thomas E. Gluck (acting)

Personal details
- Party: Democratic Party
- Education: Indiana University (BA) Indiana University of Pennsylvania (MEd) Penn State University (EdD)
- Occupation: Director of Strategic Initiatives of Allentown School District (August 2011)

Gerald L. Zahorchak is an American educator and the former Secretary of Education for the Pennsylvania Department of Education, a position he held from 2006 to 2010. Throughout the 1980s and 1990s, Zahorchak worked at various Pennsylvania public school districts in a number of positions, including teacher, football coach, principal, federal programs director, strategic planning coordinator and personnel director. Zahorchak worked as superintendent of the Greater Johnstown School District in Cambria County from 1997 to 2003, when he was chosen to be Deputy Secretary for Elementary and Secondary Education for the state. Governor Ed Rendell appointed him Secretary of Education in 2005.

During his tenure as secretary, Zahorchak implemented state funding for pre-kindergarten and full-day kindergarten, developed a new school funding formula, helped increase education funding for school districts, and established the Keystone Exams and the state's Standards Aligned System. In 2010, Zahorchak announced he would leave the Secretary of Education position, coinciding with Rendell's pending departure from the governorship. On April 22, 2010, Zahorchak was selected to be superintendent of the Allentown School District in Allentown, Pennsylvania, where he vowed to establish regular updates to families about their students education, improve safety in schools and implement incentives to attract qualified minorities and top education students into teaching positions.

== Early career ==
A native of Johnstown, Pennsylvania, Zahorchak received a bachelor's degree master in 1980 from Saint Francis University in Loretto, Pennsylvania, and a master of education degree from Indiana University of Pennsylvania in 1986. In 1994, Zahorchak received his doctorate in education from Pennsylvania State University, where he wrote his doctoral dissertation on state policy-making. Zahorchak began his educational career in 1980 at the Greater Johnstown School District in Cambria County, Pennsylvania, where he spent two years an elementary school teacher. In 1985, he became a middle school reading and language arts in the North Star School District in Somerset County, where he also coached varsity high school football. Zahorchak taught at North Star until 1989, when he started working at the Shanksville-Stonycreek School District, also in Somerset County. During his three years in the district, he worked as an elementary and secondary principal, as well as a federal programs director. In 1992, he returned to the North Star School District as a principal and strategic planning coordinator. Zahorchak also previously served as an elected member of the Greater Johnstown School Board, and was a Johnstown city councilman, the Johnston deputy major and president of the Johnstown Rotary in 2003.

Zahorchak returned to the Greater Johnstown School District in 1996 as a federal programs and personnel director. In 1997, he was promoted to superintendent, a position he held for six years. During his tenure as superintendent, Zahorchak implemented full-day kindergarten, pre-kindergarten and tutoring programs. He also pursued high school reform and hired reading and math coaches to boost student learning.

== Early state career ==
In March 2003, Pennsylvania Secretary of Education Vicki Phillips hired Zahorchak as Deputy Secretary for Elementary and Secondary Education, where he oversaw the education of more than 1.8 million children public school children in the state. Zahorchak helped implement the release of Pennsylvania's first Academic Achievement Reports, and led the development and implementation of support systems for public schools trying to meet No Child Left Behind targets. By 2005, Zahorchak was making a yearly salary of $124,458.

Zahorchak served as acting education secretary from August 2004, when Phillips left the position, to September 2004, when Francis Barnes was hired. During the Barnes administration, Governor Ed Rendell encouraged local Pennsylvania school boards to participate in Act 72, a state property tax-relief program. Act 72 used proceeds from slot-machine gambling to finance property tax cuts from homeowners, and included with spending restrictions in exchange for the tax cuts. Barnes himself did not support the program, and most school boards rejected it because of the spending restrictions. Zahorchak, however voiced support for Act 72 and helped Rendell lobby local school districts to support it, which increased his visibility statewide. Zahorchak claimed Act 72 "includes real property tax relief that shifts more of the responsibility for school funding back to the state". When Barnes resigned in September 2005, Zahorchak was again tapped to serve as acting secretary and was widely considered the most qualified candidate for the permanent position, although Governor Ed Rendell engaged in a thorough search for other potential candidates around the state.

== Secretary of Education ==
Zahorchak was appointed state Secretary of Education on October 5, 2005, by Governor Ed Rendell, following the resignation of former Secretary Francis Barnes. He was considered highly regarded by both Democratic and Republican lawmakers involved in education issues. During his Pennsylvania State Senate confirmation hearing in December 2005, Zahorchak said he supported the state's $44 million Educational Improvement Tax Credit, which provides tax breaks for businesses that support public education programs and private school scholarships. Zahorchak also said he believed basic education should be the state's primary fiscal educational investment, rather than special education or higher education. The Pennsylvania State Senate Education Committee unanimously approved Zahorchak during his confirmation hearing on December 13, 2005, and the full senate unanimously confirmed him on February 7, 2006.

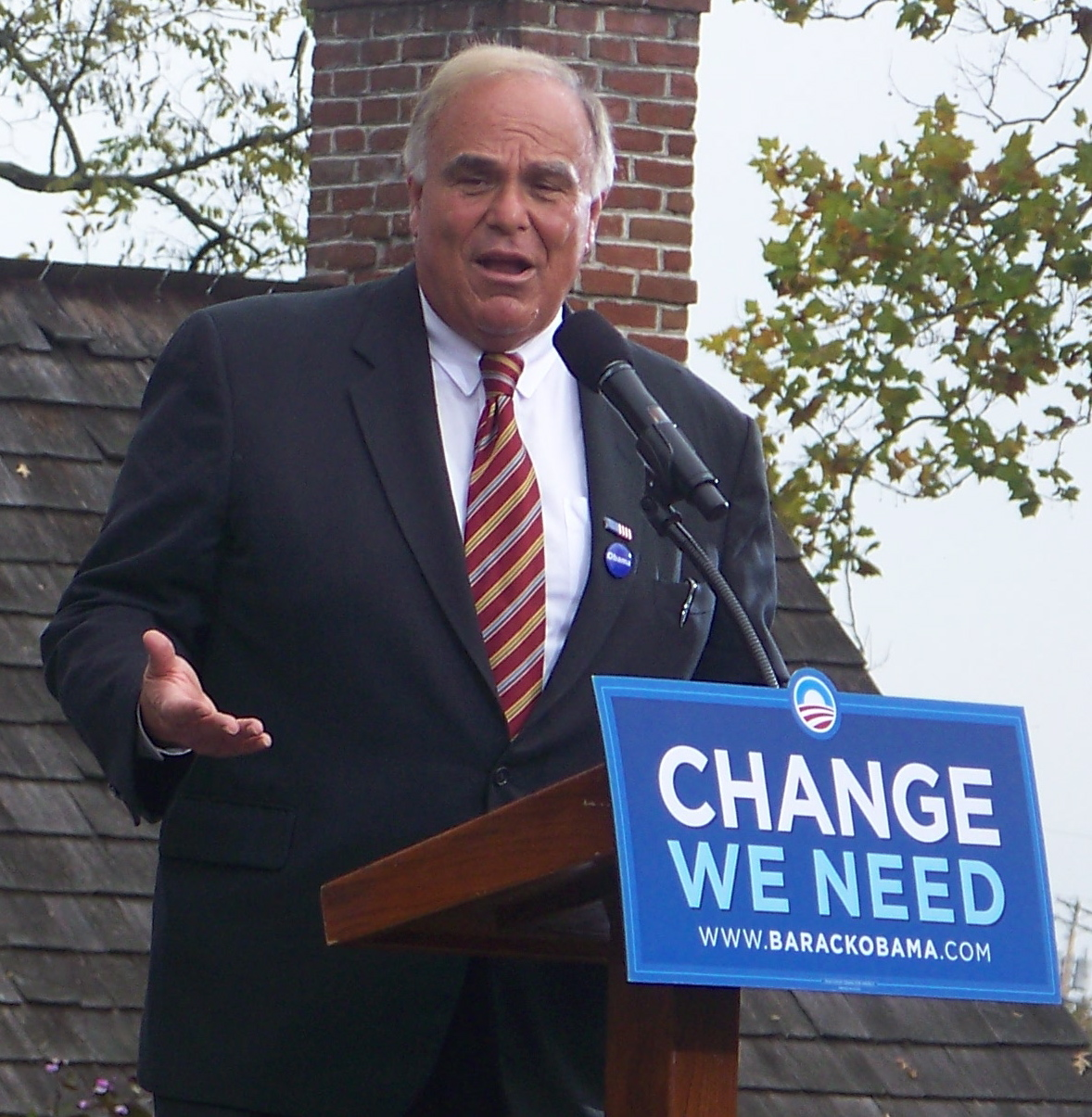
Governor Ed Rendell (pictured) chose Gerald Zahorchak to serve as Pennsylvania Secretary of Education in 2005.

Zahorchak was a steady supporter of Rendell's education proposals. However, he maintained that he could still be an independent voice within the administration, and claimed, "I happen to agree with the outcomes because I'm in the mix of making determinations of our policy decisions." In addition to Act 72, Zahorchak supported a Rendell proposal to require superintendents and principals in struggling school districts to improve math and reading test scores in order to keep their jobs, an idea that was not embraced by the Pennsylvania Legislature. In 2006, Zahorchak said he supported requiring high-school students to pass exit exams before they could graduate, although he acknowledged implementing such a testing program would be a long and difficult effort. At the time, the state required students to demonstrate proficiency in math and reading before they could graduate, but allowed local districts to decide whether that should entail passing the Pennsylvania System of School Assessment math and reading tests or alternative tests in the subjects. Zahorchak said, "I think it's a real disservice to graduate a student who's fundamentally not at the standard level." However, Zahorchak also said students should be given alternative ways to demonstrate they are ready for college or the work force besides exams.

As secretary, Zahorchak implemented state funding for pre-kindergarten and full-day kindergarten, training for principals, and easier ways to transfer college credits from one school to another. He has managed $200 million in Accountability Block Grants that were used for tutoring, math and literacy coaching, and led the development of Pennsylvania Inspired Leadership, a legislative initiative to develop and support educational leaders in the state. In 2008, Rendell and Zahorchak unveiled the first new school funding formula in about two decades, which set out to more fair than previous formulas and better meet the specific needs of individual school districts. The formula would give more money to districts with large numbers of children living in poverty. Other factors considered under the formula were cost of living, district size, enrollment growth and the number of students learning to speak English. The formula originally called for increasing Pennsylvania education spending by $2.6 billion over the next six years, starting with an additional $291 million in 2008–09, although the final budget passed by the state reduced that expenditure to $274 million.

Zahorchak spearheaded the establishment of the Keystone Exams, state-created math, science and social studies tests that high school students would be required to pass a majority of in order to graduate. The measure was met with criticism by the Pennsylvania School Boards Association and others who felt the plan would be expensive and would undermine local school boards' authority to set graduation requirements. The PSBA agreed to support the Keystone Exams under a compromise that schools might not have to give the tests if their own final exams are rigorous enough. The Keystone Exams were approved in 2009 and will first take effect starting with the class of 2015. Zahorchak also established the state's Standards Aligned System, which created a standardized set of diagnostic tests and curriculum guides for local school districts. The standards were aligned to six components: a curriculum framework, assessment systems, best teaching practices, emotional support practices, proven research resources and best interventions for accommodations for children who struggle. Within two years, most public school districts within Pennsylvania were using Standards Aligned System in some form.

In December 2009, Zahorchak received an honorary doctor of laws degree from Indiana University of Pennsylvania, making him one of about only 50 people to receive the distinction. In 2010, Zahorchak helped lead the application for federal funding through Race to the Top, a competitive grant program that encourages innovation and reform throughout public education. Zahorchak said the plan he drafted would double the number of students meeting math and reading proficiency targets by 2014. About 120 school districts and 59 charter schools representing roughly 650,000 students signed on for the application, which could have brought the state $400 million. However, Pennsylvania was not included among the states to receive money in the first round of Race to the Top, where funds were awarded only to Delaware and Tennessee for their reform measures. Zahorchak said feedback from the rejected application would be used to strengthen another application in the second round.

Zahorchak announced he would resign as education secretary on May 7, 2010. His decision to leave was spurred by the pending end of the Rendell administration, with the governor leaving the office by January 2011. At the time of his departure, there were no public school districts in the state with more than half of their students testing below basic levels in state standardized tests, although 14 districts fit that criterion before Zahorchak took the job.

== Post-Secretary career ==
Zahorchak was unanimously selected to be superintendent of the Allentown School District in Allentown, Pennsylvania on April 22, 2010. His five-year contract began on July 1, 2010, with a starting yearly salary of $195,000. Zahorchak is the 16th superintendent of the district, which serves about 18,300 students and is the fourth largest public school district in Pennsylvania. He was chosen over four potential candidates, including former Harrisburg School District Superintendent Gerald Kohn, deputy superintendent of St. Louis Public Schools Carlinda Purcell and School District of Philadelphia Regional Superintendent Lucy D. Feria. The Allentown position was the only job Zahorchak sought as he considered leaving the Secretary of Education position.

Zahorchak said he plans to install a system that would provide regular updates to families on the academic performance of their children and push them toward tangible improvement goals. In response to recent student violence problems at the William Allen High School, Zahorchak identified one of his priorities as strengthening the district's code of conduct and citizenship programs. He also announced he would seek to replace retiring teachers with highly skilled minority candidates, and would create incentive programs to lure top students into teaching positions if they agreed to spend at least five years teaching in Allentown schools.

Shortly after it was announced that all four Allentown School District middle schools failed to meet PSSA standards in 2009-10, Zahorchak proposed a major overhaul that would effectively eliminate all the district's middle schools and change elementary schools to a kindergarten through eighth grade model. On August 26, 2010, the school board approved a study of the district's facilities which would look into that proposal, or an alternative of building a fifth middle school in East Allentown to reduce the district's middle school student population per building. The Morning Call said if approved, Zahorchak's proposal would be "the biggest overhaul of the city's educational landscape in 30 years".

On October 14, the Allentown School Board Education Committee signed off on Zahorchak's proposed five-year leadership and curriculum plans "Pathways to Success". The full board will determine whether to adopt it on October 28. Among the elements of the plan were social supports to help students transition from one grade level to the next, as well as the introduction to students of college information and career choices as early as elementary school, to ensure they understand their options after high school. The plan would also align programs and curricula across the district, establish a network to provide students better access to college courses and tutoring, and a push for more students to take advanced placement courses. Additionally, the plan would require high schoolers to pass mandatory, internationally recognized exit exams to graduate from high school.

The committee signed off on all of Zahorchak's proposals except for his call to remove four principals in exchange for up to $15 million in federal grants that mandate leadership or staff changes as a condition for receiving the money. Zahorchak proposed transferring the principals from the Allen and Dieruff high schools, Central Elementary and Harrison-Morton Middle School to the district's nonprofit foundation, then use the federal grant money to open a special school for advanced placement and honors students. The committee did not vote or comment on the matter on October 14. Zahorchak said he still planned to pursue the plan but apologized for speaking to the media about it on October 12 before discussing it with the district and staff, a move that caused angst among the staff and some members of the public.

On March 24, Zahorchak's proposal for district wide reform will be put before the Allentown School Board. The plan for reform is based primarily on financial expectations within the district. While the plan calls for the hiring of new teachers who will not be full-time and not on district payroll, it also calls for the termination of 300+ teachers. Staff members from each of the Allentown School District's schools will attend the meeting in order to overhaul the plan.

By July 1, 2011, the school board approved a budget that saw less than 60 professionals educators being furloughed. The budget continued to endorse the Pathways to Success Program.

On August 17, 2011, Zahorchak resigned as superintendent and was retained as Director of Strategic Initiatives. Cost savings was cited by the ASD board as the reason for the resignation. Other issues with Zahorchak's management style, initiatives, and actions were also reported as contributing to the mutually accepted resignation.
