= Greater Johnstown School District =

School district in Pennsylvania

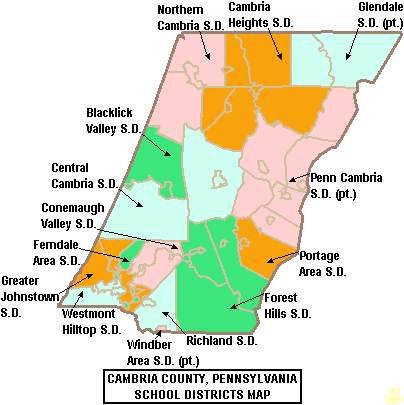

Address
- 1091 Broad Street Johnstown, Cambria County, Pennsylvania, 15906-2437; United States of America

Other information
- Website: https://www.gjsd.net/

The Greater Johnstown School District is a public school district which is located in Cambria County, Pennsylvania. The district serves: the City of Johnstown, parts of Geistown Borough and the townships of Lower Yoder, Stonycreek, and West Taylor. It is one of the five hundred public school districts of Pennsylvania.

== Geography and demographics ==
The Greater Johnstown School District encompasses approximately 23 square miles (60 km^{2}). According to 2000 federal census data, it served a resident population of 33,566. By 2010, the district's population declined to 27,641 people.

The educational attainment levels for the school district population (twenty-five years of age or older) were 85.4% high school graduates and 13.2% college graduates.

According to the Pennsylvania Budget and Policy Center, 79.7% of the district's pupils lived at 185% or below the Federal Poverty Level as shown by their eligibility for the federal free or reduced price school meal programs in 2012.

In 2009, the district residents’ per capita income was $14,222, while the median family income was $30,347. In the Commonwealth, the median family income was $49,501 and the United States median family income was $49,445, in 2010. In Cambria County, the median household income was $39,574. By 2013, the median household income in the United States rose to $52,100.

According to Greater Johnstown School District officials, the district provided basic educational services to 3,212 pupils in 2009. It employed: 232 teachers, 99 full-time and part-time support personnel, and nineteen (19) administrators during the 2009–10 school year. The district received $23 million in state funding in the 2009–10 school year. In school year 2007–08, the Greater Johnstown School District reported having 3,193 pupils. It employed: 244 teachers, 99 full-time and part-time support personnel, and 12 administrators. In 2025, Alicia D. Koster was selected by the Board of Education to become the new superintendent of the Greater Johnstown School District, effective August 10, 2025. Greater Johnstown School District received more than $23.3 million in state funding in school year 2007–08.

High school students may choose to attend Greater Johnstown Career and Technology Center for training in the construction and mechanical trades; culinary arts, allied health careers, cosmetology, and graphic design. The Appalachia Intermediate Unit IU8 provides the district with a wide variety of services like specialized education for disabled students and hearing, background checks for employees, state mandated recognizing and reporting child abuse training, speech and visual disability services and professional development for staff and faculty.

== Schools ==
The district operates five schools.

- Johnstown Elementary School - Formerly West Side Elementary School. Originally constructed as the Westwood School in 1959, West Side was renovated in 1991. It is located in the Westwood section of Lower Yoder Township. In 2017, the district merged East Side Elementary School with West Side to form Johnstown Elementary School.
- Johnstown Middle School - Located in the Hornerstown section of Johnstown in the former East Side Elementary School building. Built in 1969, renovated in 1977, and renovated again in 1996 to close in "open classrooms"
- Johnstown High School - Located in the Moxham section of Johnstown. The school has been recently renovated.
- Greater Johnstown School District's Cyber Academy opened July 2014
- Morrell Neighborhood Preschool - Located in the Cambria City section of Johnstown

== Extracurriculars ==
Greater Johnstown School District offers a wide variety of clubs, activities and an extensive, publicly funded sports program.

== Sport ==
The District funds:

Varsity

Boys

- Baseball - AAA
- Basketball- AAA
- Ice hockey - AA
- Cross country - AA
- Football - AAA
- Soccer & JV football - AA
- Tennis - AA
- Track and field - AA
- Wrestling - AA

Girls

- Basketball - AA
- Cheer - AAAA
- Soccer - AA
- Softball - AAA
- Tennis - AA
- Track and field - AAA
- Volleyball - AA

Middle school sports

Boys

- Baseball
- Basketball
- Football - 7th grade and 8th grade
- Soccer
- Wrestling

Girls

- Basketball
- Soccer
- Softball
- Volleyball

- PeeWee football is also provided

According to PIAA directory July 2015
