= Westwood, Pennsylvania =

Westwood, Pennsylvania may refer to:

- Westwood, Cambria County, Pennsylvania, a census-designated place
- Westwood, Chester County, Pennsylvania, a census-designated place
- Westwood (Pittsburgh), a neighborhood
