= Richland School District (Cambria County, Pennsylvania) =

School district in Pennsylvania

Coordinates: 40.26874°N 78.83988°W

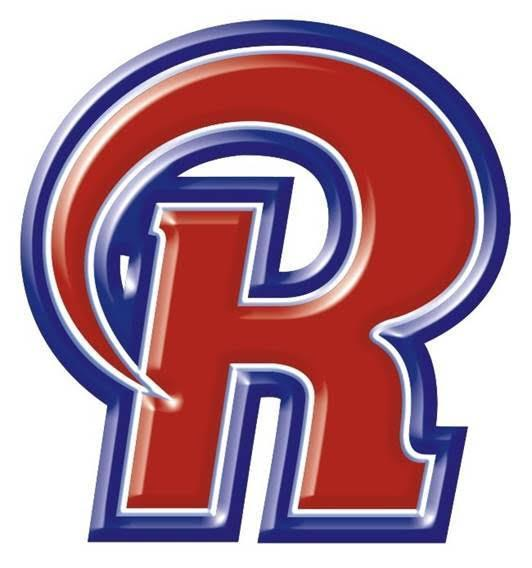

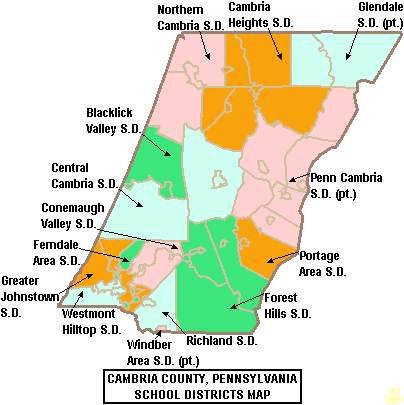

Address
- 1 Academic Avenue, Suite 200 Johnstown, Cambria County, Pennsylvania, 15904; United States

District information
- Motto: “A student is never an interruption of our work ~ he or she is the purpose of our work.”
- Established: 1917; 109 years ago

Students and staff
- Student–teacher ratio: 15:1
- District mascot: Ram
- Colors: Red, white, and blue

Other information
- Website: richlandsd.com

The Richland School District is a small, rural, public school district in Cambria County, Pennsylvania. It serves the borough of Geistown and the Township of Richland. It encompasses approximately 22 square miles. According to 2010 federal census data, the district served a resident population of 14,902 people. The educational attainment levels for the school district population (25 years old and over) were 90% high school graduates and 26.8% college graduates. The district is one of the 500 public school districts of Pennsylvania.

According to the Pennsylvania Budget and Policy Center, 23.6% of the district's pupils lived at 185% or below the Federal Poverty Level as shown by their eligibility for the federal free or reduced price school meal programs in 2012. In 2009 the Richland School District residents' per capita income was $18,883, while the median family income was $45,694. In the Commonwealth, the median family income was $49,501 and the United States median family income was $49,445, in 2010. In Cambria County, the median household income was $39,574. By 2013, the median household income in the United States rose to $52,100. In 2014, the median household income in the USA was $53,700.

The Richland School District operates two schools: Richland Elementary School (Grades K–6) and Richland Senior High School (Grades 7–12). High school students may choose to attend Greater Johnstown Career and Technology Center for training in the construction and mechanical trades. The Appalachia Intermediate Unit IU8 provides the district with a wide variety of services like specialized education for disabled students and hearing, background checks for employees, state mandated recognizing and reporting child abuse training, speech and visual disability services and professional development for staff and faculty.

== History ==
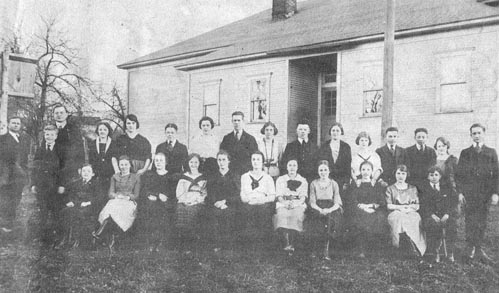
The original wooden schoolhouse c. 1920

Richland School District was established in 1917 after a wooden schoolhouse was built in Geistown. The school was small. A permanent brick building was built in 1923 along the same road as the original wooden structure.

The 1923 brick building continued to function as a senior high school until 1954 when a new high school was completed on Scalp Avenue. Through the 1960s, the district went through rapid expansion. Two elementary school and a middle schools were all built within a decade of each other near Theatre Drive. The district continued its expansion when in 1970, it completed an even newer high school for students. During this time, the 1923 building and 1954 building were being used for lower grades.

In 2003, the roof collapsed in the Richland Middle School. This caused severe structural damage to the school. It was decided that a new, junior-senior high school would be built, which would encompass grades 7 to 12. In the meantime, middle school-aged students were instead taught in the Rachel Hill building near the elementary school. The new school began construction in 2006 but was not finished until 2007. In that same year, Penn Highlands Community College finished a renovation project on the 1970 senior high and began to use it as their own campus the following year.

The old elementary school, Rachel Hill, which was opened in 1960, was demolished in 2020. It had been vacant since 2007, when it was briefly used as a middle school, but before that it had been closed since 1998.

During the Coronavirus Pandemic in 2020, Richland School District shut down in mid-March, and stayed closed for the remainder of the 2019–2020 school year. During the following school year, Richland briefly went to remote learning, then later to a hybrid remote-physical model as COVID-19 cases spiked during the 2020 holiday season. For the 2021–2022 school year, Richland followed strict mask mandates from the state government until February 2022, when the board voted to make face coverings optional.

== Extracurriculars ==
The Richland School District offers a wide variety of clubs, activities and an extensive sports program.

=== Sports ===
The district provides:

Varsity

Boys

- Baseball - AA
- Basketball- AA
- Cross country - A
- Football - AA
- Golf - AA
- Indoor track and field - AAAA
- Soccer - A
- Swimming and diving - AA
- Tennis - AA
- Track and field - AA
- Wrestling - AA

Girls

- Basketball - AA
- Cheerleading - AAAA
- Cross country - A
- Indoor track and field - AAAA
- Soccer - A
- Softball - AA
- Swimming and diving - AAA
- Tennis - AAA
- Track and field - AA
- Volleyball - AA

Junior high school sports

Boys

- Basketball
- Cross country
- Football
- Soccer
- Track and field
- Wrestling

Girls

- Basketball
- Cross country
- Soccer
- Track and field
- Volleyball

According to PIAA directory July 2015
