= Stonycreek Township, Pennsylvania =

Stonycreek Township is the name of some places in the U.S. state of Pennsylvania:

- Stonycreek Township, Cambria County, Pennsylvania
- Stonycreek Township, Somerset County, Pennsylvania
