= Carole Smith =

American education administrator

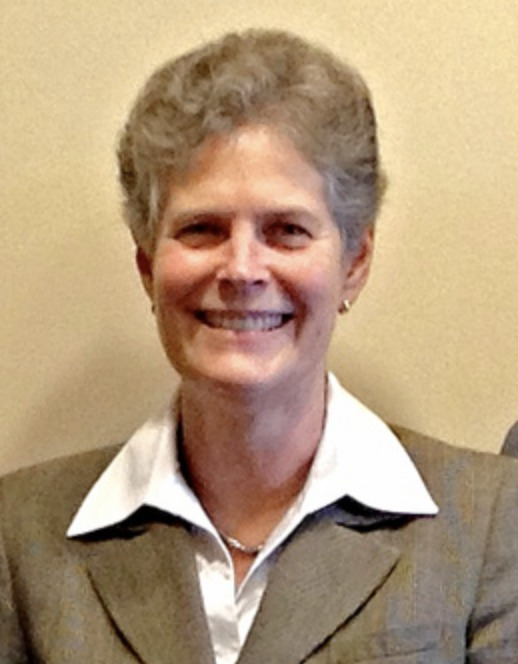
- Smith in 2012

Superintendent of Portland Public Schools
- In office 2007–2016
- Preceded by: Vicki Phillips
- Succeeded by: Robert McKean

Personal details
- Born: August 1954 (age 72)

Carole Smith (born August 1954) is an education administrator in Portland, Oregon, who was the Superintendent of Portland Public Schools from 2007 until 2016.

== Earlier Life ==
Smith served as Executive Director of Open Meadows School in Portland, Oregon from 1982 to 2005.

== Time as Superintendent ==
Smith was hired as Superintendent of Portland Public Schools in 2007, to replace Vicki Phillips.

For the first three years of her time as Superintendent, Smith and the School Board had set forth three Student Achievement targets; which were to increase the number of third graders exceeding State reading standards, the number of seventh graders passing the state writing test, and the number of Freshmen passing the expected number of classes, all by at least five percent. While third graders' and freshmen's scores improved in these respective areas, none of the three goals were met. Despite that, in October 2010, Smith received a highly positive report on her first three years, allowing her to continue her career as Superintendent.

In 2015, Smith shifted the start of the school year from the day after Labor Day to the week before, citing concerns that Portland Public Schools has one of the shortest school years in the United States. Soon after her announcement, the nearby school districts in Lake Oswego, West Linn School District, and Forest Grove changed their schedules similarly.

In March 2016, Smith announced a number of changes to school boundaries, due to concerns of overcrowding. In the same month, she donated an empty school building to the City for use as a homeless shelter, in return for free TriMet bus passes for high school students.

== Retirement ==
In June 2016, Smith announced that she would be stepping down from the role of Superintendent after just one more year. However, on July 18, 2016, she announced that she would be stepping down immediately. Her announcement came shortly after a report had been released on Portland Public Schools' lead testing after the school board released a damning report showing how Portland Public Schools dropped the ball on testing water for lead, fixing problems that were found and notifying the public of test results. She was required to give the district 90 days notice before stepping down, although she had at least 90 days of unused vacation days, and in effect retired immediately. Smith denied having known about elevated lead levels until testing began in late May 2016.
