= Pennsylvania Department of Education =

Agency overview
- Jurisdiction: State government of Pennsylvania
- Headquarters: 607 South Dr., Harrisburg, Pennsylvania, U.S.
- Employees: 500 (2019)
- Agency executive: Carrie Rowe, Secretary of Education (acting)
- Website: www.education.pa.gov

The Pennsylvania Department of Education is the executive department of the state charged with publicly funded preschool, K-12 and adult educational budgeting, management and guidelines. As the state education agency, its activities are directed by the governor appointed Pennsylvania's Secretary of Education. The agency is headquartered at 333 Market Street in Harrisburg.

The Pennsylvania Department of Education oversees 500 public school districts of Pennsylvania, over 170 public charter schools (2019), Career and Technology Centers/Vocational Technical schools, 29 Intermediate Units, the education of youth in State Juvenile Correctional Institutions, and publicly funded preschools (Head Start and PreK Counts Keystone Stars). In 2019, the Pennsylvania Department of Education employs approximately 500 persons.

The agency maintains a database of all education institutions in the Commonwealth with associated data. These entities include school districts and their schools, intermediate units, area vocational technical schools, charter schools, nonpublic and private schools, higher education institutions and more.

== History ==
Following passage and signing of the Free School Law on April 1, 1834, the Secretary of the Commonwealth acted as head of the Common School System until 1837 when a separate Department of Schools was created with a Superintendent of Common Schools as its chief officer. In 1873, the title was changed to Superintendent of Public Instruction, and greater responsibilities were assigned to that official and to the department. In 1969, the name of the Department of Public Instruction was changed to the Department of Education, with the title of Superintendent of Public Instruction changed to the Secretary of Education. It previously ran the Pennsylvania State Board of Censors.

== Purpose ==
The department has broad discretionary powers in both the development and administration of educational policies which enhance the educational experience and quality in Pennsylvania. The department also works as an ongoing study of the educational process within the state, conducting studies and programs designed to evaluate specific needs or qualities of the system. In doing so, the Pennsylvania Department of Education will recommend changes and improvements to the Governor, the Board of Education, and the General Assembly.

The Pennsylvania Department of Education also oversees policies of public libraries, academic libraries, and the State Library of Pennsylvania located in Harrisburg. It provides policy of equal opportunity in the educational system, with special regard to nonpublic education and state policy of education. It is within the Pennsylvania Department of Education's mission to collaborate with other state educational departments in an effort to create a cohesive and dynamic learning environment.

== Offices and sub groups ==
The Pennsylvania Department of Education operates several offices and participates in many state related agencies/Boards.

- Office of Elementary and Secondary Education
- Office of Postsecondary and Higher Education
- Office of Child Development and Early Learning (OCDEL) in association with the Pennsylvania Department of Human Services
- Office of Commonwealth Libraries
- State Board of Education
- Professional Standards and Practices Commission
- Office of Food and Nutrition Programs
- Special Education Advisory Panel
- State Boards of Private Schools

== Power Library ==
Power Library is the online portal to Pennsylvania libraries, a service of the Office of Commonwealth Libraries, Pennsylvania Department of Education.

== Secretaries of Education ==
Name	Dates served	Appointed by
David Kurtzman	1969–1971	Raymond P. Shafer
John Pittenger	1972–1976	Milton Shapp
Robert N. Hendershot	1977	Milton Shapp
Caryl M. Kline	1977–1979	Milton Shapp
Robert G. Scanlon	1979–1983	Dick Thornburgh
Robert C. Wilburn	1983–1984	Dick Thornburgh
Margaret A. Smith	1984–1986	Dick Thornburgh
D. Kay Wright (Acting)	1986–1987	Dick Thornburgh
William Logan (Acting)	1987	Bob Casey Sr.
Thomas K. Gilhool	1987–1989	Bob Casey Sr.
Carl Dellmuth	1989	Bob Casey Sr.
Donald Carroll	1989–1995	Bob Casey Sr.
Jane Carroll	1995	Tom Ridge
Eugene W. Hickok	1995–2001	Tom Ridge
Charles Zogby	2001–2003	Tom Ridge
Thomas Winters (Acting)	2003	Mark Schweiker
Vicki Phillips	2003–2004	Ed Rendell
Francis V. Barnes	2004–2005	Ed Rendell
Gerald Zahorchak	2005–2011	Ed Rendell
Thomas Gluck (Acting)	2010	Ed Rendell
Amy Morton (Acting)	2010–2011	Ed Rendell
Ronald Tomalis	2011–2013	Tom Corbett
William Harner (Acting)	2013	Tom Corbett
Carolyn Dumaresq (Acting)	2013–2015	Tom Corbett
Pedro Rivera	2015–2020	Tom Wolf
Noe Ortega (Acting)	2020–2022	Tom Wolf
Eric Hagarty (Acting)	2022–2023	Tom Wolf
Khalid Mumin	2023–2024	Josh Shapiro
Angela Fitterer (Acting)	2024–2025	Josh Shapiro
Carrie Rowe (Acting)	2025–present	Josh Shapiro

== See also ==
- List of Pennsylvania state agencies
- State education agency
