= Upper Yoder Township Authority =

- UYTA

Sewage treatment authority overview
- Type: sewage treatment authority
- Jurisdiction: Upper Yoder Township, Cambria County, Pennsylvania
- Headquarters: 110 Sunray Drive; Johnstown, Pennsylvania 15905

Map
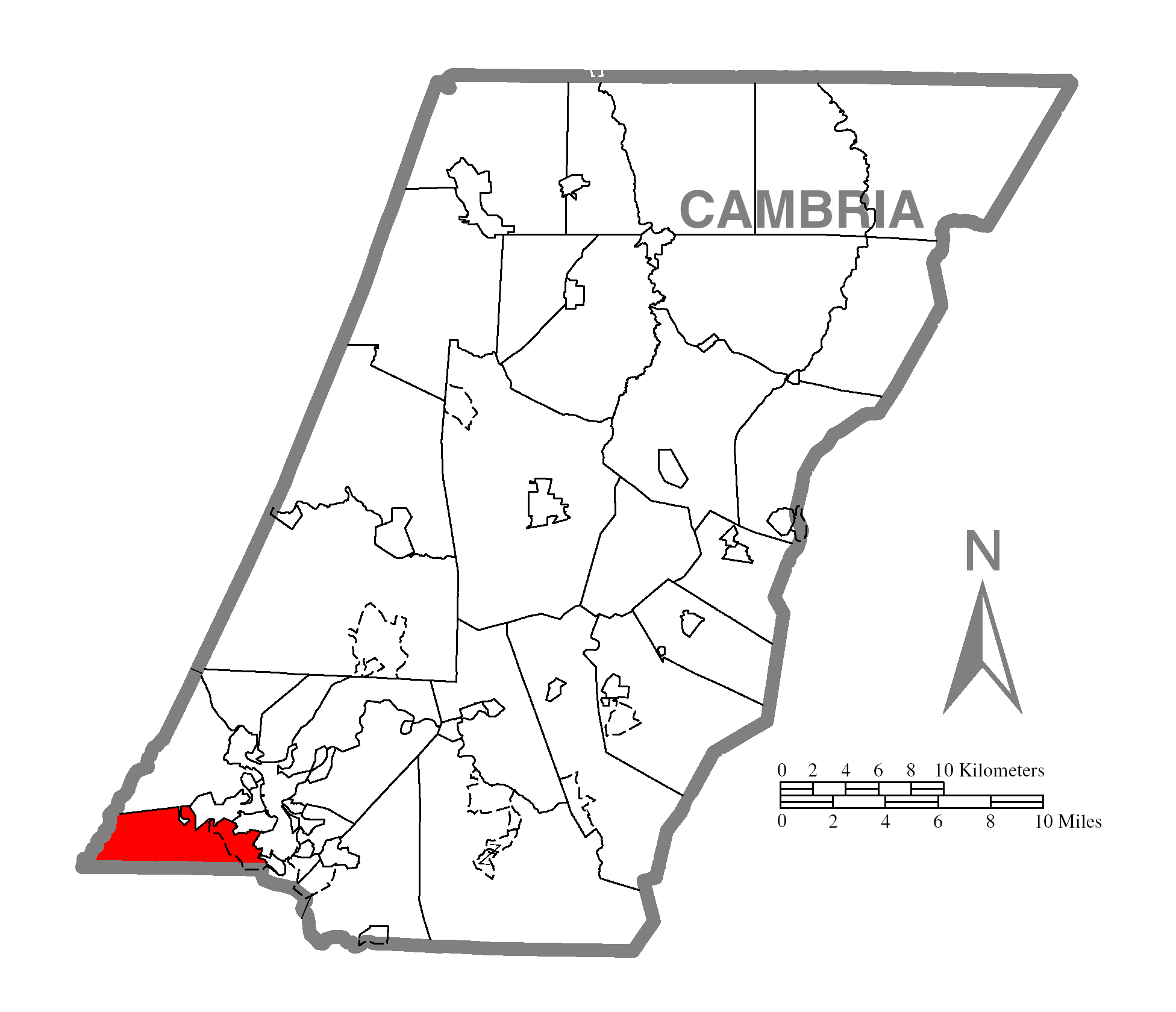
- Upper Yoder Township in Cambria County, PA (the jurisdiction of UYTA)

The Upper Yoder Township Authority was formed under the terms of the Municipality Authorities Act of 1945, to provide a sewage collection system in the township. UYTA received its charter from the Commonwealth on June 21, 1955.

== Construction of the Collection System ==
The original sanitary sewer system was constructed in three project phases in the early 1950s through the latter part of the 1960s throughout Upper Yoder Township. The collected waste water is treated at the Dornick Point Sewage Treatment Plant on the Western edge of Johnstown city limits.

== Sewage Authority ==
The authority board members are elected to five-year terms, all the terms are staggered so there is never an inexperienced authority board of directors

== System Fees ==
As of 2009, a tap-in fee to the sanitary sewer system cost $1,200.00 with an inspection fee of $50.00. Customers pay monthly or quarterly fees to the UTYA for transporting waste to the plant at Dornick Point, as well as to the Johnstown Regional Sewage for treatment of waste.

== See also ==
- List of municipal authorities in Cambria County, Pennsylvania
- Johnstown Redevelopment Authority
