= Riverside, Cambria County, Pennsylvania =

Unincorporated community in Pennsylvania, US

- Census-designated place
- Location in Pennsylvania Riverside (the United States)
- Coordinates: 40°17′05″N 78°55′16″W
- Country: United States
- State: Pennsylvania
- County: Cambria
- Township: Stonycreek

Area
  - Total: 0.13 sq mi (0.34 km^{2})
  - Land: 0.12 sq mi (0.30 km^{2})
  - Water: 0.015 sq mi (0.04 km^{2})
- Elevation: 1,230 ft (370 m)

Population (2020)
  - Total: 319
  - Density: 2,745.7/sq mi (1,060.14/km^{2})
- Time zone: UTC-5 (Eastern (EST))
  - Summer (DST): UTC-4 (EDT)
- FIPS code: 42-65088
- GNIS feature ID: 1185136

Riverside is an unincorporated community and census-designated place in Stonycreek Township, Cambria County, Pennsylvania, United States. It is located just to the south of the city of Johnstown inside a bend formed by the Stonycreek River. As of the 2010 census, the population of Riverside was 381.

== Demographics ==
Historical population
Census	Pop.	Note	%±
2020	319		—
U.S. Decennial Census
