= Oakland, Cambria County, Pennsylvania =

Unincorporated community in Pennsylvania, US

- CDP
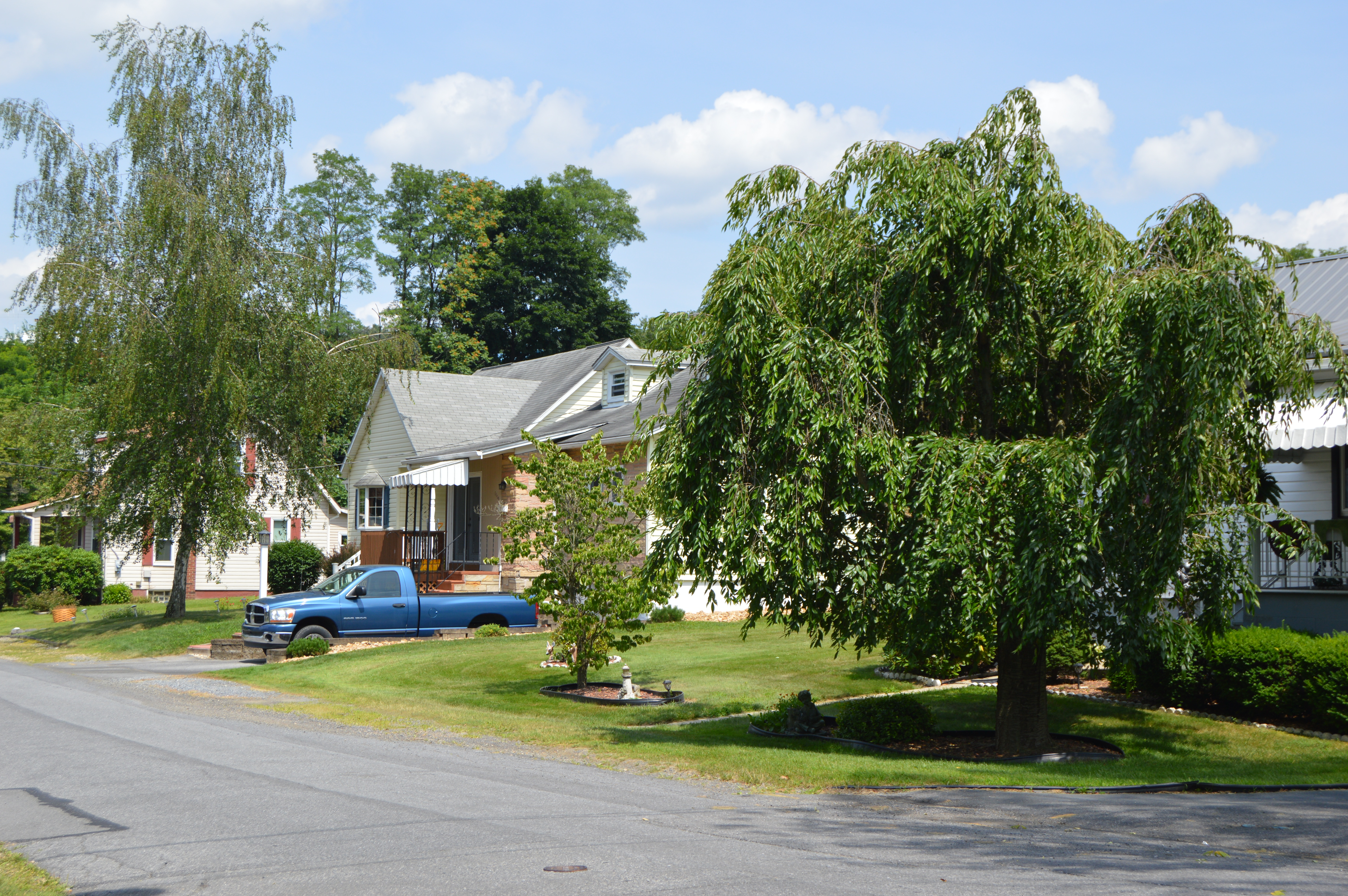
- Riffith Street neighborhood

- Location in Pennsylvania Oakland (the United States)
- Coordinates: 40°18′4″N 78°53′12″W
- Country: United States
- State: Pennsylvania
- County: Cambria
- Township: Stonycreek

Area
  - Total: 1.41 sq mi (3.64 km^{2})
  - Land: 1.41 sq mi (3.64 km^{2})
  - Water: 0 sq mi (0.00 km^{2})
- Elevation: 1,585 ft (483 m)

Population (2020)
  - Total: 1,481
  - Density: 1,052.5/sq mi (406.36/km^{2})
- Time zone: UTC-5 (Eastern (EST))
  - Summer (DST): UTC-4 (EDT)
- FIPS code: 42-55996
- GNIS feature ID: 1182821

Oakland is a census-designated place (CDP) in Stonycreek Township, Cambria County, Pennsylvania, United States. It is bordered on the west by the city of Johnstown and on the south by the boroughs of Lorain and Geistown. As of the 2010 census, the population of Oakland was 1,578.

== Demographics ==
Historical population
Census	Pop.	Note	%±
2020	1,481		—
U.S. Decennial Census
