= Khalid Mumin =

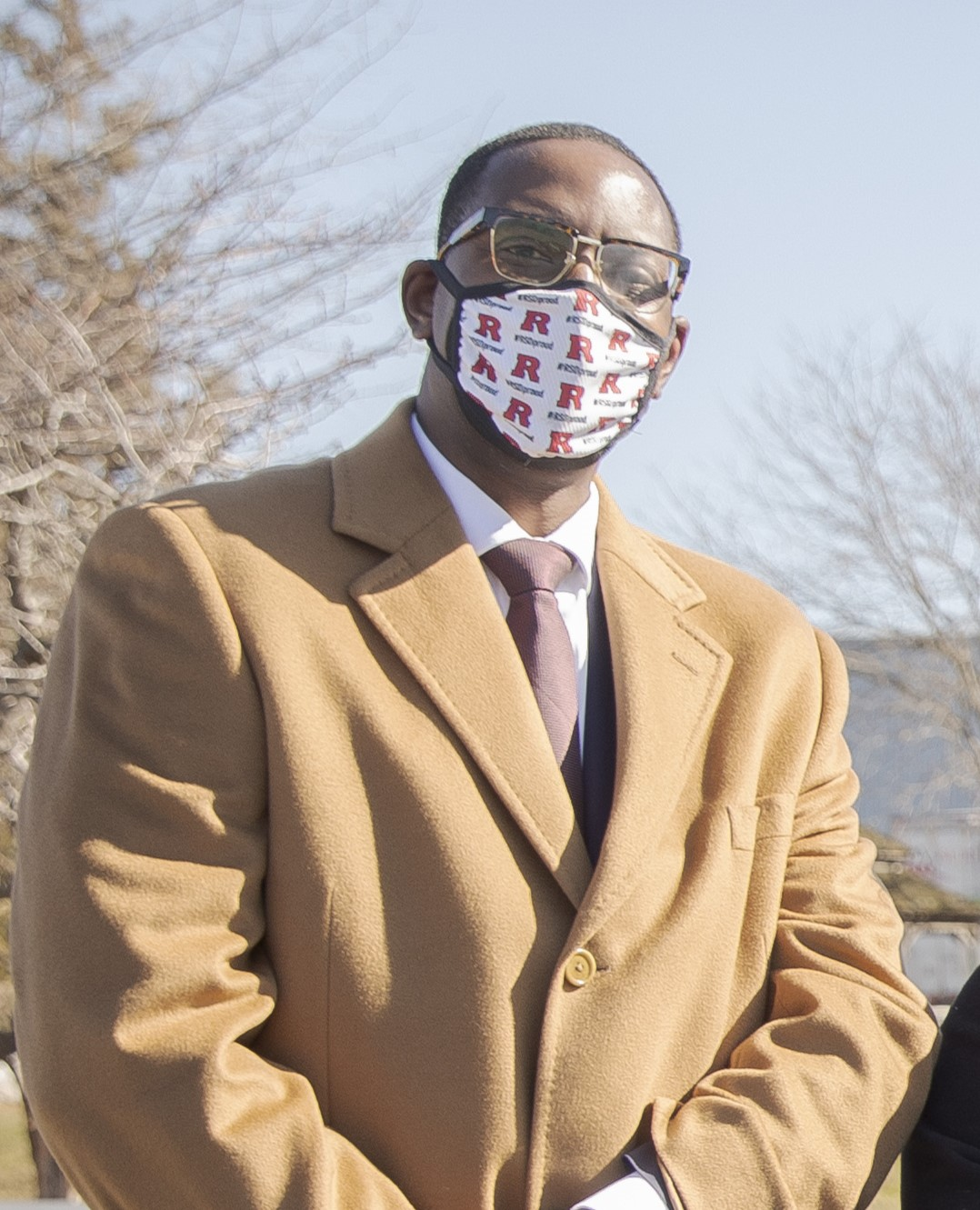
- Mumin in 2021

Secretary of Education of Pennsylvania
- In office January 17, 2023 – December 6, 2024 (Acting: January 17, 2023 – June 26, 2023)
- Governor: Josh Shapiro
- Preceded by: Eric Hagarty (acting)
- Succeeded by: Angela Fitterer (acting)

Personal details
- Spouse: Latrice
- Education: Northeastern Christian Junior College (AA); Shippensburg University (BA); Pennsylvania State University (MEd); University of Pennsylvania (EdD)

Khalid N. Mumin is an American educator who served as the Secretary of Education of Pennsylvania, serving from 2023 to 2024.

== Biography ==
Mumin is from Philadelphia. He earned a bachelor's degree from the Shippensburg University of Pennsylvania. He completed a master's degree from Pennsylvania State University and a doctorate from the University of Pennsylvania.

Mumin started his education career as a secondary English teacher at Scotland School for Veterans’ Children, in Scotland, Pennsylvania. He worked for six years in the Reading School District in Reading, Pennsylvania, including as the district's superintendent. He was previously the superintendent of the Lower Merion School District.

In January 2023, Mumin was nominated as Secretary of the Pennsylvania Department of Education by Governor Josh Shapiro. He was confirmed by the Pennsylvania State Senate on June 26.

On November 25, 2024, Mumin announced his resignation as Secretary of Education, which took effect December 6, 2024.

Mumin is married to Latrice Mumin, the superintendent of Chester Upland School District.

== Selected works ==
- Mumin, Khalid N. (2020). Problem Child: Leading Students Living in Poverty Towards Infinite Possibilities of Success. WGW Publishing Incorporated. ISBN 978-1-7324781-4-5.
