= Greater Johnstown High School =

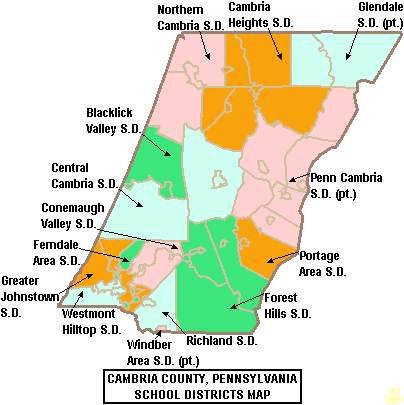

Location
- 222 Central Avenue; Johnstown, Pennsylvania 15902; United States; 40.303°N 78.91°W

Information
- Type: Public
- Established: 1895
- School district: Greater Johnstown S.D.
- Principal: William Cacciotti
- Grades: 8–12
- Enrollment: 856 (2023–2024)
- Language: English
- Colors: Black & Columbia blue
- Team name: Trojans
- Feeder schools: Greater Johnstown; Middle School
- Website: jhs.gjsd.net

Greater Johnstown High School is a public high school in the eastern United States, which is located in between the neighborhoods of Moxham, 8th Ward, and Hornerstown in Johnstown, Pennsylvania. It is the only high school operated by the Greater Johnstown School District.

During the 2023–2024 school year, enrollment was reported as 856 pupils in 8th through 12th grades.

== Extracurriculars ==
Greater Johnstown School District offers a wide variety of clubs, activities and an extensive, publicly funded sports program.

=== Competitive musical groups ===
Greater Johnstown High School's competitive groups compete on the NJA/TOB Circuit. The Marching Band and Indoor Percussion ensembles are directed by Eric Pfeil, and the Indoor/Outdoor Color Guard is directed by Jackie Willnecker.

- Marching Band: Group 2 Open Class
- Indoor Percussion: Scholastic Novice A Percussion
- Essay Performance Company: Scholastic A Guard

=== Athletics ===
Johnstown participates in high school athletics as a member of the Laurel Highlands Athletics Conference (LHAC). The school is located in Pennsylvania Interscholastic Athletic Association (PIAA) District 6.

=== Boys' athletics ===
- Baseball – Class AAAA
- Basketball – Class AAAAA
- Football – Class AAAA
- Soccer – Class AAA
- Track and field – Class AAA
- Wrestling – Class AAA

Johnstown appeared in the 2005 PIAA Class AAA Boys' Basketball state title game before falling to Steelton-Highspire High School. The Team also won the class AAA district 6 title in Football and Boys' Basketball in 2009.

=== Girls' athletics ===
- Basketball – Class AAAA
- Cheerleading – Class AAAAAA
- Soccer – Class AAA
- Softball – Class AAAA
- Track and field – Class AAA
- Volleyball – Class AAA

== Notable alumni and faculty ==
- Carroll Baker, actress
- Steve Ditko, Spider-Man comics co-creator
- Carlton Haselrig, former Pittsburgh Steelers Pro-Bowler and six-time NCAA collegiate wrestling champion
- Tim Kazurinsky, Saturday Night Live actor
- Gene Kelly, dancer and actor, choreographer for the Johnstown High School musicals.
- Geroy Simon, CFL all-time receptions leader
- LaRod Stephens-Howling, former Pittsburgh Steelers running back
- Eem Triplin, rapper
- Gerald Zahorchak, former Secretary of Education for the Commonwealth of Pennsylvania
