= Stonycreek Township, Cambria County, Pennsylvania =

Township in Pennsylvania, US

Coordinates: 40°17′50″N 78°53′31″W

- Township
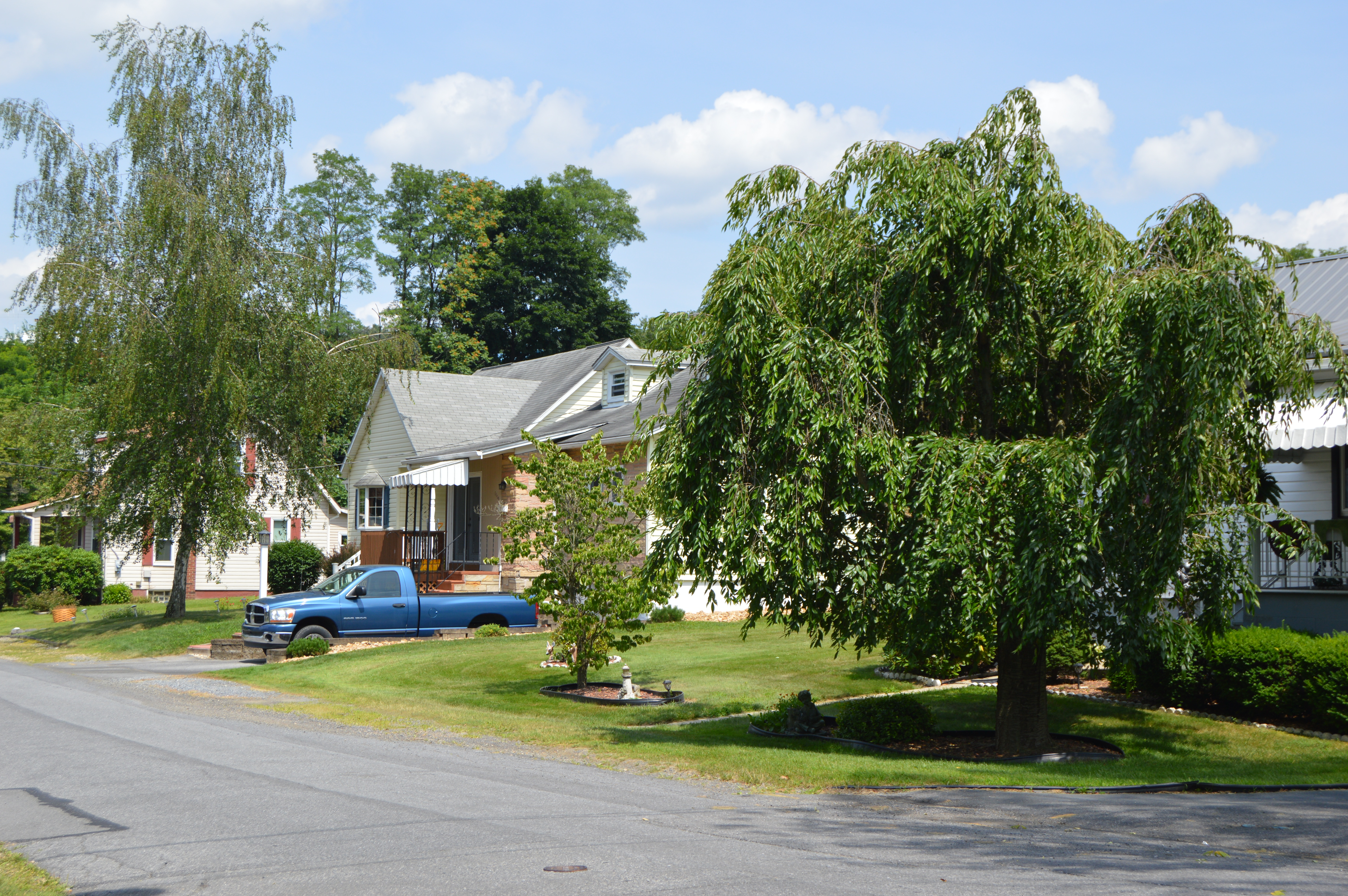
- Riffith Street in Oakland

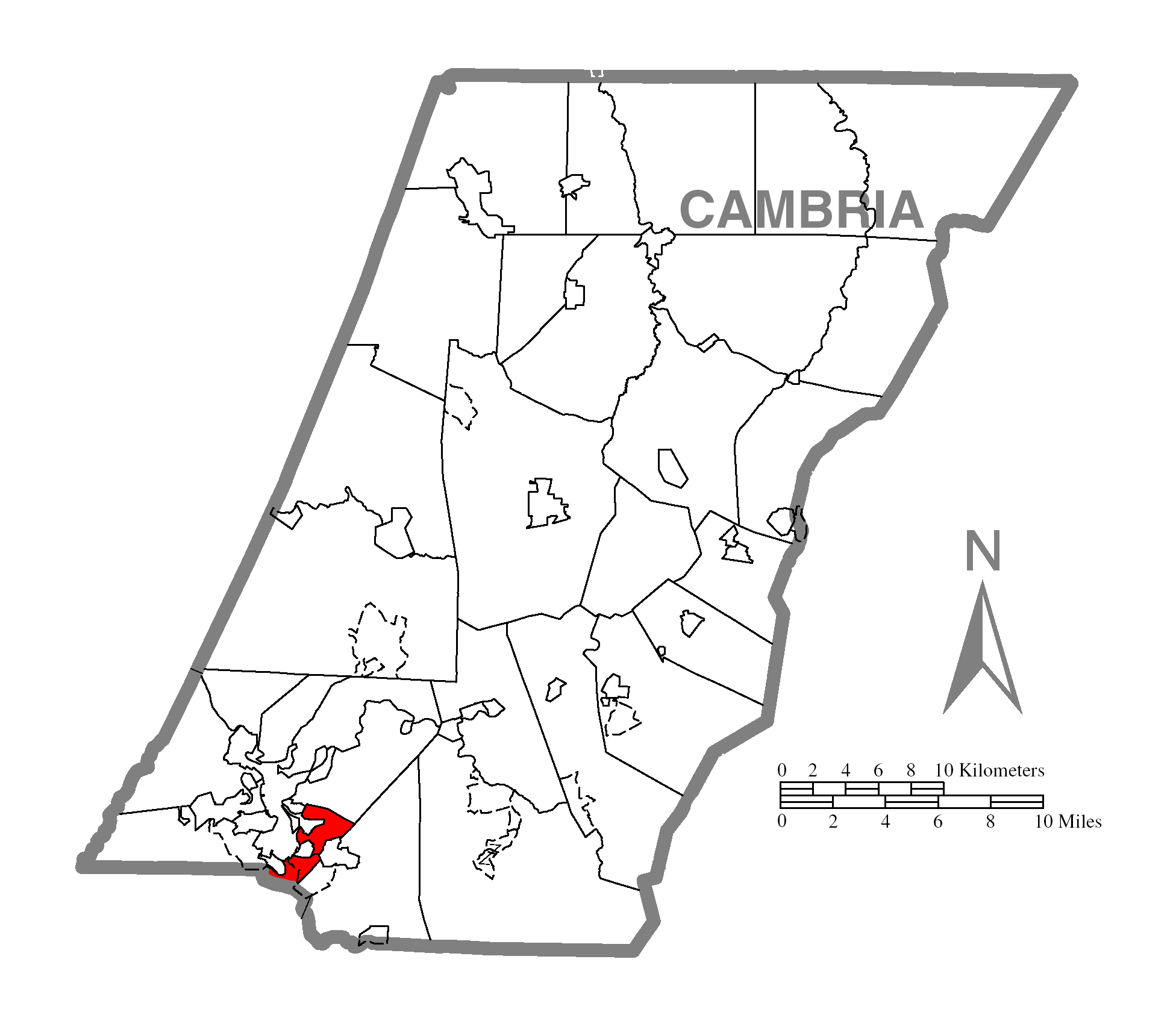
- Map of Cambria County, Pennsylvania highlighting Stonycreek Township

- Map of Cambria County, Pennsylvania
- Country: United States
- State: Pennsylvania
- County: Cambria
- Incorporated: 1876

Area
  - Total: 3.58 sq mi (9.28 km^{2})
  - Land: 3.49 sq mi (9.05 km^{2})
  - Water: 0.089 sq mi (0.23 km^{2})

Population (2010)
  - Total: 2,844
  - Estimate (2016): 2,686
  - Density: 768.6/sq mi (296.76/km^{2})
- Time zone: UTC-5 (Eastern (EST))
  - Summer (DST): UTC-4 (EDT)
- Area code: 814
- FIPS code: 42-021-74432
- Website: www.stonycreekccpa.gov

Stonycreek Township is a township in Cambria County, Pennsylvania, United States. The population was 2,844 at the 2010 census, down from 3,204 at the 2000 census. It is part of the Johnstown, Pennsylvania Metropolitan Statistical Area.

== Geography ==
The township is located in southwestern Cambria County and is bordered by the city of Johnstown to the northwest, Conemaugh Township to the north, and Richland Township to the southeast. Somerset County is to the south. The borough of Lorain is located near the center of the township, the borough of Geistown is on the southeastern border, and the borough of Daisytown touches the northwestern corner of the township. The boroughs are separate municipalities from the township. Three census-designated places occupy most of the township's area: Oakland is in the northern half of the township, part of Belmont is in the southern half, and Riverside is in the southwestern corner. The Stonycreek River forms the winding southwestern border of the township and flows northwestward to form the Conemaugh River in the center of Johnstown.

According to the United States Census Bureau, the township has a total area of 3.6 square miles (9.3 km^{2}), of which 3.5 square miles (9.1 km^{2}) is land and 0.08 square miles (0.2 km^{2}), or 2.46%, is water.

== Communities ==
=== Census-designated places ===
Census-designated places are geographical areas designated by the U.S. Census Bureau for the purposes of compiling demographic data. They are not actual jurisdictions under Pennsylvania law. Other unincorporated communities, such as villages, may be listed here as well.

- Oakland
- Riverside

== Demographics ==
Historical population
Census	Pop.	Note	%±
2000	3,204		—
2010	2,844		−11.2%
2016 (est.)	2,686		−5.6%
U.S. Decennial Census

As of the census of 2000, there were 3,204 people, 1,496 households, and 957 families residing in the township. The population density was 947.6 inhabitants per square mile (365.9/km^{2}). There were 1,599 housing units at an average density of 472.9 per square mile (182.6/km^{2}). The racial makeup of the township was 98.50% White, 0.66% African American, 0.16% Asian, 0.22% from other races, and 0.47% from two or more races. Hispanic or Latino of any race were 0.81% of the population.

There were 1,496 households, out of which 21.6% had children under the age of 18 living with them, 51.8% were married couples living together, 9.6% had a female householder with no husband present, and 36.0% were non-families. 31.6% of all households were made up of individuals, and 16.1% had someone living alone who was 65 years of age or older. The average household size was 2.14 and the average family size was 2.67.

In the township the population was spread out, with 17.0% under the age of 18, 7.0% from 18 to 24, 24.8% from 25 to 44, 25.1% from 45 to 64, and 26.2% who were 65 years of age or older. The median age was 46 years. For every 100 females, there were 86.4 males. For every 100 females age 18 and over, there were 84.6 males.

The median income for a household in the township was $29,745, and the median income for a family was $37,181. Males had a median income of $26,392 versus $21,865 for females. The per capita income for the township was $16,638. About 10.1% of families and 8.3% of the population were below the poverty line, including 17.0% of those under age 18 and 3.5% of those age 65 or over.
