= Richland High School (Pennsylvania) =

Coordinates: 40.2669°N 78.8402°W

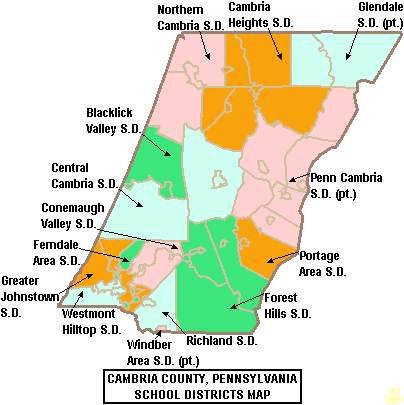

Location
- 319 Schoolhouse Road; Johnstown, Cambria County, Pennsylvania 15904; United States of America

Information
- School district: Richland School District
- Principal: Timothy Regan
- Faculty: 43 teachers (2012)
- Grades: 7-12
- Enrollment: 707 (2023–2024)
- Language: English
- Colors: Red, White, and Blue
- Team name: Rams
- Website: https://richlandsd.com/

Richland High School is a small, rural public high school located at One Academic Avenue, Johnstown, Pennsylvania. In the 2016–2017, Richland High School enrollment was reported as 762 pupils in 7th through 12th grades. Richland High School is the sole high school operated by Richland School District.

== Extracurriculars ==
The Richland School District offers a wide variety of clubs, activities and an extensive sports program.

=== Sports ===
The school provides the following:

Varsity

Boys

- Baseball - AA
- Basketball- AA
- Cross country - A
- Football - AA
- Golf - AA
- Indoor track and field - AAAA
- Soccer - A
- Swimming and diving - AA
- Tennis - AA
- Track and field - AA
- Wrestling - AA

Girls

- Basketball - AA
- Cheerleading - AAAA
- Cross country - A
- Indoor track and field - AAAA
- Soccer - A
- Softball - AA
- Swimming and diving - AAA
- Tennis - AAA
- Track and field - AA
- Volleyball - AA

Junior high school sports

Boys

- Basketball
- Cross country
- Football
- Soccer
- Track and field
- Wrestling

Girls

- Basketball
- Cross country
- Soccer
- Track and field
- Volleyball

According to PIAA directory July 2015

Richland school colors are Red and Blue and its mascot is the Ram. Its main rivals include Bishop McCort, Westmont Hilltop High School and Forest Hills High School.

== Notable alumni ==
- Ronald Machtley, politician
