= Richland Township, Cambria County, Pennsylvania =

Township in Pennsylvania, US

Coordinates: 40°16′43″N 78°51′28″W

- Township
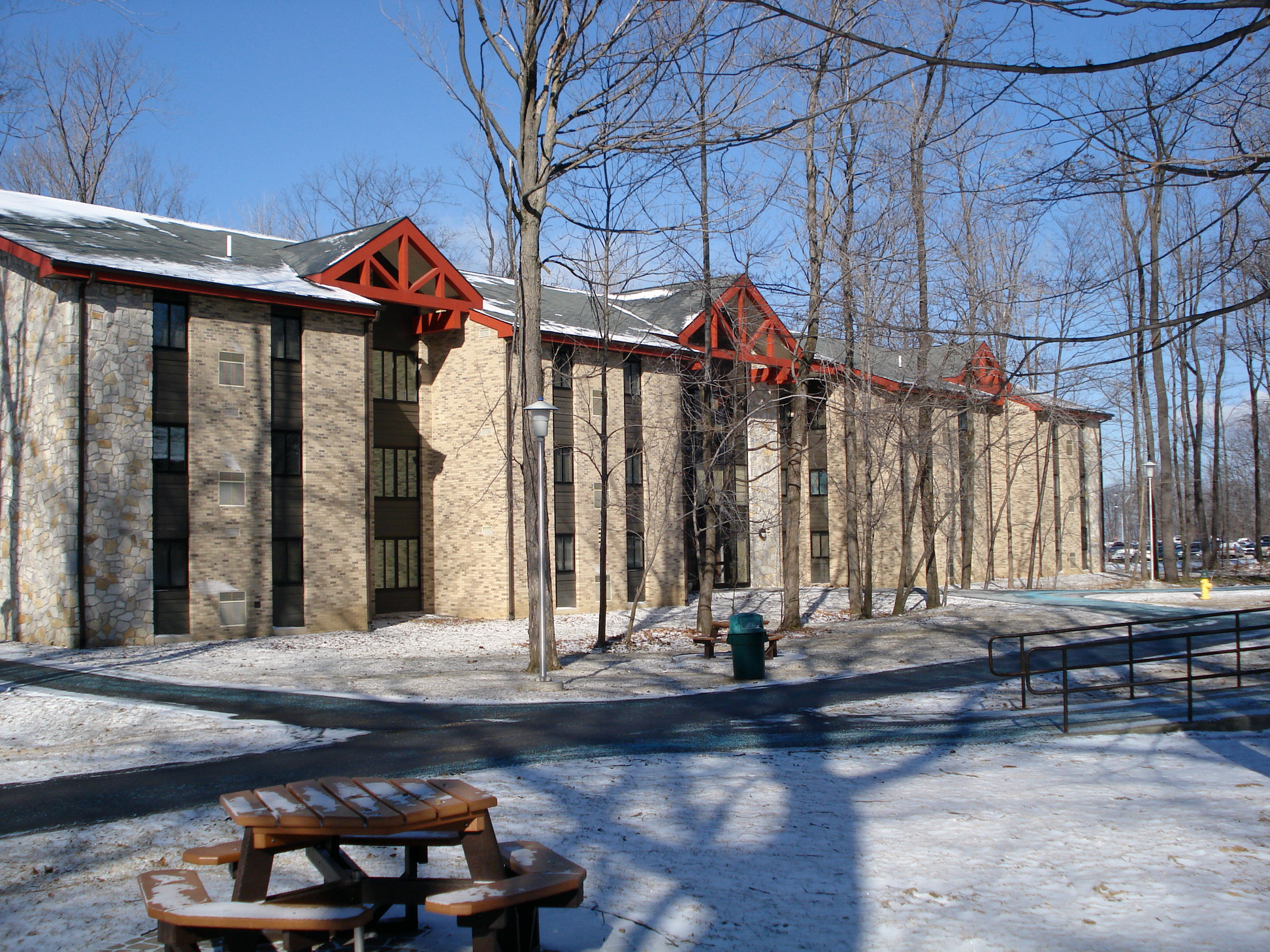
- Pitt-Johnstown campus

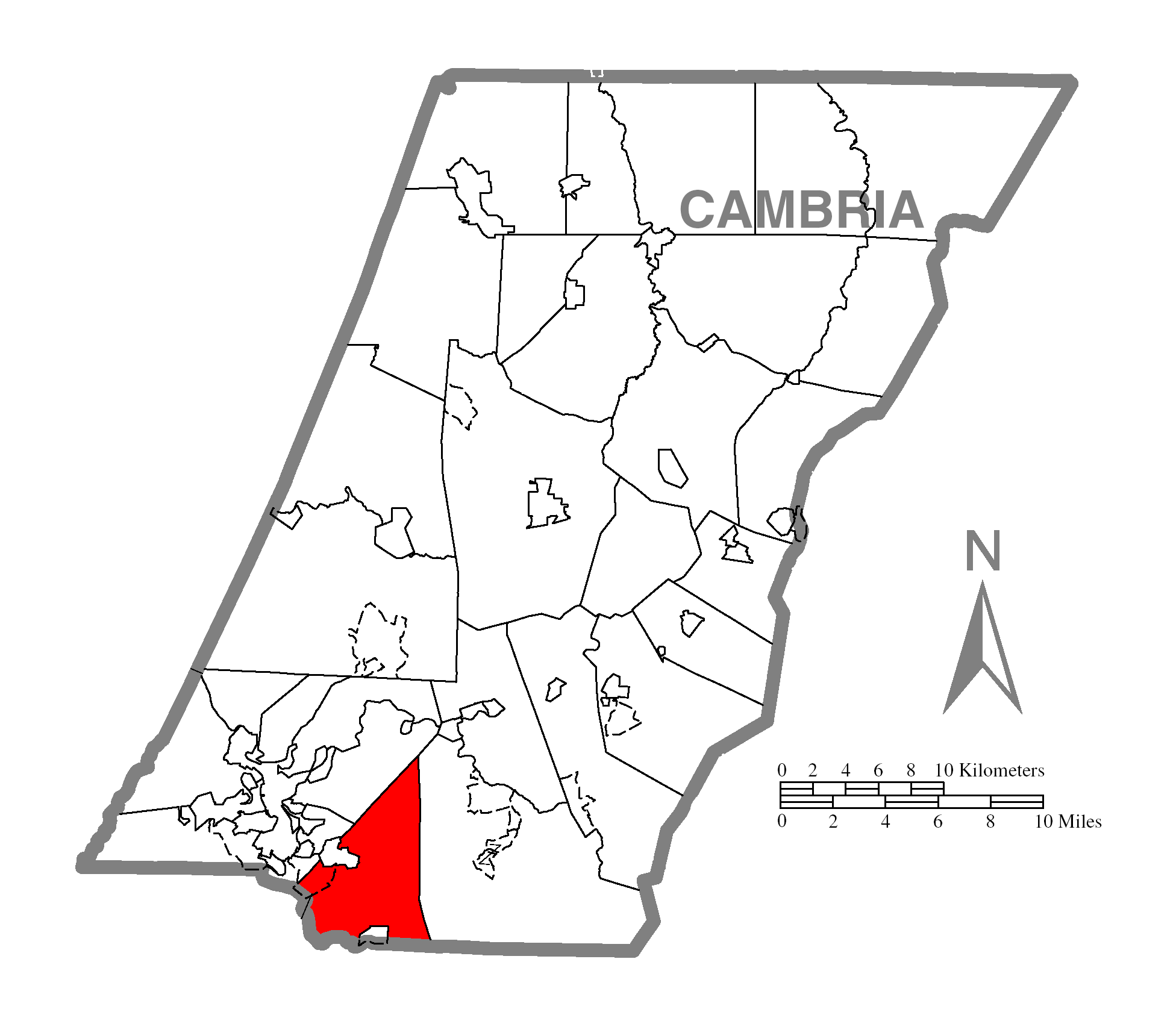
- Map of Cambria County, Pennsylvania highlighting Richland Township

- Map of Cambria County, Pennsylvania
- Country: United States
- State: Pennsylvania
- County: Cambria
- Settled: 1780
- Incorporated: 1833

Area
  - Total: 20.63 sq mi (53.42 km^{2})
  - Land: 20.59 sq mi (53.34 km^{2})
  - Water: 0.031 sq mi (0.08 km^{2})

Population (2010)
  - Total: 12,814
  - Estimate (2017): 12,675
  - Density: 594.6/sq mi (229.56/km^{2})
- Time zone: UTC-5 (Eastern (EST))
  - Summer (DST): UTC-4 (EDT)
- Area code: 814
- FIPS code: 42-021-64544
- Website: www.richlandtwp.com

Richland Township is a township in Cambria County, Pennsylvania, United States. The population was 12,814 at the 2010 census. It is part of the Johnstown, Pennsylvania Metropolitan Statistical Area.

== Geography ==
Richland Township is located in southwestern Cambria County and is bordered to the south by Somerset County. The borough of Geistown is along the northwestern edge of the township, and the borough of Scalp Level is on the township's southern border. The boroughs are separate from the township.

U.S. Route 219, a four-lane expressway, runs through the township, leading northeast 17 miles (27 km) to Ebensburg, the county seat, and southwest 25 miles (40 km) to Somerset. Pennsylvania Route 56, the Johnstown Expressway, leads 5 miles (8 km) from U.S. 219 northwest to the center of Johnstown.

According to the United States Census Bureau, the township has a total area of 20.6 square miles (53.4 km^{2}), of which 20.6 square miles (53.3 km^{2}) is land and 0.04 square miles (0.1 km^{2}), or 0.15%, is water. The Stonycreek River forms the southwestern border of the township and flows northwestward to form the Conemaugh River in the center of Johnstown.

Richland Township serves as the central retail area for Johnstown and its two-county metropolitan area. It is the location of The Johnstown Galleria, the largest mall in the area.

== Communities ==
=== Census-designated places ===
Census-designated places are geographical areas designated by the U.S. Census Bureau for the purposes of compiling demographic data. They are not actual jurisdictions under Pennsylvania law. Other unincorporated communities, such as villages, may be listed here as well.

- Belmont
- University of Pittsburgh (Johnstown)

=== Unincorporated communities ===
- Ingleside
- Kring
- Number 37
- Walsell

== Demographics ==
Historical population
Census	Pop.	Note	%±
2000	12,598		—
2010	12,814		1.7%
2017 (est.)	12,675		−1.1%
U.S. Decennial Census

As of the census of 2000, there were 12,598 people, 4,741 households, and 3,133 families residing in the township. The population density was 631.2 inhabitants per square mile (243.7/km^{2}). There were 4,994 housing units at an average density of 250.2 per square mile (96.6/km^{2}). The racial makeup of the township was 97.13% White, 0.78% African American, 0.10% Native American, 1.43% Asian, 0.13% from other races, and 0.44% from two or more races. Hispanic or Latino of any race were 0.52% of the population.

There were 4,741 households, out of which 24.1% had children under the age of 18 living with them, 56.8% were married couples living together, 7.4% had a female householder with no husband present, and 33.9% were non-families. 30.7% of all households were made up of individuals, and 17.6% had someone living alone who was 65 years of age or older. The average household size was 2.27 and the average family size was 2.84.

In the township the population was spread out, with 17.3% under the age of 18, 17.6% from 18 to 24, 20.5% from 25 to 44, 22.3% from 45 to 64, and 22.4% who were 65 years of age or older. The median age was 42 years. For every 100 females there were 85.6 males. For every 100 females age 18 and over, there were 81.8 males.

The median income for a household in the township was $36,280, and the median income for a family was $45,395. Males had a median income of $35,420 versus $25,039 for females. The per capita income for the township was $18,383. About 4.7% of families and 7.2% of the population were below the poverty line, including 10.9% of those under age 18 and 6.1% of those age 65 or over.

== Transportation ==
Johnstown–Cambria County Airport is in the township.

== Education ==
The township is served by Richland School District, as well as by Pennsylvania Highlands Community College.

The University of Pittsburgh at Johnstown is located within the township.
