= Thomas K. Gilhool =

American civil rights attorney (1938–2020)

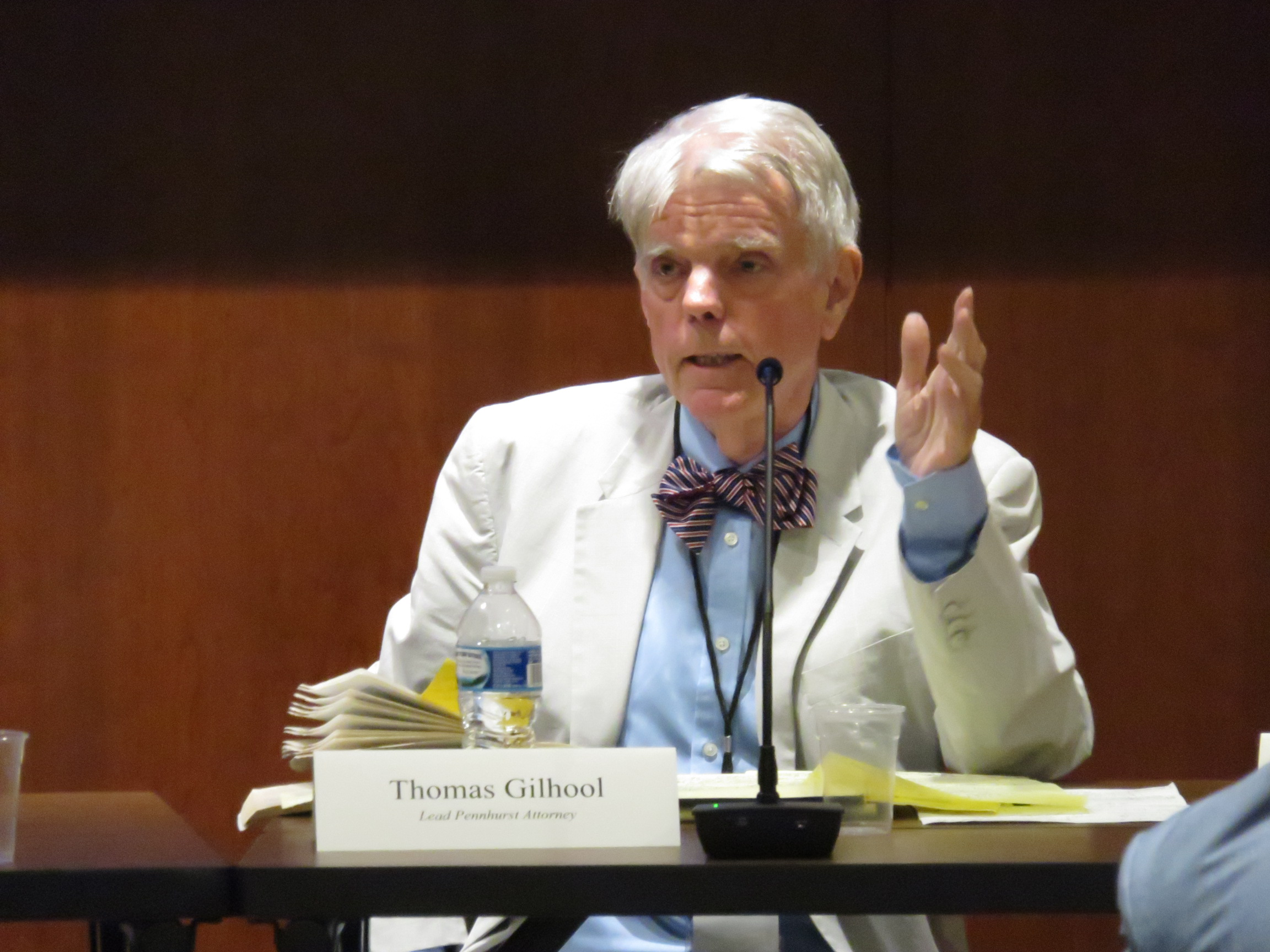
- Born: September 10, 1938; Ardmore, Pennsylvania, U.S.
- Died: August 22, 2020 (aged 81)
- Education: Lehigh University, Yale University, Yale Law School
- Occupations: Disability and civil rights attorney
- Years active: 1964–2008
- Awards: ARC Award, Philadelphia Bar Association; Outstanding Leadership in Disability Law Award, TASH

Thomas K. Gilhool (September 10, 1938 – August 22, 2020) was an American civil rights attorney. Noted as an advocate for the rights of people with disabilities, he served as the chief counsel for the Public Interest Law Center in Philadelphia from 1975 until 2000.

Gilhool was the lead counsel in Pennsylvania Association for Retarded Citizens (PARC) v. Commonwealth of Pennsylvania, which established the constitutional right of children with disabilities to a free, appropriate public education. The case triggered 32 federal court decisions, with Congress enacting the Education for All Handicapped Children Act – which became the Individuals with Disabilities Education Act – in 1975. Gilhool also represented the parents of institutional residents in Halderman vs. Pennhurst State School and Hospital, a landmark case which concluded that developmentally disabled patients under state care have a constitutional right to appropriate treatment and education.

Initially focused on law related to poverty, Gilhool began his career as a public interest lawyer in the 1960s. He won the first legal services case to reach the United States Supreme Court, Smith v. Reynolds, in which the Court struck down the durational residency requirement for public assistance benefits.
