= Pennsylvania Highlands Community College =

College in Johnstown, Pennsylvania, U.S.

Coordinates: 40.26407°N 78.83693°W

- Type: Public community college
- Established: 1993
- President: Steve Nunez
- Location: Johnstown, Pennsylvania, United States
- Website: www.pennhighlands.edu

Pennsylvania Highlands Community College is a public community college in Johnstown, Pennsylvania, United States. Satellite sites are provided in Altoona (Blair County), Ebensburg (northern Cambria County), Somerset (Somerset County), and Huntingdon (Huntingdon County).

== Overview ==
Commissioners of Cambria County voted to establish a community college in 1993, with a 15-member Board of Trustees appointed by October. Dr. John O. Hunter became the founding President the next year. Cambria County Area Community College, as it was then known, offered its first classes on September 5, 1994. It was renamed to Pennsylvania Highlands Community College in 2004. After years with the nickname "the college without walls", it opened its Richland Campus in 2007.

In addition to its main campus, the college now also has locations in Altoona, Ebensburg, Huntingdon, and Somerset.

Pennsylvania Highlands Community College grants admissions to individuals who have successfully earned a high school diploma or a GED high school equivalency. Standardized tests such as SAT's are not required. Pennsylvania Highlands accepts applications year round and admits students on a rolling basis.

== Academics ==
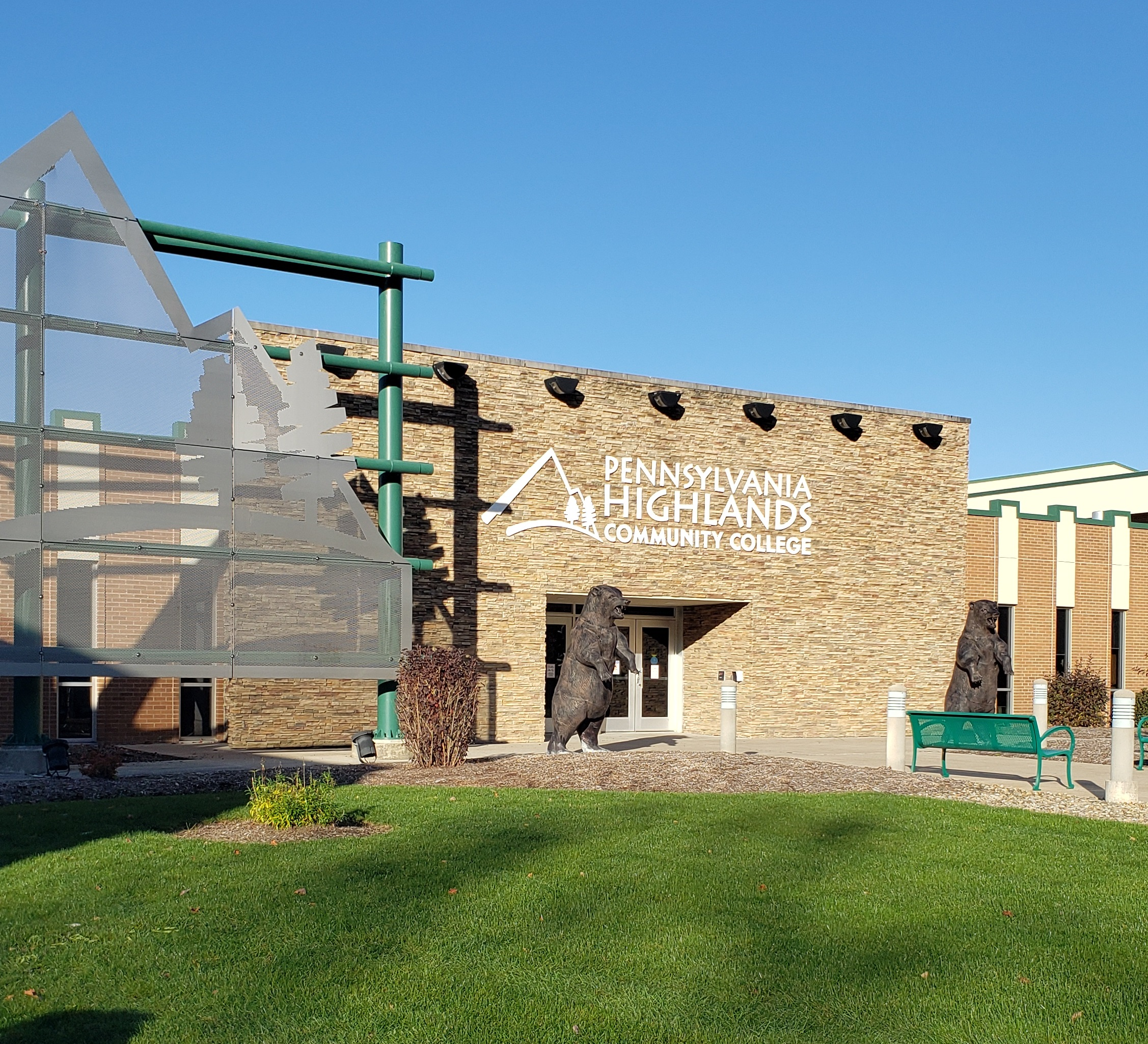
Richland Campus, 2024

The college offers Associate degrees, diploma programs, and certificate programs. It is accredited by the Middle States Commission on Higher Education.
