= Francis V. Barnes =

Pennsylvania Education Secretary from 2004 to 2005

Francis Barnes
- Signature of Francis Barnes.

Secretary of the Pennsylvania Department of Education
- In office 2004–2005

Francis V. Barnes (died 2021) was Secretary of the Pennsylvania Department of Education, from 2004 to 2005.

== Career ==
He was appointed in July 2004 by Pennsylvania Governor Ed Rendell. He was the first African American to hold the position.

Barnes graduated from Slippery Rock University of Pennsylvania with a BS in Education, and letter earned an MEd and a PhD in Philosophy from the University of Pittsburgh. He also served on the board of trustees at the Pennsylvania State University in his capacity as Education Secretary.

Barnes resigned from his position as Education Secretary in 2005, because he claimed the commute separated him from his family.

== Personal life ==
Barnes' wife was Patty. They had two children together. Barnes died on September 18, 2021. He was cousin of broadcaster Robin Roberts.
