= Lower Yoder Township, Pennsylvania =

Township in Pennsylvania, US

Coordinates: 40°19′55″N 78°57′05″W

- Township
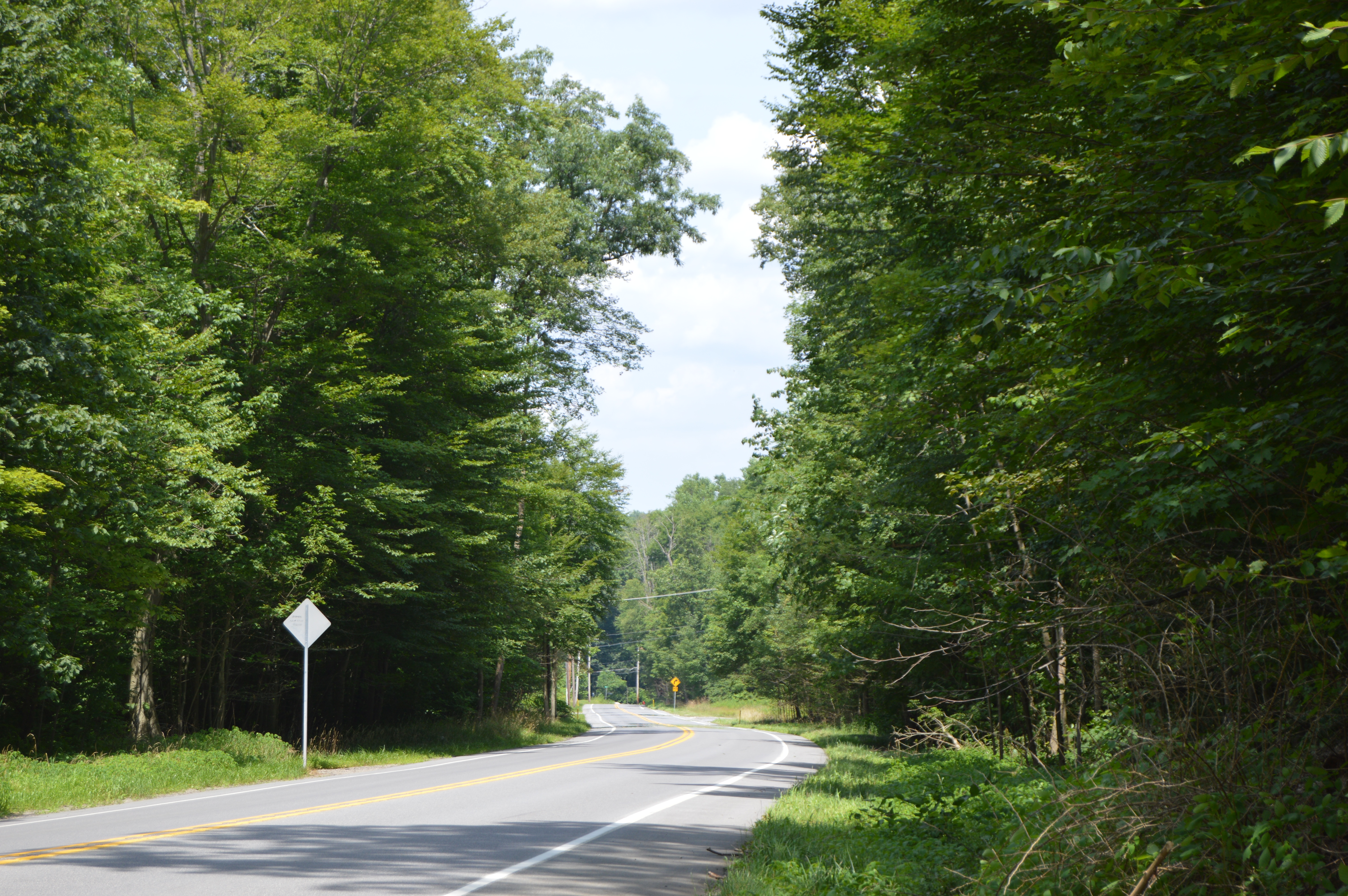
- Hilly countryside scene on St. Clair Road

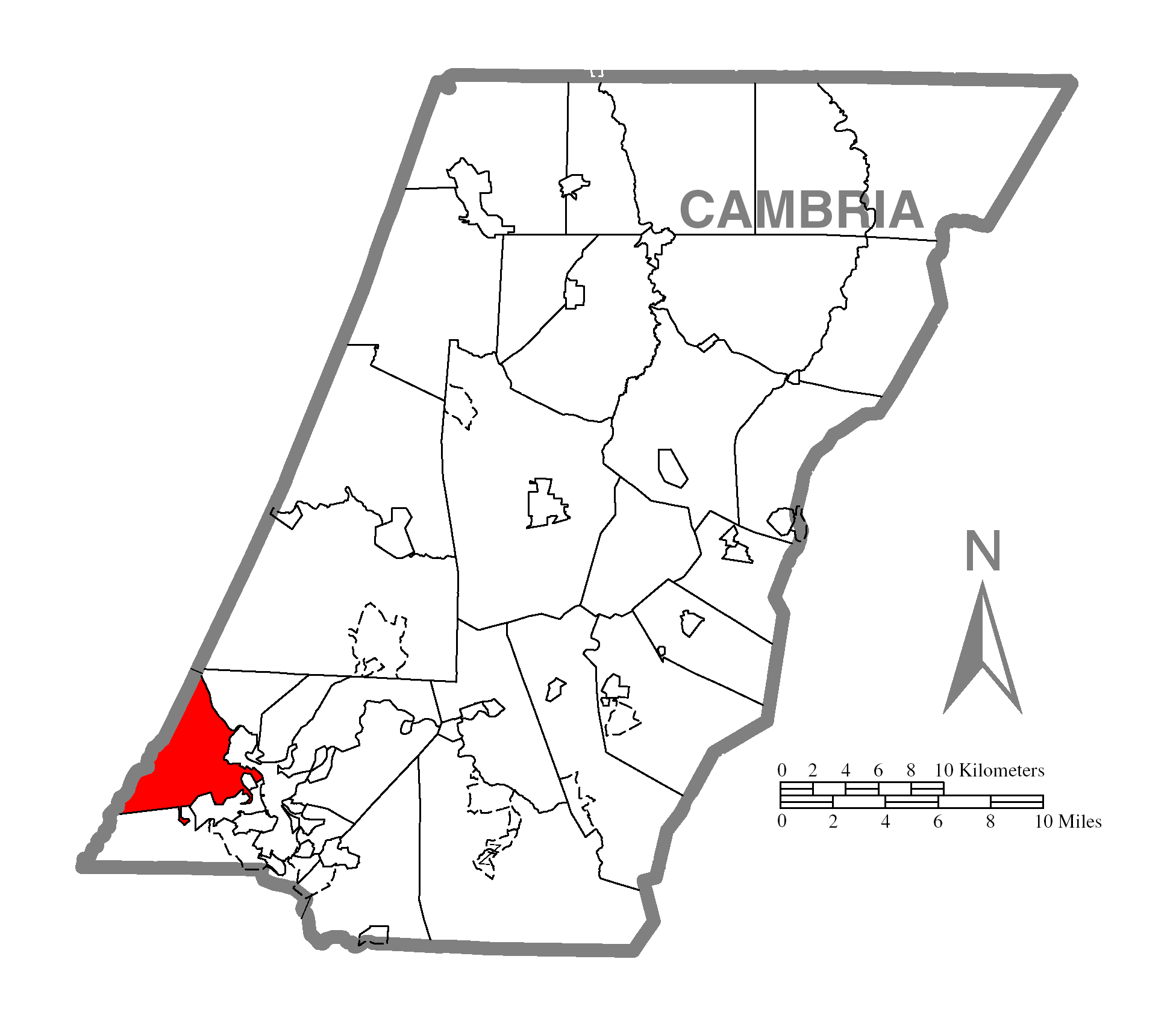
- Map of Cambria County, Pennsylvania highlighting Lower Yoder Township

- Map of Cambria County, Pennsylvania
- Country: United States
- State: Pennsylvania
- County: Cambria
- Settled: 1820
- Incorporated: 1879

Area
  - Total: 13.13 sq mi (34.00 km^{2})
  - Land: 13.04 sq mi (33.78 km^{2})
  - Water: 0.085 sq mi (0.22 km^{2})

Population (2010)
  - Total: 2,699
  - Estimate (2016): 2,544
  - Density: 195.1/sq mi (75.31/km^{2})
- Time zone: UTC-5 (Eastern (EST))
  - Summer (DST): UTC-4 (EDT)
- Area code: 814
- FIPS code: 42-021-45160
- Website: https://lytownship.com/

Lower Yoder Township is a township in Cambria County, Pennsylvania, United States. The population was 2,699 at the 2010 census, down from 3,029 at the 2000 census. It is part of the Johnstown, Pennsylvania Metropolitan Statistical Area.

== Geography ==
Lower Yoder Township is located in southwestern Cambria County, bordered on the west by Westmoreland County. It is bordered on the east by the city of Johnstown and the Conemaugh River. The boroughs of Westmont and Brownstown border the southeastern part of the township. The southern half of the 1,500-foot-deep (460 m) Conemaugh Gorge, where the river cuts through 2,678-foot-high (816 m) Laurel Hill, is in the northern part of the township.

Pennsylvania Route 56 passes through the township, following the Conemaugh River; it leads southeast into Johnstown and northwest 5 miles (8 km) to Seward.

According to the United States Census Bureau, Lower Yoder Township has a total area of 13.1 square miles (34.0 km^{2}), of which 13.1 square miles (33.8 km^{2}) is land and 0.08 square miles (0.2 km^{2}), or 0.65%, is water.

== Communities ==
=== Unincorporated communities ===
- Morrellville
- Westwood

== Demographics ==
Historical population
Census	Pop.	Note	%±
2000	3,029		—
2010	2,699		−10.9%
2016 (est.)	2,544		−5.7%
U.S. Decennial Census

As of the census of 2000, there were 3,029 people, 1,418 households, and 913 families residing in the township. The population density was 229.8 inhabitants per square mile (88.7/km^{2}). There were 1,508 housing units at an average density of 114.4 per square mile (44.2/km^{2}). The racial makeup of the township was 98.38% White, 0.83% African American, 0.33% Asian, 0.07% Pacific Islander, 0.07% from other races, and 0.33% from two or more races. Hispanic or Latino of any race were 0.40% of the population.

There were 1,418 households, out of which 16.9% had children under the age of 18 living with them, 51.6% were married couples living together, 9.2% had a female householder with no husband present, and 35.6% were non-families. 33.6% of all households were made up of individuals, and 20.4% had someone living alone who was 65 years of age or older. The average household size was 2.13 and the average family size was 2.69.

In the township the population was spread out, with 14.8% under the age of 18, 5.1% from 18 to 24, 22.5% from 25 to 44, 27.6% from 45 to 64, and 29.9% who were 65 years of age or older The median age was 50 years. For every 100 females, there were 87.7 males. For every 100 females age 18 and over, there were 86.1 males.

The median income for a household in the township was $29,081, and the median income for a family was $34,355. Males had a median income of $27,388 versus $21,792 for females. The per capita income for the township was $19,196. About 7.1% of families and 7.9% of the population were below the poverty line, including 7.1% of those under age 18 and 8.9% of those age 65 or over.
