= Westwood, Cambria County, Pennsylvania =

Unincorporated community in Pennsylvania, US

Westwood, Pennsylvania
- Census-designated place
- Location within Pennsylvania Location within the United States
- Coordinates: 40°19′43″N 78°57′8″W
- Country: United States
- State: Pennsylvania
- County: Cambria
- Township: Lower Yoder

Area
  - Total: 1.29 sq mi (3.34 km^{2})
  - Land: 1.29 sq mi (3.34 km^{2})
  - Water: 0 sq mi (0.0 km^{2})
- Elevation: 1,736 ft (529 m)
- Time zone: UTC-5 (Eastern (EST))
  - Summer (DST): UTC-4 (EDT)
- ZIP Codes: 15905, 15906 (Johnstown)
- Area codes: 814/582
- FIPS code: 42-84240
- GNIS feature ID: 2805572

Westwood is a census-designated place (CDP) in Cambria County, Pennsylvania, United States. It was first listed as a CDP prior to the 2020 census.

The CDP is in southwestern Cambria County, in the eastern part of Lower Yoder Township. It is bordered to the north by the city of Johnstown, to the east by the borough of Brownstown, and to the south by the borough of Westmont. It sits on a hilltop at elevations ranging from 1,700 to 1,800 feet (520 to 550 m), about 500 to 600 feet (150 to 180 m) above the valley of the Conemaugh River, where Johnstown sits.
