= Vicki Phillips =

U.S. education consultant

Vicki Phillips D.E.
- Born: c. 1958; Breckenridge County, Kentucky, United States
- Occupations: Education consultant and former government and nonprofit executive
- Years active: 1970s – present
- Known for: First woman to hold the position of superintendent of the School District of Lancaster, Pennsylvania

Academic background
- Education: Western Kentucky University (Bachelor of Science degree in elementary education and special education, 1980; Master of Arts degree in school psychology, 1987; University of Lincoln (Doctor of Education degree in international leadership and educational leadership and management, 2002)

Academic work
- Discipline: Elementary education and special education

Vicki Phillips (born c. 1958) is an American education consultant and former executive vice president and chief education officer of National Geographic who previously served as the director of education for the College Ready program of the Bill & Melinda Gates Foundation and as the Secretary of the Pennsylvania Department of Education.

The first woman to hold the position of superintendent of the School District of Lancaster in Lancaster, Pennsylvania, Phillips observed, when asked during a 2008 interview, what the United States still needed to do to improve student and teacher performance nationwide:

"If you look across the country, you see lots of pockets of excellence. What we don't do well yet is systematically address the policy and practice barriers that continually get in the way. It's a combination of obstacles, from how we think about standards and assessment and curriculum to the way we train and certify people to the way we support and compensate them and get them to stay in the profession. We have to decide as a country that we are going to tackle some of those long-standing barriers."

== Formative years ==
Born in Breckenridge County, Kentucky, Phillips graduated from Breckenridge County High School in 1976. Awarded a Bachelor of Science degree in elementary education and special education by Western Kentucky University in 1980, she earned a Master of Arts degree in school psychology from that same institution in 1987. She was then later awarded a Doctor of Education degree in international leadership and educational leadership and management by the University of Lincoln in Lincolnshire, United Kingdom in 2002.

She has also been the recipient of multiple honorary degrees, including an Honorary Doctor of Public Service degree from Western Kentucky University in May 2010, an Honorary Doctor of Education from the University of Lincoln and an Honorary Doctor of Humane Letters from Misericordia University.

== Career ==
From 1978 to 1980, she was employed as the director of developmental training for Panorama in Bowling Green, Kentucky. She oversaw the delivery of educational programs for individuals with disabilities at this intermediate care facility.

A middle and high school educator with the Simpson County Schools in Franklin, Kentucky from 1981 to 1985, Phillips was subsequently hired by the Kentucky Department of Education in Frankfort, Kentucky as a senior executive. She worked here for seven years during the late 1980s and early 1990s.

From 1993 to 1995, she served as deputy director and chief of staff of the National Alliance for Restructuring Education initiative that was sponsored by the National Center on Education and the Economy in Washington, D.C.

She was then appointed as executive director of the Partnership for Reform, an initiative of Greater Philadelphia First that was established to improve the quality of education in public schools across the city of Philadelphia, Pennsylvania. She held that position from 1995 to July 1998, when she was appointed as the superintendent of schools of the School District of Lancaster in Lancaster, Pennsylvania. She was the first woman to hold that position.

Phillips was then nominated by Pennsylvania Governor Ed Rendell to become Secretary of the Pennsylvania Department of Education, a position she held from January 2003 to June 2004.

She left Pennsylvania to become the superintendent of Portland Public Schools in Portland, Oregon, following an intense recruiting effort by that school system, which initially awarded her an annual salary of $203,000, a substantial increase from the $115,533 she was paid by the Commonwealth of Pennsylvania. She served in that capacity until August 2007, when she was hired by the Bill & Melinda Gates Foundation as director of its College Ready program. She remained with the Gates Foundation until December 2015.

In January 2019, she was hired by National Geographic to serve as its executive vice president and chief education officer, and served in this capacity until January 2022. She currently owns and operates her own private education consulting firm.
