= West Taylor Township, Pennsylvania =

Township in Pennsylvania, US

Coordinates: 40°22′47″N 78°53′25″W

- Township
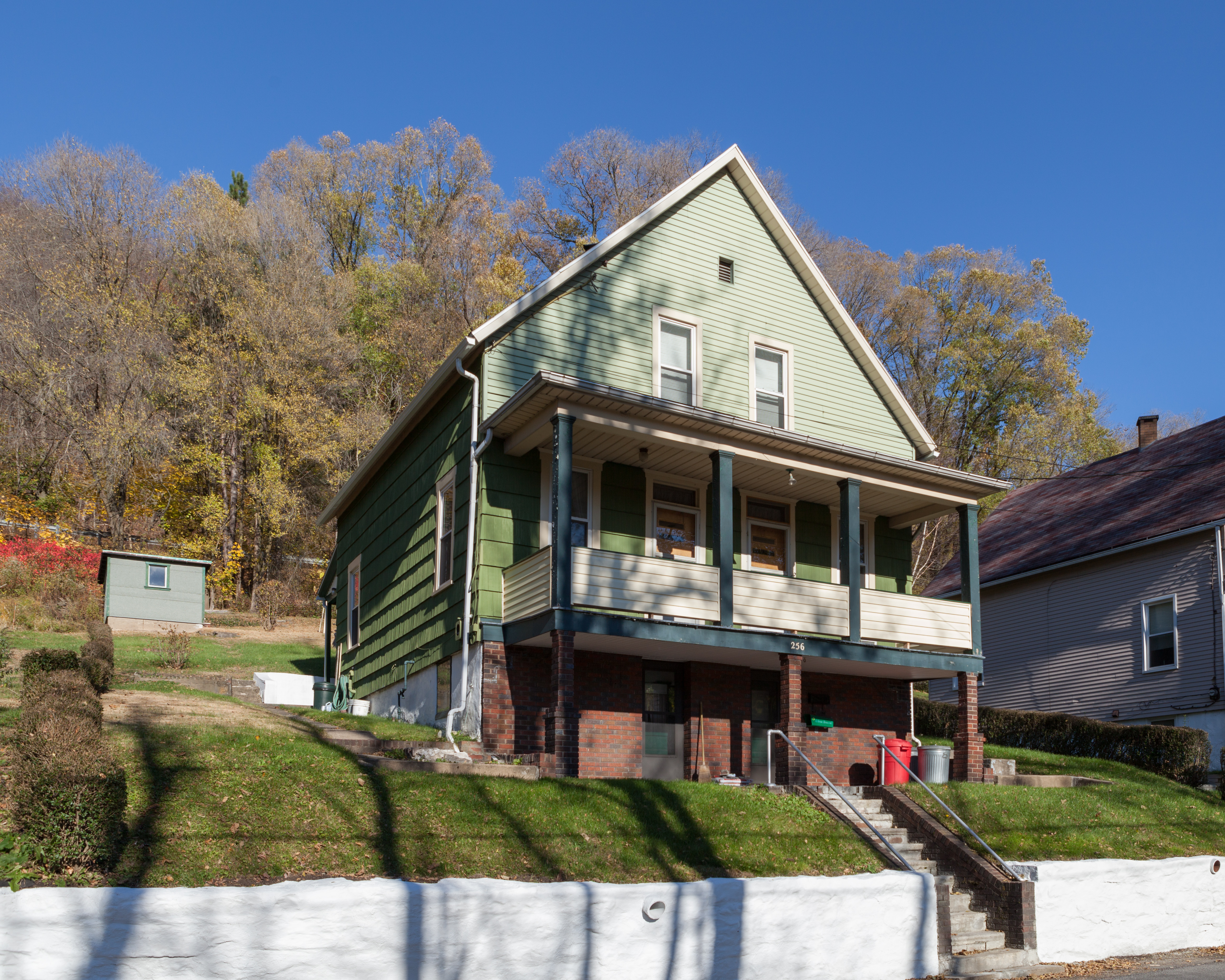
- Iron Street in the Minersville neighborhood

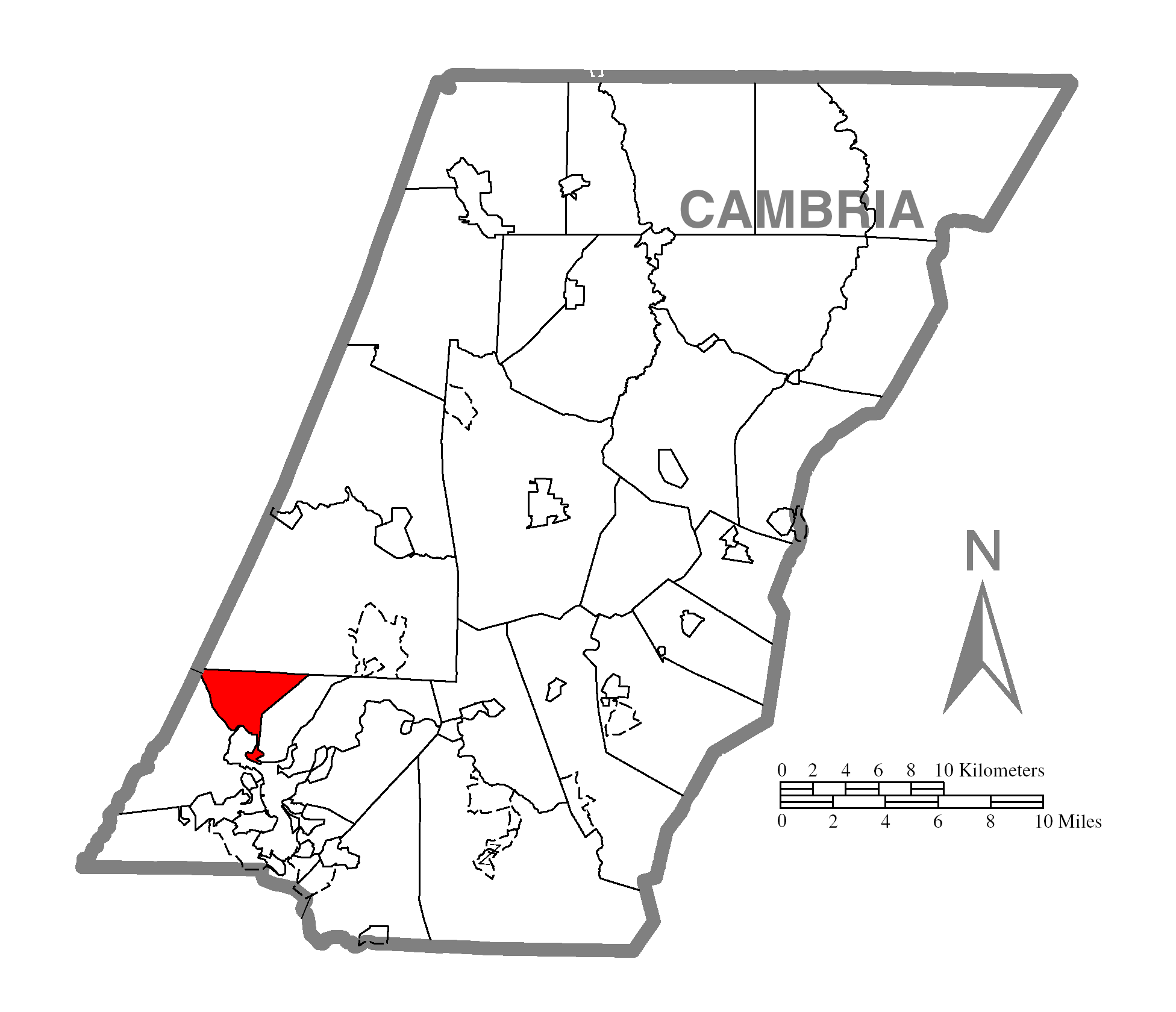
- Map of Cambria County, Pennsylvania highlighting West Taylor Township

- Map of Cambria County, Pennsylvania
- Country: United States
- State: Pennsylvania
- County: Cambria
- Incorporated: 1884

Area
  - Total: 6.13 sq mi (15.87 km^{2})
  - Land: 6.02 sq mi (15.60 km^{2})
  - Water: 0.10 sq mi (0.27 km^{2})

Population (2010)
  - Total: 795
  - Estimate (2016): 756
  - Density: 125.6/sq mi (48.48/km^{2})
- Time zone: UTC-5 (Eastern (EST))
  - Summer (DST): UTC-4 (EDT)
- Area code: 814
- FIPS code: 42-021-84080

West Taylor Township is a township that is located in Cambria County, Pennsylvania, United States. The population was 795 at the time of the 2010 census.

It is part of the Johnstown, Pennsylvania Metropolitan Statistical Area.

== Geography ==
West Taylor Township is located in southwestern Cambria County and is bordered to the south by the city of Johnstown. The Conemaugh River forms the southwestern border of the township as it flows through the Conemaugh Gorge, a 1,400-foot-deep (430 m) canyon carved through the 2,546-foot-high (776 m) ridge of Laurel Hill.

According to the United States Census Bureau, the township has a total area of 6.1 square miles (15.9 km^{2}), of which 6.0 square miles (15.6 km^{2}) is land and 0.12 square miles (0.3 km^{2}), or 1.72%, is water.

== Demographics ==
Historical population
Census	Pop.	Note	%±
2000	862		—
2010	795		−7.8%
2016 (est.)	756		−4.9%
U.S. Decennial Census

As of the census of 2000, there were 862 people, 364 households, and 252 families residing in the township.

The population density was 146.9 inhabitants per square mile (56.7/km^{2}). There were 392 housing units at an average density of 66.8 per square mile (25.8/km^{2}).

The racial makeup of the township was 96.17% White, 3.13% African American, 0.23% Native American, and 0.46% from two or more races. Hispanic or Latino of any race were 1.51% of the population.

There were 364 households, out of which 23.9% had children who were under the age of eighteen living with them, 55.5% were married couples living together, 9.9% had a female householder with no husband present, and 30.5% were non-families. Out of all of the households that were documented, 27.7% were made up of individuals, and 16.5% had someone living alone who was sixty-five years of age or older.

The average household size was 2.29 and the average family size was 2.78.

Within the township, the population was spread out, with 17.2% of residents who were under the age of 18, 6.1% from 18 to 24, 27.4% from 25 to 44, 29.4% from 45 to 64, and 20.0% who were 65 years of age or older. The median age was 44 years.

For every one hundred females, there were 102.3 males. For every one hundred females who were aged eighteen or older, there were 101.7 males.

The median income for a household in the township was $25,046, and the median income for a family was $29,083. Males had a median income of $27,102 compared with that of $20,417 for females.

The per capita income for the township was $14,396.

Approximately 11.7% of families and 14.2% of the population were living below the poverty line, including 20.9% of those who were under the age of eighteen and 11.5% of those who were aged sixty-five or older.
