= Lorain, Pennsylvania =

Borough in Pennsylvania, US

- Borough
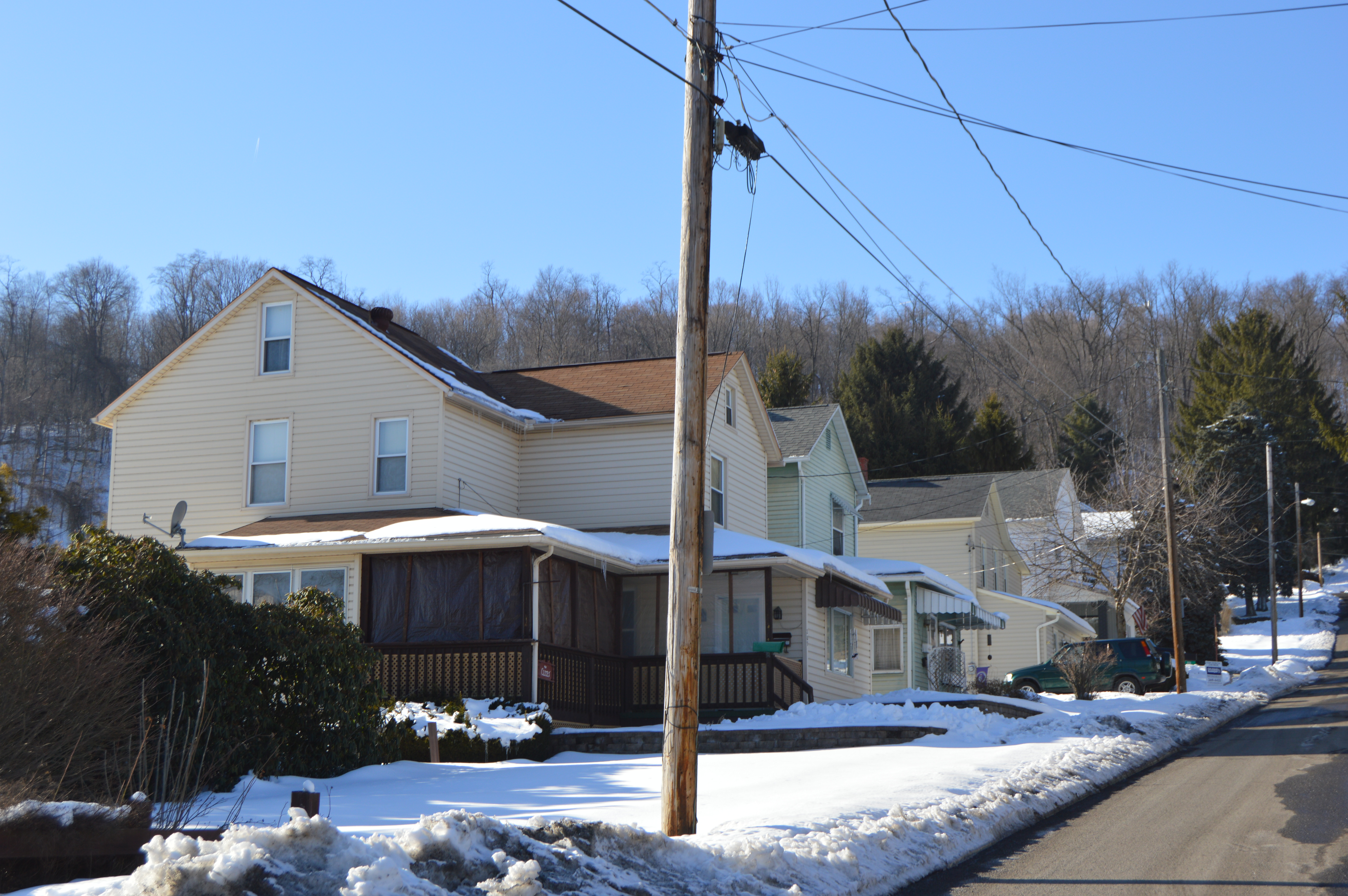
- Houses on Blue Diamond Street

- Location of Lorain in Cambria County, Pennsylvania.

- Location within Pennsylvania
- Coordinates: 40°17′48″N 78°53′45″W
- Country: United States
- State: Pennsylvania
- County: Cambria
- Incorporated: 1915

Government
  - Type: Borough council
  - Mayor: Michael Hammers
  - President: Harold Berkebile JR
  - Vice President: Gary Hoffman
  - Secretary & Treasurer: Tamre J. Ramos CCA, CMC

Area
  - Total: 0.34 sq mi (0.89 km^{2})
  - Land: 0.34 sq mi (0.89 km^{2})
  - Water: 0 sq mi (0.00 km^{2})
- Elevation: 1,457 ft (444 m)

Population (2020)
  - Total: 589
  - Density: 1,720.9/sq mi (664.45/km^{2})
- Time zone: UTC-5 (Eastern (EST))
  - Summer (DST): UTC-4 (EDT)
- ZIP code: 15902
- Area code: 814
- FIPS code: 42-44664
- GNIS feature ID: 1215027
- Website: www.lorainborough.com

Lorain is a borough in Cambria County, Pennsylvania, United States. It is part of the Johnstown, Pennsylvania Metropolitan Statistical Area. As of the 2020 census, Lorain had a population of 589.

== Geography ==
Lorain is located in southwestern Cambria County at 40°17′48″N 78°53′45″W (40.296574, -78.895756). It is bordered on the west by the city of Johnstown.

According to the United States Census Bureau, Lorain has a total area of 0.35 square miles (0.9 km^{2}), all land.

== Demographics ==
Historical population
Census	Pop.	Note	%±
1920	812		—
1930	1,360		67.5%
1940	1,373		1.0%
1950	1,406		2.4%
1960	1,324		−5.8%
1970	972		−26.6%
1980	989		1.7%
1990	824		−16.7%
2000	747		−9.3%
2010	759		1.6%
2020	589		−22.4%

As of the census of 2000, there were 747 people, 336 households, and 217 families residing in the borough. The population density was 2,244.7 inhabitants per square mile (866.7/km^{2}). There were 365 housing units at an average density of 1,096.8 per square mile (423.5/km^{2}). The racial makeup of the borough was 97.32% White, 1.61% African American, 0.80% Asian, and 0.27% from two or more races.

There were 336 households, out of which 25.0% had children under the age of 18 living with them, 44.6% were married couples living together, 14.3% had a female householder with no husband present, and 35.4% were non-families. 30.7% of all households were made up of individuals, and 15.5% had someone living alone who was 65 years of age or older. The average household size was 2.22 and the average family size was 2.77.

In the borough the population was spread out, with 18.3% under the age of 18, 8.0% from 18 to 24, 27.8% from 25 to 44, 23.8% from 45 to 64, and 22.0% who were 65 years of age or older. The median age was 43 years. For every 100 females there were 95.0 males. For every 100 females age 18 and over, there were 94.9 males.

The median income for a household in the borough was $28,150, and the median income for a family was $30,441. Males had a median income of $25,500 versus $17,986 for females. The per capita income for the borough was $17,243. About 13.6% of families and 13.2% of the population were below the poverty line, including 23.4% of those under age 18 and 3.1% of those age 65 or over.

== Government ==
The current mayor and council were elected to office in November 2020. The results of the election placed Michael Hammers into a four-year term as mayor.

== Emergency services ==
Police services are provided by Stonycreek Township Police Department under contract to Lorain Borough.

Ambulance BLS/ALS are provided through East Hills Ambulance, as designated by the Southern Alleghenies EMS Council.

Lorain Volunteer Fire Company has operated from 2002 through October 2010 from the Oakland Volunteer Fire Company's facilities. The two companies assist one another in providing coverage. The Lorain Borough Volunteer Fire Company's firehall had been sold to John Clawson in November 2007 for $25,000.

On October 13, 2010, at the monthly council meeting it was announced that the Lorain Borough Fire Department and the Oakland Fire Department would merge.
