= Geistown, Pennsylvania =

Borough in Pennsylvania, US

- Borough
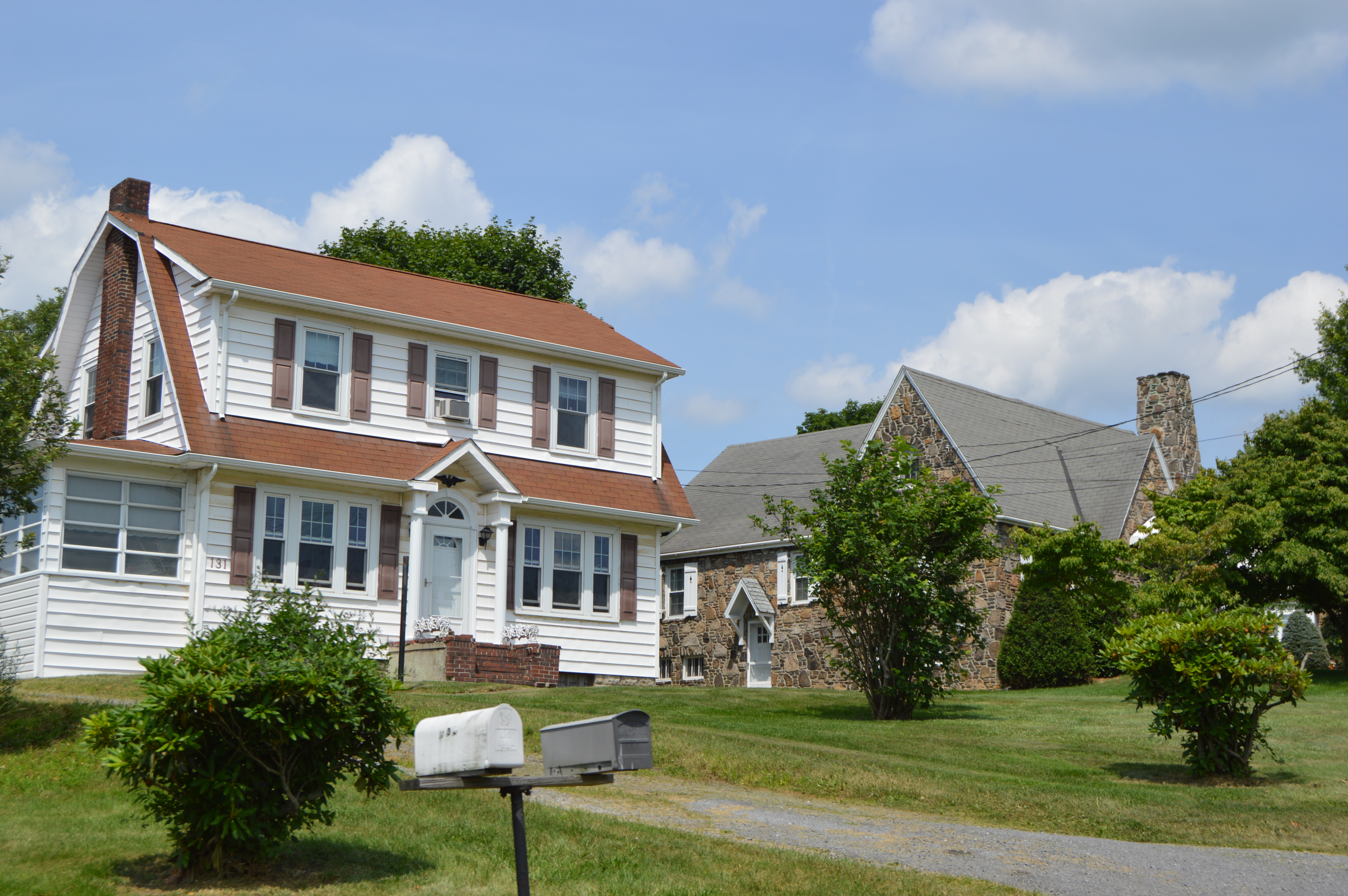
- Houses on Kinzey Street

- Location of Geistown in Cambria County, Pennsylvania.
- Coordinates: 40°17′40″N 78°52′26″W
- Country: United States
- State: Pennsylvania
- County: Cambria
- Settled: 1812
- Incorporated: 1930

Government
  - Type: Borough council

Area
  - Total: 1.07 sq mi (2.77 km^{2})
  - Land: 1.07 sq mi (2.77 km^{2})
  - Water: 0 sq mi (0.00 km^{2})
- Elevation: 1,857 ft (566 m)

Population (2020)
  - Total: 2,363
  - Density: 2,208.9/sq mi (852.88/km^{2})
- Time zone: UTC-5 (Eastern (EST))
  - Summer (DST): UTC-4 (EDT)
- Area code: 814
- FIPS code: 42-28720
- GNIS feature ID: 1215023
- Website: www.geistownborough.com

Geistown is a borough in Cambria County, Pennsylvania, United States. It is part of the Johnstown, Pennsylvania Metropolitan Statistical Area. The population was 2,467 at the 2010 census.

== Geography ==
Geistown is located in southwestern Cambria County at 40°17′40″N 78°52′26″W (40.294325, -78.873968). Downtown Johnstown is 4 miles (6 km) to the northwest.

According to the United States Census Bureau, the borough has a total area of 1.0 square mile (2.7 km^{2}), all land.

== Demographics ==
Historical population
Census	Pop.	Note	%±
1930	871		—
1940	1,037		19.1%
1950	2,148		107.1%
1960	3,186		48.3%
1970	3,633		14.0%
1980	3,304		−9.1%
1990	2,749		−16.8%
2000	2,555		−7.1%
2010	2,467		−3.4%
2020	2,363		−4.2%

As of the census of 2000, there were 2,555 people, 1,105 households, and 749 families residing in the borough. The population density was 2,364.1 people per square mile (912.8 people/km^{2}). There were 1,160 housing units at an average density of 1,073.3 per square mile (414.4/km^{2}). The racial makeup of the borough was 97.69% White, 0.39% African American, 0.04% Native American, 1.37% Asian, 0.04% from other races, and 0.47% from two or more races. Hispanic or Latino of any race were 0.31% of the population.

There were 1,105 households, out of which 25.2% had children under the age of 18 living with them, 57.4% were married couples living together, 7.9% had a female householder with no husband present, and 32.2% were non-families. 29.7% of all households were made up of individuals, and 15.0% had someone living alone who was 65 years of age or older. The average household size was 2.30 and the average family size was 2.85.

In the borough the population was spread out, with 21.1% under the age of 18, 5.8% from 18 to 24, 24.1% from 25 to 44, 26.2% from 45 to 64, and 22.8% who were 65 years of age or older. The median age was 44 years. For every 100 females there were 87.0 males. For every 100 females age 18 and over, there were 84.5 males.

The median income for a household in the borough was $33,646, and the median income for a family was $47,049. Males had a median income of $32,478 versus $22,134 for females. The per capita income for the borough was $21,002. About 4.0% of families and 6.5% of the population were below the poverty line, including 5.3% of those under age 18 and 8.6% of those age 65 or over.
