= Tarumá =

Coordinates: 18.1272°S 63.4669°W

- Town
- Interactive map of Tarumá
- Country: Bolivia
- Time zone: UTC-4 (BOT)

Tarumá is a small, possibly unincorporated town in Santa Cruz, Bolivia that lies along Route 7, between San Luis and Tiquipaya.

Tarumá is a sector or stretch of road along Route 7, and includes the Tarumá Bridge which is at risk of rockslides.
