= Route 13 (Bolivia) =

Highway in Bolivia

Route 13
- Ruta 13

Location
- Country: Bolivia

Highway system
- Highways of Bolivia; National Roads

Route 13 is a National Road in the South American Andean state of Bolivia.

== Route guidance ==
Route 13 has a length of 370 kilometers and crosses the northern part of the Bolivian lowland from west to east, from the border with the Brazilian state of Acre to the flood plain of the Beni River. The entire length of the road crosses the Departments of Pando and Beni and leads for the most part through intact tropical rainforest, only in a narrow strip next to the road is slash-burned pasture land. The road begins in the northwest as an extension of the Brazilian "Estrada de Pacífico" (BR-317) in Cobija and ends in the east at El Triangulo on the Route 8, the follows the Beni River from Yucumo in the south to Guayaramerín in the northeast.

The first 33 kilometers of Route 13 in the northwest are paved, the remaining 337 kilometers from Porvenir to El Triangulo are unpaved. The road crosses on its way five large rivers, three of which have to be crossed by ferry: with a ferry of the Madre de Dios River and the Manupare River at Sena and with a second of the Beni River, which forms the border between the departments of Pando and Beni. There are bridges over the Orthon River at Puerto Rico and the Geneshuaya River, the easternmost of the five rivers. But it is also planned to build via the Beni River and the Madre de Dios and Manupare Rivers, so that ferries are no longer necessary.
