= Roboré Airport =

- IATA: RBO; ICAO: SLRB

Summary
- Airport type: Public, military
- Serves: Roboré, Bolivia
- Elevation AMSL: 905 ft / 276 m
- Coordinates: 18°19′40″S 59°45′55″W

Map
- Location of Roboré Airport in Bolivia

Runways
Direction	Length		Surface
Direction	m	ft	Surface
18/36	1,210	3,970	Grass
- Source: Landings.com Google Maps GCM

Roboré Airport Spanish: Aeropuerto Roboré, (IATA: RBO, ICAO: SLRB) is a joint public/military airport serving Roboré, a town in the Santa Cruz Department of Bolivia.

The runway is between the west side of the town and the Cuartel de Roboré military barracks. There is rising terrain to the north, and a mountain to the northeast.

The Robore non-directional beacon (Ident: OBO) is located on the field.

== See also ==
- Transport in Bolivia
- List of airports in Bolivia
