= Route 5 (Bolivia) =

Highway in Bolivia

Route 5
- Ruta 5

Route information
- Length: 898 km (558 mi)

Major junctions
- North-east end: La Palizada
- South-west end: Hito LX near Chilean border

Location
- Country: Bolivia

Highway system
- Highways of Bolivia; National Roads
← Route 4	→ Route 6

Route 5 is a National Road in Bolivia. The road is 898 km long and traverses the Bolivian Altiplano from northeast to southwest, from the Cordillera Oriental. The road crosses the departments of Santa Cruz, Cochabamba, Chuquisaca, and Potosí.

== Route ==
Route 5 begins in the north-east as a turnoff from Route 7 at La Palizada and ends in the south-west at a village of Hito LX on the Chilean border.

The first 80 kilometres from La Palizada are paved straight, the following 540 kilometres to Uyuni are completely paved. The remaining 260km southwest of Uyuni are unpaved.

Route 5 has been declared part of the Bolivian National Road "Red Vial Fundamental" by Decree 25.134 of 31 August 1998.
