= Road expansion =

Increasing rate at which roads are being constructed worldwide

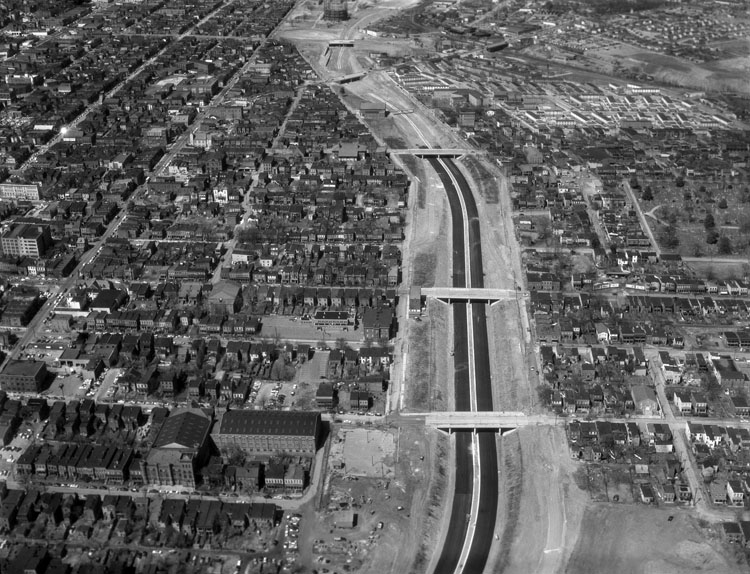
Construction of Interstate 95, downtown Richmond

Road expansion refers to the increasing rate at which roads are constructed globally. Increases in population size and GDP, particularly in developing nations, are the primary drivers of road expansion but transportation planning decisions also play an important role. The anticipated length of newly paved roads to be built between 2010 and 2050 would encircle the planet more than 600 times. Approximately 90% of the new roads are being built in developing nations. Africa and Southeast Asia are predicted to experience a large amount of road expansion shortly.

Road expansion in Asian countries is a significant aspect of infrastructure development, driven by urbanization, economic growth, and connectivity needs. Countries like China, India, and Indonesia have ambitious plan for expanding their road networks to accommodate increasing traffic and trade demands. These projects often face challenges related to land acquisition, environmental impact, and funding, but they play a crucial role in fostering economic development and improving accessibility for remote regions.

Roads facilitate access to markets, health services and education but may adversely affect the natural environment, and impact communities and economies. There is also a disagreement on whether expanding and widening congested roadways truly relieves traffic congestion.

== Effects on the Environment ==
The expansion of road infrastructure can have numerous impacts on environmental systems. Road construction and usage can serve as a significant source of mortality for wildlife. Roads can affect animal movements either by acting as a barrier or allowing easier movement.

Habitat fragmentation caused by road expansion can impact the movement and migration of species, as well as breeding and genetic structure. Fragmentation also produces edge effects that alter the microclimate and ecological succession of habitat patches. Exploitation. Expansion can increase accessibility to previously intact ecosystems, allowing for increased rates of (over-)exploitation of natural resources through hunting, logging, and mining. These activities, along with fires and conversion of forest to other land uses are major causes of tropical forest loss across the globe. Road expansion increases deforestation through increased access to previously inaccessible forests, facilitating unofficial road building, legal and illegal logging, illegal colonization of previously undisturbed areas, land speculation, land grabbing, and forest conversion through illegal and legal means. A strong positive correlation has been observed between road building and deforestation in regions such as the United States, Europe, and China. Around 95% of all deforestation in European countries has occurred within 5.5 km of legal or illegal roads, indicating a strong association of existing and planned roads as a proximate driver of forest loss and degradation. Road expansion also facilitates increased access for hunters and poachers, leading to an increase in both legal and illegal hunting. In Central Africa, the strongest predictors of decline in elephant populations were proximity to expanding infrastructure and the absence of law enforcement. A significant decline in African forest elephant populations between 2002 and 2011 was facilitated by increased road-building rates in Central Africa. In equatorial West Africa, the collapse of gorilla and chimpanzee populations was primarily caused by hunting that was spurred by a rapid expansion of road networks, which facilitated poaching as well as habitat conversion.

Where forest management is weak, road expansion proceeds unregulated and can be allowed to fragment crucial bioregions and protected areas. In Africa, upgraded and proposed road-development corridors intersect 345 protected areas, of which 69 were high-value protected areas (national parks, World Heritage Site, Ramsar site).

== Effects on the economy ==
=== Market access ===
Road infrastructure development lowers the cost of logistics, especially for remote communities. Increased consumer base allows producers, such as farmers, to increase the export of their goods, and thereby increase the flow of money into the industry. Improved road infrastructure has reduced poverty by facilitating higher production and exports in Peru, Bangladesh, and parts of Sub-Saharan Africa. Improved market access as a result of improved road infrastructure facilitates a shift from subsistence agriculture to increasingly specialized and commercialized agriculture. Increased commercialization of agriculture results in economic gains for communities, however it can also increase dependence on external markets and external sources of goods. This has been shown to either result in improved food security, as communities are not reliant on their own agricultural capacity, or be detrimental to nutritional status as communities no longer produce a diverse range of crops.

Facilitating access of remote communities to urban markets can also have the effect of allowing urban market influences to affect rural economies. In the Democratic Republic of the Congo, urban markets are subject to greater control by soldiers than are rural markets, resulting in hunters and farmers paying more protection money and getting less of a share of profits made. Greater market intensity is in some instances environmentally detrimental. In the Democratic Republic of the Congo, more large-bodied and endangered animals are hunted for sale in urban markets than in rural markets.

=== Road construction ===
Roads must be well designed and constructed to reduce impacts on regional geomorphology and hydrology. In undulating terrain, road construction typically proceeds via cut-and-fill activities, in which high parts of the landscape are cut down and the fill (soil and mineral earth) is bulldozed into lower areas, in order to flatten-out the topography along the road route. Concurrently, vegetation is usually cleared along and adjacent to a road footprint. These practices dramatically increase surface erosion and sediment inputs to water courses, altering hydrological patterns, reducing water quality for humans and livestock and elevating water turbidity and temperature. The altered existing hydrological dynamics resulting from cut and fill activities, inadequate drainage, culverts, and bridges associated with road construction can also obstruct surface-water flow, leading to impeded drainage and localized flooding, particularly during high-rainfall episodes.

Road construction in mountainous areas or steep terrain increases the risks of landslides, particularly in wet environments. Site disturbances, vegetation clearing, unstable terrain caused by cut-and-fill activities, and road drainage all contribute to the elevated rates of landslides in mountainous or steep terrain areas with roads[48], with the likelihood of landslides in close proximity to roads being up to five times higher. In the Brazilian Amazon, ~90% of fires occurred within ≤10 km of roads.

Road construction in forests leads to an increased frequency of fires. This happens via numerous mechanisms, including intentionally lit fires (leading to deforestation), leaked fires from land management practices adjacent to fragmented forests or roads, and accidental fires due to increased human-ignition sources. Increased fire frequency results directly in biomass loss and carbon emissions, and elevated fire regimes alter the species composition and ecological dynamics of susceptible forests.

=== Traffic and road maintenance ===
Funding for new road infrastructure in developing nations is focused on initial road construction, with less money being earmarked for ongoing maintenance. With many new roads being constructed in high-rainfall tropical environments, degradation leading to slumping and pot-holing is rendering expensive paved roads impassable in just a few years. Road degradation increases the cost of using the road, by lengthening travel time or causing damage to vehicles. Poor quality paved roads may cost less on initial construction, but are more costly to maintain and produce greater costs of use over the life of the road.

Maintaining roads involves long-term and major investments which are subjected to corrupt practices of those responsible for maintenance. Moreover, budgeting high construction costs, but building substandard roads which require higher levels of maintenance are both common practice and a major drain on public expenditure and private investment. Such activities escalate costs and reduce the usable lifetime of roads, and are particularly evident in many developing countries where corruption is more pervasive and implicitly tolerated.

Increased road expansion incentivizes people to purchase cars and use roads to a greater extent. This results in further degradation of the roads, leading to higher maintenance costs. Increased use of vehicles and roads leads to more accidents, particularly in regions where roads are of poor quality and motor vehicle use is relatively novel. More roads result in more traffic, due to induced demand, further increasing the rate of road degradation. As such, economic appraisals of road projects in developing countries often find that improving existing road infrastructure is more beneficial than construction of new road infrastructure.

== Effects on societies ==
=== Access to services ===
In developing countries especially, goods and services such as health facilities and educational facilities are often concentrated in urban regions, with little to no availability in remote and rural areas. Road expansion provides greater accessibility to urban centers, and hence improves educational attainment. In both Bangladesh and Madagascar investments in improving rural roads have led to greater education attainment. Similarly, greater access to urban areas gives remote communities better access to health facilities, including medical supplies and medical information, and has been associated with better health outcomes.

Access to urban centers facilitated by road expansion improves employment opportunities. In Indonesia, improved roads allowed job creation in manufacturing industries and an occupational shift amongst workers away from agriculture. Conversely, a greater supply of people seeking employment can drive down the wages in an area, producing a negative effect on livelihoods.

While access to goods and services associated with urban centers is beneficial, increased relocation to already densely populated centers increases the strain on cities already struggling to cope with growing populations, particularly in developing regions. Increasing urbanization presents problems including increased crime, increasing inequality, and public health concerns.

=== Migration and culture ===
Road expansion leads to forced migration of local peoples, with indigenous groups often being highly vulnerable. This happens via the influx of non-indigenous settlers who migrate into the region for employment or to exploit local resources. Non-indigenous settlers can attain or claim the land title through land grabbing, land speculation, and illegal colonization. While migration increases urbanization, potentially leading to increased development, this is at the expense of indigenous populations.

Road expansion is particularly threatening for vulnerable remote communities. Large road projects generate an influx of temporary migrant workers, which increases the demand for services such as prostitution and black-market products. Beyond this, road expansion in remote areas also promotes activities such as illegal logging, illegal mining, poaching, smuggling and illicit drug production. Such activities can have chain-reaction-like impacts on the traditional culture and social structure of local communities. The scale and pace of these impacts are most severe in indigenous communities.

The traditional culture and lifestyles of indigenous groups that have lived in remote areas for many generations are substantially altered by new roads. Unprecedented road penetration into their natural landscapes can damage the aesthetic of the landscape and traditional cultural practices, the influx of non-indigenous land settlers violates traditional land rights, and increased commercial poaching alters traditional hunting practices. All such consequences degrade the cultural heritage of indigenous communities, increasing loss of their traditional identity and culture.

=== Diseases ===
Temporary workers for road building and the influx of settlers resulting from road building bring new pests and diseases into communities. This mechanism is particularly dangerous for indigenous communities that have limited tolerance and immunity to new pathogens. For instance, the construction of the Route 8 in Bolivia in the 1970s resulted in the death of 45% of one indigenous community within a single year.

Road expansion increases the incursion of common diseases into communities such as malaria and also increase the vulnerability of communities to previously uncommon diseases such as HIV. This occurs as pests and pathogens use roads as a pathway to spread from one place to another place. Human enteric pathogen levels, for instance, were 2–8-times higher in Ecuadorian villages near roads than in more remote areas and incursions of dengue fever, malaria, and HIV were higher among people living near roads than in remote communities.

=== Conflict ===
The influx of non-indigenous migrants through road building, and the associated intensification of contact, create inter-group conflicts, such as seen between indigenous Amazonian tribes and loggers or gold miners. Additionally, increased road access increases the spread of conflicting forces in war-torn regions, and the pace at which conflicts escalate. In the Democratic Republic of Congo, more accessible regions were exposed to more violent events than less accessible regions resulting in a decrease of population welfare.

== Reducing the impacts of road expansion ==
There are a few ways of reducing its impacts.

=== Expanding existing roads ===
Following the 'first-cut-is-the-deepest' dictum, the expansion or upgrading of roads in previously settled areas is believed to cause less environmental impact per kilometer of road development than where new roads penetrate intact forest landscapes. Beyond this rule of thumb, however, road expansion threatens remnant habitats of endangered species and leads to the loss of remnant areas of rare ecosystems (e.g., lowland tropical forest). This is increasingly common as new major road developments seek to consolidate earlier, rudimentary road networks (often characterized by penetration roads, improvised roads, and rough tracks) to expand agricultural and industrial activities in partially deforested landscapes. Many economic appraisals of road projects in developing countries have found that improving existing road infrastructure is more beneficial than construction of new road infrastructure.

Examples of such consolidative road-expansion projects include the various 'development corridors' of Africa, meant to facilitate trans-national economic activities; Indonesia's development corridors as per its Master Development Plan, meant to accelerate agro-industrial development, mining and timber extraction; and China's Belt and Road initiative. In northern Sumatra, Indonesia, proposed road developments extending the Trans-Sumatran Highway if they were to occur will affect six of the eight local conservation priority areas of the Leuser Ecosystem, comprising 89% of the remaining Sumatran orangutan's habitat. In fact, Forest conversion due to road development in this region has been projected as a major factor influencing the decline in orangutan populations.

=== Limiting road expansion ===
Road planning to limit the extension of existing roads in ecologically vulnerable areas or mitigation measures such as restriction of road width and the inclusion of faunal overpasses is an emerging field of conservation science. Aside from the environmental benefits, limiting road expansion is beneficial for social and economic factors in developing regions. Many roads in remote areas have uncertain socio-economic benefits and surprisingly high economic, social, and environmental risks, and a cost-benefit analysis of 33 planned 'development corridors' in sub-Saharan Africa concluded that less than one-fifth of the projects were clearly justified. Many road developments will be characterized by upgrades to rudimentary road networks, rather than entirely new roads. The Trans-Borneo Highway in Sabah, Malaysia is one example, as virtually all road developments on this route planned for 2033 will coincide with existing logging roads or two-lane access roadways.

=== Project assessment ===
The use of more rigorous approaches to project assessment and planning, such as cost-benefit analyses, proactive land-use planning, and strategic environmental-impact assessments, is important for the improvement of road developments.

== See also ==
- Agricultural expansion
- Automotive city
- Braess's paradox
- Freeway removal
- Highway revolt
- Road diet
- Sustainable Development Goal 11 – 11th of 17 Sustainable Development Goals for sustainable cities
