= Bulo Bulo Airport =

- IATA: none; ICAO: SLBB

Summary
- Airport type: Public
- Serves: Bulo Bulo, Bolivia
- Elevation AMSL: 886 ft / 270 m
- Coordinates: 17°15′20″S 64°22′10″W

Map
- Location of Bulo Bulo Airport in Bolivia

Runways
Direction	Length		Surface
Direction	m	ft	Surface
13/31	1,120	3,675	Grass
- Sources: Landings.com Google Maps GCM

Bulo Bulo Airport (ICAO: SLBB) is an airstrip serving the town of Bulo Bulo in the Cochabamba Department of Bolivia.

== See also ==
- Transport in Bolivia
- List of airports in Bolivia
