= Puerto Suárez International Airport =

Puerto Suárez International Airport Capitán Av. Salvador Ogaya G. Airport
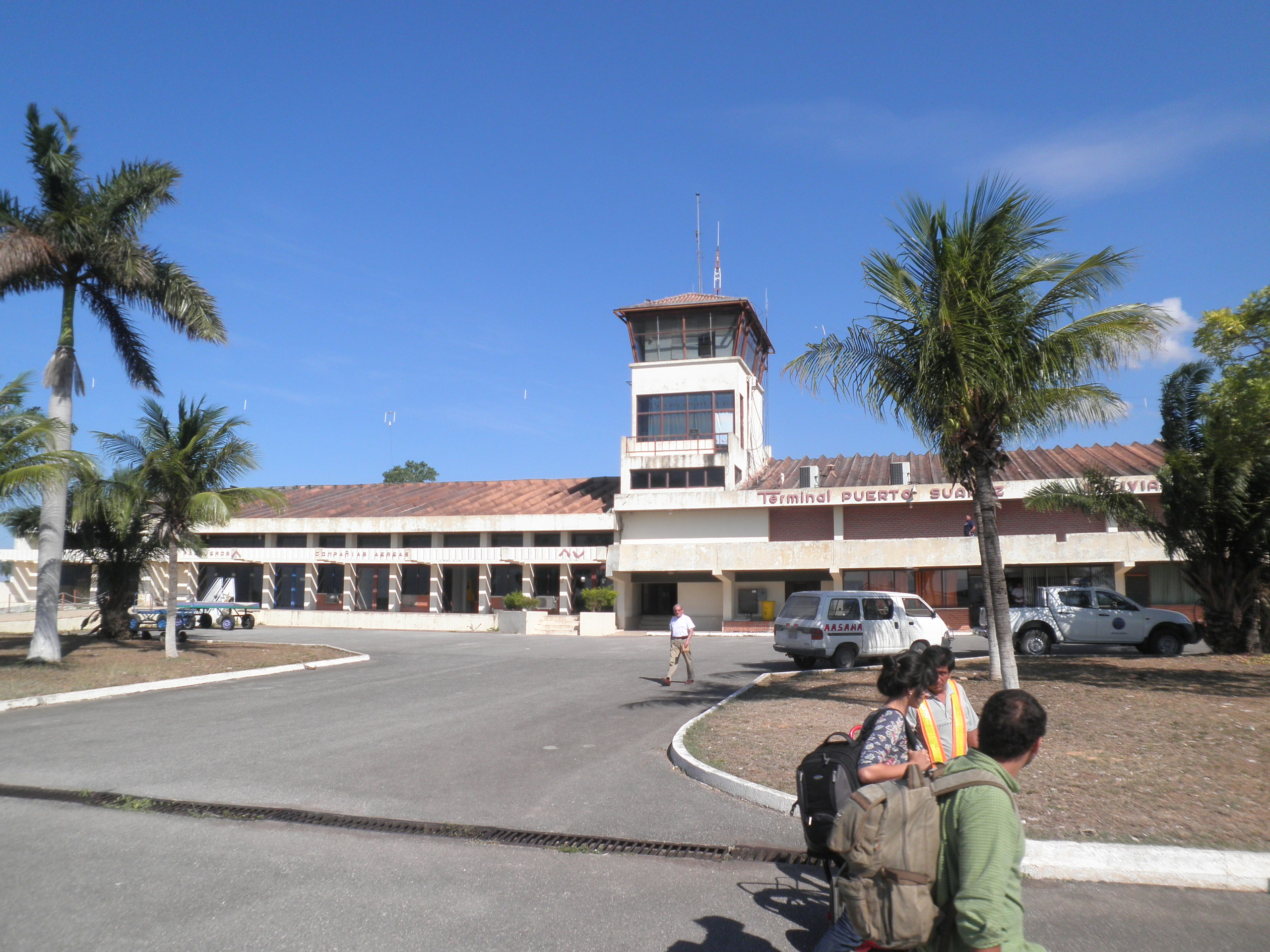
- IATA: PSZ; ICAO: SLPS

Summary
- Airport type: Public
- Location: Puerto Suárez, Bolivia
- Elevation AMSL: 440 ft / 134 m
- Coordinates: 18°58′30″S 057°49′14″W

Map
- Location of airport in Bolivia

Runways
Direction	Length		Surface
Direction	m	ft	Surface
05/23	2,000	6,562	Asphalt
- Sources: GCM Google Maps

Puerto Suárez International Airport (IATA: PSZ, ICAO: SLPS), also known as Capitán Av. Salvador Ogaya G. Airport, is an airport serving Puerto Suárez, a city in the Santa Cruz Department of Bolivia. The airport is in the easternmost part of Bolivia, near the border with Brazil.

The Puerto Suarez non-directional beacon (Ident: PSZ) is located on the field.

Currently, there are no scheduled flights operated at the airport. Previously, it was served by two defunct airlines including Lloyd Aereo Boliviano and TAMep.

== Airlines and destinations ==
Airlines	Destinations

== See also ==
- Transport in Bolivia
- List of airports in Bolivia
