= Railway stations in Bolivia =

Following is a list of railway stations in Bolivia, categorized by eastern and western networks. The eastern and western networks do not directly connect, except via a roundabout route through Argentina.

Many lines originally were 762mm gauge; some, but not all, have been converted to 1000mm gauge.

== Maps ==
- UN Map

== Towns served by rail ==
=== West ===
- Guaqui (3822m) - branch terminus and inland port
- Viacha - junction
- La Paz (3640m) - terminus and national administrative capital
- Oruro, Bolivia (3710m) - junction
- Cochabamba (2574m) - terminus
- Potosí - branch
- Sucre (2750m) - branch terminus and national constitutional capital
- Uyuni (3670m) - junction for line to Chile
- Tupiza
- Villazón - border with Argentina

- Arque

==== Open or Closed? ====
- Uncia - branch terminus - mine

=== East ===
- Trinidad (130m) - terminus
- Loreto
- Santa Rosa del Sara
- Montero (292m)
- Santa Cruz - junction for Trinidad and Puerto Suárez
- Villamontes (439m)
- Yacuiba- border with Argentina
- San José de Chiquitos (304m)
- Roboré
- Santa Ana de Velasco
- (Bolivia) Puerto Suárez (117m) - border with Brazil
- (Brazil) Corumbá

=== Proposed ===
- Sucre (W)
- (missing link)
- Santa Cruz (E)

- 2013, September, design consultancy for Montero-Bulo Bulo railway
- 2010, October, Peru and Bolivia agreed to transfer land from Peru to Bolivia to provide Bolivia with access to the sea, to replace the lands stolen & lost in the War of the Pacific with Chile.
- Ilo, Peru (15m) port to be leased to Bolivia
- (Bolivia) Puerto Suárez

== See also ==
- Transport in Bolivia
- Bolivia
- Railway stations in Peru - transAndean Railway
