= Micrurus diana =

Conservation status
- Least Concern (IUCN 3.1)

Scientific classification
- Kingdom: Animalia
- Phylum: Chordata
- Class: Reptilia
- Order: Squamata
- Suborder: Serpentes
- Family: Elapidae
- Genus: Micrurus
- Species: M. diana

Binomial name
- Micrurus diana Roze, 1983
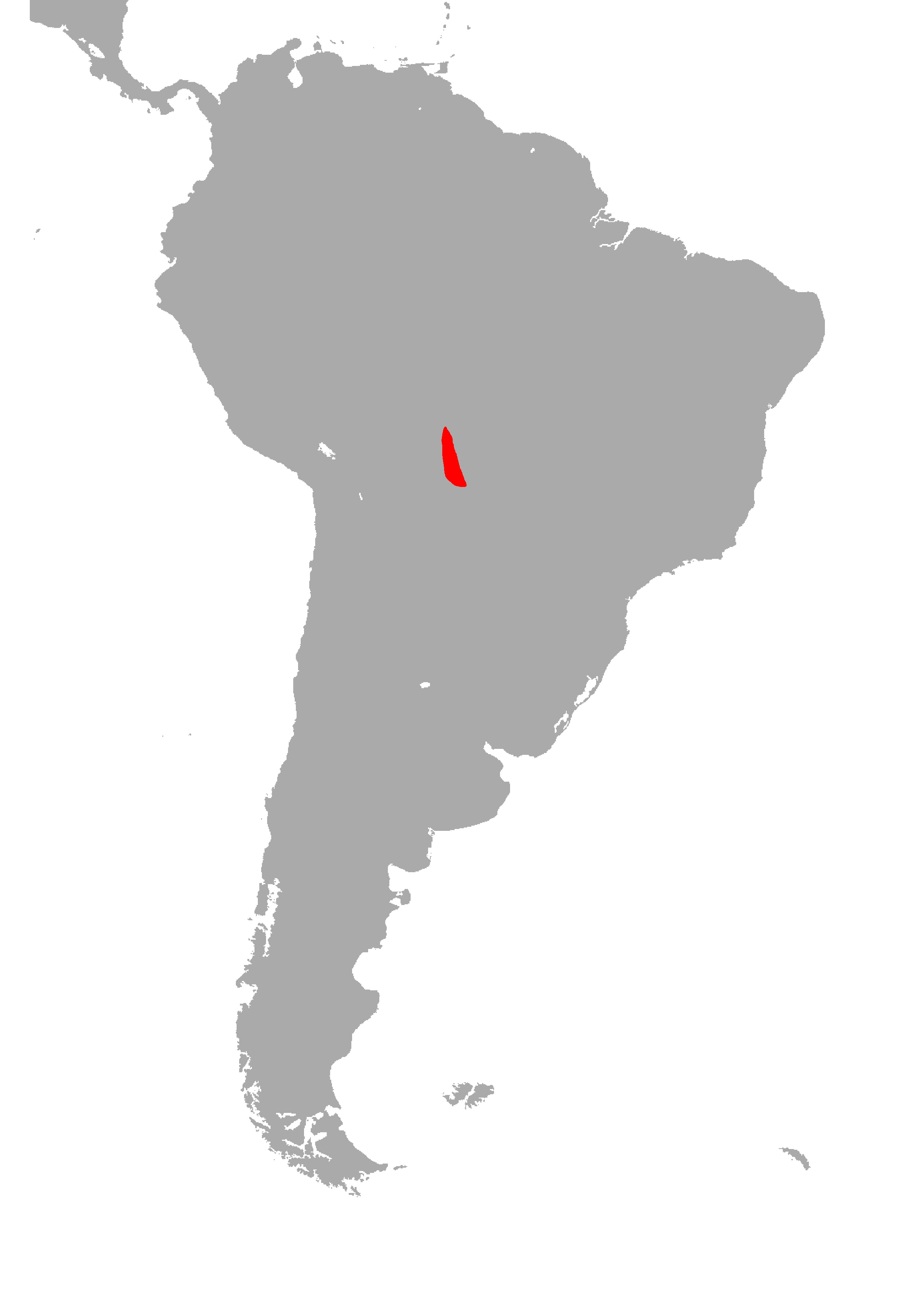

Synonyms
- Micrurus frontalis diana Roze, 1983; Micrurus diana — Roze, 1994

Species of snake

Micrurus diana, also known commonly as Diana's coral snake, is a species of venomous snake in the family Elapidae. The species is native to South America.

== Etymology ==
The specific name, diana, is dedicated to the goddess Diana.

== Geographic range ==
Specimens of M. diana have been identified in Bolivia (Tucavaca Valley Municipal Reserve) and Brazil (Mato Grosso).

== Habitat ==
The preferred natural habitat of M. diana is undisturbed forest, at altitudes of 240–700 m (790–2,300 ft).

== Description ==
M. diana has a color pattern of red, white, and black rings, which are arranged in triads. The snout and chin are white.

== Reproduction ==
M. diana is oviparous.
