= Santiago de Chiquitos =

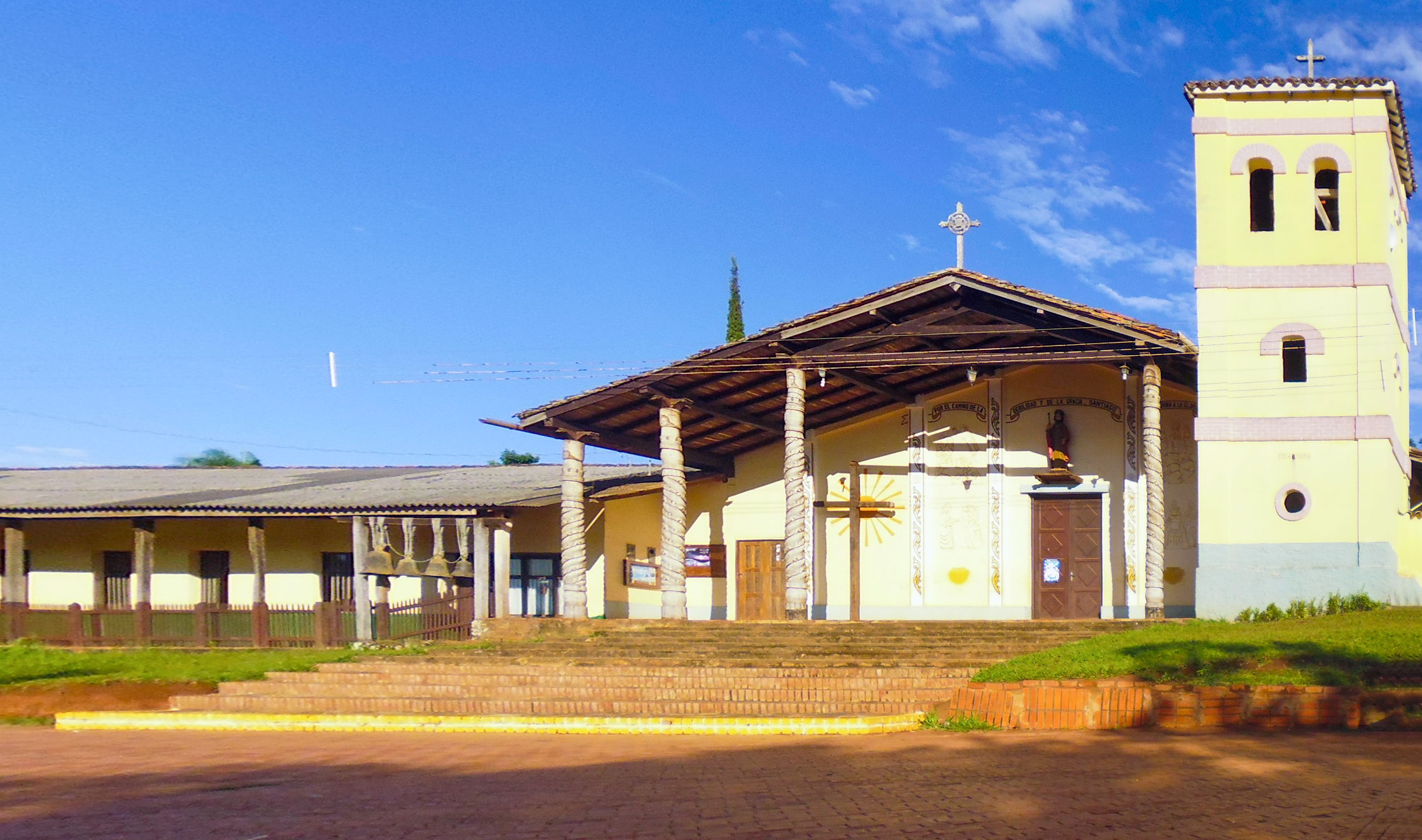
- Mission church of Santiago de Chiquitos

- Location within Bolivia
- Coordinates: 18°20′24″S 59°35′54″W
- Country: Bolivia
- Department: Santa Cruz Department
- Province: Chiquitos Province
- Municipality: Roboré Municipality
- Elevation: 2,041 ft (622 m)

Population (2012)
  - Total: 1,927
- Time zone: UTC-4 (BOT)

Santiago de Chiquitos is a small town in Roboré Municipality in Chiquitos Province, Santa Cruz Department, Bolivia. The mission of Santiago de Chiquitos is one of the Jesuit Missions of the Chiquitos.

The town is located 467 km east of the city of Santa Cruz de la Sierra and 22 km from the town of Roboré. It has a population of 1,927 as of the 2012 census, and is located within the Tucavaca Valley Municipal Reserve.

== History ==
In 1754, the Jesuit Mission of Santiago de Chiquitos was founded by Jesuit missionaries Gaspar Troncoso and Gaspar Campos.

== Languages ==
Camba Spanish is the most commonly used everyday language. The Santiagueño dialect of Chiquitano is also spoken in the town.

== Culture ==
The annual fiesta takes place on July 25. The town maintains religious musical traditions.

== See also ==
- List of Jesuit sites
- List of the Jesuit Missions of Chiquitos
