= Route 1 (Bolivia) =

Highway in Bolivia

Route 1
- Ruta 1

Route information
- Length: 1,168 km (726 mi)

Major junctions
- South end: Aguas Blancas International Bridge
- Route 28 in Padcaya; Route 11 near Tarija; Route 20 in El Puente; Route 14 near Belen; Route 5 in Potosi; Route 32 near Sirk'i; Route 30 near Challapata; Route 6 near Oruro; Route 12 in Oruro; Route 31 in Oruro; Route 4 in Caracollo; Route 4 in Patacamaya Municipality; Route 3 in La Paz; Route 2 in El Alto
- North end: Route 3S (Peru) at Desaguadero Border Crossing

Location
- Country: Bolivia

Highway system
- Highways of Bolivia; National Roads

Route 1 is a National Road in Bolivia.

Route 1 connects the Aguas Blancas International Bridge on the Argentine border to Desaguadero on the Peruvian border via Tarija, Potosi, Oruro, and La Paz.

== Route description ==
Route 1 has a length of 1,168 kilometers and runs in a northwest-southeast direction. Starting in the town of Bermejo, the road roughly follows the Rio Bermejo, branching off at one of its tributaries. Running north to the town of Padcaya, the road intersects Route 28 (Bolivia), and continues north into the valley surrounding Tarija, in which National Routes 45 and 11 meet.

After passing through Tarija as a parkway, the road continues, running west over the mountains to the rest of the city and meeting Route 20 in El Puente. Here, the highway bears north again, running through the Rio San Pedro. Bearing West again, the road intersects National Route 14, and then enters Potosi. In Potosi, Route 1 and Route 5 run concurrently through the city center, and Route 1 then continues northwest.

Continuing in this direction, Route 1 intersects Routes 32 and 30 near the town of Challapata. Route 1 then runs along the edge of Lago Poopo, joining Route 6 and entering Oruro. Joining the ring road, Route 1 continues for over 6 km before leaving on an independent route. In the town of Caracollo, Route 4 joins Route 1 and they remain concurrent for roughly 90 km before splitting in the town of Patyacama.

Continuing on, Route 1 continues roughly 90 km again to La Paz, where Route 19 joins it. Near El Alto International Airport, the road turns at a cloverleaf interchange, running west. The road runs through El Alto. Intersecting Route 2, the highway leaves the suburbs, and runs 95 km to Desaguadero.

== History ==
The first section of this road to be paved was between Oruro and Machacamarca between 1975 and 1977. It was reconstructed in 1995.

This road was included in the Fundamental Road Network by Supreme Decree 25,134 of August 31, 1998.
