= La Angostura, Santa Cruz =

Coordinates: 18.1625°S 63.5058°W

La Angostura
- Town
- Interactive map of La Angostura
- Country: Bolivia
- Time zone: UTC-4 (BOT)

La Angostura is a small town in Santa Cruz, Bolivia that lies along Route 7, southwest of San Luis.

It formed as a result of the highway connecting the Santa Cruz and Cochabamba departments.
