= Route 4 (Bolivia) =

Road in Bolivia

Route 4
- Ruta 4

Route information
- Length: 1,657 km (1,030 mi)

Major junctions
- West end: Tambo Quemado
- East end: Puerto Suárez, 10 km from Brazilian border

Location
- Country: Bolivia

Highway system
- Highways of Bolivia; National Roads
← Route 3	→ Route 5

Route 4 is a National Road in Bolivia. It is 1,657 kilometres in length, and crosses Bolivia from west to east, from the Cordillera Occidental on the Chilean border to the lowlands by the Brazilian border.

Route 4 was declared part of the Bolivian National Road Network by Decree 25.134 of 31 August 1998.

== Route ==
Route 4 encompasses the departments of Oruro, La Paz, Cochabamba and Santa Cruz. It begins in the west as a continuation of the Chilean Ruta 11, at Tambo Quemado and terminates in the east in the town of Puerto Suárez. From here, Puerto Busch is accessible.

Roue 4 was declared part of the Bolivian National Road Network by Decree 25.134 of 31 August 1998.

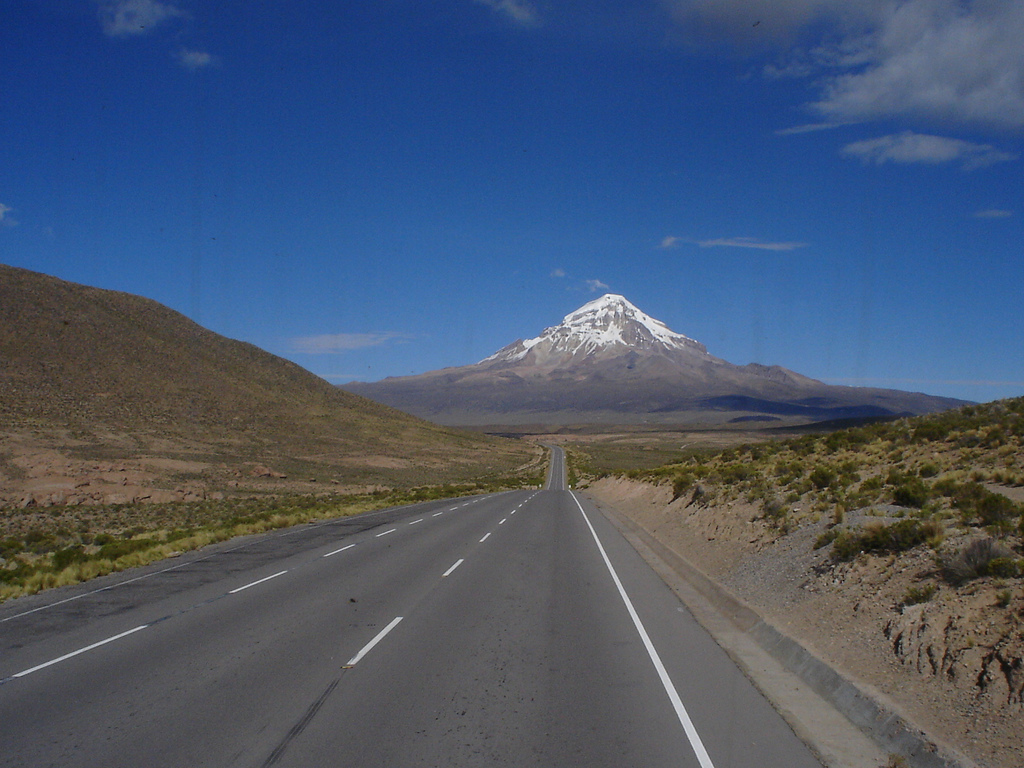
Ruta 4

=== Sections ===
==== Oruro Department ====
- 0 km - Tambo Quemado
- 20 km - Sajama
- 93 km - Curahuara de Carangas

==== La Paz Department ====
- 132 km - bridge over Rio Desaguadero
- 134 km - Callapa
- 188 km - Patacamaya

==== Oruro Department ====
- 188 km - Caracollo
- 196 km - Villa Pata
- 205 km - Ocotavi
- 211 km - Cohani
- 218 km - Lequepalca

==== La Paz Department ====
- 226 km - Huayllamarca

==== Cochabamba Department ====
- 242 km - Lacolaconi
- 252 km - Japo Kasa
- 260 km - Tallija Confital
- 271 km - Challa Grande
- 284 km - Pongo Kasa
- 288 km - Kjarkas
- 290 km - Kallani Centro
- 299 km - Huarancaiza
- 305 km - Kochi Pampas
- 315 km - Llavini
- 337 km - Pirque
- 339 km - Parotani
- 345 km - Sipe Sipe
- 357 km - Vinto
- 364 km - Quillacollo
- 377 km - Cochabamba
- 393 km - Sacaba
- 425 km - Colomi
- 507 km - Puente Esperitu Santo II
- 539km - Villa Tunari
- 558 km - Shinahota
- 568 km - Chimoré
- 599 km - Ivirgarzama
- 644 km - Entre Ríos
- 665 km - Bulo Bulo

==== Santa Cruz Department ====
- 685 km - Nuevo Horizons
- 697 km - San German
- 704 km - El Palmar
- 712 km - San Isidro Chore
