= Transport in Bolivia =

Transport in Bolivia is mostly by road. The railways were historically important in Bolivia, but now play a relatively small part in the country's transport system. Because of the country's geography, aviation is also important.

== Railways ==
Total: 3,504 km (single track)
Narrow gauge (metre gauge):

- 3,504 km 1,000 mm (3 ft 3 3/8 in) gauge; (2006)
- The eastern and western networks are joined only via Argentina, due to slow progress on a direct link.
  - The map on page 522 of the 1969/1970 edition of JANE'S shows a link between Cuevos and Zudañez as being "under construction".

=== Rail links with adjacent countries ===
- Argentina – yes – 1,000 mm (3 ft 3 3/8 in) both countries
- Brazil – yes – 1,000 mm gauge both countries
- Chile – yes – 1,000 mm gauge both countries; break of gauge where Chile is 1,676 mm (5 ft 6 in) gauge
- Peru – Shipping from 1,000 mm railhead in Guaqui to 1,435 mm (4 ft 8 1/2 in) railhead in Puno across Lake Titicaca, see Peru train ferry

=== Maps ===
- UN Map

=== Light Rail ===
The first light rail network in Bolivia, the Mi Tren in Cochabamba, began construction in 2017 and was initially intended to be completed by 2020. However, it was delayed in 2019 and came online in 2022.

== Cable Car ==
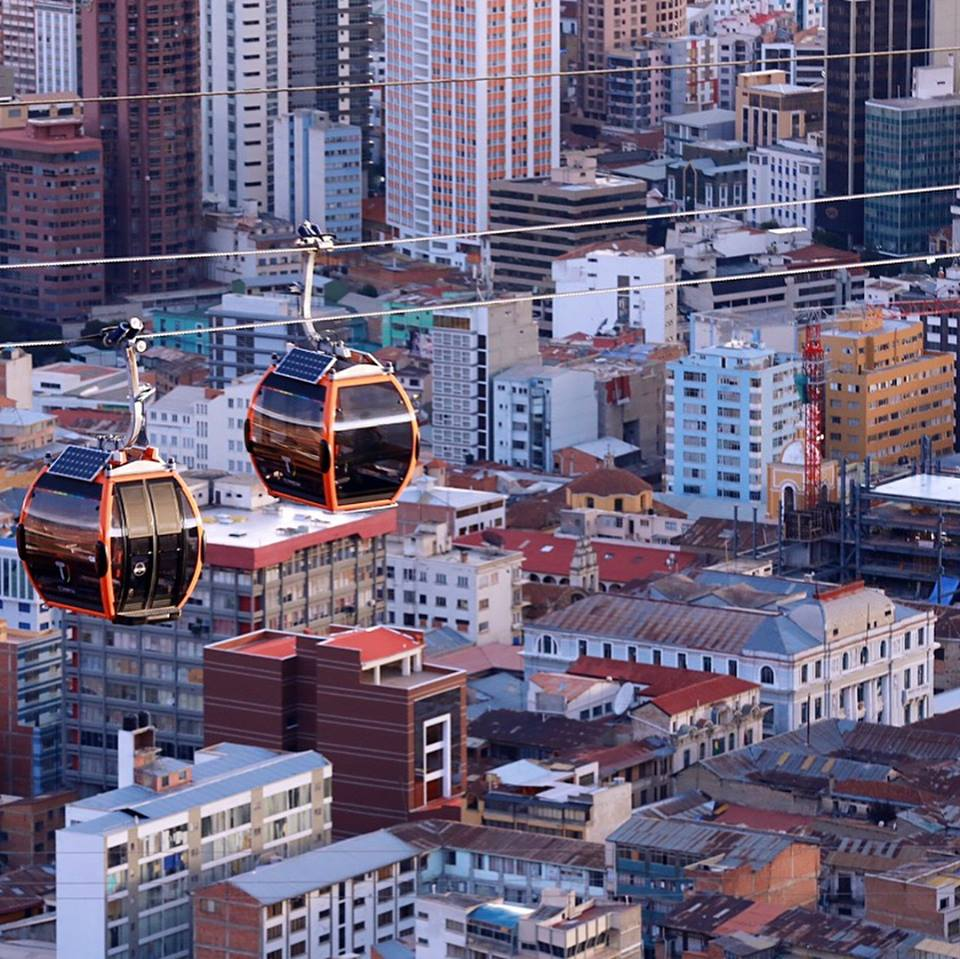
La Paz' Mi Teleférico, finished in 2014.

Bolivia is home to Mi Teleférico, the world's first urban transit network to use cable cars as the primary mode of transportation. This system services the twin cities of El Alto and La Paz, and increased physical and social mobility within Bolivia.

== Roadways ==
Bolivia as of 2004 has 62,479 km of road distance, of which 3,749 km (including 27 km of expressways) is paved and 58,730 km is unpaved.

Road construction in Bolivia is difficult due to its geography and lack of resources to completely develop an advanced road network. However, it maintains a small network of 4-lane freeways which are the following:

- 1 Oruro – Patacamaya (Expected to be completed in a few years, extending to La Paz). Length: 114 km.
- 4 Cochabamba – Quillacollo. Length: 14 km.
- 4 Santa Cruz de la Sierra – Montero. Length: 48 km.

The main national roads are:

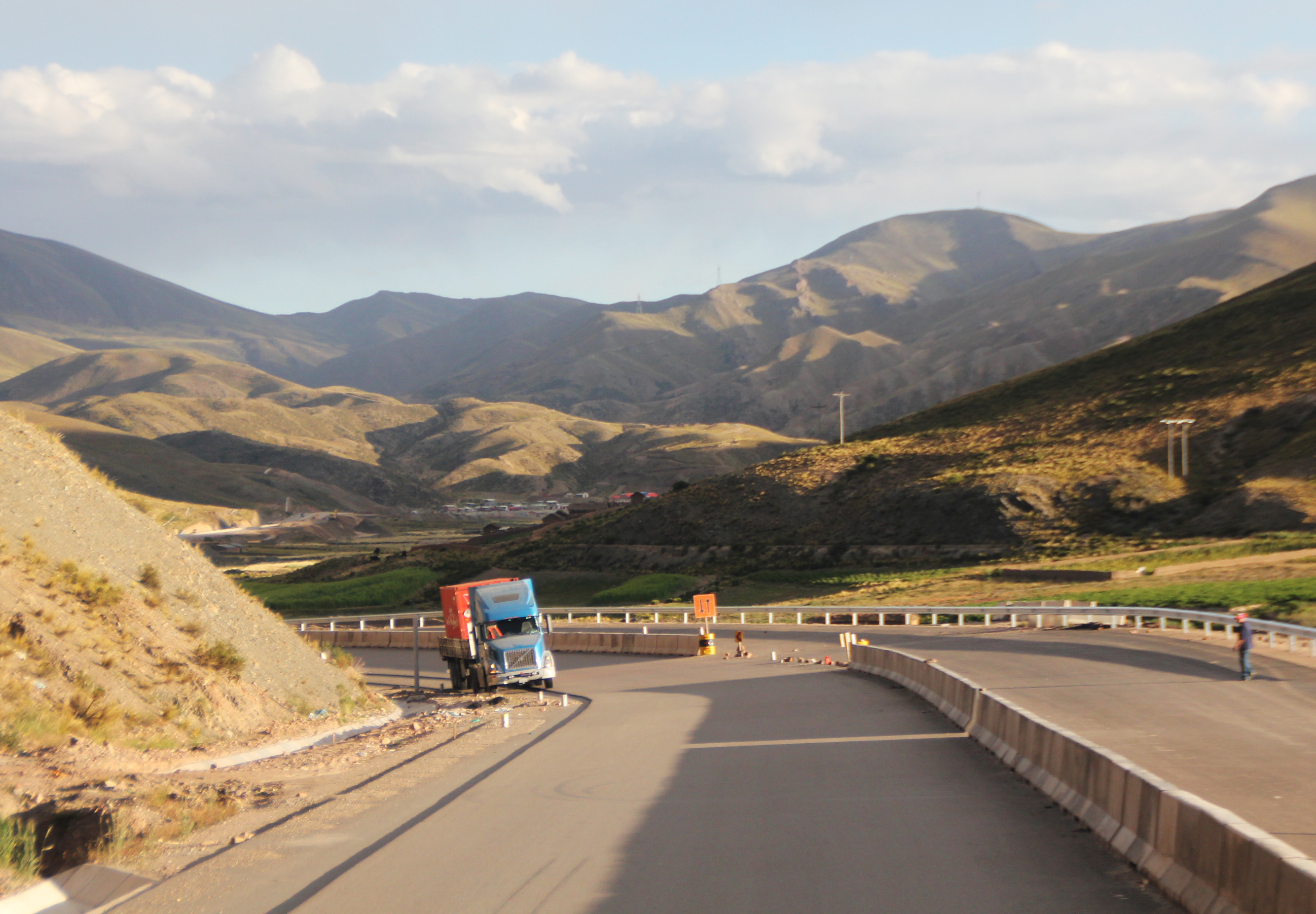
Ruta nacional 4 (RN4) entering Oruro Department

- RN1 Desaguadero, border with Peru – La Paz – Oruro – Potosí – Tarija – Bermejo, border with Argentina.
- RN2 Copacabana, border with Peru – La Paz.
- RN3 La Paz – San Borja – Trinidad.
- RN4 Tambo Quemado, border with Chile – Cochabamba – Montero – Santa Cruz de la Sierra – Puerto Suárez, border with Brazil.
- RN5 La Palizada – Sucre – Potosí – Border with Chile.
- RN6 Oruro – Sucre – Chaco, border with Paraguay.
- RN7 Cochabamba – Samaipata – Santa Cruz de la Sierra.
- RN8 Yucumo – Riberalta – Guayaramerín, border with Brazil.
- RN9 Guayaramerín, border with Brazil – Trinidad – Santa Cruz de la Sierra – Yacuíba, border with Argentina
- RN10 Montero – San Matías, border with Brazil.
- RN 14 Potosí – Villazón, border with Argentina.

The Interoceanic Highway is an important highway that connects the Amazonian tripoint border region of Brazil, Peru and Bolivia to the Pacific Ocean. Bolivia's northernmost capital, Cobija, headquarters a free economic zone that uses the Interoceanic Highway to import and export most of its products.

== Waterways ==
10,000 km of commercially navigable waterways (2007)

== Ports and harbors ==
=== Seaports ===
- In October 2010, Peru granted Bolivia port facilities and a free-trade zone as part of larger series of agreements strengthening bilateral relations between the two countries. Bolivia was granted about 1.4 square miles (3.6 km^{2}) of port facilities on a 99-year lease at the Port of Ilo on Peru's southern Pacific coast. A similar agreement, signed by then Bolivian president Jaime Paz Zamora in 1992, never materialized for a lack of investment in infrastructure. Bolivia has free port privileges in the maritime ports of Argentina, Brazil, and Chile.

=== Lake Titicaca ===
- Guaqui

=== Amazon basin ===
- Puerto Guayamerin
- Puerto Suárez
- Riberalta
- San Pedro de Tiquina
- Puerto Horquilla
- Puerto Villarroel
- Trinidad
- Rurrenabaque

=== Paraguay River (international waterway) ===
- Puerto Aguirre
- Puerto Busch
- Puerto Quijarro

== Merchant marine ==
There is a total of 23 ships (1,000 gross tonnage (GT) or over) totaling 116,373 GT/182,283 tonnes deadweight (DWT) in Bolivia.
Ships by type as below: (2008)

- Bulk carriers 1
- Cargo ships 11
- Carrier ships 1
- Chemical tankers 3
- Passenger/cargo ships 1
- Petroleum tanker 7
- Reefer ships 1
- Specialized tankers 1

== Airports ==
There are 1,009 airports in Bolivia as of 2008.

Airports – with paved runways:
total: 16
over 3,047 m: 4
2,438 to 3,047 m: 4
1,524 to 2,437 m: 5
914 to 1,523 m: 3 (2008)

Airports – with unpaved runways:
total: 993
over 3,047 m: 1
2,438 to 3,047 m: 4
1,524 to 2,437 m: 58
914 to 1,523 m: 186
under 914 m: 744 (2008)

== Pipelines ==
- Crude oil 2,745 km
- Liquid petroleum gas 47 km
- Natural gas 4,883 km
- Refined products 1,589 (2008)

== See also ==
- Bolivia
- Rail transport by country
