= Yungas Road =

National Road in Bolivia, known for its treacherous journey

Coordinates: 16.290253°S 67.827126°W

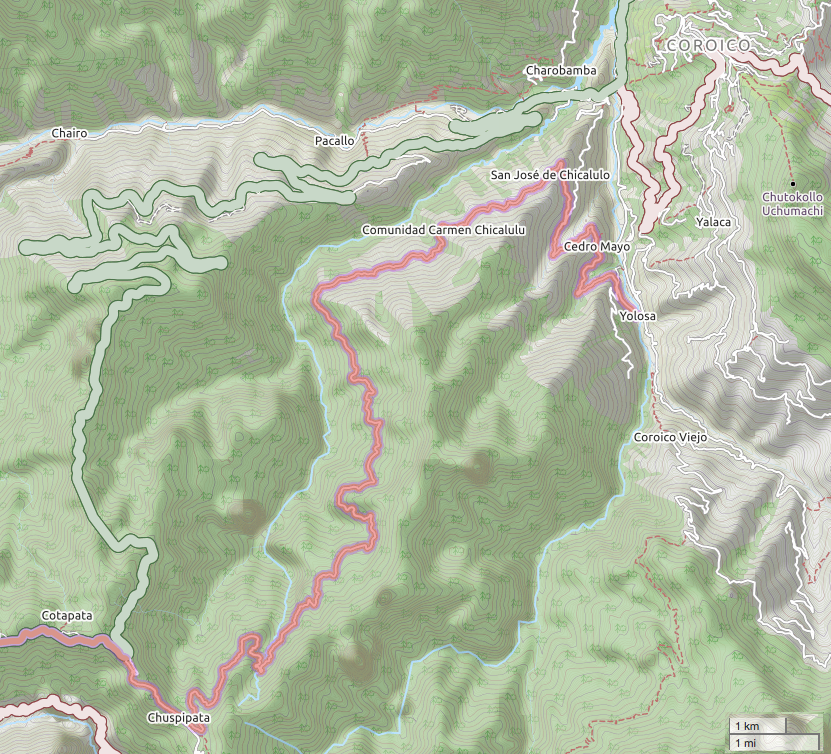
In red the cycling section, in green the Bolivian National Route 3

The Yungas Road (Spanish: Camino a los Yungas), commonly referred to as Death Road (Spanish: Camino de la Muerte), is a 64-kilometer (40 mi) long cycle and vehicle route linking La Paz, Bolivia, with the Yungas region. It was built in the 1930s by the Bolivian government. Large amounts of its construction were done by Paraguayan prisoners during the Chaco War. Several sections of the road are less than 3 meters (9.8 ft) wide. Due to its steep slopes and cliffs coupled with the common occurrence of rain, fog, landslides, and cascades, it is largely considered the most dangerous road in the world.

Unlike in the rest of the country, the Yungas Road is a left-hand traffic road, which allowed drivers to better gauge the distance between their vehicles and the edge of the road. It was replaced in the 1990s by Route 3, a two-lane asphalt road featuring guardrails and drainage systems.

Known for its extreme danger with 3,500 metres (11,500 ft) of descent, the Death Road draws about 25,000 tourists per year and has become a popular destination for adventure tourism, particularly mountain biking. Until Route 3 opened, the crash rate on the road was between 200 and 300 deaths per year. At least 18 cyclists have died on the road since 1998.

== History ==
Parts of the Yungas road were built by Paraguayan prisoners that were captured after the Chaco War in the 1930s. It is of one of the few routes that connect the Amazon jungle in the north with La Paz. An alternative route, now part of Route 3, was built during a 20-year period ending in 2006. The modernization included enlarging the carriageway from one to two lanes; asphalt paving; bridges, drainage, guardrails, and the building of a new section between Chusquipata and Yolosa, bypassing the most dangerous sections of the original road. The resulting North Yungas Road is now mainly used for bicycles, motorcycles, and walking. Up until 2006, the North Yungas Road was the sole route for traveling from Coroico to La Paz. In 2009, the Bolivian government built a new road along the adjacent mountain range. The asphalt road features two lanes, drainage systems and guardians.

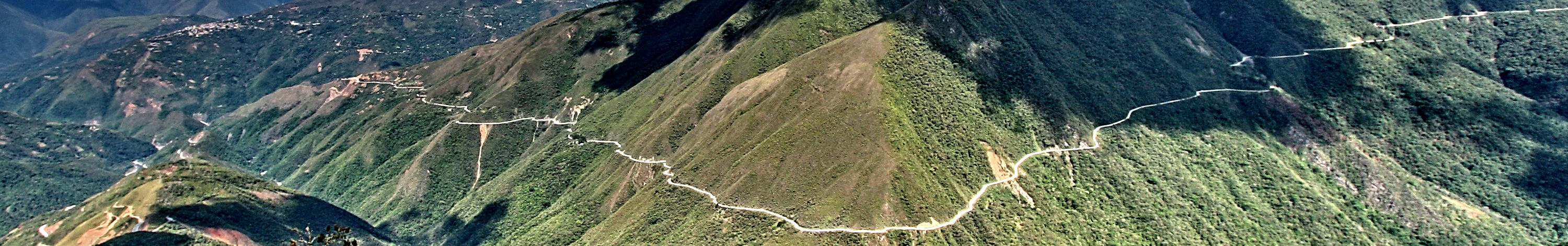
Panoramic view of the North Yungas Road, commonly known as the Death Road, connecting the Yungas region with La Paz, Bolivia.

== Traffic violence ==
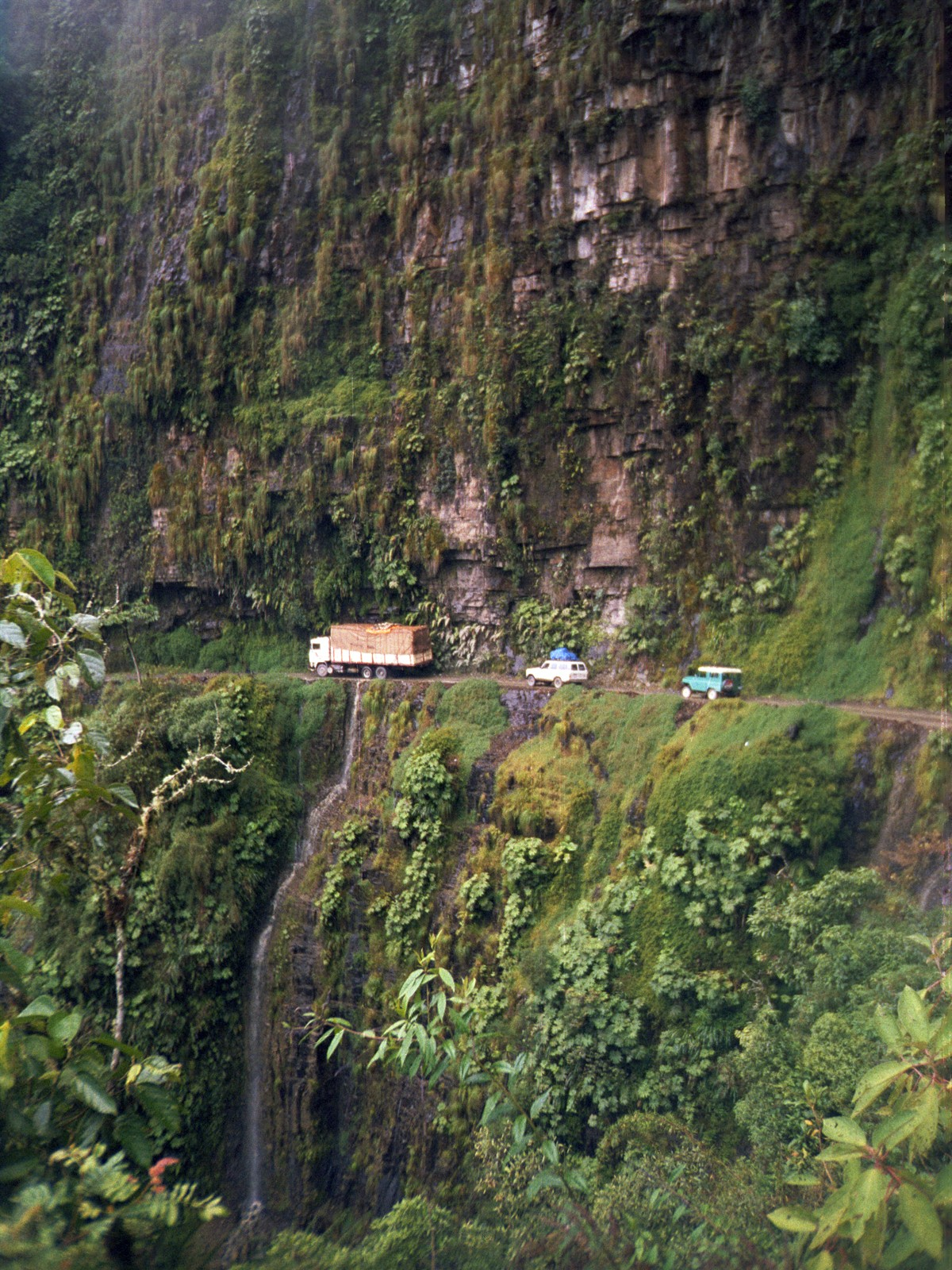
Vehicles driving on the road

Because of the steep slopes, the lack of guardrails, and the narrow width of the road (as little as 3 meters (9.8 ft) in some places), the road was especially dangerous for vehicular traffic. Weather conditions further increased the danger; rain and fog would reduce visibility, while muddy terrain and loose stones could impair traction. It was famous for its dangerous conditions and deaths from traffic crashes, averaging around 209 crashes and 96 deaths per year. In 1995, the Inter-American Development Bank dubbed it the most dangerous road in the world.

In July 1983, a bus fell from the Yungas Road into a canyon, killing more than 100 passengers in one of the worst road crashes in Bolivia. Until the mid-1990s, the crash rate was even worse, with 200 to 300 drivers falling off the cliff each year. In 2011, the total number of crashes was around 114, the second most in Bolivia after the road between La Paz and Oruro. Of these crashes, 42 people died.

== Gallery ==
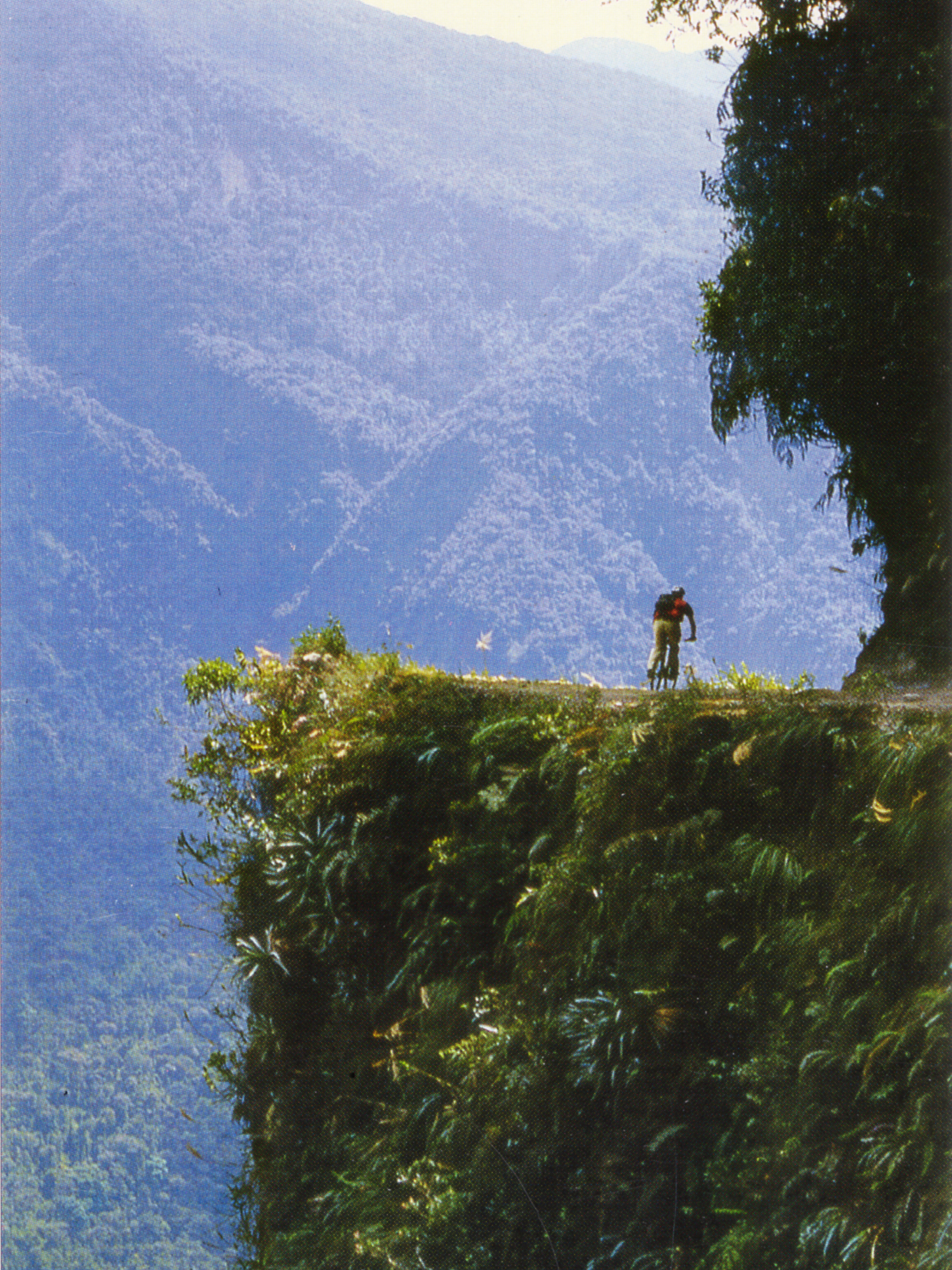
A cliff along the road

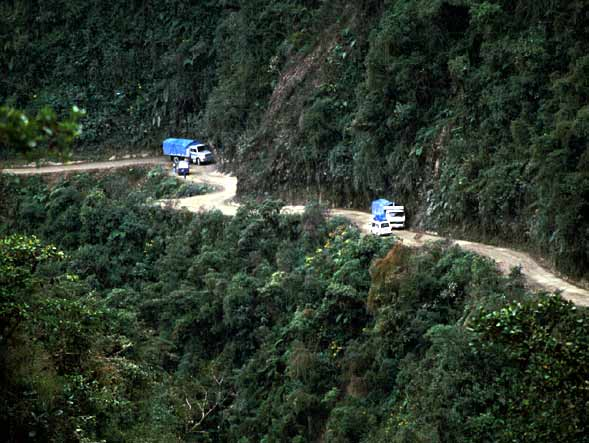
The old North Yungas Road before the new road opened

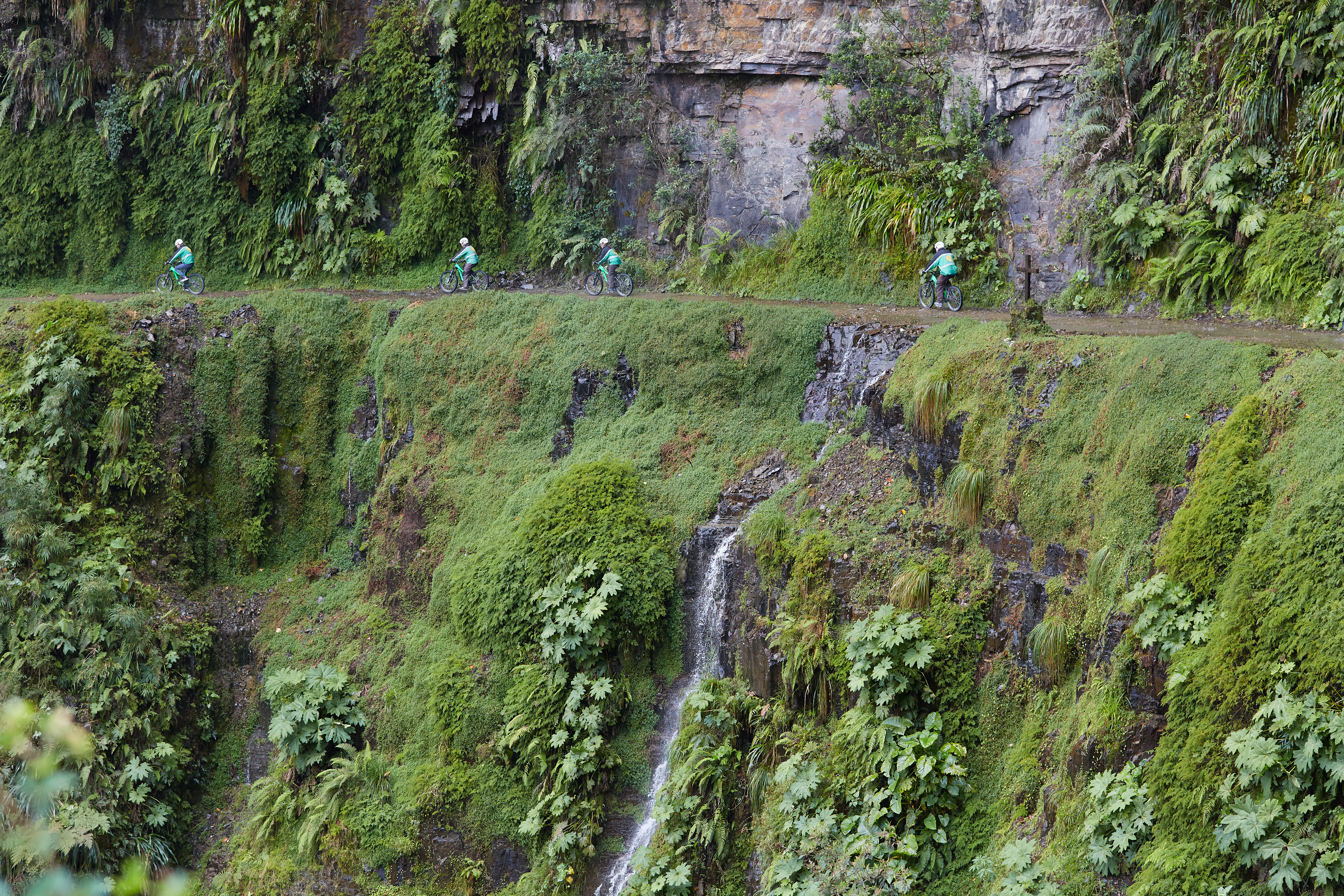
Tourists mountain-biking downhill
