= Chiquitos Province =

Chiquitos
- Province
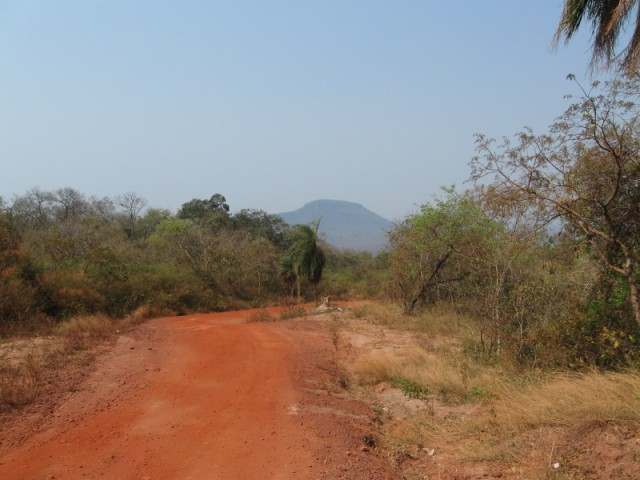
- Road in Santa Cruz la Vieja historical park with the mountain Turubó in the background, San José Municipality, Chiquitos Province

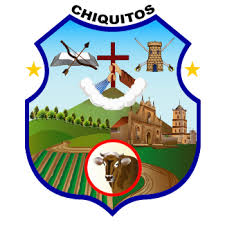
- Flag Coat of arms

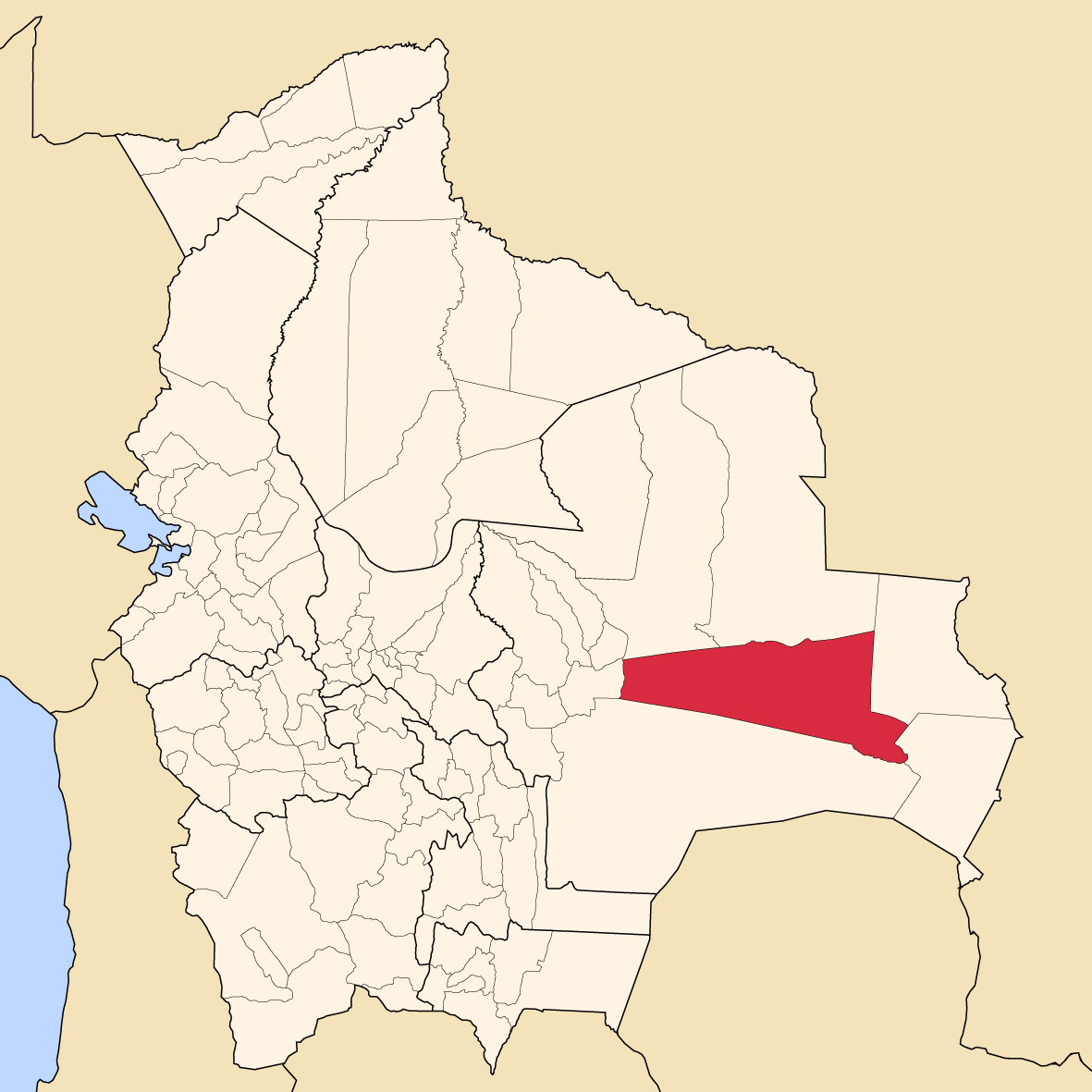
- Location of Chiquitos Province within Bolivia

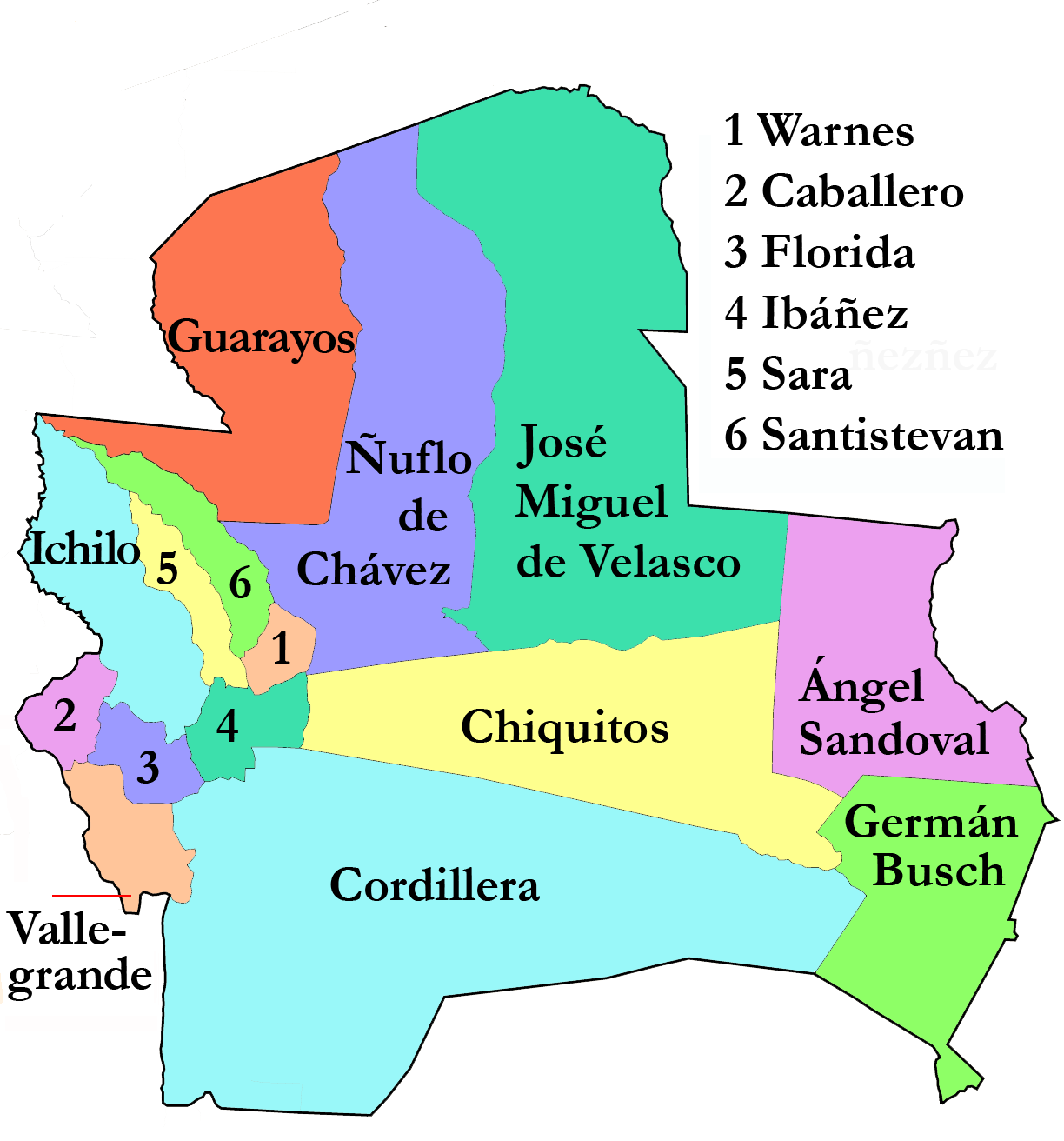
- Provinces of Santa Cruz Department
- Coordinates: 18°0′S 60°0′W
- Country: Bolivia
- Department: Santa Cruz Department
- Cantons: 9
- Foundation: January 23, 1826
- Capital: San José de Chiquitos

Area
  - Total: 12,135 sq mi (31,429 km^{2})
- Elevation: 971 ft (296 m)

Population (2024 census)
  - Total: 114,019
  - Density: 9.3960/sq mi (3.6278/km^{2})
- Time zone: UTC-4 (BOT)
- Area code: BO.SC.CQ
- Website: www.santacruz.gob.bo

Chiquitos Province is one of the fifteen provinces of the Bolivian Santa Cruz Department, situated in the center of the department. Its capital is San José de Chiquitos.

The province was created on January 23, 1826, during the presidency of marshal Antonio José de Sucre.

It forms the so-called "Gran Chiquitania" together with José Miguel de Velasco Province, Ñuflo de Chávez Province, Ángel Sandoval Province, and Germán Busch Province.

== Location ==
Chiquitos Province is located between 17° 00' and 18° 37' South and between 58° 54' and 62° 45' West. It extends over 500 km from West to East, and up to 220 km from North to South.

The province is situated in the Bolivian lowlands and borders Ñuflo de Chávez Province in the northwest, Andrés Ibáñez Province in the west, Cordillera Province in the south, Germán Busch Province in the southeast, Ángel Sandoval Province in the east, and José Miguel de Velasco Province in the north.

== Division ==
Chiquitos Province comprises three municipalities which are further subdivided into cantons.

Section	Municipality	Seat
1st	San José de Chiquitos Municipality	San José de Chiquitos
2nd	Pailón Municipality	Pailón
3rd	Roboré Municipality	Roboré

== Demographics ==
The population of Chiquitos Province has increased by circa 15% over the recent five years, from 59,754 inhabitants (2001 census) to 68,445 inhabitants (2005 est.). A substantial part of the population consists of German speaking Mennonites from Russia.

The latest census in Bolivia (2024) counted 114,019 people (101.991, aged 4 and over) in the province, out of which 33,299 were German-speaking Mennonites aged 4 and over or 32.7% of the entire population.

== Environment ==
Increased agricultural use of the land has led to deforestation in the area.

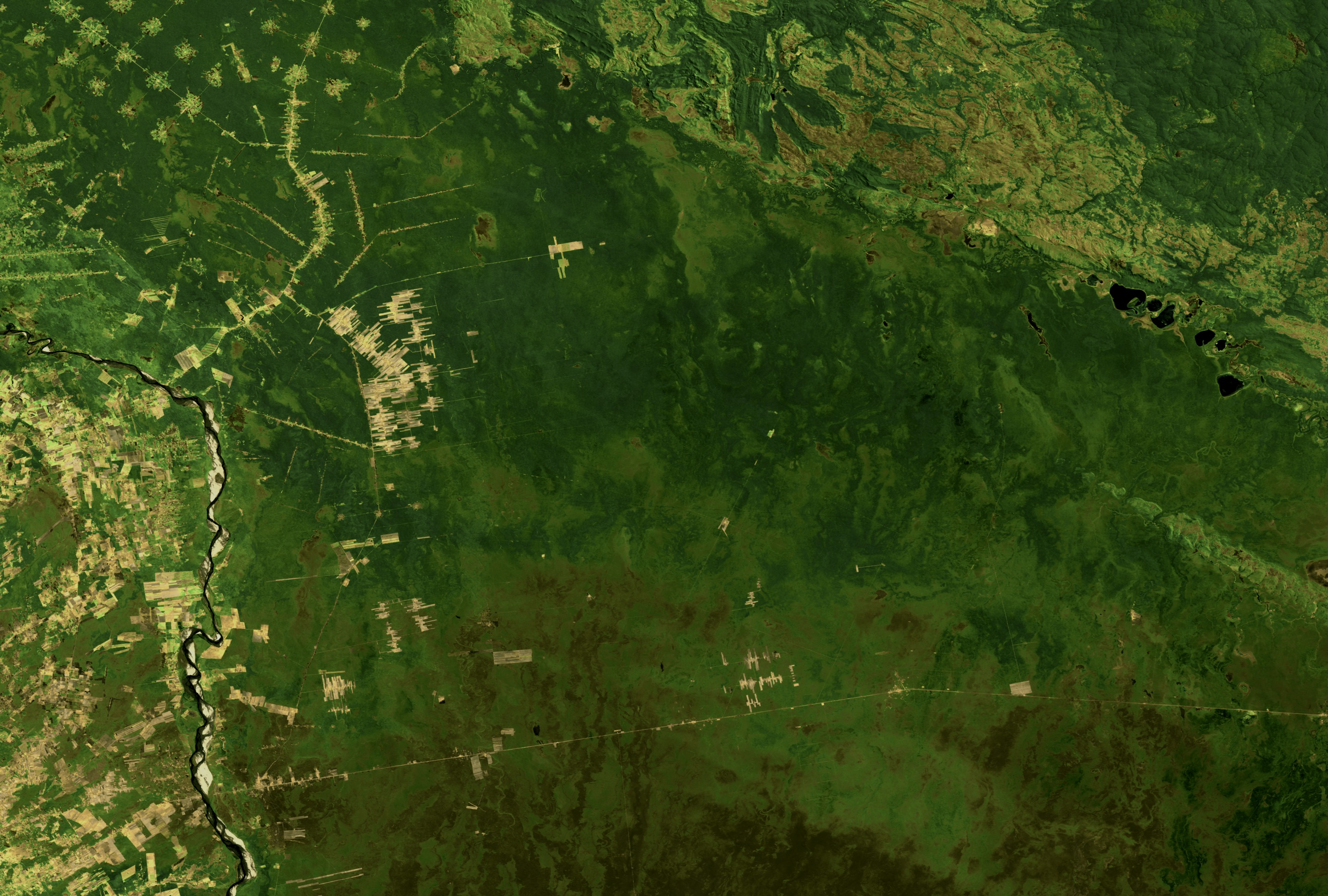
1984

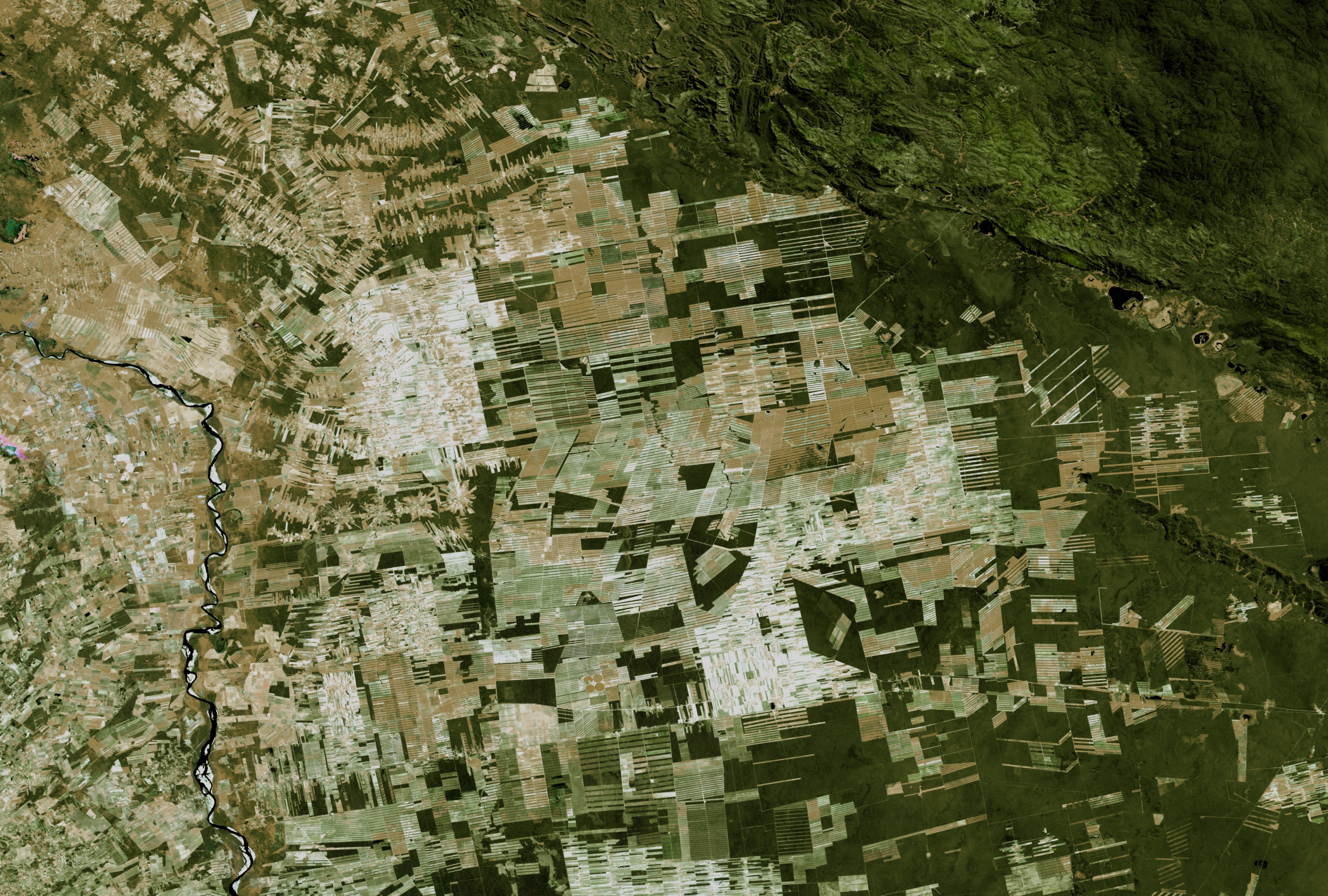
2000

Satellite images of western Chiquitos and southern Ñuflo de Chávez provinces illustrate deforestation from agrarian expansion.

== Places of interest ==
- Kaa-Iya del Gran Chaco National Park and Integrated Management Natural Area
- Tucavaca Valley Municipal Reserve

== Gallery ==
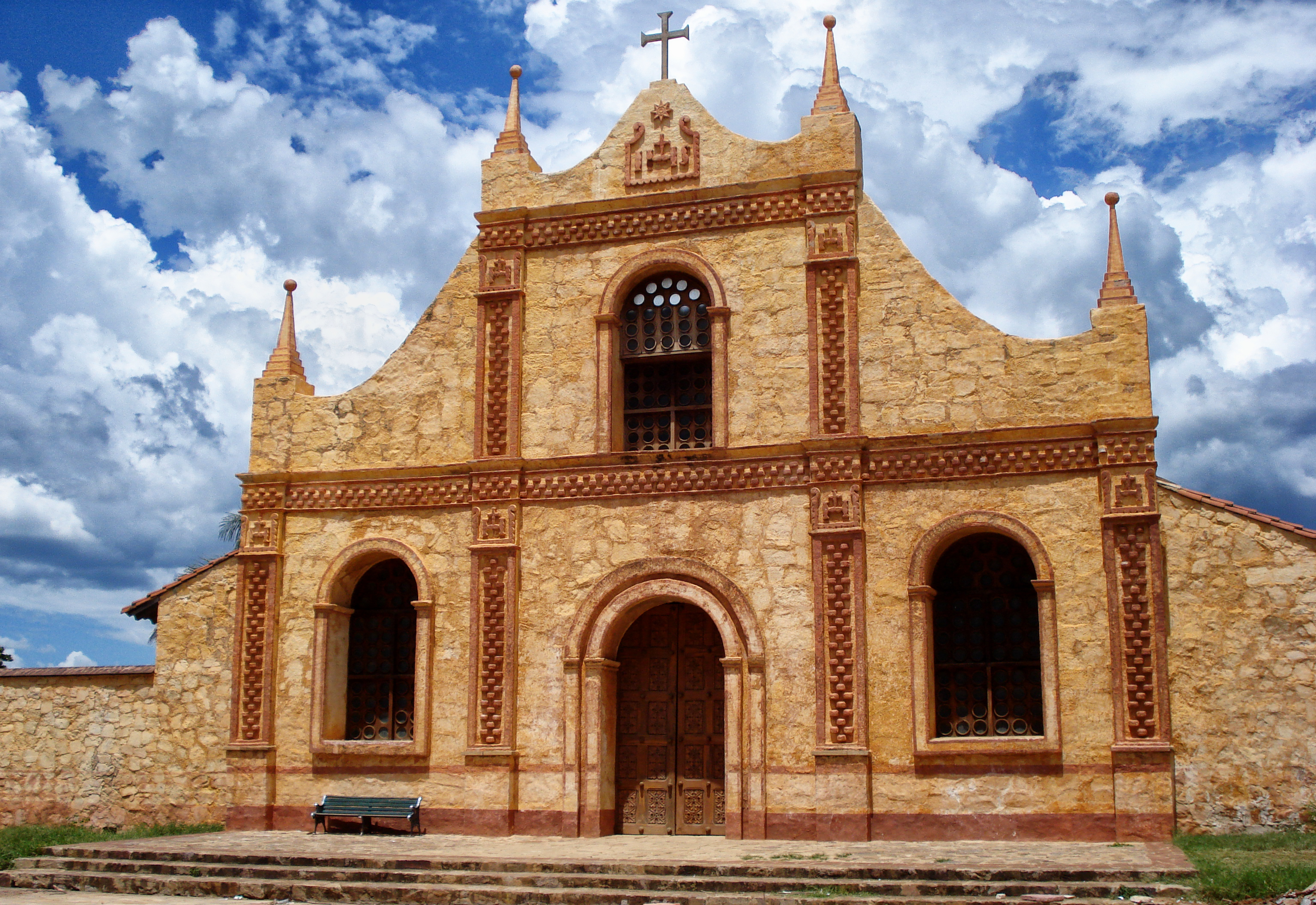
San José de Chiquitos mission church

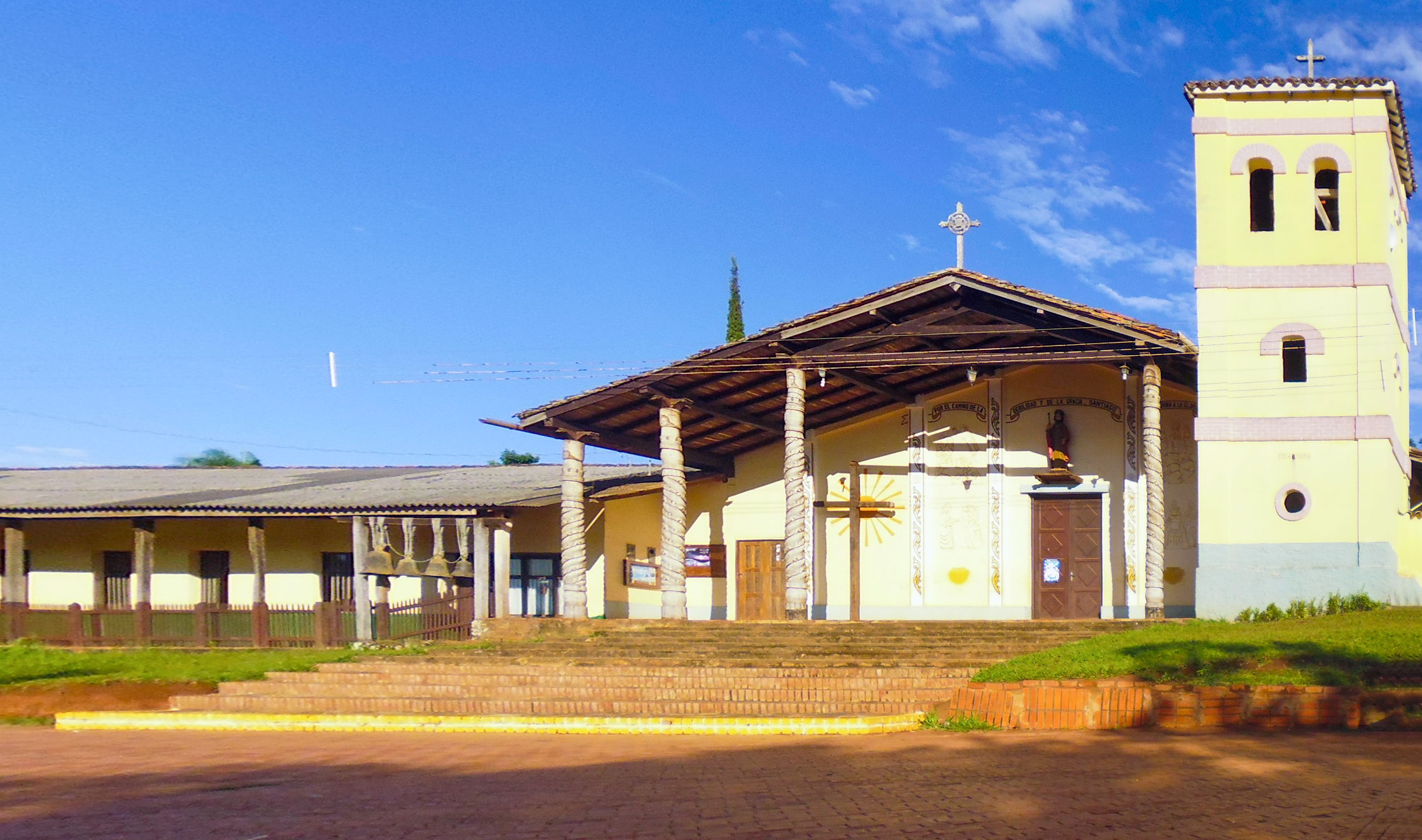
Santiago de Chiquitos mission church

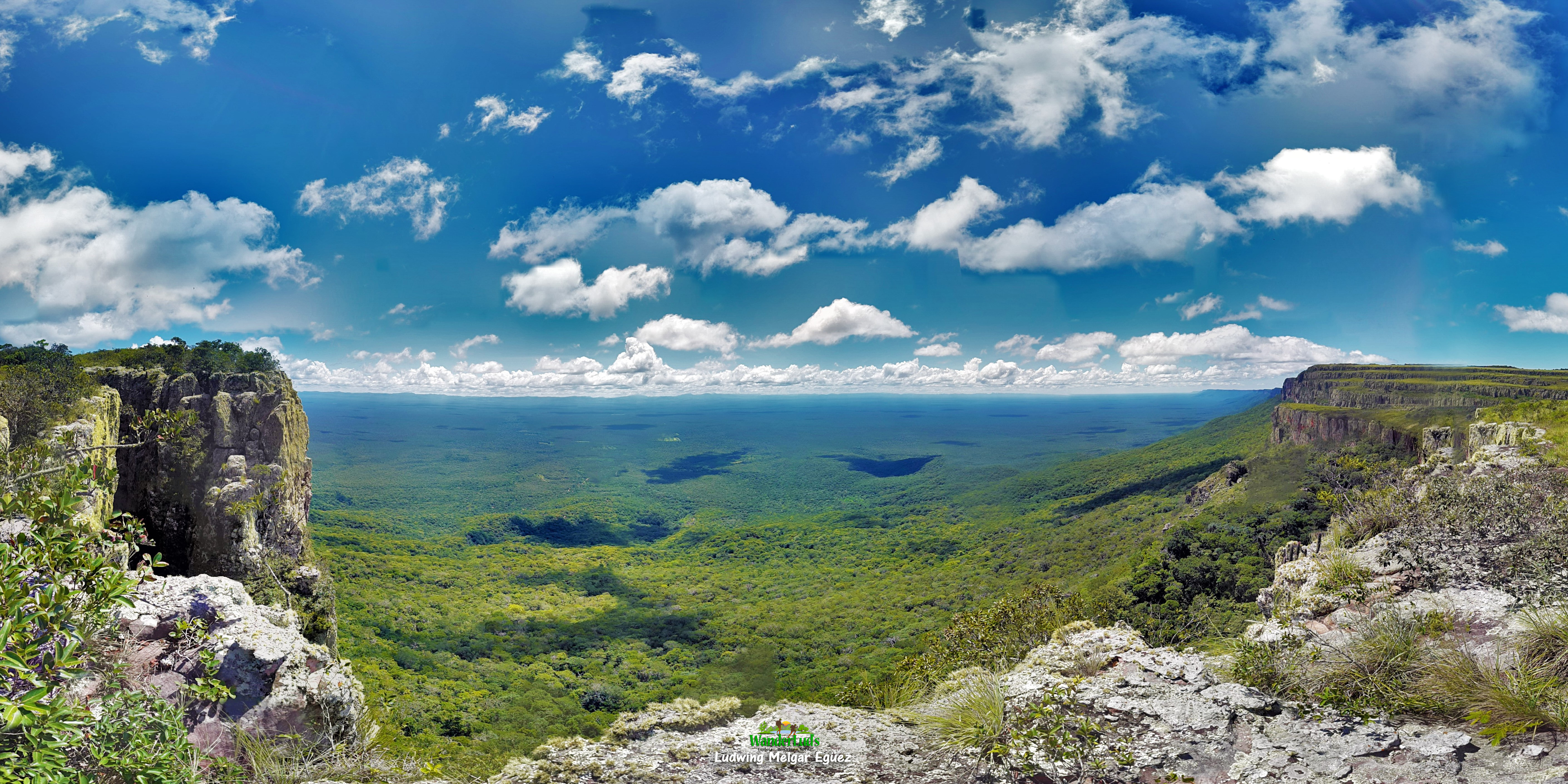
Tucavaca Valley Municipal Reserve
