= List of national roads in Bolivia =

The Bolivian National Road network (Spanish: Rutas Nacionales) comprises 16,029 km (as of 2006) of roadway across all of Bolivia.

The National Road network was established with the Decreto Supremo 25.134 of 21 August 1998, with a length of 10,401 kilometres, consisting of 17 national roads. Today, there are 45 national roads in total. Route 16 still does not exist continuously, as such measurements of its length are estimated.

Bolivia's National Road network is 28% (4,514 km) paved, 40% (6,455 km) gravel, and 32% (5,060 km) compacted and beaten earth.

Since the climate, especially in the Bolivian lowlands, is characterized by extended rainy seasons, this situation repeatedly leads to poor traffic conditions, making mudslides, road traffic collisions, and fatalities commonplace.

== List of routes ==
Number	Length (km)	Length (mi)	Southern or western terminus	Northern or eastern terminus	Formed	Removed
Route 1	1215	755	International bridge at Bermejo	International bridge at Desaguadero	1998	current
Route 2	142	88	International border at Khasani	Route 1 in El Alto	1998	current
Route 3	602	374	Route 1 in El Alto	Route 9 in El AltoTrinidad	1998	current
Route 4	1657	1,030	International border near Jancoaque	International border at Puerto Quijarro	1998	current
Route 5	—	—	—	—	1998	current
Route 6	—	—	—	—	1998	current
Route 7	—	—	—	—	1998	current
Route 8	—	—	—	—	1998	current
Route 9	—	—	—	—	1998	current
Route 10	—	—	—	—	1998	current
Route 11	—	—	—	—	1998	current
Route 12	—	—	—	—	1998	current
Route 13	—	—	—	—	1998	current
Route 14	—	—	—	—	1998	current
Route 15	—	—	—	—	1998	current
Route 16	—	—	—	—	1998	current
Route 17	—	—	—	—	1998	current
Route 18	—	—	—	—	1998	current
Route 19	—	—	—	—	2001	current
Route 20	—	—	—	—	2001	current
Route 21	—	—	—	—	2001	current
Route 22	—	—	—	—	—	—
Route 23	—	—	—	—	—	—
