= Tucavaca Valley Municipal Reserve =

Protected area in Bolivia

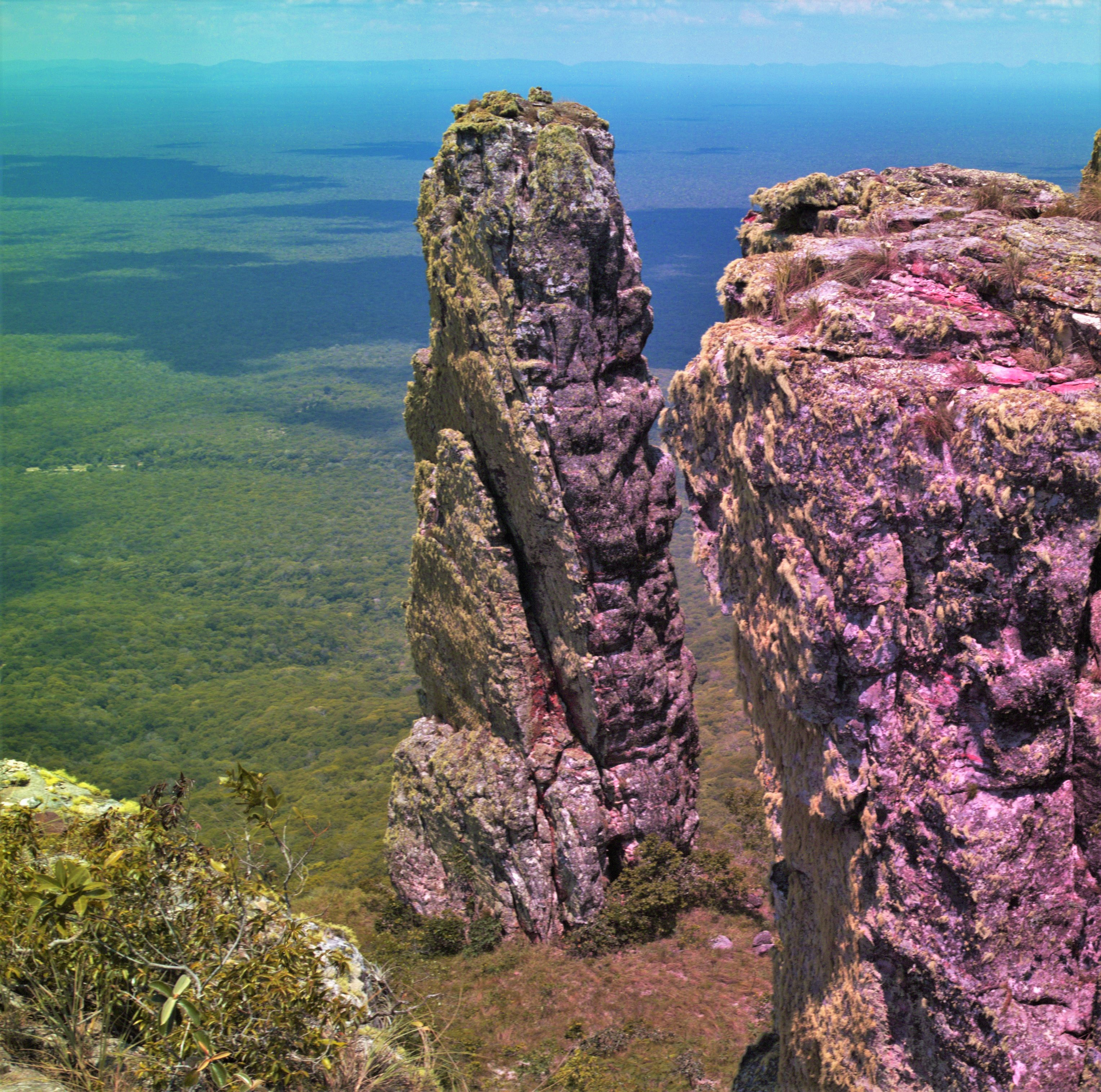
- Location: Bolivia; Santa Cruz Department, Chiquitos Province
- Area: 246,054 ha (608,010 acres)
- Established: 2000

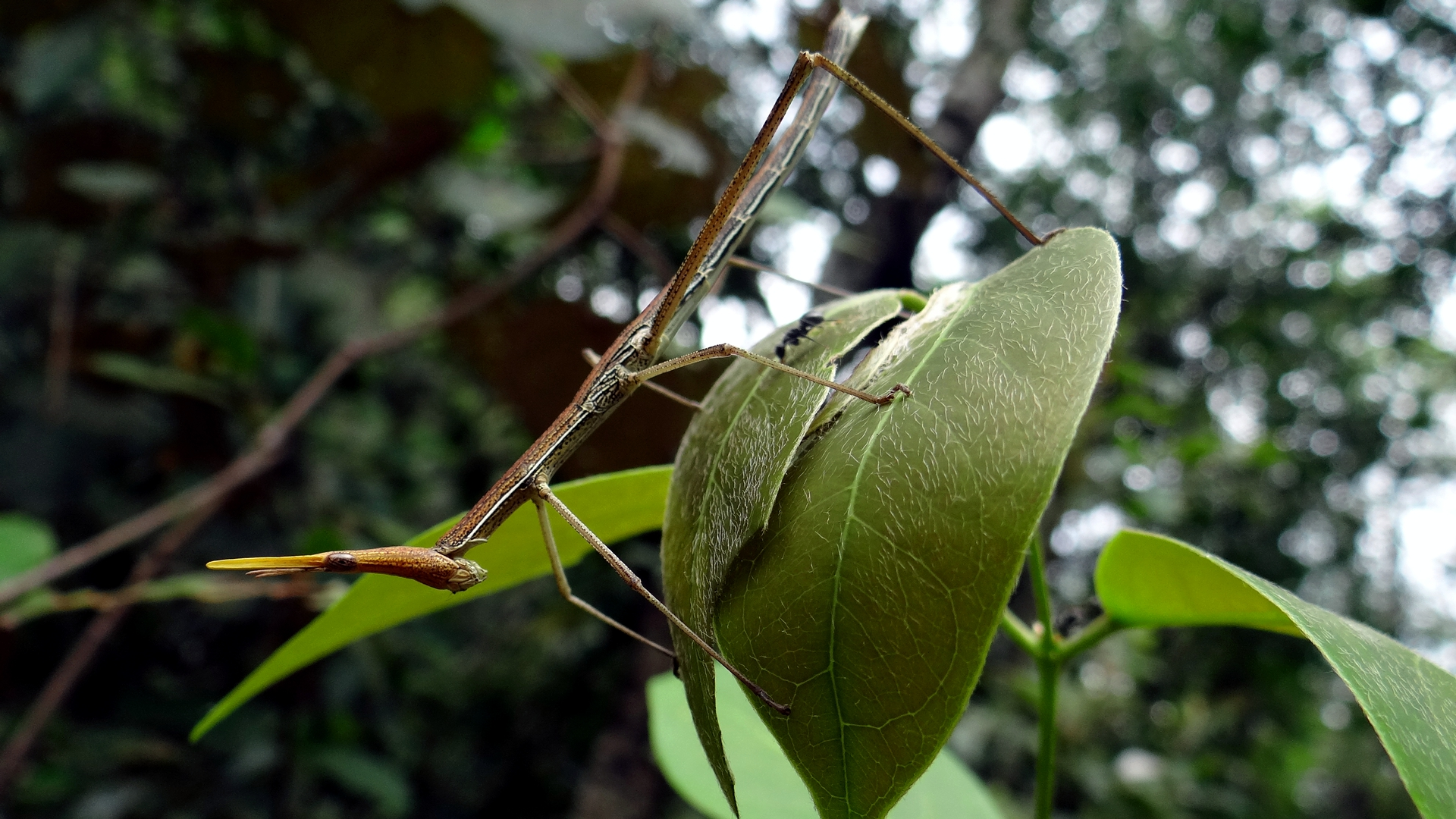
Stick insect in the reserve

Tucavaca Valley Municipal Reserve (Reserva Municipal Valle de Tucavaca) is a protected area in Bolivia situated in the Santa Cruz Department, Chiquitos Province, Roboré Municipality. The reserve is located at an altitude between 200 m and 1250 m above sea level (Mount Chochís). It comprises the Santiago mountain range (Serranía de Santiago) and the Tucavaca valley.

The historical Jesuit mission and town of Santiago de Chiquitos is located within the reserve.
