= Route 8 (Bolivia) =

Highway in Bolivia

Route 8
- Ruta 8

Route information
- Length: 696 km (432 mi)

Location
- Country: Bolivia

Highway system
- Highways of Bolivia; National Roads

Route 8 is a National Road in the Beni Department of Bolivia. It runs for 696 kilometres from Guayaramerín to Yucumo, where the Route 3 can be joined.

== Route ==
Route 8 crosses the western area of the Beni Department in a north-south direction, from Guayaramerin to Yucumo. It begins in the Bolivian lowlands on the border with Brazil and runs roughly parallel to the Beni River along the Moxos plains in the Beni savannah to the eastern edge of the Bolivian forelands.

The northernmost section of Route 8, from Guayaramerin to Riberalta is paved, as is the southernmost section, from Yucumo to Rurrenabaque. There are plans in place to continue asphalting the unpaved sections, so that the entire Route 8 is paved.

== History ==
Route 8 was declared a Bolivian National Road under the Network "Red Vial Fundamental" by Decree 25.134 of 31 August 1998.
