= San Luis, Santa Cruz =

Coordinates: 18.1417°S 63.4797°W

San Luis
- Town
- Interactive map of San Luis
- Country: Bolivia
- Time zone: UTC-4 (BOT)

San Luis is a small town in Santa Cruz, Bolivia that lies along Route 7, between La Angostura and Tiquipaya.
