= Route 2 (Bolivia) =

National Road in Bolivia

Route 2
- Ruta 2

Major junctions
- East end: Route 1
- Route 41 to Route 3; Route 16
- West end: Puno Highway 130 to Highway 3 at Khasani Border Crossing.

Location
- Country: Bolivia

Highway system
- Highways of Bolivia; National Roads
← Route 1	→ Route 3

Route 2 is a National Road in Bolivia. It connects La Paz to Khasani via Batallas and Copacabana, is paved for its entire length.

== Route description ==
Route 2 has a length of 155 kilometers and runs in mostly west–east direction. Starting in the La Paz suburb of El Alto at Route 1, the road continues out to the Route 41 beltway on the western fringes of the city. Upon reaching the town of Batallas, the road turns north. Roughly 13 km north of the town of Batallas, in the town of Huarina, the road meets Route 16, which continues north towards the Bolivian Amazon and allows through traffic to bypass the cities of Puno and Juliaca in Peru. Route 2 continues west towards Copacabana, where it runs along the edge of the formal townsite. The last 8 kilometers of the road is generally southbound, ending at the Khasani Border Crossing, across the border from the Peruvian city of Yunguyo.

== History ==
This road was included in the Fundamental Road Network by Supreme Decree 25,134 of August 31, 1998.
