= Roboré =

- Town
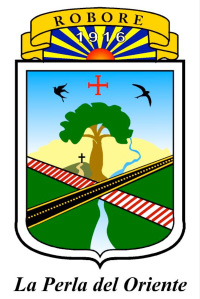
- Flag Seal
- Motto: La Perla del Oriente Boliviano
- Location of San Ignacio in Bolivia
- Coordinates: 18°20′S 59°45′W
- Country: Bolivia
- Department: Santa Cruz Department
- Province: Chiquitos Province
- Municipality: Roboré
- Elevation: 856 ft (261 m)

Population (2012)
  - Total: 10,098
- Time zone: UTC-4 (BOT)
- Website: https://www.municipio.com.bo/municipio-robore.html
- Sources: Google Maps OSM

Roboré is a town in eastern Bolivia. Located in Chiquitos Province, Roboré was founded by Dr. Ángel Sandoval in 1916.

It is home to the Regimiento De Infanteria 15 Junin Roboré of the Bolivian Army.

== Transport ==
Roboré lies on the eastern railway network of Bolivia.

It is served by Roboré Airport.

== Climate ==
Climate data for Roboré, elevation 277 m (909 ft)
Month	Jan	Feb	Mar	Apr	May	Jun	Jul	Aug	Sep	Oct	Nov	Dec	Year
Mean daily maximum °C (°F)	33.2 (91.8)	32.8 (91.0)	32.4 (90.3)	31.1 (88.0)	28.5 (83.3)	27.7 (81.9)	28.6 (83.5)	31.2 (88.2)	32.6 (90.7)	34.0 (93.2)	33.4 (92.1)	33.3 (91.9)	31.6 (88.8)
Daily mean °C (°F)	27.5 (81.5)	27.1 (80.8)	26.6 (79.9)	25.0 (77.0)	22.5 (72.5)	21.5 (70.7)	21.4 (70.5)	23.6 (74.5)	25.4 (77.7)	27.4 (81.3)	27.2 (81.0)	27.6 (81.7)	25.2 (77.4)
Mean daily minimum °C (°F)	22.0 (71.6)	21.5 (70.7)	20.7 (69.3)	18.8 (65.8)	16.4 (61.5)	15.3 (59.5)	14.3 (57.7)	15.9 (60.6)	18.2 (64.8)	20.7 (69.3)	21.0 (69.8)	21.9 (71.4)	18.9 (66.0)
Average precipitation mm (inches)	159.5 (6.28)	135.2 (5.32)	136.9 (5.39)	91.1 (3.59)	72.7 (2.86)	46.9 (1.85)	24.3 (0.96)	29.4 (1.16)	49.3 (1.94)	98.7 (3.89)	132.7 (5.22)	150.7 (5.93)	1,127.4 (44.39)
Average precipitation days	10.4	10.1	10.3	7.8	7.2	5.8	3.6	3.0	4.3	7.8	8.8	9.9	89
Average relative humidity (%)	73.8	75.7	76.8	77.0	78.0	74.6	66.4	60.4	59.4	63.6	68.7	72.4	70.6
Source: Servicio Nacional de Meteorología e Hidrología de Bolivia

== See also ==
- Railway stations in Bolivia
- Transport in Bolivia
