= Bulo Bulo =

Coordinates: 17.2542°S 64.3642°W

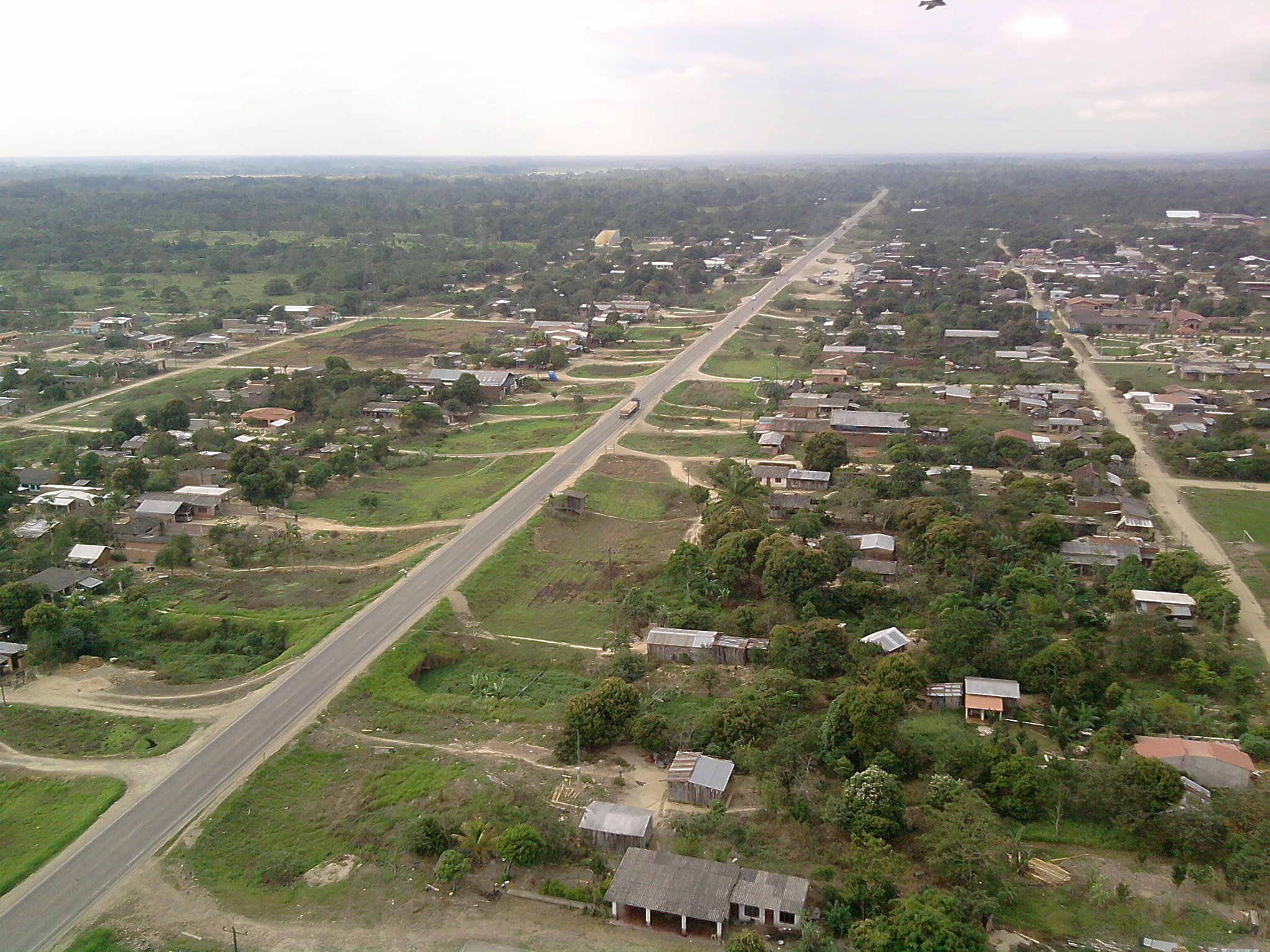
Bulo Bulo

Bulo Bulo is a town in central Bolivia, in Cochabamba Department.

== Transport ==
- It is served by Bulo Bulo Airport.
- In 2013, a railway connection to Montero is proposed.

== See also ==
- List of reduplicated place names
