= Route 6 (Bolivia) =

Highway in Bolivia

Route 6
- Ruta 6

Location
- Country: Bolivia

Highway system
- Highways of Bolivia; National Roads

Route 6 is a National Road in the South American Andean state of Bolivia.

== Route description ==
Route 6 has a length of 976 kilometers and crosses almost the entire width of the country in a southeast–northwest direction. It begins in the Bolivian lowlands on the border to Paraguay and leads along almost the entire eastern Andean chain of the Cordillera Central to the eastern edge of the Altiplano near Oruro. The road crosses the Departments of Santa Cruz, Chuquisaca, Potosí and Oruro, where it ends at Route 1.

The entire route from Oruro to Padilla is or will be paved, the area to Monteagudo is still unpaved gravel or dirt track, from Monteagudo to Boyuibe the road is paved, from Boyuibe to the Paraguayan border it is in turn unpaved.

== History ==
Route 6 is with Decree 25.134 of 21 August 1998 was declared part of the Bolivian trunk road network "Red Vial Fundamental" and at that time only included the 643 km section east of Sucre.
