= Puerto Suárez =

Town in Santa Cruz, Bolivia

- Coordinates: 18°58′00″S 57°47′53″W

Puerto Suárez is an inland river port and municipality in far eastern Bolivia, within Santa Cruz Department. It is located 10 km west of the border with Brazil.

== Location ==
Puerto Suárez is located in the province of Germán Busch, Santa Cruz Department and situated by Laguna Cáceres which is connected to the important Río Paraguay and Río Paraná waterway by the Tamengo Canal. It is also home to Bolivian Navy flotilla. As the easternmost town in Bolivia, Puerto Suárez is the only town in the country which is closer to Brasília than La Paz.

== Transport ==
The municipality is connected to the city of Santa Cruz in the west and Brazil in the east by major roads and rail-links as well as by an airport.

In 2013, a railway connection to the Peruvian port of Ilo was proposed.

Puerto Suarez International Airport has some commercial airline service.

== Population ==
The town was founded on November 10, 1875, by Miguel Suárez Arana. The population was 11,564 (2001 census) and has increased to 12,546 (2007 estimate), some sources even say 20–22,000.

== Climate ==
Climate data for Puerto Suárez, elevation 234 m (768 ft)
| Month | Jan | Feb | Mar | Apr | May | Jun | Jul | Aug | Sep | Oct | Nov | Dec | Year |
|---|---|---|---|---|---|---|---|---|---|---|---|---|---|
| Record high °C (°F) | 39.0 (102.2) | 39.3 (102.7) | 38.0 (100.4) | 43.0 (109.4) | 36.3 (97.3) | 39.4 (102.9) | 37.4 (99.3) | 40.7 (105.3) | 43.1 (109.6) | 43.3 (109.9) | 40.6 (105.1) | 40.0 (104.0) | 43.3 (109.9) |
| Mean daily maximum °C (°F) | 33.0 (91.4) | 32.6 (90.7) | 32.5 (90.5) | 31.2 (88.2) | 28.2 (82.8) | 27.0 (80.6) | 27.2 (81.0) | 29.5 (85.1) | 31.3 (88.3) | 33.3 (91.9) | 33.2 (91.8) | 33.2 (91.8) | 31.0 (87.8) |
| Daily mean °C (°F) | 28.0 (82.4) | 27.6 (81.7) | 27.4 (81.3) | 26.0 (78.8) | 23.3 (73.9) | 22.0 (71.6) | 21.5 (70.7) | 23.3 (73.9) | 25.3 (77.5) | 27.5 (81.5) | 27.7 (81.9) | 28.1 (82.6) | 25.6 (78.2) |
| Mean daily minimum °C (°F) | 22.9 (73.2) | 22.6 (72.7) | 22.2 (72.0) | 20.6 (69.1) | 18.2 (64.8) | 16.8 (62.2) | 15.8 (60.4) | 17.1 (62.8) | 19.2 (66.6) | 21.6 (70.9) | 22.2 (72.0) | 22.9 (73.2) | 20.2 (68.3) |
| Record low °C (°F) | 14.0 (57.2) | 9.2 (48.6) | 11.8 (53.2) | 8.2 (46.8) | 3.0 (37.4) | 1.0 (33.8) | 1.0 (33.8) | 2.0 (35.6) | 6.4 (43.5) | 10.0 (50.0) | 11.0 (51.8) | 11.0 (51.8) | 1.0 (33.8) |
| Average precipitation mm (inches) | 170.1 (6.70) | 149.3 (5.88) | 115.3 (4.54) | 72.7 (2.86) | 58.5 (2.30) | 29.0 (1.14) | 24.5 (0.96) | 24.5 (0.96) | 47.1 (1.85) | 87.2 (3.43) | 118.7 (4.67) | 150.9 (5.94) | 1,047.8 (41.23) |
| Average precipitation days | 11.3 | 10.1 | 8.7 | 5.5 | 4.7 | 3.0 | 2.4 | 2.2 | 3.4 | 6.3 | 7.2 | 9.1 | 73.9 |
| Average relative humidity (%) | 76.2 | 77.6 | 78.6 | 76.8 | 77.0 | 76.2 | 68.4 | 64.8 | 64.4 | 67.2 | 70.4 | 74.4 | 72.7 |
Source: Servicio Nacional de Meteorología e Hidrología de Bolivia

== See also ==
- Railway stations in Bolivia
