= Route 3 (Bolivia) =

Highway in Bolivia

Route 3
- Ruta 3

Route information
- Length: 610 km (380 mi)

Location
- Country: Bolivia

Highway system
- Highways of Bolivia; National Roads

Route 3 is a National Road in Bolivia. It connects La Paz to Trinidad via Coroico, Caranavi, Yucumo, and San Ignacio de Moxos, through the departments of La Paz and Beni.

== Route description ==
Route 3 has a length of 610 km kilometers and runs in an east-west direction. It starts in the La Paz suburb of El Alto at a junction with Route 1. Continuing northeast on the Route 1 roadbed, the road runs around a hairpin turn and runs toward Central La Paz. At the La Paz bus terminal, Route 3 turns off of Avenida Ismael Montes onto a one way street pair, and follows a windy road out of the city. About 25 km outside the city, the road intersects with Route 41, the city beltway. After another 20 km, the road meets with Route 25. Continuing on, the road meets the older Yungas Road, the world's deadliest road. It continues on a new, safer but still windy road. Bypassing Cororico, the road meets Route 40, which runs through Cororico and meets Yungas Road, and follows the Cororico River to Caranavi, where it meets Route 26. Leaving on the route of the Cororico River, the road runs over a mountain pass and a bridge over the Rio Beni. Continuing into Beni Department, Route 3 continues to the town of Yucumo, where it meets Route 8, which runs north to the Brazilian border at Acre. The road continues to Route 24, an uncompleted road to connect it with Cochabamba, in the town of San Ignacio de Moxos. The road then runs about 100 km, ending at Route 9 in downtown Trinidad.
