= Yucumo =

Coordinates: 15.1456°S 67.0342°W

- Town
- Interactive map of Yucumo
- Country: Bolivia
- Department: Beni
- Province: José Ballivián

Population (2012)
  - Total: 4,693
- Time zone: UTC-4 (BOT)

Yucumo is a small town located in the José Ballivián Province in the Beni Department in northern Bolivia.

== History ==
Yucumo, according to historical data, was originally a settlement of the T'simane ethnic group, on the banks of the Yucumaj River, a compound word that comes from two phonemes " Yucu " which is the name of a fish that exists in the waters of this river " Maj " which means large deep, with the arrival of emigrants and the passage of time it was Castilianized to the current Yucumo.

it is known that the first camp was built on the banks of the Mitre stream. This stream acquired this name because in 1954 Mr. Abdón Mitre Pozo had a camp built to begin work on opening the first cattle trail to Palos Blancos, having taken three months to complete the opening with a group of 20 men.

== Geography ==
Yucumo is located in the Bolivian part of the Amazon Basin, east of the country's mountain ranges, in a year-round humid climate. The average temperature in the region is 26 °C, and fluctuates only slightly between 23 °C in June and July and just over 27 °C from October to December. Annual precipitation is just under 2000 mm, with a pronounced rainy season from December to March with 200–300 mm monthly precipitation and the lowest monthly precipitation just under 100 mm from July to September.
