= Route 7 (Bolivia) =

Highway in Bolivia

Route 7
- Ruta 7

Route information
- Existed: 1954–present

Location
- Country: Bolivia

Highway system
- Highways of Bolivia; National Roads

Route 7 is a national road in Bolivia. Prior to its opening in 1954 western and eastern Bolivia were poorly connected. It remains the main road connecting Bolivia's montainious west with the tropical lowlands to the east.

== Route description ==
The road has a length of 488 kilometres (303 mi) and connects Bolivia's first and fourth largest, cities Cochabamba and Santa Cruz de la Sierra, in a northwest–southeast direction. It begins in the valley of Cochabamba at about 2,500-metre (8,200 ft) altitude, accompanies the eastern Andes chain of the Cordillera Central and finally ends at about 450-metre (1,480 ft) altitude in Santa Cruz between the river valleys of the Piray River and the Río Grande. On its way, the road only crosses the two departments of Cochabamba and Santa Cruz.

The entire route of Route 7 is paved.

== History ==
The route was inaugurated in September 1954. The inauguration was a major event and was attended by President of Bolivia Victor Paz Estenssoro and the United States politicians Henry F. Holland and Bourke B. Hickenlooper and journalist Drew Pearson.

Route 7 was declared part of the Bolivian national road network "Red Vial Fundamental" by decree 25.134 of 31 August 1998.

The Colomi bus crash took place on Route 7.
