= Bolivia =

Country in South America

Plurinational State of Bolivia
(in official languages)
Aymara	Wuliwya Walja Ayllunakana Marka
Spanish	Estado Plurinacional de Bolivia
Guarani	Tetã Hetate'ýigua Volívia
Quechua	Puliwya Achka Aylluska Mamallaqta
- Flag Coat of arms
- Motto: La unión es la fuerza "Unity is Strength"
- Anthem: Himno Nacional de Bolivia (Spanish) "National Anthem of Bolivia"
- Dual flag: Wiphala

- Location of Bolivia (dark green) in South America (gray)
- Capital: Sucre (Note: Sucre is the constitutional capital and seat of the judicial branch of government, while the executive, legislative, and electoral branches are seated in La Paz.)
- Administrative center: La Paz
- Largest city: Santa Cruz; 17°48′S 63°10′W
- Official languages: Spanish; Quechua; Aymara; Guarani; Other indigenous languages
- Ethnic groups (2024): 37.63% Native; 14.48% Quechua; 14.03% Aymara; 0.91% Guarani; 1.20% Other; 0.22% Black; 62.15% Other
- Religion (2020): 92.8% Christianity; 81.4% Catholic; 11.4% other Christian; 6.5% no religion; 0.7% other
- Demonym: Bolivian
- Government: Unitary presidential republic
  - President: Rodrigo Paz
  - Vice President: Edmand Lara
  - President of the Senate: Diego Ávila
  - President of the Chamber of Deputies: Roberto Castro Salazar
- Legislature: Plurinational Legislative Assembly
  - Upper house: Chamber of Senators
  - Lower house: Chamber of Deputies

Independence from Spain
  - Declared: 6 August 1825
  - Recognized: 21 July 1847
  - Current constitution: 7 February 2009

Area
  - Total: 1,098,581 km^{2} (424,164 sq mi) (27th)
  - Water (%): 1.29

Population
  - 2026 census: ▲12,749,291 (79th)
  - Density: 10.4/km^{2} (26.9/sq mi) (224th)
- GDP (PPP): 2026 estimate
  - Total: ▲$162.373 billion (89th)
  - Per capita: ▼$12,736 (122th)
- GDP (nominal): 2026 estimate
  - Total: ▼$53.843 billion (86th)
  - Per capita: ▼$4,223 (115th)
- Gini (2021): ▼40.9 medium inequality
- HDI (2023): ▲0.733 high (108th)
- Currency: Boliviano (BOB)
- Time zone: UTC−04:00 (BOT)
- Date format: dd/mm/yyyy
- Calling code: +591
- ISO 3166 code: BO
- Internet TLD: .bo

Bolivia, (Note: /bəˈlɪviə/; Spanish: [boˈliβja]; Quechua: Puliwya [pʊlɪwja]; Aymara: Wuliwya [wʊlɪwja]; Guarani: Mborivia [ᵐboˈɾiʋja]) officially the Plurinational State of Bolivia, (Note: Spanish: Estado Plurinacional de Bolivia [esˈtaðo pluɾinasjoˈnal de βoˈliβja] Quechua: Puliwya Achka Aylluska Mamallaqta Aymara: Wuliwya Walja Ayllunakana Marka Guarani: Tetã Hetate'ýigua Volívia) is a landlocked country located in central South America. Its geography primarily consists of an Andean region to the west and tropical lowlands to the east and north. The country has a diverse environment, including the vast Amazonian plain, the Gran Chaco, temperate valleys, the high-altitude Altiplano plateau, snow-capped peaks, and mountains, encompassing a wide range of climates and biomes across its regions and cities. It includes part of the Pantanal, the largest tropical wetland in the world, along its eastern border. Bolivia is bordered by Brazil to the north and east, Paraguay to the southeast, Argentina to the south, Chile to the southwest, and Peru to the west. The seat of government is La Paz, which contains the executive, legislative, and electoral branches of government, while the constitutional capital is Sucre, the seat of the judiciary. While most population and urban centers lie in the Andean region, the largest city and principal industrial center is Santa Cruz de la Sierra, located in the eastern tropical lowlands.

Bolivia is a constitutionally unitary state divided into nine departments. Its geographic Andean-lowland divide is matched by economic and cultural differences such as those associated with the camba and colla demonyms. One-third of the country is within the Andean mountain range. With an area of 1,098,581 square kilometers (424,164 sq mi), Bolivia is the fifth-largest country in South America and, alongside Paraguay, is one of two landlocked countries in the Americas. It is the largest landlocked country in the Southern Hemisphere; it has inland ports accessing the Atlantic Ocean through two river systems: Acre-Purus-Amazon and Paraguay-Paraná. Bolivia had a population of 11.4 million as of the latest census in 2024. It is multiethnic, including Amerindians, Mestizos, and the descendants of Europeans and Africans. Spanish is the official and predominant language, although 36 indigenous languages also have official status, of which the most commonly spoken are Guaraní, Aymara, and Quechua.

Centuries prior to Spanish colonization, the region formed part of the Tiwanaku polity, which collapsed around 1000 AD. The Colla–Inca War of the 1440s marked the beginning of Inca rule in western Bolivia. The eastern and northern lowlands were inhabited by independent non-Andean Amazonian and Guaraní tribes. Spanish conquistadores arriving from Cusco, Peru and Asunción, Paraguay, forcibly took control of the region in the 16th century.

During the subsequent Spanish colonial period, Bolivia was administered by the Real Audiencia of Charcas. Spain built a large part of its global empire upon the massive silver reserves from Cerro Rico in Potosí. Following an unsuccessful rebellion in Sucre on May 25, 1809, sixteen years of fighting would follow before the establishment of the republic, named for Simón Bolívar. Over the course of the 19th and early 20th centuries, Bolivia lost control of several peripheral territories to neighboring countries, such as the Acre territory after Brazil's 1899–1903 takeover, and the Pacific coastal region which Chile seized in 1879.

Bolivia was ruled by an oligarchy composed of land-owning and mining interests, in which the people who were apart of the oligarchy were Simón Iturri Patiño, Moritz Hochschild, and Carlos Víctor Aramayo, until the Bolivian National Revolution of 1952 established universal suffrage, nationalized lucrative tin mining and made a limited land reform. There was a succession of military and civilian governments with the last non-elected military ruler leaving office in 1982.

Modern Bolivia is a member of the Non-Aligned Movement (NAM), Organization of American States (OAS), Amazon Cooperation Treaty Organization (ACTO), Bank of the South, the Union of South American Nations (USAN), and Southern Common Market (Mercosur). Bolivia remains a developing country, the second-poorest in South America, though it has slashed poverty rates. Its main economic resources include agriculture, forestry, fishing, mining, and goods such as textiles and clothing, refined metals, and refined petroleum. Bolivia is very geologically rich, with mines producing tin, lithium, silver, and copper. It is known for its production of coca plants and refined cocaine. In 2021, estimated coca cultivation and cocaine production was reported to be 39,700 hectares and 317 metric tons, respectively.

== Etymology ==
Bolivia is named after Simón Bolívar, a Venezuelan leader in the Spanish American wars of independence. The leader of Venezuela, Antonio José de Sucre, had been given the option by Bolívar to either unify Charcas (present-day Bolivia) with the newly formed Republic of Peru, to unify with the United Provinces of the Río de la Plata, or to formally declare its independence from Spain as a wholly independent state. Sucre opted to create a new state and on 6 August 1825, with local support, named it in honor of Bolívar.

The original name was "Republic of Bolívar". Some days later, Congressman Manuel Martín Cruz proposed: "If from Romulus, Rome, then from Bolívar, Bolivia" (Spanish: Si de Rómulo, Roma; de Bolívar, Bolivia). The name was approved on 3 October 1825. In 2009, a new constitution changed the official name to "Plurinational State of Bolivia" to reflect the multi-ethnic nature of the country and the strengthened rights of Bolivia's indigenous peoples under the new constitution.

== History ==
=== Pre-colonial ===
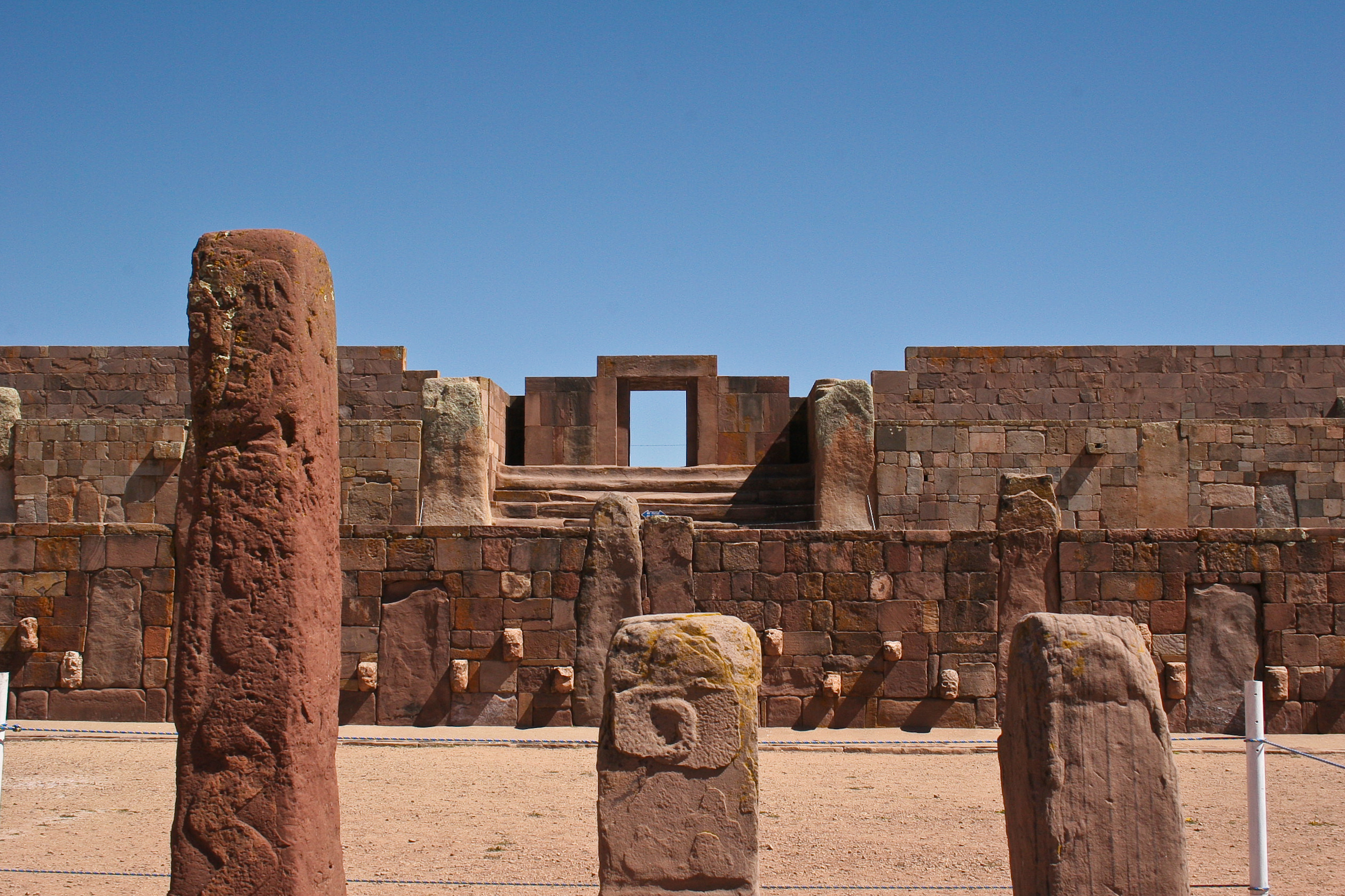
The Kalasasaya Temple of the Tiwanaku Polity (200 BC)

The region had been occupied for over 2,500 years when the Aymara arrived; however, present-day Aymara associate themselves with the ancient civilization of the Tiwanaku polity, which had its capital at Tiwanaku in western Bolivia. Tiwanaku dates back as early as 1500 BC, when it was a small, agriculturally-based village.

The Aymara community grew to urban proportions between AD 600 and 800, becoming an important regional power in the southern Andes from La Paz. According to early estimates, the city covered approximately 6.5 square kilometers (2.5 square miles) at its peak and had between 15,000 and 30,000 inhabitants. However, in 1996, satellite imaging was used to map the extent of preserved suka kollus (flooded raised fields) across the three primary valleys of Tiwanaku, with the results suggesting a population-carrying capacity of anywhere between 285,000 and 1,482,000 people.

Around AD 400, Tiwanaku went from being a locally-dominant force to a 'predatory' state, aggressively expanding its reach into the Yungas and bringing its culture and ways to new peoples in Peru, Bolivia, and Chile. Nonetheless, Tiwanaku was not a violent or domineering culture; to expand its reach, the state exercised great political astuteness, created colonies, fostered local trade agreements (which made other cultures rather dependent), and instituted state cults.

As rainfall gradually decreased, the stores of food supplies decreased, and thus the elites lost power. Tiwanaku disappeared around AD 1000. The area remained uninhabited for centuries thereafter. Between 1438 and 1527, the Inca Empire expanded from its capital at Cusco, gaining control over much of northern Andes and extending its control into the fringes of the Amazon basin.

=== Colonial period ===
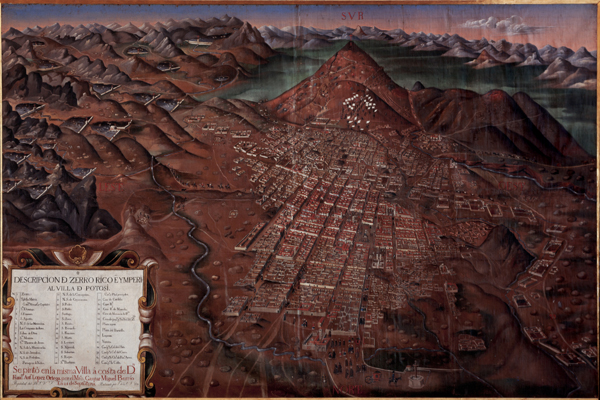
The Villa Imperial de Potosí, established in 1545, held great significance for the Spanish colonial empire, as its abundant mineral wealth accounted for over half of the global silver production during the colonial period.

The Spanish conquest of the Inca Empire began in 1524 and was mostly completed by 1533. The territory now called Bolivia was known as Charcas, and was under the authority of Spain. Local government came from the Audiencia de Charcas located in Chuquisaca (La Plata—modern Sucre). Founded in 1545 as a mining town, Potosí produced fabulous wealth, becoming the largest city in the New World with a population exceeding 150,000 people.

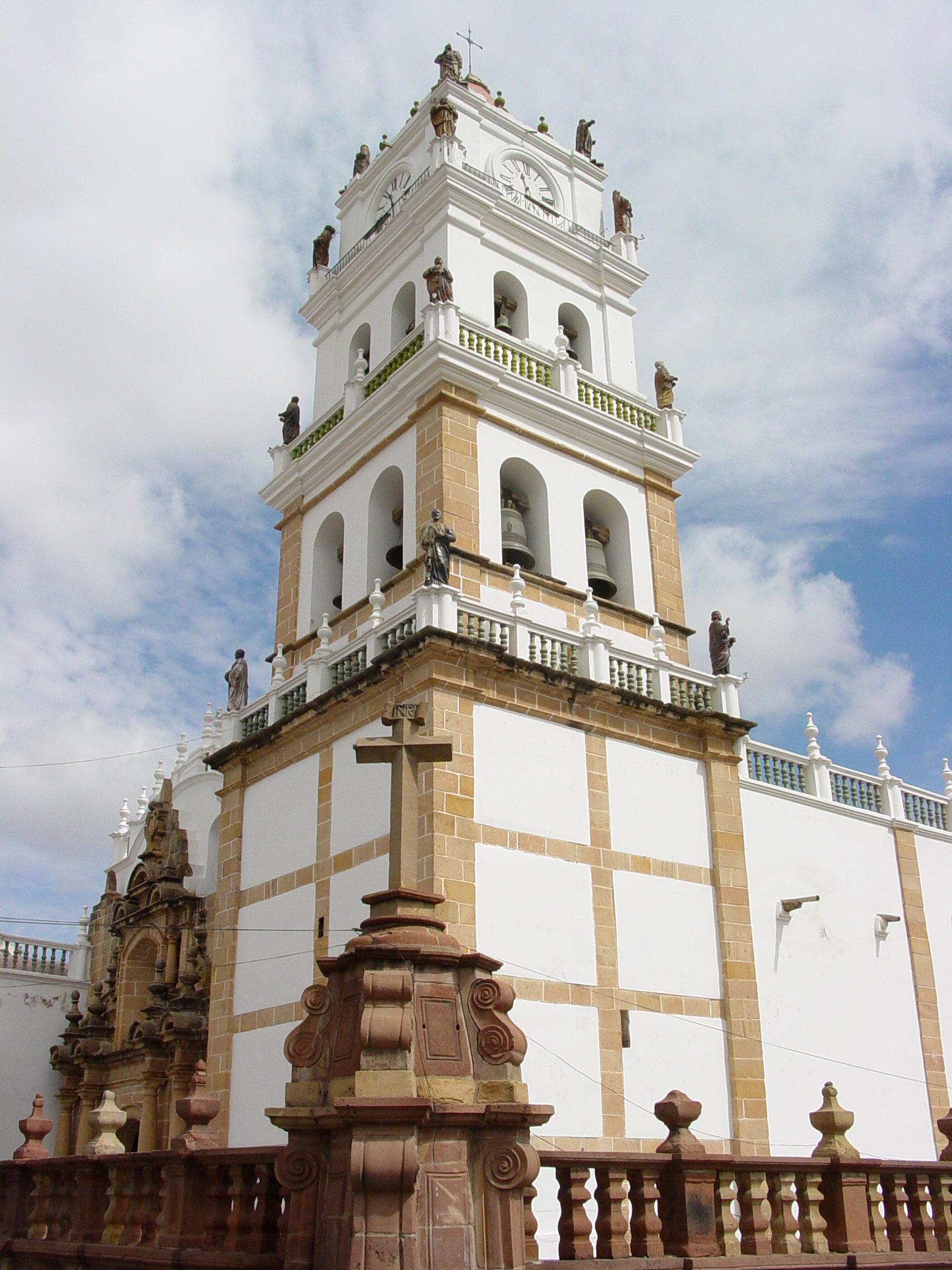
Metropolitan Cathedral of Sucre in Sucre, a UNESCO World Heritage city

By the late 16th century, silver from the region was an important source of revenue for the Spanish Empire. A steady stream of natives served as labor force under the brutal, slave conditions of the Spanish version of the pre-Columbian draft system called the mita. Charcas was transferred to the Viceroyalty of the Río de la Plata in 1776, and the people from its capital at Buenos Aires coined the term "Upper Peru" (Spanish: Alto Peru) as a popular reference to the Royal Audiencia of Charcas. Túpac Katari led the indigenous rebellion that laid siege to La Paz in March 1781, during which 20,000 people died. As Spanish royal authority weakened during the Napoleonic Wars, sentiment against colonial rule grew.

=== Independence and subsequent wars ===
The struggle for independence started in Chuquisaca (present-day Sucre) on 25 May 1809, known as the first cry of freedom in Latin America, which was followed by the La Paz revolution on 16 July 1809. The La Paz revolution marked a complete split with the Spanish government, while the Chuquisaca Revolution established a local independent junta in the name of the Spanish king deposed by Napoleon Bonaparte. Both revolutions were short-lived and defeated by the Spanish authorities in the Viceroyalty of the Rio de La Plata, but the following year the Spanish American wars of independence raged across the continent.

Bolivia was captured and recaptured many times during the war by the royalists and patriots. Buenos Aires sent three military campaigns, all of which were defeated, and eventually limited itself to protecting the national borders at Salta. Bolivia was finally freed of royalist dominion by Marshal Antonio José de Sucre, with a military campaign coming from the north in support of the campaign of Simón Bolívar. After 16 years of war the republic was declared independent on 6 August 1825.

The first coat of arms of Bolivia, formerly named the Republic of Bolívar in honor of Simón Bolívar

In 1836 under the rule of Marshal Andrés de Santa Cruz, Bolivia invaded Peru to reinstall the deposed president, General Luis José de Orbegoso. The Peru–Bolivian Confederation was formed with de Santa Cruz as the Supreme Protector. Chile and Argentina successively declared war, setting off the War of the Confederation. The Chilean army and its Peruvian rebel allies surrendered unconditionally and signed the Paucarpata Treaty, which stipulated that Chile would withdraw from Peru–Bolivia, Chile would return captured confederate ships, economic relations would be normalized, and the confederation would pay Peruvian debt to Chile. However, the Chilean government and public rejected the peace treaty. Chile organized a second attack on the confederation and defeated it in the Battle of Yungay. After this defeat, Santa Cruz resigned and went to exile in Ecuador and then Paris, and the confederation was dissolved.

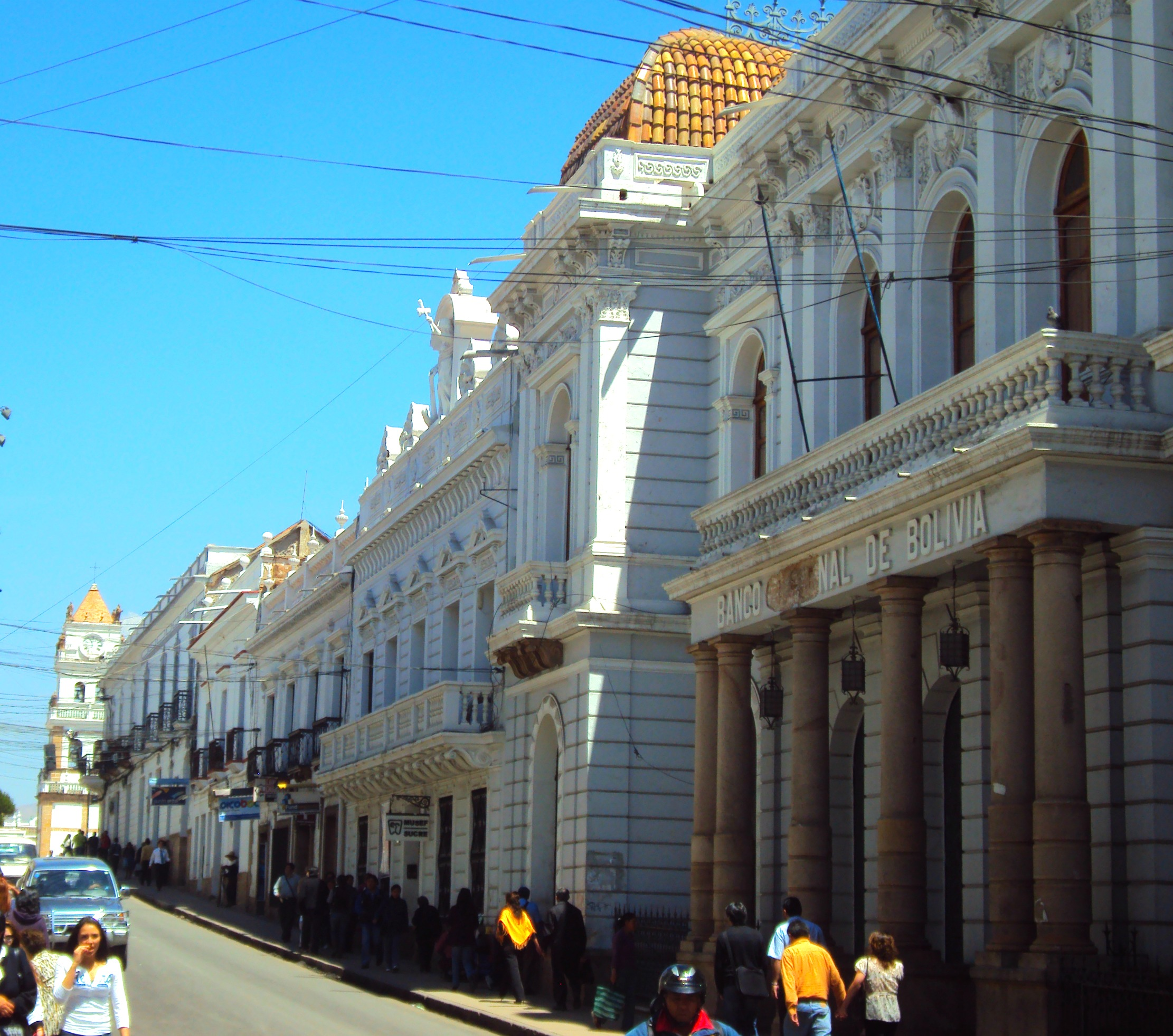
Historic headquarters of Banco Nacional de Bolivia in Sucre

Following the renewed independence of Peru, President Agustín Gamarra invaded Boliviain the Peruvian–Bolivian War. On 18 November 1841, the Bolivian Army defeated the Peruvian troops, and Gamarra was killed in battle. After the victory, Bolivia invaded Peru on several fronts. The eviction of the Bolivian troops from the south of Peru would be achieved by the greater availability of material and human resources of Peru; the Bolivian army did not have enough troops to maintain an occupation. In the district of Locumba–Tacna, a column of Peruvian soldiers and peasants defeated a Bolivian regiment in the Battle of Los Altos de Chipe (Locumba). In the district of Sama and in Arica, the Peruvian colonel José María Lavayén organized a troop that managed to defeat the Bolivian forces of Colonel Rodríguez Magariños and threaten the port of Arica. In the battle of Tarapacá on 7 January 1842, Peruvian militias formed by the commander Juan Buendía defeated a detachment led by Bolivian colonel José María García, who died in the confrontation. Bolivian troops left Tacna, Arica and Tarapacá in February 1842, retreating towards Moquegua and Puno. The battles of Motoni and Orurillo forced the withdrawal of Bolivian forces occupying Peruvian territory and exposed Bolivia to the threat of counter-invasion. The Treaty of Puno was signed on 7 June 1842, ending the war. However, the climate of tension between Lima and La Paz would continue until 1847, when the signing of a Peace and Trade Treaty became effective.

A period of political and economic instability in the early-to-mid-19th century weakened Bolivia. In addition, during the War of the Pacific (1879–84), Chile occupied vast territories rich in natural resources southwest of Bolivia, including the Bolivian coast. Chile took control of today's Chuquicamata area, the adjoining rich salitre (saltpeter) fields, and the port of Antofagasta among other Bolivian territories.

Since independence, Bolivia has lost over half of its territory to neighboring countries. Through diplomatic channels in 1909, it lost the basin of the Madre de Dios River and the territory of the Purus River in the Amazon, yielding 250,000 km^{2} to Peru. It also lost the state of Acre in the Acre War, important because the region was known for its production of rubber. Peasants and the Bolivian army fought briefly, but after a few victories and facing the prospect of a total war against Brazil, it was forced to sign the Treaty of Petrópolis in 1903, in which Bolivia lost the territory. Popular myth has it that President Mariano Melgarejo traded the land for what he called "a magnificent white horse," and Acre was subsequently flooded with Brazilians, which ultimately led to confrontation and fear of war with Brazil.

=== Early 20th century ===
Bolivia's territorial losses (1867–1938)

In the late 19th century, an increase in the world price of silver brought Bolivia relative prosperity and political stability. During the early 20th century, tin replaced silver as the country's most important source of wealth. A succession of governments controlled by the economic and social elite followed laissez-faire capitalist policies through the first 30 years of the 20th century.

Living conditions of the native people, who constitute most of the population, remained deplorable. With work opportunities limited to primitive conditions in the mines and in large estates having nearly feudal status, they had no access to education, economic opportunity, and political participation. Bolivia's defeat by Paraguay in the Chaco War (1932–1935), where Bolivia lost a great part of the Gran Chaco region in dispute, marked a turning point.

The Revolutionary Nationalist Movement (MNR) emerged as a broad-based party. Denied its victory in the 1951 presidential elections, the MNR led a successful revolution in 1952. Under President Víctor Paz Estenssoro, the MNR, having strong popular pressure, introduced universal suffrage into his political platform and carried out a sweeping land-reform promoting rural education and nationalization of the largest tin mines.

=== Late 20th century ===
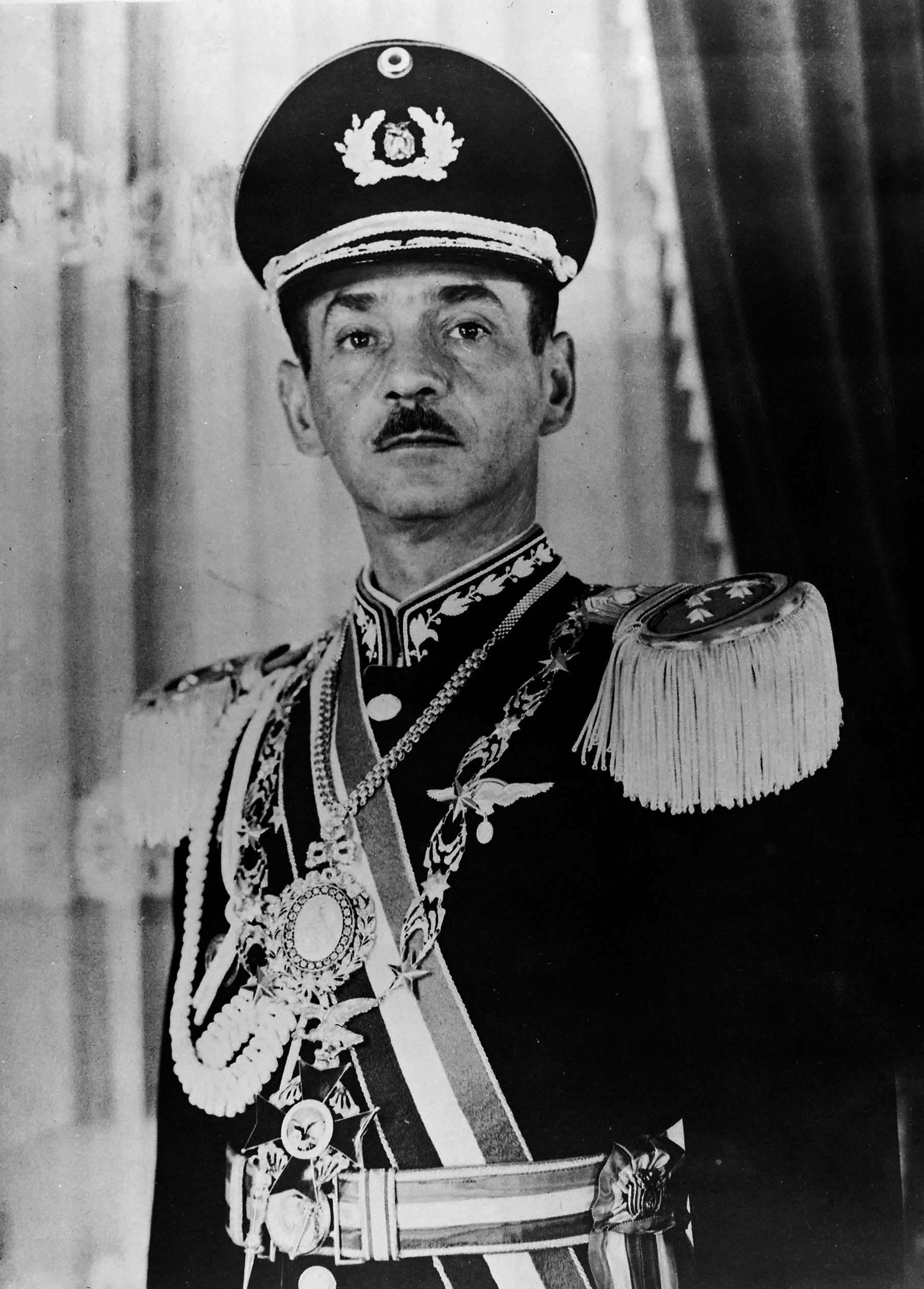
In 1971, Hugo Banzer Suárez, supported by the CIA, forcibly ousted President Torres in a coup.

Twelve years of tumultuous rule left the MNR divided. In 1964, a military junta overthrew Paz Estenssoro at the outset of his third term. The 1969 death of President René Barrientos, a former member of the junta who was elected president in 1966, led to a succession of weak governments. Alarmed by the rising Popular Assembly and the increase in the popularity of President Juan José Torres, the military, the MNR, and others installed Hugo Banzer as president in 1971. He returned to the presidency in 1997 through 2001. Torres, who had fled Bolivia, was kidnapped and assassinated in 1976 as part of Operation Condor, the U.S.-supported campaign of political repression by South American right-wing dictators.

The United States' Central Intelligence Agency (CIA) financed and trained the Bolivian military dictatorship in the 1960s. The revolutionary leader Che Guevara was killed by a team of CIA officers and members of the Bolivian Army on 9 October 1967, in Bolivia. Félix Rodríguez was a CIA officer on the team with the Bolivian army that captured and shot Guevara. Rodriguez said that after he received a Bolivian presidential execution order, he told "the soldier who pulled the trigger to aim carefully, to remain consistent with the Bolivian government's story that Che had been killed in action during a clash with the Bolivian army." Rodriguez said the US government had wanted Che in Panama, and "I could have tried to falsify the command to the troops, and got Che to Panama as the US government said they had wanted", but that he had chosen to "let history run its course" as desired by Bolivia.

Elections in 1978 were marked by fraud, and those in 1979 were inconclusive. There were coups d'état, counter-coups, and caretaker governments. Following the 1980 election, General Luis García Meza carried out a coup d'état. The Bolivian Workers' Center, which tried to resist the putsch, was violently repressed. More than a thousand people were killed in less than a year. Cousin of one of the country's most important narco-traffickers, García Meza favored the production of cocaine. After a military rebellion forced out García Meza in 1981, three other military governments in 14 months struggled with Bolivia's growing economic problems. Unrest forced the military to convoke the Congress elected in 1980 and allow it to choose a new president. In October 1982, Hernán Siles Zuazo again became president, 22 years after the end of his first term of office (1956–1960).

=== Democratic transition ===
In 1993, Gonzalo Sánchez de Lozada was elected president in alliance with the Túpac Katari Revolutionary Liberation Movement, which inspired indigenous-sensitive and multicultural-aware policies. Sánchez de Lozada pursued an aggressive economic and social reform agenda. The most dramatic reform was privatization under the "capitalization" program, under which investors, typically foreign, acquired 50% ownership and management control of public enterprises in return for agreed upon capital investments. In 1993, Sanchez de Lozada introduced the Plan de Todos, which led to the decentralization of government, introduction of intercultural bilingual education, implementation of agrarian legislation, and privatization of state owned businesses. The plan explicitly states that Bolivian citizens would own a minimum of 51% of enterprises; under the plan, most state-owned enterprises, though not mines, were sold. This privatization led to a neoliberal structuring.

The reforms and economic restructuring were strongly opposed by certain segments of society, which instigated frequent and sometimes violent protests, particularly in La Paz and the Chapare coca-growing region, from 1994 through 1996. The indigenous population of the Andean region was not able to benefit from government reforms. During this time, the umbrella labor organization of Bolivia, the Central Obrera Boliviana (COB), became increasingly unable to effectively challenge government policy. A teachers' strike in 1995 was defeated because the COB could not marshal the support of many of its members, including construction and factory workers.

==== Banzer presidency (1997–2002) ====
In the 1997 elections, General Hugo Banzer, leader of the Nationalist Democratic Action party (ADN) and former dictator (1971–1978), won 22% of the vote, while the MNR candidate won 18%. At the outset of his government, Banzer launched a policy of using special police-units to eradicate physically the illegal coca of the Chapare region. The Revolutionary Left Movement (MIR) of Jaime Paz Zamora remained a coalition partner throughout the Banzer government, supporting this policy (called the Dignity Plan). The Banzer government continued the free-market and privatization-policies of its predecessor. The relatively robust economic growth of the mid-1990s continued until about the third year of its term in office. After that, regional, global and domestic factors contributed to a decline in economic growth. Financial crises in Argentina and Brazil, lower world prices for export commodities, and reduced employment in the coca sector depressed the Bolivian economy. The public also perceived a significant amount of public sector corruption. These factors contributed to increasing social protests during the second half of Banzer's term.

Between January 1999 and April 2000, large-scale protests erupted in Cochabamba in response to the privatization of water resources by foreign companies and a subsequent doubling of water prices. On 6 August 2001, Banzer resigned from office after being diagnosed with cancer. He died less than a year later. Vice President Jorge Fernando Quiroga Ramírez completed the final year of his term.

==== Sánchez de Lozada and Mesa presidencies (2002–2005) ====
In the June 2002 national elections, former President Gonzalo Sánchez de Lozada (MNR) placed first with 22.5% of the vote, followed by coca advocate and native peasant leader Evo Morales (Movement Toward Socialism, MAS) with 20.9%. A July agreement between the MNR and the fourth-place MIR, which had again been led in the election by Paz Zamora, virtually ensured the election of Sánchez de Lozada in the congressional run-off, and on 6 August he was sworn in for the second time. The MNR platform featured three overarching objectives: economic reactivation (and job creation), anti-corruption, and social inclusion.

In 2003, the Bolivian gas conflict broke out. On 12 October 2003, the government imposed martial law in El Alto after 16 people were shot by the police and several dozen wounded in violent clashes. Faced with the option of resigning or more bloodshed, Sánchez de Lozada offered his resignation in a letter to an emergency session of Congress. After his resignation was accepted and his vice president, Carlos Mesa, became president, he fled to the United States.

The country's internal situation became unfavorable for such political action on the international stage. After a resurgence of gas protests in 2005, Mesa attempted to resign in January 2005, but his offer was refused by Congress. On 22 March 2005, after weeks of street protests from organizations accusing Mesa of bowing to U.S. corporate interests, Mesa again offered his resignation to Congress, which was accepted on 10 June. The chief justice of the Supreme Court, Eduardo Rodríguez, was sworn as interim president.

==== Morales presidency (2005–2019) ====
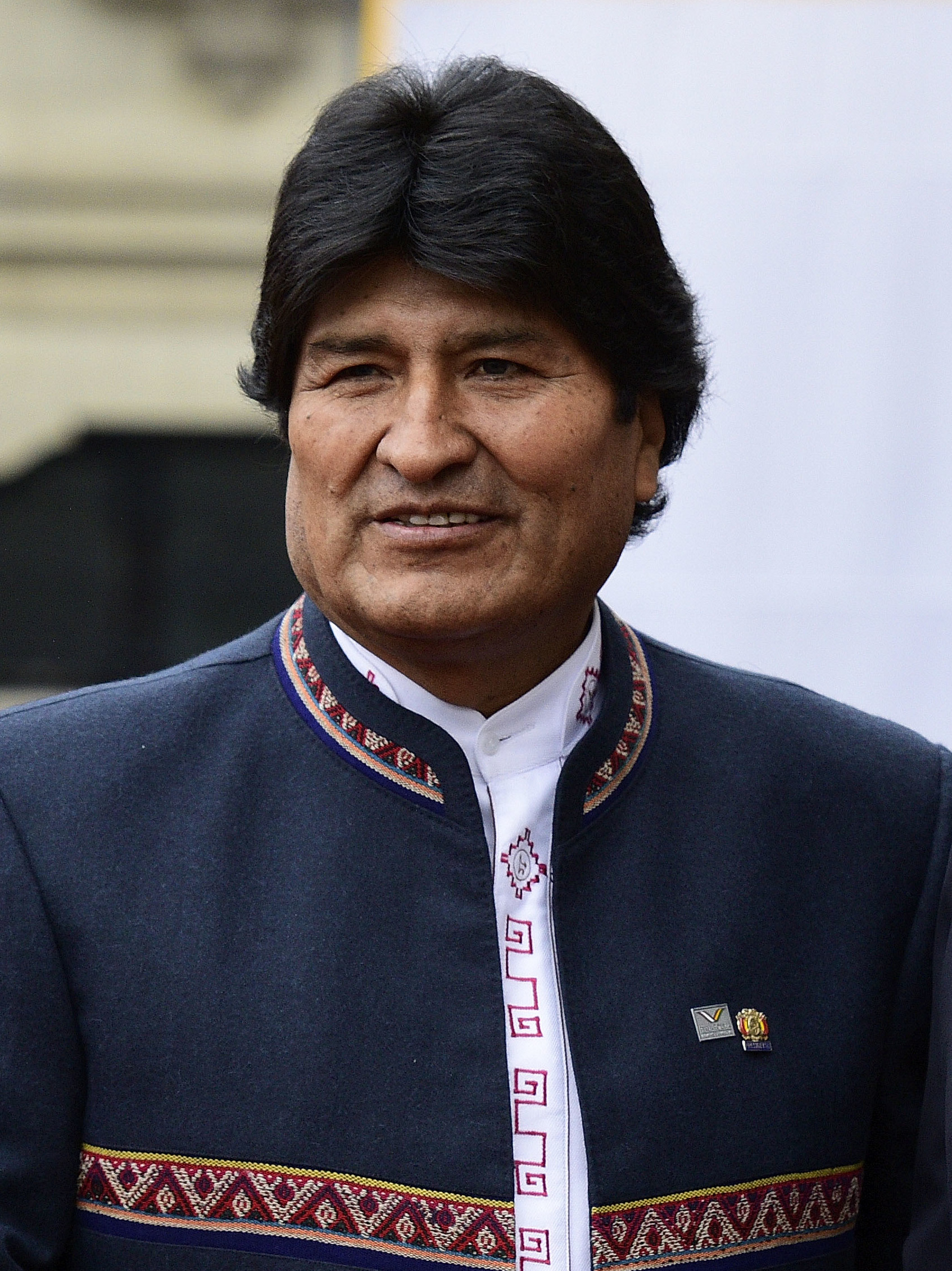
Former President, Evo Morales

Evo Morales won the 2005 presidential election with 53.7% of the votes. On 1 May 2006, Morales announced his intent to re-nationalize Bolivian hydrocarbon assets following protests which demanded this action. Fulfilling a campaign promise, on 6 August 2006, Morales opened the Bolivian Constituent Assembly to begin writing a new constitution aimed at giving more power to the indigenous majority.

2009 marked the creation of a new constitution and the renaming of the country to the Plurinational State of Bolivia. The previous constitution did not allow a consecutive reelection of a president, but the new constitution allowed for one reelection, starting the dispute if Morales was enabled to run for a second term arguing he was elected under the last constitution. This triggered a new general election in which Morales was re-elected with 61.36% of the vote. His MAS party won a two-thirds majority in both houses of the National Congress. By 2013, after being reelected under the new constitution, Morales and his party attempted a third term. The opposition argued that a third term would be unconstitutional, but the Bolivian Constitutional Court ruled that Morales' first term under the previous constitution did not count towards his term limit. This allowed Morales to run for a third term in 2014, and he was re-elected with 64.22% of the vote. Morales began to plan for a fourth term, and the 2016 Bolivian constitutional referendum asked voters to override the constitution and allow Morales to run for an additional term in office. Morales narrowly lost the referendum; however, in 2017 his party then petitioned the Bolivian Constitutional Court to override the constitution on the basis that the American Convention on Human Rights made term limits a human rights violation. The Inter-American Court of Human Rights determined that term limits are not a human rights violation; however, once again the Bolivian Constitutional Court ruled that Morales has permission to run for a fourth term in the 2019 elections, and this permission was not retracted. "[T]he country's highest court overruled the constitution, scrapping term limits altogether for every office. Morales can now run for a fourth term in 2019 – and for every election thereafter."

The revenues generated by the partial nationalization of hydrocarbons made it possible to finance several social measures: the Renta Dignidad (or old age minimum) for people over 60 years old; the Juana Azurduy voucher (named after the 19th century revolutionary Juana Azurduy de Padilla), which ensures the complete coverage of medical expenses for pregnant women and their children in order to fight infant mortality; the Juancito Pinto voucher (named after a child hero of the Pacific War), an aid paid until the end of secondary school to parents whose children are in school in order to combat school dropout, and the Single Health System, which since 2018 has offered all Bolivians free medical care.

The reforms adopted made the Bolivian economic system the most successful and stable in the region. Between 2006 and 2019, GDP grew from $9 billion to over $40 billion, real wages increased, GDP per capita tripled, foreign exchange reserves rose, inflation was essentially eliminated, and extreme poverty fell from 38% to 15%, a 23-point drop.

==== Áñez presidency (2019–2020) ====
During the 2019 general election, the Transmisión de Resultados Electorales Preliminares (a quick count process used in Latin America as a transparency measure in electoral processes) was interrupted; at the time, Morales had a lead of 46.86 percent to Mesa's 36.72, after 95.63 percent of tally sheets were counted. Two days after the interruption, the official count showed Morales fractionally clearing the 10-point margin he needed to avoid a runoff election, with the final official tally counted as 47.08 percent to Mesa's 36.51 percent, starting a wave of protests and tension in the country.

Amidst allegations of fraud perpetrated by the Morales government, widespread widespread protests were organized to dispute the election. On 10 November, the Organization of American States (OAS) released a preliminary report concluding several irregularities in the election, though these findings were heavily disputed. The New York Times reported on 7 June 2020 that the OAS analysis immediately after the 20 October election was flawed yet fuelled "a chain of events that changed the South American nation's history".

2020 Bolivian general election, results by department

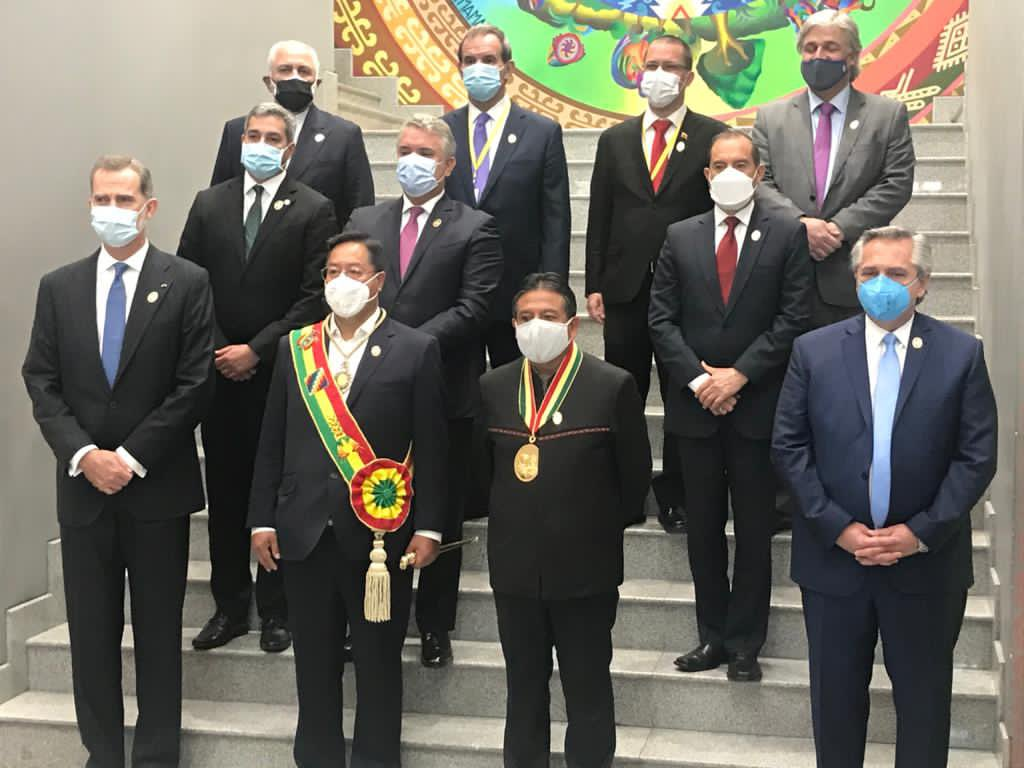
Inauguration of Luis Arce and David Choquehuanca on 8 November 2020

After weeks of protests, Morales resigned on national television shortly after the Commander-in-Chief of the armed forces General Williams Kaliman had urged that he do so to restore "peace and stability". Opposition Senator Jeanine Áñez declared herself interim president, claiming constitutional succession after the president, vice president and both head of the legislature chambers. She was confirmed as interim president by the constitutional court who declared her succession to be constitutional and automatic. International politicians, scholars and journalists were divided between describing the event as a coup or a spontaneous social uprising against an unconstitutional fourth term. Protests to reinstate Morales as president continued becoming highly violent: burning public buses and private houses, destroying public infrastructure and harming pedestrians. The protests were met with more violence by security forces against Morales supporters after Áñez exempted police and military from criminal responsibility in operations for "the restoration of order and public stability".

In April 2020, the interim government took out a loan of more than $327 million from the International Monetary Fund to meet the country's needs during the COVID-19 pandemic. New elections were scheduled for 3 May 2020. In response to the coronavirus pandemic, the electoral body made an announcement postponing the election. MAS reluctantly agreed with the first delay only. A date for the new election was delayed twice more, in the face of massive protests and violence. The final proposed date for the elections was 18 October 2020. Observers from the OAS, UNIORE, and the UN all reported that they found no fraudulent actions in the 2020 elections.

The 2020 general election had a record voter turnout of 88.4% and ended in a landslide win for MAS which took 55.1% of the votes compared to 28.8% for centrist former president Carlos Mesa. Both Mesa and Áñez conceded defeat.

==== Arce presidency (2020–2025) ====
On 8 November 2020, Luis Arce was sworn in as president alongside Vice President David Choquehuanca. In February 2021, the Arce government returned an amount of around $351 million to the IMF. This comprised a loan of $327 million taken out by the interim government in April 2020 and interest of around $24 million. The government said it returned the loan to protect Bolivia's economic sovereignty and because the conditions attached to the loan were unacceptable.

On 26 June 2024, a military coup attempt led by Juan José Zúñiga ended after lasting only 5 hours. In the evening of 26 June, Bolivian police arrested Zúñiga.

==== Paz presidency (2025–present) ====
Rodrigo Paz of the centre-right Christian Democratic Party (PDC) won the 2025 run-off election against right-wing former President Jorge Quiroga, meaning the end of governance by the MAS party and a clear political shift to the right. On 8 November 2025, Rodrigo Paz was sworn in as Bolivia's new president during Bolivia's worst economic crisis in 40 years.

Bolivian relations with the United States improved significantly under president Rodrigo Paz. In 2026, Bolivia joined the "Shield of the Americas", the US-led security initiative in the Western Hemisphere.

== Geography ==
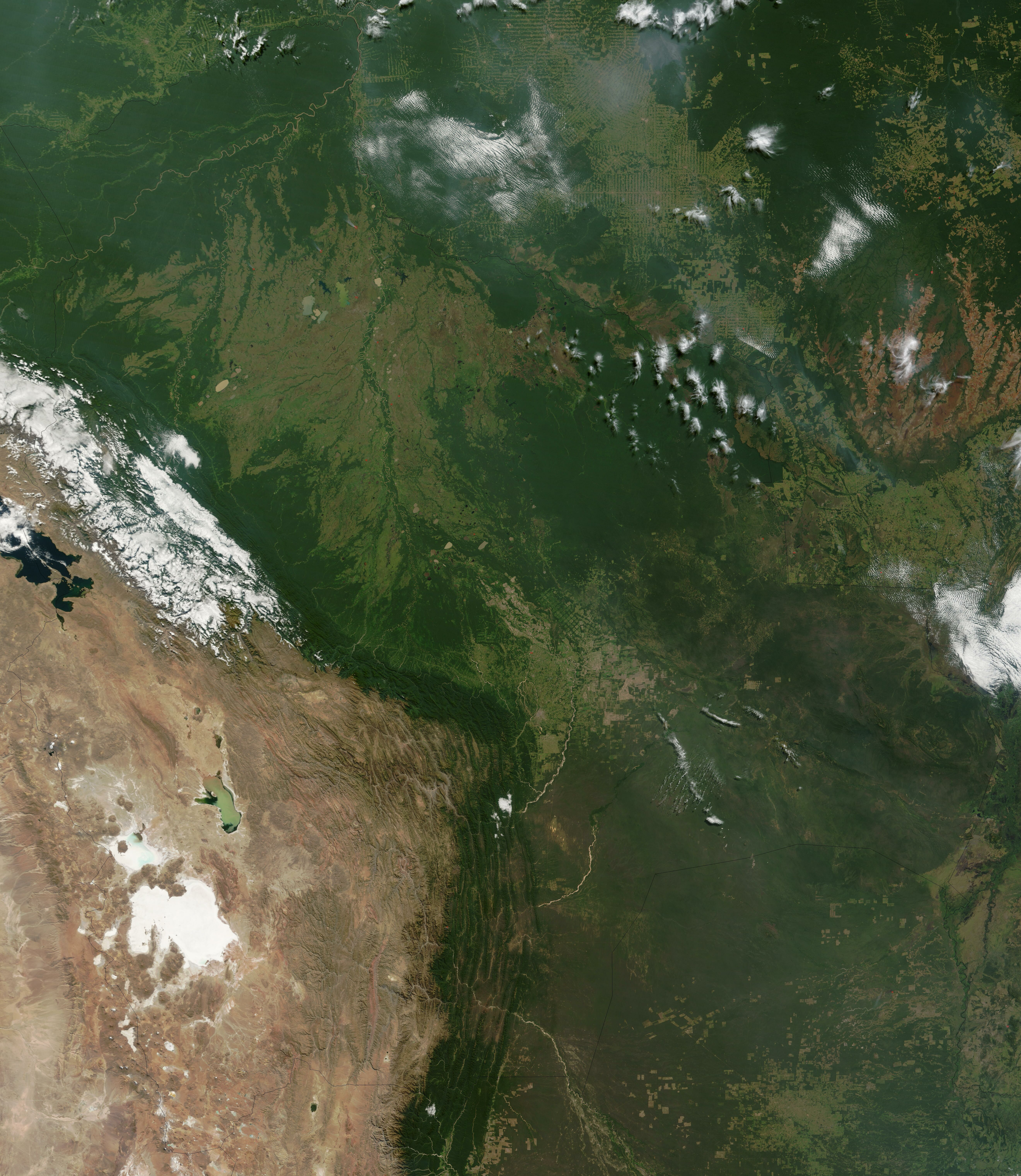
Satellite image of Bolivia: The western region is defined by the Andes Mountains and the Altiplano plateau, whereas the eastern region is characterized by the extensive lowland plains of the Amazon Basin.

Bolivia is located in central South America, between 57°26'–69°38'W and 9°38'–22°53'S. With an area of 1,098,581 square kilometers (424,164 sq mi), Bolivia is the world's 28th-largest country and the fifth largest country in South America, extending from the Central Andes through part of the Gran Chaco, Pantanal and as far as the Amazon rainforest. The geographic center is the Puerto Estrella ("Star Port") on the Río Grande, in Ñuflo de Chávez Province, Santa Cruz Department.

The geography exhibits a great variety of terrain and climates. Bolivia has a high level of biodiversity, considered one of the greatest in the world, as well as several ecoregions with ecological sub-units such as the Altiplano, tropical rainforests (including Amazon rainforest), dry valleys, and the Chiquitania, which is a tropical savanna. These areas feature enormous variations in altitude, from an elevation of 6,542 meters (21,463 ft) above sea level in Nevado Sajama to nearly 70 meters (230 ft) along the Paraguay River.

Bolivia had a 2018 Forest Landscape Integrity Index mean score of 8.47/10, ranking it 21st globally out of 172 countries. Forest cover is around 47% of the total land area, equivalent to 50,833,760 ha of forest in 2020, down from 57,804,720 ha in 1990. In 2020, naturally regenerating forest covered 50,771,160 ha, and planted forest covered 62,600 ha. Of the naturally regenerating forest 0% was reported to be primary forest (consisting of native tree species with no clearly visible indications of human activity) and around 24% of the forest area was found within protected areas. For 2015, 100% of the forest area was reported to be under public ownership.

Bolivia can be divided into three physiographic regions:

- The Andean region in the southwest spans 28% of the national territory, extending over 307,603 square kilometers (118,766 sq mi). This area is located above 3,000 meters (9,800 ft) altitude and is located between two big Andean chains, the Cordillera Occidental ("Western Range") and the Cordillera Central ("Central Range"), with some of the highest spots in the Americas such as the Nevado Sajama with an altitude of 6,542 meters (21,463 ft) and the Illimani at 6,462 meters (21,201 ft). Cordillera Central contains Lake Titicaca—the highest commercially navigable lake in the world and the largest lake in South America— and the Salar de Uyuni, the largest salt flat in the world and an important source of lithium.
- The Sub-Andean region in the center and south is an intermediate region between the Altiplano and the eastern llanos (plain); this region comprises 13% of the territory, extending over 142,815 km^{2} (55,141 sq mi) and encompassing the valleys and the Yungas region. It is distinguished by its farming activities and its temperate climate.
- The Llanos region in the northeast comprises 59% of the territory, with 648,163 km^{2} (250,257 sq mi). It is located to the north of the Cordillera Central and extends from the Andean foothills to the Paraguay River. It is a region of flat land and small plateaus, all covered by extensive rain forests containing enormous biodiversity. The region is less than 400 meters (1,300 ft) above sea level.

=== Geology ===
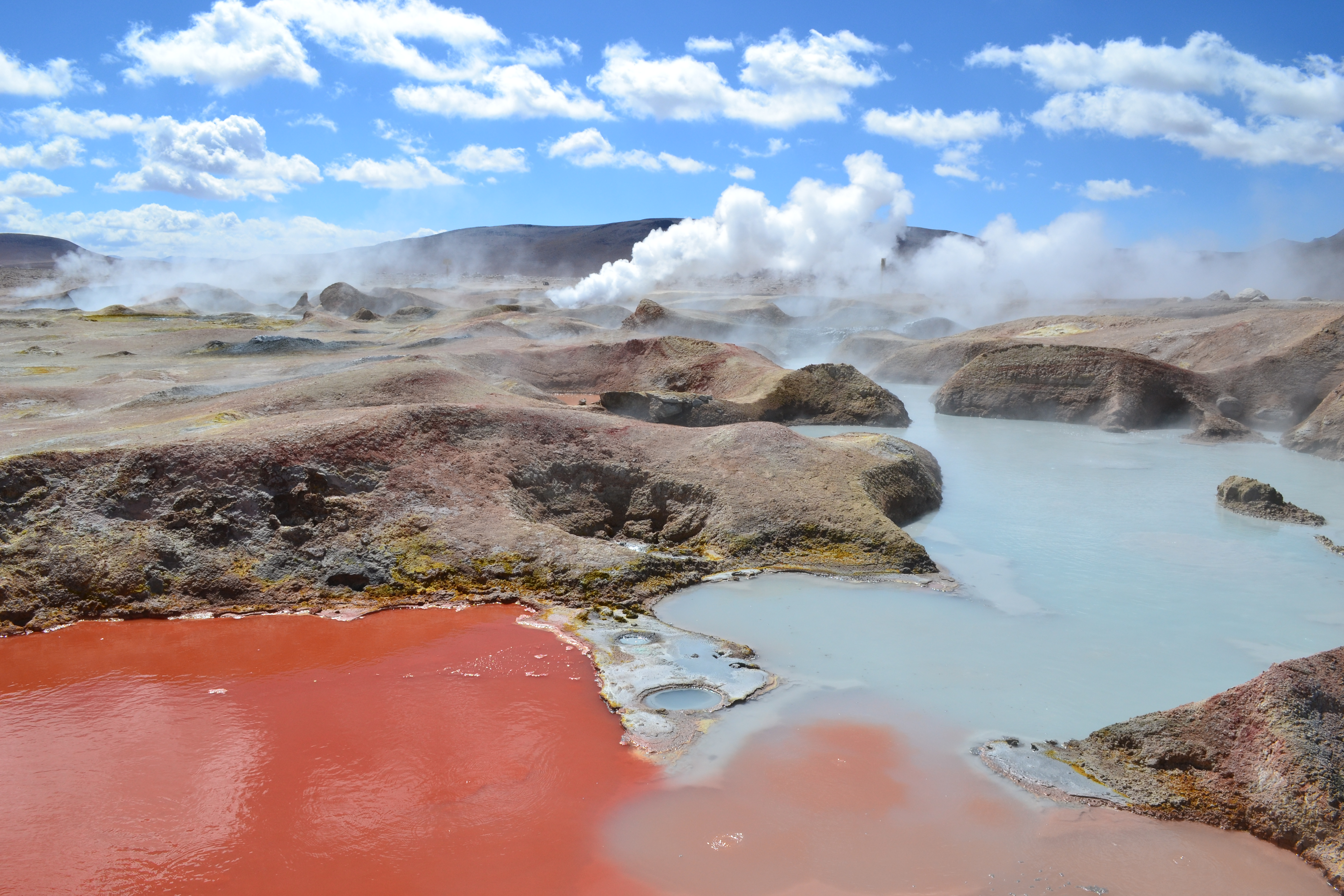
Sol de Mañana (Morning Sun in Spanish), a geothermal field in Eduardo Avaroa Andean Fauna National Reserve, is characterized by intense volcanic activity with fumaroles and geysers, emitting pressurized steam up to 50 meters high.

The geology of Bolivia comprises a variety of different lithologies as well as tectonic and sedimentary environments. On a synoptic scale, geological units coincide with topographical units. Most elementally, the country is divided into a mountainous western area affected by the subduction processes in the Pacific and an eastern lowlands of stable platforms and shields. The Cordillera Occidental has several active volcanoes and geothermal areas. The Cordillera Central was extensively mined for silver and tin. The Cordillera Oriental is the eastern continuation of the Central Cordillera as a fold and thrust belt.

The eastern lowlands and sub-Andean zone in Santa Cruz, Chuquisaca, and Tarija Departments was once a Paleozoic sedimentary basin that hosts valuable hydrocarbon reserves. Further east close to the border with Brazil lies the Guaporé Shield, made up of stable Precambrian crystalline rock.

=== Climate ===
Bolivia map of Köppen climate classification

The climate varies drastically from the tropics in the eastern llanos to a polar climate in the western Andes. The summers are warm, humid in the east and dry in the west, with rains that often modify temperatures, humidity, winds, atmospheric pressure and evaporation, yielding very different climates in different areas. When the climatological phenomenon known as El Niño takes place, it causes great alterations in the weather. Winters are very cold in the west, and it snows in the mountain ranges, while in the western regions, windy days are more common. The autumn is dry in the non-tropical regions.

- Llanos. A humid tropical climate with an average temperature of 25 °C (77 °F). The wind coming from the Amazon rainforest causes significant rainfall. In May, there is low precipitation because of dry winds, and most days have clear skies. Even so, winds from the south, called surazos, can bring cooler temperatures lasting several days.
- Altiplano. Desert-polar climates, with strong and cold winds. The average temperature ranges from 15 to 20 °C. At night, temperatures descend drastically to slightly above 0 °C, while during the day, the weather is dry, and solar radiation is high. Ground frosts occur every month, and snow is frequent.
- Valleys and Yungas. Temperate climate. The humid northeastern winds are pushed to the mountains, making this region very humid and rainy. Temperatures are cooler at higher elevations. Snow occurs at altitudes of 2,000 meters (6,600 ft).
- Chaco. Subtropical semi-arid climate. Rainy and humid in January and the rest of the year, with warm days and cold nights.

=== Impact of climate change ===
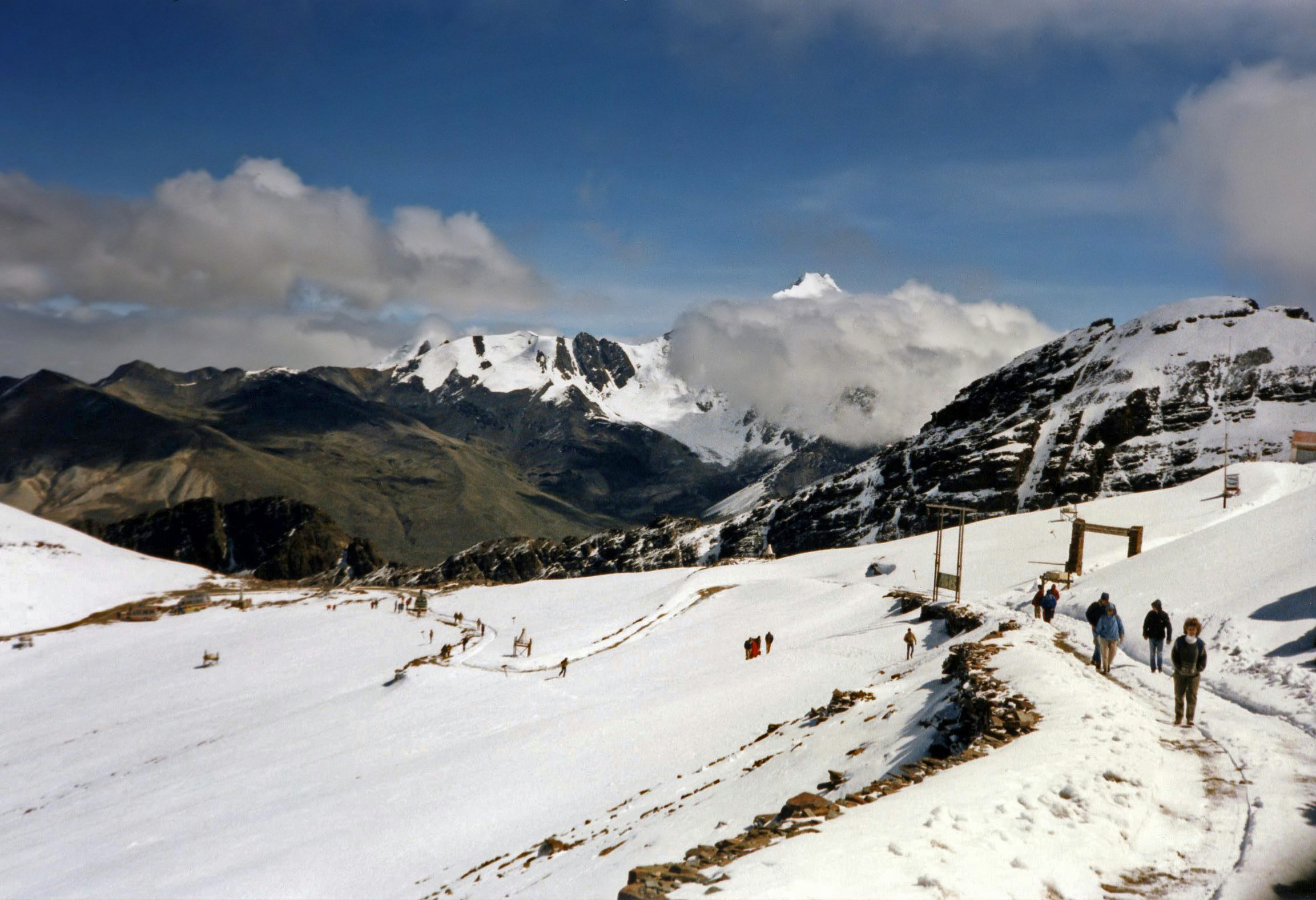
Chacaltaya ski resort, La Paz Department

Bolivia is especially vulnerable to the negative consequences of climate change. Twenty percent of the world's tropical glaciers are located within the country, which are more sensitive to change in temperature due to the tropical climate at lower elevations. Temperatures in the Andes increased by 0.1 °C per decade from 1939 to 1998, and more recently the rate of increase has tripled (to 0.33 °C per decade from 1980 to 2005), causing glaciers to recede at an accelerated pace and create water shortages in Andean agricultural towns. Farmers have taken to temporary city jobs when there is poor yield for their crops, while others have started permanently leaving the agricultural sector and are migrating to nearby towns for other forms of work; some view these migrants as the first generation of climate refugees. Cities that are neighbouring agricultural land, like El Alto, face the challenge of providing services to the influx of new migrants; because there is no alternative water source, the city's water source is now being constricted.

Bolivia's government and other agencies have acknowledged the need to instill new policies battling the effects of climate change. The World Bank has provided funding through the Climate Investment Funds and are using the Pilot Program for Climate Resilience to construct irrigation systems, protect riverbanks and basins, and work on building water resources with the help of indigenous communities.

=== Biodiversity ===
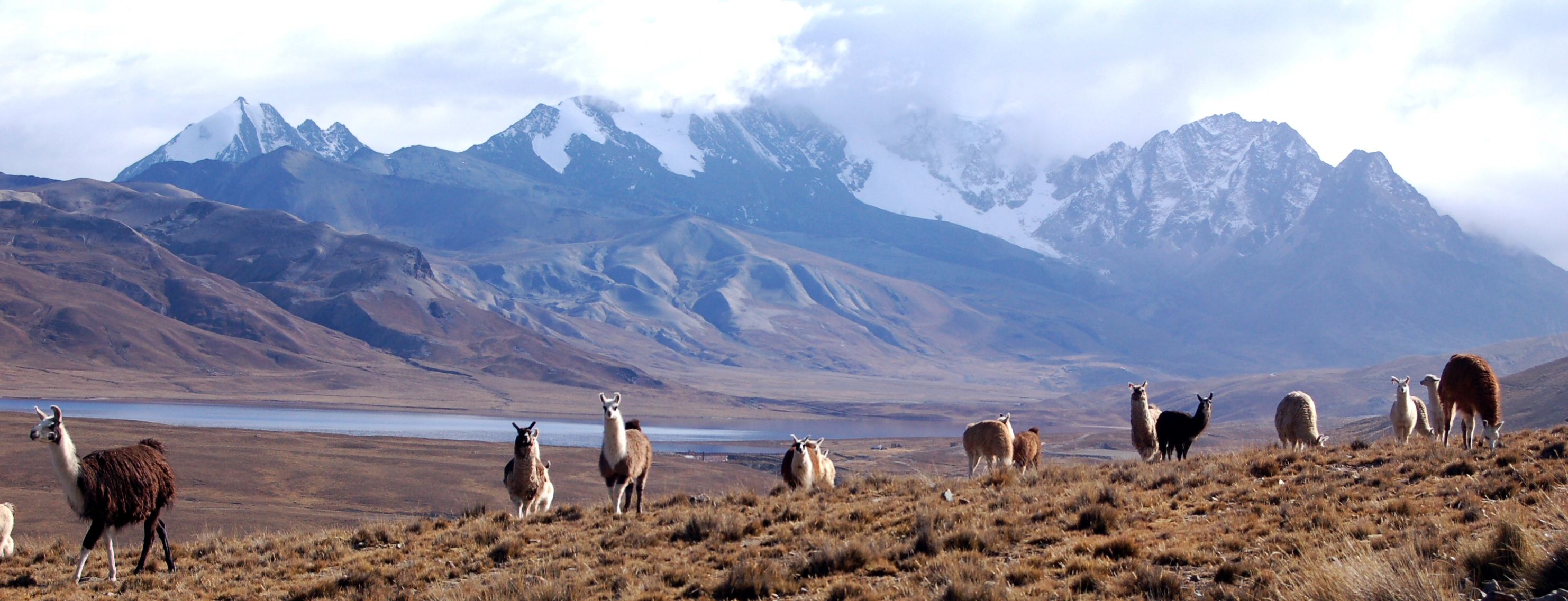
A herd of llamas in the Bolivian Andes

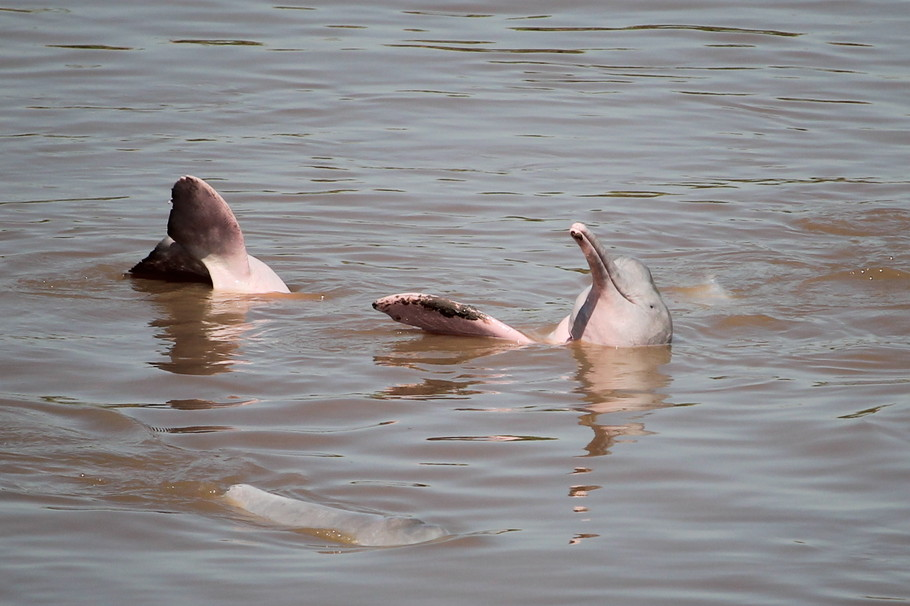
The Bolivian river dolphin, the largest freshwater dolphin in the world

Bolivia is part of the "Like-Minded Megadiverse Countries". The variable altitudes, ranging from 90–6,542 meters (295–21,463 ft) above sea level, allow for a vast biologic diversity. The country comprises four types of biomes, 32 ecological regions, and 199 ecosystems. There are several natural parks and reserves such as the Noel Kempff Mercado National Park, the Madidi National Park, the Tunari National Park, the Eduardo Avaroa Andean Fauna National Reserve, and the Kaa-Iya del Gran Chaco National Park and Integrated Management Natural Area.

Bolivia boasts over 17,000 species of seed plants, including over 1,200 species of fern, 1,500 species of marchantiophyta and moss, and at least 800 species of fungus. In addition, there are more than 3,000 species of medicinal plants. Bolivia is considered the place of origin for such species as peppers and chili peppers, peanuts, the common beans, yuca, and several species of palm. Bolivia naturally produces over 4,000 kinds of potatoes.

Bolivia has more than 2,900 animal species, including 398 mammals, over 1,400 birds (about 14% of birds known in the world, the sixth most diverse country in terms of bird species), 204 amphibians, 277 reptiles, and 635 fresh water fish. There are more than 3,000 types of butterfly. In 2020 a new species of snake, the mountain fer-de-lance viper, was discovered in Bolivia. In 2026, a new species of cat was discovered in the Yungas Cloud Forest. Leopoldus tilcayo or tilcayo cats are 18 inches long and weigh 3 pounds or less.

=== Environmental policy ===
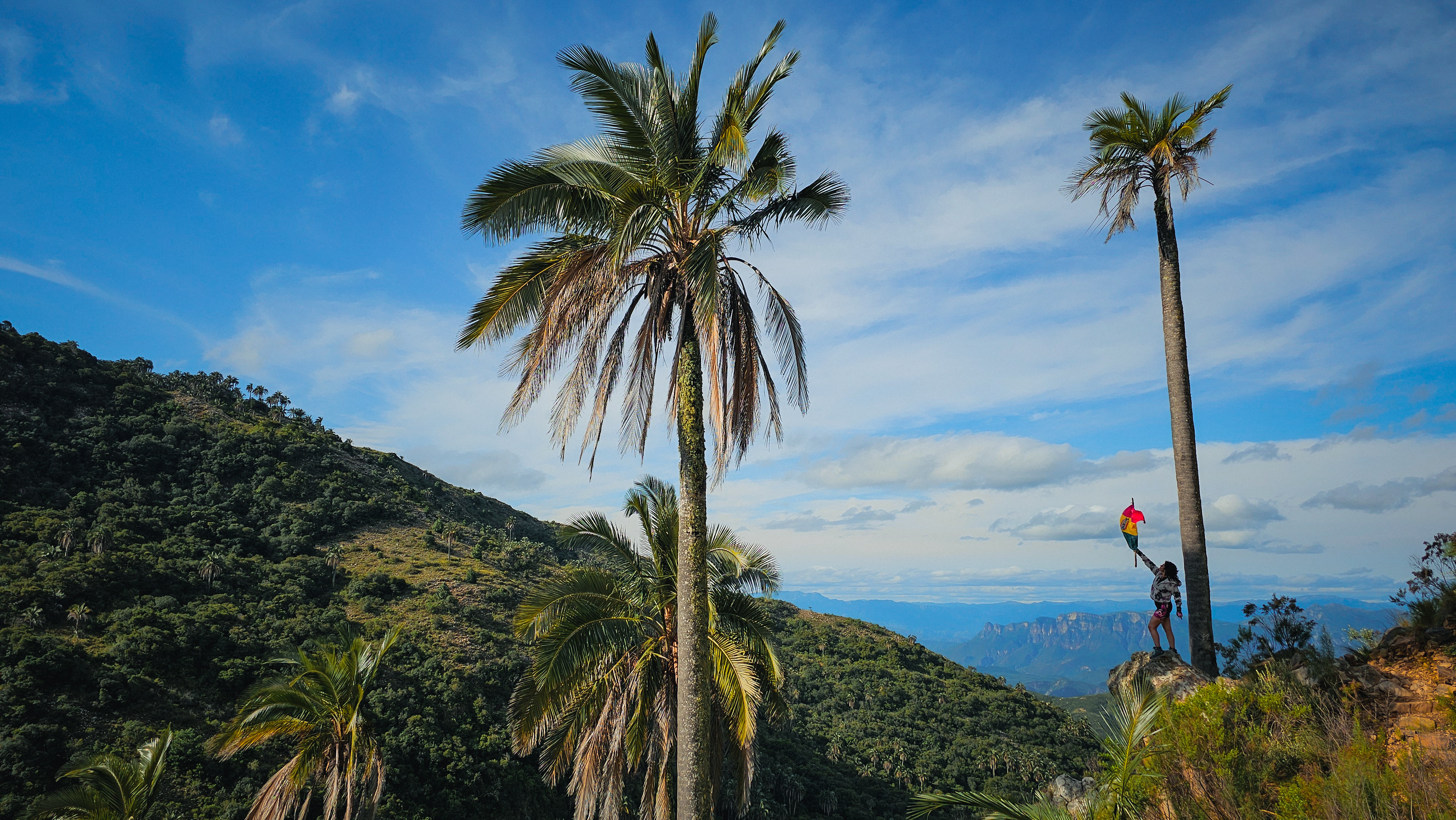
El Palmar Nature Preserve, in northern Chuquisaca

A Ministry of Environment and Water was created in 2006 during the Morales presidency, when he reversed the privatization of the water distribution sector in the 1990s by President Gonzalo Sánchez de Lozada. The constitution of 2009 makes access to water a fundamental right. In July 2010, at the initiative of Bolivia, the United Nations passed a resolution recognizing as "fundamental" the "right to safe and clean drinking water".

In 2013, the Law of the Rights of Mother Earth was passed, which accords nature the same rights as humans. The law defines Mother Earth as "a collective subject of public interest," declaring both Mother Earth and life-systems (which combine human communities and ecosystems) as titleholders of inherent rights specified in the law. The short law proclaims the creation of the Defensoría de la Madre Tierra, a counterpart to the human rights ombudsman office known as the Defensoría del Pueblo, but leaves its structuring and creation to future legislation.

== Government and politics ==
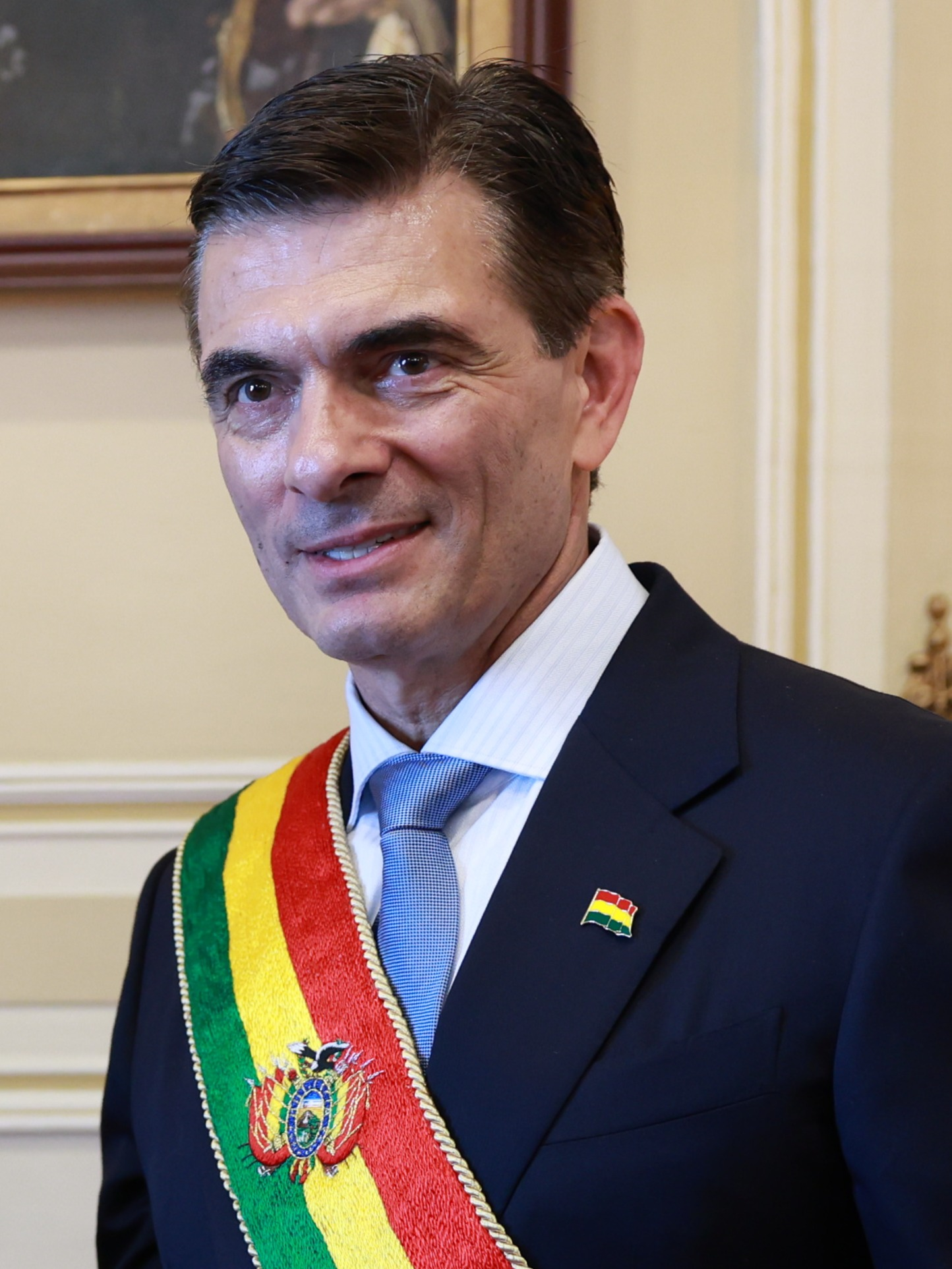
Rodrigo Paz
President

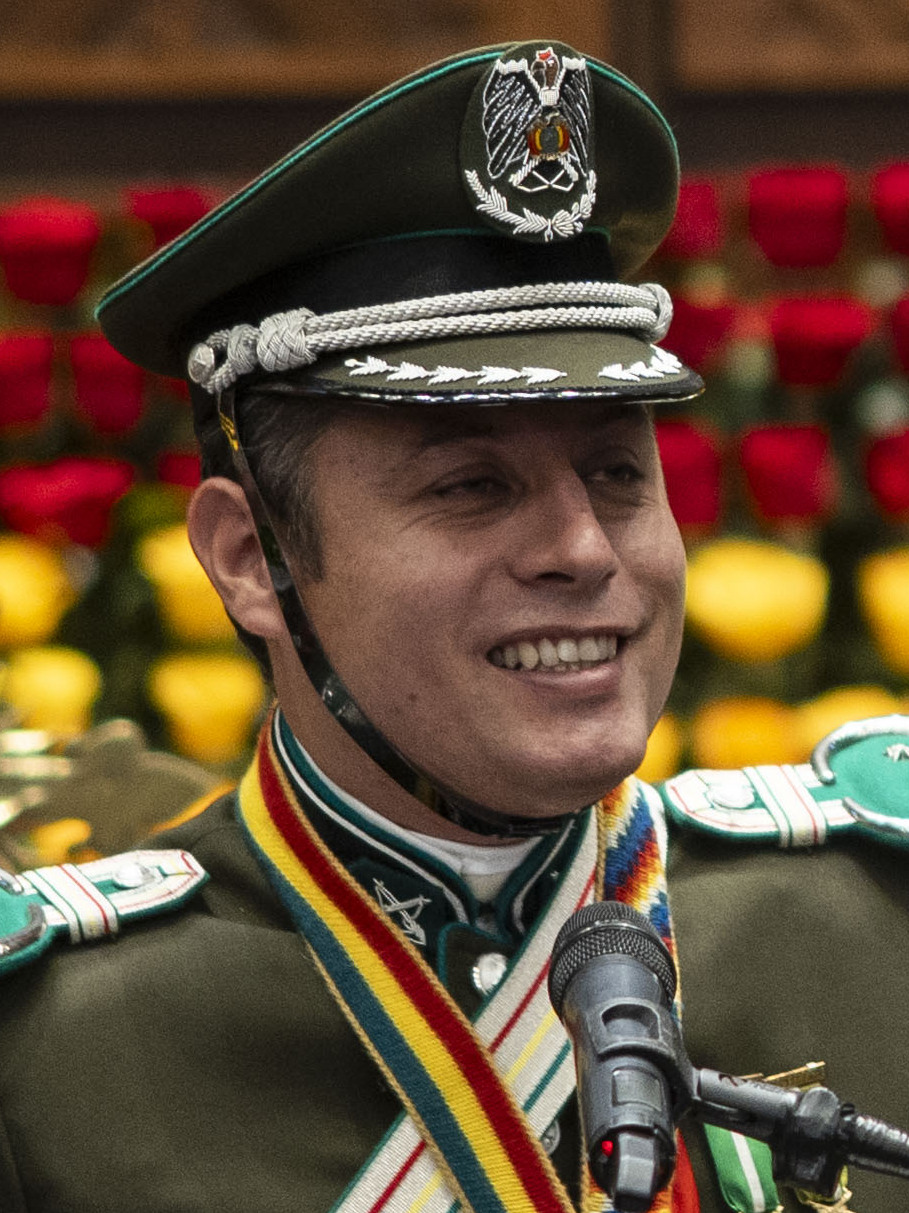
Edmand Lara
Vice President

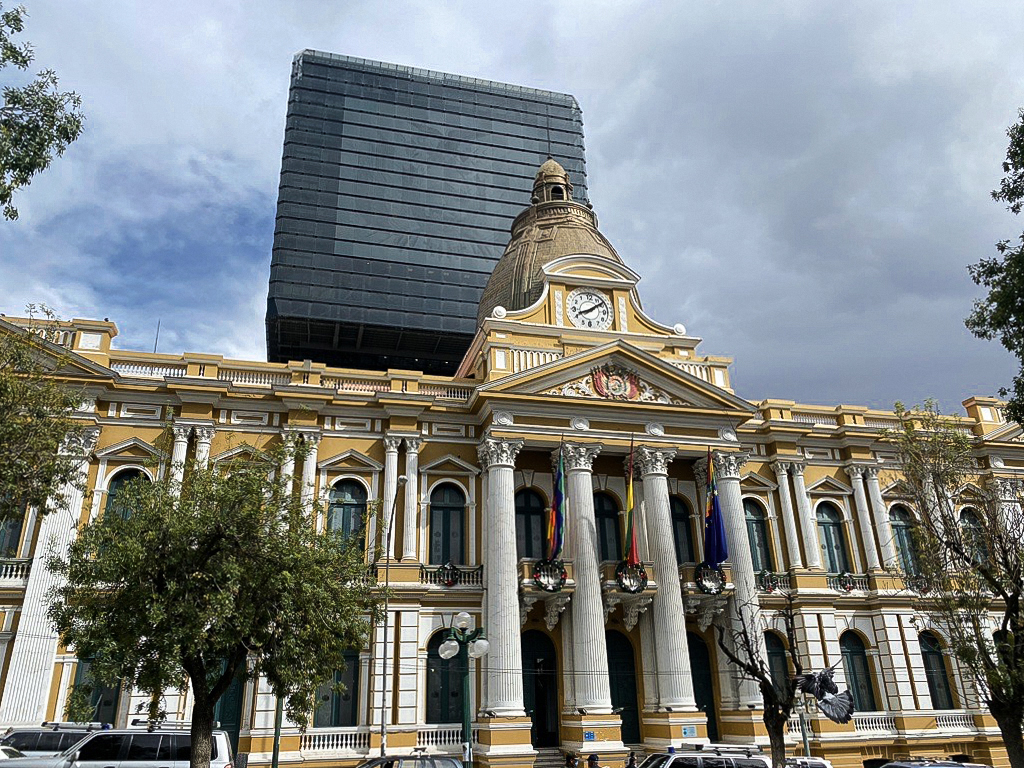
Building of the Plurinational Legislative Assembly in central La Paz

Bolivia has been governed by democratically elected governments since 1982; prior to that, it was governed by various dictatorships. Presidents Hernán Siles Zuazo (1982–1985) and Víctor Paz Estenssoro (1985–1989) began a tradition of ceding power peacefully which has continued, although three presidents have stepped down in the face of extraordinary circumstances: Gonzalo Sánchez de Lozada in 2003, Carlos Mesa in 2005, and Evo Morales in 2019.

Bolivia's multiparty democracy has seen a wide variety of parties in the presidency and parliament, although the Revolutionary Nationalist Movement, Nationalist Democratic Action, and the Revolutionary Left Movement predominated from 1985 to 2005. On 11 November 2019, all senior governmental positions were vacated following the resignation of Evo Morales and his government. On 13 November 2019, Jeanine Áñez, a former senator representing Beni, declared herself acting President of Bolivia. Luis Arce was president from 2020 to 2025. Rodrigo Paz was elected on 19 October 2025; he took office as president on 8 November 2025.

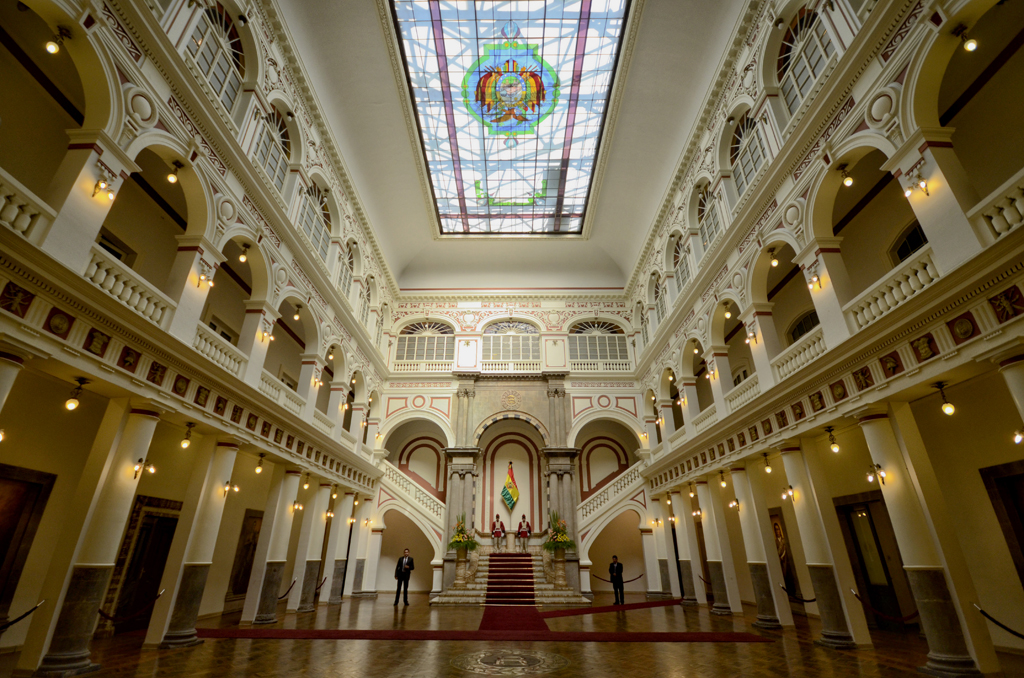
Interior of the Palacio Quemado, the former residence and main office for the President of Bolivia

The constitution provides for balanced executive, legislative, judicial, and electoral powers, as well as several levels of autonomy. The traditionally strong executive branch tends to overshadow the Congress, whose role is generally limited to debating and approving legislation initiated by the executive. The judiciary, consisting of the Supreme Court and departmental and lower courts, has long been riddled with corruption and inefficiency. Through revisions to the constitution in 1994, and subsequent laws, the government has initiated potentially far-reaching reforms in the judicial system as well as increasing decentralizing powers to departments, municipalities, and indigenous territories.

The executive branch is headed by a president and vice president and consists of a variable number (currently 20) of government ministries. The president is elected to a five-year term by popular vote and governs from the Presidential Palace (popularly called the Burnt Palace, Palacio Quemado) in La Paz. In the case that no candidate receives an absolute majority of the popular vote or more than 40% of the vote with an advantage of more than 10% over the second-place finisher, a run-off is to be held among the two candidates most voted.

The Asamblea Legislativa Plurinacional (Plurinational Legislative Assembly or National Congress) has two chambers. The Cámara de Diputados (Chamber of Deputies) has 130 members elected to five-year terms, 63 from single-member districts (circunscripciones), 60 by proportional representation, and seven by the minority indigenous peoples of seven departments. The Cámara de Senadores (Chamber of Senators) has 36 members (four per department). Members of the Assembly are elected to five-year terms. The body has its headquarters on the Plaza Murillo in La Paz, but also holds honorary sessions elsewhere in Bolivia. The Vice President serves as titular head of the combined Assembly.

The judiciary consists of the Supreme Tribunal of Justice, the Plurinational Constitutional Tribunal, the Judiciary Council, Agrarian and Environmental Court, and District (departmental) and lower courts. In October 2011, Bolivia held its first judicial elections to choose members of the national courts by popular vote, a reform brought about by Morales.

The Plurinational Electoral Organ is an independent branch of government which replaced the National Electoral Court in 2010. The branch consists of the Supreme Electoral Courts, the nine Departmental Electoral Court, Electoral Judges, the anonymously selected Juries at Election Tables, and Electoral Notaries. Wilfredo Ovando presides over the seven-member Supreme Electoral Court. Its operations are mandated by the constitution and regulated by the Electoral Regime Law (Law 026, passed 2010). The organ's first elections were the country's first judicial election in 2011, and five municipal special elections held in 2011.

Under the 2006–2019 Morales presidency, the country saw significant economic growth and political stability but was also accused of democratic backsliding and was described as a competitive authoritarian regime. Freedom House classifies Bolivia as a partly-free democracy as of 2023, with a 66/100 score. According to International IDEA's Global State of Democracy Indices and Democracy Tracker, Bolivia performs in the mid-range on overall democratic measures, with particular strengths in civic engagement and electoral participation.

=== Capital ===
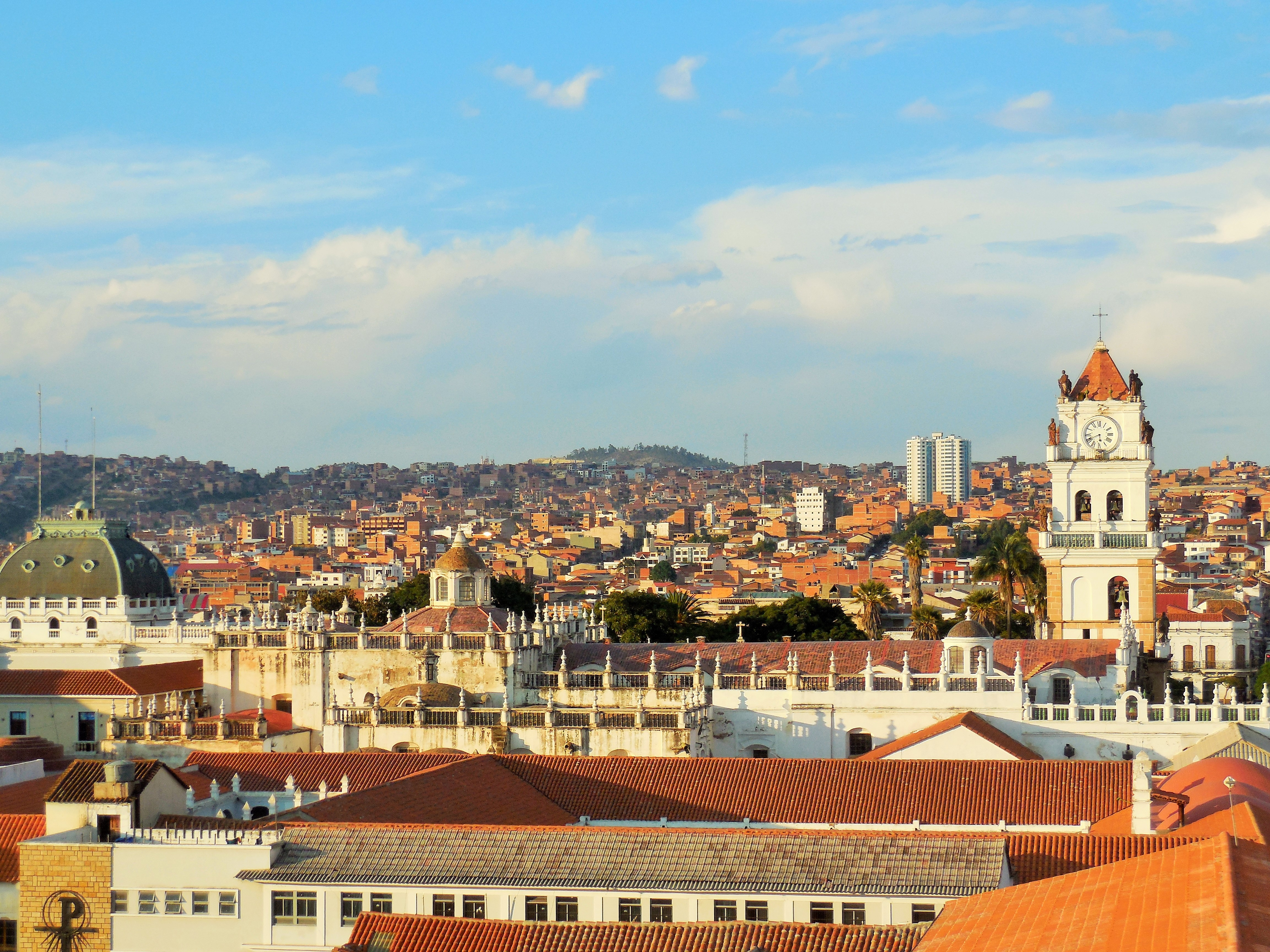
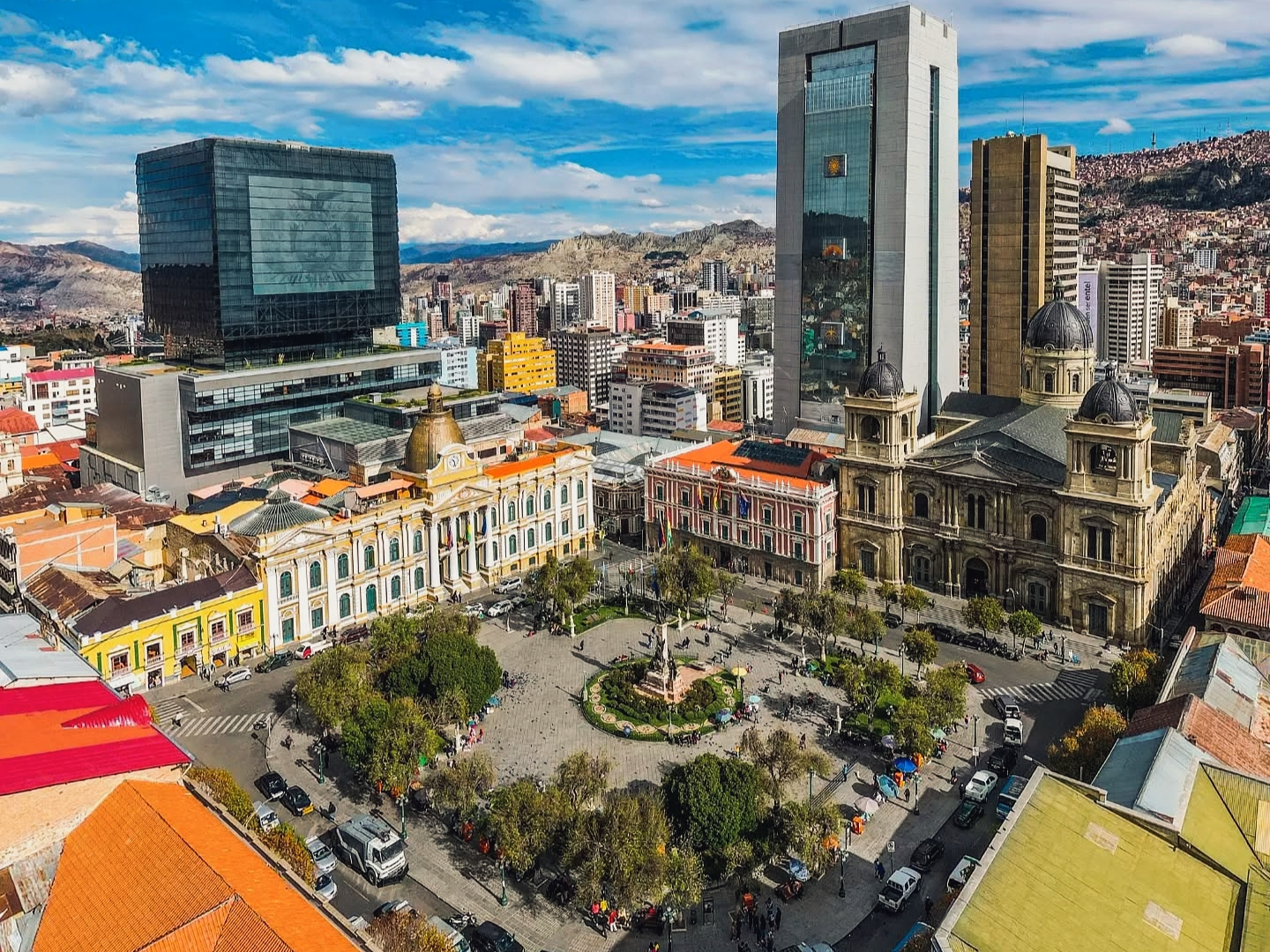
Sucre is Bolivia's constitutional capital and seat of the judiciary, while La Paz serves as the seat of government and holds the executive and legislative branches.

Bolivia has its constitutionally recognized capital in Sucre, while La Paz is the seat of government. La Plata (now Sucre) was proclaimed the provisional capital of the newly independent Alto Peru (later, Bolivia) on 1 July 1826. On 12 July 1839, President José Miguel de Velasco proclaimed a law naming the city as the capital of Bolivia and renaming it in honor of the revolutionary leader Antonio José de Sucre. The seat of government moved to La Paz at the start of the 20th century as a consequence of Sucre's relative remoteness from economic activity after the decline of Potosí and its silver industry and of the Liberal Party in the Acre War.

The 2009 constitution assigns the role of national capital to Sucre, not referring to La Paz in the text. In addition to being the constitutional capital, the Supreme Court is located in Sucre, making it the judicial capital. Nonetheless, the Palacio Quemado (the Presidential Palace and seat of executive power) is located in La Paz, as are the National Congress and Plurinational Electoral Organ. La Paz thus continues to be the seat of government.

=== Administrative divisions ===
Bolivia has nine departments—Pando, La Paz, Beni, Oruro, Cochabamba, Santa Cruz, Potosí, Chuquisaca, Tarija. There are four levels of decentralization: 1) Departmental government is constituted by the Departmental Assembly, with rights over the legislation of the department. The department governor is chosen by universal suffrage. 2) Municipal government is constituted by a Municipal Council which is responsible for legislation of the municipality. The municipality's mayor is chosen by universal suffrage. 3) Regional government is formed by several provinces or municipalities of geographical continuity within a department. It is constituted by a Regional Assembly. 4) Original indigenous government is constituted by self-governance of original indigenous people on the ancient territories where they live.

No.	Department	Capital
1	Pando	Cobija	Territorial division of Bolivia
2	La Paz	La Paz	Territorial division of Bolivia
3	Beni	Trinidad	Territorial division of Bolivia
4	Oruro	Oruro	Territorial division of Bolivia
5	Cochabamba	Cochabamba	Territorial division of Bolivia
6	Santa Cruz	Santa Cruz de la Sierra	Territorial division of Bolivia
7	Potosí	Potosí	Territorial division of Bolivia
8	Chuquisaca	Sucre	Territorial division of Bolivia
9	Tarija	Tarija	Territorial division of Bolivia

While the administrative divisions have similar status under governmental jurisprudence, each department varies in quantitative and qualitative factors. Generally speaking, departments can be grouped either by geography or by political-cultural orientation. For example, Santa Cruz, Beni and Pando make up the low-lying "Camba" heartlands of the Amazon, Moxos and Chiquitanía. When considering political orientation, Beni, Pando, Santa Cruz, Tarija are generally grouped for regionalist autonomy movements; this region is known as the "Media Luna". Conversely, La Paz, Oruro, Potosí, Cochabamba have been traditionally associated with Andean politics and culture. Today, Chuquisaca vacillates between the Andean cultural bloc and the Camba bloc.

=== Foreign relations ===
Bolivia's foreign relations have fluctuated since the end of World War II, often aligning with the dominant ideologies of global superpowers—alternating between neoliberal approaches and socialist agendas presented as nationalism. Over the recent decades, Bolivia has been an active member of regional trade blocs such as Mercosur and is a founding member of the Andean Community of Nations. It is a member of several international organizations such as the Organization of American States (OAS) and the United Nations.

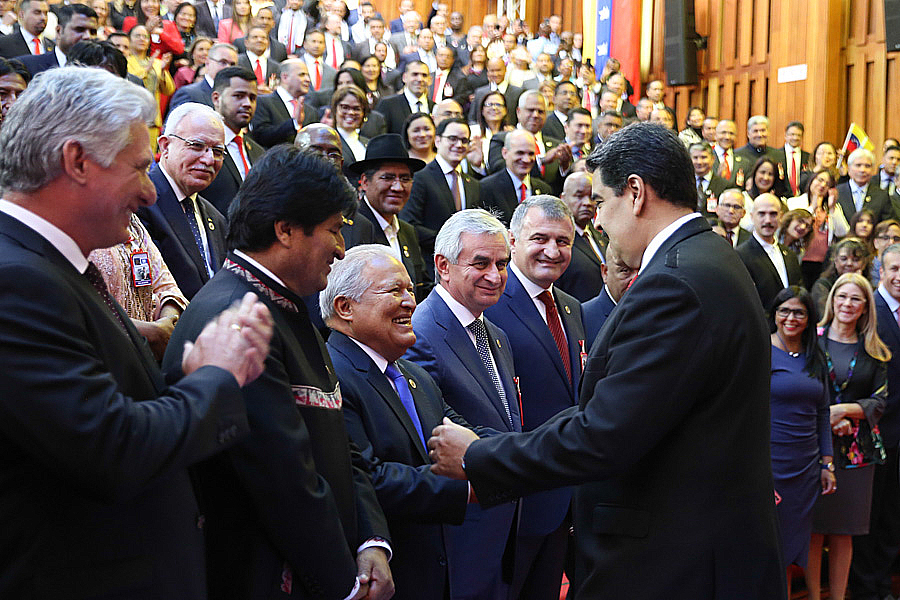
The presidents of Cuba, Bolivia, and El Salvador (from l. to r.) greet Nicolás Maduro at his second inauguration as Venezuela's president, in Caracas, on 10 January 2019.

Bolivia has historically experienced stressed relations with Chile, including the Obligation to Negotiate Access to the Pacific Ocean (Bolivia v. Chile) international court resolution, but the two countries have agreed to work on improving relations. Although Bolivia lost its Litoral Department—and thus access to a maritime coast—following the War of the Pacific in 1883, it has historically upheld a state policy asserting a maritime claim over that territory, seeking sovereign access to the Pacific Ocean and its maritime space. The issue has been presented before the OAS; in 1979, the OAS passed the 426 Resolution, which declares that the Bolivian problem is a hemispheric problem. On 4 April 1884, a truce was signed with Chile, whereby Chile gave facilities of access to Bolivian products through Antofagasta and freed the payment of export rights in the port of Arica. In October 1904, the Treaty of Peace and Friendship was signed, and Chile agreed to build a railway between Arica and La Paz, to improve access of Bolivian products to the ports. In 2018, the maritime dispute was taken to the International Court of Justice. The court ruled in support of the Chilean position and declared that although Chile may have held talks about a Bolivian corridor to the sea, the country was not required to negotiate one or to surrender its territory.

The Special Economical Zone for Bolivia in Ilo is a special economic area of 5 kilometers (3.1 miles) of maritime coast, and a total extension of 358 hectares (880 acres), called Mar Bolivia ("Sea Bolivia"), where Bolivia may maintain a free port near Ilo, Peru under its administration and operation for a period of 99 years starting in 1992; once that time has passed, all the construction and territory revert to the Peruvian government. Since 1964, Bolivia has had its own port facilities in the Bolivian Free Port in Rosario, Argentina. This port is located on the Paraná River, which is directly connected to the Atlantic Ocean.

In 2018, Bolivia signed the UN treaty on the Prohibition of Nuclear Weapons. Bolivia is the 68th most peaceful country in the world, according to the 2024 Global Peace Index.

=== Military ===
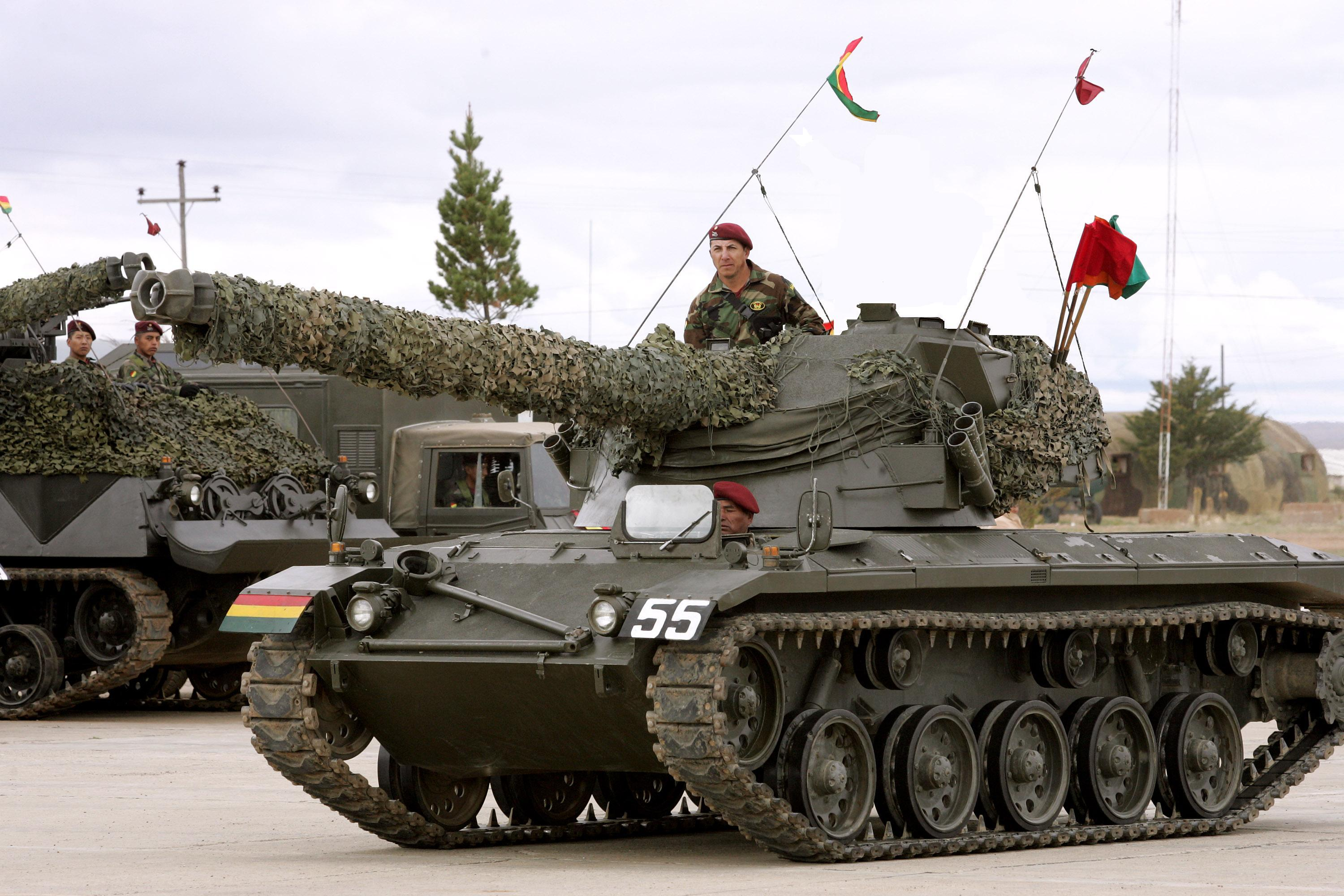
An SK-105 Kürassier tank destroyer of the Bolivian Army

The Bolivian military comprises three branches: Ejército (Army), Naval (Navy) and Fuerza Aérea (Air Force). The Bolivian army has around 31,500 men. There are six military regions (regiones militares) in the army. The army is organized into ten divisions. Although it is landlocked, Bolivia keeps a navy. The naval force was about 5,000 strong in 2008. The air force has nine air bases.

=== Law and crime ===
There are 54 prisons in Bolivia, which incarcerate around 8,700 people as of 2010. The prisons are managed by the Penitentiary Regime Directorate (Spanish: Dirección de Régimen Penitenciario). There are 17 prisons in departmental capital cities and 36 provincial prisons.

== Economy ==
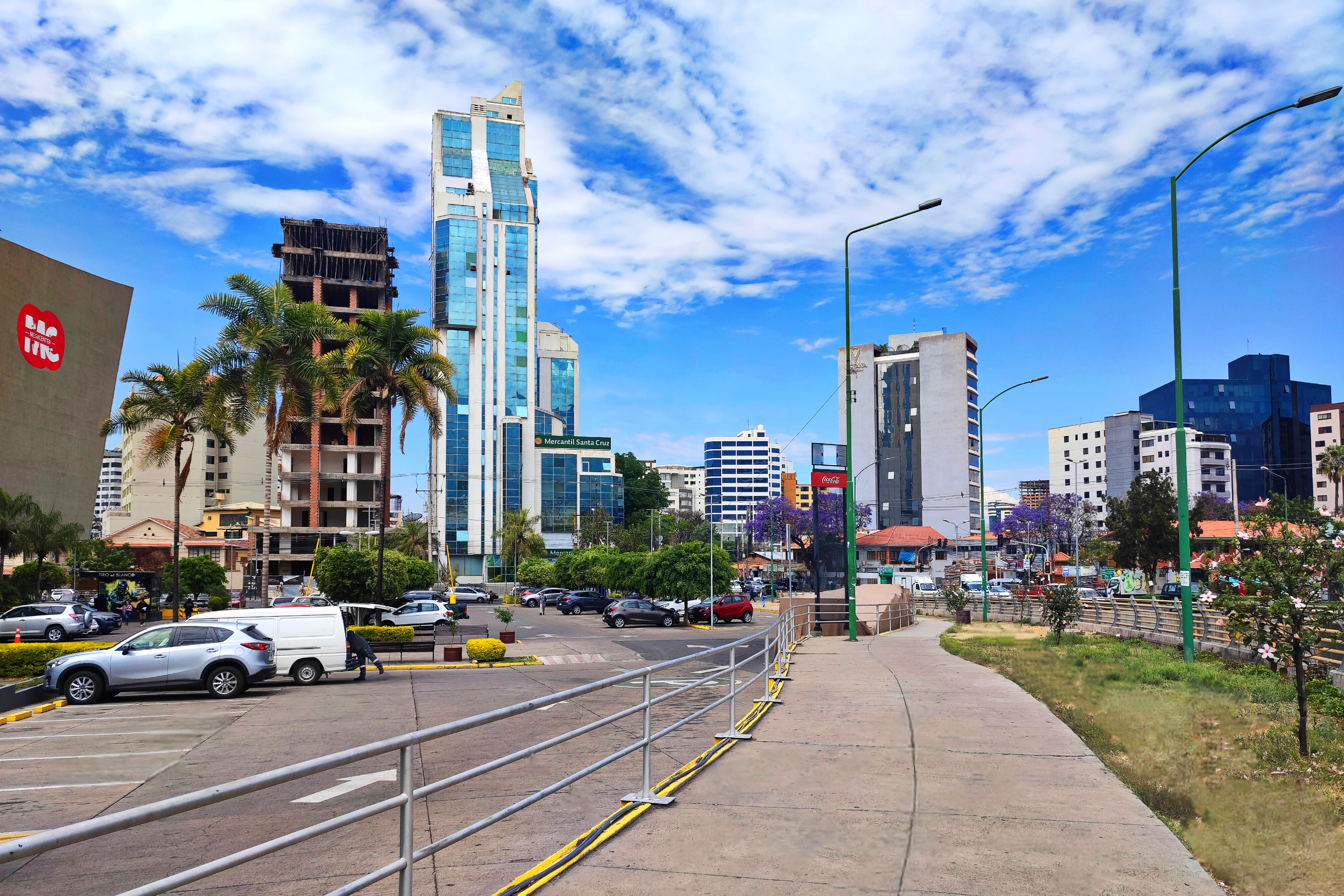
Cochabamba, is one of the three main economic centers

Driven largely by its natural resources, Bolivia has become a regional leader in measures of economic growth, fiscal stability and foreign reserves, although it remains a historically poor country. The estimated 2012 gross domestic product (GDP) totaled $27.43 billion at official exchange rate and $56.14 billion at purchasing power parity. Despite a series of mostly political setbacks, between 2006 and 2009 the Morales administration spurred growth higher than at any point in the preceding 30 years. The growth was accompanied by a moderate decrease in inequality. Under Morales, per capita GDP doubled from US$1,182 in 2006 to US$2,238 in 2012. GDP growth under Morales averaged 5 percent per year, and in 2014 only Panama and the Dominican Republic performed better in all of Latin America. Nominal GDP increased from 11.5 billion in 2006 to 41 billion in 2019. 2014, before a strong decline, boasted the highest proportional rate of financial reserves of any nation in the world, with a rainy day fund totaling some US$15 billion or nearly two-thirds of total annual GDP, up from a fifth of GDP in 2005.

=== Agriculture ===
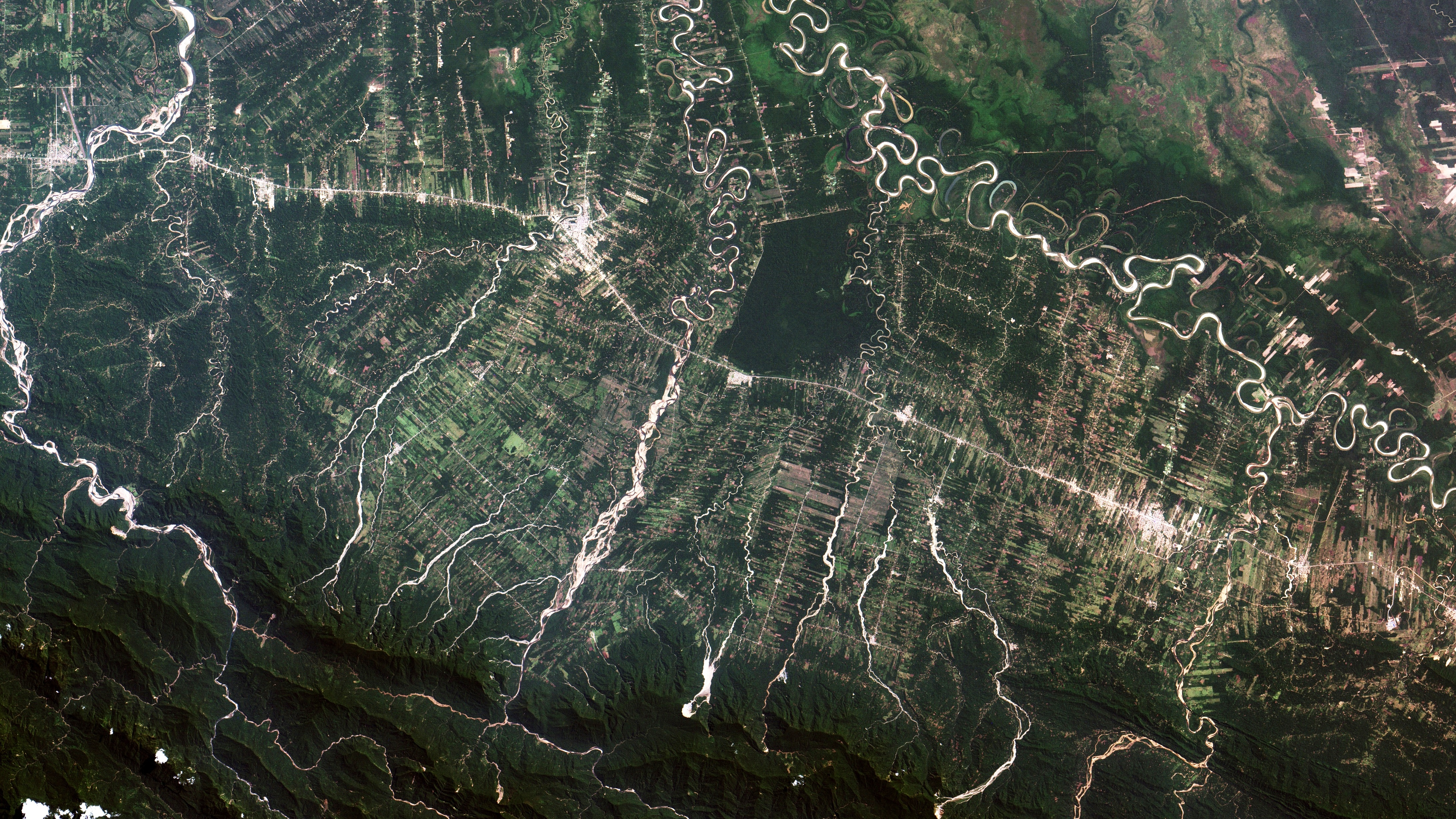
Ivirgarzama, an important agricultural region for the cultivation of bananas, citrus fruits, pineapples and rice

Agriculture is less relevant in the GDP compared to the rest of Latin America. The country produces close to 10 million tons of sugarcane per year and is the 10th largest producer of soybean in the world. It also has considerable yields of maize, potato, sorghum, banana, rice, and wheat. The largest exports are based on soy (soybean meal and soybean oil). The culture of soy was brought by Brazilians to the country: in 2006, almost 50% of soy producers in Bolivia were people from Brazil or descendants of Brazilians. The first Brazilian producers began to arrive in the 1990s. Before that, there was a lot of land that was not used or where only subsistence agriculture was practiced. The most lucrative agricultural product continues to be coca, of which Bolivia is the world's third largest cultivator.

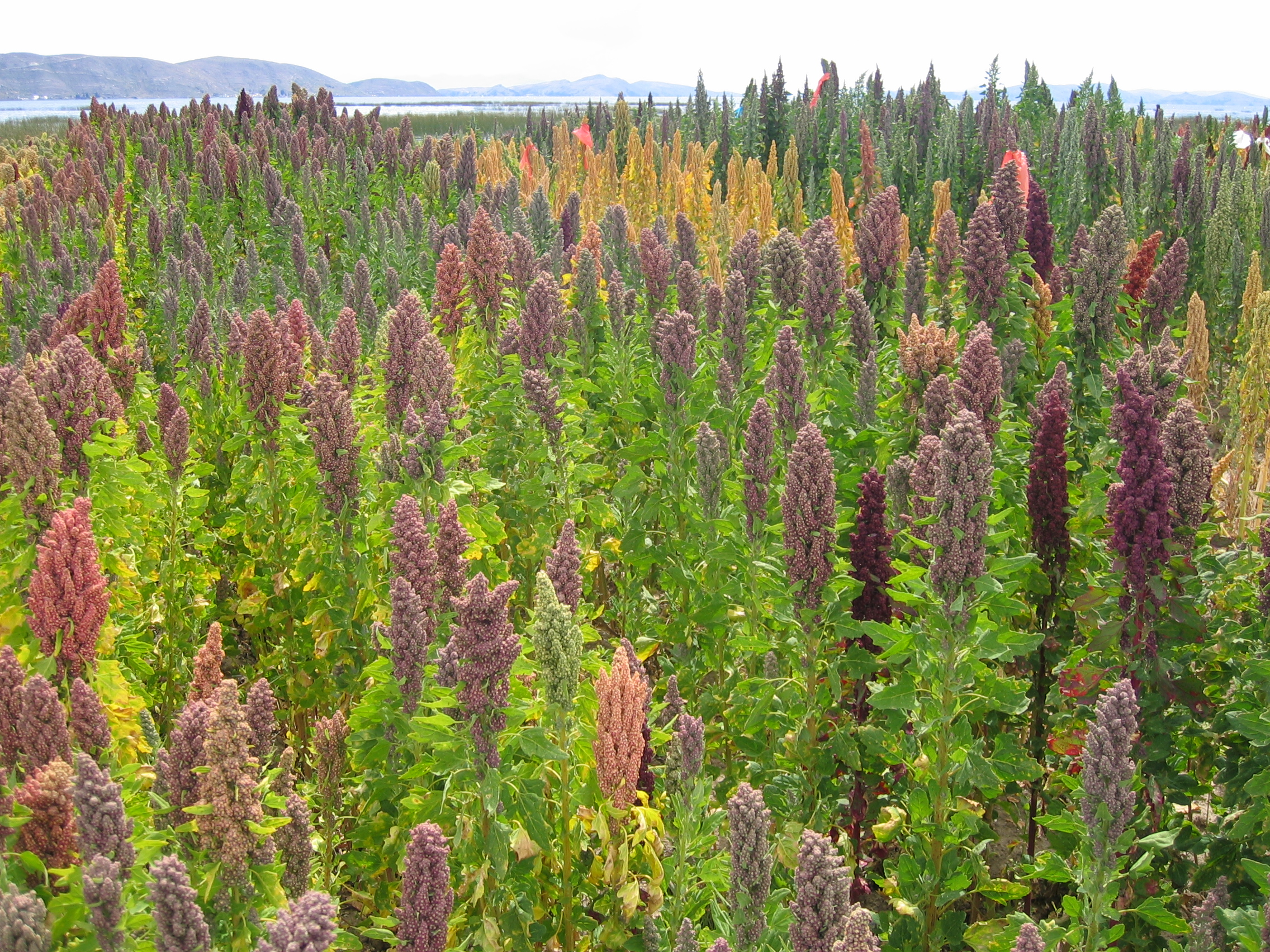
Quinoa field near Lake Titicaca. Bolivia is the world's second largest producer of the crop.

The agrarian reform promised by Morales – and approved in a referendum by nearly 80% of the population – has never been implemented. Intended to abolish latifundism by reducing the maximum size of properties that do not have an "economic and social function" to 5,000 hectares, with the remainder to be distributed among small agricultural workers and landless indigenous people, it was strongly opposed by the Bolivian oligarchy. In 2009, the government gave in to the agribusiness sector, which in return committed to end the pressure it was exerting and jeopardizing until the new constitution was in place. However, a series of economic reforms and projects have improved the condition of modest peasant families. They received farm machinery, tractors, fertilizers, seeds and breeding stock, while the state built irrigation systems, roads and bridges to make it easier for them to sell their produce in the markets. The situation of many indigenous people and small farmers was regularized through the granting of land titles for the land they were using.

In 2007, the government created a "Bank for Productive Development" through which small workers and agricultural producers can borrow easily, at low rates and with repayment terms adapted to agricultural cycles. As a result of improved banking supervision, borrowing rates have been reduced by a factor of three between 2014 and 2019 across all banking institutions for small and medium-sized agricultural producers. In addition, the law now requires banks to devote at least 60% of their resources to productive credits or to the construction of social housing.

With the creation of the Food Production Support Enterprise, the government sought to stabilize the domestic market for agricultural products by buying the best prices for the production of small and medium-sized farmers, thus forcing agribusinesses to offer them fairer remuneration. According to Vice President Àlvaro García Linera, "by setting the rules of the game, the State establishes a new balance of power that gives more power to small producers. Wealth is better redistributed to balance the power of the agribusiness sector. This generates stability, which allows the economy to flourish and benefits everyone.

=== Mineral resources ===
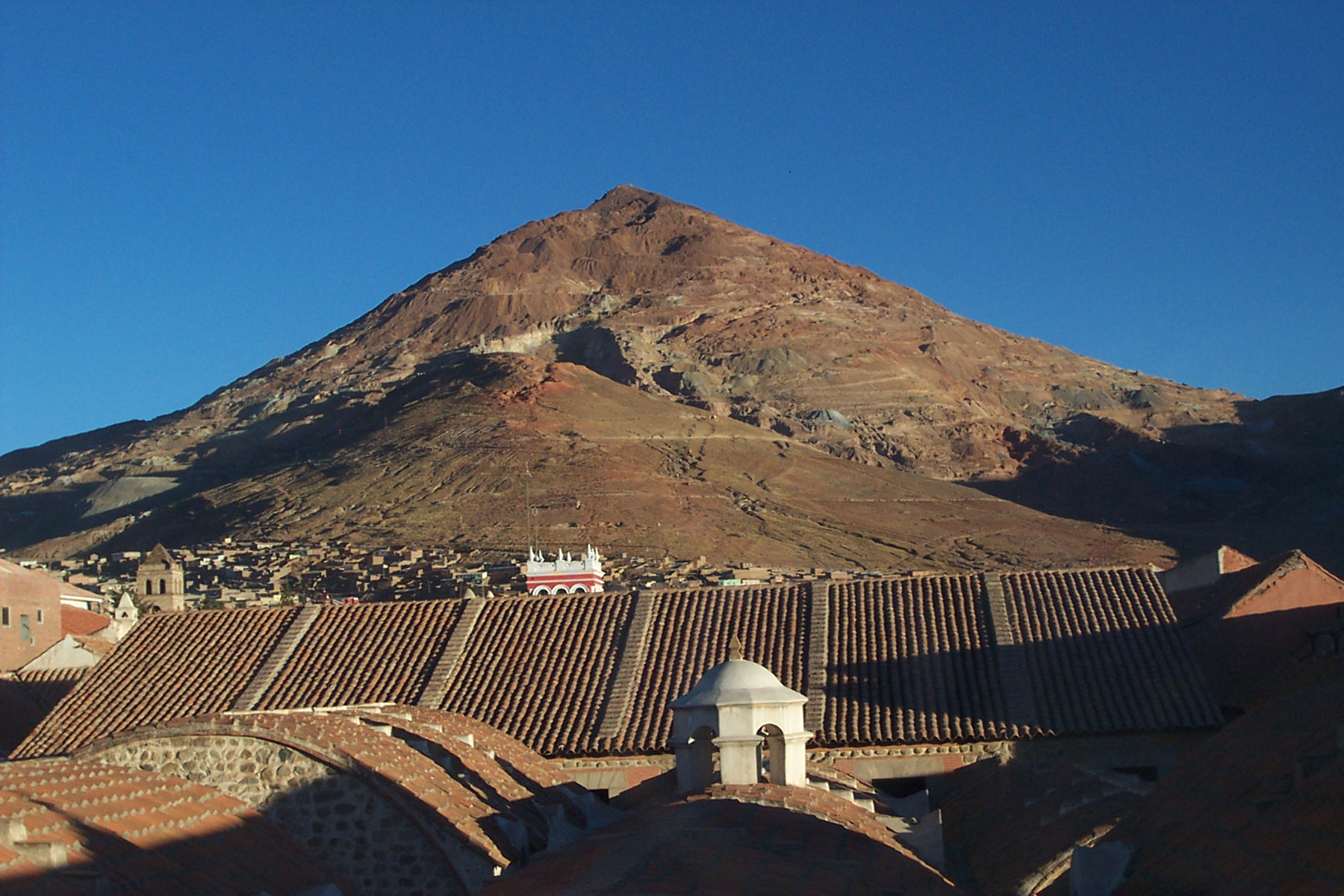
Cerro Rico in Potosí, an important mining site since the Spanish colonial times, continues to hold economic significance today.

While historically renowned for its vast mineral wealth the region is relatively under-explored in geological and mineralogical terms. Mining is a major sector of the economy, with most exports being dependent on it. In 2023, the country was the seventh largest world producer of silver; fifth largest world producer of tin and antimony; seventh largest producer of zinc, eighth largest producer of lead, fourth largest world producer of boron; and the sixth largest world producer of tungsten. Gold production averages around 25 tons per year; there is also some amethyst extraction.

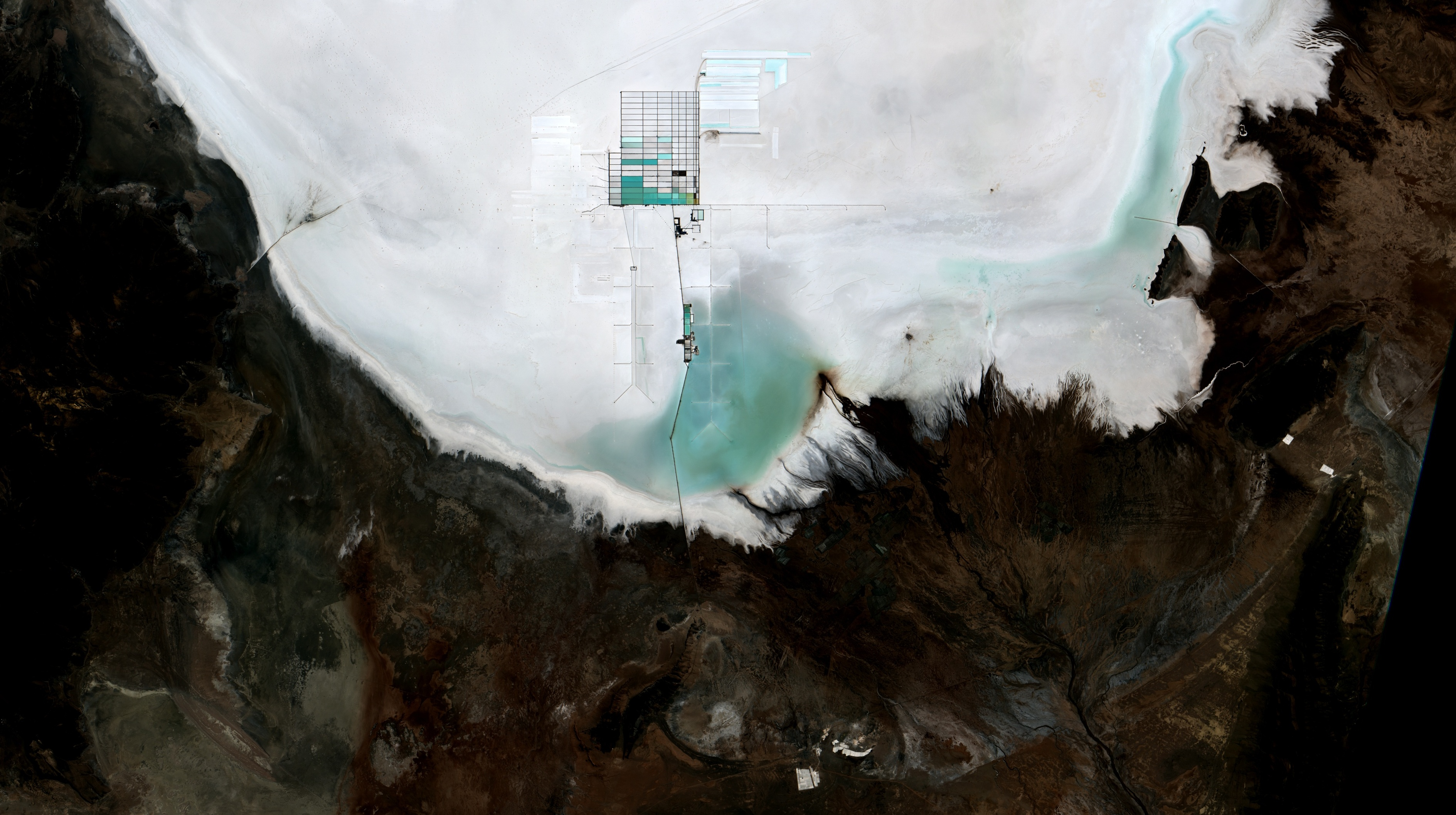
Lithium mine in the Salar de Uyuni

Bolivia has the world's largest lithium reserves, second largest antimony reserves, third largest iron ore reserves, sixth largest tin reserves, ninth largest lead, silver, and copper reserves, tenth largest zinc reserves, and undisclosed but productive reserves of gold and tungsten. Additionally, there is believed to be considerable reserves of uranium and nickel present in the largely under-explored eastern regions. Diamond reserves may also be present in some formations of the Serranías Chiquitanas in Santa Cruz Department.

Bolivia has the second largest natural gas reserves in South America. Its natural gas exports bring in millions of dollars per day in royalties, rents, and taxes. From 2007 to 2017, what is referred to as the "government take" on gas totaled approximately $22 billion.

The government held a binding referendum in 2005 on its hydrocarbon law. Among other provisions, the law requires that companies sell their production to the state hydrocarbons company Yacimientos Petroliferos Fiscales Bolivianos and for domestic demand to be met before exporting hydrocarbons and increased the state's royalties from natural gas. The passage of the law in opposition to President Mesa can be understood as part of the Bolivian gas conflict which ultimately resulted in election of Morales.

The US Geological Service estimates that Bolivia has 21 million tonnes of lithium, which represent at least 25% of world reserves – the largest in the world. However, to mine for it would involve disturbing Salar de Uyuni, an important natural feature which boosts tourism. The government does not want to destroy this unique natural landscape to meet the rising world demand for lithium. On the other hand, sustainable extraction of lithium is attempted by the government. This project is carried out by the public company "Recursos Evaporíticos" subsidiary of COMIBOL.

=== Tourism ===
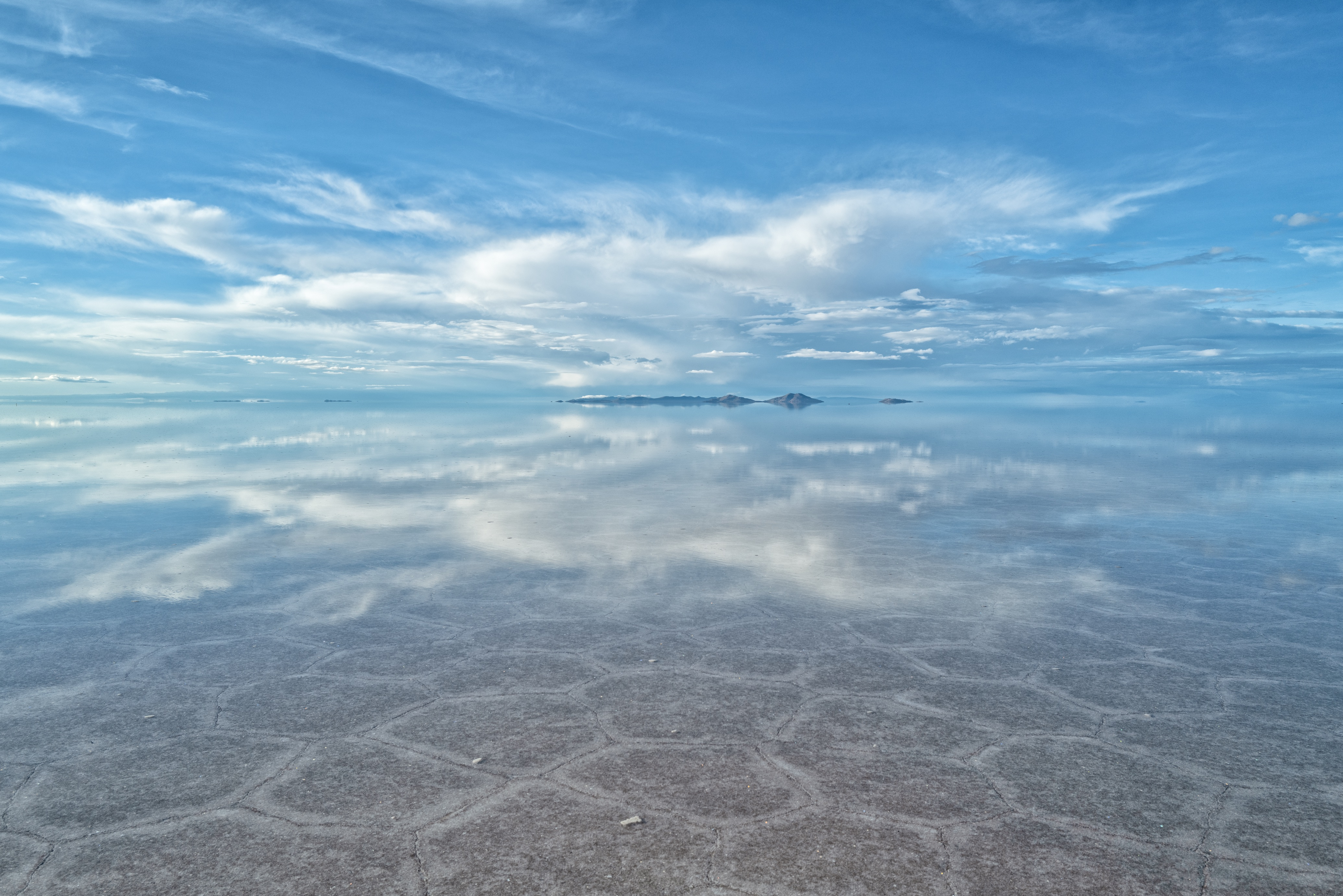
The Salar de Uyuni is the world's largest salt flat. Known for its vast white landscape, it becomes specially stunning during the rainy season.

Tourism in Bolivia is one of the key economic sectors. According to data from the National Institute of Statistics of Bolivia, there were over 1.24 million tourists in 2020 and around 2 million in 2023. The tourist industry has placed an emphasis on attracting ethnic diversity. The most visited places include Nevado Sajama, Torotoro National Park, Madidi National Park, Tiwanaku and the city of La Paz.

The best known of the various festivals is the "Carnaval de Oruro", which was among the first 19 "Masterpieces of the Oral and Intangible Heritage of Humanity", as proclaimed by UNESCO.

=== Transport ===
==== Roads ====
Yungas Road was called the "world's most dangerous road" by the Inter-American Development Bank. The northern portion of the road, much of it unpaved and without guardrails, was cut into the Cordillera Oriental in the 1930s. The fall from the narrow 12 feet (3.7 m) path is as much as 2,000 feet (610 m) in some places and humdity and rainfall cause poor conditions like mudslides and falling rocks. Each year over 25,000 bikers cycle along the 40 miles (64 km) road. In 2018, an Israeli woman was killed by a falling rock while cycling on the road.

The Apolo road goes deep into La Paz. Roads in this area were originally built to allow access to mines located near Charazani. Other noteworthy roads run to Coroico, Sorata, the Zongo Valley (Illimani mountain), and along the Cochabamba highway (carretera). According to researchers with the Center for International Forestry Research, Bolivia's road network was still underdeveloped as of 2014. In lowland areas of Bolivia there is less than 2,000 kilometers (2,000,000 m) of paved road. There have been some recent investments; animal husbandry has expanded in Guayaramerín, which might be the result of a new road connecting Guayaramerín with Trinidad. The country only opened its first duplicated highway in 2015: a 203 km stretch between the capital La Paz and Oruro.

==== Air ====
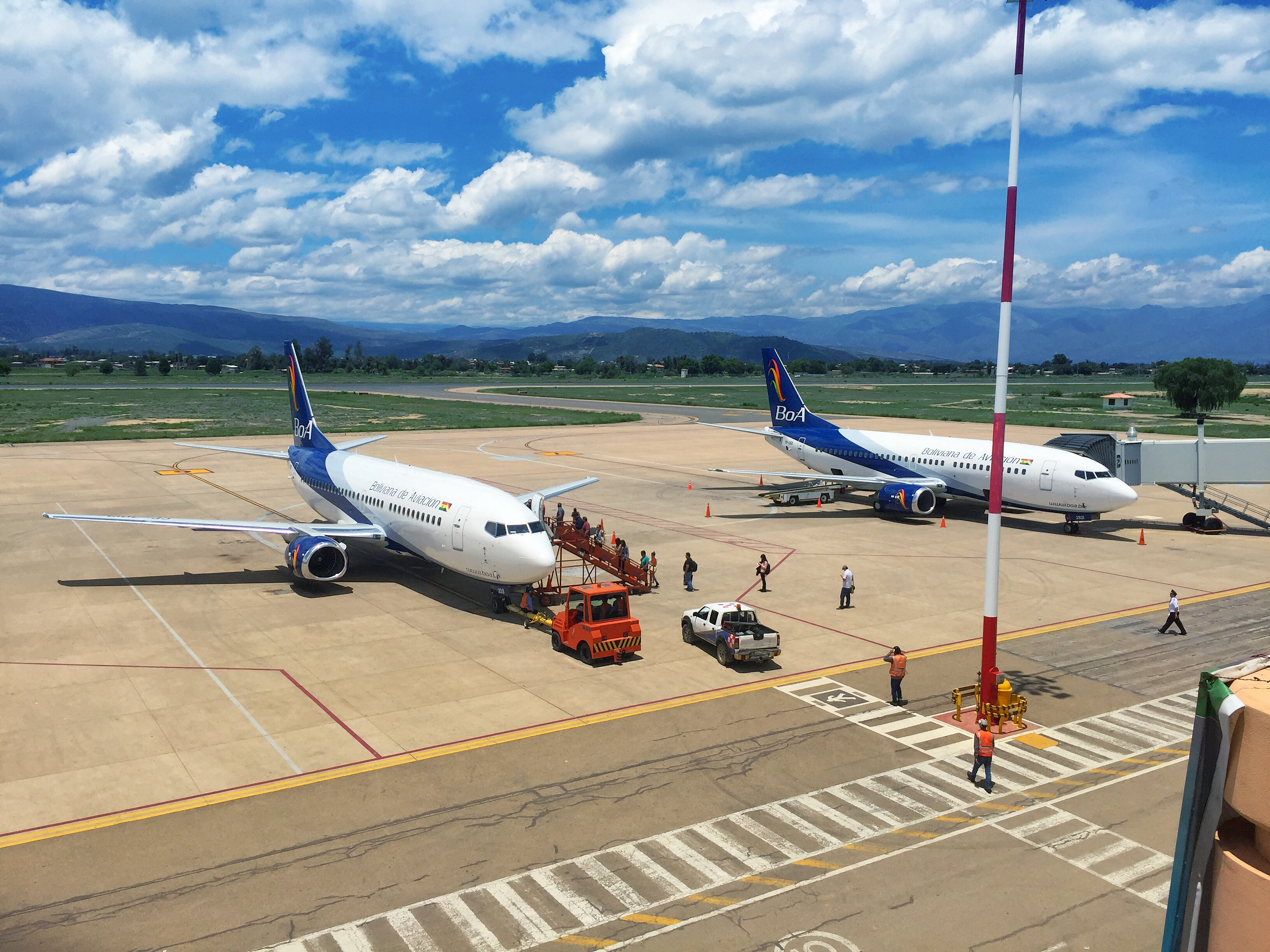
Boliviana de Aviación (BoA) is a state-owned company and the country's largest airline. Two BoA Boeing 737-300s parked at Jorge Wilstermann International Airport.

The General Directorate of Civil Aeronautics administers a civil aeronautics school called the National Institute of Civil Aeronautics and one commercial air transport service, Boliviana de Aviación is the flag carrier airline of Bolivia and is wholly owned by the government. A private airline serving regional destinations is Línea Aérea Amaszonas, with services including some international destinations. Transportes Aéreos Bolivianos provides civilian cargo flights to and from the United States.

International airports include El Alto International Airport in La Paz, Viru Viru International Airport in Santa Cruz, and Jorge Wilstermann International Airport in Cochabamba. There are regional airports in other cities that connect to these three hubs.

=== Technology ===
Bolivia owns a communications satellite which was offshored/outsourced and launched by China, named Túpac Katari 1. In 2015, it was announced that electrical power advancements include a planned $300 million nuclear reactor developed by the Russian nuclear company Rosatom. Bolivia was ranked 111th in the Global Innovation Index in 2025.

==== Water supply and sanitation ====
Bolivia's drinking water and sanitation coverage has greatly improved since 1990 due to a considerable increase in sectoral investment. However, the country has the continent's lowest coverage levels and services are of low quality. Political and institutional instability have contributed to the weakening of the sector's institutions at the national and local levels.

Concessions to foreign private companies in Cochabamba and La Paz/El Alto prematurely ended in the 2000s. Santa Cruz de la Sierra manages its own water and sanitation system relatively successfully by way of cooperatives. According to the government, the main issues in the sector are low access to sanitation, low access to water in rural areas, insufficient and ineffective investments, low visibility of community service providers, a lack of respect of indigenous customs, "technical and institutional difficulties in the design and implementation of projects," a lack of capacity to operate and maintain infrastructure, an institutional framework that is "not consistent with the political change in the country," "ambiguities in the social participation schemes," a reduction in the quantity and quality of water due to climate change, pollution and a lack of integrated water resources management, and the lack of policies and programs for the reuse of wastewater.

Only 27% of the population has access to improved sanitation, 80 to 88% has access to improved water sources. Coverage in urban areas is bigger than in rural ones.

== Demographics ==
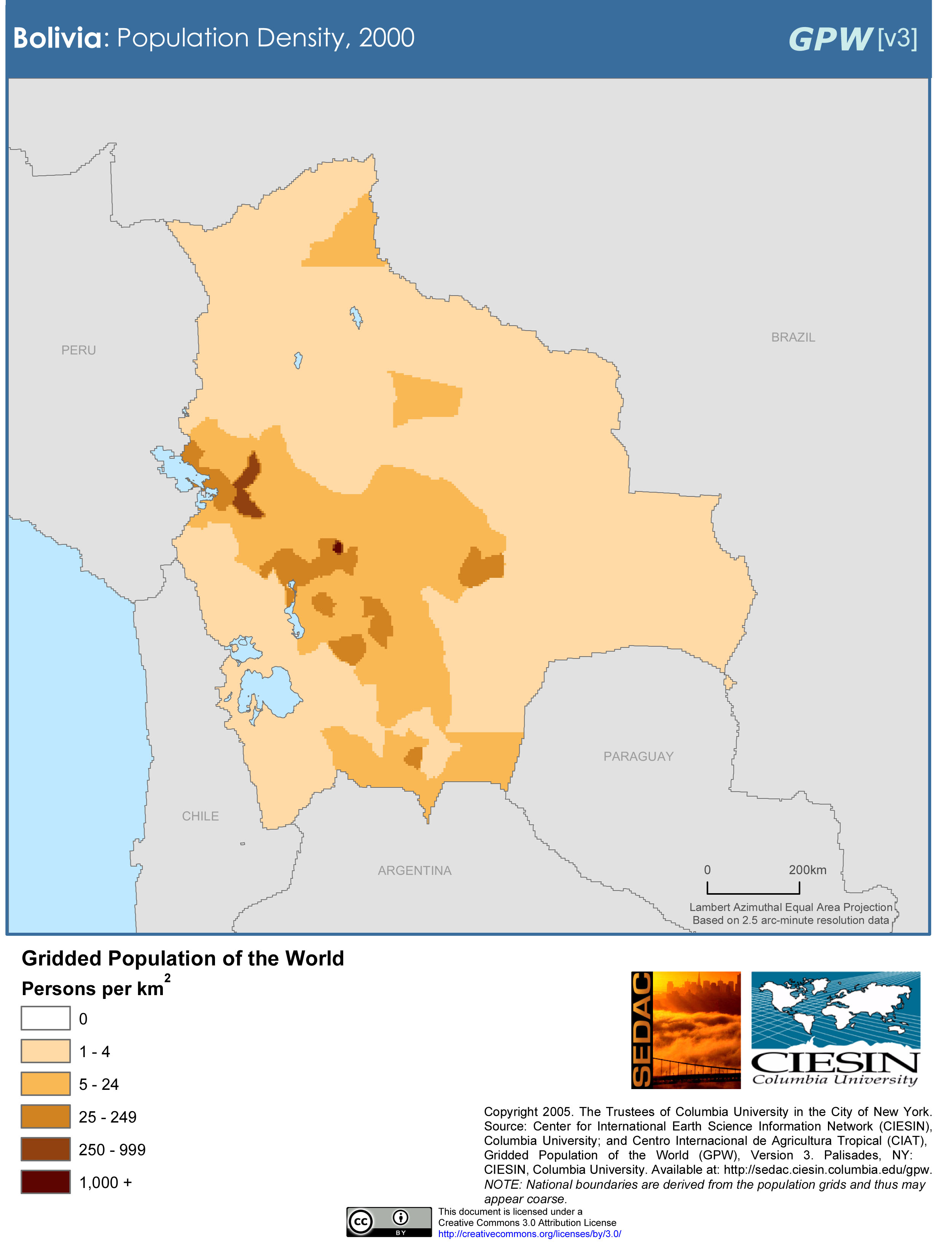
Population density (2000)

According to the last two censuses the population increased from 8,274,325 (from which 4,123,850 were men and 4,150,475 were women) in 2001 to 10,059,856 in 2012. In the last 50 years the population has tripled, reaching a population growth rate of 2.25%. 70% of the population is concentrated in the departments of La Paz, Santa Cruz and Cochabamba. In the Andean Altiplano region the departments of La Paz and Oruro hold the largest percentage of population; in the valley region the largest percentage is held by the departments of Cochabamba and Chuquisaca; while in the Llanos region by Santa Cruz and Beni. At national level, the population density is 8.49, with variations marked between 0.8 (Pando Department) and 26.2 (Cochabamba Department).

The largest population center is located in the so-called "central axis" and in the Llanos region. Bolivia has a young population. According to the 2011 census, 59% of the population is between 15 and 59 years old, 39% is less than 15 years old. Almost 60% of the population is younger than 25 years of age.

=== Largest cities and towns ===
Approximately 69% of Bolivians live in urban areas, among the lowest proportion in South America. Nevertheless, the rate of urbanization is growing steadily, at around 2.5% annually. According to the 2024 census, there are total of 4,125,627 households. In 2024, 84.7% of homes were classified as a house, hut, or pahuichi; 6.1% were apartments; 8.2% were a single room or detached room; 0.6% were in an improvised dwellings and 0.1% were a non-residential structure not originally intended for housing. Most of the largest cities are located in the highlands of the west and central regions.

Largest cities or towns in Bolivia Census 2024, INE
Rank	Name	Department	Pop.	Rank	Name	Department	Pop.
1	Santa Cruz de la Sierra	Santa Cruz	1,610,982	11	Warnes	Santa Cruz	151,248
2	El Alto	La Paz	885,825	12	La Guardia	Santa Cruz	147,726
3	La Paz	La Paz	757,431	13	Trinidad	Beni	128,589
4	Cochabamba	Cochabamba	665,505	14	Montero	Santa Cruz	126,886
5	Oruro	Oruro	298,350	15	Viacha	La Paz	113,554
6	Sucre	Chuquisaca	296,746	16	Riberalta	Beni	110,302
7	Tarija	Tarija	238,749	17	Yacuíba	Tarija	97,634
8	Sacaba	Cochabamba	219,092	18	Villa Tunari	Cochabamba	93,747
9	Potosí	Potosí	218,702	19	Tiquipaya	Cochabamba	61,840
10	Quillacollo	Cochabamba	166,741	20	Cobija	Pando	55,114

=== Ethnic groups ===
Racial groups in Bolivia (2012 census)
1. Undeclared (59.2%)
2. Indigenous (40.6%)
3. Blacks (0.23%)

The vast majority of Bolivians are mestizo (with the indigenous component higher than the European one), although the government has not included the cultural self-identification "mestizo" in the November 2012 census. There are approximately three dozen native groups totaling approximately half of the population – the largest proportion of indigenous people in the Americas. A 2009 estimate of racial classification put mestizo (mixed White and Amerindian) at 68%, indigenous at 20%, white at 5%, cholo at 2%, black at 1%, other at 4%, while 2% were unspecified; 44% attributed themselves to some indigenous group, predominantly the linguistic categories of Quechuas or Aymaras. White Bolivians comprised about 14% of the population in 2006. The ancestry of whites and the white ancestry of mestizos lies within Europe and the Middle East, most notably Spain, Italy, Germany, Croatia, Lebanon and Syria. In the Santa Cruz Department, there are several dozen colonies of German-speaking Mennonites from Russia totaling around 40,000 inhabitants (as of 2012). There are around 140,000 Mennonites in Bolivia of Frisian, Flemish and German ethnic origins.

Afro-Bolivians, descendants of African slaves who arrived in the time of the Spanish Empire, inhabit the department of La Paz and are located mainly in the provinces of Nor Yungas and Sud Yungas. Slavery was abolished in Bolivia in 1831. There are also important communities of Japanese (14,000) and Lebanese (12,900).

Indigenous peoples, also called "originarios" ("native" or "original") and less frequently, Amerindians, could be categorized by geographic area, such as Andean, like the Aymaras and Quechuas (who formed the ancient Inca Empire), who are concentrated in the western departments of La Paz, Potosí, Oruro, Cochabamba and Chuquisaca. There also are ethnic populations in the east, composed of the Chiquitano, Chané, Guaraní and Moxos, among others, who inhabit the departments of Santa Cruz, Beni, Tarija and Pando.

There are small numbers of European citizens from Germany, France, Italy and Portugal, as well as from other countries of the Americas, as Argentina, Brazil, Chile, Colombia, Cuba, Ecuador, the United States, Paraguay, Peru, Mexico and Venezuela, among others. There are important Peruvian colonies in La Paz, El Alto and Santa Cruz de la Sierra.

=== Language ===
Bolivia has great linguistic diversity as a result of its multiculturalism. The constitution recognizes 36 official languages besides Spanish. Spanish is the most spoken official language in the country, according to the 2001 census; as it is spoken by two-thirds of the population. All legal and official documents issued by the state, including the constitution, the main private and public institutions, the media, and commercial activities, are in Spanish. The main indigenous languages of the population above 4 years old are: Quechua (13.1% of the population in the 2024 census), Aymara (7.3%), Guarani (0.4%) and others (0.4%) including the Moxos in the department of Beni. Plautdietsch, a German dialect, is spoken by about 70,000 Mennonites in Santa Cruz. Portuguese is spoken mainly in the areas close to Brazil.

=== Religion ===
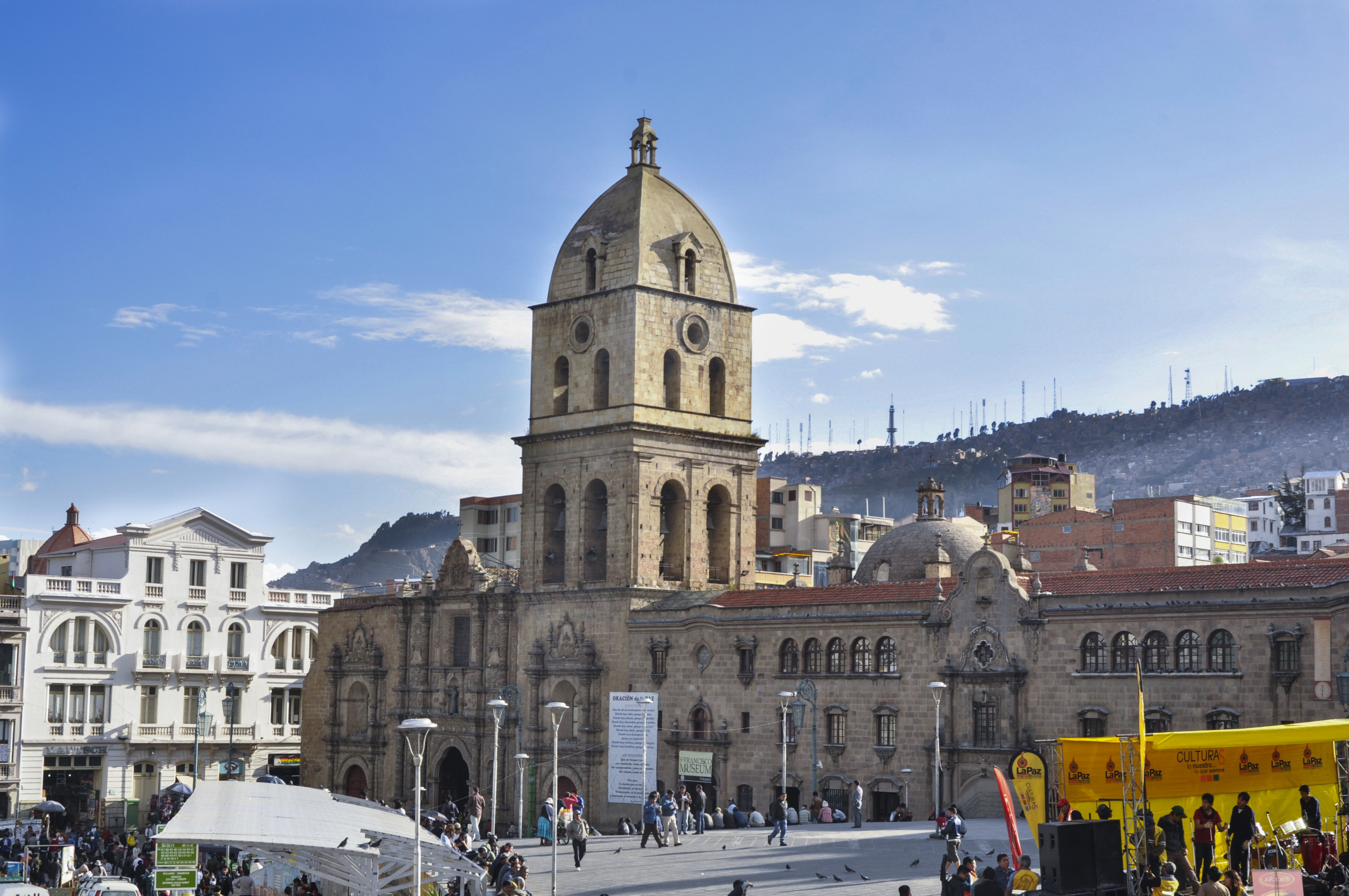
Basilica of San Francisco in La Paz

Bolivia is a constitutionally secular state that guarantees the freedom of religion and the independence of government from religion. According to the 2001 census, 78% of the population is Roman Catholic, followed by 19% that are Protestant, as well as a small number of Orthodox Christians, and 3% non-religious.

The Association of Religion Data Archives (relying on the World Christian Database) records that in 2010, 92.5% of Bolivians identified as Christian (of any denomination), 3.1% identified with indigenous religion, 2.2% identified as Baháʼí, 1.9% identified as agnostic, and all other groups constituted 0.1% or less.

Much of the indigenous population adheres to different traditional beliefs marked by inculturation or syncretism with Christianity. The cult of Pachamama, or "Mother Earth", is notable. The veneration of the Virgin of Copacabana, Virgin of Urkupiña and Virgin of Socavón, is also an important feature of Christian pilgrimage. There are important Aymaran communities near Lake Titicaca that have a strong devotion to James the Apostle. Deities worshiped in Bolivia include Ekeko, the Aymaran god of abundance and prosperity, whose day is celebrated every 24 January, and Tupá, a god of the Guaraní people.

=== Education ===
The Universidad Mayor Real y Pontificia San Francisco Xavier de Chuquisaca, Bolivia's oldest higher education institution

In 2008, following UNESCO standards, Bolivia was declared free of illiteracy. Public and private universities include: Universidad Mayor, Real y Pontificia de San Francisco Xavier de Chuquisaca, Sucre; Universidad Mayor de San Andrés, La Paz; Universidad Mayor de San Simon, Cochabamba; Universidad Autónoma Gabriel René Moreno, Santa Cruz de la Sierra; Universidad Técnica de Oruro, Oruro; Universidad Evangélica Boliviana, Santa Cruz de la Sierra; and Universidad Autónoma Tomás Frías, Potosi.

=== Health ===
According to UNICEF, the under-five mortality rate was 26 per 1,000 and the infant mortality rate was 21.1 per 1,000 in 2019. Before Morales took office, nearly half of all infants were not vaccinated; now nearly all are vaccinated. Morales also put into place several supplemental nutrition programs, including an effort to supply free food in public health and social security offices, and his desnutrición cero (zero malnutrition) program provides free school lunches.

Between 2006 and 2016, extreme poverty fell from 38.2% to 16.8%. Chronic malnutrition in children under five years of age also went down by 14%, and the child mortality rate was reduced by more than 50%, according to World Health Organization. In 2019 the government created a universal healthcare system which has been cited as a model for all by the World Health Organization.

=== Women's rights ===
Bolivia has one of the highest rates of femicide and gender-based violence in South America. In 2013, the Comprehensive Law to Guarantee Women a Life Free from Violence was passed, which codifies 16 types of gender-based violence and implements measures for prevention of violence, protection for victims, and the punishment of aggressors.

As of 2022, 46% of parliamentary seats are held by women. A 1997 law established quotas whereby candidates for public office fielded by political parties must be at least 30% women.

== Culture ==
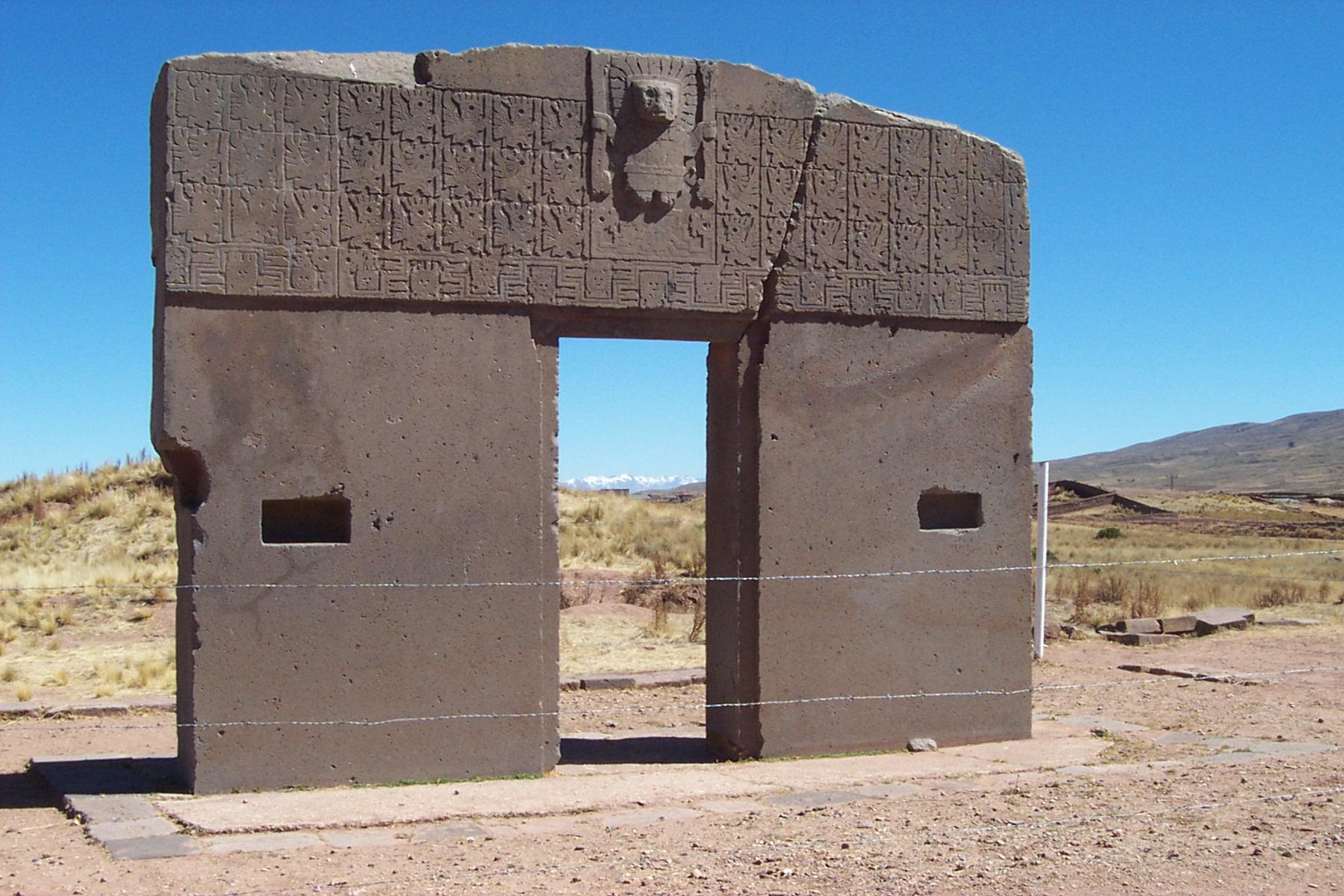
Gate of the Sun, 500–950 CE, Tiwanaku

Bolivian culture has been heavily influenced by the Spanish, the Aymara, and the Quechua, as well as the popular cultures of Latin America as a whole. The cultural development is divided into three distinct periods: precolumbian, colonial, and republican. Important archaeological ruins, gold and silver ornaments, stone monuments, ceramics, and weavings remain from several important pre-Columbian cultures. Major ruins include Tiwanaku, El Fuerte de Samaipata, Inkallaqta and Iskanwaya. The country abounds in other sites that are difficult to reach and have seen little archaeological exploration.

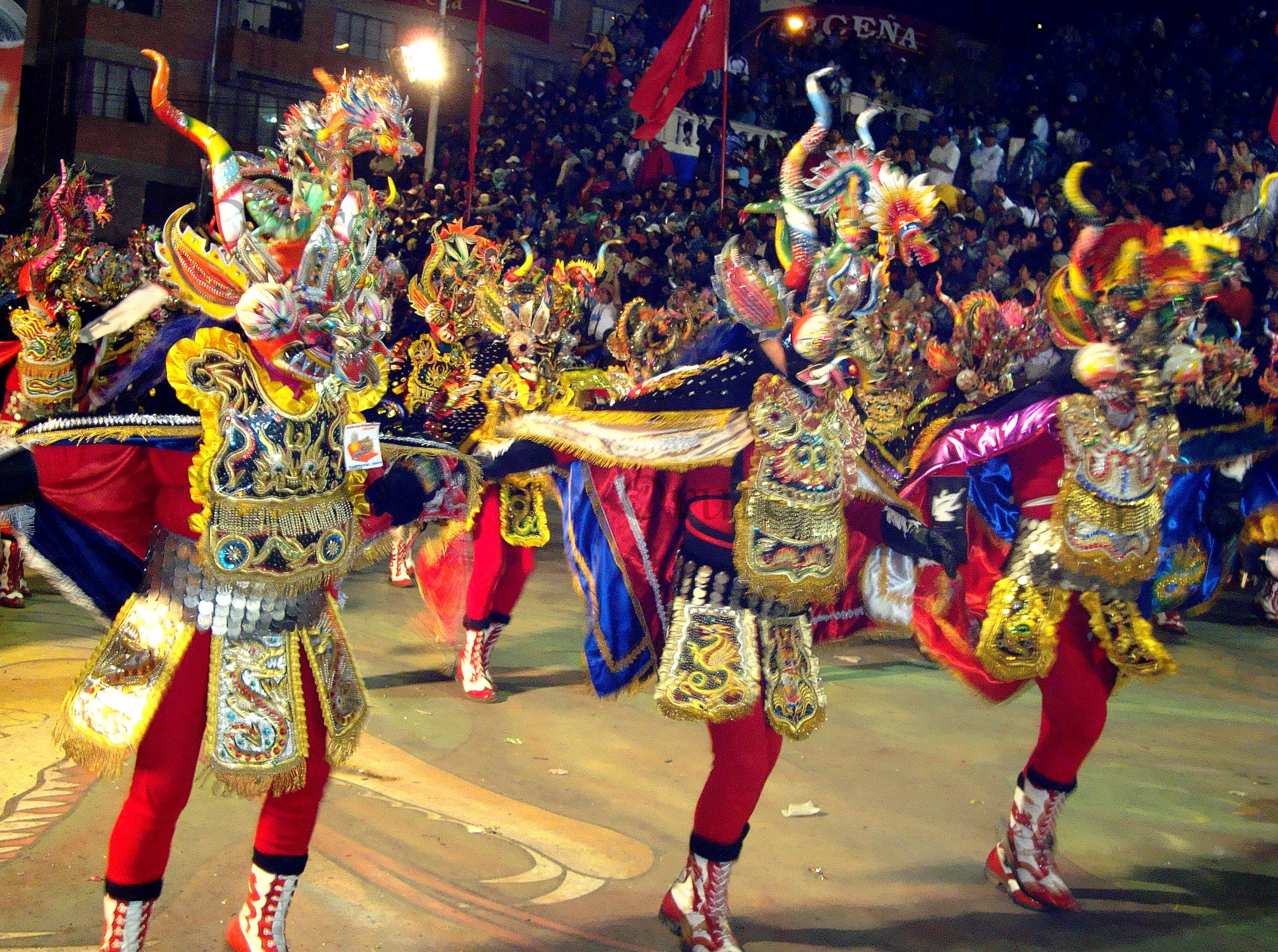
The Diablada, dance primeval, typical and main of Carnival of Oruro, a Masterpiece of the Oral and Intangible Heritage of Humanity since 2001

The Spanish brought their own tradition of religious art which, in the hands of local native, mestizo and some criollo builders and artisans, developed into a rich and distinctive style of architecture, painting, and sculpture known as Andean Baroque. The colonial period produced the paintings of Pérez de Holguín, Flores, Bitti, and others as well as the works of skilled but unknown stonecutters, woodcarvers, goldsmiths, and silversmiths. An important body of Native Baroque religious music of the colonial period was recovered and has been performed internationally to wide acclaim since 1994. Artists of 20th century include María Luisa Pacheco, Roberto Mamani Mamani, Alejandro Mario Yllanes, Alfredo Da Silva, and Marina Núñez del Prado.

Regional folk music is distinctive and varied. The "devil dances" at the annual carnival of Oruro are one of the great folkloric events of South America, as is the lesser known carnival at Tarabuco.

=== Media ===
The World Press Freedom Index described violent attacks against journalists and censorship in Bolivia.

=== Sports ===
Football is popular. The national team is the Bolivia national football team. Racquetball is the second most popular sport in Bolivia as for the results in the Odesur 2018 Games held in Cochabamba. Bolivia has won 18 medals at the Pan American Games and 15 of them came from racquetball events, including their only gold medals, won in the Men's Team event in 2019 and 2023, plus a Men's Singles Gold in 2023 by world champion Conrrado Moscoso. Basketball is especially popular and influential in the Potosí Department.

== See also ==
- Outline of Bolivia

== Bibliography ==
- Crabtree, John, and Laurence Whitehead, eds. Unresolved tensions: Bolivia past and present (2008) excerpt Archived 25 April 2022 at the Wayback Machine
- Klein, Herbert S. A Concise History of Bolivia (Cambridge UP, 2021) excerpt Archived 9 July 2023 at the Wayback Machine
- Morales, Waltraud Q. A brief history of Bolivia (Infobase Publishing, 2010).
- Rohan, Rebecca. Bolivia (Cavendish Square, 2021) 32pp; for middle schools.
- Thomson, Sinclair, et al., eds. The Bolivia Reader: History, Culture, Politics (Duke University Press, 2018).
- Young, Kevin A. Blood of the earth: resource nationalism, revolution, and empire in Bolivia (University of Texas Press, 2017).
- Constitute Assembly of Bolivia (2007). "Nueva Constitucion Politica del Estatdo" [New State Constitution] (PDF) (in Spanish). Government of Bolivia. Archived from the original (PDF) on 3 March 2009.
- Fagan, Brian (2001). The Seventy Great Mysteries of the Ancient World: Unlocking the Secrets of Past Civilizations. Thames & Hudson. ISBN 978-0-500-51050-6.
- Kolata, Alan (1993). The Tiwanaku: Portrait of an Andean Civilization. Wiley. ISBN 978-1-55786-183-2.
- Kolata, Alan (1996). Valley of the Spirits: A Journey into the Lost Realm of the Aymara. Wiley. ISBN 978-0-47157-507-8.
- Eisenberg, Daniel (1987). "Bolivia" (PDF). Journal of Hispanic Philology. 11: 193–198. Archived from the original (PDF) on 17 March 2024.

Attribution:

- This article incorporates text from this source, which is in the public domain: Hudson, Rex A.; Hanratty, Dennis Michael, eds. (1991). Bolivia: a country study. Washington, D.C.: Federal Research Division, Library of Congress. Archived from the original on 25 April 2022.
