= Bermejo =

Bermejo (meaning "russet" or "auburn" in Spanish) may refer to:

== Geographic Locations ==
- Bermejo Department, Chaco, Argentina
- Bermejo Department, Formosa, Argentina
- Bermejo Pass, an alternate name for Uspallata Pass, Argentina
- Bermejo River, a tributary of the Paraguay River, South America
- Bermejo, Tarija Department, Bolivia
  - Bermejo Airport
- Concepción del Bermejo, Chaco, Argentina
- Isla Bermejo, Argentina
- Mar Bermejo, an alternate name in Spanish for the Gulf of California
- Puerto Bermejo, Chaco, Argentina

== Persons ==
- Álex Bermejo (born 1998), Spanish football player
- Alvaro Bermejo (born 1959), Spanish writer and journalist
- Bartolomé Bermejo (c. 1440 – c. 1498), Spanish artist
- David Bermejo (born 1972), Spanish director
- Francisco Javier Bermejo (born 1955), Spanish football player
- Guillermo Bermejo (born 1975), Peruvian politician
- Javier Bermejo (born 1978), Spanish athlete
- Jesús Ángel Solana Bermejo (born 1964), Spanish footballer and coach
- José Bermejo López (1894–1971), Spanish military officer and colonial administrator
- Juan José Arévalo Bermejo (1904–1990), President of Guatemala
- Lee Bermejo, American illustrator
- Luis Bermejo (illustrator), (1931–2015), Spanish illustrator
- Magdalena Bermejo (born c. 1962), Spanish primatologist
- Manuel Bermejo Hernández (1936–2009), Spanish politician
- Mariano Fernández Bermejo (born 1948), Spanish jurist and politician
- Mario Bermejo (born 1978), Spanish footballer
- Ricardo Bermejo (1900–1957), Chilean cyclist
- Segismundo Bermejo y Merelo (1832–1899), Spanish Minister of the Navy
- Sergio Bermejo (born 1997), Spanish football player
