= List of cities and largest towns in Bolivia =

Bolivian cities by population: #1–10

According to the National Institute of Statistics of Bolivia (INE), a city is classified as an area where the city limits are identifiable, and its local government is recognized. Bolivia has 1,384 cities. As of 21 November 2012, the date of the most-recent national census, 53 cities have a population of at least 10,000 in Bolivia, as enumerated by the INE. These 53 cities have a population of 6,162,346, accounting for 61.4% of the country's population. The largest city is Santa Cruz de la Sierra, with a population of 1,441,406, a 29.4% increase from the last census date of 5 September 2001. La Guardia had the highest percentage increase, 801.5%, from 2001 to 2012.

From 2001 to 2012, Bolivia had a population increase of 21.1%. Of the 53 cities, 42 had a higher increase than 21.1%, 8 had lower increase and 3 had a small decrease. The three cities that had a negative population growth from 2001 to 2012 are La Paz (−4.1%), Yacuíba (−4.2%), and Santa Ana del Yacuma (−5.4%). With the exception of the Department of La Paz, each department's capital city is the largest city in its respective department. The Department of Santa Cruz has the most cities (18), and Pando and Chuquisaca have the least (1).

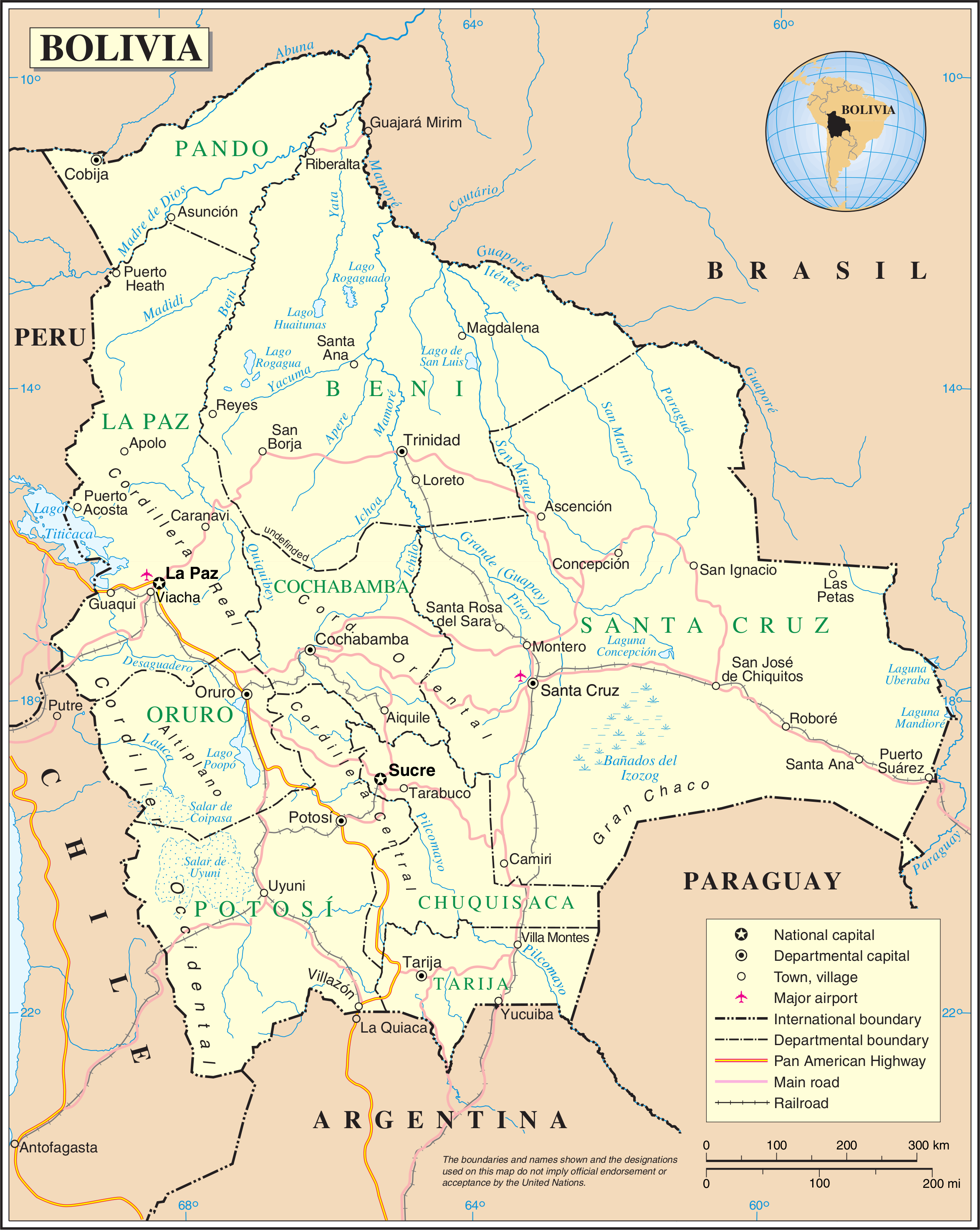
An enlargeable map of the Plurinational State of Bolivia

== List ==
Top five cities by population

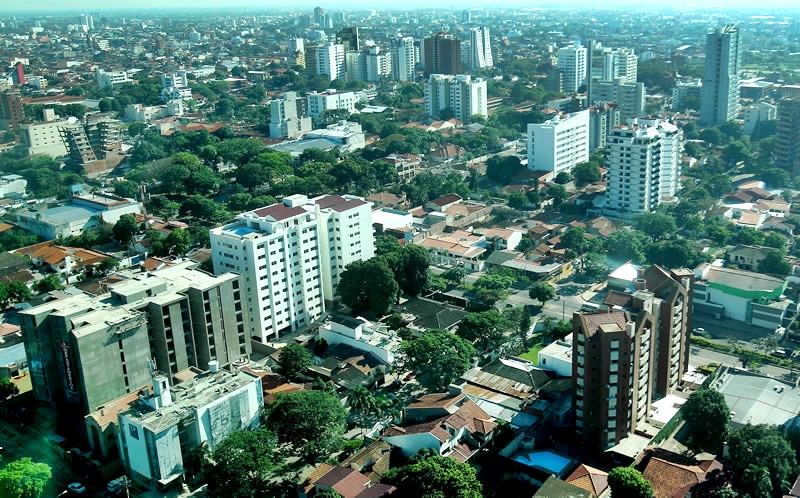
1. Santa Cruz de la Sierra

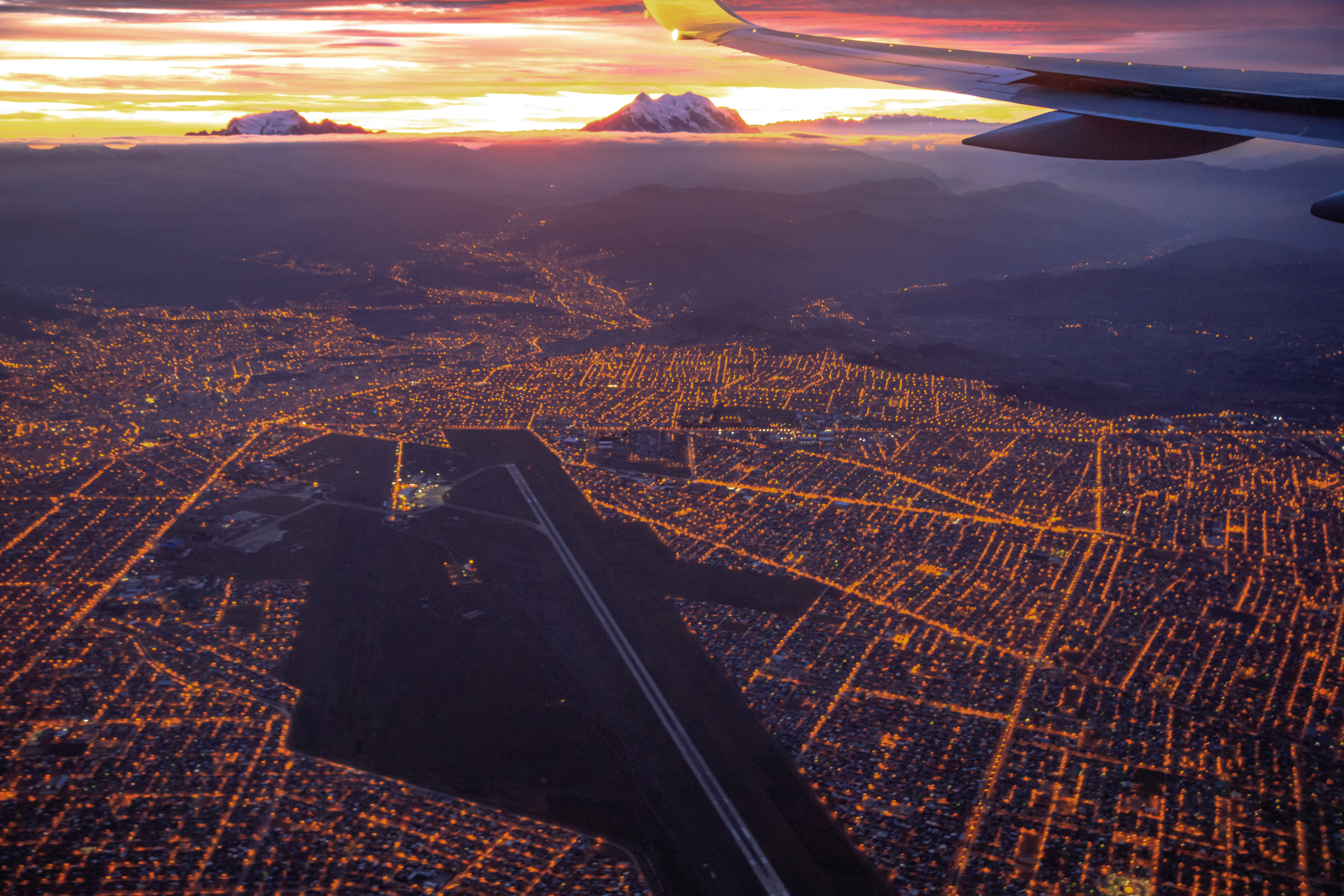
2. El Alto

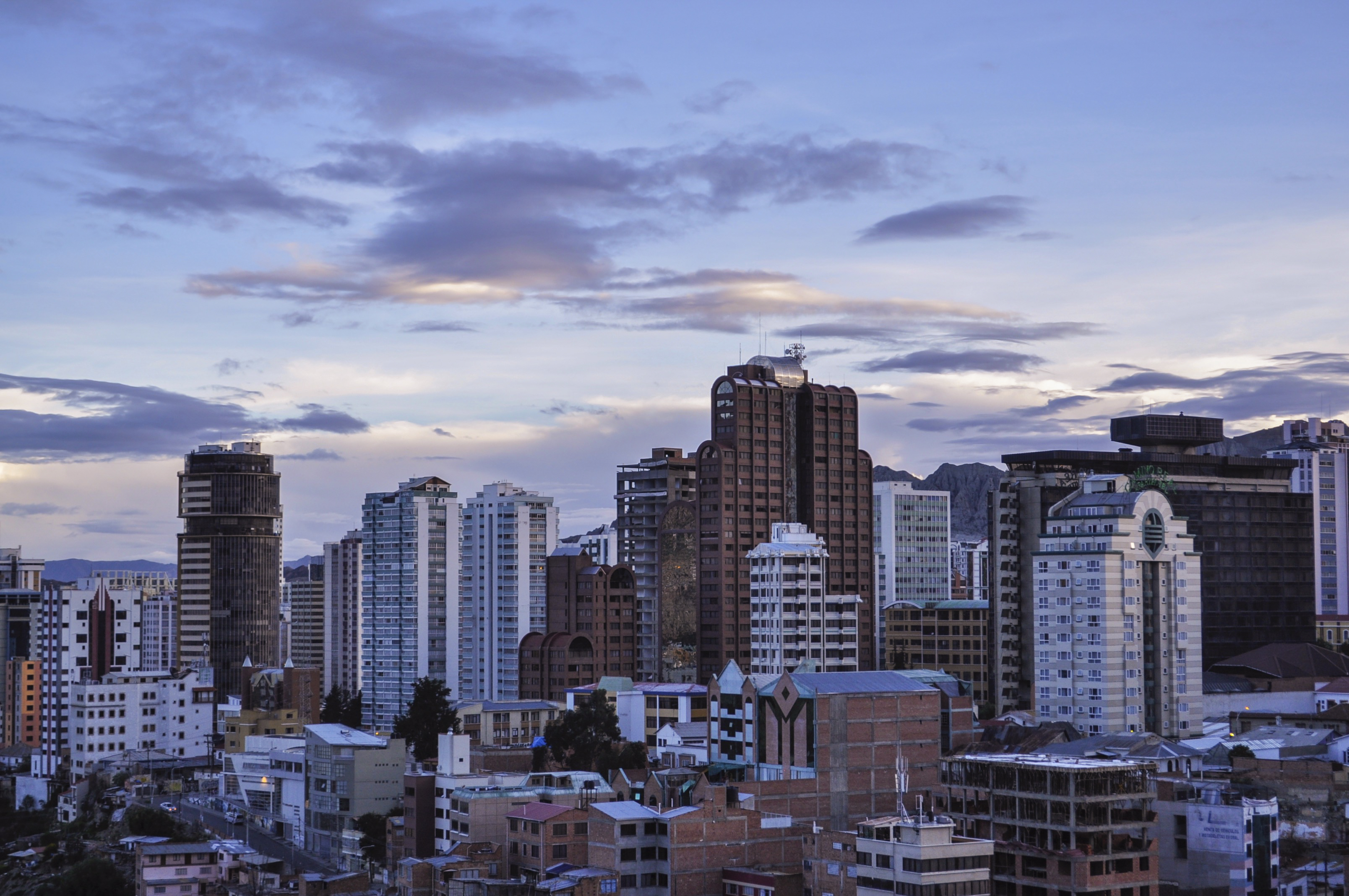
3. La Paz

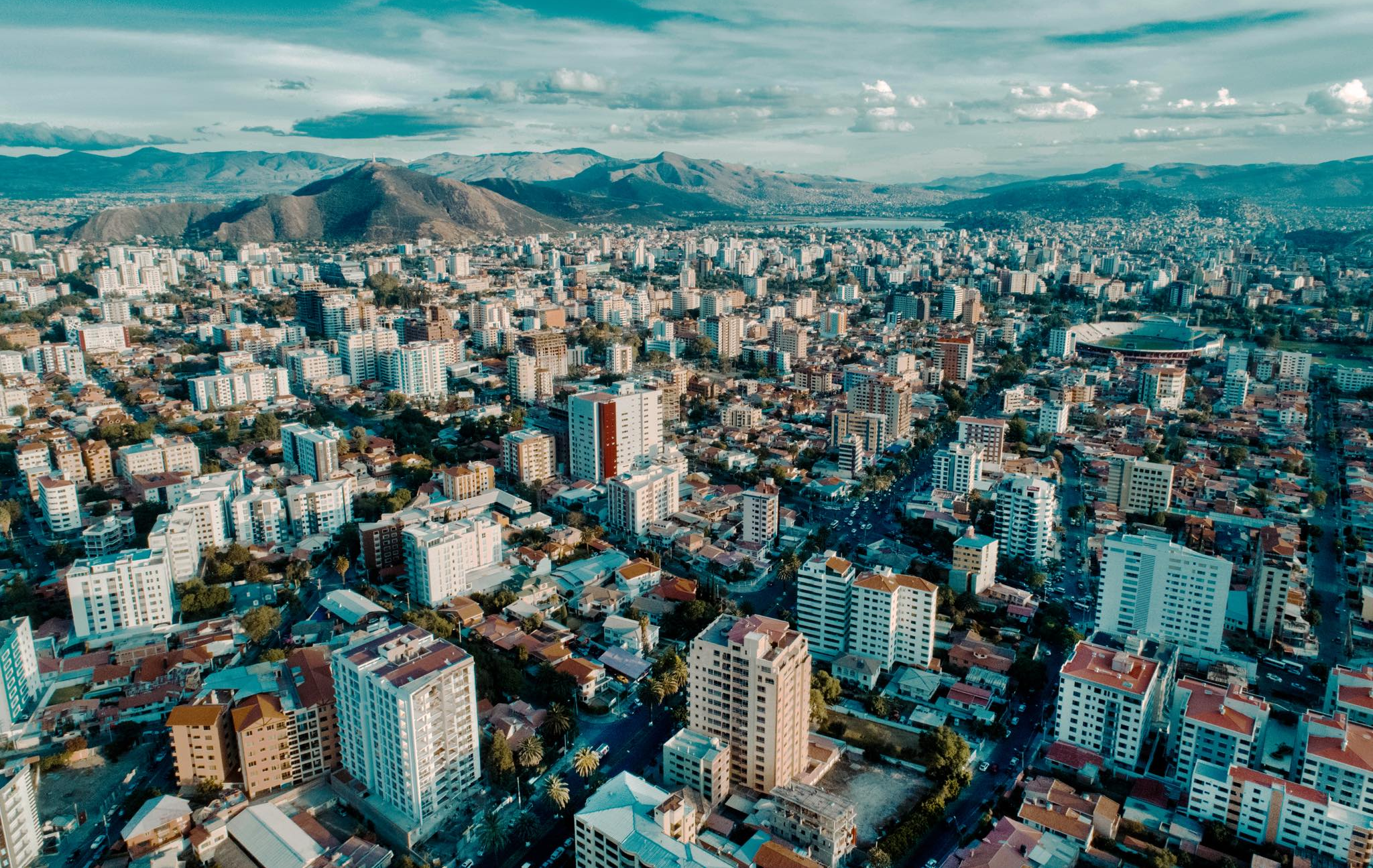
4. Cochabamba

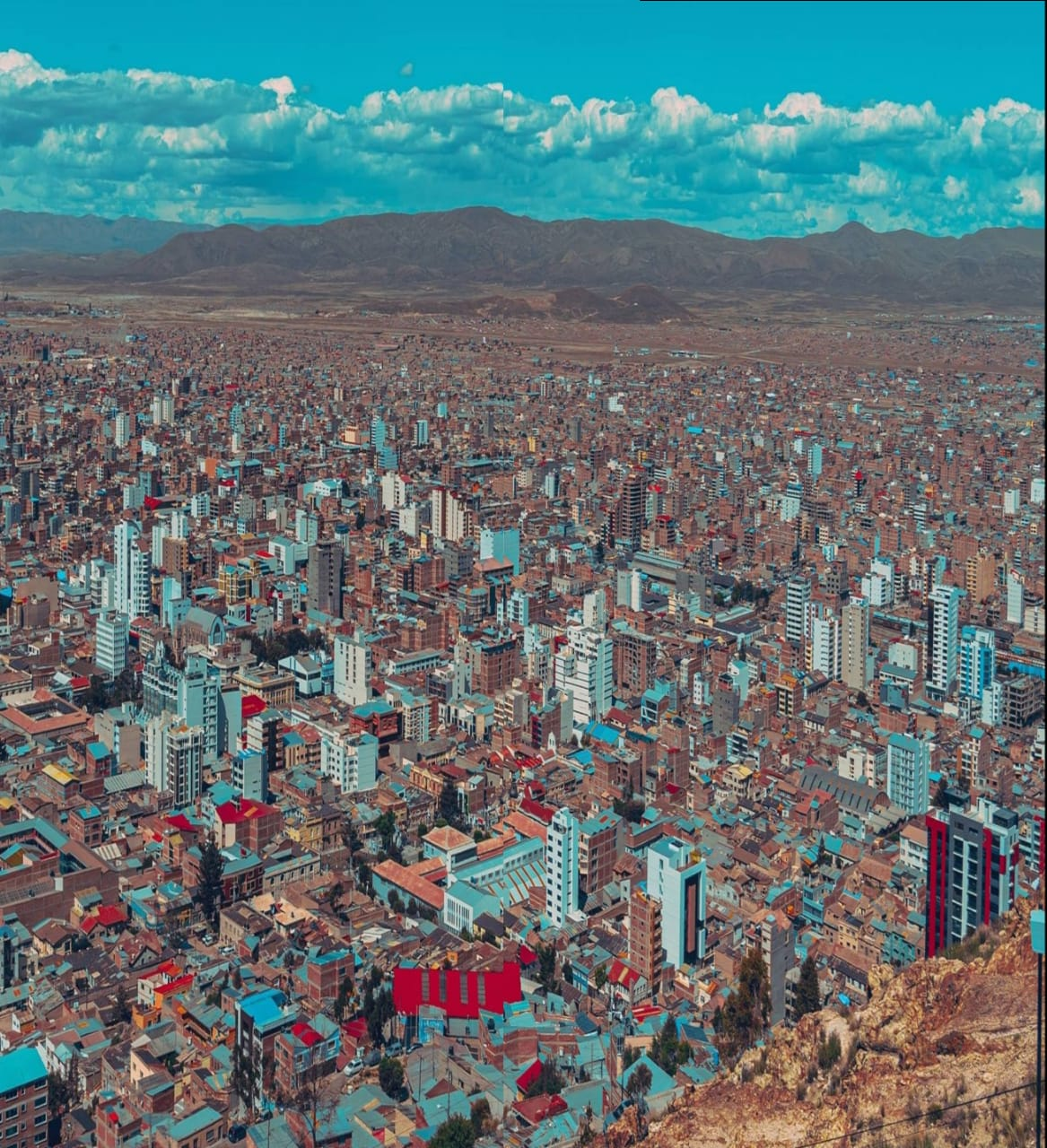
5. Oruro

Key
*	= Department capital
†	= Largest city in department

Rank	City	Department	2012 Census	2001 Census	Net change
1	Santa Cruz de la Sierra*†	Santa Cruz	1,441,406	1,113,582	+29.4%
2	El Alto†	La Paz	842,378	647,350	+30.1%
3	La Paz*	La Paz	757,184	789,585	−4.1%
4	Cochabamba*†	Cochabamba	630,587	516,683	+22.0%
5	Oruro*†	Oruro	264,683	201,332	+31.5%
6	Sucre*†	Chuquisaca	237,480	193,876	+22.5%
7	Tarija*†	Tarija	179,528	135,783	+32.2%
8	Potosí*†	Potosí	174,973	132,966	+31.6%
9	Sacaba	Cochabamba	149,570	92,581	+61.6%
10	Quillacollo	Cochabamba	117,859	74,980	+57.2%
11	Montero	Santa Cruz	107,294	78,294	+37.0%
12	Trinidad*†	Beni	101,454	75,540	+34.3%
13	Riberalta	Beni	78,754	64,511	+22.1%
14	Warnes	Santa Cruz	77,668	17,872	+334.6%
15	La Guardia	Santa Cruz	77,278	8,572	+801.5%
16	Viacha	La Paz	62,516	29,108	+114.8%
17	Yacuiba	Tarija	61,844	64,611	−4.3%
18	Colcapirhua	Cochabamba	51,896	41,980	+23.6%
19	Tiquipaya	Cochabamba	49,237	26,732	+84.2%
20	Cobija*†	Pando	42,849	20,820	+105.8%
21	Vinto	Cochabamba	40,920	14,180	+188.6%
22	Guayaramerín	Beni	35,764	33,095	+8.1%
23	Villazón	Potosí	35,167	28,045	+25.4%
24	Yapacaní^{[A]}	Santa Cruz	32,017	16,572	+93.2%
25	Villamontes	Tarija	30,228	16,113	+87.6%
26	Bermejo	Tarija	29,459	26,059	+13.0%
27	Camiri	Santa Cruz	28,855	26,505	+8.9%
28	Tupiza	Potosí	27,302	21,707	+25.8%
29	Llallagua	Potosí	25,166	20,065	+25.4%
30	San Ignacio de Velasco	Santa Cruz	23,126	19,401	+19.2%
31	San Julián	Santa Cruz	20,687	6,798	+204.3%
32	Huanuni	Oruro	20,336	15,106	+34.6%
33	Punata	Cochabamba	19,559	14,742	+32.7%
34	Cotoca	Santa Cruz	19,482	15,181	+28.3%
35	Ascensión de Guarayos	Santa Cruz	19,254	13,630	+41.3%
36	Achocalla	La Paz	18,442	10,369	+77.9%
37	Mineros	Santa Cruz	18,340	13,282	+38.1%
38	Uyuni	Potosí	18,068	10,551	+71.2%
39	San Borja	Beni	17,520	16,273	+7.7%
40	El Torno	Santa Cruz	17,130	11,879	+44.2%
41	Puerto Suárez	Santa Cruz	16,643	11,594	+43.5%
42	Portachuelo	Santa Cruz	14,091	11,338	+24.3%
43	Caranavi	La Paz	13,766	12,083	+13.9%
44	Rurrenabaque	Beni	13,446	8,479	+58.6%
45	Challapata	Oruro	12,684	9,452	+34.2%
46	Santa Ana del Yacuma	Beni	12,178	12,877	−5.4%
47	San José de Chiquitos	Santa Cruz	11,874	9,322	+27.4%
48	Sipe Sipe	Cochabamba	11,826	3,226	+266.6%
49	Patacamaya	La Paz	11,197	8,414	+33.1%
50	Puerto Quijarro	Santa Cruz	11,071	8,963	+23.5%
51	Vallegrande	Santa Cruz	10,158	7,884	+28.8%
52	Roboré	Santa Cruz	10,098	10,078	+0.2%
53	San Ignacio de Moxos	Beni	10,054	9,590	+4.8%

== Notes ==
- A In 2001, Yapacaní did not exist. The INE consolidated 19 cities, which had a 2001 population of 16,572, for the 2012 census to form Yapacaní.
