= List of Bolivian flags =

Flags of Bolivia

This is a list of flags used in or otherwise associated with Bolivia. For more information on the national flag, see Flag of Bolivia.

== National flag ==
Flag	Date	Use	Description
	1851–present	National flag	A horizontal tricolor of red, yellow, and green.
	1851–present	State flag	A horizontal tricolor of red, yellow, and green with the coat of arms centered in the yellow band.
	2009–present	Second national flag	Banner composed of a 7-by-7 square patchwork in seven colours, arranged diagonally.
	1851–present	Flag of Bolivia (vertical)	

=== Unofficial third national flag ===
Flag	Date	Use	Description
	2013–present	Flag of the patujú flower	An inflorescence of Bolivia's national flower, Heliconia rostrata, on a white field.
	2018–present	Flag of the patujú flower (variant)	An inflorescence of Bolivia's national flower, Heliconia rostrata, on a white field with a green border.

== Military flags ==
Flag	Date	Use	Description
	1851–present	Flag of the Bolivian Army	A horizontal tricolor of red, yellow, and green with the coat of arms with a laurel centered in the yellow band.
	1966–2013	Former Naval ensign of the Bolivian Navy	A blue field with the Bolivian tricolor in the canton, nine golden five-pointed stars surrounding the flag and defaced with a large golden five-pointed star.
	2013–present	Naval ensign of the Bolivian Navy	A blue field with the Bolivian tricolor and the wiphala in the canton, nine golden five-pointed stars surrounding the flags and defaced with a large golden five-pointed star.
	1851–present	Naval jack of the Bolivian Navy	A green field with a double border of yellow and red.

== Indigenous flags ==
Flag	Date	Use	Description
	2000–present	Flag of the Chiquitana-Guarayan Nation	A quartered field of red and green with six white four-pointed stars and a small golden cross in the center.
	2015–present	Flag of the Guaraní Nation	A horizontal tricolor of blue, green, and brown with the Guaraní emblem in the center.

== Political flags ==
Flag	Date	Use	Description
	1979–present	Flag of Nationalist Democratic Action	A horizontal tricolor of red, white, and black.
	1954–present	Flag of the Christian Democratic Party	A vertical tricolor of red, white, and green.
	2001–present	Flag of the Chiquitanian Indigenous Organization	A horizontal tricolor of green, yellow, and blue with the emblem in the center of the yellow band and the organization name in both the green and blue bands.
	2018–present	Flag of Civic Community	A horizontal bicolor of orange and green.
	1957–present	Flag of the Santa Cruz Youth Union	A green field with the emblem in the center.
	1978–present	Flag of the FRI	A horizontal bicolor of red and blue.
	1997–present	Flag of MAS	A blue field with two black and white stripes on both sides.

== Department flags ==
Flag	Date	Use	Description
	1866–1871	Flag of the Department of Tarata	A red field with a golden sun in the center.
	1987–present	Flag of Beni	A green field with eight golden five-pointed stars.
	1867–1904	Flag of Litoral (Atacama)	A horizontal tricolor of blue, red, and yellow.
	1945–present	Flag of Chuquisaca	The Burgundy Cross with a crown in the center.
	1826–present	Flag of Cochabamba	A simple cyan field.
	1826–present	Flag of La Paz	A horizontal bicolor of red and green.
	1826–present	Flag of Oruro	A simple red field.
	1938–present	Flag of Pando	A horizontal bicolor of white and green.
	1940–present	Flag of Potosí	Similar to the Flag of Castile and León.
	1864–present	Flag of Santa Cruz	A horizontal triband of green, white, and green.
	1831–present	Flag of Tarija	A horizontal bicolor of red and white.

== Province and municipality flags ==
Flag	Date	Use	Description
	1851–present	Flag of Santa Ana del Yacuma	A horizontal tricolor of green, white, and blue with six golden five-pointed stars encircling the center.
	1948–present	Flag of Ángel Sandoval	A horizontal tricolor of green, red, and blue with five golden five-pointed stars in the central stripe.
	1832–present	Flag of Burdett O'Connor	A horizontal bicolor of blue and white.
	1937–present	Flag of José Ballivián	A white field with a golden crown in the center and four five-pointed stars below.
	1856–present	Flag of Cercado	A simple green field.
	1876–present	Flag of Gran Chaco, Manuel María Caballero and Chapare	A horizontal bicolor of green and white.
	1851–present	Flag of Iténez	A vertical triband of yellow, green, and yellow with six five-pointed yellow stars in the central band.
	1851–present	Flag of Mamoré	Two equal horizontal bands of green (top) and blue with a purple isosceles triangle based on the hoist side and three golden five-pointed stars near the vertex of the three colors.
	1851–present	Flag of Marbán	A green field with a white band at the fly and a golden cross in the center of the white band.
	1851–present	Flag of Moxos	A horizontal tricolor of yellow, red, and green.
	1851–present	Flag of Vaca Díez	A horizontal tricolor of pink, red, and green.
	1851–present	Flag of Yacuma	A horizontal triband of blue, white, and blue.
	1851–present	Flag of Quillacollo	A horizontal tricolor of blue, white, and black.
	1851–present	Flag of San Lorenzo	A horizontal bicolor of red and blue.
	1851–present	Flag of Aniceto Arce, Padcaya and Tapacarí	A horizontal tricolor of red, white, and green.
	1851–present	Flag of Samaipata and Florida	A horizontal bicolor of white and green.
	1851–present	Flag of Carangas	
	1851–present	Flag of Tiraque	A horizontal tricolor of green, white, and cyan.
	1851–present	Flag of Germán Busch	A horizontal tricolor of green, white, and red.
	1851–present	Flag of Guarayos	A horizontal tricolor of yellow, white, and green.
	1851–present	Flag of Ichilo and Ñuflo de Chávez	A horizontal triband of green, yellow, and green.
	1851–present	Flag of Warnes and Ignacio Warnes	A horizontal triband of white, green, and white.
	1851–present	Flag of San Ignacio de Velasco	A horizontal tricolor of green, yellow, and blue.
	1851–present	Flag of Vallegrande	A horizontal triband of blue, white, and blue with an arc of five golden five-pointed stars in the central band.
	1851–present	Flag of Andrés Ibáñez	A horizontal triband of green, white, and green.
	1851–present	Flag of Chiquitos	A horizontal bicolor of red and white.
	1851–present	Flag of Cordillera	A horizontal tricolor of green, yellow, and blue with seven golden five-pointed stars in a U-shaped arc from the upper hoist to the upper fly.
	1851–present	Flag of Obispo Santistevan	A horizontal triband of green, white, and green with a red triangle based on the hoist side and five golden five-pointed stars inside the triangle.
	1851–present	Flag of Sara	A diagonal bicolor of green and white with a red cross and two golden five-pointed stars in the upper fly triangle.
	1851–present	Flag of Ayopaya	A horizontal bicolor of white and red.
	1851–present	Flag of Narciso Campero	A horizontal bicolor of black and white.

== Proposed flag ==
Flag	Date	Use	Description
	2006	Flag of Bolivia	A combination of the national tricolor and the Wiphala.

== Historical flags ==
Flag	Date	Use	Description
	1519–1785	Flag of the Spanish Empire	A red saltire resembling two crossed, roughly-pruned (knotted) branches, on a white field.
	1785–1814	Flag of the Kingdom of Spain	A horizontal triband flag of red, yellow (double width), and red; charged with the Spanish coat of arms off-centered toward the hoist.
	1812	Flag of Manuel Belgrano	A horizontal bicolor of white and light blue.
	1812–1818	The flag of Macha (Officially adopted in 1816)	A triband of light blue, white, and light blue.
	1818–1819; 1820–1825	Flag of the United Provinces	A triband of light blue, white, and light blue with the Sun of May in the center of the white band.
	1819–1820	Flag of the United Provinces	A triband of blue, white, and blue with the Sun of May in the center of the white band.
	1821–1822	Flag of the Protectorate of Peru	A diagonal quartered red and white field with the coat of arms in the center.
	1825–1826	Flag of Bolivia	A vertical triband of green, red (extra wide), and green with a golden five-pointed star decorated with a laurel in the center of the red band.
	1825–1826	State flag of Bolivia	A vertical triband of green, red (extra wide), and green with five golden five-pointed stars decorated with laurels in the center of the red band.
	1826–1831	Flag of Bolivia	A vertical triband of green, red (extra wide), and green with a horizontal yellow band across the top.
	1826–1831	State flag of Bolivia	A vertical triband of green, red (extra wide), and green with a horizontal yellow band across the top and the coat of arms in the center.
	1831–1851	Flag of Bolivia	A horizontal tricolor of yellow, red (extra wide), and green.
	1831–1851	State flag of Bolivia	A horizontal tricolor of yellow, red (extra wide), and green with the coat of arms in the center of the red band.
	1836–1839	Flag of the Peru–Bolivian Confederation	A red field with the arms of the three states of the confederation on a laurel.

== See also ==
- Flag of Bolivia
- Coat of arms of Bolivia
