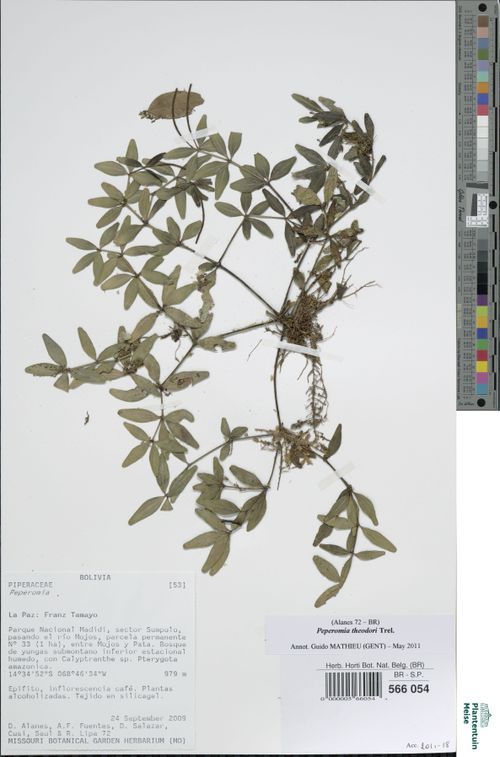

Scientific classification
- Kingdom: Plantae
- Clade: Tracheophytes
- Clade: Angiosperms
- Clade: Magnoliids
- Order: Piperales
- Family: Piperaceae
- Genus: Peperomia
- Species: P. theodori

Binomial name
- Peperomia theodori Trel.

Synonyms
- Peperomia reflexa f. longilimba C.DC Peperomia theodori var. glabricaulis Yunck.

= Peperomia theodori =

Species of epiphyte

Peperomia theodori is a species of epiphyte from the genus Peperomia. It was first described by William Trelease and published in the book "Lilloa 5: 356. 1940 ". It primarily grows on subtropical biome.

== Distribution ==
It is endemic to Southern America.

- Argentina
  - Jujuy
    - Ledesma
    - Santa Bárbara
  - Salta
    - Santa Victoria
    - General José de San Martín
    - Orán
  - Tucumán
    - Tafí
    - Lules
- Bolivia
  - Chuquisaca
    - Hernando Siles
    - Sud Cinti
    - Luis Calvo
  - Tarija
    - Aniceto Arce
    - Burdett O'Connor
  - Santa Cruz
    - Cordillera
    - Florida
  - Oruro
  - La Paz
  - Cochabamba
- Brazil
  - Bahia
