= Palmar Grande, Tarija =

Palmar Grande
- Town
- Location within Bolivia
- Coordinates: 21°33′S 63°27′W
- Country: Bolivia
- Department: Tarija Department
- Province: Gran Chaco Province
- Municipality: Villamontes Municipality
- Elevation: 1,570 ft (480 m)

Population (2012)
  - Total: 256
- Time zone: UTC-4 (BOT)

Palmar Grande is a town in the Tarija Department of Bolivia.

== Climate ==
Climate data for Palmar Grande, elevation 460 m (1,510 ft), (1978–2015)
Month	Jan	Feb	Mar	Apr	May	Jun	Jul	Aug	Sep	Oct	Nov	Dec	Year
Mean daily maximum °C (°F)	33.8 (92.8)	32.5 (90.5)	31.4 (88.5)	28.2 (82.8)	25.0 (77.0)	24.4 (75.9)	25.3 (77.5)	28.0 (82.4)	30.8 (87.4)	33.5 (92.3)	33.1 (91.6)	33.5 (92.3)	30.0 (85.9)
Daily mean °C (°F)	27.1 (80.8)	26.2 (79.2)	25.3 (77.5)	22.4 (72.3)	19.1 (66.4)	18.0 (64.4)	17.6 (63.7)	19.6 (67.3)	22.5 (72.5)	25.8 (78.4)	26.2 (79.2)	26.8 (80.2)	23.0 (73.5)
Mean daily minimum °C (°F)	20.4 (68.7)	19.8 (67.6)	19.1 (66.4)	16.7 (62.1)	13.2 (55.8)	11.7 (53.1)	9.9 (49.8)	11.1 (52.0)	14.3 (57.7)	17.9 (64.2)	19.1 (66.4)	20.1 (68.2)	16.1 (61.0)
Average precipitation mm (inches)	131.3 (5.17)	148.8 (5.86)	115.8 (4.56)	65.7 (2.59)	17.5 (0.69)	4.3 (0.17)	1.6 (0.06)	4.4 (0.17)	6.2 (0.24)	32.6 (1.28)	96.3 (3.79)	123.0 (4.84)	747.5 (29.42)
Average precipitation days	7.8	8.1	8.4	6.2	3.2	1.9	0.7	0.7	1.2	3.3	5.4	6.3	53.2
Average relative humidity (%)	60.5	65.3	68.4	70.0	67.8	65.6	56.5	50.5	44.3	47.2	51.5	58.7	58.9
Source: Servicio Nacional de Meteorología e Hidrología de Bolivia
