= Flag of La Paz =

Bolivian municipal flag

La Paz
- Bandera paceña
- Proportion: 2:3
- Adopted: July 16, 1809; 217 years ago (Guardian Council); 2006; 20 years ago (La Paz department)
- Designed by: Pedro Murillo (not personally)

Flag of the indigenous and peasant nations and peoples of the lowlands of the Department of La Paz

The flag of the La Paz department in Bolivia, and its capital, La Paz, is a horizontal bicolor. Officially, it has the colors carmine, symbolizing the blood shed in the War of Independence, and emerald, symbolizing wealth, glory, and unity. This flag was created during the revolution in La Paz in 1809 and is the predecessor of the Bolivian national flag.

In addition to the main flag, since 2018 the Department has had a flag representing the indigenous people from its lowland parts. This is a version of the patujú flower flag previously adopted by Santa Cruz and Beni with an additional green border. This flag is officially known as "Flag of the indigenous and peasant nations and peoples of the lowlands of the Department of La Paz".

== History ==
The flag was first used by revolutionaries led by Pedro Murillo on the day of the Virgin of Carmen, 16 July 1809. The flag continued to be used by the Guardian Council established by the rebels until the royalists retook the city on 11 November.

In 1811, the flag was used by José Miguel Lanza, leader of the guerrilla republic of Ayopaya located on the border of today's departments La Paz and Cochabamba. On 28 January 1825, Colonel Lanza, after defeating General Pedro Olañeta, entered La Paz under a scarlet and emerald flag, and eight days later welcomed the expedition of Antonio José de Sucre.

In 2006, decree 152/87 of the La Paz Departmental Council declared the carmine red and emerald green colors as official. In 2008, it declared 31st July as La Paz Flag Day, in memory of the July revolution of 1809. Similarly, Departmental Decree No. 36 approved the "Hymn to the Flag of La Paz," composed by David Martín Quispe and Luis Ayllón Mariscal, consisting of six verses and a refrain.

On 20 November 2018, the Assembly of the Department of La Paz approved the adoption of the "Flag of the indigenous and peasant nations and peoples of the lowlands of the Department of La Paz"

== See also ==
- List of Bolivian flags
- Flag of the patujú flower
