= Lossi =

Lossi can refer to:

- Finnish for ferry
- Hellen Lossi, former First Lady of Guatemala
- Lossi Sanctuary, gorilla reserve in the Republic of the Congo

== See also ==
- AS Lössi, New Caledonian football team
