= Padcaya =

Coordinates: 21°53′14″S 64°42′46″W

Padcaya is a town in the Tarija Department in southeastern Bolivia.

Padcaya is the administrative center of Aniceto Arce Province. It is situated 1,997 m above sea level on the banks of Río Orosas, 50 km south of Tarija, the department capital. Northwest of Padcaya, towards Río Camacho, the town is bordered by a mountain range of 20 km length, Cerro Guancani (2,960 m) being its highest summit.

Padcaya is crossed by the road from Tarija to Bermejo, border town to Argentina in the southern parts of the department.

Padcaya has a population of circa 1,500.

== Climate ==
Climate data for Padcaya, elevation 2,010 m (6,590 ft)
Month	Jan	Feb	Mar	Apr	May	Jun	Jul	Aug	Sep	Oct	Nov	Dec	Year
Mean daily maximum °C (°F)	27.1 (80.8)	27.0 (80.6)	26.4 (79.5)	26.3 (79.3)	25.9 (78.6)	24.6 (76.3)	25.1 (77.2)	26.3 (79.3)	25.3 (77.5)	27.4 (81.3)	26.4 (79.5)	27.8 (82.0)	26.3 (79.3)
Daily mean °C (°F)	19.8 (67.6)	20.0 (68.0)	19.4 (66.9)	18.4 (65.1)	16.8 (62.2)	15.3 (59.5)	14.7 (58.5)	15.5 (59.9)	15.6 (60.1)	18.0 (64.4)	18.3 (64.9)	19.6 (67.3)	17.6 (63.7)
Mean daily minimum °C (°F)	12.6 (54.7)	13.1 (55.6)	12.4 (54.3)	10.3 (50.5)	7.5 (45.5)	5.9 (42.6)	4.4 (39.9)	4.6 (40.3)	6.1 (43.0)	8.5 (47.3)	10.2 (50.4)	11.5 (52.7)	8.9 (48.1)
Average precipitation mm (inches)	144.1 (5.67)	117.1 (4.61)	90.2 (3.55)	30.0 (1.18)	2.8 (0.11)	0.5 (0.02)	1.6 (0.06)	6.5 (0.26)	9.1 (0.36)	37.3 (1.47)	72.9 (2.87)	142.3 (5.60)	654.4 (25.76)
Average precipitation days	14.5	13.2	11.2	4.9	0.6	0.4	0.6	1.2	1.5	6.5	8.3	12.5	75.4
Average relative humidity (%)	72.2	71.8	73.0	69.3	65.0	59.8	56.7	55.3	59.2	59.4	64.6	66.5	64.4
Source: Servicio Nacional de Meteorología e Hidrología de Bolivia
