= Entre Ríos, Tarija =

Entre Ríos
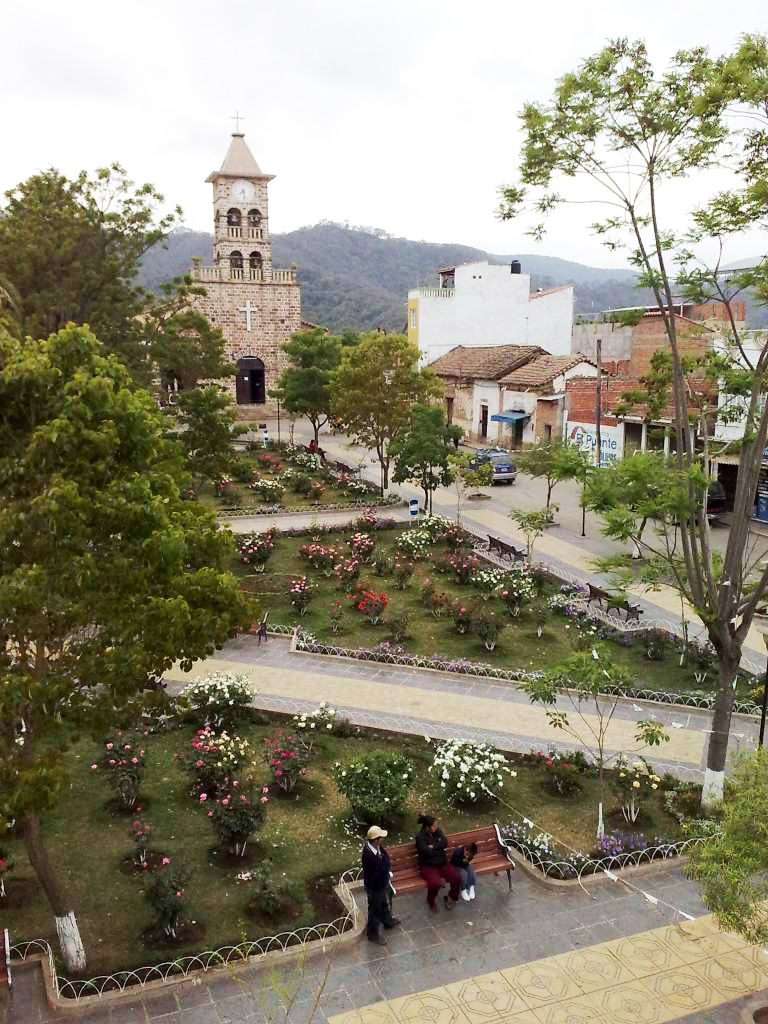

- Location in Bolivia
- Coordinates: 21°31′35″S 64°10′24″W
- Country: Bolivia
- Department: Tarija Department
- Province: Burdett O'Connor Province

Population (2007)
  - Total: 2,800
- Time zone: UTC-4 (BOT)

Entre Ríos (Spanish, 'Between the rivers') is a town in the Bolivian Tarija Department.

== Location ==
Entre Ríos is the administrative center of Burdett O'Connor Province. It is located at an altitude of 1,230 metres (4,040 ft) at the confluence of Río Tambo and one of its tributaries, 110 kilometres (68 mi) and a three-hour ride east of Tarija, the departmental capital. The town is bordered by north-southerly mountain ranges and situated in an elongated triangular hollow of 10 kilometres (6.2 mi) length. It was previously called San Luis.

== Climate ==
The average yearly temperature of Entre Ríos is 20.9 °C, the yearly precipitation of 1,300 mm appears mainly in the summer's wet season from January to March.

Climate data for Entre Ríos, Tarija, elevation 1,260 m (4,130 ft)
Month	Jan	Feb	Mar	Apr	May	Jun	Jul	Aug	Sep	Oct	Nov	Dec	Year
Mean daily maximum °C (°F)	27.4 (81.3)	27.4 (81.3)	25.9 (78.6)	23.6 (74.5)	21.6 (70.9)	20.7 (69.3)	21.7 (71.1)	23.9 (75.0)	26.2 (79.2)	27.8 (82.0)	28.1 (82.6)	28.3 (82.9)	25.2 (77.4)
Daily mean °C (°F)	22.4 (72.3)	22.4 (72.3)	21.2 (70.2)	19.1 (66.4)	16.7 (62.1)	14.1 (57.4)	14.6 (58.3)	16.5 (61.7)	18.6 (65.5)	21.2 (70.2)	21.9 (71.4)	22.6 (72.7)	19.3 (66.7)
Mean daily minimum °C (°F)	17.5 (63.5)	17.4 (63.3)	16.3 (61.3)	14.8 (58.6)	11.7 (53.1)	7.9 (46.2)	7.3 (45.1)	9.0 (48.2)	10.8 (51.4)	14.4 (57.9)	15.9 (60.6)	16.8 (62.2)	13.3 (56.0)
Average precipitation mm (inches)	249.1 (9.81)	206.0 (8.11)	166.1 (6.54)	79.2 (3.12)	12.1 (0.48)	10.6 (0.42)	5.8 (0.23)	5.9 (0.23)	13.4 (0.53)	47.6 (1.87)	125.2 (4.93)	186.0 (7.32)	1,107 (43.59)
Average precipitation days	17.1	14.5	16.2	10.8	4.9	5.0	2.4	2.4	2.0	6.1	10.0	13.0	104.4
Source: Servicio Nacional de Meteorología e Hidrología de Bolivia

== Population ==
Entre Ríos' population at the 2001 census was 2,413 and rose to circa 2,800 people in 2007. The Entre Ríos region is still one of the main settlement areas of the Guaraní people who have inhabited the Paraná Basin for millennia.
