= Villamontes =

Settlement in the Tarjia Department, Bolivia

- Town
- Location within Bolivia
- Coordinates: 21°15′39″S 63°28′34″W
- Country: Bolivia
- Department: Tarija
- Province: Gran Chaco
- Elevation: 388 m (1,273 ft)

Population (2012)
  - Total: 39,800
- Time zone: UTC-4 (BOT)

Villa Montes, also written as Villamontes, is a municipality and city in southern Bolivia, in the Tarija Department, Gran Chaco Province. The city is located on the slopes of the Aguaragüe Range and lies at an elevation of 388 meters above sea level. It is situated on the left bank of the Pilcomayo River and is crossed by the Caiguamí stream.

The main economic activities in the region are livestock farming, beekeeping, and fishing. Petroleum-related activities generate additional sources of employment.

== History ==
The San Francisco Solano Mission was founded on 24 July 1860 by Fathers Alejandro María Corrado and Marino Mariani, during the government of General José María de Achá, at a location known as Puesto Uno. The mission was burned several times by Tobas, Choroti, Tapiete, and Guaraní Indigenous groups.

Subsequently, on 4 October 1862, the San Francisco Solano Mission was relocated a quarter of a league to the west, to the site where the present-day city of Villa Montes is located. This move occurred after Guaraní groups led by the cacique Arobia burned isolated huts and some structures within the quadrangle where the chapel had been built.

In 1866, the Franciscan mission was restored by Friar José Gianelli on the left bank of the Pilcomayo River, with the purpose of converting the Indigenous tribes who lived from fishing to the Catholic religion.

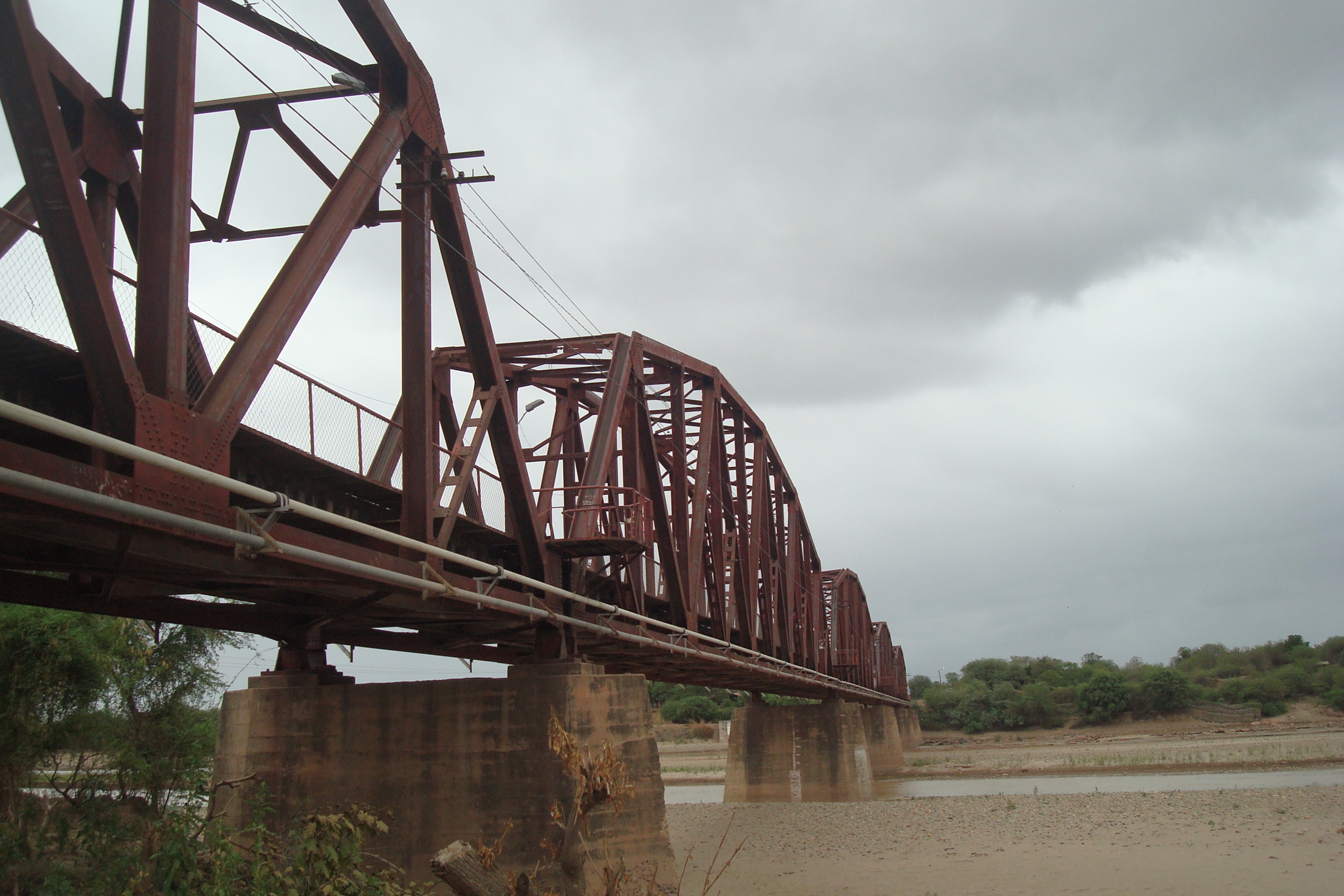
Bridge Ferroviario of Villamontes

=== Foundation ===
Villa Montes was founded by supreme decree on 27 December 1905 on land belonging to the San Francisco Solano and San Antonio de Padua missions, by Leocadio Trigo Achá, prefect of the Tarija Department and commander of the Bolivian expedition to the Chaco.

The supreme decree issued by President Ismael Montes ordered the establishment on those lands of a Civil and Administrative Center, where civil and military authorities would reside, and which would be named Villa Montes and Seat of the National Delegate of the Gran Chaco.

=== Chaco War ===
During the first two years of the Chaco War (1932–1935), Villa Montes was an important center in the Bolivian logistical line, due to its supply depots, workshops, and field hospitals. During the final phase of the war, from January to June 1935, it was the main hub of the Bolivian defensive system in the Chaco. Its defense, aimed at preventing the Tarija region from falling under Paraguayan control, was entrusted to Colonel Bernardino Bilbao Rioja.

After the destruction of the Bolivian Second Army at the end of 1934, and following the general mobilization decreed by President José Luis Tejada Sorzano in December 1934, the Bolivian Third Army was formed. With its 36 regiments, it doubled the size of the army Bolivia had one year earlier and, for the third time, achieved massive numerical superiority over the Paraguayan Army.

This superiority in manpower and materiel allowed Bilbao Rioja, operating in a defensive posture, to withstand the Paraguayan attack launched on 13 February 1935. On 19 April, taking advantage of the Bolivian offensive in the central sector, Bilbao’s forces eliminated the salient created by the Paraguayans during their February attack, recapturing Tarairí.

Villa Montes is also known for the so-called “Corralito of Villamontes”. On 23 November 1934, when President Daniel Salamanca Urey visited the town with the intention of dismissing General Peñaranda for his failure at El Carmen, army units under his command carried out a coup d’état and replaced him with 'Vice President José Luis Tejada Sorzano.

== Geography ==
Villamontes is located in the subhumid tropical zone, with a distinct dry season from June to September. West of the town in a north-southerly direction ranges the sub Andean Sierra del Aguarague, with a summit of 1,390 m 7 km west of Villamontes. The town is crossed by Río Caiguami which discharges into Río Pilcomayo on its southern outskirts.

Villamontes has recorded the hottest temperature ever in Bolivia, 46.7 °C (116.1 °F), several times, most recently on 29 October 2010.

=== Climate ===
Climate data for Villamontes (Aguaraycito), elevation 396 m (1,299 ft), (1991–2015)
Month	Jan	Feb	Mar	Apr	May	Jun	Jul	Aug	Sep	Oct	Nov	Dec	Year
Mean daily maximum °C (°F)	34.6 (94.3)	33.2 (91.8)	31.8 (89.2)	29.2 (84.6)	25.9 (78.6)	25.4 (77.7)	26.3 (79.3)	29.4 (84.9)	32.0 (89.6)	33.9 (93.0)	34.2 (93.6)	34.6 (94.3)	30.9 (87.6)
Daily mean °C (°F)	27.9 (82.2)	27.0 (80.6)	26.0 (78.8)	23.5 (74.3)	19.9 (67.8)	18.7 (65.7)	18.0 (64.4)	20.6 (69.1)	23.4 (74.1)	26.5 (79.7)	27.0 (80.6)	27.8 (82.0)	23.9 (74.9)
Mean daily minimum °C (°F)	21.2 (70.2)	20.8 (69.4)	20.2 (68.4)	17.8 (64.0)	13.9 (57.0)	12.0 (53.6)	9.7 (49.5)	11.8 (53.2)	14.9 (58.8)	19.1 (66.4)	19.7 (67.5)	21.1 (70.0)	16.8 (62.3)
Average precipitation mm (inches)	106.7 (4.20)	131.1 (5.16)	100.0 (3.94)	52.0 (2.05)	15.5 (0.61)	3.6 (0.14)	1.1 (0.04)	0.8 (0.03)	9.6 (0.38)	32.1 (1.26)	74.8 (2.94)	110.3 (4.34)	637.6 (25.09)
Average precipitation days	6.1	7.0	6.3	5.0	2.4	0.9	0.7	0.3	1.2	3.1	4.4	6.9	44.3
Average relative humidity (%)	64.4	70.2	69.8	73.3	71.0	66.5	57.4	47.4	46.9	53.1	57.6	65.7	61.9
Source: Servicio Nacional de Meteorología e Hidrología de Bolivia

== History ==
During the Chaco War between Bolivia and Paraguay (1932–1935) Villamontes accommodated the headquarters of the Bolivian Army. During the final stage of the war, the main lines of defense commanded by General Bernardino Bilbao Rioja were situated here.

Villamontes became famous by the so-called "Corralito de Villamontes" in 1934, when the head of state, Dr. Daniel Salamanca Urey, was arrested by army units during his stay at Villamontes, and on 28 November was substituted in a coup d'état by vice president José Luis Tejada Sorzano.

== Population ==
Villamontes had a population of 11,086 inhabitants in 1992 (census), 16,214 inhabitants in 2001 (census), and has more than 20,000 inhabitants by 2007. In the official data of the census 2012, the municipality of Villa Montes has 39,800 inhabitants which is an increase more than 100% compared to the 2001 census. Reason for the explosive increase has been the deployment of oil and gas fields in this region since the early 1990s.
