= Magdalena Bermejo =

Spanish scientist

Magdalena (Magda) Bermejo (born c. 1962) is a Spanish primatologist and world authority on the western lowland gorilla. Since 1991 she has lived for long periods with her husband, German Illera, in the rainforests of the Republic of Congo, conducting research and becoming increasingly involved in gorilla conservation. She estimated that 5,000 gorillas died from Ebola in Gabon and the Republic of Congo.

== Career ==
Bermejo grew up in Madrid. She began her career as a child psychologist and later as a primatologist. Sometimes known as the "Dian Fossey of the Congo", she currently works for the Programme for Conservation and Rational Utilization of Forest Ecosystems in Central Africa (ECOFAC), a European Union-sponsored program that establishes a regional framework for conserving rainforests in central Africa. She is also a member of the faculty in the Animal Biology Department in the University of Barcelona in Spain.

== Primate research ==
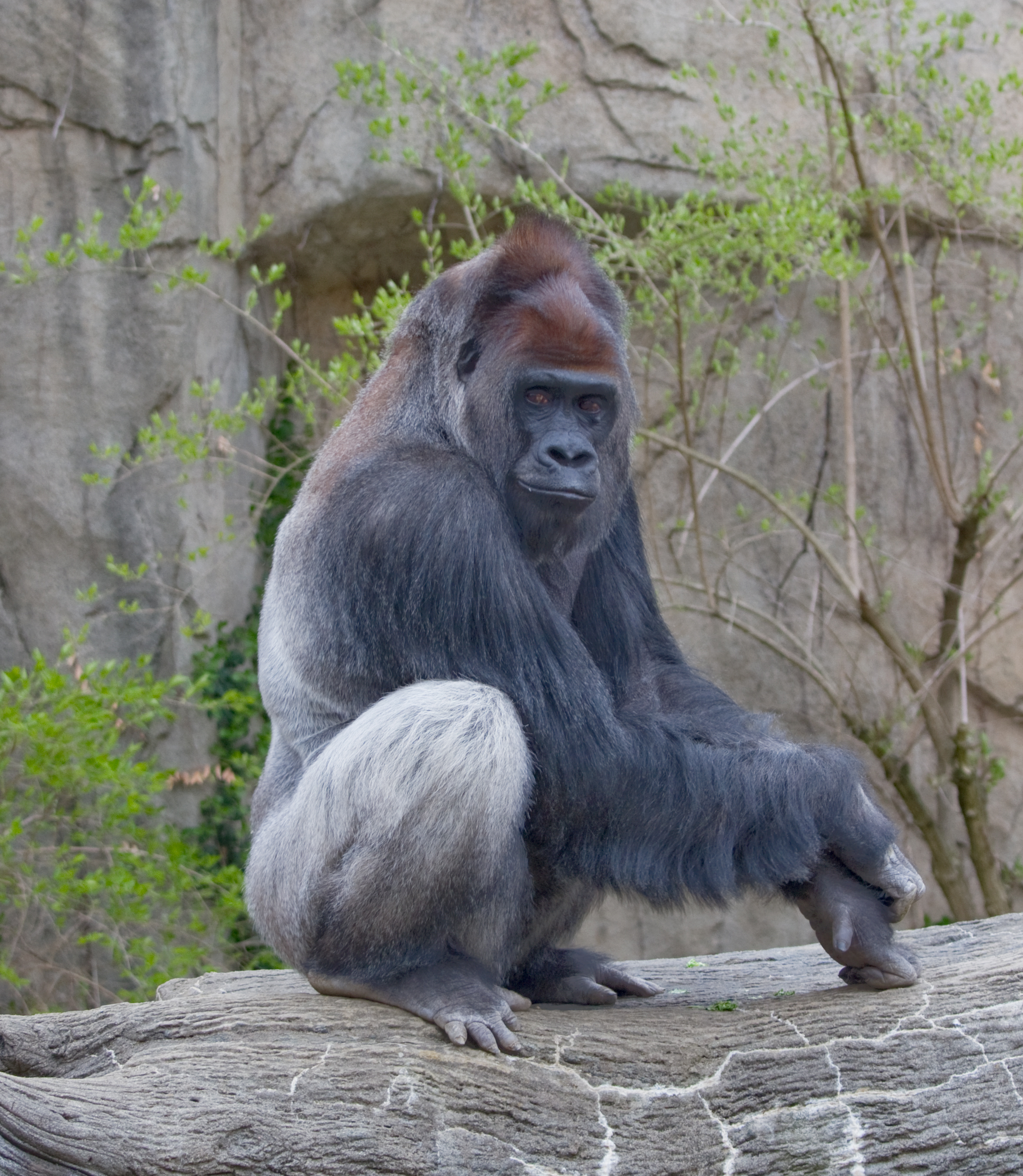
Western Lowland Gorilla (male)

Bermejo first visited Africa in 1986, at the age of 22, to study chimpanzees in Senegal. Then she went to the Lilungu (Ikela) region in Zaire (now the Democratic Republic of the Congo) to study bonobos with a colleague from Barcelona, Jordi Sabater Pi. They began work in 1988 and were forced by war conditions to end it in 1990. Conservationists feared that the bonobos had not survived the war, but a population of bonobos was found in the area in 2005.

While in Barcelona, Bermejo met and married German Ilera, a Spaniard who started as a law student and then became a videographer and naturalist. In 1991, the two started studying gorillas in an area that later became the Lossi Sanctuary. They were the first people to habituate western lowland gorillas to human presence. A prerequisite to studying them, habituation requires daily visits over about three years. By 2002, they had identified 10 social groups in a population of 143. Her work was described in a National Geographic video of 2001.

Between October 2002 and January 2003, at the same time that humans in nearby villages were beginning to die from the Zaire strain of the Ebola virus disease (ZEBOV), 130 of the 143 gorillas died. The researchers monitored seven more social groups, and found that 91 of 95 gorillas died between October 2003 and January 2004. Extrapolating from these results, they estimated that in a 2,700-square-kilometre (1,000 sq mi) area around the Lossi Sanctuary, about 5000 gorillas died. Because of the high mortality rate, the International Union for Conservation of Nature (IUCN) listed the western lowland gorilla as Critically Endangered, one step away from Extinct in the Wild.

Initially, opinions were divided on whether ZEBOV was the cause of the deaths, and if so whether the disease was spread via a reservoir in other species (for example, bats or birds) or by gorilla-to-gorilla transmission. Out of twelve carcasses that Bermejo and her group examined, nine tested positive for Ebola. By the lag time between deaths in neighboring social groups, they were able to show that the disease mainly spread from social group to social group. Based on these results, other scientists have argued for a vaccination campaign to protect other gorillas.

Bermejo has continued to study gorillas after the Ebola outbreak. In 2009, she found a concentration of them near Odzala National Park. Six social groups have been found, two of which are habituated. Among the foci of the study are the impact of Ebola and interactions with other species (chimpanzees and humans).

== Eco-tourism and conservation ==
After the loss of gorillas to Ebola, Bermejo began to create community projects to help both the gorillas and the people in nearby villages. With support from Sabine Plattner African Charities, development of the nearby village Mbomo has begun, with plans for a community center, Internet and educational enrichment. Odzala Discovery Camps: Ngaga Camp is the research site of Bermejo and Illera and their home, has become a destination for safaris run by Congo Conservation Company. The gorilla tours through a Marantaceae (arrowroot) forest are led by trackers who work for Bermejo.

== Works ==
- Bermejo, Magdalena (1999). "Status and conservation of primates in Odzala National Park, Republic of the Congo". Oryx. 33 (4): 324–332. doi:10.1046/j.1365-3008.1999.00081.x.
- Walsh, Peter D.; Abernethy, Kate A.; Bermejo, Magdalena; et al. (2003). "Catastrophic ape decline in western equatorial Africa" (PDF). Nature. 422 (6932): 611–614. doi:10.1038/nature01566. PMID 12679788. S2CID 5905831.
- Leroy, E. M.; Rouquet, P.; Formenty, P.; Souquiere, S.; Kilbourne, A.; Froment, J. M.; Bermejo, M.; et al. (2004). "Multiple Ebola Virus Transmission Events and Rapid Decline of Central African Wildlife" (PDF). Science. 303 (5656): 387–390. doi:10.1126/science.1092528. PMID 14726594. S2CID 43305484. Archived from the original (PDF) on 4 March 2016.
- Bermejo, M.; Rodriguez-Teijeiro, J. D.; Illera, G.; Barroso, A.; Vila, C.; Walsh, P. D. (2006). "Ebola Outbreak Killed 5000 Gorillas". Science. 314 (5805): 1564. doi:10.1126/science.1133105. PMID 17158318.
