= List of Bolivian departments by Human Development Index =

Map of the Bolivian departments by Human Development Index in 2017. Legend: 0.700 – 0.799 0.600 – 0.699 0.500 – 0.599

This is a list of Bolivian departments by Human Development Index as of 2022.

Rank	Department	HDI (2023)
High human development
1	Santa Cruz	0.791
2	Pando	0.758
3	Tarija	0.754
4	Oruro	0.742
5	Beni	0.739
6	La Paz	0.735
–	Bolivia (average)	0.733
7	Cochabamba	0.723
8	Chuquisaca	0.704
Medium human development
9	Potosí	0.648

== See also ==
- List of countries by Human Development Index
