= Bermejo Airport =

Airport in Bolivia

- IATA: BJO; ICAO: SLBJ

Summary
- Airport type: Public
- Operator: Government
- Serves: Bermejo, Bolivia
- Elevation AMSL: 1,250 ft / 381 m
- Coordinates: 22°46′25″S 64°18′46″W

Map
- Location of the airport in Bolivia

Runways
Direction	Length		Surface
Direction	m	ft	Surface
01/19	1,500	4,921	Asphalt
- Sources: AASANA WAD GCM

Bermejo Airport (IATA: BJO, ICAO: SLBJ) is an airport serving Bermejo, a city in the Tarija Department of Bolivia.

Bermejo is in a broad open valley of the Cordillera Central range in southern Bolivia, with distant rising terrain to the west and east.

The Bermejo non-directional beacon (Ident: BJO) is located on the field.

== See also ==
- Transport in Bolivia
- List of airports in Bolivia
