= Bermejo, Bolivia =

Bermejo
- City
- Nickname: "Capital Petrolera de Bolivia"
- Location in Bolivia
- Coordinates: 22°43′56″S 64°20′33″W
- Country: Bolivia
- Department: Tarija Department
- Province: Ancieto Arce
- Elevation: 609 m (1,998 ft)

Population (2012)
  - Total: 35,411
- Time zone: UTC-4 (BOT)

Bermejo is a city in Bolivia, south of the Tariquía Flora and Fauna National Reserve. It is in a broad, open valley of the Cordillera Central range that extends southward into Argentina, and is on the Bermejo River, locally the border between Bolivia and Argentina.

It is served by Bermejo Airport.

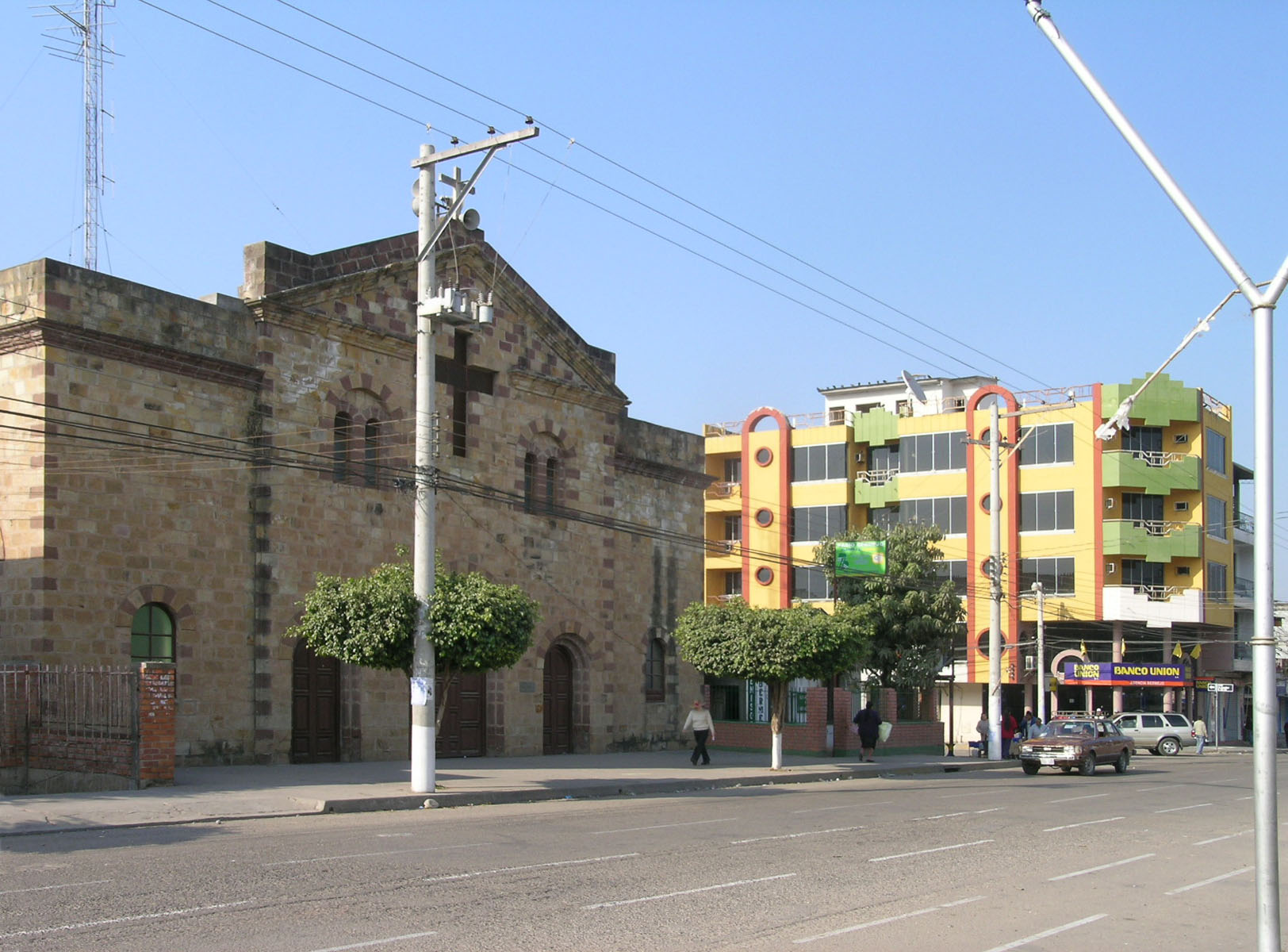
Colonial church in Bermejo

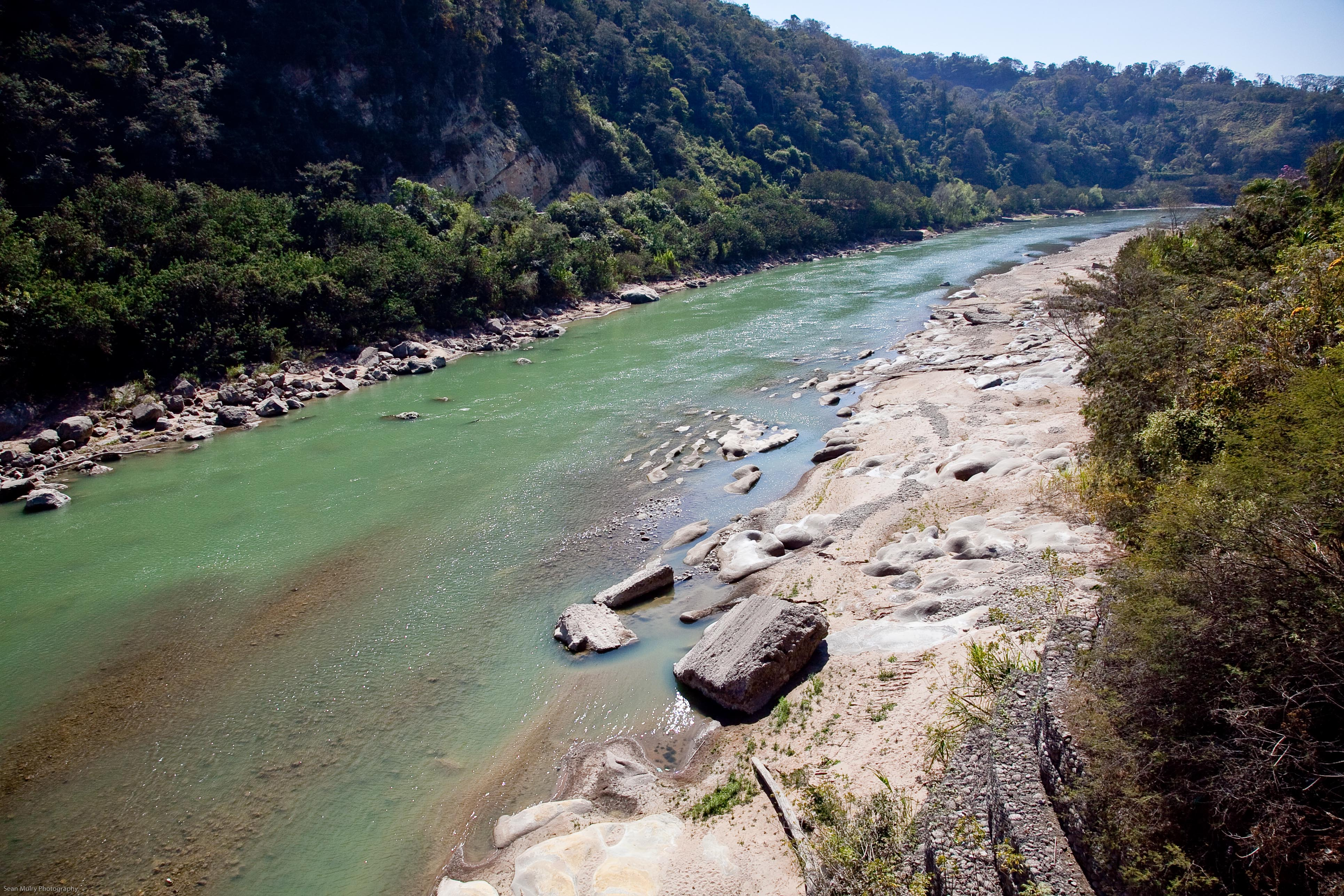
Bermejo River

== Climate ==
Climate data for Bermejo (Bermejo Airport), elevation 385 m (1,263 ft)
Month	Jan	Feb	Mar	Apr	May	Jun	Jul	Aug	Sep	Oct	Nov	Dec	Year
Mean daily maximum °C (°F)	33.2 (91.8)	32.2 (90.0)	30.3 (86.5)	27.0 (80.6)	23.9 (75.0)	21.4 (70.5)	22.7 (72.9)	25.7 (78.3)	29.3 (84.7)	32.4 (90.3)	32.5 (90.5)	33.5 (92.3)	28.7 (83.6)
Daily mean °C (°F)	27.1 (80.8)	26.4 (79.5)	24.9 (76.8)	22.1 (71.8)	18.9 (66.0)	16.0 (60.8)	16.0 (60.8)	18.2 (64.8)	21.3 (70.3)	25.0 (77.0)	25.8 (78.4)	27.0 (80.6)	22.4 (72.3)
Mean daily minimum °C (°F)	20.9 (69.6)	20.6 (69.1)	19.6 (67.3)	17.2 (63.0)	13.9 (57.0)	10.6 (51.1)	9.4 (48.9)	10.7 (51.3)	13.4 (56.1)	17.7 (63.9)	19.2 (66.6)	20.6 (69.1)	16.2 (61.1)
Average precipitation mm (inches)	199.8 (7.87)	197.6 (7.78)	179.3 (7.06)	96.0 (3.78)	29.0 (1.14)	13.8 (0.54)	12.7 (0.50)	5.4 (0.21)	16.5 (0.65)	59.6 (2.35)	108.5 (4.27)	179.9 (7.08)	1,098.1 (43.23)
Average precipitation days	11.0	10.3	11.3	9.6	5.1	3.9	2.5	1.6	2.2	5.6	8.1	9.9	81.1
Average relative humidity (%)	73.7	77.4	80.4	82.0	79.8	80.1	74.2	67.2	61.1	62.6	67.3	70.6	73.0
Source: Servicio Nacional de Meteorología e Hidrología de Bolivia
