= La Guardia, Bolivia =

Coordinates: 17°53′31″S 63°19′52″W

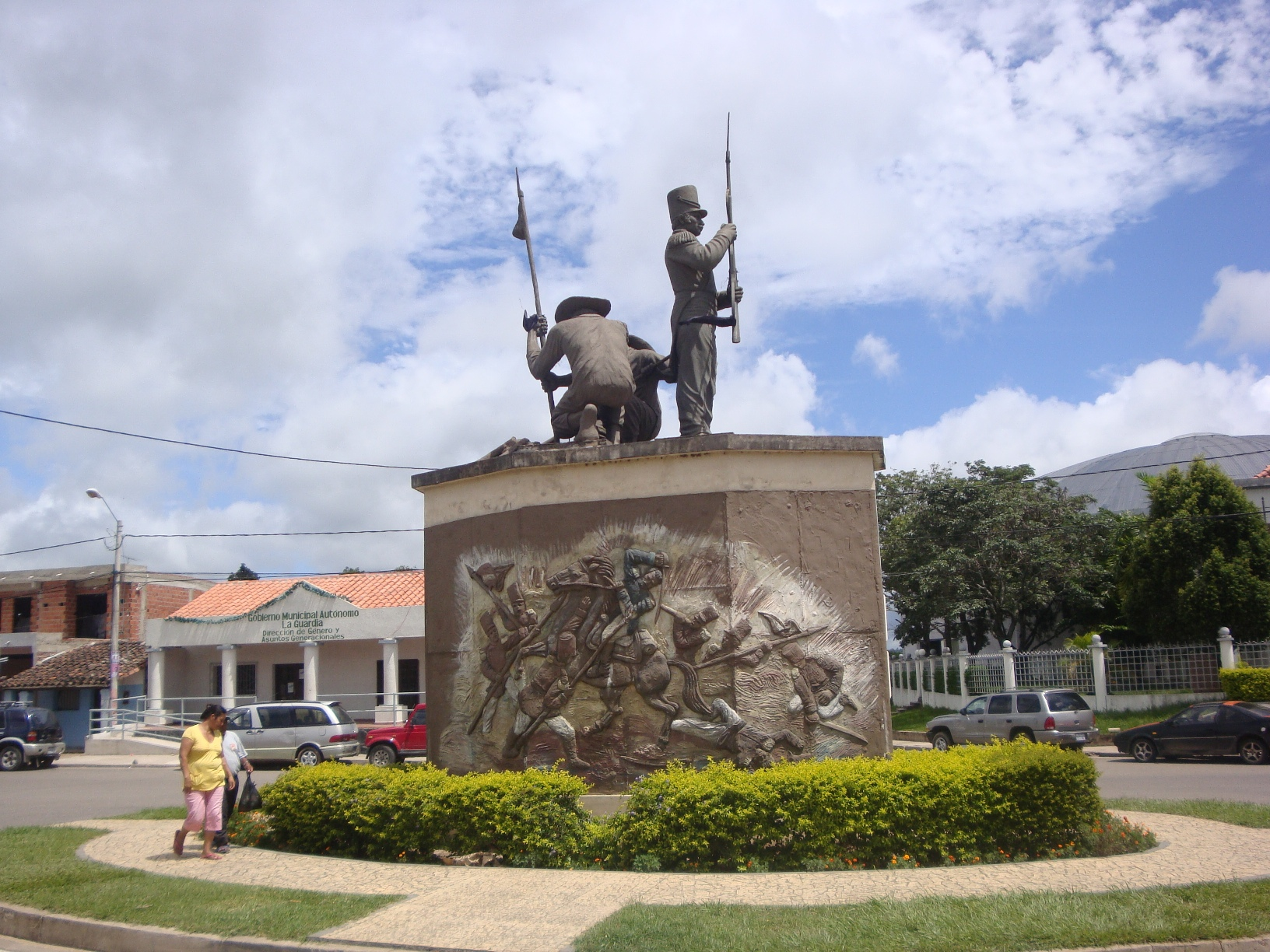
La Guardia, Bolivia - panoramio

La Guardia is a town of almost 75,000 inhabitants in the Santa Cruz Department of Bolivia. It is the 15th most populous town in the country, and is the fastest growing town in Bolivia.

== Population ==
The urban population of La Guardia has risen to more than the fivefold over the past four decades:

Year	Population	Source
1976	2,337	Census
1992	5,468	Census
2001	29,745	Census
2012	74,546	Census
