= Tariquía Flora and Fauna National Reserve =

Bolivian nature reserve

- Reserva Nacional de Flora y Fauna Tariquía
- Location within Bolivia
- Location: Tarija Department, Bolivia
- Coordinates: 21°59′10″S 64°20′24″W
- Area: 2,468.7 km^{2} (953.2 sq mi)
- Established: 1989 (D.S: Nº 22277)
- Governing body: Servicio Nacional de Áreas Protegidas (SERNAP)

Tariquía Flora and Fauna National Reserve (Reserva Nacional de Flora y Fauna Tariquía) is a protected area in the Tarija Department, Bolivia, situated in the Aniceto Arce Province, Burnet O'Connor Province, Gran Chaco Province and José María Avilés Province. It protects part of the Central Andean puna, Southern Andean Yungas, and Bolivian montane dry forests ecoregions.

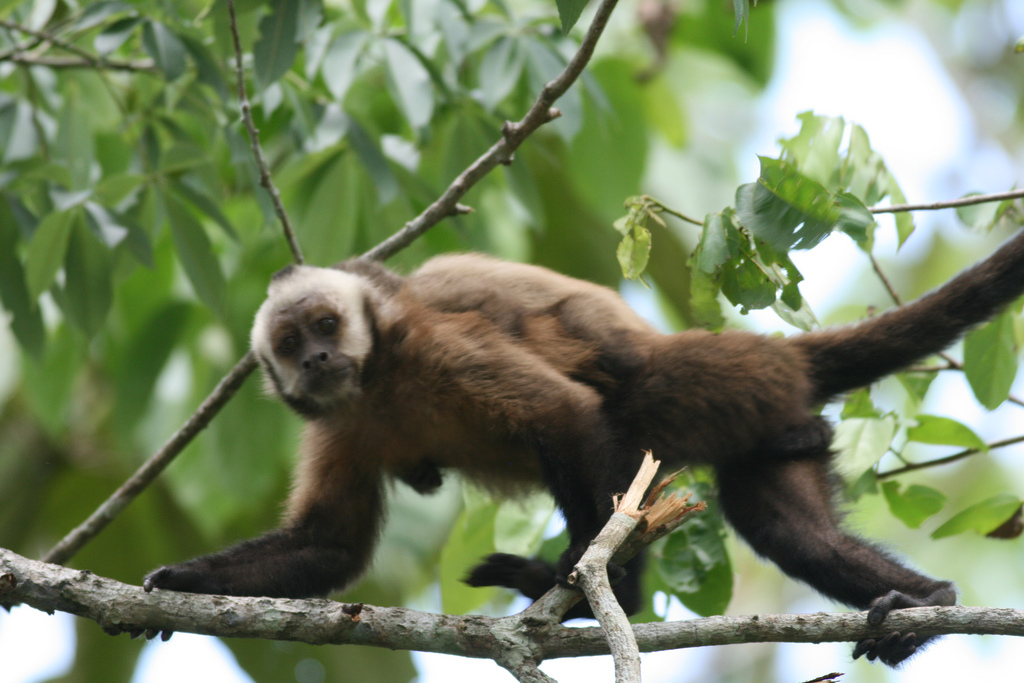
Tufted capuchin

== See also ==
- Baritú National Park
