= Aguaragüe National Park and Integrated Management Natural Area =

Protected area in Bolivia

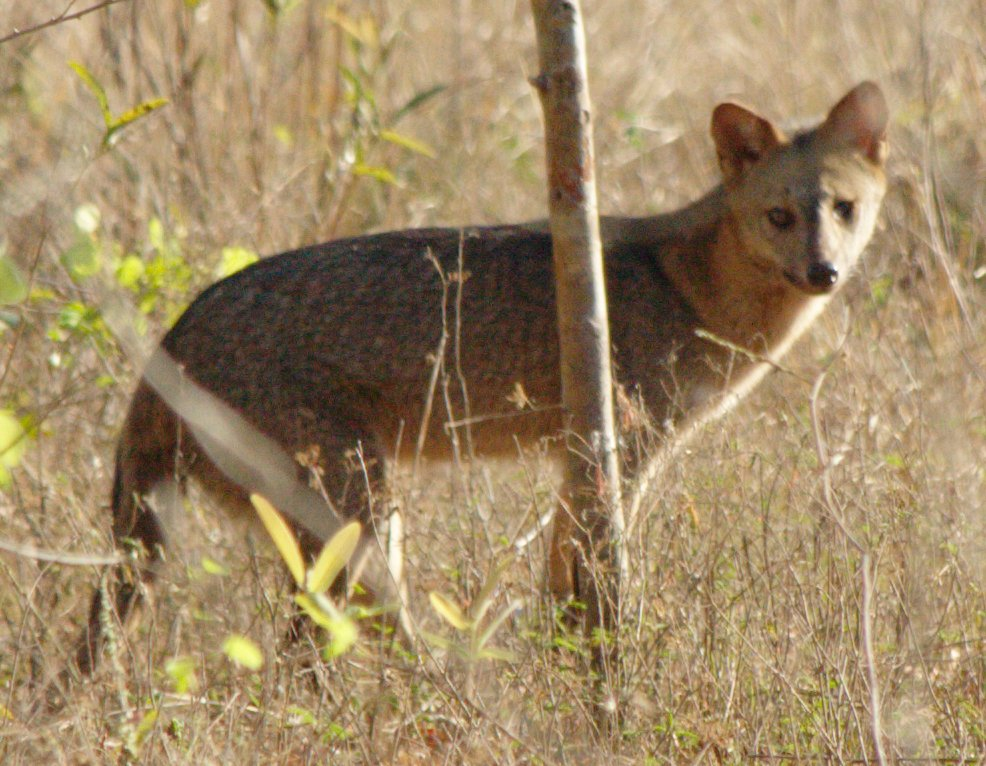
- Crab-eating fox

- Location within Bolivia
- Location: Bolivia; Tarija Department
- Coordinates: 21°30′0″S 63°36′0″W
- Area: 108,307 ha (267,630 acres)
- Established: April 20, 2000
- Governing body: Servicio Nacional de Áreas Protegidas (SERNAP)

Aguaragüe National Park and Integrated Management Natural Area (Parque Nacional y Área Natural de Manejo Integrado Serranía del Aguaragüe) is a protected area in Bolivia situated in the Tarija Department, Gran Chaco Province. The national park covers the whole of Serranía del Aguaragüe, the easternmost mayor Sub-Andean range.

The Southern Andean Yungas montane forests cover much of the park. A portion is in the Dry Chaco.
