= Alvaro Bermejo =

Spanish writer and journalist

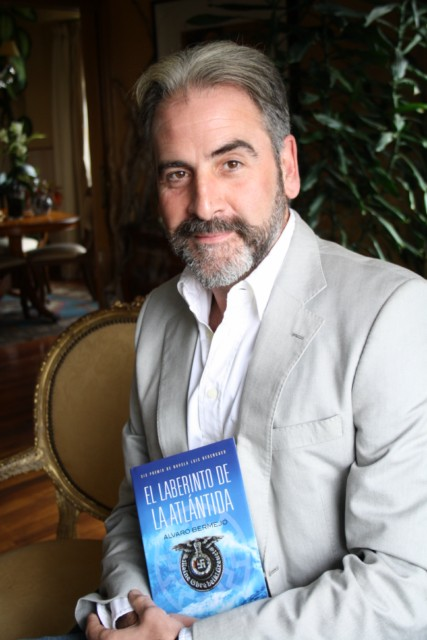
- Bermejo in 2010
- Born: 1 August 1959 (age 66); San Sebastián
- Occupation: Writer

Álvaro Bermejo Marcos (born 1959) is a Spanish writer.

Álvaro Bermejo Marcos was born on 1 August 1959 in San Sebastián. He won the Ateneo de Sevilla prize in 2001 for La piedra imán. In 2008, he won the Ateneo de Novela Histórica prize for Un pez en el Tíbet.

== Publications ==
- 1998: El reino del año mil
- 2001: La piedra imán
- 2008: Un pez en el Tíbet
