= Yacuiba =

- City
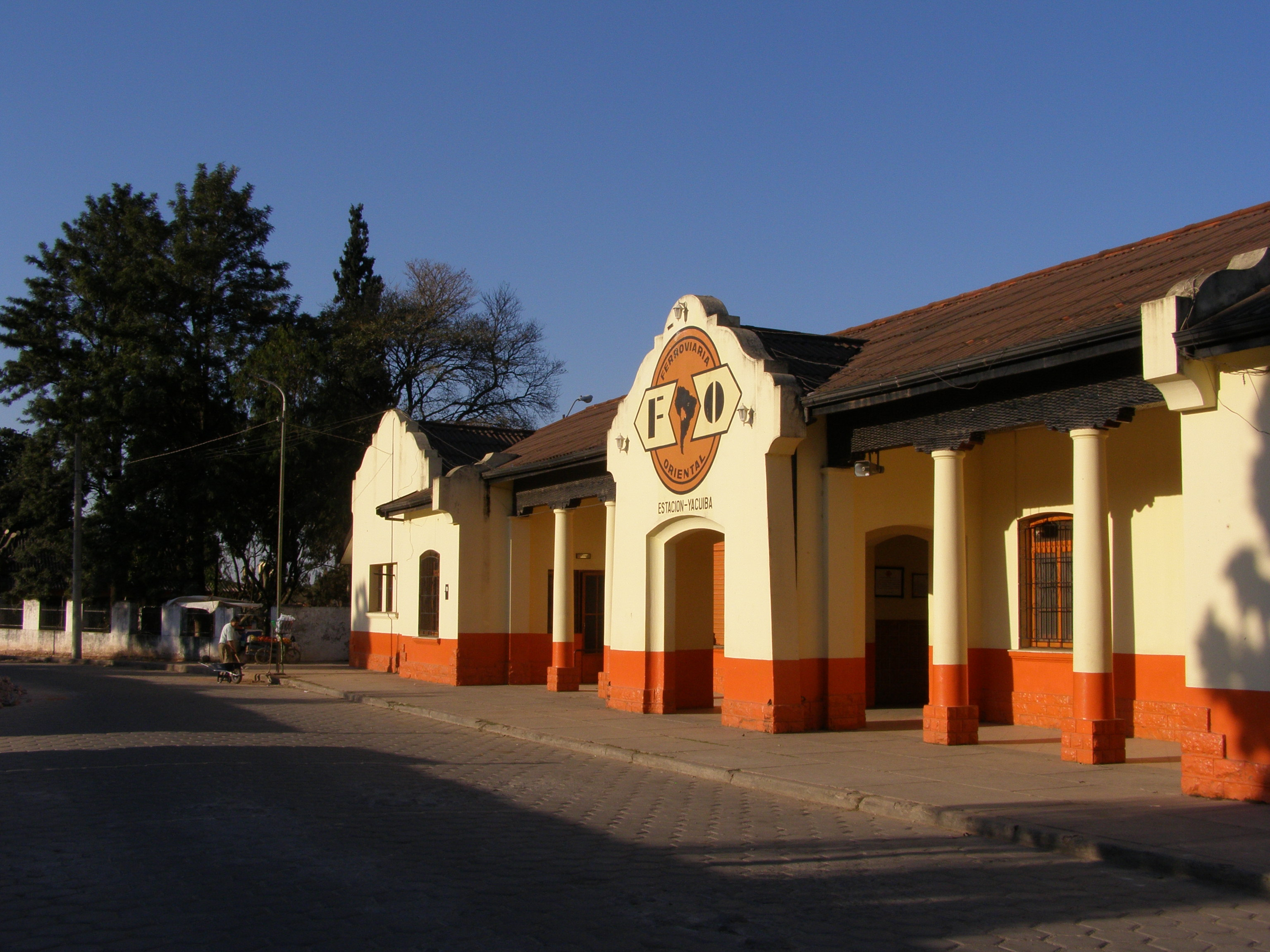

- Flag

- Location in Bolivia
- Coordinates: 22°00′55″S 63°40′38″W
- Country: Bolivia
- Department: Tarija
- Province: Gran Chaco
- Municipality: Yacuiba Municipality
- Canton: Yacuiba Canton
- Elevation: 650 m (2,130 ft)

Population (2012)
  - Total: 108,578
- Time zone: UTC-4 (BOT)
- Website: Official website

Yacuiba is a city in southern Bolivia and the capital city of Gran Chaco Province in the Tarija Department. It lies three kilometers from the Argentine border. It has a population of approximately 97,000 and lies 620 to 680 m (2,034–2,231 ft) above sea level. Yacuiba is one fastest growing cities in Bolivia in terms of population due to the commerce and boom in hydrocarbon exploitation. It was part of Salta Province of Argentina until its cession to Bolivia in 1900.

Due to its position on the frontier, Yacuiba is a major center of commerce. Across the border lies Salvador Mazza, with which it forms a conurbation.

The town has direct connections by road with both Tarija and Santa Cruz. It also has an international airport (BYC). Despite its relatively small population, Yacuiba managed to obtain one football team in the Bolivian professional league, Club Petrolero.

== Climate ==
Yacuiba has a dry-winter humid subtropical climate (Köppen: Cwa), a result of its slightly cooler temperatures when compared to surrounding regions because of its modest elevation and the monsoonal effects of the surrounding area.

Climate data for Yacuiba, elevation 580 m (1,900 ft)
Month	Jan	Feb	Mar	Apr	May	Jun	Jul	Aug	Sep	Oct	Nov	Dec	Year
Mean daily maximum °C (°F)	31.4 (88.5)	30.4 (86.7)	28.7 (83.7)	25.6 (78.1)	23.1 (73.6)	21.1 (70.0)	22.5 (72.5)	25.6 (78.1)	27.9 (82.2)	30.4 (86.7)	31.0 (87.8)	31.5 (88.7)	27.4 (81.4)
Daily mean °C (°F)	25.3 (77.5)	24.6 (76.3)	23.4 (74.1)	20.7 (69.3)	17.9 (64.2)	15.5 (59.9)	15.2 (59.4)	17.5 (63.5)	20.2 (68.4)	23.3 (73.9)	24.3 (75.7)	25.2 (77.4)	21.1 (70.0)
Mean daily minimum °C (°F)	19.3 (66.7)	18.9 (66.0)	18.1 (64.6)	15.7 (60.3)	12.7 (54.9)	9.9 (49.8)	8.0 (46.4)	9.4 (48.9)	12.4 (54.3)	16.2 (61.2)	17.7 (63.9)	19 (66)	14.8 (58.6)
Average precipitation mm (inches)	203.1 (8.00)	189.3 (7.45)	192.2 (7.57)	99.4 (3.91)	33.9 (1.33)	18.0 (0.71)	6.0 (0.24)	7.4 (0.29)	10.0 (0.39)	50.1 (1.97)	114.7 (4.52)	173.3 (6.82)	1,097.4 (43.2)
Average precipitation days	10.5	10.1	11.0	10.1	7.2	5.4	2.8	1.5	2.2	5.3	8.1	9.6	83.8
Average relative humidity (%)	71.8	74.3	78.1	80.7	79.4	77.9	69.0	59.1	54.6	57.5	62.9	67.7	69.4
Source: Servicio Nacional de Meteorología e Hidrología de Bolivia

== Etymology ==
The city's name is derived from the Guaraní yaku-iba, meaning roughly "fowls' watering hole"
