= Lossi Sanctuary =

Lossi Gorilla Sanctuary
- IUCN category IV (habitat/species management area)
- Location within Republic of the Congo Location within Africa
- Interactive map of Lossi Gorilla Sanctuary
- Location: Kelle District, Western Cuvette, Republic of the Congo
- Nearest city: Kellé
- Coordinates: 0°10′48″N 14°31′01″E
- Area: 350 km^{2} (140 sq mi)
- Established: 2001

The Lossi Gorilla Sanctuary is found in northwestern Republic of the Congo. It was established on 10 May 2001. This site is 350 km^{2} (140 sq mi). The reserve was effectively created by the local community, who established an eco-tourism project here. It is also used for research.

== Ebola outbreak ==
Due to ebola outbreak gorillas mortality rate at Lossi and it vicinity of several thousand square kilometers was estimated at 95 percent. For chimpanzees mortality rate reached 77 percent. Ebola outbreak had also negatively impacted ecotourism in neighboring Odzala National Park.
