= Burdett O'Connor Province =

Burdett O'Connor Burdett O'Connor
- Province
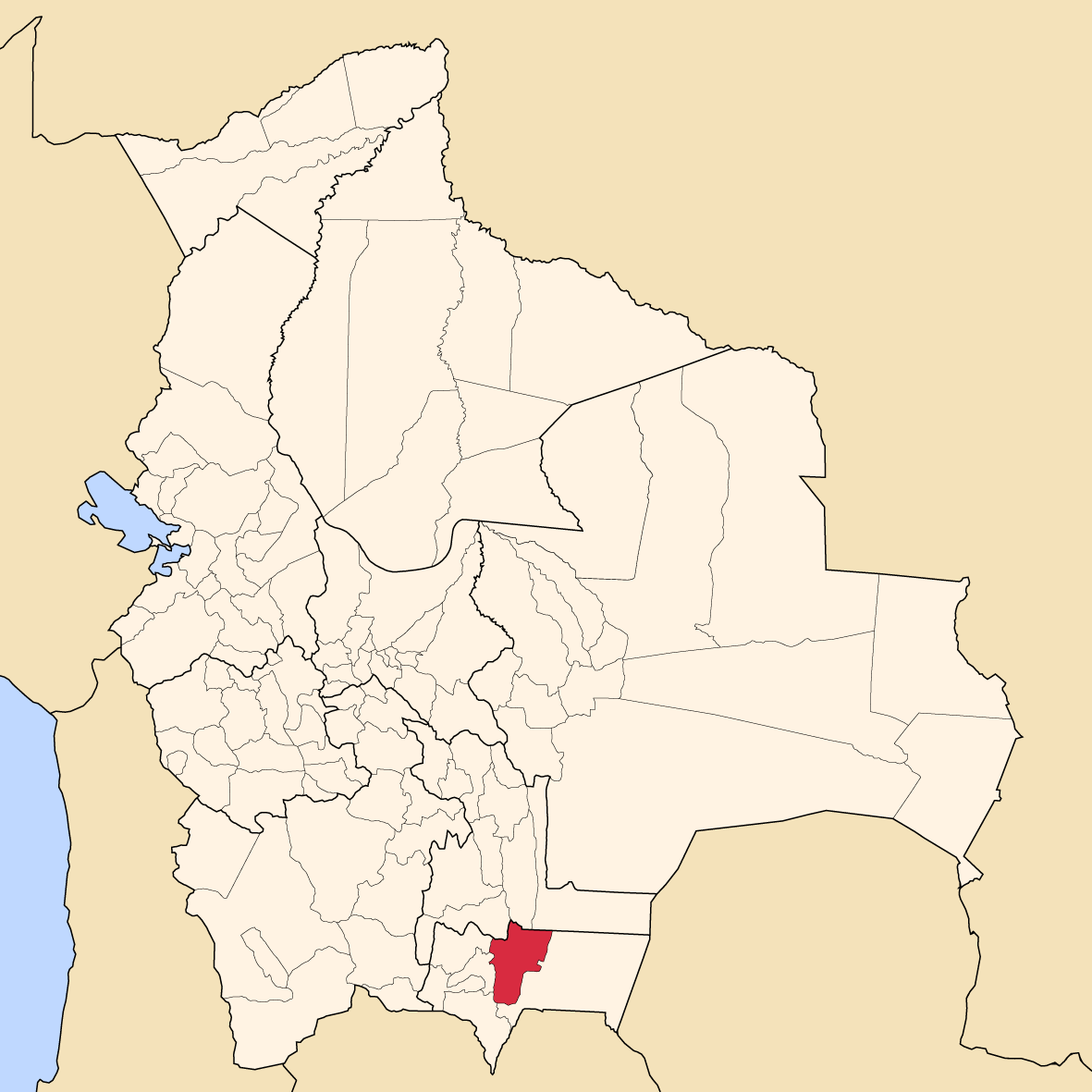
- Location of Burnet O'Connor in Bolivia

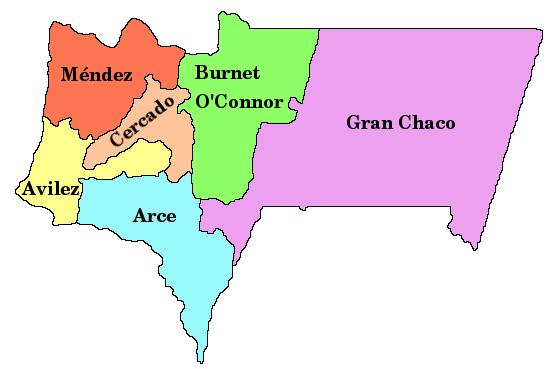
- Location of Burnet O'Connor in Tarija
- Coordinates: 21°30′S 64°05′W
- Country: Bolivia
- Department: Tarija
- Capital: Entre Ríos

Area
  - Total: 6,043 km^{2} (2,333 sq mi)

Population (2024 census)
  - Total: 20,846
  - Density: 3.450/km^{2} (8.934/sq mi)

Burdett O'Connor is a province in the northern part of Tarija Department in Bolivia, named after Francisco Burdett O'Connor, a chronicler of the South American War of Independence and the making of Tarija.

== Location ==
Burdett O'Connor province is one of six provinces in the Tarija Department. It is located between 20° 53' and 21° 58' south and between 63° 36' and 64° 26' west.

The province borders Chuquisaca Department in the north, Eustaquio Méndez Province in the north-west, Cercado Province in the west, Aniceto Arce Province in the south-west, and Gran Chaco Province in the south and east.

The province extends over 140 kilometres (87 mi) from north to south, and 100 kilometres (62 mi) from east to west.

== Population ==
The main language of the province is Spanish, spoken by 98.4%, while 10.3% of the population speak Guaraní, also 1.8 speak Quechua, and 0.3% Aymara (by western immigrants).

The population increased from 17,763 inhabitants (1992 census) to 19,339 (2001 census), an increase of 8.9%. 47.5% of the population are younger than 15 years old.

89.5% of the population have no access to electricity, 84.5% have no sanitary facilities.

51.6% of the population are employed in agriculture, 14.6% in mining, 7.0% in industry, 26.8% in general services (2001).

89.9% of the population are Catholics, 4.0% are Protestants (1992).

== Division ==
In contrast to the neighbouring provinces, the province comprises only one municipio which is Entre Ríos. It is identical to the Burdett O'Connor Province.

== Places of interest ==
- Tariquía Flora and Fauna National Reserve
