= Gran Chaco Province =

Province of Bolivia

Gran Chaco Gran Chaco
- Province
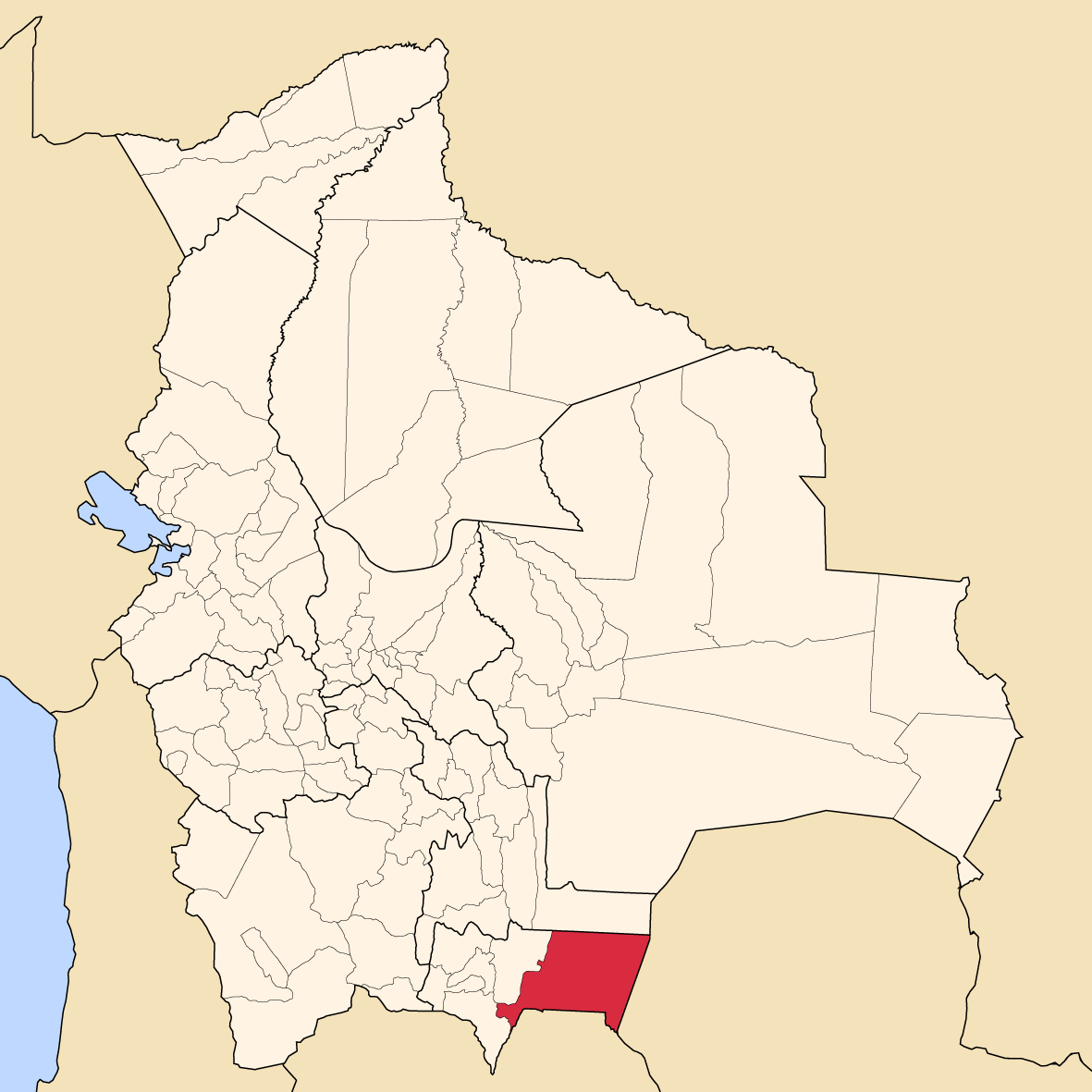
- Location of Gran Chaco in Bolivia

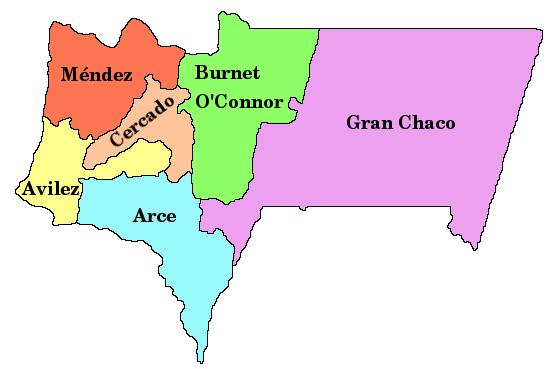
- Location of Gran Chaco in Tarija
- Coordinates: 21°40′S 62°45′W
- Country: Bolivia
- Department: Tarija
- Capital: Yacuíba

Area
  - Total: 17,594 km^{2} (6,793 sq mi)

Population (2024 census)
  - Total: 159,237
  - Density: 8.6/km^{2} (22/sq mi)

Gran Chaco is a province in the eastern part of Bolivia, located in the department of Tarija. The province voted to become an autonomous region on December 6, 2009.

== Location ==
Gran Chaco province is one of six provinces in the Tarija Department. It is located between 21° 00' and 22° 17' south and between 62° 16' and 64° 18' west.

The province borders Chuquisaca Department in the north, Burnet O'Connor Province in the north-west, Aniceto Arce Province in the south-west, Argentina in the south, and Paraguay in the east.

The province extends over 200 km from north to south, and 200 km from east to west.

== Demographics ==
The main language of the province is Spanish, spoken by 98.4%, while 11.5% of the population speak Quechua, 3.0% speak Aymara, and 2.7% Guaraní.

The population increased from 74,612 inhabitants (1992 census) to 116,318 (2001 census), an increase of 55.9%. 41.9% of the population were then younger than 15 years old.

50.7% of the population had no access to electricity, 41.1% had no sanitary facilities (1992).

19.1% of the population are employed in agriculture, 1.4% in mining, 8.3% in industry, 71.2% in general services (2001).

86.8% of the population are Catholics, 9.4% are Protestants (as of 1992).

The latest census in Bolivia (2024) counted 159,237 people (148,766, aged 4 and over) in the province, out of which 2,903 were German-speaking Mennonites aged 4 and over or 2.0% of the entire population.

== Division ==
The province comprises three municipalities:

- Caraparí Municipality
- Villamontes Municipality
- Yacuiba Municipality

== Places of interest ==
- Aguaragüe National Park and Integrated Management Natural Area
- Tariquía Flora and Fauna National Reserve

== See also ==
- Agriculture of Bolivia
- Provinces of Bolivia
- Bolivia
- Bolivian cuisine
- Bolivian wine
