= Aniceto Arce Province =

Province in Bolivia

Provincia Aniceto Arce
- Province
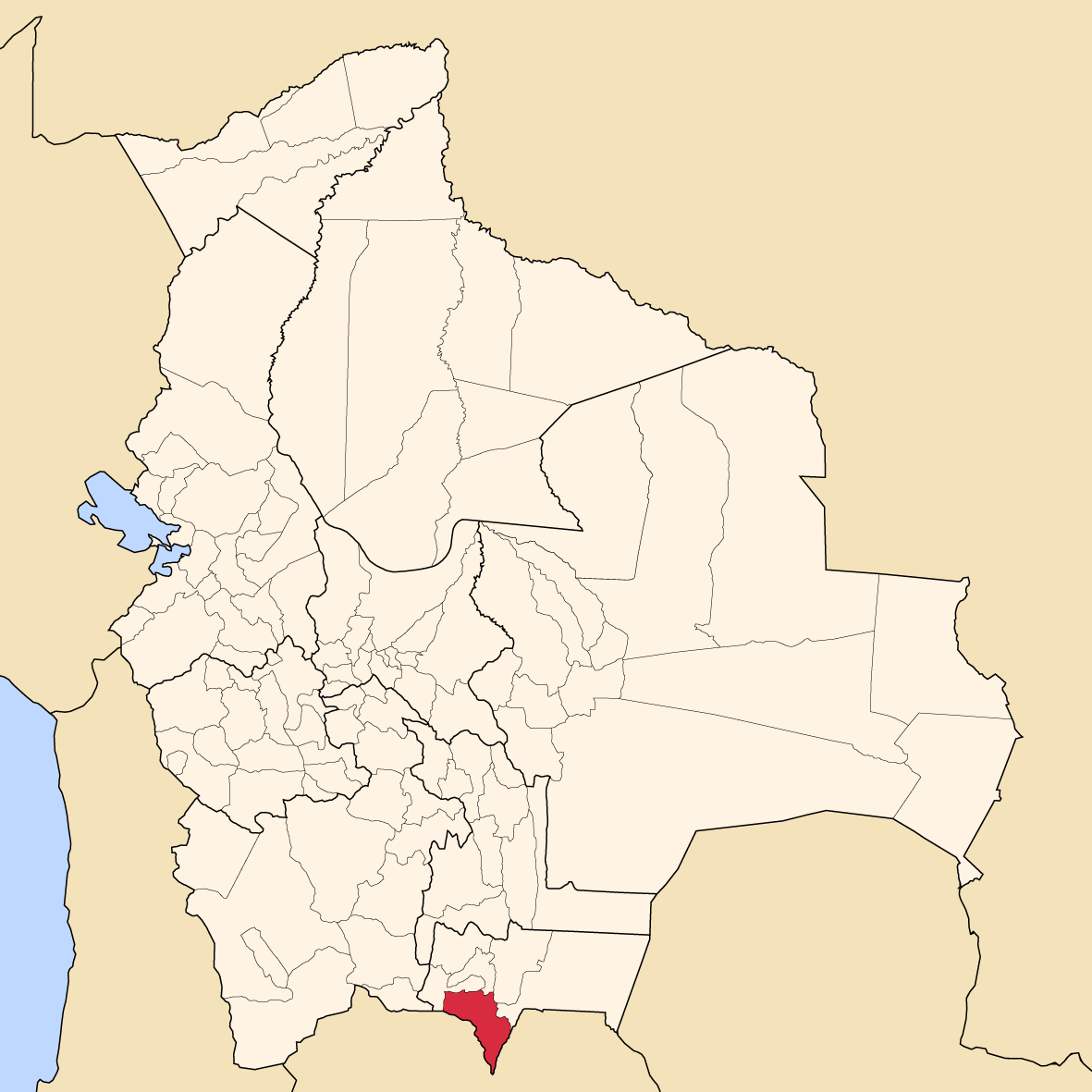
- Location in Bolivia
- Interactive map of Provincia Aniceto Arce
- Country: Bolivia
- Department: Tarija

Area
  - Total: 4,910 km^{2} (1,900 sq mi)

Population (2024)
  - Total: 54,750
  - Density: 11.2/km^{2} (28.9/sq mi)
- ISO 3166 code: BO.TR.AA

Aniceto Arce (or short: Arce) is a province in the southern parts of the Bolivian department Tarija. The province is named after Aniceto Arce Ruiz (1824–1906), President of Bolivia from 1888 until 1892. Its capital city is Padcaya.

== Location ==
Aniceto Arce province is one of six provinces in the Tarija Department. It is located between 21° 45' and 22° 53' south and between 64° 06' and 65° 02' west.

The province borders Cercado Province and José María Avilés Province in the north, the Republic of Argentina in the west and south-east, Gran Chaco Province in the east, and Burnet O'Connor Province in the north-east.

The province extends over 140 km from north to south, and 100 km from east to west.

== Population ==
The main language of the province is Spanish, spoken by 80.7%, and 0.2% Guaraní.

The population increased from 44,713 inhabitants (1992 census) to 52,570 (2001 census), an increase of 17.6%. 42.9% of the population are younger than 15 years old.

55.4% of the population have no access to electricity, 51.4% have no sanitary facilities.

As of 2001, 42.1% of the population were employed in agriculture, 0.1% in mining, 10.2% in industry, 47.6% in general services.

In 1992, 87.4% of the population were Catholics and 8.9% are Protestants.

== Division ==
The province comprises two municipalities:

- Bermejo Municipality
- Padcaya Municipality

== Places of interest ==
- Tariquía Flora and Fauna National Reserve

== Climate ==
Climate data for Padcaya, elevation 2,010 m (6,590 ft)
Month	Jan	Feb	Mar	Apr	May	Jun	Jul	Aug	Sep	Oct	Nov	Dec	Year
Mean daily maximum °C (°F)	27.1 (80.8)	27.0 (80.6)	26.4 (79.5)	26.3 (79.3)	25.9 (78.6)	24.6 (76.3)	25.1 (77.2)	26.3 (79.3)	25.3 (77.5)	27.4 (81.3)	26.4 (79.5)	27.8 (82.0)	26.3 (79.3)
Daily mean °C (°F)	19.8 (67.6)	20.0 (68.0)	19.4 (66.9)	18.4 (65.1)	16.8 (62.2)	15.3 (59.5)	14.7 (58.5)	15.5 (59.9)	15.6 (60.1)	18.0 (64.4)	18.3 (64.9)	19.6 (67.3)	17.6 (63.7)
Mean daily minimum °C (°F)	12.6 (54.7)	13.1 (55.6)	12.4 (54.3)	10.3 (50.5)	7.5 (45.5)	5.9 (42.6)	4.4 (39.9)	4.6 (40.3)	6.1 (43.0)	8.5 (47.3)	10.2 (50.4)	11.5 (52.7)	8.9 (48.1)
Average precipitation mm (inches)	144.1 (5.67)	117.1 (4.61)	90.2 (3.55)	30.0 (1.18)	2.8 (0.11)	0.5 (0.02)	1.6 (0.06)	6.5 (0.26)	9.1 (0.36)	37.3 (1.47)	72.9 (2.87)	142.3 (5.60)	654.4 (25.76)
Average precipitation days	14.5	13.2	11.2	4.9	0.6	0.4	0.6	1.2	1.5	6.5	8.3	12.5	75.4
Average relative humidity (%)	72.2	71.8	73.0	69.3	65.0	59.8	56.7	55.3	59.2	59.4	64.6	66.5	64.4
Source: Servicio Nacional de Meteorología e Hidrología de Bolivia

Climate data for Rancho Campanario (La Merced), elevation 1,509 m (4,951 ft), (1999–2015)
Month	Jan	Feb	Mar	Apr	May	Jun	Jul	Aug	Sep	Oct	Nov	Dec	Year
Mean daily maximum °C (°F)	28.3 (82.9)	27.7 (81.9)	26.7 (80.1)	24.6 (76.3)	22.3 (72.1)	22.6 (72.7)	22.5 (72.5)	24.0 (75.2)	25.1 (77.2)	27.0 (80.6)	27.7 (81.9)	28.1 (82.6)	25.6 (78.0)
Daily mean °C (°F)	22.0 (71.6)	21.5 (70.7)	20.8 (69.4)	18.6 (65.5)	15.5 (59.9)	14.8 (58.6)	14.3 (57.7)	15.6 (60.1)	17.1 (62.8)	19.9 (67.8)	20.7 (69.3)	21.7 (71.1)	18.5 (65.4)
Mean daily minimum °C (°F)	15.7 (60.3)	15.4 (59.7)	14.9 (58.8)	12.6 (54.7)	8.8 (47.8)	7.1 (44.8)	6.0 (42.8)	7.1 (44.8)	9.1 (48.4)	12.9 (55.2)	13.7 (56.7)	15.3 (59.5)	11.5 (52.8)
Average precipitation mm (inches)	141.9 (5.59)	100.1 (3.94)	83.9 (3.30)	13.9 (0.55)	1.0 (0.04)	0.2 (0.01)	0 (0)	0 (0)	7.1 (0.28)	37.9 (1.49)	46.7 (1.84)	97.6 (3.84)	530.3 (20.88)
Average precipitation days	11.6	10.8	9.1	3.6	0.6	0.1	0.1	0	1.2	5.2	7.2	11.0	60.5
Source: Servicio Nacional de Meteorología e Hidrología de Bolivia

Climate data for Coyambuyo (Emborozu), elevation 881 m (2,890 ft), (1975–2015)
Month	Jan	Feb	Mar	Apr	May	Jun	Jul	Aug	Sep	Oct	Nov	Dec	Year
Mean daily maximum °C (°F)	31.2 (88.2)	30.4 (86.7)	28.9 (84.0)	25.0 (77.0)	21.0 (69.8)	20.7 (69.3)	20.9 (69.6)	25.4 (77.7)	27.7 (81.9)	29.6 (85.3)	30.1 (86.2)	29.8 (85.6)	26.7 (80.1)
Daily mean °C (°F)	25.0 (77.0)	24.3 (75.7)	23.7 (74.7)	20.4 (68.7)	16.2 (61.2)	14.9 (58.8)	13.5 (56.3)	16.4 (61.5)	18.7 (65.7)	22.1 (71.8)	23.1 (73.6)	23.8 (74.8)	20.2 (68.3)
Mean daily minimum °C (°F)	18.7 (65.7)	18.3 (64.9)	18.4 (65.1)	15.9 (60.6)	11.3 (52.3)	9.1 (48.4)	6.1 (43.0)	7.4 (45.3)	9.7 (49.5)	14.6 (58.3)	16.1 (61.0)	17.9 (64.2)	13.6 (56.5)
Average precipitation mm (inches)	407.7 (16.05)	362.3 (14.26)	368.1 (14.49)	176.9 (6.96)	55.7 (2.19)	33.2 (1.31)	21.6 (0.85)	11.8 (0.46)	35.2 (1.39)	93.4 (3.68)	197.5 (7.78)	344 (13.5)	2,107.4 (82.92)
Average precipitation days	17.2	17.4	20.0	15.6	11.5	8.9	6.6	5.1	6.3	10.0	12.4	16.2	147.2
Source: Servicio Nacional de Meteorología e Hidrología de Bolivia
