= Tarija Department =

Department of Bolivia

Tarija Departamento de Tarija (Spanish)
- Department
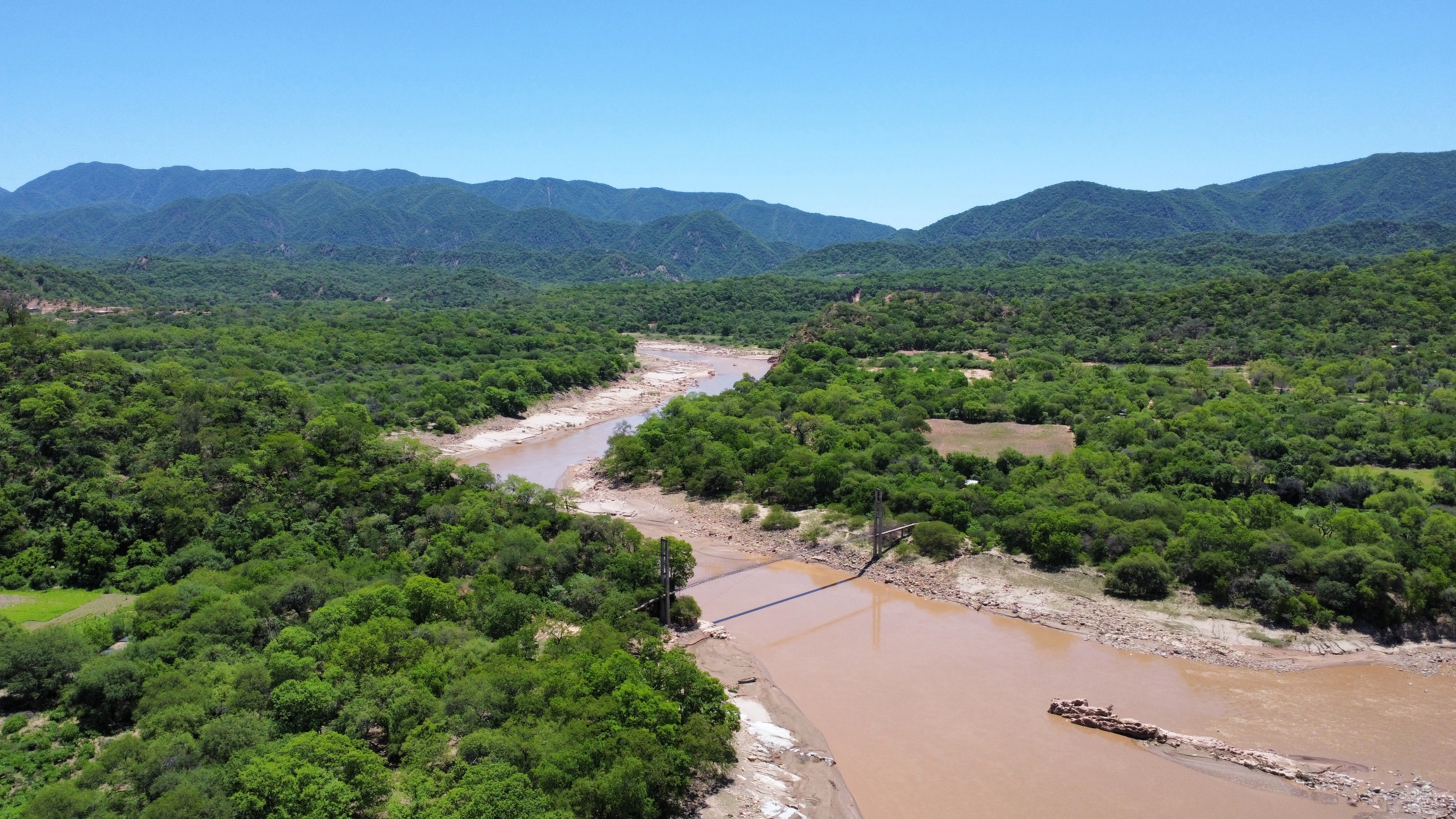
- Aguaragüe National Park and Integrated Management Natural Area

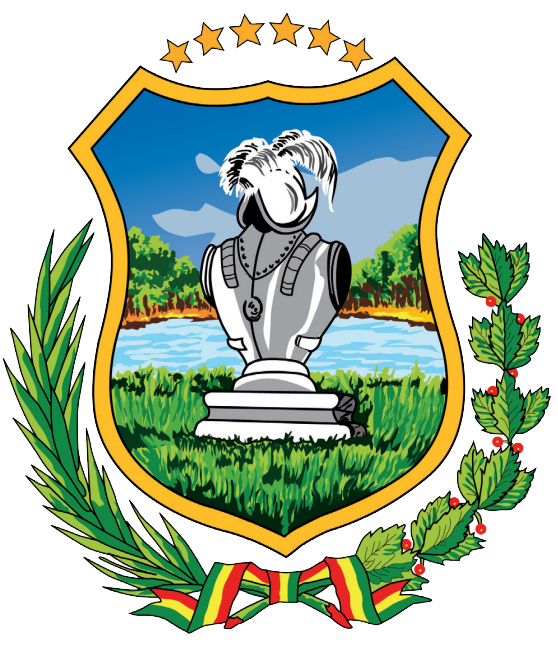
- Flag Coat of arms
- Motto: ¡La Muy Leal y Muy Fiel! (The very loyal and very faithful!)
- Anthem: Lyrics: Tomás O’Connor D'Arlach Music: Juan Fiori - starts with "Tarijeños la fama pregona...."
- Tarija in Bolivia
- Coordinates: 21°32′02″S 64°44′05″W
- Country: Bolivia
- Established: 4 July 1576
- Capital: Tarija

Government
  - Governor: Óscar Gerardo Montes Barzón (UNIR (Note: Unidos Para Renovar (United to renew) or UNIR, is a political party created in 2005 by current governor Óscar Montes Barzón, the ideologies that the party supports are autonomism-federalism, conservatism, reformism and centrism, its position in the political spectrum is the center.))
  - Lieutenant governor: Maya Soruco Urzagaste (UNIR)
  - Senators: Rodrigo Paz Pereira (CC-PG) (Note: Primero la Gente (First the People) or PG, is a political party created in April 2019 by former mayor Rodrigo Paz Pereira, the ideologies that the party supports are autonomism-federalism, reformism and centrism, its position on the political spectrum is center and center left.); Nely Verónica Gallo (CC); Miguel Ángel Rejas (MAS); Gladys Valentina Alarcón (MAS)

Area
  - Total: 37,623 km^{2} (14,526 sq mi)
  - % of Bolivia: 3.42 km^{2} (1.32 sq mi)

Population (2024)
  - Total: 534,348
  - Density: 14.203/km^{2} (36.785/sq mi)

Languages (speakers)
  - Spanish: 365,710
  - Quechua (migrants): 37,337
  - Aymara (migrants): 7,219
  - Guaraní: 4,578
- Time zone: UTC-4 (BOT)
- ISO 3166 code: BO-T
- Official language: Spanish, Guaraní, wichí-matacoa-weenhayek, tapieté
- GDP (2023): in constant currency of 2015
- Total: US$ 2.2 billion Int$ 5.2 billion (PPP)
- Per capita: US$ 3,600; Int$ 8,300 (PPP)
- HDI (2019): 0.741 high · 3rd of 9
- Provinces: 6
- Website: Department website

Tarija (Spanish pronunciation: [taˈɾixa]) is a department in Bolivia. It is located in south-eastern Bolivia bordering with Argentina to the south and Paraguay to the east. According to the 2024 census, it has a population of 534,348 inhabitants. It has an area of 37,623 km^{2} (14,526 sq mi). The city of Tarija is the capital of the department. The capital lies in a broad agricultural valley known as the Central Valley of Tarija which covers 5.5% of the surface area of the department.

== Subdivisions ==
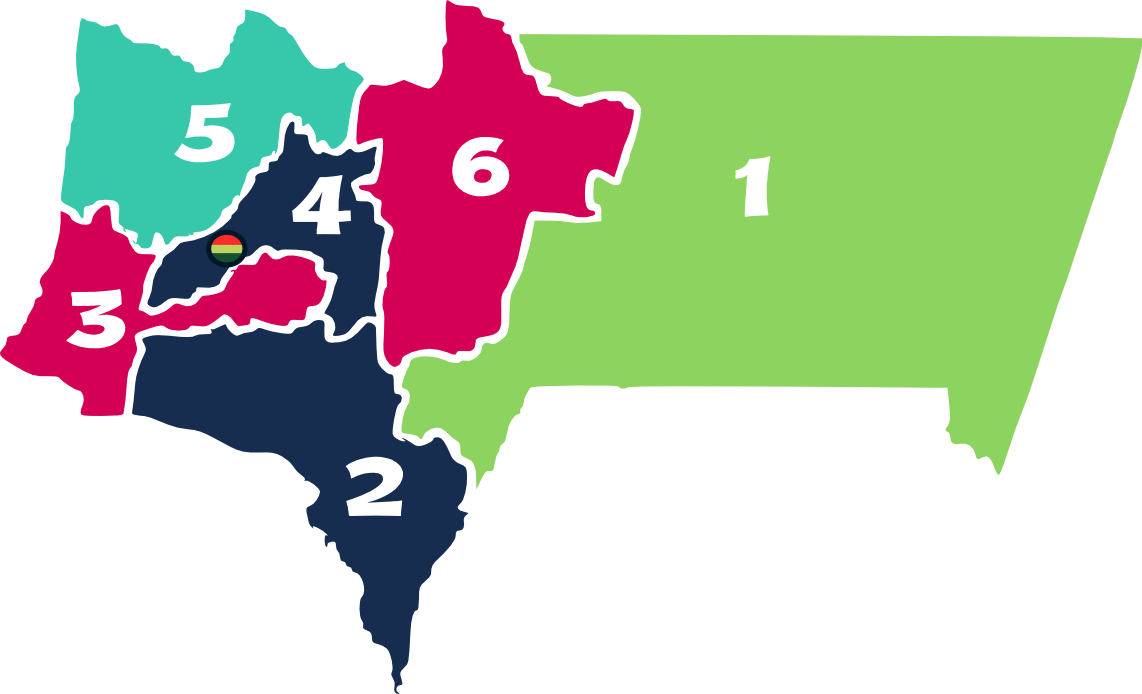
Provinces of Tarija

The department is divided into five provinces and one autonomous region:

1. Gran Chaco Province (autonomous region)
2. Aniceto Arce Province
3. José María Avilés Province
4. Cercado Province
5. Eustaquio Méndez Province
6. Burdett O'Connor Province

Notable places in Tarija include:

- Villamontes in the department's oil-producing eastern scrubland. Villamontes has recorded the hottest temperature ever in Bolivia, 45.7 °C (114.3 °F), several times, most recently on 29 October 2010.
- Bermejo, a border town adjoining Aguas Blancas, Argentina
- Yacuiba, a border town with Argentina.

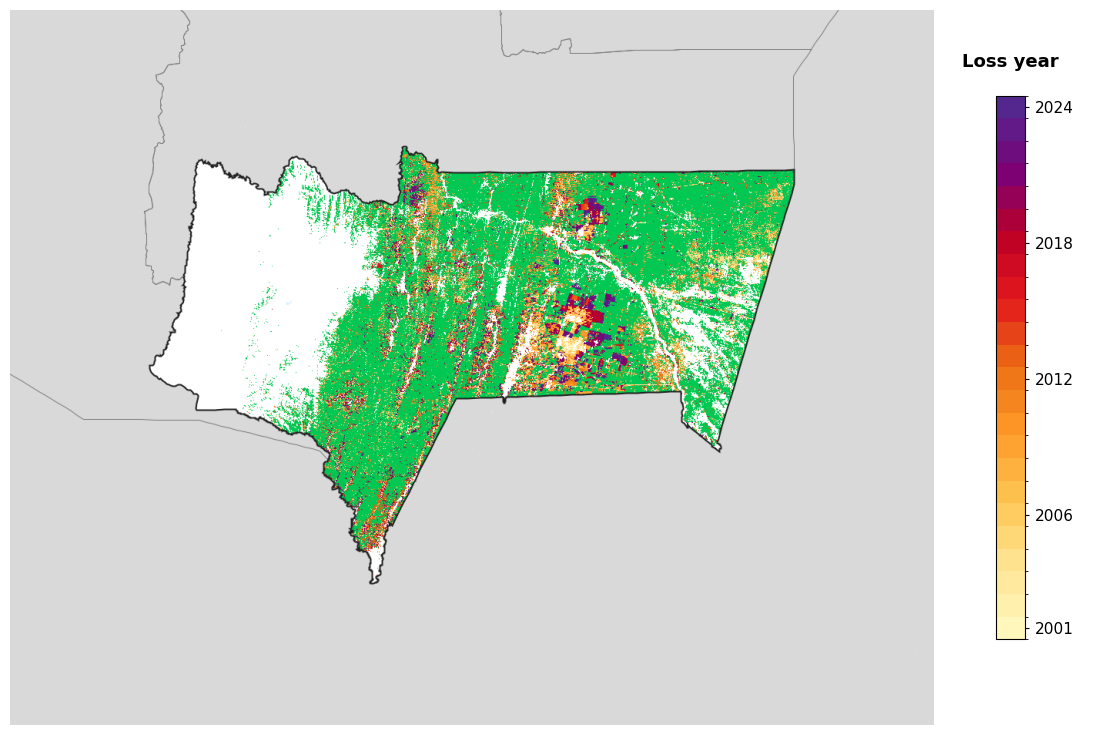
Tree-cover loss year in Tarija, 2001-2024, from the Global Forest Change dataset.

The Department of Tarija is renowned for its mild, pleasant climate, and comprises one of the country's foremost agricultural regions. Its citizens have traditionally felt close to, and conducted a lively international trade with, neighboring towns of northern Argentina. Between 1816 and 1898, the region was part of Argentina, and was ceded to Bolivia in exchange for Puna de Atacama.

Tarija boasts South America's second-largest natural gas reserves. Increased gas revenues and foreign direct investment in gas exploration and distribution are fueling growth and turning Tarija into Bolivia's next industrial hub. Political instability at the national level has hindered development of the reserves, as the region has chosen to align with pro-autonomy forces which aim at the devolution of considerable powers away from the central government in favor of the departments.

More than 20 different indigenous tribes, ranging in population from 20 persons up to 1500, live in the region. The Guaraní is the largest tribe.

Important battles and events related to the 1932-35 Chaco War with Paraguay took place in the department's eastern dry lands. Tarija was the home of Víctor Paz Estenssoro, leader of the 1952 Bolivian Revolution and four-time Constitutional President.

== Economy ==
The main economic activity is the wine industry. The land and climate are ideal for grape and wine production. The city of Tarija holds an annual Festival of Wine and Cheese.

The petroleum industry is important not only for the region but also for the country as a whole, especially the gas industry which is exported to Argentina and Brazil. The autonomous region of Gran Chaco is from where most of the gas is exploited.

== Demographics ==
Historical population
Year	Pop.	±% p.a.
1976	187,204	—
1992	291,407	+2.80%
2001	391,226	+3.33%
2012	483,518	+1.94%
2024	534,348	+0.84%
Source: Citypopulation

== Languages ==
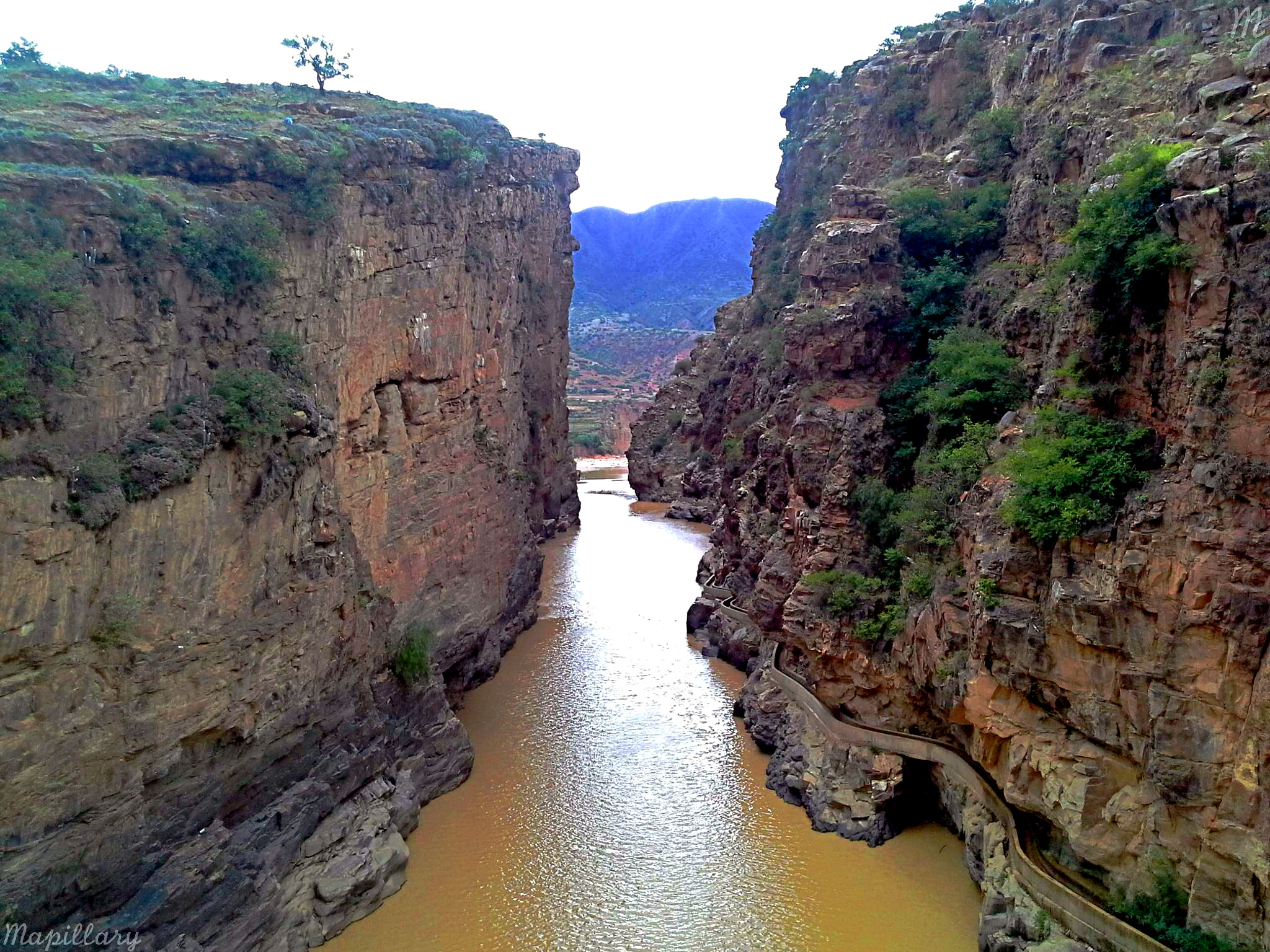
Angostura Canyon, Bolivia

The languages spoken in the department are mainly Spanish and Guaraní, with spoken by Quechua and Aymara migrants. The following table shows the numbers belonging to the recognized groups of speakers.

Language	Department	Bolivia
Spanish	365,710	6,821,626
Quechua	37,337	2,281,198
Aymara	7,219	1,525,321
Guaraní	4,578	62,575
Another native	2,468	49,432
Foreign	5,662	250,754
Only native	4,562	960,491
Native and Spanish	44,461	2,739,407
Spanish and foreign	322,098	4,115,751

== Places of interest ==
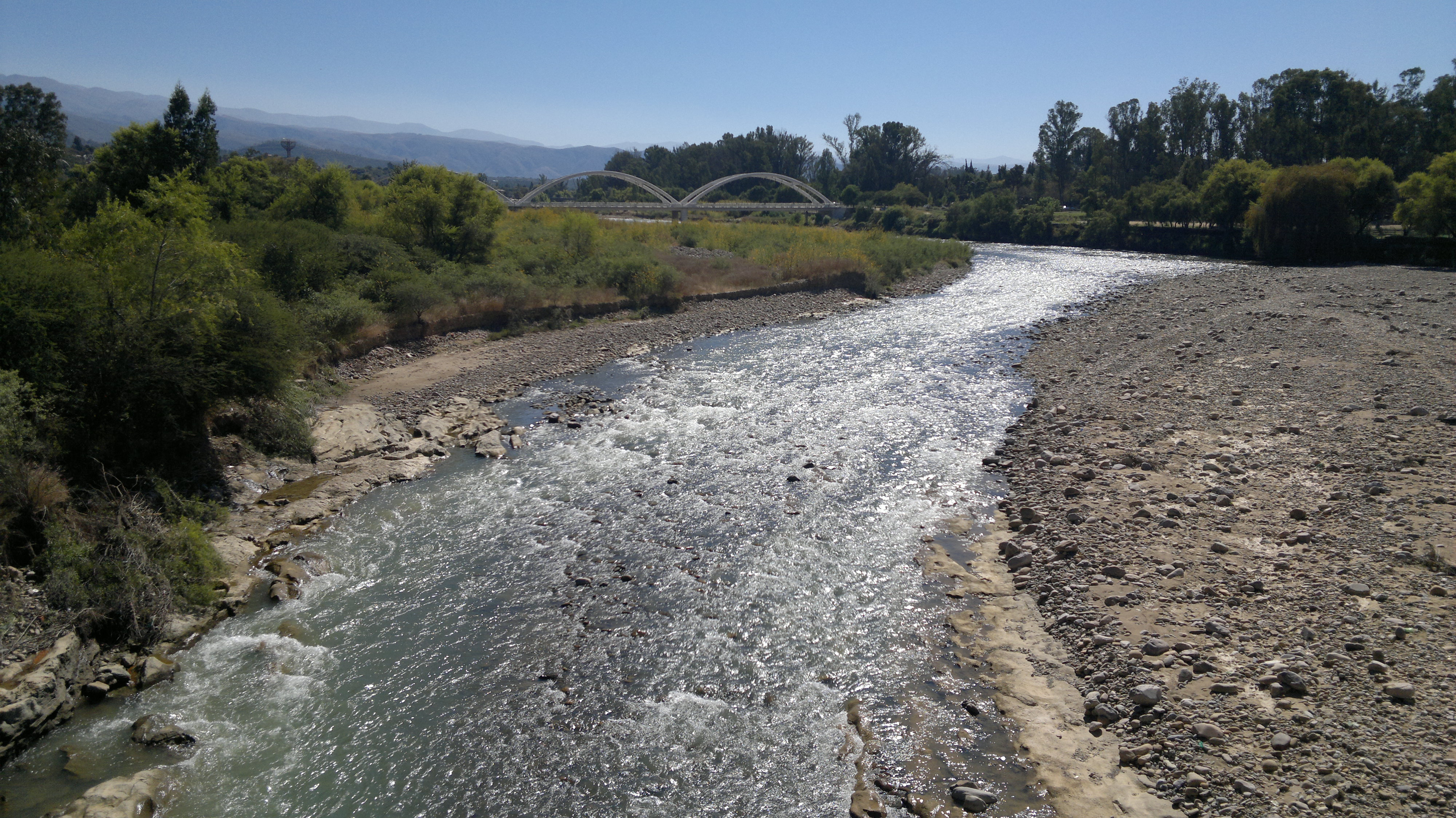
Nuevo Guadalquivir River near the city of Tarija

- Aguaragüe National Park and Integrated Management Natural Area
- Cordillera de Sama Biological Reserve
- Tariquía Flora and Fauna National Reserve

== See also ==
- Bolivian wine
