= Tucumilla Formation =

Geologic formation in Bolivia

- Stratigraphic range: Tremadocian; ~488–479 Ma
- Type: Geological formation

Lithology
- Primary: Sandstone
- Other: Shale, siltstone

Location
- Coordinates: 21.0°S 65.0°W
- Approximate paleocoordinates: 47.2°S 127.7°W
- Region: Tarija Department
- Country: Bolivia
- Tucumilla Formation (Bolivia)

The Tucumilla Formation is a Tremadocian geologic formation of southern Bolivia. The sandstones, shales and siltstones crop out in the José María Avilés and Eustaquio Méndez Provinces.

== Fossil content ==
The formation has provided the following fossils:

- Apheoorthis samensis
- Notorthisina notoconcha
- Angelina sp.
- Asaphellus sp.
- Broeggeria sp.
- Bucania sp.
- Dictyonema sp.
- Finkelnburgia sp.
- Jujuyaspis sp.
- Kainella sp.
- Leptoplastides sp.
- Micragnostus sp.
- Parabolina sp.
- Richardsonella sp.
- Shumardia sp.
- Tropidodiscus sp.

== See also ==
- List of fossiliferous stratigraphic units in Bolivia
