= Anzaldo Formation =

Ordovician geologic formation in Bolivia

- Stratigraphic range: Katian; ~460–446 Ma
- Type: Geological formation
- Unit of: Cochabamba Group
- Underlies: San Benito Formation
- Overlies: Capinota Formation

Lithology
- Primary: Sandstone

Location
- Coordinates: 17.8°S 65.8°W
- Approximate paleocoordinates: 45.1°S 127.5°W
- Region: Cochabamba Department
- Country: Bolivia
- Extent: Cordillera Oriental
- Anzaldo Formation (Bolivia)

The Anzaldo Formation is a Katian geologic formation of central Bolivia. The formation belongs to the Cochabamba Group, overlies the Capinota Formation and is overlain by the San Benito Formation. The formation is famous for being where Sacabambaspis, a jawless fish that has become a popular internet meme in recent years, was discovered.

== Fossil content ==
The formation has provided the following fossils:

=== Fish ===
Pteraspidomorphi

- Sacabambaspis janvieri

=== Trilobites ===
- Huemacaspis bistrami
- Leiostegina inexpectans

=== Bivalves ===
- ?Grammysia sp.
- ?Modiomorpha sp.
- ?Parallelodon sp.
- "Ctenodonta" sp.
- "Goniophorina" sp.

=== Gastropods ===
- Gyrospira tourteloti

=== Lingulida ===
- Bistramia elegans
- Dignomia munsterii

== See also ==
- List of fossiliferous stratigraphic units in Bolivia
- Cancañiri Formation
- La Ciénega Formation
- Santiago Formation
