= Iscayachi Formation =

Geologic formation in Bolivia

- Stratigraphic range: Tremadocian; ~488–479 Ma
- Type: Geological formation
- Thickness: 1,000 m (3,300 ft)

Lithology
- Primary: Shale, sandstone

Location
- Coordinates: 22.0°S 65.0°W
- Approximate paleocoordinates: 46.3°S 128.3°W
- Region: Potosí & Tarija Departments
- Country: Bolivia

Type section
- Named for: Iscayachi
- Iscayachi Formation (Bolivia)

The Iscayachi Formation, in older literature also referred to as Guanacuno Formation, is an extensive Tremadocian geologic formation of western and southern Bolivia. The shales and sandstones were deposited in a shallow marine to pro-delta environment. The formation reaches a thickness of 1,000 metres (3,300 ft).

== Fossil content ==
The formation has provided the following fossils:

- Akoldinoidia sinuosa
- Altiplanelaspis palquiensis
- Angelina hyeronimi, A. punctalineata
- Asaphellus communis, A. riojanas
- Deltacare prosops
- Conophrys erquensis
- Golasaphus palquiensis
- Jujuyaspis keideli
- Kainella andina, K. meridionalis
- Kvania lariensis
- Leptoplastides mariana
- Macrocystella bavarica
- Micragnostus hoeki
- Onychopyge branisai
- Parabolinella argentinensis, P. boliviana
- Pharostomina alvarezi, P. trapezoidalis
- Rhabdinopora flabelliformis
- Rhadinopleura incaica
- Rossaspis rossi
- Saltaspis steinmanni
- Shumardia erquensis
- Leptoplastides cf. granulosa
- Altiplanelaspis sp.
- Araiopleura sp.
- Broeggeria sp.
- Ctenodonta sp.
- Dictyonema sp.
- Koldinioidia sp.
- Leiostegium sp.
- Nanorthis sp.
- Onychopyge sp.
- Palquiella sp.
- Parabolina sp.
- Saltaspis sp.
- Sphaerocare sp.
- Trilobitarum sp.
- Tropidodiscus sp.

== See also ==
- List of fossiliferous stratigraphic units in Bolivia
