= List of fossiliferous stratigraphic units in Bolivia =

Fossiliferous stratigraphic units in Bolivia
Ensenadan-Lujanian
Pliocene
Late Miocene
Miocene
Petaca Formation
Salla Formation
Santa Lucía Formation
Cretaceous
La Puerta Formation
Tucurú Group
Permian
Devonian
Silurian
Ordovician

This is a list of fossiliferous stratigraphic units in Bolivia.

== List of fossiliferous stratigraphic units ==
| Group | Formation | Period | Notes |
|---|---|---|---|
| | Ñuapua Formation | Lujanian-Holocene | |
| | Tarija Formation | Ensenadan-Lujanian | |
| | Ulloma Formation | Ensenadan-Lujanian | |
| | Charana Formation | Uquian | |
| | Sacaba Formation | Uquian | |
| | Umala Formation | Montehermosan-Ensenadan | |
| | La Paz Formation | Montehermosan-Uquian | |
| | Casira Formation | Montehermosan-Chapadmalalan | |
| | Remedios Formation | Montehermosan | |
| | Solimões Formation | Huayquerian-Montehermosan | |
| | Muyu Huasi Formation | Huayquerian | |
| | Quehua Formation | Huayquerian | |
| | Mauri Formation | Colloncuran-Huayquerian | |
| Totora | Rosa Pata Formation | Late Miocene | |
| | Yecua Formation | Mayoan | |
| Honda | | Laventan | |
| | Choquecota Formation | Laventan | |
| | Cerdas beds | Colloncuran | |
| | Nazareno Formation | Colloncuran | |
| | Petaca Formation | Deseadan | |
| | Salla Formation | Deseadan | |
| | Cayara Formation | Casamayoran | |
| | Santa Lucía Formation | Maastrichtian-Danian (Tiupampan) | |
| Puca | El Molino Formation | Maastrichtian | |
| Puca | Toro Toro Formation | Late Campanian | |
| Puca | Chaunaca Formation | Campanian | |
| | Cajones Formation | Turonian-Santonian | |
| | Aroifilla Formation | Coniacian-Early Santonian | |
| | La Puerta Formation | Late Jurassic-Early Cretaceous | |
| | Tacurú | Late Triassic | |
| | Upper Chutani Formation | Kungurian | |
| | Copacabana Formation | Moscovian-Artinskian | |
| | Iquiri Formation | Eifelian-Frasnian | |
| | Cha-Kjeri Formation | Eifelian-Givetian | |
| | Huamampampa Formation | Pragian-Emsian | |
| | Los Monos Formation | Eifelian-Givetian | |
| | Sica Sica Formation | Eifelian | |
| | Belén Formation | Emsian | |
| | Gamoneda Formation | Emsian | |
| | Icla Formation | Pragian-Emsian | |
| | Santa Rosa Formation | Lochkovian | |
| | Vila Vila Formation | Lochkovian-Pragian | |
| | Catavi Formation | Pridoli-Emsian | |
| | Pampa Formation | Tremadocian-Eifelian | |
| | Lipeón Formation | Telychian-Pridoli | |
| | Kirusillas Formation | Homerian | |
| | Ananea Formation | Silurian | |
| | Llallagua Formation | Llandovery | |
| | Cancañiri Formation | Katian-Rhuddanian | |
| | La Ciénega Formation | Sandbian-Katian | |
| | Santiago Formation | Sandbian-Katian | |
| Cochabamba | San Benito Formation | Katian | |
| Cochabamba | Anzaldo Formation | Katian | |
| Cochabamba | Coroíco Formation | Darriwilian | |
| | Sella Formation | Dapingian-Darriwilian | |
| | Independencia Formation | Dapingian | |
| | San Lorenzo Formation | Dapingian | |
| | Obispo Formation | Dapingian | |
| | Pircancha Formation | Floian-Dapingian | |
| | Iscayachi Formation (formerly Guanacuno Formation) | Tremadocian | |
| | Tarija Concha Formation | Tremadocian | |
| | Tucumilla Formation | Tremadocian | |
| Mesón | Lizoite Formation | Tremadocian | |
| Mesón | Campanario Formation | Cambrian-Tremadocian | |
| Mesón | Chahualmayoc Formation | Cambrian | |
| | Puncoviscana Formation | Ediacaran-Cambrian | |

== See also ==
- Geology of Bolivia
- Gomphothere fossils in Bolivia
- South American land mammal ages
- List of fossiliferous stratigraphic units in Paraguay
- List of fossiliferous stratigraphic units in Peru
