= Tajzara Lake =

Lake in Tarija Department, Bolivia

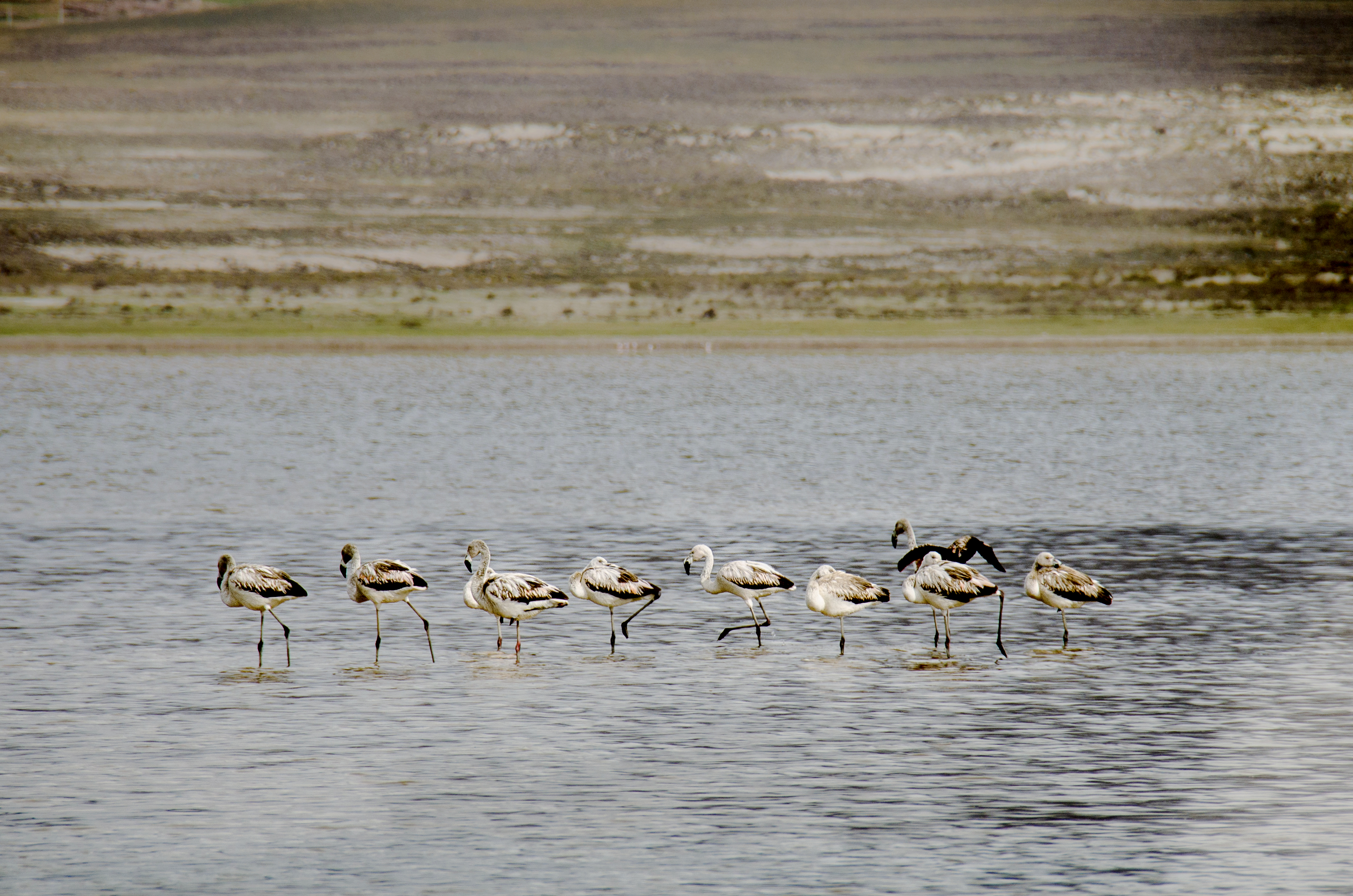
- Flamingos in Tajzara Lake

- Location within Bolivia Location within South America
- Interactive map of Tajzara Lake
- Location: Tarija Department, Bolivia
- Coordinates: 21°43′00″S 65°04′14″W
- Surface elevation: 14,000 ft (4,300 m)

Tajzara (pronounced Taxara in English) is a small region and lake on the arid Altiplano of Bolivia, located in the vicinity of Cordillera de Sama Biological Reserve, Yunchará, José María Avilés Province. Tarija Department, near the town of Iscayachi.

== Fauna and flora ==
While the surrounding land might appear rather undistinguished, it is one of the most biologically unique locations in the world. The name Taxara is also synonymous with the shallow lake that marks the center of the region. At about 14,000 feet above sea level, it is an extremely high lake. Another unusual characteristic is that it is a salt lake. Throughout the year, it bustles with many species of aquatic fowl, including three types of flamingo--the Chilean flamingo, the Andean flamingo, and the James's flamingo--which are drawn to the lake by its wide expanse of shallow plateaus abounding with algae that constitute the birds' primary food source. Since it is the only sizable body of water in the region, it often attracts species of bird that would usually not be found in such a region. Most species thrive off the seed that is provided by the arid grassland which characterizes the environment.

== See also ==
- Laguna Grande (Bolivia)
