= Cañón del Pilaya =

World's sixth deepest canyon, located in Bolivia

The Cañón del Pilaya is located south of Bolivia on the border between the departments of Tarija and Chuquisaca, separating the municipalities of San Lorenzo and Culpina. The Pilaya canyon has a depth of 3030 m and is listed as the sixth deepest canyon in the world.

The Yumasa community is one of the main gateways to visit this great natural attraction.
