= San Lorenzo Formation =

San Lorenzo Formation may refer to:

- San Lorenzo Formation, Bolivia, an Ordovician geologic formation in Bolivia
- San Lorenzo Formation, California, an Eocene to Miocene geologic formation in California
