= Cordillera de Sama Biological Reserve =

Protected area in Bolivia

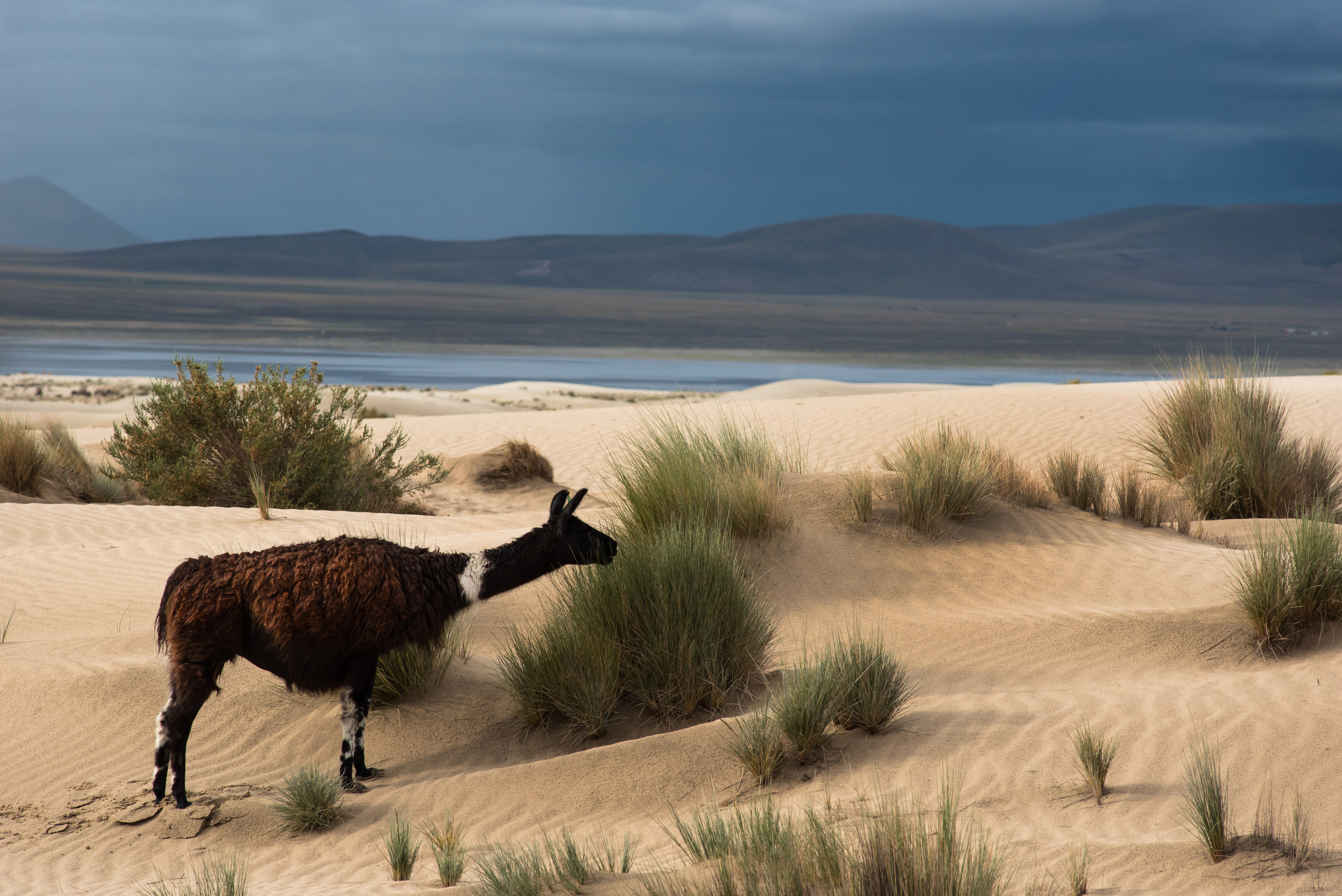

- Location within Bolivia
- Location: Tarija Department, Bolivia
- Coordinates: 21°37′S 64°55′W
- Area: 1,085 km^{2} (419 sq mi)
- Established: 1991
- Governing body: Servicio Nacional de Áreas Protegidas Values and conservation status Tajzara dunes It presents a particular scenic beauty from the marked altitudinal gradient and the presence of high Andean lagoons. There are sites of archeological value (aboriginal and indigenous ruins and cave paintings). The reserve can be a reservoir of a remarkable diversity of genetic resources, especially in relation to traditional agricultural products (tubers, corn). Threats to the area come mainly from overgrazing by sheep, uncontrolled burning, firewood extraction, especially from the Queñua relicts, bird guano extraction (lagoons), poaching of vicuña and waterfowl. One of the best known fires was produced in August 2017 due to a poorly extinguished campfire causing a fire that lasted 3 days devouring 14,000 hectares and claiming the lives of 3 people. The fire occurred in erquis ceibal and spread damaging the largest water reservoir which is the rincón de la victoria, also damaging one of the biggest tourist attractions which is San Pedro de Sola, not counting the loss of livestock Values and conservation status Tajzara dunes It presents a particular scenic beauty from the marked altitudinal gradient and the presence of high Andean lagoons. There are sites of archeological value (aboriginal and indigenous ruins and cave paintings). The reserve can be a reservoir of a remarkable diversity of genetic resources, especially in relation to traditional agricultural products (tubers, corn). Threats to the area come mainly from overgrazing by sheep, uncontrolled burning, firewood extraction, especially from the Queñua relicts, bird guano extraction (lagoons), poaching of vicuña and waterfowl. One of the best known fires was produced in August 2017 due to a poorly extinguished campfire causing a fire that lasted 3 days devouring 14,000 hectares and claiming the lives of 3 people. The fire occurred in erquis ceibal and spread damaging the largest water reservoir which is the rincón de la victoria, also damaging one of the biggest tourist attractions which is San Pedro de Sola, not counting the loss of livestock Climate perhumid climate zone semi-arid climate zone The region's climate varies from semi-arid to temperate, depending on the altitudinal variation. The rainfall varies from subhumid to perhumid in the areas with the greatest exposure to orographic rains and fog, in a range of approximately 300 to 800 mm per year. The altitude range oscillates between 4,600 and 1,800 meters above sea level. Climate perhumid climate zone semi-arid climate zone The region's climate varies from semi-arid to temperate, depending on the altitudinal variation. The rainfall varies from subhumid to perhumid in the areas with the greatest exposure to orographic rains and fog, in a range of approximately 300 to 800 mm per year. The altitude range oscillates between 4,600 and 1,800 meters above sea level. (SERNAP)

Cordillera de Sama Biological Reserve (Spanish: Reserva Biológica Cordillera de Sama) is a protected area in Bolivia located in the Tarija Department, in the Cercado Province, Eustaquio Méndez Province, and José María Avilés Province. It protects part of the Central Andean puna and Bolivian montane dry forests ecoregions.

== See also ==
- Laguna Grande
- Tajzara Lake
- Baritú National Park
