= Santiago Formation =

Santiago Formation may refer to:

- Santiago Formation, Bolivia, a Late Ordovician geologic formation of Bolivia
- Santiago Formation, California, a Late Eocene to Late Oligocene geologic formation of California
- Santiago Formation, Chiapas, a Late Jurassic to Early Cretaceous geologic formation in Chiapas, Mexico
- Santiago Formation, Oaxaca, a Carboniferous geologic formation in Oaxaca, Mexico
- Santiago Formation, Panama, a Late Oligocene geologic formation of Panama
