= Óscar Alfaro =

Óscar Alfaro may refer to:

- Óscar Alfaro (footballer) (1904–1939), Chilean footballer
- Óscar Alfaro (poet) (1921–1963), Bolivian writer, poet, teacher, and journalist
