= Independencia Formation =

Geologic formation in Bolivia

- Stratigraphic range: Dapingian; ~478–466 Ma
- Type: Geological formation

Lithology
- Primary: Schist, phyllite

Location
- Coordinates: 17.0°S 67.0°W
- Approximate paleocoordinates: 47.9°S 123.9°W
- Region: Cochabamba Department
- Country: Bolivia

Type section
- Named for: Independencia
- Independencia Formation (Bolivia)

The Independencia Formation is a Dapingian geologic formation of western-central Bolivia. The dark to bluish gray schists and phyllites (metamorphosed shales) were deposited in an open marine environment.

== Fossil content ==
The formation has provided the following fossils:

- Didymograptellus protobifidus
- Phyllograptus anna
- Pseudophyllograptus angustifolius
- Notopeltis sp.
- Michelinoceras sp.

== See also ==
- List of fossiliferous stratigraphic units in Bolivia
