= Cha-Kjeri Formation =

Geologic formation in Bolivia

- Stratigraphic range: Eifelian; ~392–384 Ma
- Type: Geological formation
- Sub-units: Purple Sandstone member

Lithology
- Primary: Sandstone

Location
- Coordinates: 19.2°S 64.9°W
- Approximate paleocoordinates: 69.6°S 85.8°W
- Region: Chuquisaca Department
- Country: Bolivia
- Extent: Cordillera Oriental
- Cha-Kjeri Formation (Bolivia)

The Cha-Kjeri Formation is an Eifelian geologic formation of central Bolivia. The formation comprises red sandstones deposited in a marine environment.

== Fossil content ==
The formation has provided fossils of Globithyris aff. diana.

== See also ==
- List of fossiliferous stratigraphic units in Bolivia
