= Thysanopyge =

Thysanopyge Temporal range: Early Arenig ~478–450 Ma

Scientific classification
- Domain: Eukaryota
- Kingdom: Animalia
- Phylum: Arthropoda
- Class: †Trilobita
- Order: †Asaphida
- Family: †Asaphidae
- Genus: †Thysanopyge; Kayser 1898

Species
- T. argentina Kayser 1898 (type); T. clavijoi Harrington & Leanza 1957; T. latelimbata Harrington & Leanza 1957

Extinct genus of trilobites

Thysanopyge is an extinct genus from a well-known class of fossil marine arthropods, the trilobites. It lived in what is now South America during the early part of the Arenig stage of the Ordovician Period, a faunal stage which lasted from approximately 478 to 471 million years ago.

== Distribution ==
Fossils of Thysanopyge have been found in:

Argentina

- Acoite Formation
- Las Aguaditas Formation
- Santa Rosita Formation

Bolivia

- Obispo Formation
- San Lorenzo Formation
