= Darriwilian =

Second and last age of the Middle Ordovician epoch

- 469.4 ± 0.9 – 458.2 ± 0.7 Ma
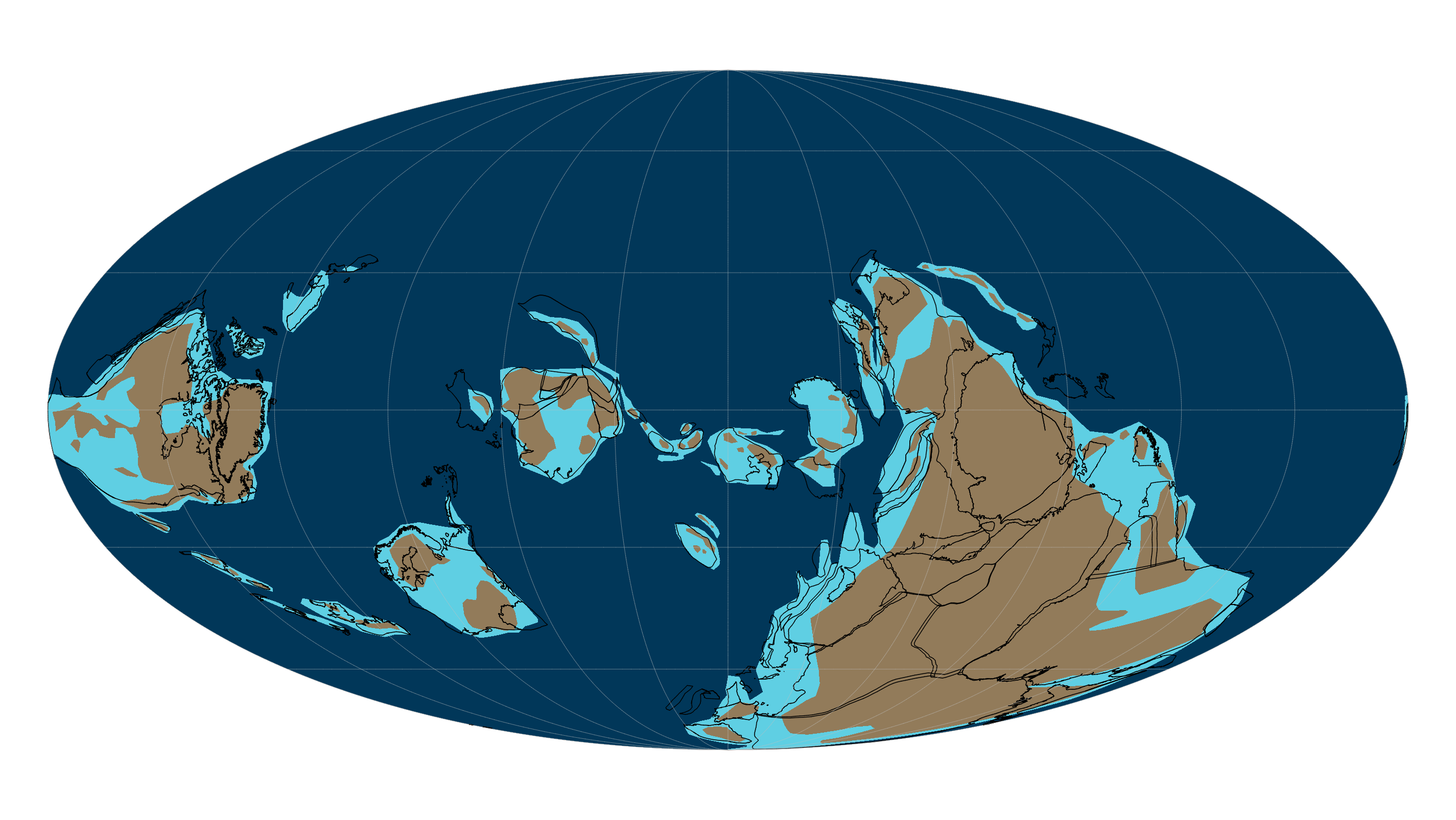
- Earth during the late Darriwilian stage (460 Ma)

Chronology
← / First land plant spores; ← / Ordovician meteor event
Subdivision of the Ordovician according to the ICS, as of 2024. Vertical axis scale: Millions of years ago

Etymology
- Name formality: Formal

Usage information
- Celestial body: Earth
- Regional usage: Global (ICS)
- Time scale(s) used: ICS Time Scale

Definition
- Chronological unit: Age
- Stratigraphic unit: Stage
- Time span formality: Formal
- Lower boundary definition: FAD of the Graptolite Undulograptus austrodentatus
- Lower boundary GSSP: Huangnitang Section, Huangnitang Village, Changshan, Zhejiang, China; 28.8539°N 118.4897°E
- Lower GSSP ratified: 1997
- Upper boundary definition: FAD of the Graptolite Nemagraptus gracilis
- Upper boundary GSSP: Fågelsång section, Sularp Brook, Skåne, Sweden; 55.7137°N 13.3255°E
- Upper GSSP ratified: 2002

The Darriwilian is the upper stage of the Middle Ordovician. It is preceded by the Dapingian and succeeded by the Upper Ordovician Sandbian Stage. The lower boundary of the Darriwilian is defined as the first appearance of the graptolite species Undulograptus austrodentatus around 469.4 million years ago. It lasted for about 10.8 million years until the beginning of the Sandbian around 458.2 million years ago. This stage of the Ordovician was marked by the beginning of the Andean-Saharan glaciation.

== Naming ==
The name Darriwilian is derived from Darriwil, a parish in County of Grant, Victoria, Australia. The name was proposed in 1899 by Thomas Sergeant Hall.

== GSSP ==
Map of China showing the GSSP location.

The GSSP of the Darriwilian is the Huangnitang Section (28.8539°N 118.4897°E) near the village Huangnitang, 3.5 km (2.2 mi) southwest of Changshan County Town (Zhejiang, China). It is an outcrop of the Ningkuo Formation, consisting of mainly black shale. The lower boundary of the Darriwilian is defined as the first appearance datum of the graptolite species Undulograptus austrodentatus in that section.

A secondary fossil marker is the graptolite Arienigraptus zhejiangensis.

== Biostratigraphy ==
The base of the Darriwilian is also the base of the Undulograptus austrodentatus graptolite zone. This zone lies just above the North Atlantic Microzarkodina parva conodont zone. The base also lies in the upper part of the North American Histiodella altifrons conodont zone.

The Undulograptus austrodentatus graptolite zone is known from outcrops around the world, making the base of the Darriwilian easily correlatable.

== Regional stages ==
The Darriwilian overlaps with the upper Arenig and the Llanvirn. The base of the Darriwilian can be correlated with a level in the Fennian stage of the Arenig.
