= Vila Vila Formation =

Geologic formation in Bolivia

- Stratigraphic range: Lochkovian-Pragian; ~416–409 Ma
- Type: Geological formation

Lithology
- Primary: Sandstone
- Other: Shale

Location
- Coordinates: 15.5°S 68.0°W
- Approximate paleocoordinates: 60.1°S 100.4°W
- Region: La Paz Department
- Country: Bolivia
- Extent: Cordillera Oriental

Type section
- Named for: Vila Vila
- Vila Vila Formation (Bolivia)

The Vila Vila Formation is an Early Devonian (Lochkovian to Pragian) geologic formation of northern Bolivia. The formation comprises a succession of fine-grained sandstones and shales deposited in a shallow to deep marine environment.

== Fossil content ==
The formation has provided the following fossils:

- Pleurothyrella sp.
- Scaphiocoelia sp.

== See also ==
- List of fossiliferous stratigraphic units in Bolivia
