= Tarija Concha Formation =

Geologic formation of southern Bolivia

- Stratigraphic range: Tremadocian; ~488–479 Ma
- Type: Geological formation

Lithology
- Primary: Shale, siltstone

Location
- Coordinates: 21.0°S 65.0°W
- Approximate paleocoordinates: 47.2°S 127.7°W
- Region: Tarija Department
- Country: Bolivia

Type section
- Named for: Tarija
- Tarija Concha Formation (Bolivia)

The Tarija Concha Formation is a Tremadocian geologic formation of southern Bolivia. The shales and siltstones were deposited in a shallow marine environment.

== Fossil content ==
The formation has provided the following fossils:

- Bienvillia tetragonalis
- Leptoplastides granulosus
- Apatokephalus sp.

== See also ==
- List of fossiliferous stratigraphic units in Bolivia
