= Kirusillas Formation =

Geologic formation in Bolivia

- Stratigraphic range: Homerian; ~426–423 Ma
- Type: Geological formation
- Underlies: Pampa & Guayabillas Formations
- Overlies: Llallagua Formation

Lithology
- Primary: Black shale

Location
- Coordinates: 17.8°S 64.8°W
- Approximate paleocoordinates: 52.8°S 121.7°W
- Region: Cochabamba & Potosí Departments
- Country: Bolivia
- Extent: Cordillera Central & Oriental

Type section
- Named for: Kirusillas
- Kirusillas Formation (Bolivia)

The Kirusillas Formation is a Homerian geologic formation of central Bolivia. The formation comprises black shales, overlies the Llallagua Formation and is overlain by the Pampa and Guayabillas Formations. The Kirusillas Formation is laterally equivalent to the Lipeón Formation. The formation is a potential source rock for shale oil and shale gas.

== Fossil content ==
The formation has provided the following fossils:

- Ornatosinuitina reyesi
- Slimonia boliviana
- Styliolina sp.
- Lingulata indet.

== See also ==
- List of fossiliferous stratigraphic units in Bolivia
  - Lipeón Formation
