= Canasmoro =

- Town
- Location within Bolivia
- Coordinates: 21°21′S 64°45′W
- Country: Bolivia
- Department: Tarija Department
- Province: Eustaquio Méndez Province
- Municipality: San Lorenzo Municipality
- Elevation: 6,827 ft (2,081 m)

Population (2012)
  - Total: 1,156
- Time zone: UTC-4 (BOT)

Canasmoro is a town in the Tarija Department of Bolivia.

== Climate ==
Climate data for Canasmoro, elevation 2,080 m (6,820 ft)
Month	Jan	Feb	Mar	Apr	May	Jun	Jul	Aug	Sep	Oct	Nov	Dec	Year
Mean daily maximum °C (°F)	27.0 (80.6)	26.5 (79.7)	26.1 (79.0)	25.3 (77.5)	24.7 (76.5)	23.6 (74.5)	22.9 (73.2)	24.8 (76.6)	26.4 (79.5)	27.2 (81.0)	28.8 (83.8)	27.4 (81.3)	25.9 (78.6)
Daily mean °C (°F)	20.2 (68.4)	19.9 (67.8)	19.2 (66.6)	17.5 (63.5)	15.2 (59.4)	13.2 (55.8)	12.3 (54.1)	14.4 (57.9)	16.5 (61.7)	18.3 (64.9)	20.5 (68.9)	20.1 (68.2)	17.3 (63.1)
Mean daily minimum °C (°F)	13.4 (56.1)	13.2 (55.8)	12.3 (54.1)	9.5 (49.1)	5.5 (41.9)	2.8 (37.0)	1.9 (35.4)	4.3 (39.7)	6.9 (44.4)	9.6 (49.3)	12.4 (54.3)	12.7 (54.9)	8.7 (47.7)
Average precipitation mm (inches)	127.8 (5.03)	110.0 (4.33)	91.5 (3.60)	19.7 (0.78)	4.7 (0.19)	0.7 (0.03)	1.6 (0.06)	2.8 (0.11)	7.1 (0.28)	28.2 (1.11)	57.0 (2.24)	114.2 (4.50)	565.3 (22.26)
Average precipitation days	12.6	12.7	11.5	3.8	1.1	0.4	0.5	0.9	2.0	5.8	8.3	11.5	71.1
Average relative humidity (%)	71.2	71.2	70.4	66.1	59.2	55.2	52.2	50.1	53.9	59.9	64.1	65.8	61.6
Source: Servicio Nacional de Meteorología e Hidrología de Bolivia

Climate data for Trancas, elevation 2,200 m (7,200 ft), (1984–2015)
Month	Jan	Feb	Mar	Apr	May	Jun	Jul	Aug	Sep	Oct	Nov	Dec	Year
Mean daily maximum °C (°F)	25.6 (78.1)	25.1 (77.2)	25.0 (77.0)	25.2 (77.4)	24.7 (76.5)	25.3 (77.5)	24.1 (75.4)	26.0 (78.8)	26.4 (79.5)	27.0 (80.6)	26.8 (80.2)	26.6 (79.9)	25.7 (78.2)
Daily mean °C (°F)	19.6 (67.3)	19.2 (66.6)	19.2 (66.6)	17.9 (64.2)	15.8 (60.4)	15.3 (59.5)	14.1 (57.4)	16.0 (60.8)	17.2 (63.0)	19.2 (66.6)	19.6 (67.3)	20.1 (68.2)	17.8 (64.0)
Mean daily minimum °C (°F)	13.6 (56.5)	13.3 (55.9)	13.5 (56.3)	10.6 (51.1)	6.9 (44.4)	5.3 (41.5)	4.2 (39.6)	6.0 (42.8)	8.0 (46.4)	11.5 (52.7)	12.4 (54.3)	13.6 (56.5)	9.9 (49.8)
Average precipitation mm (inches)	188.4 (7.42)	159.5 (6.28)	122.2 (4.81)	27.2 (1.07)	5.5 (0.22)	1.1 (0.04)	0.4 (0.02)	3.0 (0.12)	10.3 (0.41)	48.3 (1.90)	88.6 (3.49)	147.8 (5.82)	802.3 (31.6)
Average precipitation days	15.6	15.0	11.8	5.4	2.0	0.5	0.5	1.0	2.6	6.8	9.8	13.0	84
Source: Servicio Nacional de Meteorología e Hidrología de Bolivia
