= San Benito Formation, Bolivia =

Geologic formation in Bolivia

San Benito Formation
- Stratigraphic range: Katian; ~460–446 Ma
- Type: Geological formation
- Unit of: Cochabamba Group
- Underlies: Cancañiri Formation
- Overlies: Anzaldo Formation
- Thickness: 500 m (1,600 ft)

Lithology
- Primary: Sandstone, siltstone
- Other: Shale

Location
- Coordinates: 17.0°S 66.0°W
- Approximate paleocoordinates: 45.6°S 126.6°W
- Region: Cochabamba Department
- Country: Bolivia
- Extent: Cordillera Oriental

Type section
- Named for: Cerro San Benito
- San Benito Formation, Bolivia (Bolivia)

The San Benito Formation is a Katian geologic formation of central Bolivia. The formation belongs to the Cochabamba Group, overlies the Anzaldo Formation and is overlain by the Cancañiri Formation. The 500 metres (1,600 ft) thick formation comprises a succession of shallow water quartzitic sandstones with minor interbeds of dark grey micaceous siltstones. Shelly fossils have been found at few horizons and consist mainly of linguliformean brachiopods, bivalves, and a few homalonotid trilobite remains. Poorly preserved graptolites occur occasionally in the shaly beds.

== Fossil content ==
The formation has provided the following fossils:

- Desmochitina minor
- Rafinesquina pseudoloricata
- Tunariorthis cardocanalis
- Villosacapsula setosapellicula
- Ancyrochitina cf. ancyrea
- Hirnantia cf. transgrediens
- Rhabdochitina cf. magna
- Bistramia sp.
- Ctenodonta sp.
- Lingula sp.

== See also ==
- List of fossiliferous stratigraphic units in Bolivia
