= La Ciénega Formation, Bolivia =

Geologic formation in Bolivia

La Ciénega Formation
- Stratigraphic range: Sandbian-Katian; ~460–450 Ma
- Type: Geological formation

Lithology
- Primary: Sandstone
- Other: Shale

Location
- Coordinates: 19.0°S 65.0°W
- Approximate paleocoordinates: 44.6°S 129.3°W
- Region: Chuquisaca Department
- Country: Bolivia
- Extent: Cordillera Oriental
- La Ciénega Formation, Bolivia (Bolivia)

La Ciénega Formation is a Sandbian to Katian geologic formation of south-central Bolivia. The formation comprises silty, clayey, micaceous, fine-grained sandstones with thin intercalations of grey-green to light grey shales.

== Fossil content ==
The formation has provided the following fossils:

- Dinorthis sp.
- Lingula sp.
- Lingulepis sp.
- Orbiculoidea sp.
- Orthoceras sp.

== See also ==
- List of fossiliferous stratigraphic units in Bolivia
