= Lipeón Formation =

Geologic formation in Bolivia and Argentina

- Stratigraphic range: Homerian; ~426–423 Ma
- Type: Geological formation
- Underlies: Baritú Formation

Lithology
- Primary: Sandstone
- Other: Siltstone

Location
- Coordinates: 17.8°S 64.8°W
- Approximate paleocoordinates: 52.8°S 121.7°W
- Region: Tarija Department; Jujuy Province
- Country: Bolivia; Argentina
- Extent: Oriental
- Lipeón Formation (Bolivia)

The Lipeón Formation is a Telychian to Pridoli geologic formation of southern Bolivia and northwestern Argentina. The formation comprises sandstones and siltstones. Plant fossils comprising rhyniophytes (specifically Aberlemnia, Steganotheca, Tarrantia, Hostinella and Cooksonia) are scattered throughout, with some abundant concentrations on micaceous bedding plains. The fossil flora is the oldest of South America. Also present were quite diverse small, irregularly branching fragments possibly the tips of algae such as Buthotrephis or Hungerfordia.

== Correlations ==
The Lipeón Formation is laterally equivalent to the Kirusillas Formation. The formation is a potential source rock for shale oil and shale gas.

== Fossil content ==
The formation has provided the following fossils:

- Ornatosinuitina reyesi
- Slimonia boliviana
- Styliolina sp.
- Lingulata indet.

Flora

- Aberlemnia
- Cooksonia
- Hostinella
- Steganotheca
- Tarrantia

== See also ==
- List of fossiliferous stratigraphic units in Bolivia
  - Kirusillas Formation
  - Llallagua Formation
