= Óscar Alfaro (poet) =

Writer

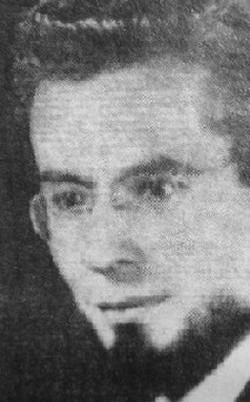
- Born: Óscar Gonzáles Alfaro; September 5, 1921; San Lorenzo, Bolivia
- Died: December 25, 1963 (aged 42); La Paz, Bolivia
- Occupation: Poet, Teacher, Journalist

Óscar Gonzáles Alfaro, known as Óscar Alfaro, (San Lorenzo, September 5, 1921 - December 25, 1963) was a Bolivian writer, poet, teacher, and journalist, who was distinguished by his dedication to children's and youth literature. He is best known for his children's books.

== Biography ==
He studied law at the Universidad Mayor de San Simón in Cochabamba, although it did not conclude it. He was a teacher of Spanish and literature at the Normal Canasmoro (Superior College of Formation of Teachers Juan Misael Saracho) in San Lorenzo and other various schools and institutes of Tarija and La Paz.

He was the producer of the program La República de los Niños (The Children's Republic) in Radio Illimani, and wrote columns in various newspapers. In La Paz, he belonged to the literary group Gesta Barbara (second generation).

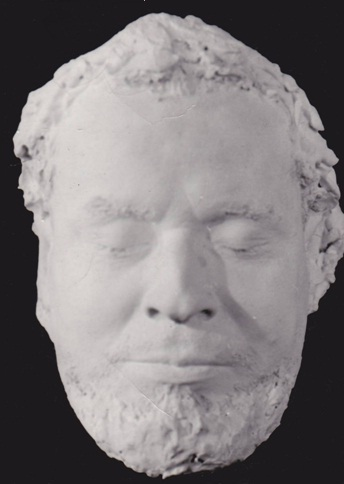
Death mask of Alfaro

Militant of the Communist Party of Bolivia, was the partner of Nilo Soruco, a singer-songwriter who acclaim many of their poems. Different composers have put music to his verses. The social concerns of the author and his effort to capture the customs and lifestyles of Bolivia characterize his work.

Some of his poems were translated into different languages— particularly into German, Esperanto, French, English, Portuguese and Russian; El cuento de las estrellas (The story of the stars) was published in Russia in 1984.

After the death of Alfaro, his widow, the teacher Fanny Mendizábal, was responsible for continuing the diffusion of his work.

There are many schools and educational establishments in Bolivia that bear the name of Óscar Alfaro. His poems and stories are studied in schools.

== Works ==
- Canciones de lluvia y tierra (1948)
- Bajo el sol de Tarija, poetry (1949)
- Cajita de música, poetry (1949)
- Alfabeto de estrellas, poetry (1950)
- Cien poemas para niños, poetry (1955)
- Cuentos infantiles, short stories (1962)
- La escuela de fiesta, civics poems (1963)
