= List of fossiliferous stratigraphic units in Paraguay =

Fossiliferous stratigraphic units in Paraguay
General Bruguer/Riacho Negro
Misiones Formation
San Miguel Formation
Cariy Sandstone
Eusebio Ayala Formation
Tagatiya Guazu Formation

This is a list of fossiliferous stratigraphic units in Paraguay.

== List of fossiliferous stratigraphic units ==
Group	Formation	Period	Notes
General Bruguer/Riacho Negro		Pleistocene	
	Misiones Formation	Aptian	
Independencia	San Miguel Formation	Artinskian	
	Cariy Sandstone	Telychian	
	Vargas Peña Shale	Llandovery	
Itacurubi	Eusebio Ayala Formation or Ayala Sandstone	Hirnantian	
Itapucumi	Tagatiya Guazu Formation	Ediacaran	

== See also ==
- Geology of Paraguay
- South American land mammal age
- Gomphothere fossils in Paraguay
- List of fossiliferous stratigraphic units in Bolivia
