= Obispo Formation, Bolivia =

Geologic formation in southern Bolivia

Obispo Formation
- Stratigraphic range: Dapingian; ~478–466 Ma
- Type: Geological formation

Lithology
- Primary: Shale, siltstone

Location
- Coordinates: 21.0°S 65.0°W
- Approximate paleocoordinates: 45.3°S 129.1°W
- Region: Tarija Department
- Country: Bolivia
- Obispo Formation, Bolivia (Bolivia)

The Obispo Formation is a Dapingian geologic formation of southern Bolivia. The shales and siltstones were deposited in an open marine environment.

== Fossil content ==
The formation has provided the following fossils:

- Camerella sp.
- Ceratiocaris sp.
- Didymograptus sp.
- Dinorthis sp.
- Endoceras sp.
- Euorthisina sp.
- Hoekaspis sp.
- Hypermecaspis sp.
- Incorthis sp.
- Megistaspis sp.
- Niobides sp.
- Orthis sp.
- Orthoceras sp.
- Pachendoceras sp.
- Thysanopyge sp.

== See also ==
- List of fossiliferous stratigraphic units in Bolivia
