= Llallagua Formation =

Geologic formation in Bolivia

- Stratigraphic range: Rhuddanian-Homerian; ~443–428 Ma
- Type: Geological formation
- Underlies: Kirusillas Formation

Lithology
- Primary: Sandstone
- Other: Shale

Location
- Coordinates: 17.8°S 64.8°W
- Approximate paleocoordinates: 46.5°S 127.9°W
- Region: Potosí Department
- Country: Bolivia
- Extent: Cordillera Oriental

Type section
- Named for: Llallagua
- Llallagua Formation (Bolivia)

The Llallagua Formation is a Rhuddanian to Homerian geologic formation of western Bolivia. The formation comprises siliciclastic sedimentary rocks. The fossil fauna suggests a warm water, nearshore current was active allowing northern hemisphere benthos to exist in the formation.

== Fossil content ==
The formation has provided the following fossils:

- Atrypa reticularis
- Leptaena rhomboidalis
- Orthostrophia cf. dartae
- Chonetes sp.
- Dalejina sp.
- Dalmanites sp.
- Orthostrophella sp.
- Plectodonta sp.
- Protochonetes sp.
- Syntrophia sp.

== See also ==
- List of fossiliferous stratigraphic units in Bolivia
  - Lipeón Formation
