= Iquiri Formation =

Geologic formation in Bolivia

- Stratigraphic range: Eifelian-Frasnian; ~392–377 Ma
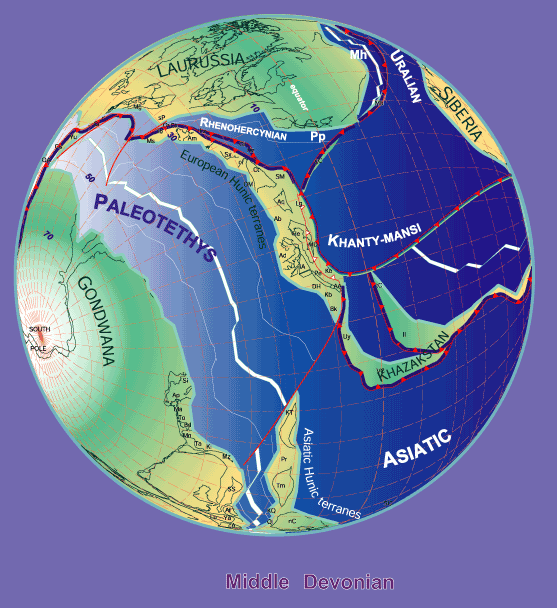
- Paleogeography of the Late Devonian (380 Ma) when Bolivia was part of Gondwana
- Type: Geological formation
- Underlies: Saipurú Formation
- Overlies: Los Monos Formation

Lithology
- Primary: Black shale
- Other: Sandstone

Location
- Coordinates: 18.0°S 65.0°W
- Approximate paleocoordinates: 69.8°S 78.6°W
- Region: Cochabamba Department
- Country: Bolivia
- Extent: Cordillera Oriental
- Iquiri Formation (Bolivia)

The Iquiri Formation is an Eifelian to Frasnian geologic formation of central Bolivia. The formation comprises black shales and sandstones.

== Fossil content ==
The formation has provided fossils of Proteolobus walli.

== See also ==
- List of fossiliferous stratigraphic units in Bolivia
