= Cercado Province (Tarija) =

Province in Tarija, Bolivia

Coordinates: 21°30′S 64°40′W

Cercado
- Province
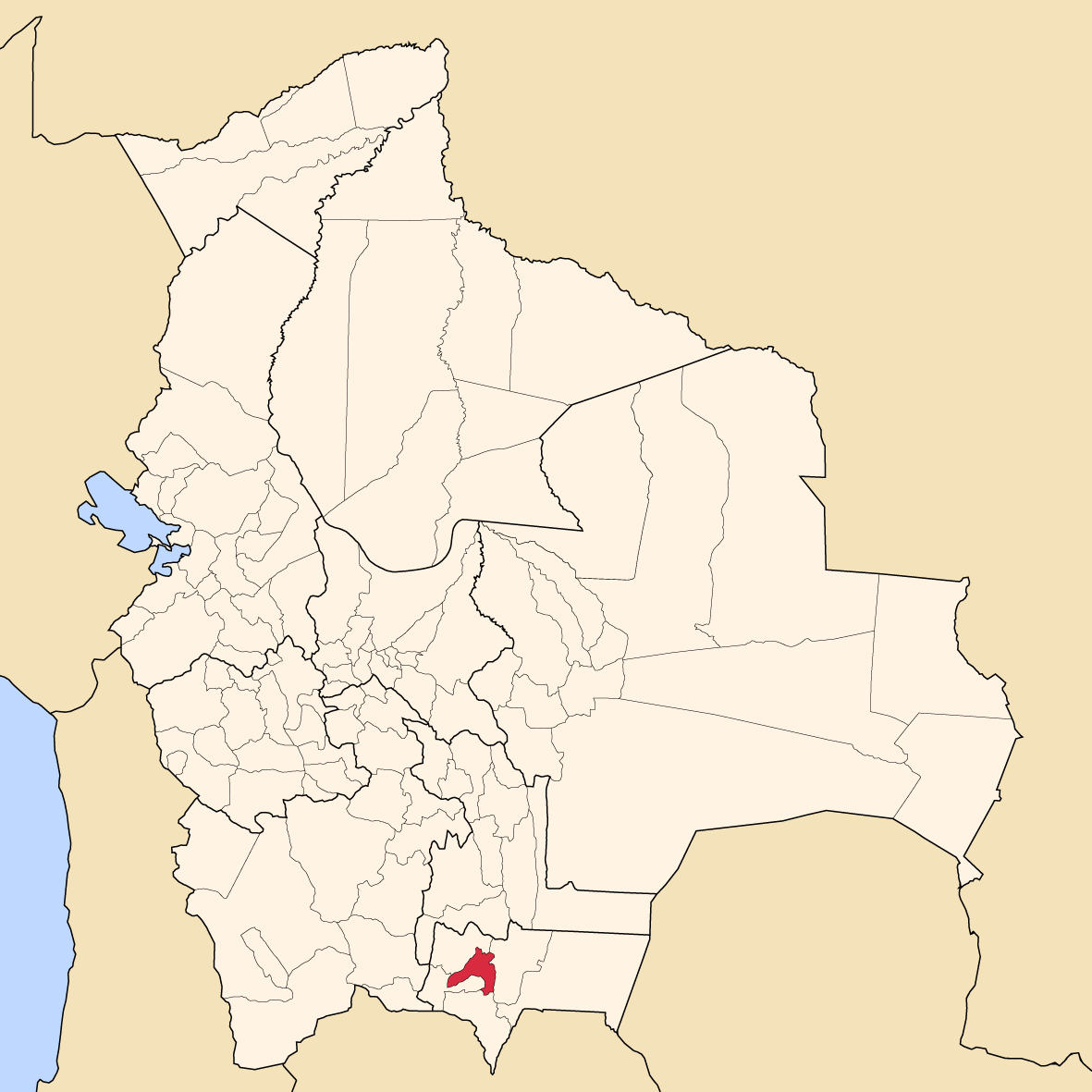
- Country: Bolivia
- Department: Tarija
- Capital: Tarija

Area
  - Land: 2,046 km^{2} (790 sq mi)

Population (2024)
  - Total: 238,942
  - Density: 112/km^{2} (290/sq mi)
- ISO 3166 code: BO.TR.CE

Cercado is a province in the central parts of the Bolivian department Tarija.

== Location ==
Cercado province is one of six provinces in the Tarija Department. It is located between 21° 15' and 21° 51' south and between 64° 20' and 65° 00' west.

The province borders Eustaquio Méndez Province in the northwest, José María Avilés Province in the south-west, Aniceto Arce Province in the south, and Burnet O'Connor Province in the east.

The province extends over 80 km from north to south, and 80 km from east to west.

== Population ==
The main language used in the province is Spanish, spoken by 99.4%, and 0.6% Guaraní.

The population increased from 108,241 inhabitants (1992 census) to 153,457 (2001 census), an increase of 41.8%. - 39.4% of the population are younger than 15 years old. In the census 2012 the population increased to 205,346 inhabitants, migration mainly driven by gas extraction boom of the region.

At the 1992 census, 26.0% of the population had no access to electricity and 39.4% had no sanitary facilities. 89.6% of the population were Catholics and 6.3% were Protestants. In 2001, 12.2% of the population were employed in agriculture, 0.1% in mining, 11.5% in industry, and 76.2% in general services.

== Division ==
In contrast to the neighbouring provinces, the province comprises only one municipality Tarija Municipality. It is identical to the Cercado Province.

== Places of interest ==
- Cordillera de Sama Biological Reserve
