= Eustaquio Méndez Province =

Province in Bolivia

Provincia Eustaquio Méndez
- Province
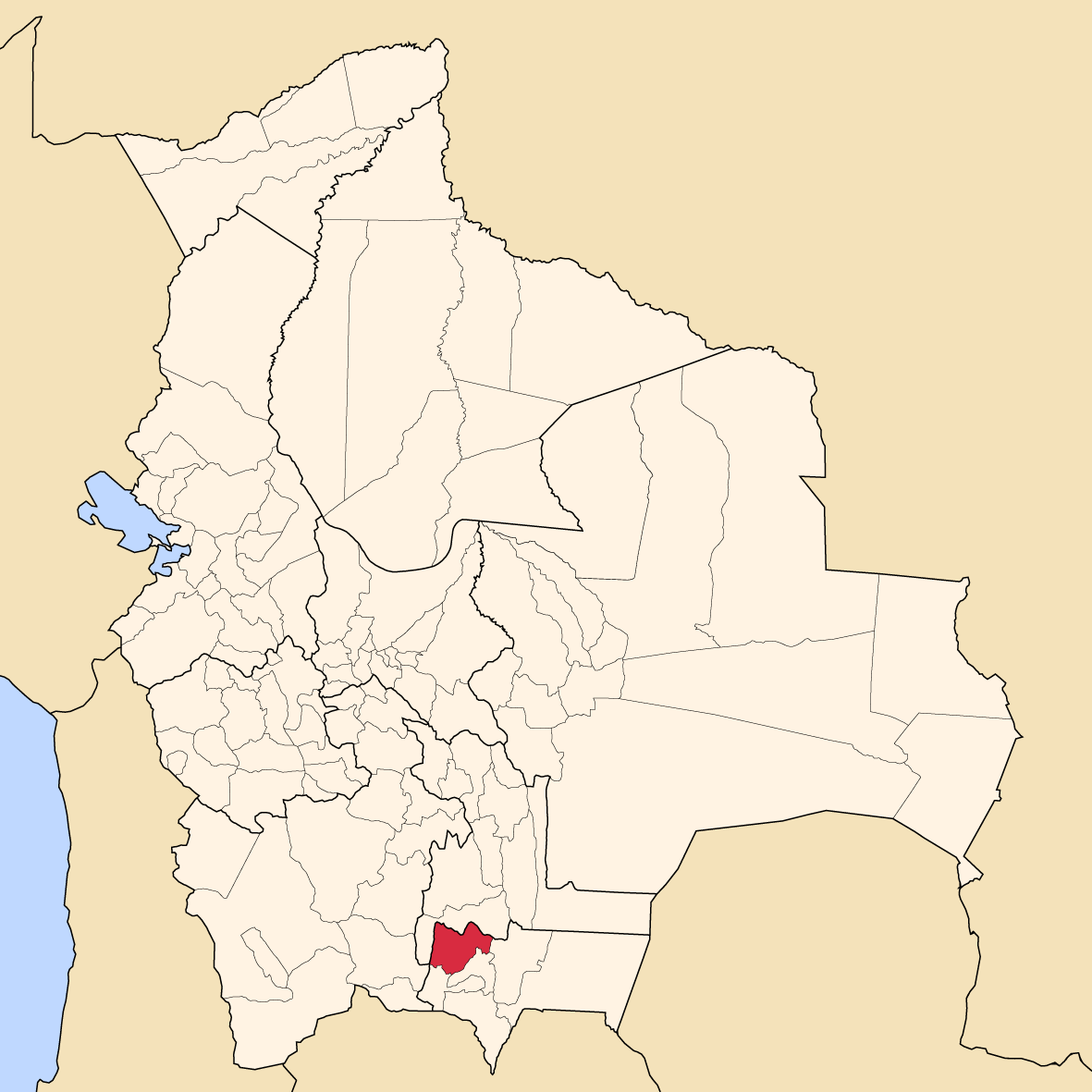
- Interactive map of Provincia Eustaquio Méndez
- Coordinates: 20°15′S 64°50′W
- Country: Bolivia
- Department: Tarija

Area
  - Total: 4,070 km^{2} (1,570 sq mi)

Population (2024)
  - Total: 39,856
  - Density: 9.79/km^{2} (25.4/sq mi)
- ISO 3166 code: BO.TR.MD

Eustaquio Méndez is a province in the north-western parts of the Bolivian department of Tarija. Its capital is San Lorenzo.

== Location ==
Eustaquio Méndez province is one of six provinces in the Tarija Department. It is located between 20° 57' and 21° 36' south and between 64° 23' and 65° 15' west.

The province borders Chuquisaca Department in the north and west, José María Avilés Province in the south, Cercado Province in the south-east, and Burnet O'Connor Province in the east.

The province extends over 90 km from north to south, and 105 km from east to west.

== Population ==
The principal language of the province is Spanish, spoken by 99.7% and 0.4% Guaraní.

The population increased from 29,868 inhabitants (1992 census) to 32,038 (2001 census), an increase of 7.3%. 46.9% of the population are younger than 15 years old.

In 1992, 78.1% of the population had no access to electricity and 77.8% have no sanitary facilities. 95.1% of the population are Catholics and 3.1% are Protestants.

In 2001, 67.8% of the population were employed in agriculture, 0.1% in mining, 5.9% in industry, and 26.2% in general services.

== Division ==
The province comprises two municipalities:

- El Puente Municipality
- San Lorenzo Municipality

=== Towns ===
- Canasmoro

== Places of interest ==
- Cordillera de Sama Biological Reserve
