= Laguna Grande (Bolivia) =

Lake in Bolivia

- Location within Bolivia Location within South America
- Interactive map of Laguna Grande
- Location: Tarija Department
- Coordinates: 21°47′20″S 65°5′21″W
- Basin countries: Bolivia
- Surface area: 6.7 km^{2} (2.6 sq mi)
- Surface elevation: 3,638 m (11,936 ft)

Laguna Grande is a lake in the Tarija Department, Bolivia. At an elevation of 3,638 m, its surface area is 6.7 km^{2}.

== See also ==
- Tajzara Lake
