= Cancañiri Formation =

Geologic formation in Bolivia

- Stratigraphic range: Katian-Hirnantian; ~460–439 Ma
- Type: Geological formation
- Underlies: Uncía Formation
- Overlies: Amutara & San Benito Formations
- Thickness: Up to 1,500 m (4,900 ft)

Lithology
- Primary: Sandstone, shale
- Other: Siltstone

Location
- Coordinates: 17.7°S 66.3°W
- Approximate paleocoordinates: 44.2°S 127.4°W
- Region: Cochabamba & Potosí Departments
- Country: Bolivia
- Extent: Cordillera Oriental

Type section
- Named for: Cancañiri
- Cancañiri Formation (Bolivia)

The Cancañiri Formation, also named as Cancañiri Tillite, is a Katian to Hirnantian geologic formation of central Bolivia. The pebbly, argillaceous sandstones, shales and siltstones of the up to 1,500 metres (4,900 ft) thick formation, were deposited in a glacial foreshore to deep water turbiditic environment. The formation is named after Cancañiri, a mining town close to Llallagua, where a local legend of a possessed woman is believed. The formation overlies the San Benito Formation in Cochabamba and the Amutara Formation in other parts. The Cancañiri Formation is overlain by the Uncía Formation.

== Fossil content ==
The formation has provided the following fossils:

- Destombesium pacochicoensis
- Dinorthis flabellulum
- Drabovinella curiosa
- Tunariorthis cardocanalis
- Oanduporella sp.
- Rostricellula sp.

== See also ==
- List of fossiliferous stratigraphic units in Bolivia
