= Baraya =

Coordinates: 3°9′11″N 75°3′9″W

- Municipality and town
- Flag Coat of arms

- Location of the municipality and town of Baraya in the Huila Department of Colombia.
- Country: Colombia
- Department: Huila Department

Area
  - Total: 737 km^{2} (285 sq mi)

Population (Census 2018)
  - Total: 6,679
  - Density: 9.06/km^{2} (23.5/sq mi)
- Time zone: UTC-5 (Colombia Standard Time)
- Website: www.baraya-huila.gov.co

Baraya is a town and municipality in the Huila Department of Colombia.

== Climate ==
Climate data for Baraya (Manila La Hda), elevation 700 m (2,300 ft), (1981–2010)
Month	Jan	Feb	Mar	Apr	May	Jun	Jul	Aug	Sep	Oct	Nov	Dec	Year
Mean daily maximum °C (°F)	32.9 (91.2)	33.0 (91.4)	32.4 (90.3)	31.8 (89.2)	31.8 (89.2)	32.3 (90.1)	32.9 (91.2)	33.8 (92.8)	33.9 (93.0)	32.6 (90.7)	31.2 (88.2)	31.5 (88.7)	32.5 (90.5)
Daily mean °C (°F)	27.2 (81.0)	27.4 (81.3)	27.1 (80.8)	26.6 (79.9)	26.6 (79.9)	27.0 (80.6)	27.3 (81.1)	28.0 (82.4)	28.0 (82.4)	27.0 (80.6)	26.1 (79.0)	26.3 (79.3)	27 (81)
Mean daily minimum °C (°F)	21.7 (71.1)	21.9 (71.4)	21.8 (71.2)	21.7 (71.1)	21.6 (70.9)	21.5 (70.7)	21.7 (71.1)	22.1 (71.8)	22.2 (72.0)	21.8 (71.2)	21.5 (70.7)	21.5 (70.7)	21.7 (71.1)
Average precipitation mm (inches)	53.9 (2.12)	78.0 (3.07)	125.2 (4.93)	125.3 (4.93)	96.1 (3.78)	47.1 (1.85)	32.2 (1.27)	22.3 (0.88)	49.6 (1.95)	138.6 (5.46)	158.7 (6.25)	107.0 (4.21)	1,034 (40.71)
Average precipitation days	8	9	13	15	15	13	12	11	10	15	16	11	146
Average relative humidity (%)	69	68	71	73	73	69	64	61	62	69	74	74	69
Source: Instituto de Hidrologia Meteorologia y Estudios Ambientales

Climate data for Baraya (Sto Domingo), elevation 1,275 m (4,183 ft), (1981–2010)
Month	Jan	Feb	Mar	Apr	May	Jun	Jul	Aug	Sep	Oct	Nov	Dec	Year
Mean daily maximum °C (°F)	28.4 (83.1)	28.1 (82.6)	28.0 (82.4)	27.7 (81.9)	27.6 (81.7)	27.7 (81.9)	27.5 (81.5)	28.0 (82.4)	28.5 (83.3)	28.2 (82.8)	27.2 (81.0)	27.4 (81.3)	27.9 (82.2)
Daily mean °C (°F)	23.3 (73.9)	23.3 (73.9)	23.0 (73.4)	23.0 (73.4)	23.0 (73.4)	23.0 (73.4)	22.8 (73.0)	23.3 (73.9)	23.5 (74.3)	23.1 (73.6)	22.6 (72.7)	22.7 (72.9)	23.0 (73.4)
Mean daily minimum °C (°F)	18.7 (65.7)	19.0 (66.2)	18.7 (65.7)	18.6 (65.5)	18.7 (65.7)	18.5 (65.3)	18.4 (65.1)	18.5 (65.3)	18.8 (65.8)	18.7 (65.7)	18.4 (65.1)	18.4 (65.1)	18.6 (65.5)
Average precipitation mm (inches)	50.9 (2.00)	51.3 (2.02)	115.7 (4.56)	93.4 (3.68)	102.2 (4.02)	59.6 (2.35)	49.3 (1.94)	37.4 (1.47)	51.5 (2.03)	116.6 (4.59)	117.8 (4.64)	69.6 (2.74)	904.5 (35.61)
Average precipitation days	7	8	14	15	16	14	14	12	13	16	15	11	151
Average relative humidity (%)	75	75	77	79	79	77	74	73	72	76	81	79	76
Source: Instituto de Hidrologia Meteorologia y Estudios Ambientales
