= Santiago Formation, Bolivia =

Geologic formation in Bolivia

Santiago Formation
- Stratigraphic range: Sandbian-Katian; ~460–450 Ma
- Type: Geological formation

Lithology
- Primary: Siltstone

Location
- Coordinates: 18.0°S 65.0°W
- Approximate paleocoordinates: 45.4°S 128.5°W
- Region: Cochabamba Department
- Country: Bolivia
- Extent: Cordillera Oriental
- Santiago Formation, Bolivia (Bolivia)

The Santiago Formation is a Sandbian to Katian geologic formation of central Bolivia. The formation comprises gray quartzitic siltstones.

== Fossil content ==
The formation has provided the following fossils:

- Bistramia sp.
- Lingula sp.
- Orthoceras sp.

== See also ==
- List of fossiliferous stratigraphic units in Bolivia
