= Pircancha Formation =

Geologic formation in Bolivia

- Stratigraphic range: Floian-Dapingian; ~478–466 Ma
- Type: Geological formation
- Thickness: 1,800 m (5,900 ft)

Lithology
- Primary: Mudstone
- Other: Shale, sandstone, pyrite

Location
- Coordinates: 21.0°S 65.0°W
- Approximate paleocoordinates: 45.3°S 129.1°W
- Region: Tarija Department
- Country: Bolivia
- Pircancha Formation (Bolivia)

The Pircancha Formation is a Floian to Dapingian geologic formation of southern Bolivia. The green mudstones, shales and sandstones were deposited in a shallow to open marine environment. The fossil Pircanchaspis rinconensis is named after the formation.

== Fossil content ==
The formation has provided the following fossils:

- Bactroceras boliviensis
- Baltograptus deflexus, B. minutus
- Pircanchaspis rinconensis
- Pseudophyllograptus densus
- Tetragraptus cf. amii
- Didymograptus cf. suecicus
- Basilicus sp.
- Dinorthis sp.
- Famatinolithus sp.
- Geragnostus sp.
- Hoekaspis sp.
- Phyllograptus sp.
- Synhomalonotus sp.

== See also ==
- List of fossiliferous stratigraphic units in Bolivia
