= San Lorenzo Formation, Bolivia =

Geologic formation in Bolivia

San Lorenzo Formation
- Stratigraphic range: Dapingian; ~478–466 Ma
- Type: Geological formation

Lithology
- Primary: Shale, sandstone
- Other: Quartzite

Location
- Coordinates: 21.0°S 65.0°W
- Approximate paleocoordinates: 45.3°S 129.1°W
- Region: Tarija Department
- Country: Bolivia

Type section
- Named for: San Lorenzo
- San Lorenzo Formation, Bolivia (Bolivia)

The San Lorenzo Formation is a Dapingian geologic formation of southern Bolivia. The dark gray, greenish, and black shale with thin intercalations of white-yellow quartzites were deposited in an open marine submarine fan environment.

== Fossil content ==
The formation has provided the following fossils:

- Didymograptus nitidus
- Dinorthis obispoensis
- Orthambonites calligramma
- Peelerophon oehlerti
- Tetragraptus quadribrachiatus
- Thysanopyge argentina
- Yutagraptus vdeflexus
- Phyllograptus cf. typus
- Dictyonema sp.
- Endoceras sp.
- Lecanospira sp.
- Megalaspidella sp.
- Pachendoceras sp.

== See also ==
- List of fossiliferous stratigraphic units in Bolivia
