= Sularp Brook =

Sularp Brook (55°42′49.3″N 13°19′31.8″E), Lund Municipality, Skåne, Sweden, is the location of the Global Boundary Stratotype Section and Point (GSSP) which marks the boundary between the Middle and Late epochs of the Ordovician period on the geologic time scale.

The first appearance of the graptolite Nemagraptus gracilis defines the boundary. The rock section consists primarily of dark-gray shale and mudstone, except for a phosphorite marker bed 1.4 m above the GSSP, and was probably deposited at a water depth exceeding 100 m. Drill cores have revealed almost identical stratigraphy across an area several km wide. Due to heating, possibly from an intrusive dike, the stratotype is unfit for dating by magnetic analysis, but this lack is compensated by the diversity of chemostratigraphic and biostratigraphic options.
