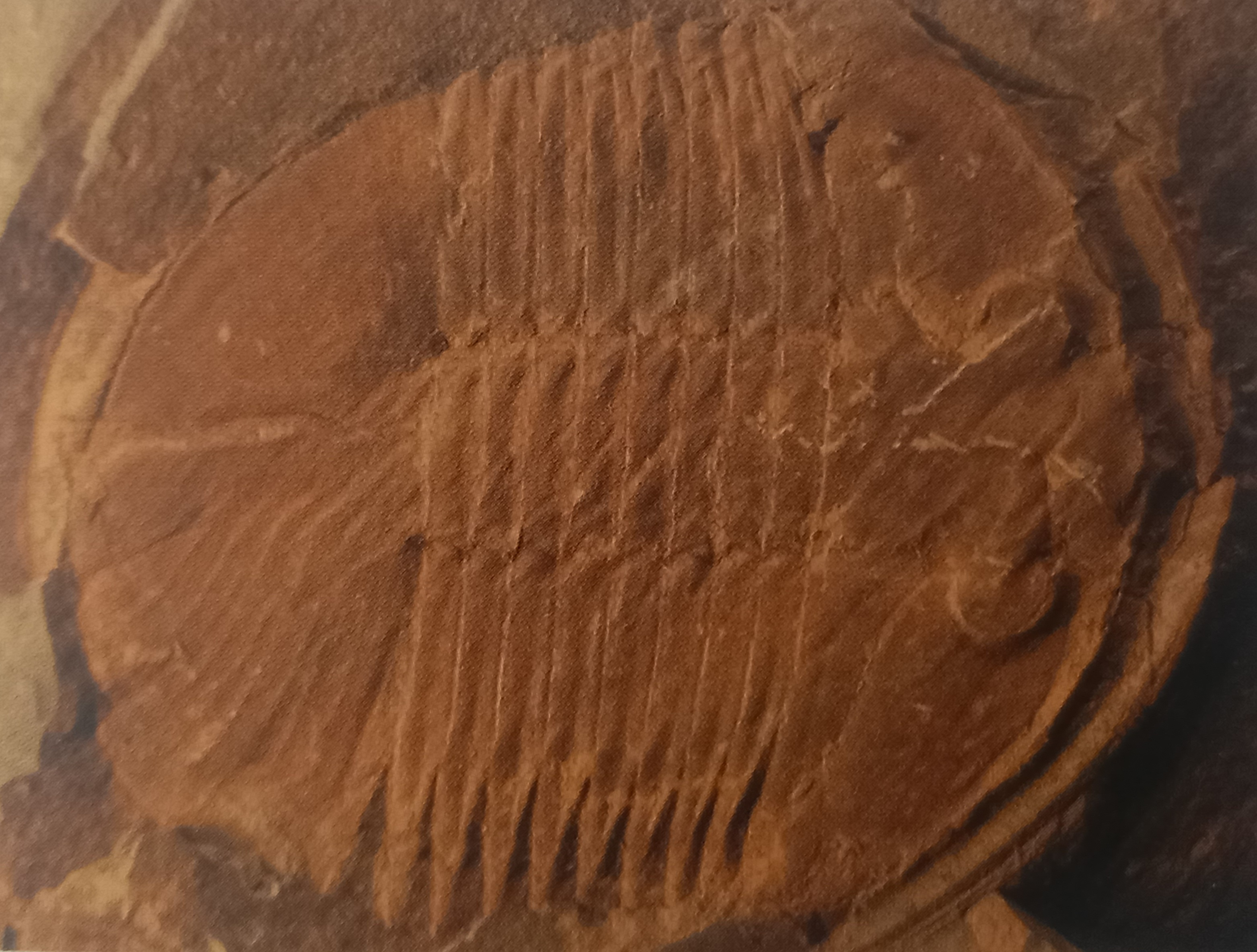
- Asaphellus fossil from Mila formation, Ordovician period, Damghan, Iran

Scientific classification
- Domain: Eukaryota
- Kingdom: Animalia
- Phylum: Arthropoda
- Class: †Trilobita
- Order: †Asaphida
- Family: †Asaphidae
- Genus: †Asaphellus; Callaway ,1877

= Asaphellus =

Asaphellus Temporal range: Sandbian–Hirnantian

Genus of trilobites

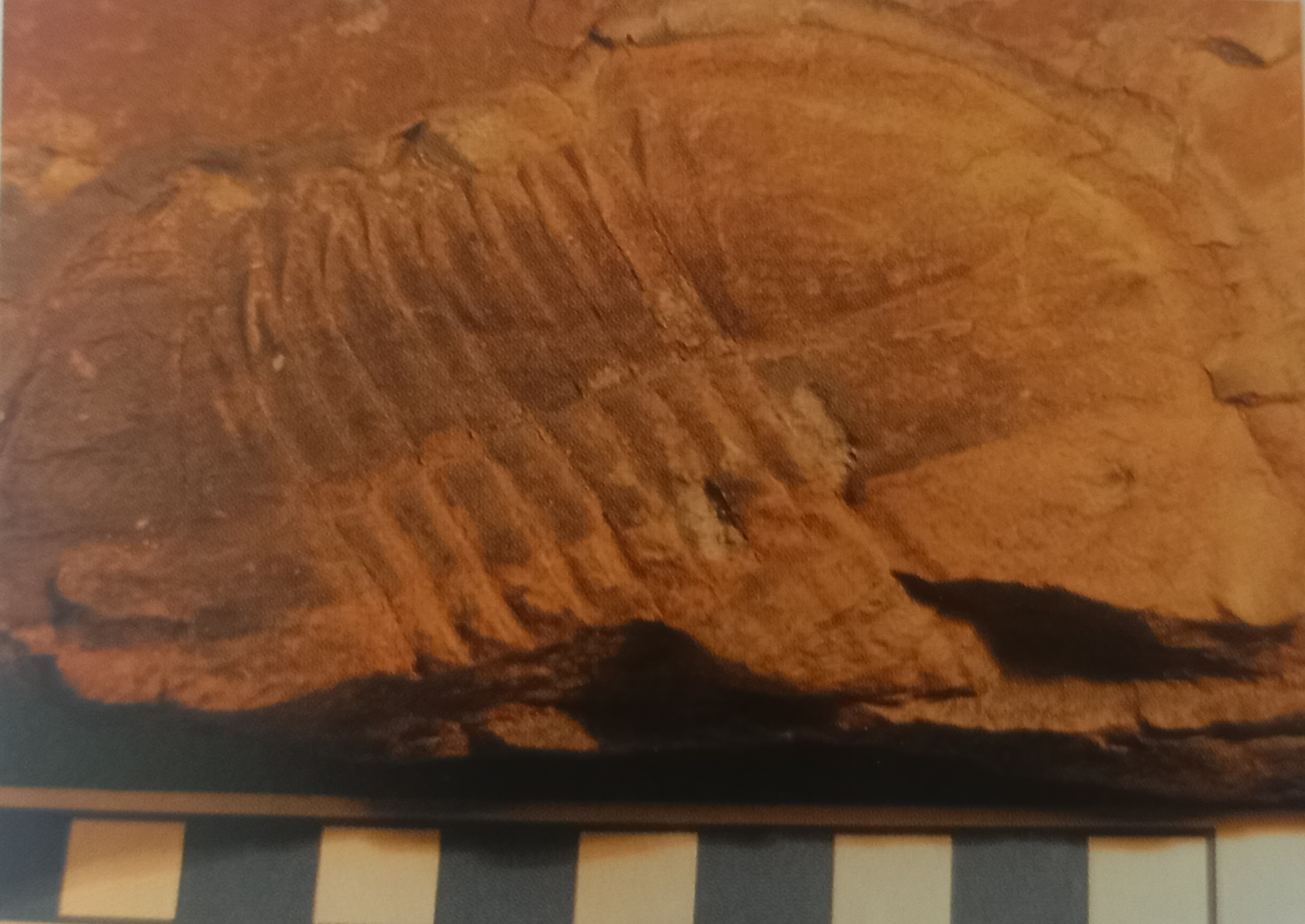
Asaphellus fossil from Mila formation, Ordovician period, Damghan, Iran

Asaphellus is an extinct genus of trilobites reported from the Ordovician. It is seen in Argentina, Bolivia, Mexico, America, Algeria, Iran, Spain, Portugal, France, Great Britain, Czech Republic, Norway, Sweden and China.
