= Micragnostus =

Scientific classification
- Domain: Eukaryota
- Kingdom: Animalia
- Phylum: Arthropoda
- Class: †Trilobita (?)
- Order: †Agnostida
- Family: †Agnostidae
- Genus: †Micragnostus; Howell, 1935

Genus of trilobites

Micragnostus is a genus of trilobites in the order Agnostida, which existed in what is now north Wales. It was described by Howell in 1935, and the type species is Micragnostus calvus, which was originally described as a species of Agnostus by Lake in 1906.
