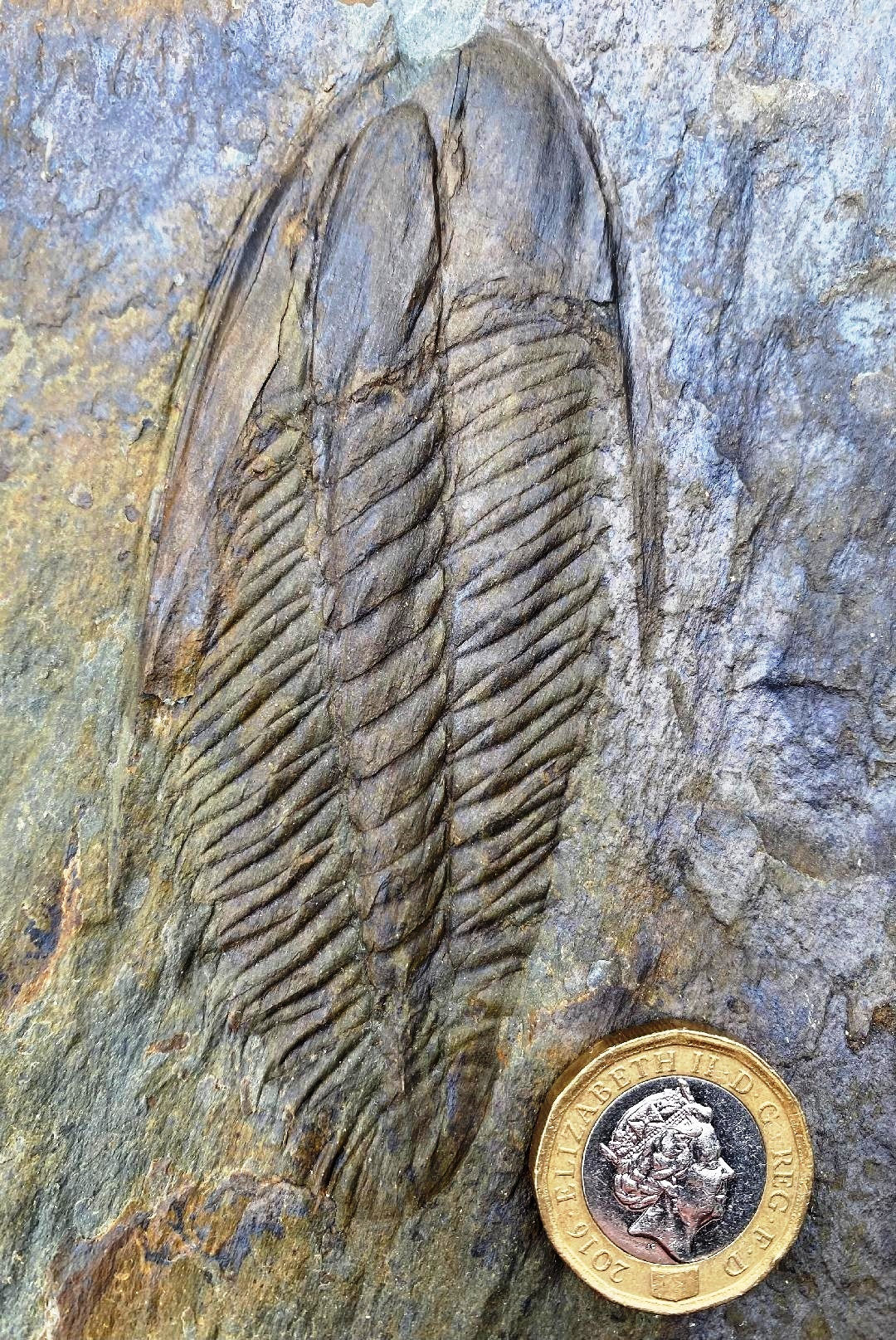
- Angelina sedgwickii Salter, 1859. Coin diameter = 23.4mm.

Scientific classification
- Kingdom: Animalia
- Phylum: Arthropoda
- Clade: †Artiopoda
- Class: †Trilobita
- Order: †Ptychopariida
- Family: †Olenidae
- Genus: †Angelina; Salter, 1859

Species
- Angelina sedgwickii Salter, 1859 (Type); Angelina hyeronimi; Angelina kayseri; Angelina punctolineata; Angelina spinosa

Synonyms
- Keidelaspis

= Angelina (trilobite) =

Angelina Temporal range: Early Ordovician 488–478 Ma

Extinct genus of trilobites

Angelina Salter, 1859, is a genus of ptychopariid trilobite belonging to the Family Olenidae, Suborder olenina. It lived during the Tremadocian Stage, lowermost of the two standard worldwide divisions forming the Lower Ordovician Series and lowest of the seven stages within the Ordovician System. It encompasses all rocks formed during Tremadocian times, which spanned the interval between 485.4 million and 477.7 million years ago. Fossilized remains of Angelina are known from Wales, Central and South America. It differs from most other Triarthrinae in being larger, with a relatively narrow glabella, the occipital ring poorly defined, and lateral glabellar furrows relatively obscure. Eyes are placed midlength that of the cephalon and the facial sutures converge on the front border at the midline. Species also have long genal spines.

The type species, Angelina sedgwickii Salter, 1859, was named for the Revd. Adam Sedgwick, the 19th Century Cambridge geologist who coined the term "Cambrian". This is the classic trilobite species found at Y Garth Hill, near Porthmadog, North West Wales (grid reference SH 598 394), and which has been collected for well over 100 years. This historic locality is described in Howells and Smith (1997) and Rushton et al. (2000, p.111). It lies in the Upper Mudstone Member of the Dol-cyn-afon Formation (formerly 'Angelina sedgwickii Beds' or 'Garth Hill Beds' of the Tremadoc slate.

== Species ==
- Angelina sedgwickii (Type species)
- Angelina hyeronimi
- Angelina kayseri
- Angelina punctolineata
- Angelina spinosa

== Distribution ==
Fossils of Angelina have been found in Argentina, Bolivia, Mexico, North West Wales and Shropshire, England.

== Gallery ==
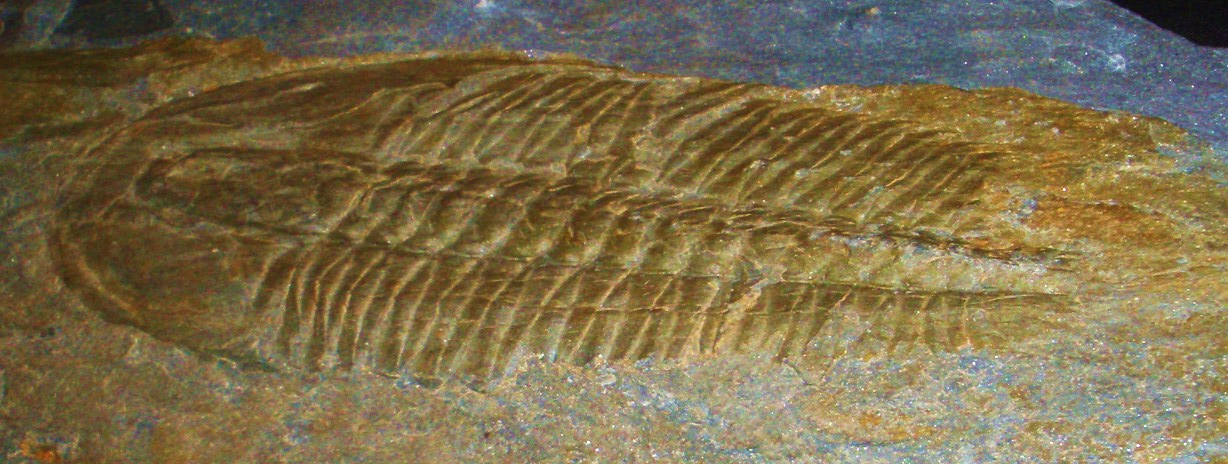
Angelina sedgwickii from the Tremadocian of North Wales
