= José María Avilés Province =

Coordinates: 21°50′S 64°50′W

- Province
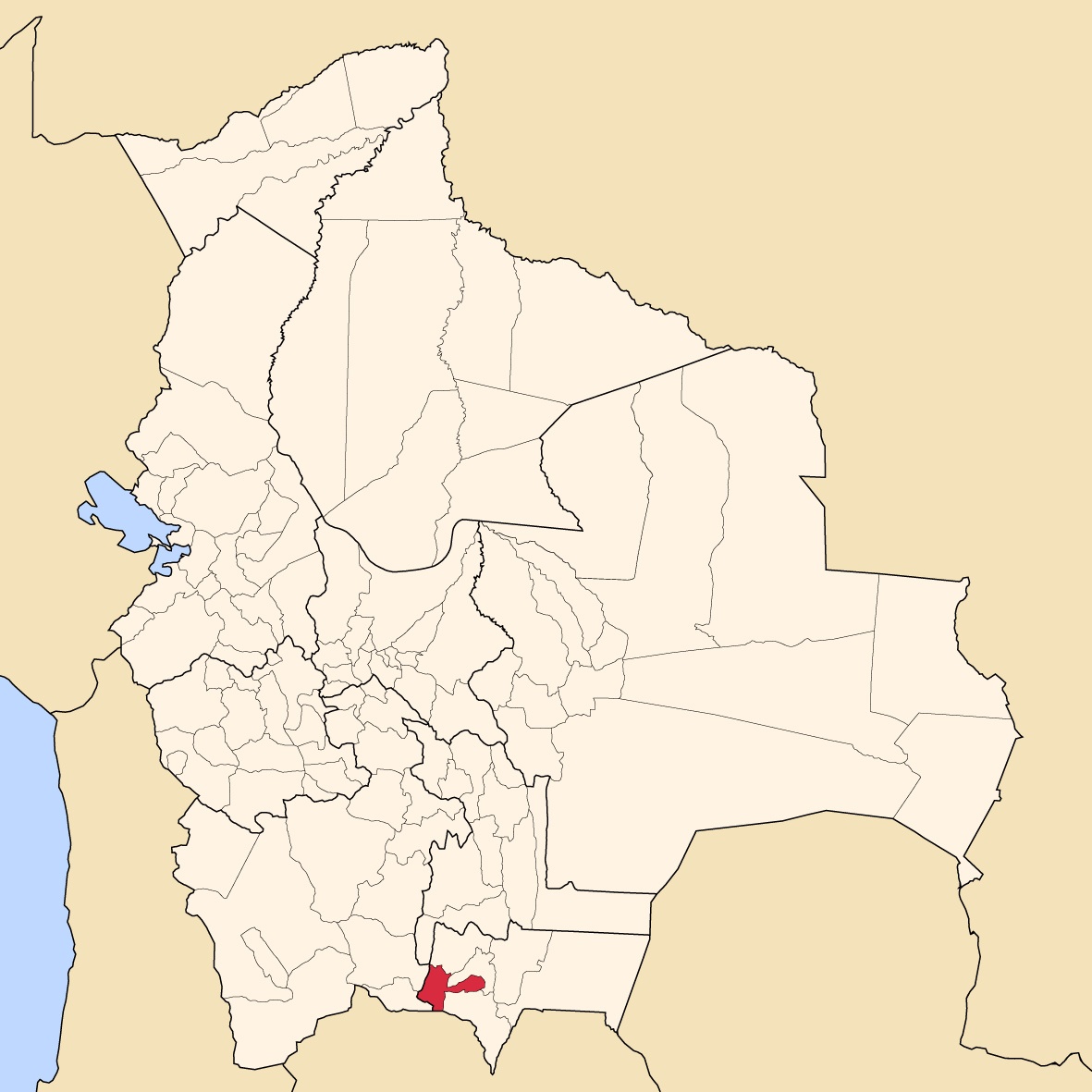
- Interactive map of José María Avilés Province

Population (2001)
  - Total: 17,504
  - Density: 6.6/km^{2} (17/sq mi)
- ISO 3166 code: BO.TR.AV

José María Avilés (or: Avilez) is a province in the western parts of the Bolivian department of Tarija.

== Location ==
Avilés province is one of six provinces in the Tarija Department. It is located between 21° 28' and 22° 05' south and between 64° 29' and 65° 25' west.

The province borders Eustaquio Méndez Province in the north, Potosí Department in the west, Argentina in the south, Aniceto Arce Province in the south-east, and Cercado Province in the north-east.

The province extends over 85 km from north to south, and 115 km from east to west.

== Division ==
The province comprises two municipalities:

- Uriondo Municipality
- Yunchará Municipality

== Places of interest ==
- Cordillera de Sama Biological Reserve
- Tariquía Flora and Fauna National Reserve
