= Sandbian =

First age of the Late Ordovician epoch

- 458.2 ± 0.7 – 452.8 ± 0.7 Ma

Chronology
← / First land plant spores; ← / Ordovician meteor event
Subdivision of the Ordovician according to the ICS, as of 2024. Vertical axis scale: Millions of years ago

Etymology
- Name formality: Formal

Usage information
- Celestial body: Earth
- Regional usage: Global (ICS)
- Time scale(s) used: ICS Time Scale

Definition
- Chronological unit: Age
- Stratigraphic unit: Stage
- Time span formality: Formal
- Lower boundary definition: FAD of the Graptolite Nemagraptus gracilis
- Lower boundary GSSP: Fågelsång section, Sularp Brook, Skåne, Sweden; 55.7137°N 13.3255°E
- Lower GSSP ratified: 2002
- Upper boundary definition: FAD of the Graptolite Diplacanthograptus caudatus
- Upper boundary GSSP: Black Knob Ridge section, Oklahoma, United States; 34.4305°N 96.0746°W
- Upper GSSP ratified: 2006

The Sandbian is the first stage of the Upper Ordovician. It follows the Darriwilian and is succeeded by the Katian. Its lower boundary is defined as the first appearance datum of the graptolite species Nemagraptus gracilis around 458.2 million years ago. The Sandbian lasted for about 5.4 million years until the beginning of the Katian around 452.8 million years ago.

== Naming ==
The name Sandbian is derived from the village Södra Sandby (Lund Municipality, Skåne County, Sweden). The name was proposed in 2006.

== GSSP ==
The GSSP of the Sandbian is the Fågelsång section (55.7137°N 13.3255°E) at Sularp Brook, east of Lund (Skåne, Sweden). It is an outcrop of shale and mudstone. The lower boundary of the Sandbian is defined as the first appearance datum of graptolite species Nemagraptus gracilis in that section.
