= Iscayachi =

Town in Tarija Department, Bolivia

Coordinates: 21.4797°S 64.9698°W

Iscayachi is a sparsely populated town in the Bolivian high valleys, located at the Eustaquio Méndez province Junction, north Tarija, at an elevation of 2,915 meters. The population is reported to be 1,153.

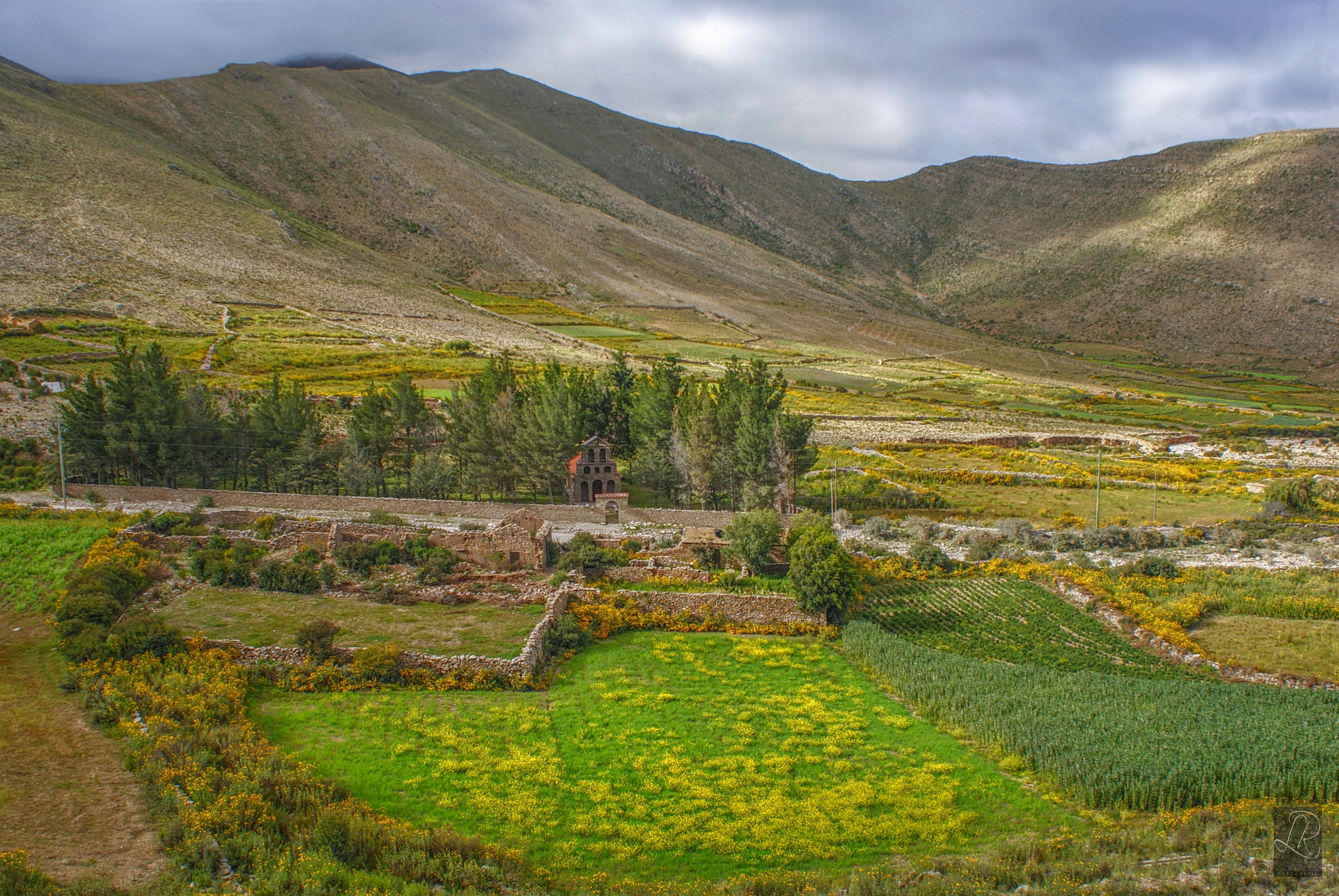
View from Iscayachi

There are different theories about the toponym, one of the most widespread by some is that it derives from quechua: iskaychay, which means "divide in two", supposedly referring to the highway.

Iscayachi has a simple guest house, and birdwatchers find it be a productive location to view the avifauna of the high valleys. It was formerly served by bus on the main long-distance bus routes between Tarija and western Bolivia before there was built a new mountain crossing road between Tarija in the east and San Lorencito in the west further in the north.

== Climate ==
Climate data for Iscayachi (Campanario), elevation 3,460 m (11,350 ft), (1990–2015)
Month	Jan	Feb	Mar	Apr	May	Jun	Jul	Aug	Sep	Oct	Nov	Dec	Year
Record high °C (°F)	24.5 (76.1)	24.0 (75.2)	25.0 (77.0)	26.0 (78.8)	26.2 (79.2)	27.5 (81.5)	23.0 (73.4)	23.5 (74.3)	25.5 (77.9)	29.0 (84.2)	27.0 (80.6)	26.5 (79.7)	29.0 (84.2)
Mean daily maximum °C (°F)	17.6 (63.7)	18.0 (64.4)	18.2 (64.8)	19.6 (67.3)	18.3 (64.9)	17.7 (63.9)	16.6 (61.9)	18.2 (64.8)	19.3 (66.7)	19.9 (67.8)	19.5 (67.1)	18.9 (66.0)	18.5 (65.3)
Daily mean °C (°F)	11.1 (52.0)	11.1 (52.0)	11.0 (51.8)	10.6 (51.1)	8.5 (47.3)	7.9 (46.2)	7.3 (45.1)	8.7 (47.7)	10.0 (50.0)	11.4 (52.5)	11.5 (52.7)	11.6 (52.9)	10.1 (50.1)
Mean daily minimum °C (°F)	4.5 (40.1)	4.2 (39.6)	3.7 (38.7)	1.4 (34.5)	−1.3 (29.7)	−1.9 (28.6)	−2.0 (28.4)	−0.7 (30.7)	0.6 (33.1)	2.9 (37.2)	3.4 (38.1)	4.3 (39.7)	1.6 (34.9)
Record low °C (°F)	−3.0 (26.6)	−2.5 (27.5)	−5.0 (23.0)	−9.0 (15.8)	−10.5 (13.1)	−15.0 (5.0)	−15.5 (4.1)	−10.0 (14.0)	−12.0 (10.4)	−6.0 (21.2)	−6.5 (20.3)	−4.0 (24.8)	−15.5 (4.1)
Average precipitation mm (inches)	102.5 (4.04)	86.6 (3.41)	54.8 (2.16)	11.6 (0.46)	2.2 (0.09)	0.5 (0.02)	0.0 (0.0)	1.8 (0.07)	4.8 (0.19)	18.4 (0.72)	19.4 (0.76)	64.6 (2.54)	367.2 (14.46)
Average precipitation days	16.4	12.3	11.2	3.0	0.6	0.2	0.0	0.5	0.9	3.2	5.3	10.9	64.5
Average relative humidity (%)	59.2	61.0	61.7	58.4	53.0	45.3	44.8	46.7	49.3	51.7	53.7	56.2	53.4
Source: Servicio Nacional de Meteorología e Hidrología de Bolivia
