= San Lorenzo, Tarija =

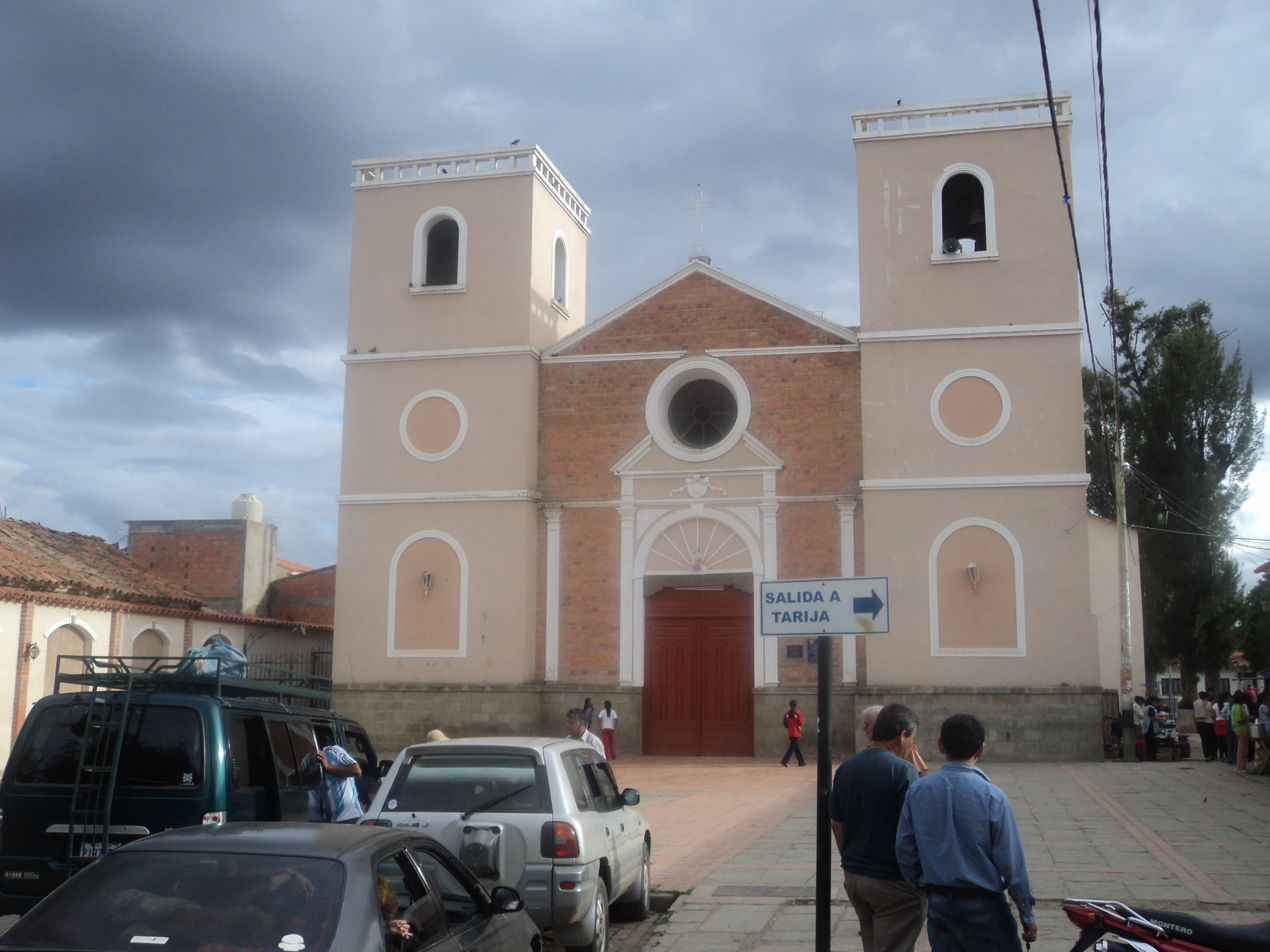
Church of San Lorenzo

San Lorenzo (or: Villa San Lorenzo) is a town in the Tarija Department in Bolivia.

== Location ==
San Lorenzo is the administrative center of Eustaquio Méndez Province and situated at 21°25′00″S 64°44′58″W, 2,001 m above sea level, on the left bank of Río Calama, 15 km north of Tarija, the department capital.

== Population ==
San Lorenzo had a population of 2,340 inhabitants according to the 1992 (census), 2,754 inhabitants according to the 2001 census, and was predicted to have more than 3,000 inhabitants by 2007.

San Lorenzo was the home of Eustaquio Méndez, one of the leaders in the fights for the Argentina independence. The local museum Casa del Moto Méndez exhibits some of his personal belongings and weapons.

== Climate ==
Climate data for Coimata, elevation 2,027 m (6,650 ft), (1980–2015)
Month	Jan	Feb	Mar	Apr	May	Jun	Jul	Aug	Sep	Oct	Nov	Dec	Year
Record high °C (°F)	34.8 (94.6)	35.2 (95.4)	34.0 (93.2)	35.0 (95.0)	36.4 (97.5)	35.0 (95.0)	35.8 (96.4)	35.8 (96.4)	36.6 (97.9)	37.0 (98.6)	38.8 (101.8)	36.8 (98.2)	38.8 (101.8)
Mean daily maximum °C (°F)	25.5 (77.9)	25.2 (77.4)	24.8 (76.6)	24.2 (75.6)	23.8 (74.8)	24.0 (75.2)	23.8 (74.8)	25.0 (77.0)	25.4 (77.7)	26.6 (79.9)	26.2 (79.2)	25.9 (78.6)	25.0 (77.1)
Daily mean °C (°F)	19.8 (67.6)	19.4 (66.9)	18.9 (66.0)	17.5 (63.5)	14.9 (58.8)	13.6 (56.5)	13.3 (55.9)	15.0 (59.0)	16.6 (61.9)	18.9 (66.0)	19.3 (66.7)	19.8 (67.6)	17.3 (63.0)
Mean daily minimum °C (°F)	14.0 (57.2)	13.5 (56.3)	13.0 (55.4)	10.7 (51.3)	6.1 (43.0)	3.1 (37.6)	2.9 (37.2)	4.9 (40.8)	7.7 (45.9)	11.2 (52.2)	12.4 (54.3)	13.6 (56.5)	9.4 (49.0)
Record low °C (°F)	7.3 (45.1)	2.2 (36.0)	2.3 (36.1)	−2.6 (27.3)	−6.4 (20.5)	−9.8 (14.4)	−10.5 (13.1)	−8.7 (16.3)	−6.2 (20.8)	0.9 (33.6)	1.0 (33.8)	4.8 (40.6)	−10.5 (13.1)
Average precipitation mm (inches)	158.0 (6.22)	139.0 (5.47)	109.6 (4.31)	30.4 (1.20)	3.1 (0.12)	0.6 (0.02)	0.7 (0.03)	2.8 (0.11)	11.1 (0.44)	41.0 (1.61)	70.4 (2.77)	153.2 (6.03)	719.9 (28.33)
Average precipitation days	14.1	12.8	11.1	4.7	1.3	0.3	0.5	0.9	2.4	6.1	8.9	12.8	75.9
Average relative humidity (%)	72.5	74.9	76.0	72.1	65.3	57.2	54.0	53.5	55.1	60.3	61.3	69.5	64.3
Source: Servicio Nacional de Meteorología e Hidrología de Bolivia

Climate data for Tucumillas, elevation 2,560 m (8,400 ft) (1977–2015)
Month	Jan	Feb	Mar	Apr	May	Jun	Jul	Aug	Sep	Oct	Nov	Dec	Year
Mean daily maximum °C (°F)	20.8 (69.4)	20.4 (68.7)	20.2 (68.4)	19.8 (67.6)	19.7 (67.5)	20.9 (69.6)	20.3 (68.5)	21.2 (70.2)	21.4 (70.5)	22.2 (72.0)	21.8 (71.2)	21.6 (70.9)	20.9 (69.5)
Daily mean °C (°F)	15.8 (60.4)	15.5 (59.9)	15.3 (59.5)	14.2 (57.6)	12.5 (54.5)	12.6 (54.7)	11.8 (53.2)	12.7 (54.9)	13.4 (56.1)	15.4 (59.7)	15.6 (60.1)	16.1 (61.0)	14.2 (57.6)
Mean daily minimum °C (°F)	10.7 (51.3)	10.6 (51.1)	10.4 (50.7)	8.6 (47.5)	5.4 (41.7)	4.3 (39.7)	3.3 (37.9)	4.2 (39.6)	5.4 (41.7)	8.7 (47.7)	9.4 (48.9)	10.6 (51.1)	7.6 (45.7)
Average precipitation mm (inches)	186.8 (7.35)	172.2 (6.78)	136.0 (5.35)	29.2 (1.15)	4.7 (0.19)	0.9 (0.04)	2.3 (0.09)	4.0 (0.16)	8.9 (0.35)	40.8 (1.61)	76.3 (3.00)	146.3 (5.76)	808.4 (31.83)
Average precipitation days	13.6	12.5	11.4	4.7	1.4	0.6	0.5	0.7	1.8	5.5	8.0	11.2	71.9
Source: Servicio Nacional de Meteorología e Hidrología de Bolivia
