= 2018 in non-avian dinosaur paleontology =

The year 2018 in non-avian dinosaur paleontology was eventful. Archosaurs include the only living dinosaur group — birds — and the reptile crocodilians, plus all extinct dinosaurs, extinct crocodilian relatives, and pterosaurs. Archosaur palaeontology is the scientific study of those animals, especially as they existed before the Holocene Epoch began about 11,700 years ago. This article records new taxa of fossil archosaurs of the non-avian variety that have been described during the year 2018, as well as other significant discoveries and events related to paleontology of archosaurs that occurred in the year 2018.

== Research ==
- A study intending to identify the evolutionary processes that drove the diversification of dinosaur body mass is published by Benson et al. (2018).
- A study on the impact of geography on the evolutionary radiation of dinosaurs is published by O'Donovan, Meade & Venditti (2018), who note increasing amounts of sympatric speciation as terrestrial space became a limiting factor.
- A study on the impact of publication history on the estimates of dinosaur diversity patterns through time is published by Tennant, Chiarenza & Baron (2018).
- A study evaluating the possible influence of cuirassal ventilation and a herbivorous diet on the orientation of the pubis of dinosaurs is published by Macaluso & Tschopp (2018).
- A study on embryos of extant reptiles and birds, aiming to determine the developmental mechanism underlying the acquisition of the dinosaur-type perforated acetabulum, is published by Egawa et al. (2018).
- A study on the nesting style and incubation heat source in non-avian dinosaurs as indicated by comparison with extant crocodylians and megapode birds is published by Tanaka et al. (2018).
- A study on pigment traces in fossilized dinosaur eggshells is published by Wiemann, Yang & Norell (2018), who interpret their findings as indicating that eggshell coloration and pigment pattern originated in nonavian theropod dinosaurs.
- A study on the nutritional value of plants grown under elevated CO_{2} levels, evaluating the hypothesis that constraints on sauropod diet quality were driven by Mesozoic CO_{2} concentration, is published by Gill et al. (2018).
- Studies evaluating the link between the Carnian Pluvial Event and the explosive diversification of dinosaurs in the early Late Triassic are published by Bernardi et al. (2018) and Benton, Bernardi & Kinsella (2018).
- A study comparing non-avian dinosaur faunas of Appalachia and Laramidia from the Aptian to Maastrichtian stages of the Cretaceous period is published by Brownstein (2018), who also evaluates dinosaur provincialism and ecology on Appalachia.
- A study on the bone histology of sauropod dinosaurs and birds, looking for histological correlates indicative of the presence of bird-like air sacs, is published by Lambertz, Bertozzo & Sander (2018).
- A study on the Middle Jurassic flora from Yorkshire (United Kingdom) as indicated by pollen and spores, and on the possible dinosaur-plant interactions in the area is published by Slater et al. (2018).
- Description and analysis of insect borings on hadrosaur bones from the late Campanian Cerro del Pueblo Formation (Mexico) is published by Serrano-Brañas, Espinosa-Chávez & Maccracken (2018).
- A study on the sedimentological and ichnological contexts of Early Jurassic dinosaur tracks and trackways from the Ha Nohana palaeosurface located within the upper Elliot Formation (Lesotho), and on the locomotor dynamics and behaviour of the trackmaker dinosaurs, is published by Rampersadh et al. (2018).
- New Middle Jurassic dinosaur tracksite, preserving sauropod and theropod tracks, is described from the Lealt Shale Formation (Skye, Scotland, United Kingdom) by dePolo et al. (2018).
- Large theropod (possibly carcharodontosaurid) and ornithopod (basal hadrosauroid) tracks are described from the Lower Cretaceous Sanbukdong Formation (South Korea) by Lee et al. (2018).
- A unique association of hadrosaur and therizinosaur tracks is reported from the Late Cretaceous lower Cantwell Formation (Alaska, United States) by Fiorillo et al. (2018).
- Large theropod and small sauropod tracks are described from the Lower Cretaceous Jingchuan Formation (China) by Lockley et al. (2018), who name a new ichnotaxon Ordexallopus zhanglifui.
- A study on the small to medium-sized tridactyl theropod tracks from the Upper Jurassic of the Jura Mountains (Switzerland), focusing on the possible variations in footprint shape along trackways, is published by Castanera et al. (2018).
- Theropod tracks (probably produced by Acrocanthosaurus) are described from the Cretaceous (Albian) De Queen Formation (Arkansas, United States) by Platt et al. (2018).
- First Cretaceous track morphotype attributable to the non-avian theropod ichnogenus Gigandipus is reported from the Lower Cretaceous Jiaguan Formation (Guizhou, China) by Xing et al. (2018), who name a new ichnospecies Gigandipus chiappei.
- New dinosaur ootaxon Duovallumoolithus shangdanensis is described on the basis of fossil eggs from the Upper Cretaceous Lijiacun Formation (China) by Zheng et al. (2018).
- A study on dendroolithid eggs from the Upper Cretaceous Tumiaoling Hill locality (Gaogou Formation; Yunxian, Hubei Province, China) is published by Zhang et al. (2018), who transfer the oospecies "Dendroolithus" tumiaolingensis Zhou, Ren, Xu & Guan (1998) to the genus Placoolithus.
- Evidence of cuticle preservation on theropod eggshells from the Nanxiong Group in China and the Two Medicine Formation in Montana, United States is presented by Yang et al. (2018).
- Description of a femur of a young diplodocoid sauropod from the Carnegie Quarry (Upper Jurassic Morrison Formation) at Dinosaur National Monument (United States), showing extensive bite marks on the bone, and a study on the identity and feeding technique of the tracemaker is published by Hone & Chure (2018).
- A skull of a chasmosaurine ceratopsian, preserving bite traces made by a tyrannosaurid theropod, is described from the Campanian Kirtland Formation (New Mexico, United States) by Dalman & Lucas (2018).
- A study on the function of denticle shape variation in the teeth of coelurosaurs of various body shapes and sizes is published by Torices et al. (2018).
- New data on feather anatomy in theropod dinosaurs Sinosauropteryx, Caudipteryx and Anchiornis is presented by Saitta, Gelernter & Vinther (2018).
- Theropod tracksite discovered in the Maastrichtian Nemegt Formation (Mongolia), preserving tracks of least four different trackmakers, and associated with a distorted foot skeleton of Gallimimus, is described by Lee et al. (2018).
- Didactyl theropod tracks with similarities to footprints attributed to small deinonychosaurian theropods are described from the Middle Jurassic (Aalenian-Bajocian) Dansirit Formation (Iran) by Xing, Abbassi & Lockley (2018).
- Parallel trackways indicating a group of small didactyl bipeds of inferred deinonychosaurian affinity are described from the Lower Cretaceous Dasheng Group (China) by Xing et al. (2018).
- Didactyl tracks attributed to juvenile or diminutive dromaeosaurs are described from the Lower Cretaceous (Aptian) Jinju Formation (South Korea) by Kim et al. (2018), who name a new ichnotaxon Dromaeosauriformipes rarus.
- Bishop et al. (2018) present predictive equations that may be used to model non-avian theropod locomotion, developed on the basis of a study of extant ground-running birds.
- A three-part series of papers investigating the architecture of cancellous bone in the main hindlimb bones of theropod dinosaurs, and evaluating its implications for inferring locomotor biomechanics in extinct non-avian theropods, is published by Bishop et al. (2018).
- A study on the resource partitioning among theropod dinosaurs known from the mid-Cretaceous assemblages from Niger (Gadoufaoua) and Morocco (Kem Kem Beds) as indicated by calcium isotope values from tooth enamel is published by Hassler et al. (2018).
- A study on the early evolution of the theropod hands and wrists, especially on the transition from five- to four-fingered hands, as indicated by the anatomy of the hands of Coelophysis bauri and Megapnosaurus rhodesiensis is published by Barta, Nesbitt & Norell (2018).
- A study on the morphological changes that occurred during ontogeny in the postcranial skeleton of Coelophysis bauri and Megapnosaurus rhodesiensis is published by Griffin (2018).
- A study on the anatomy, phylogenetic relationships, paleobiology and biogeography of members of Ceratosauria is published by Delcourt (2018), who names a new clade Etrigansauria.
- A study on the pneumatization of a noasaurid vertebra recovered from the Upper Cretaceous Adamantina Formation (Brazil) is published by Brum et al. (2018).
- Two shed tooth crowns of an abelisaurid theropod are described from the Cenomanian Alcântara Formation by Sales, de Oliveira & Schultz (2018), representing the oldest abelisaurid occurrence from Brazil to date.
- Paulina-Carabajal & Filippi (2018) reconstruct the endocranial cavity enclosing the brain, cranial nerves, blood vessels and the labyrinth of the inner ear of the holotype specimen of Viavenator exxoni.
- Description of the osteology of Viavenator exxoni is published by Filippi et al. (2018).
- Fragmented theropod maxilla from the Upper Cretaceous Presidente Prudente Formation (Brazil), initially thought to be a carcharodontosaurid fossil, is interpreted as more likely to be an abelisaurid fossil by Delcourt & Grillo (2018).
- A vertebra of a large megalosaurid theropod, as well as large theropod footprints representing two morphotypes, are described from the Upper Jurassic (Kimmeridgian) of Asturias (Spain) by Rauhut et al. (2018).
- A study on the anatomy and histology of a partial spinosaurid tibia from the Lower Cretaceous Romualdo Formation (Brazil), possessing traits previously only observed in Spinosaurus aegyptiacus and correlated with semi-aquatic habits in many limbed vertebrates, is published by Aureliano et al. (2018).
- Spinosaurid fossils assigned to a form distinct from Baryonyx, Suchomimus and Sigilmassasaurus are described from the upper Barremian Arcillas de Morella Formation (Spain) by Malafaia et al. (2018).
- A nearly complete pedal ungual phalanx of an early juvenile specimen of Spinosaurus, representing the smallest known specimen assigned to this genus reported so far, is described from the Cretaceous Kem Kem Beds (Morocco) by Maganuco & Dal Sasso (2018).
- A study on the floating capabilities of Spinosaurus and other theropods is published by Henderson (2018), who argues that Spinosaurus was not highly specialized for a semi-aquatic mode of life.
- A study on the anatomy of the skull of Concavenator corcovatus is published by Cuesta et al. (2018).
- A study on the limb anatomy of Concavenator corcovatus is published by Cuesta, Ortega & Sanz (2018).
- A review of the fossil record of carcharodontosaurid theropods from the Cretaceous of North Africa, assessing its implications for understanding the distribution and ecological role of members of this group, is published by Candeiro et al. (2018).
- Description of theropod (including tyrannosauroid, ornithomimosaur and dromaeosaurid) specimens from the Ellisdale site of the Cretaceous Marshalltown Formation (New Jersey, United States) is published by Brownstein (2018).
- A study on the dietary and habitat preferences of theropod dinosaurs from the Upper Cretaceous Mussentuchit Member of the Cedar Mountain Formation of Utah is published by Frederickson, Engel & Cifelli (2018).
- Theropod fossils from the Lower Cretaceous (Albian) Santana Formation (Brazil), initially thought to be oviraptorosaur fossils, are reinterpreted as fossils of a member of Megaraptora by Aranciaga Rolando et al. (2018).
- A study on the phylogenetic relationships of Timimus hermani and Santanaraptor placidus is published by Delcourt & Grillo (2018), who interpret these taxa as tyrannosauroid theropods, and name new clades Pantyrannosauria and Eutyrannosauria.
- The first neurocranial and paleoneurological description of Dilong paradoxus, comparing it with large tyrannosaurids, is published online by Kundrát et al. (2018).
- A metatarsal bone of an indeterminate tyrannosauroid theropod, indicative of an animal in the size range of tyrannosauroids from the Santonian to Maastrichtian, is described from the Cenomanian Potomac Formation of New Jersey by Brownstein (2018), representing the only definite occurrence of a tyrannosauroid in Appalachia (eastern North America) before the Coniacian and Santonian.
- Three foot bones of large tyrannosauroid theropods, interpreted as fossils of non-tyrannosaurid tyrannosauroids, are described from the Maastrichtian Navesink Formation (New Jersey, United States) by Brownstein (2018).
- Partial tibia of a tyrannosauroid theropod, possibly a relative of Bistahieversor sealeyi, is described from the Upper Cretaceous (Maastrichtian) Navesink Formation (New Jersey, United States) by Brownstein (2018).
- A metatarsal bone of a young tyrannosaurid theropod, marked with several long grooves interpreted as tooth traces of a large tyrannosaurid, is described from the Upper Cretaceous (Maastrichtian) Lance Formation (Wyoming, United States) by McLain et al. (2018).
- A study on the jaw musculature of Tyrannosaurus rex, and its importance for reconstructions of the bite force of this species, is published by Bates & Falkingham (2018).
- A study on the ornithomimosaur fossils from the Lower Cretaceous Arundel Clay (Maryland, United States) published by Brownstein (2017), interpreting the fossils as indicative of the presence of two ornithomimosaur taxa in the Arundel, is criticized by McFeeters, Ryan & Cullen (2018).
- A study on the diversity of ornithomimosaur dinosaurs from the Upper Cretaceous Nemegt Formation (Mongolia) as indicated by the morphology of their manus bones is published by Chinzorig et al. (2018).
- A study on the putative beta-keratin antibodies reported in a fossil specimen of Shuvuuia deserti by Schweitzer et al. (1999) is published by Saitta et al. (2018), who interpret their findings as inconsistent with any protein or other original organic substance preservation in the Shuvuuia fiber.
- Probable therizinosauroid eggs are described from the Upper Cretaceous Hongtuya Formation (China) by Ren et al. (2018).
- A study on the anatomy of the basicranium of Nothronychus mckinleyi, and its implications for reconstructing the soft tissues of this species, is published by Smith, Sanders & Wolfe (2018).
- A study on egg clutches produced by oviraptorosaur theropods representing a large body size range, evaluating their implications for inferring how oviraptorosaurs of different body size incubated their eggs, is published by Tanaka et al. (2018).
- A study evaluating the potential of the wings of Caudipteryx to produce small aerodynamic forces during terrestrial locomotion is published by Talori et al. (2018).
- A study on the morphology of the dentary of a member of the genus Caenagnathasia from the Upper Cretaceous (Turonian) Bissekty Formation (Uzbekistan) is published by Wang, Zhang & Yang (2018).
- A small caenagnathid tibia is described from the Upper Cretaceous (Maastrichtian) Horseshoe Canyon Formation (Alberta, Canada) by Funston & Currie (2018).
- New specimen of Citipati osmolskae preserved in a brooding position atop a nest of eggs is described from Ukhaa Tolgod (Mongolia) by Norell et al. (2018).
- Description of endocasts of Citipati osmolskae and Khaan mckennai, and a study on their implications for inferring the course of oviraptorosaur brain evolution and how it relates to the origin of the modern bird brain, is published by Balanoff et al. (2018).
- Redescription of Hulsanpes perlei and a study on the phylogenetic relationships of this species is published by Cau & Madzia (2018).
- Description of the anatomy of the postcranial skeleton of a newly discovered specimen of Buitreraptor gonzalezorum is published by Novas et al. (2018).
- A study on the tail anatomy of Buitreraptor gonzalezorum is published by Motta, Brissón Egli & Novas (2018).
- Description of the anatomy of the postcranial skeleton of Buitreraptor gonzalezorum based on the holotype and referred specimens is published by Gianechini et al. (2018).
- A tooth of a large dromaeosaurid theropod, intermediate in size between those of smaller dromaeosaurids like Saurornitholestes and gigantic forms like Dakotaraptor, is described from the middle Campanian Tar Heel Formation (North Carolina, United States) by Brownstein (2018).
- New specimen of Sinovenator changii, including a nearly complete skull and providing new information on the anatomy of the skull of this species, is described from the Lower Cretaceous Yixian Formation (China) by Yin, Pei & Zhou (2018).
- A study on the incubation period and incubation strategy of Troodon formosus is published by Varricchio, Kundrát & Hogan (2018).
- Description of two new specimens of Anchiornis huxleyi and a study on the phylogenetic relationships of the species is published by Guo, Xu & Jia (2018).
- Apparent gastric pellets of Anchiornis are described by Zheng et al. (2018).
- A study on the evolution of the anatomy of the braincase of sauropodomorph dinosaurs is published by Bronzati, Benson & Rauhut (2018).
- Otero (2018) presents the inferred shoulder and forelimb musculature of sauropodomorph dinosaurs, as inferred by comparisons with living crocodiles and birds.
- A study evaluating how hindlimb musculature of sauropodomorph dinosaurs was affected by the development of a quadrupedal stance from a bipedal one, and later in the transition from a narrow-gauge to a wide-gauge stance, is published by Klinkhamer et al. (2018).
- New specimen of Buriolestes schultzi, providing additional information on the anatomy of this species, is described from the Upper Triassic Santa Maria Formation (Brazil) by Müller et al. (2018).
- Fossil of a basal sauropodomorph dinosaur (more similar to Norian forms such as Pantydraco caducus and Unaysaurus tolentinoi than to Carnian taxa such as Saturnalia tupiniquim and Pampadromaeus barberenai) found in the Triassic locality in Brazil which also yielded the fossils of Sacisaurus agudoensis are described by Marsola et al. (2018).
- Redescription of the anatomy of the braincase of Efraasia minor is published by Bronzati & Rauhut (2018).
- A study on the anatomy and phylogenetic relationships of Sarahsaurus aurifontanalis is published by Marsh & Rowe (2018).
- A study on the anatomy of the skull of Massospondylus carinatus is published by Chapelle & Choiniere (2018).
- Xing et al. (2018) describe a bone abnormality in a rib of a specimen of Lufengosaurus huenei from the Lower Jurassic Fengjiahe Formation (China), possibly caused by a failed predator attack.
- A study on the osteology of the sauropodomorph Pulanesaura eocollum is published by Mcphee & Choiniere (2018).
- A study on the microstructure of the long bones of Antetonitrus ingenipes is published by Krupandan, Chinsamy-Turan & Pol (2018).
- A study on the geological age of the type locality of Vulcanodon karibaensis is published by Viglietti et al. (2018), who interpret Vulcanodon as likely to be Sinemurian–Pliensbachian in age, and potentially ~10–15 million years older than previously thought. This makes it the oldest known sauropod.
- Two neck vertebrae of a eusauropod sauropod dinosaur are described from a new Early Jurassic locality in the Haute Moulouya Basin (Morocco) by Nicholl, Mannion & Barrett (2018), representing some of the earliest eusauropod fossils reported so far.
- A study on the phylogenetic relationships of basal members of Eusauropoda from the Early-Middle Jurassic of Patagonia, Argentina is published by Holwerda & Pol (2018).
- A study on the age of the Lower Shaximiao Formation of the Sichuan Basin, southwest China (preserving abundant sauropod fossils, including the Shunosaurus-Omeisaurus fauna) is published by Wang et al. (2018).
- Redescription of the complete series of the neck vertebrae of Xinjiangtitan shanshanesis is published online by Zhang et al. (2018).
- A study on the skull anatomy of Bellusaurus sui is published by Moore et al. (2018).
- Description of a skull of a juvenile sauropod belonging or related to the genus Diplodocus from the Upper Jurassic Morrison Formation (Montana, United States), representing the smallest diplodocid skull reported so far, and a study on the implications of this finding for inferring the ontogeny of the skull of diplodocids, is published by Woodruff et al. (2018).
- Exquisitely preserved new skull of a diplodocid sauropod is described from the Upper Jurassic Morrison Formation (Wyoming, United States) by Tschopp, Mateus & Norell (2018), providing new information on the morphology of diplodocid skulls, and indicating presence of overlapping joints between the maxilla, jugal, quadratojugal and the lacrimal, permitting limited anterior sliding movement of the snout.
- Xenoposeidon proneneukos is assigned to the family Rebbachisauridae by Taylor (2018).
- Partial sauropod (probably brachiosaurid) pes is described from the Upper Jurassic Morrison Formation in the Black Hills in Wyoming (United States) by Maltese et al. (2018), representing the largest sauropod pes described to date.
- A sauropod footprint assigned to the ichnogenus Brontopodus, produced by a trackmaker of the size exceeding that of any Mongolian dinosaur reported so far from skeletal material, is described from the Upper Cretaceous Nemegt Formation (Mongolia) by Stettner, Persons & Currie (2018).
- A study on sauropod tracks from the Cal Orck'o tracksite in the Maastrichtian El Molino Formation (Bolivia) is published by Meyer, Marty & Belvedere (2018), who name a new ichnotaxon Calorckosauripus lazari, interpreted by the authors as tracks produced by a basal titanosaur.
- A study on the bone histology of Rapetosaurus krausei is published by Curry Rogers & Kulik (2018).
- New titanosaur fossil material is described from the Upper Cretaceous Río Huaco Formation and Los Llanos Formation (La Rioja Province, Argentina) by Hechenleitner et al. (2018).
- A study on the mechanical strength of the unusually thick shells of the titanosaur eggs from the Sanagasta nesting site (La Rioja, Argentina), evaluating the required force to break them from inside, is published by Hechenleitner et al. (2018), who interpret their findings as indicating that thinning of outer eggshells was necessary for successful hatchings.
- Description of new fossil material of Atsinganosaurus velauciensis from the Upper Cretaceous Argiles et Grès à Reptiles Formation (France) and a study on the phylogenetic relationships of this species is published by Díez Díaz et al. (2018).
- Ibiricu, Martínez & Casal (2018) present the reconstruction of the pelvic and hindlimb musculature of Epachthosaurus sciuttoi.
- A redescription of Mendozasaurus neguyelap based on previously undocumented remains and a study on the phylogenetic relationships of the species is published by Gonzàlez Riga et al. (2018).
- Postcranial remains attributable to the holotype specimen of Nemegtosaurus mongoliensis are described from the Upper Cretaceous Nemegt Formation (Mongolia) by Currie et al. (2018), who consider Opisthocoelicaudia skarzynskii to be a probable junior synonym of N. mongoliensis.
- A study on the morphology of sauropod teeth from the Cenomanian of Morocco and Algeria, comparing them to contemporaneous Cretaceous sauropod tooth morphotypes (including sauropod teeth from Africa and southern Europe), is published by Holwerda et al. (2018).
- New reconstruction of the jaw musculature of ornithischian dinosaurs, rejecting the notion of presence of novel "cheek" muscle, is proposed by Nabavizadeh (2018).
- A study on the heterodontosaurid fossils from the Early Jurassic of Argentina described by Becerra et al. (2016), aiming to estimate the body size of the animal, is published by Becerra & Ramírez (2018).
- A study on the teeth of Manidens condorensis, based on new material indicative of a strong heterodonty and a novel occlusion type previously unreported in herbivorous dinosaurs, is published by Becerra et al. (2018).
- Redescription of Gigantspinosaurus sichuanensis and a study on the phylogenetic relationships of the species is published by Hao et al. (2018).
- A study on pathological characteristics of the left femur of a specimen of Gigantspinosaurus sichuanensis from the Late Jurassic of China is published online by Hao et al. (2018), who interpret this specimen as probably affected by a bone tumor.
- New specimen of Hesperosaurus mjosi, providing new information on the anatomy of the species and indicating that H. mjosi might have been a smaller species than Stegosaurus stenops, is described from the Upper Jurassic Morrison Formation (Montana, United States) by Maidment, Woodruff & Horner (2018).
- Redescription of the fossil material referred to Paranthodon africanus and a study on the phylogenetic relationships of this species is published by Raven & Maidment (2018).
- Probable ankylosaurian footprints are described from the Upper Jurassic Guará Formation (Brazil) by Francischini et al. (2018).
- Probable ankylosaurian footprints assigned to the ichnogenus Tetrapodosaurus are described from the Middle Jurassic (Bajocian) Zorrillo-Taberna Indifferenciadas Formation (Mexico) by Rodríguez-de la Rosa et al. (2018), representing the oldest ankylosaurian ichnofossils reported so far.
- A study aiming to test the hypothesis that convoluted nasal passages of ankylosaurs were efficient heat exchangers is published by Bourke, Porter & Witmer (2018).
- A study on the neuroanatomy of ankylosaurid dinosaurs based on skull endocasts of Talarurus plicatospineus and Tarchia teresae is published by Paulina-Carabajal et al. (2018).
- A survey of ankylosaur occurrences in the Cretaceous deposits of Alberta (Canada) and a study looking for explanation of numerous instances of ankylosaur specimens preserved overturned is published by Mallon et al. (2018).
- A study on the teeth histology and development in Changchunsaurus parvus is published by Chen et al. (2018).
- Parksosaurid tooth and vertebral centrum is described from the Campanian of the Cerro del Pueblo Formation by Rivera-Sylva et al. (2018), representing the first record of this family from Mexico.
- A study on the bone microstructure and ontogeny of basal ornithopod specimens from the Early Cretaceous of Australia is published by Woodward, Rich & Vickers-Rich (2018), who reinterpret the tracks as produced in non-marine environment.
- A toe bone of an ornithopod dinosaur is described from the Albian Hudspeth Formation (Oregon, United States) by Retallack et al. (2018), representing the first diagnostic nonavian dinosaur fossil from Oregon.
- A study on the ontogenetic changes in the postcranial skeleton of Dysalotosaurus lettowvorbecki is published by Hübner (2018).
- A study on the holotype specimen of Riabininohadros weberae, revealing previously unknown elements of the femur, astragalus and calcaneus, is published by Lopatin, Averianov & Alifanov (2018), who also report the second dinosaur specimen from the Maastrichtian of Crimea, a fragmentary skeleton of an advanced iguanodontid or primitive hadrosauroid ornithopod.
- A redescription of Iguanodon galvensis and a study on the phylogenetic relationships of the species is published by Verdú et al. (2018).
- Microfossil remains of Early Cretaceous grasses extracted from a specimen of Equijubus normani are described by Wu, You & Li (2018).
- A study on the phylogenetic relationships of Nipponosaurus sachalinensis is published by Takasaki et al. (2018).
- A study on the osteology, histology and taxonomy of the Maastrichtian hadrosauroid specimens from the Basturs Poble bonebed (Spain) is published by Fondevilla et al. (2018).
- A study on the anatomy of the perinatal specimens of Maiasaura peeblesorum from the Campanian Two Medicine Formation (Montana, United States), and on their implications for understanding of the morphological changes in the skeletons of members of this species that took place in their early growth stages, is published by Prieto-Marquez & Guenther (2018).
- Description of the morphology of the braincase of Secernosaurus koerneri is published by Becerra et al. (2018).
- A hadrosaurid nestling belonging to the genus Edmontosaurus is described from the Upper Cretaceous (Maastrichtian) Hell Creek Formation (Montana), United States) by Wosik, Goodwin & Evans (2018), who interpret its anatomy as indicating that it was capable of fully quadrupedal locomotion.
- Partial sacrum of a hadrosaurid dinosaur is described from the Campanian Cape Sebastian Sandstone (Oregon, United States) by Taylor & Lucas (2018).
- A study on the differences in shape and structural performance of the lower jaws of ceratopsians is published by Maiorino et al. (2018).
- A study evaluating whether skull ornaments of ceratopsians might have helped members of closely related sympatric species differentiate themselves is published by Knapp et al. (2018).
- A description of the anatomy of the postcranial skeleton of Yinlong downsi and a study on the phylogenetic relationships of basal ornithischians is published by Han et al. (2018).
- A study on the morphology of the joint of the occipital skull region and the first two cervical vertebrae of Psittacosaurus sibiricus is published by Podlesnov (2018).
- A study on the dental morphology and tooth replacement in Liaoceratops yanzigouensis is published by He et al. (2018).
- A study on the ontogenetic changes of the bone microstructure in Protoceratops andrewsi and their implications for the biology of this species is published by Fostowicz-Frelik & Słowiak (2018).
- A study on the differences of shape of cervical vertebrae of different specimens of Protoceratops andrewsi is published by Tereschenko (2018).
- Two isolated ceratopsid horncores are described from the Upper Cretaceous (Campanian, ~78.5 million years ago) Foremost Formation (Alberta, Canada) by Brown (2018), representing some of the earliest ceratopsid fossils reported so far.
- Description of new fossil material of Medusaceratops lokii from the Upper Cretaceous Campanian Judith River Formation (Montana, United States) and a study on the phylogenetic relationships of the species is published by Chiba et al. (2018).
- Small marks interpreted as feeding traces are described from a partial frill of a juvenile specimen of Centrosaurus apertus from the Dinosaur Park Formation (Alberta, Canada) by Hone, Tanke & Brown (2018).
- Description of three partial chasmosaurine skulls collected from the Dinosaur Park Formation, and age-equivalent sediments of the uppermost Oldman Formation, of southern Alberta (Canada) is published by Campbell et al. (2018).
- A study on the ecological diversity of Cretaceous herbivorous dinosaurs leading up to the Cretaceous–Paleogene extinction event, as indicated by jaw and teeth morphology, is published by Nordén et al. (2018).
- A comment on the study of Baron & Barrett (which reassessed the phylogenetic relationships of Chilesaurus diegosuarezi) is published by Müller et al.(2018).
- A study on the taphonomical effects of sedimentary compression on the iliac morphology of early dinosaurs, using basal sauropodomorph specimens as a model is published by Müller, Garcia, Da-Rosa & Dias-da-Silva (2018).

== New taxa ==
Name	Novelty	Status	Authors	Age	Unit	Location	Notes	Images
Acantholipan	Gen. et sp. nov	Valid	Rivera-Sylva et al.	Late Cretaceous (Santonian)	Pen Formation	Mexico	A member of the family Nodosauridae. Genus includes new species A. gonzalezi.	
Adynomosaurus	Gen. et sp. nov	Valid	Prieto-Márquez et al.	Late Cretaceous	Tremp Formation	Spain	A hadrosaurid ornithopod belonging to the subfamily Lambeosaurinae. Genus includes new species A. arcanus. Announced in 2018; the final version of the article naming it was published in 2019.	
Akainacephalus	Gen. et sp. nov	Valid	Wiersma & Irmis	Late Cretaceous (late Campanian)	Kaiparowits Formation	United States (Utah)	A member of the family Ankylosauridae. The type species is A. johnsoni.	
Anhuilong	Gen. et sp. nov	Valid	Ren, Huang & You	Middle Jurassic	Hongqin Formation	China	A mamenchisaurid sauropod. Genus includes new species A. diboensis. Announced in 2018; the final version of the article naming it was published in 2020.	
Anodontosaurus inceptus	Sp. nov	Valid	Penkalski	Late Cretaceous	Dinosaur Park Formation	Canada (Alberta)	A member of the family Ankylosauridae.	
Anomalipes	Gen. et sp. nov	Valid	Yu et al.	Late Cretaceous	Wangshi Group	China	A caenagnathid theropod. The type species is A. zhaoi.	Preserved pedal elements
Arkansaurus	Gen. et sp. nov	Valid	Hunt & Quinn	Early Cretaceous (Albian–Aptian)	Trinity Group	United States (Arkansas)	An ornithomimosaur theropod. Genus includes new species A. fridayi.	Reconstruction of Arkansaurus fridayi
Avimimus nemegtensis	Sp. nov	Valid	Funston et al.	Late Cretaceous	Nemegt Formation	Mongolia	An oviraptorosaurian. Announced in 2017; the final version of the article naming it was published in 2018.	
Baalsaurus	Gen. et sp. nov	Valid	Calvo & Riga	Late Cretaceous (Turonian-Coniacian)	Portezuelo Formation	Argentina	A titanosaur sauropod. The type species is B. mansillai.	
Bagualosaurus	Gen. et sp. nov	Valid	Pretto, Langer & Schultz	Late Triassic	Santa Maria Formation	Brazil	An early member of Sauropodomorpha. Genus includes new species B. agudoensis.	Reconstruction of Bagualosaurus agudoensis
Bannykus	Gen. et sp. nov	Valid	Xu et al.	Early Cretaceous (Aptian)	Bayin-Gobi Formation	China	An alvarezsaurian theropod. The type species is B. wulatensis.	Reconstruction of Bannykus wulatensis
Bayannurosaurus	Gen. et sp. nov	Valid	Xu et al.	Early Cretaceous	Bayin-Gobi Formation	China	A non-hadrosauriform ankylopollexian ornithopod. Genus includes new species B. perfectus.	
Caihong	Gen. et sp. nov	Valid	Hu et al.	Late Jurassic (Oxfordian)	Tiaojishan Formation	China	A paravian theropod. The type species is C. juji.	Reconstruction of Caihong juji
Choconsaurus	Gen. et sp. nov	Valid	Simón, Salgado & Calvo	Late Cretaceous (Cenomanian)	Huincul Formation	Argentina	A titanosaur sauropod. The type species is C. baileywillisi. Announced in 2017; the final version of the article naming it was published in 2018.	
Choyrodon	Gen. et sp. nov	Valid	Gates et al.	Early Cretaceous (Albian)	Khuren Dukh Formation	Mongolia	An iguanodontian ornithopod. The type species is C. barsboldi.	Holotype skull
Crittendenceratops	Gen. et sp. nov	Valid	Dalman et al.	Late Cretaceous (Campanian)	Fort Crittenden Formation	United States (Arizona)	A centrosaurine ceratopsid dinosaur belonging to the tribe Nasutoceratopsini. The type species is C. krzyzanowskii.	Reconstruction of Crittendenceratops krzyzanowskii
Diluvicursor	Gen. et sp. nov	Valid	Herne et al.	Early Cretaceous (Albian)	Eumeralla Formation	Australia	A small-bodied ornithopod. The type species is D. pickeringi.	Reconstruction of Diluvicursor pickeringi
Dryosaurus elderae	Sp. nov	Valid	Carpenter & Galton	Late Jurassic	Morrison Formation	United States (Utah)		Holotype skull cast
Dynamoterror	Gen. et sp. nov	Valid	McDonald, Wolfe & Dooley	Late Cretaceous (early Campanian)	Menefee Formation	United States (New Mexico)	A tyrannosaurid theropod. The type species D. dynastes.	Frontal bones
Ingentia	Gen. et sp. nov	Valid	Apaldetti et al.	Late Triassic (late Norian–Rhaetian)	Quebrada del Barro Formation	Argentina	An early member of Sauropodomorpha related to Lessemsaurus. Genus includes new species I. prima.	Size comparison
Invictarx	Gen. et sp. nov	Valid	McDonald & Wolfe	Late Cretaceous (early Campanian)	Menefee Formation	United States (New Mexico)	A member of the family Nodosauridae. The type species is I. zephyri.	Osteoderms
Jinyunpelta	Gen. et sp. nov		Zheng et al.	Cretaceous (Albian–Cenomanian)	Liangtoutang Formation	China	A member of the family Ankylosauridae belonging to the subfamily Ankylosaurinae. The type species is J. sinensis.	Reconstruction of Jinyunpelta sinensis
Lavocatisaurus	Gen. et sp. nov	Valid	Canudo et al.	Early Cretaceous (Aptian–early Albian)	Rayoso Formation	Argentina	A rebbachisaurid sauropod. The type species is L. agrioensis.	Reconstruction of Lavocatisaurus agrioensis
Ledumahadi	Gen. et sp. nov	Valid	McPhee et al.	Early Jurassic (Hettangian-Sinemurian)	Elliot Formation	South Africa	An early member of Sauropodiformes. The type species is L. mafube.	Reconstruction of Ledumahadi mafube
Liaoningotitan	Gen. et sp. nov	Valid	Zhou et al.	Early Cretaceous	Yixian Formation	China	A titanosauriform sauropod. The type species is L. sinensis.	
Lingwulong	Gen. et sp. nov	Valid	Xu et al.	Late Early to early Middle Jurassic (late Toarcian–Bajocian)	Yanan Formation	China	A dicraeosaurid sauropod. The type species is L. shenqi.	Reconstruction of Lingwulong shenqi
Macrocollum	Gen. et sp. nov	Valid	Müller, Langer & Dias-da-Silva	Late Triassic (early Norian)	Caturrita Formation	Brazil	An early member of Sauropodomorpha related to Unaysaurus. Genus includes new species M. itaquii.	Reconstruction of Macrocollum itaquii
Mansourasaurus	Gen. et sp. nov	Valid	Sallam et al.	Late Cretaceous (Campanian)	Quseir Formation	Egypt	A titanosaur sauropod. The type species is M. shahinae.	Reconstruction of Mansourasaurus shahinae
Maraapunisaurus	Gen. et comb. nov	Valid	Carpenter	Late Jurassic (Kimmeridgian—Tithonian)	Morrison Formation	United States (Colorado)	A rebbachisaurid sauropod; a new genus for "Amphicoelias" fragillimus Cope (1878f).	Speculative skeletal reconstruction
Mongolostegus	Gen. et sp. nov	Valid	Tumanova & Alifanov	Early Cretaceous (Aptian–Albian)	Dzunbain Formation	Mongolia	A member of Stegosauria. Genus includes new species M. exspectabilis.	Skeletal reconstruction
Pilmatueia	Gen. et sp. nov	Valid	Coria et al.	Early Cretaceous (Valanginian)	Mulichinco Formation	Argentina	A dicraeosaurid sauropod. The type species is P. faundezi. Announced in 2018; the final version of the article naming it was published in 2019.	Skeletal reconstruction
Platypelta	Gen. et sp. nov	Valid	Penkalski	Late Cretaceous	Dinosaur Park Formation	Canada (Alberta)	A member of the family Ankylosauridae. Genus includes new species P. coombsi.	Skull of AMNH 5337, the holotype specimen of Platypelta coombsi
Qiupanykus	Gen. et sp. nov	Valid	Lü et al.	Late Cretaceous (Maastrichtian)	Qiupa Formation	China	An alvarezsaurid theropod. The type species is Q. zhangi.	
Saltriovenator	Gen. et sp. nov	Valid	Dal Sasso et al.	Early Jurassic (Sinemurian)	Saltrio Formation	Italy	A ceratosaurian theropod. The type species is S. zanellai.	Reconstruction of Saltriovenator zanellai
Scolosaurus thronus	Sp. nov	Valid	Penkalski	Late Cretaceous	Dinosaur Park Formation	Canada (Alberta)	A member of the family Ankylosauridae.	Skull of ROM 1930, the holotype specimen of Scolosaurus thronus
Sibirotitan	Gen. et sp. nov	Valid	Averianov et al.	Early Cretaceous (probably Barremian)	Ilek Formation	Russia	A non-titanosaurian somphospondyl sauropod. Genus includes new species S. astrosacralis.	Reconstructed model
Thanos	Gen. et sp. nov	Valid	Delcourt & Iori	Late Cretaceous (Santonian)	São José do Rio Preto Formation	Brazil	An abelisaurid theropod. Genus includes new species T. simonattoi. Announced in 2018; the final version of the article naming it was published in 2020.	Speculative reconstruction
Tratayenia	Gen. et sp. nov	Valid	Porfiri et al.	Late Cretaceous (Santonian)	Bajo de la Carpa Formation	Argentina	A megaraptoran theropod. Genus includes new species T. rosalesi.	Reconstructed model
Volgatitan	Gen. et sp. nov	Valid	Averianov & Efimov	Early Cretaceous (Hauterivian)		Russia (Ulyanovsk Oblast)	A titanosaur sauropod related to members of the group Lognkosauria. The type species is V. simbirskiensis.	Skeletal reconstruction
Weewarrasaurus	Gen. et sp. nov	Valid	Bell et al.	Late Cretaceous (Cenomanian)	Griman Creek Formation	Australia	A small-bodied non-iguanodontian ornithopod. The type species is W. pobeni.	Holotype dentary
Xiyunykus	Gen. et sp. nov	Valid	Xu et al.	Early Cretaceous (Barremian-Aptian?)	Tugulu Group	China	An alvarezsaurian theropod. The type species is X. pengi.	Reconstruction of Xiyunykus pengi
Yizhousaurus	Gen. et sp. nov		Zhang et al.	Early Jurassic	Lufeng Formation	China	An early member of Sauropodiformes. The type species is Y. sunae.	Holotype skull and jaw
