= El Molino Formation =

Geological formation in Bolivia

- Stratigraphic range: Maastrichtian; ~70–66 Ma
- Type: Geological formation
- Unit of: Puca Group
- Underlies: Santa Lucía Formation
- Overlies: Chaunaca Formation

Lithology
- Primary: Sandstone
- Other: Limestone

Location
- Coordinates: 19.5°S 65.8°W
- Approximate paleocoordinates: 22.0°S 51.8°W
- Region: Cochabamba, Chuquisaca & Potosí Departments
- Country: Bolivia
- Extent: Altiplano & Potosí Basins
- El Molino Formation (Bolivia)

The El Molino Formation is a Maastrichtian geologic formation pertaining to the Puca Group of central Bolivia. The formation comprises fine-grained sandstones and sandy limestones with stromatolites deposited in a shallow marine to lacustrine environment. The formation has provided fossils of Dolichochampsa minima, and ichnofossils of Ankylosauria indet., Ornithopoda indet., Theropoda indet. and Titanosauridae indet. The tracksite of Cal Orcko is the best known example of the ichnofossil locations of the formation. The ichnofossil of Ligabueichnum bolivianum may be attributed to an ankylosaur. The fossil fish species Dasyatis molinoensis is named after the formation. Giant theropod footprints over 1 metre (39 in) in length have been discovered in the formation,suggested to come from Megaraptorans more than 12 m in length.

== Fossil content ==
Other fossils retrieved from the formation are:

- Coelodus toncoensis
- Dagetella sudamericana
- Dasyatis branisai, D. molinoensis, D. schaefferi
- Gasteroclupea branisai
- Ischyrhiza hartenbergeri
- Latinopollia suarezi
- Lepidotyle enigmatica
- Ligabueichnum bolivianum
- Noterpeton bolivianum
- Phaerodusichthys taverni
- Pucabatis hoffstetteri
- Pucapristis branisi
- Stephanodus minimus
- Lepidosiren cf. paradoxa
- Andinichthys sp.
- Ceratodus sp.
- Enchodus sp.
- Lepisosteus sp.
- Pucalithus sp.
- Rhineastes sp.
- Santosius sp.
- Anura indet.
- Coelurosauria indet.
- Crocodylia indet.
- Dryolestidae indet.
- Eutheria indet.
- cf. Cyprinodontiformes indet.
- Gymnophiona indet.
- Heterotidinae indet.
- ?Madtsoiidae indet.
- Podocnemididae indet.
- Pycnodontidae indet.
- Sauropoda indet.
- Siluriformes indet.
- Tetragonopterinae indet.

== See also ==
- List of fossiliferous stratigraphic units in Bolivia
- List of stratigraphic units with dinosaur tracks
  - List of stratigraphic units with theropod tracks
- Cajones Formation
- Chaunaca Formation
- La Puerta Formation
- Toro Toro Formation
