= Toro Toro Formation =

Geologic Formation of the Puca Group in Bolivia

- Stratigraphic range: Late Campanian; ~80–71 Ma
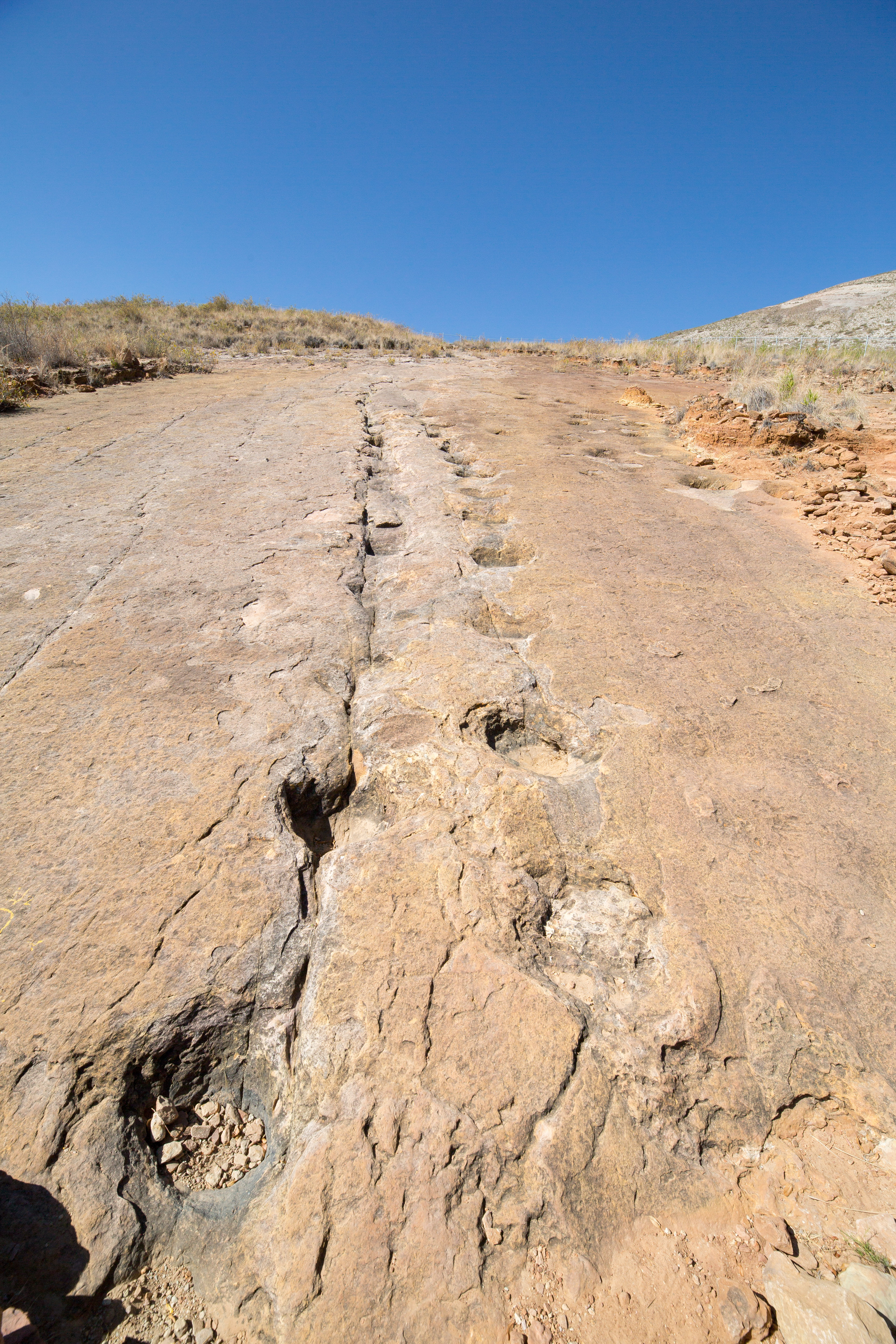
- Dinosaur ichnofossils in the Toro Toro Formation
- Type: Geological formation
- Unit of: Puca Group

Lithology
- Primary: Sandstone
- Other: Mudstone, gypsum

Location
- Coordinates: 18.1°S 65.8°W
- Approximate paleocoordinates: 21.3°S 47.8°W
- Region: Cochabamba Department
- Country: Bolivia
- Extent: Potosí Basin

Type section
- Named for: Torotoro National Park
- Toro Toro Formation (Bolivia)

The Toro Toro Formation is a Late Campanian geologic formation pertaining to the Puca Group of central Bolivia. The porous yellowish medium-to-coarse grained ferruginous (iron-containing) sandstones and mudstones with gypsum intercalations, deposited in a beach environment, preserve many ichnofossils of Ligabueichnium bolivianum, Dromaeopodus sp., Ornithopoda indet., Theropoda indet. and Titanosauridae indet. The formation has provided the earliest known tracksite of dinosaurs in Bolivia. The Toro Toro Formation represents part of the postrift stage in an alluvial to deltaic environment within the Potosí Basin. The formation is a local equivalent of the Chaunaca Formation. The most famous of the dinosaur tracksites is Cal Orcko, however these are in the El Molino Formation

== See also ==
- List of fossiliferous stratigraphic units in Bolivia
- List of stratigraphic units with dinosaur tracks
  - List of stratigraphic units with theropod tracks
- Cajones Formation
- La Puerta Formation
