= Yacoraite Formation =

Geologic formation in Argentina

- Stratigraphic range: Maastrichtian-Danian
- Type: Geological formation
- Unit of: Salta Group
- Sub-units: Amblayo, Güemes, Alemanía & Juramento Members
- Underlies: Mealla, Olmedo & Tunal Formations
- Overlies: Lecho Formation

Lithology
- Primary: Sandstone
- Other: Limestone

Location
- Coordinates: 23.5°S 65.4°W
- Approximate paleocoordinates: 26.1°S 51.9°W
- Region: Jujuy & Salta Provinces
- Country: Argentina
- Extent: Salta Basin

Type section
- Named for: Yacoraite village, Tilcara Department
- Yacoraite Formation (Argentina)

The Yacoraite Formation is a largely Mesozoic geologic formation. The deposits of this formation mainly date from the Maastrichtian of the Upper Cretaceous, but the Cretaceous–Paleogene boundary (K–T boundary) runs right through this formation near its top, and the uppermost parts are consequently from the Danian (Lower Paleocene). It was probably deposited around the intertidal zone, as the sedimentary rocks of this formation alternate according to sea level changes between deposits of muddy beaches and of shallow ocean.

== Fossil content ==
Dinosaur remains are among the fossils that have been recovered from the formation.

Well-preserved dinosaur footprints assigned to Hadrosaurichnus australis have been found in this formation, as were fossil eggs, stromatolites and the Mesozoic palynomorph Aquilapollenites.

Other fossils recovered from the formation are:

- Pucapristis branisi
- Gasteroclupea branisai
- Coelodus toncoensis
- Dolichochampsa minima

Ichnofossils

- Brasilichnium cf. saltatorium
- Hadrosaurichnus australis
- Salfitichnus mentoor
- Taponichnus donottoi
- Telosichnus saltensis
- Yacoraitichnus avis

== See also ==
- List of dinosaur-bearing rock formations
  - List of stratigraphic units with indeterminate dinosaur fossils
