= Silver Sands =

Silver Sands may refer to:

- Silver Sands, Alberta, a summer village in Alberta, Canada
- Silver Sands, South Australia, a beach and holiday resort south of Aldinga Beach, South Australia
- Silver Sands, United Kingdom, a part of the River Thames
- Silver Sands, Western Australia, a suburb of Mandurah, Western Australia
- Silver Sands, Western Cape, a coastal town in South Africa
- Silver Sands FC, a football club in Christ Church, Barbados
- Silver Sands State Park, a recreation area in Milford, Connecticut, US

== See also ==
- Silver Sand, a mining project in Bolivia
- Silver sand, a fine white sand used in gardening
- "White Silver Sands", a song written in 1957 by Charles 'Red' Matthews
