= El Jume Formation =

Geologic formation in Argentina

- Stratigraphic range: Early Cretaceous
- Type: Geological formation
- Unit of: El Gigante Group
- Underlies: El Toscal Formation
- Overlies: Los Riscos Formation

Lithology
- Primary: Sandstone, claystone

Location
- Coordinates: 31°43′S 67°16′W
- Region: San Luis Province
- Country: Argentina
- Extent: Marayes-El Carrizal Basin
- El Jume Formation (Argentina)

The El Jume Formation is an Early Cretaceous geologic formation in Argentina. Indeterminate fossil dinosaur tracks have been reported from the formation. The formation, belonging to the El Gigante Group, overlies the Los Riscos Formation and is overlain by the El Toscal Formation. The sandstones and claystones of the formation were deposited in a fluvial environment. Part of the formation was assigned to a new formation, Balde de Leyes Formation in 2015.

== See also ==
- List of dinosaur-bearing rock formations
  - List of stratigraphic units with dinosaur tracks
    - Indeterminate dinosaur tracks
- Lagarcito Formation
- La Cruz Formation
- Quebrada del Barro Formation
