= Chota Formation =

Geologic formation in Peru

- Stratigraphic range: Early Campanian-Late Eocene; ~83–35 Ma
- Type: Geological formation
- Sub-units: Esperanza Mb. Rentema Mb. Fundo El Triunfo Mb.
- Underlies: Cajaruro Formation
- Overlies: Celendín Formation
- Thickness: 320 m (1,050 ft)

Lithology
- Primary: Shale, sandstone
- Other: Gypsum

Location
- Coordinates: 5°41′41″S 78°30′41″W
- Approximate paleocoordinates: 7.5°S 60.6°W
- Region: Cajamarca
- Country: Peru
- Extent: Bagua Basin

Type section
- Named for: Chota
- Named by: Broggi
- Location: Esperanza, Cajamarca
- Year defined: 1942
- Chota Formation (Peru)

The Chota Formation is an Early Campanian to Late Eocene geologic formation of the Cajamarca and western Amazonas Region in northern Peru. Dinosaur remains are among the fossils that have been recovered from the formation, although none have yet been referred to a specific genus ("Baguasaurus"). The formation was formerly named Bagua Formation.

== Fossil content ==
Color key: Taxon / Reclassified taxon / Taxon falsely reported as present / Dubious taxon or junior synonym / Ichnotaxon / Ootaxon / Morphotaxon	Notes; Uncertain or tentative taxa are in small text; ~~crossed out~~ taxa are discredited.

=== Dinosaurs ===
==== Sauropods ====
Sauropods of the Chota Formation
Genus	Species	Location	Stratigraphic position	Material	Notes	Images
Lithostrotia indet.	Indeterminate	Cajamarca	Campanian to Maastrichtian		A Lithostrotian titanosaur; informally known as "Baguasaurus".	

=== Crocodylomorphs ===
Crocodylomorph of the Chota Formation
Genus	Species	Location	Stratigraphic position	Material	Notes	Images
Crocodylomorpha indet.	Indeterminate	Cajamarca	Campanian to Maastrichtian	Teeth	Possibly a Notosuchia; previously known as Spinosauridae.	

=== Fish ===
Fishes of the Chota Formation
Genus	Species	Location	Stratigraphic position	Material	Notes	Images
Pucabatis	P. hoffstetteri	Cajamarca	Maastrichtian		A rhombodontid rajiform	

== See also ==
- List of dinosaur-bearing rock formations
  - List of stratigraphic units with indeterminate dinosaur fossils
