= La Puerta Formation =

La Puerta Formation may refer to:

- La Puerta Formation, Bolivia, a Late Jurassic to Early Cretaceous geologic formation in Bolivia
- La Puerta Formation, Venezuela, a fossiliferous stratigraphic unit in Venezuela
