= Quwu Formation =

Mesozoic geologic formation in China

- Type: Geological formation

Location
- Country: China

The Quwu Formation is a Mesozoic geologic formation in China. Indeterminate fossil dinosaur tracks have been reported from the formation.

== See also ==
- List of dinosaur-bearing rock formations
- List of stratigraphic units with dinosaur tracks
- Indeterminate dinosaur tracks
