= Pucabatis =

Pucabatis Temporal range: Maastrichtian ~70.6–66.043 Ma

Scientific classification
- Kingdom: Animalia
- Phylum: Chordata
- Class: Chondrichthyes
- Subclass: Elasmobranchii
- Order: Myliobatiformes
- Family: †Rhombodontidae
- Genus: †Pucabatis; Cappetta, 1975
- Species: †P. hoffstetteri

Binomial name
- †Pucabatis hoffstetteri Cappetta, 1975

Extinct genus of cartilaginous fishes

Pucabatis is a prehistoric genus of ray whose fossils are found in rocks dating from the Maastrichtian stage. The type and only species is Pucabatis hoffstetteri. Fossils of Pucabatis have been found in the El Molino Formation of Bolivia and the Bagua Formation of Peru.

== See also ==
- Flora and fauna of the Maastrichtian stage
- List of prehistoric cartilaginous fish (Chondrichthyes)
