= La Puerta Formation, Bolivia =

Late Jurassic to Early Cretaceous geologic formation of southern Bolivia

La Puerta Formation
- Stratigraphic range: Late Jurassic-Early Cretaceous; ~150–140 Ma
- Type: Geological formation

Lithology
- Primary: Sandstone

Location
- Coordinates: 19.5°S 64.8°W
- Approximate paleocoordinates: 19.6°S 31.0°W
- Region: Chuquisaca Department
- Country: Bolivia
- La Puerta Formation, Bolivia (Bolivia)

The La Puerta Formation is a Late Jurassic to Early Cretaceous geologic formation of southern Bolivia. The fluvial and eolian sandstones preserve ichnofossils of Theropoda indet., Thyreophora indet., Ankylosauria indet. and Stegosauria indet. at the Tunasniyoj tracksite. The formation is possibly a distal extension of the Botucatu Formation. The Tunasniyoj assemblage is the oldest dinosaur tracksite for Bolivia, and includes the oldest known evidence assigned to ankylosaurs and stegosaurs for South America.

The formation host the silver mineralizations of the Silver Sand mining project.

== See also ==
- List of fossiliferous stratigraphic units in Bolivia
- List of stratigraphic units with dinosaur tracks
  - List of stratigraphic units with theropod tracks
- Chaunaca Formation
- Toro Toro Formation
