= Sanbukdong Formation =

Geologic formation in South Korea

- Stratigraphic range: early Albian; 112.5 Ma
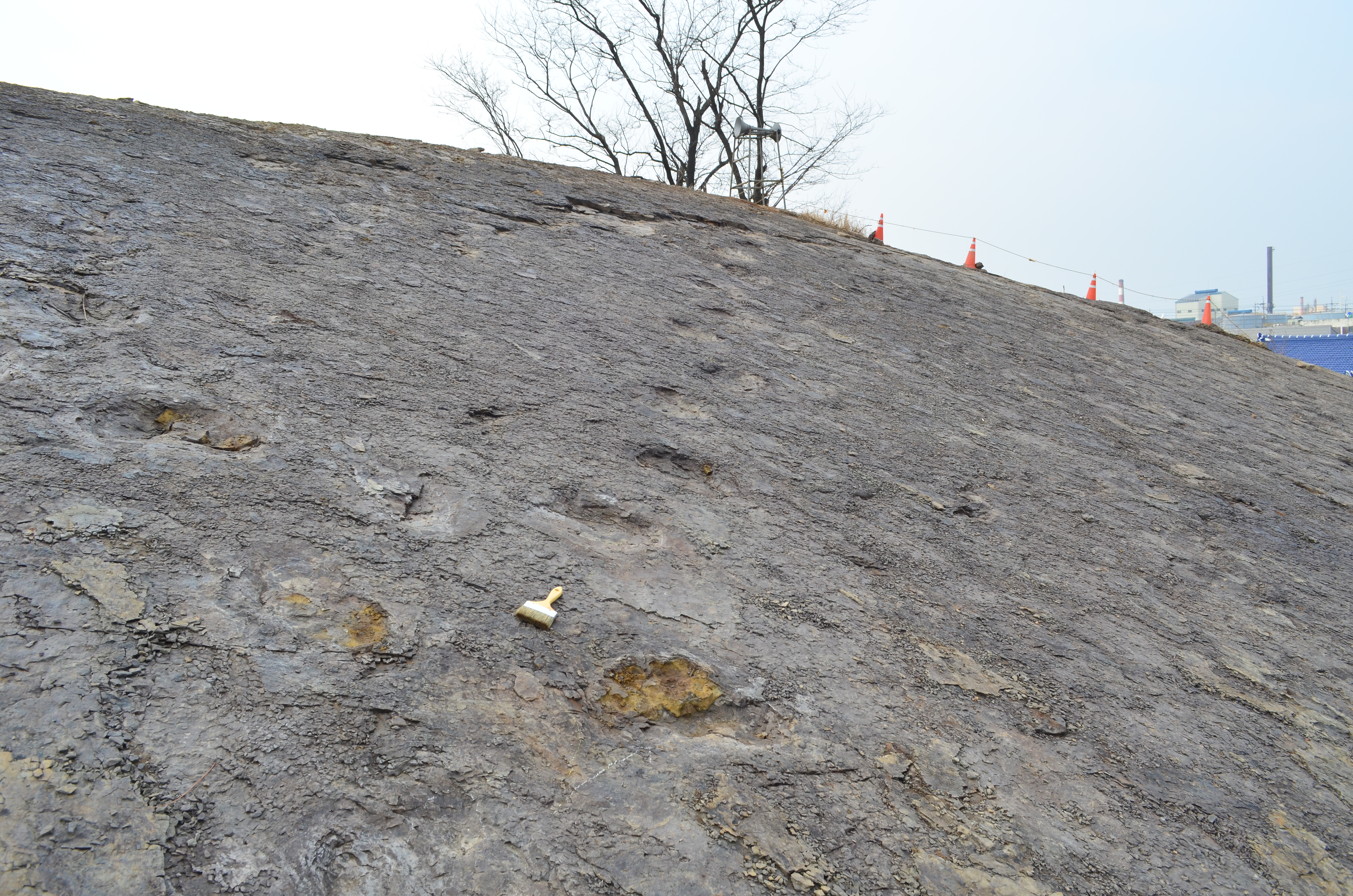
- Sanbukdong tracksite
- Type: Geological formation
- Underlies: Alluvium
- Overlies: Nansan Formation
- Thickness: Over 300 m

Lithology
- Primary: Mudstone
- Other: Sandstone

Location
- Coordinates: 35.97°N 126.65°E
- Region: North Jeolla Province
- Country: South Korea

Type section
- Named for: Sanbukdong, Gunsan
- Sanbukdong Formation (South Korea)

The Sanbukdong Formation (Korean: 산북동층; Hanja: 山北洞層; RR: Sanbukdong-cheung) is a Lower Cretaceous geologic formation in South Korea. It has been dated to the Aptian-Albian stage.

The lithology of the Sanbukdong Formation consists mostly of dark-grey mudstone, with occasional reddish mudstone and sandstone. Sedimentary structures, including ripple marks and cracks are often found. The age of the Sanbukdong Formation was initially suggested as Early Cretaceous based on plant fossil records, but Jeong et al. 2023 presented a more detailed age of this formation as 112.5±5.8 Ma based on detrital zircons, which spans from Aptian to lower Albian.

A large dinosaur tracksite is known from the formation, a total of 425 tracks including 14 trackways from 3 horizons, made by ornithopod and theropod trackmakers. The tracksite was designated as Natural Monument of Korea in 2014, entitled <Tracksite of Dinosaurs and Pterosaurs in Sanbuk-dong, Gunsan>.

== Fossil content ==
spinicaudatans and invertebrate traces are known from this formation.

=== Icnhnofossils ===
Genus	Species	Location	Stratigraphic position	Material	Notes	Images
Caririchnium		Sanbukdong tracksite		Trackways, divided into four groups based on size. The largest footprint is 51cm in length.	Entire morphology very similar to C. lotus. Ichnomorphological features suggested all tracks have been made by the same kind of trackmakers.	
Theropoda		Sanbukdong tracksite		Trackways, the largest footprint over 40 cm in length.	Entire morphology resembles Irenesauripus mclearni and I. glenrosensis. Attributable to Carcharodontosauridae trackmaker.	
Pterosauria		Sanbukdong tracksite		Tracks	Not described formally	
Koreanaornis	K. ?dodsoni; K. sp.	Unknown		Tracks	Continuous trackway consisted of 2 tracks attributed to K. ?dodsoni. Species identification of 3 isolated tracks not available.	

=== Plants ===
Plants reported from the Sanbukdong Formation
Genus	Species	Location	Stratigraphic position	Material	Notes	Images
Pseudofrenelopsis	P. sp.; P. cf. parceramosa			Leaves		
Cupressinocladus	C. sp.			Leaves		
Taxodiaceae	indeterminate			Cone structure		

== See also ==
- List of dinosaur-bearing rock formations
