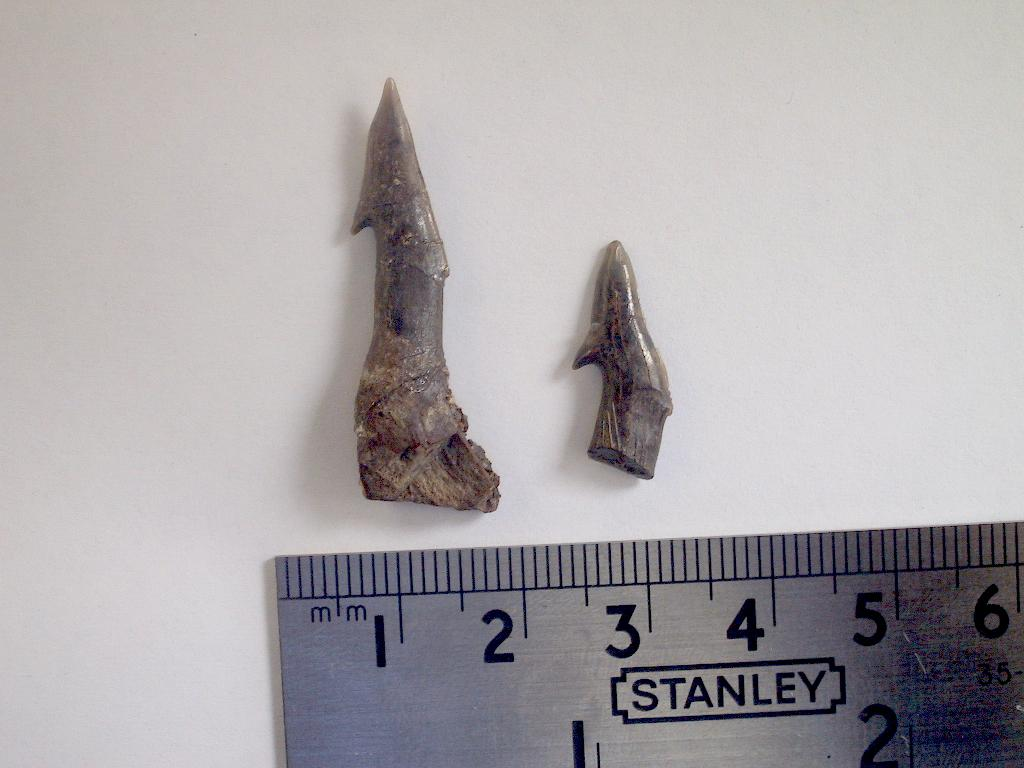
- Teeth

Scientific classification
- Domain: Eukaryota
- Kingdom: Animalia
- Phylum: Chordata
- Class: Chondrichthyes
- Subclass: Elasmobranchii
- Order: Rajiformes
- Suborder: †Sclerorhynchoidei
- Genus: †Pucapristis; Schaeffer, 1963
- Species: †P. branisi

Binomial name
- †Pucapristis branisi Schaeffer, 1963

= Pucapristis =

Pucapristis Temporal range: Maastrichtian 70–66 Ma

Genus of cartilaginous fishes

Pucapristis is a prehistoric genus of sclerorhynchoid ray whose fossils first appear in the fossil record in rocks dating from the Maastrichtian stage. The genus was described in 1963 by Schaeffer. Fossils of Pucapristis have not been found in any subsequent strata. Incidentally, the Maastrichtian is the final portion of the Cretaceous Period and its endpoint marks the advent of the Cretaceous–Paleogene extinction event. This major geological transition is famous for being the mass extinction that wiped out the dinosaurs.

== Biogeography ==
To date, Pucapristis fossils have been found only in the Maastrichtian deposits of central South America. The El Molino Formation of Bolivia produces Pucapristis tooth fossils in abundance. These Bolivian specimens have been recovered near the cities of Potosi and Sucre The Yacoraite Formation of Salta Province in northwestern Argentina is another locality from which Pucapristis remains can be excavated.

== See also ==
- Flora and fauna of the Maastrichtian stage
- List of prehistoric cartilaginous fish (Chondrichthyes)
