= Dolichochampsa =

Dolichochampsa Temporal range: Maastrichtian 71–66 Ma

Scientific classification
- Kingdom: Animalia
- Phylum: Chordata
- Class: Reptilia
- Clade: Pseudosuchia
- Clade: Crocodylomorpha
- Clade: Metasuchia
- Clade: Neosuchia
- Clade: Eusuchia
- Family: †Dolichochampsidae; De Gasparini & Buffetaut 1980
- Genus: †Dolichochampsa; Gasparini & Buffetaut 1980

Type species
- †Dolichochampsa minima Gasparini & Buffetaut 1980

Extinct genus of reptiles

Dolichochampsa is an extinct genus of eusuchian crocodylomorph. It is the type genus and only member of the family Dolichochampsidae. Fossils have been found in the Yacoraite Formation of Argentina and the El Molino Formation of Bolivia of Maastrichtian age. It had a distinctive slender snout. Because the material associated with the specimens is so fragmentary, its relationships with other eusuchians remain unknown. Jouve et al. (2020) assigned Dolichochampsa to Gavialoidea, making it the oldest known South American member of this clade.
