= Cajones Formation =

Geologic formation in central Bolivia

- Stratigraphic range: Turonian; ~94–85 Ma
- Type: Geological formation

Lithology
- Primary: Sandstone

Location
- Coordinates: 17.6°S 63.9°W
- Approximate paleocoordinates: 23.4°S 41.5°W
- Region: Santa Cruz Department
- Country: Bolivia
- Extent: Cordillera Oriental

Type section
- Named for: Cajones de Ichilo River
- Cajones Formation (Bolivia)

The Cajones Formation is a Turonian geologic formation of central Bolivia. The fluvial sandstones in Amboró National Park preserve fossils of Yacarerani boliviensis. The formation is correlated with the Adamantina Formation of the Paraná Basin in Brazil and the Bajo de la Carpa Formation of the Neuquén Basin in Patagonia, Argentina.

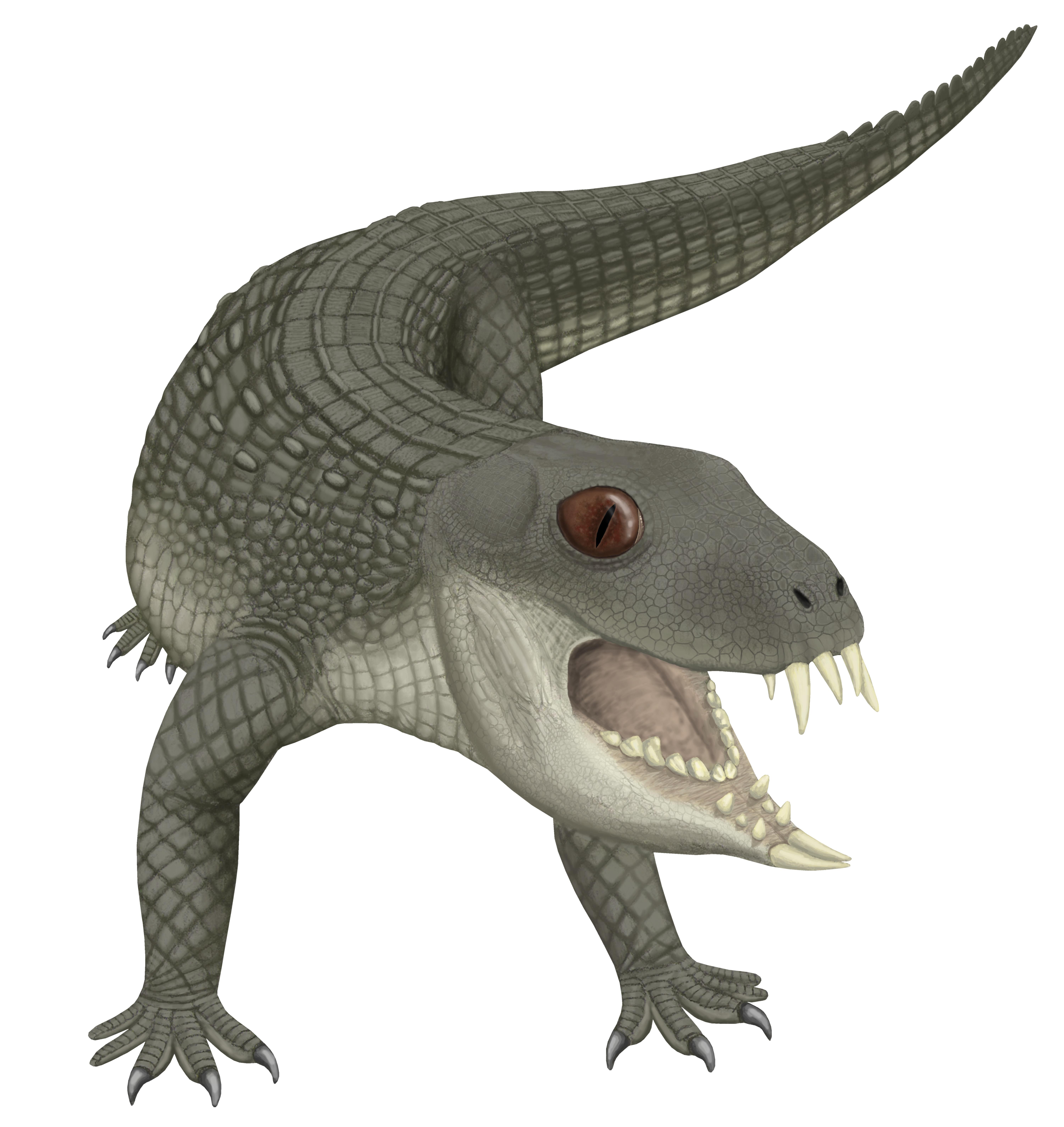
Interpretation of Yacarerani boliviensis

== See also ==
- List of fossiliferous stratigraphic units in Bolivia
- Chaunaca Formation
- Toro Toro Formation
