= Silver Sand =

Silver mining project in Bolivia

- Location within Bolivia
- Location: Potosí Department, Bolivia; 19°22′19″S 65°31′25″W
- Products: Silver
- Opened: TBA
- Company: Minera Alcira S.A.: New Pacific Metals (100%)

Silver Sand is an open-pit silver mine project in Potosí Department, central Bolivia.

== History and background ==
The ores of the Silver Sand area were mined in the early colonial era, before the onset of exploitation of Cerro Rico in 1545. Historic mining of silver in the area was limited to narrow veins.

Near Silver Sand lie two tin mines that were mined until the tin price crash of 1985.

== Description ==
The Silver Sand mining project lies in the Andes at altitudes of 3,800–4,000 m (12,500–13,100 ft) above sea level, around 33 km (21 mi) northeast (54 km (34 mi) by road) of the city of Potosí, Bolivia. It is an open-pit silver mine.

The project is fully owned by the Canadian company New Pacific Metals through its Bolivian subsidiary Minera Alcira S.A., which had as of 2023 consolidated the property and claims in the area. New Pacific Metals released a preliminary economic assessment in January 2023.

Silver Sand has a Base Case Pre-Tax Net Present Value (NPV) of $1.1bn and it is estimated to produce on average 12 million ounces of silver (doré) per year during its operation. The mine is expected to operate for 14 years.

The deposit is made of silver sulfosalts and sulfides of lead and zinc in fractures inside sandstone. The sandstone is part of the Cretaceous-aged La Puerta Formation. The mineral deposit classifies as epithermal of medium sulfidation and pertains to a wider mineral-rich region in Bolivia known as the Miocene Polymetallic Belt (Spanish: Faja metalogénica polimetálica miocena).

== See also ==
- Canadian mining in Latin America and the Caribbean
