= Bernardo Javier González Riga =

Argentine paleontologist

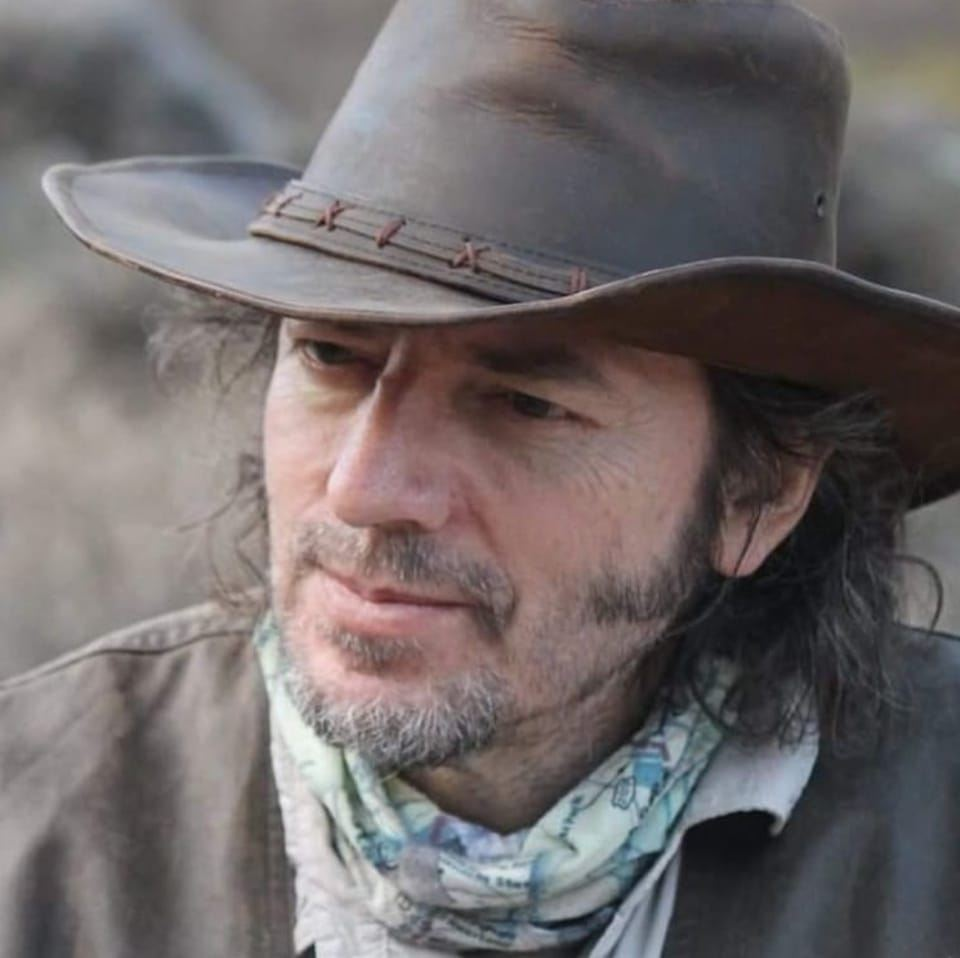
Photo of Bernardo

Bernardo J. González Riga is an Argentine palaeontologist and a professor of Earth Sciences, Paleontology and philosophy of science. He is internationally recognised for his research on sauropod dinosaur evolution. González Riga discovered in the Late Cretaceous strata of the Mendoza Province (Argentina) the huge sauropod dinosaur Notocolossus, one of the largest land animals ever found. He also described and co-described more than ten new dinosaur species.

== Scientific discoveries and their socio-cultural impact ==
Bernardo Javier González Riga is a researcher of the National Scientific and Technical Research Council (Principal Researcher). He also is a Research Associate of the Carnegie Museum of Natural History, Pittsburgh (United States). Between 2014 and 2017 he was the Principal of the career of Degree in Geology in the Facultad de Ciencias Exactas y Naturales of the National University of Cuyo, where he also works as a professor. He also runs as Director of Dinosaur Lab and Museum, which he himself founded at this university. His career represents continuous searching, discoveries and protection of natural ecosystems, biodiversity and fossil remains as evidence of evolution of the species. Some of his most relevant achievements are mentioned as follows:

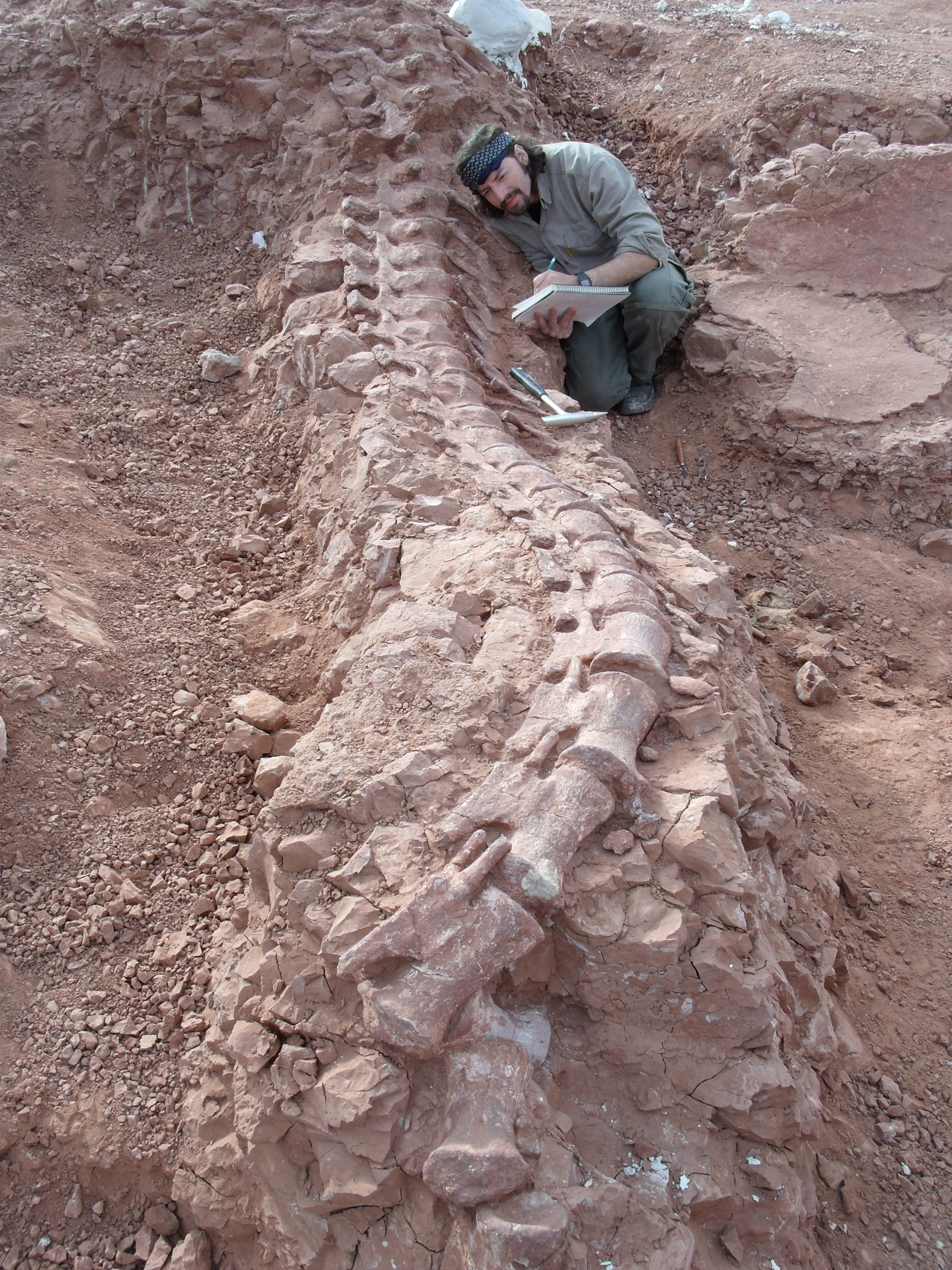
Discovery of exceptionally preserved articulated sauropod dinosaur of a new species by Dr. Bernardo Gonzalez Riga

He discovered one of the first sauropod dinosaur of Mendoza, and named it Mendozasaurus neguyelap, along with other new species of dinosaurs, turtles, fishes and flying reptiles. His studies highlight the analysis of past environments and its ecosystems. He have found dinosaurs in Argentina, Chile, Brazil, and the United States. He has excavated and named, together with other paleontologists, nine new species of dinosaurs: Mendozasaurus, Malarguesaurus, Quetecsaurus, Notocolossus, Rinconsaurus, Muyelensaurus, Ligabuesaurus, Lapampasaurus, Futalongnkosaurus, and two new species of extinct turtles: Linderochelys and Mendozachelys. He has also discovered the first site of fossil tracks of Mendoza, which is one of the largest of South America by the end of Cretaceous. The tracks were named Titanopodus and were made by giant herbivorous sauropod dinosaurs. They give us information about biological aspects related to locomotion and the gregarious habits of these huge vertebrates; this enable us to understand the environment of the past regarding climate and environment crises, and the strategies of survival of the last giant dinosaurs. Among his discoveries Notocolossus gonzalezparejasi stands off, considered as one of the three largest dinosaurs of the world. The discovery was published in the journal Scientific Reports of Nature and has had worldwide diffusion in the international media. It has received the TOP 100 distinction by editors of Nature, for being one of the 100 most important articles of this journal, among the 20,000 articles of greatest global impact. Members of this study also include Matthew Lamanna, Leonardo Ortiz David, Jorge Calvo and Juan P. Coria.

Bernardo J. González Riga and colleagues present an extensive study of the shoulder, hip, and limb bones of South American titanosaurs, and recognize the presence of a newly identified titanosaur lineage that they name Colossosauria (meaning "giant dinosaurs"). Colossosaurs include the heaviest terrestrial animals known to date (with maximum masses reaching as much as 50–70 tons), such as the Argentinean forms Argentinosaurus, Patagotitan, and Notocolossus, the latter boasting a powerfully built humerus 1.76 metres (5.8 ft) in length. The extreme body size of the largest titanosaurs poses considerable challenges for understanding the behavior and locomotion of these enormous animals.

Philosophical Activity

Bernardo J. González Riga has worked extensively in the fields of philosophy. He has served as a professor of the history and philosophy of science, as well as of epistemology and scientific method, collaborating in the training of young scientists.

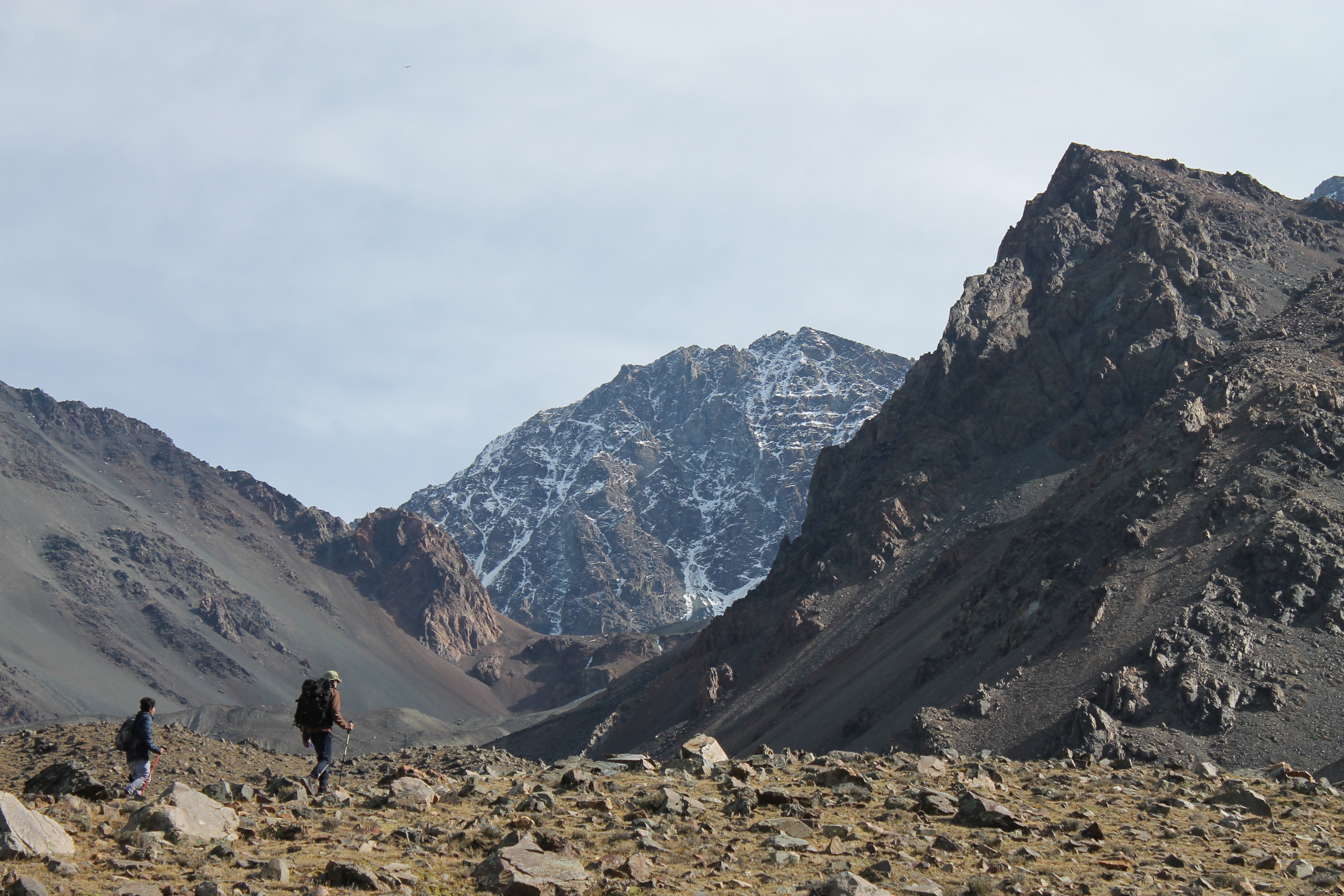
Cordon del Plata Natural Park, Mendoza Province, Argentina

== Creation of natural parks and biodiversity and fossils protection ==
Bernardo González Riga has been involved in numerous activities to protect natural environments, biodiversity and fossils. He was one of the coordinators of the team that proposed the creation of the Cordón del Plata Provincial Park in the Andes mountain range of Mendoza, Argentina. This initiative aimed to preserve the glaciers and rivers as vital resources, the fauna and flora, the landscape as well as the paleontological and archeological sites. He worked for eleven years in the creation and protection of the Cretaceous Park of Dinosaur Tracks. This natural park was discovered by González Riga himself in 2006. Since then, together with his colleague, the paleontologist Dr. Mercedes Prámparo, they managed and presented projects for its preservation as a natural park.

== Creation of laboratories and work teams ==
In 2012 Gonzalez Riga proposed the creation of the Laboratory of Dinosaurs in Mendoza. It is a research laboratory "open to society" with four complementary objectives: a) scientific research, b) teaching and training of human resources, c) paleontological heritage preservation and d) scientific disclosure. During the first five years, the Laboratory of Dinosaurs has been place for fossils exhibitions, workshops, conferences and activities in cooperation with other museums and science parks.

== Education in science: solidarity and common good ==
González Riga as a professor not only teaches science (paleontology, evolution, geology) but also emotional intelligence related to the scientific vocation. He promotes an ethical commitment to natural environments and the fossil remains preservation as heritage for science and culture development. His teaching methods include strategies of direct communication between student-teacher and a cooperative and solidarity work, the basis for achieving interdisciplinary studies. He developed educational including the participation of young people in research, scientific expeditions and congresses and fossil footprints preservation.

== Awards and distinctions ==
2016: Scientific distinction, Ameghiniana Scientific magazine. He received a distinction for his scientific article on the dinosaur Quetecsaurus. The distinction refers to the quality of the research and its impact on the scientific community.

2017: Nomination / International Award, 2017. Dr. B.J. Gonzalez Riga was nominated to compete in the international Frontiers of Knowledge award in 2016. He was nominated by the Rector of the National University of Cuyo and received the support of eight scientific institutions from Argentina, Chile, Brazil and the United States.

2018: Honorable mention / National Endowment for the Arts, Buenos Aires. It honors the Dinosaur Museum and Laboratory Team for its track record in researching and protecting cultural heritage.

2019: Distinction from the Honorable Chamber of Deputies of Mendoza (Argentina) to the Dinosaur Laboratory and Museum Team, to each of its members, and to its director and founder, Dr. Bernardo Gonzalez Riga for "their valuable contribution in research scientific, education and protection of fossil remains as cultural assets of the province of Mendoza and the Argentine Nation".

2019: Distinction of the Honorable Chamber of Senators of Mendoza (Argentina) "for a 25-year career in the service of scientific research, social extension and protection of fossil remains as cultural assets of the province of Mendoza and the Argentine Nation". The act of recognition was held in the auditorium of the Faculty of Exact and Natural Sciences of the National University of Cuyo and was attended by authorities from CONICET, the National University of Cuyo and legislators.

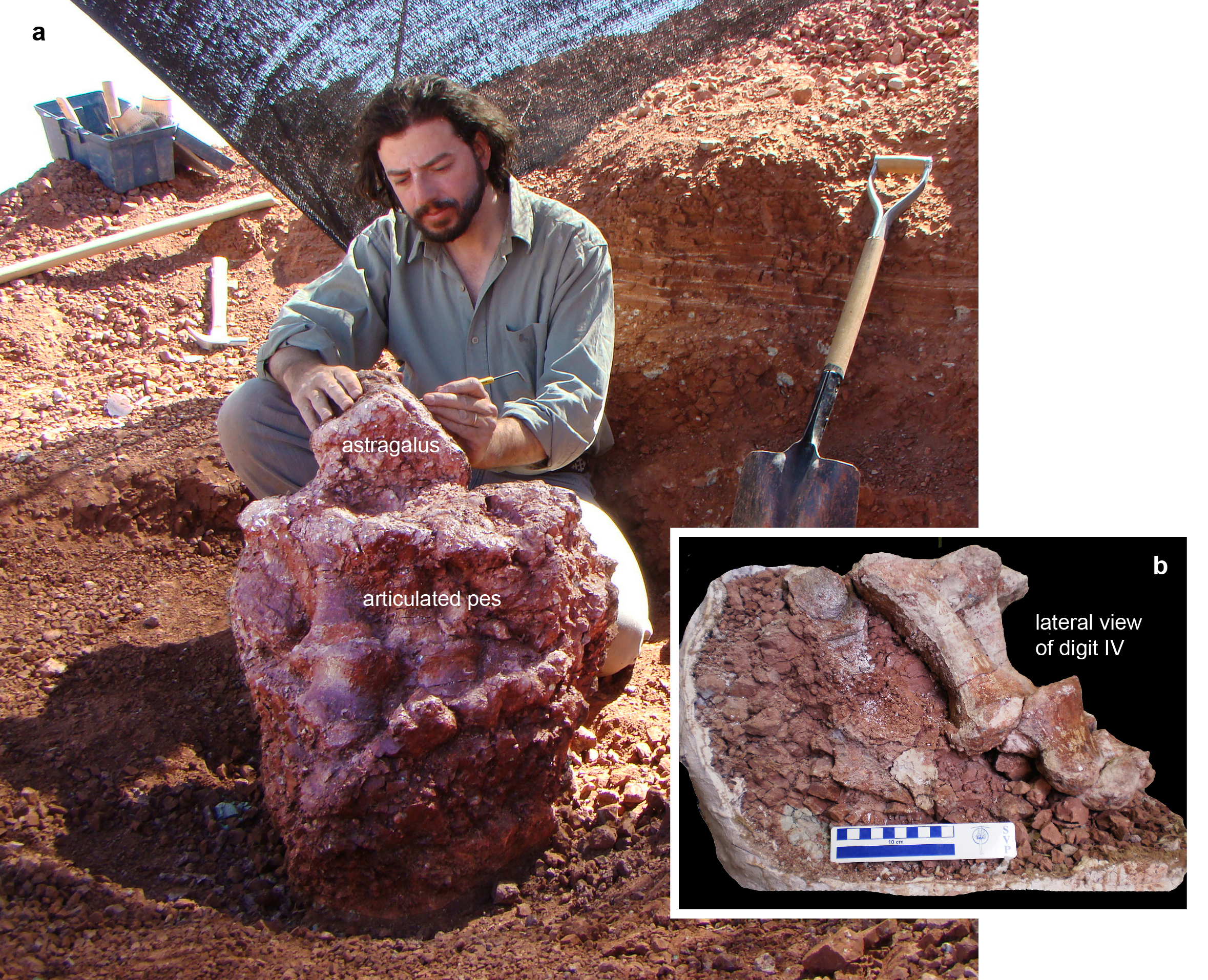
Dr. Bernardo J. Gonzalez Riga excavating a complete foot of giant Notocolossus dinosaur in Argentina
