= Cal Orck'o =

Fossil bed in Bolivia

Coordinates: 19.0028°S 65.2372°W

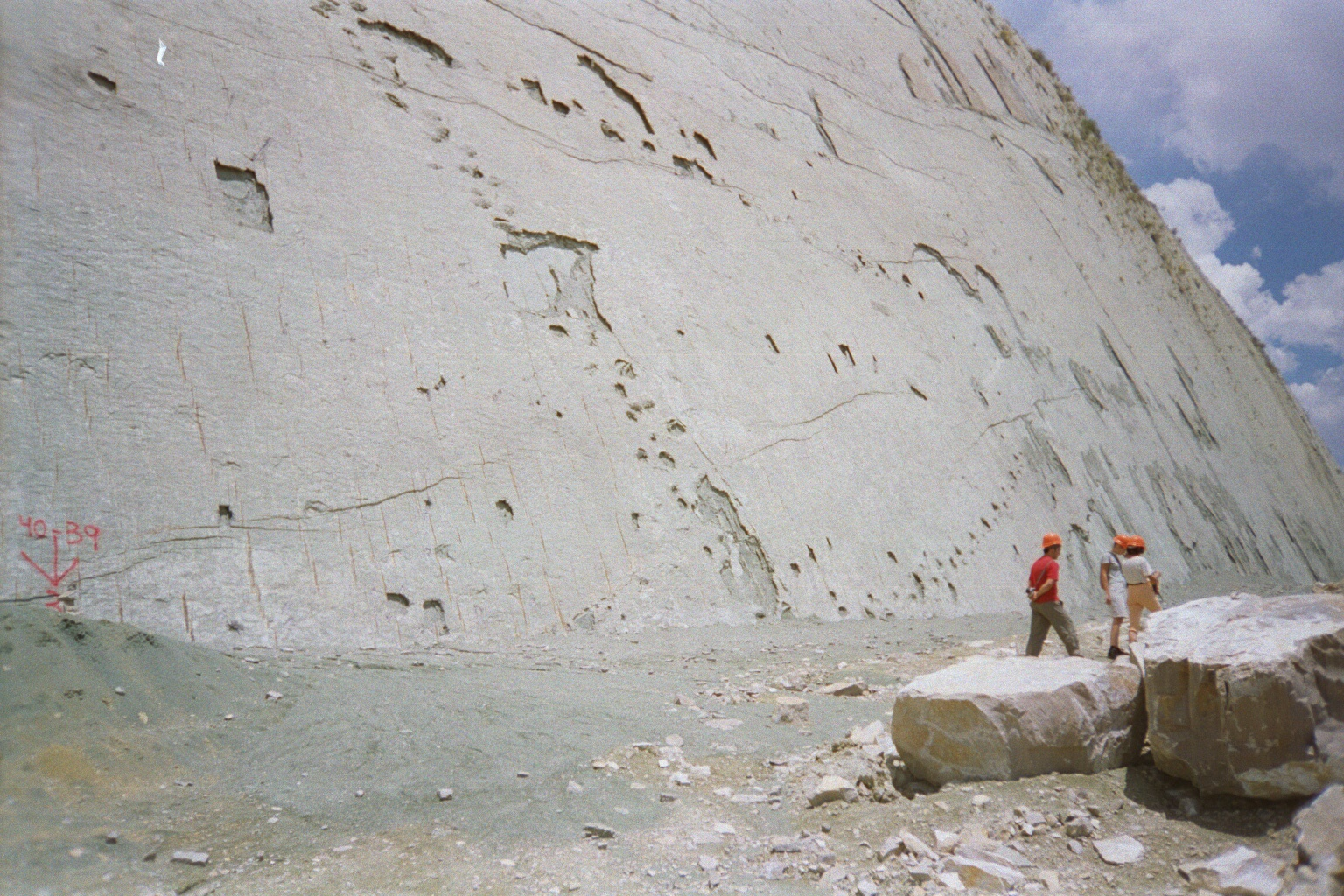
Cal Orck'o fossil tracks 1

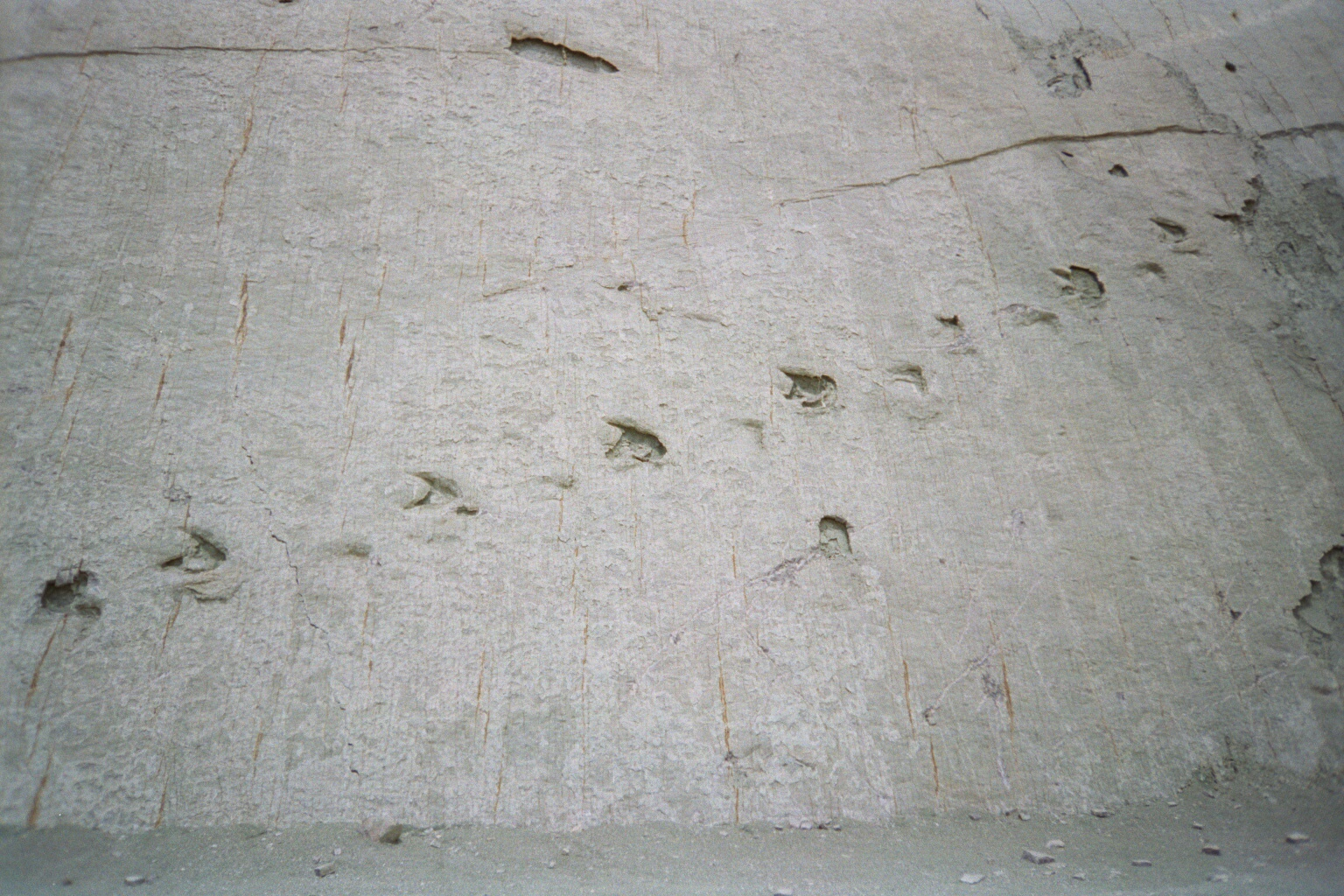
Cal Orck'o fossil tracks 2

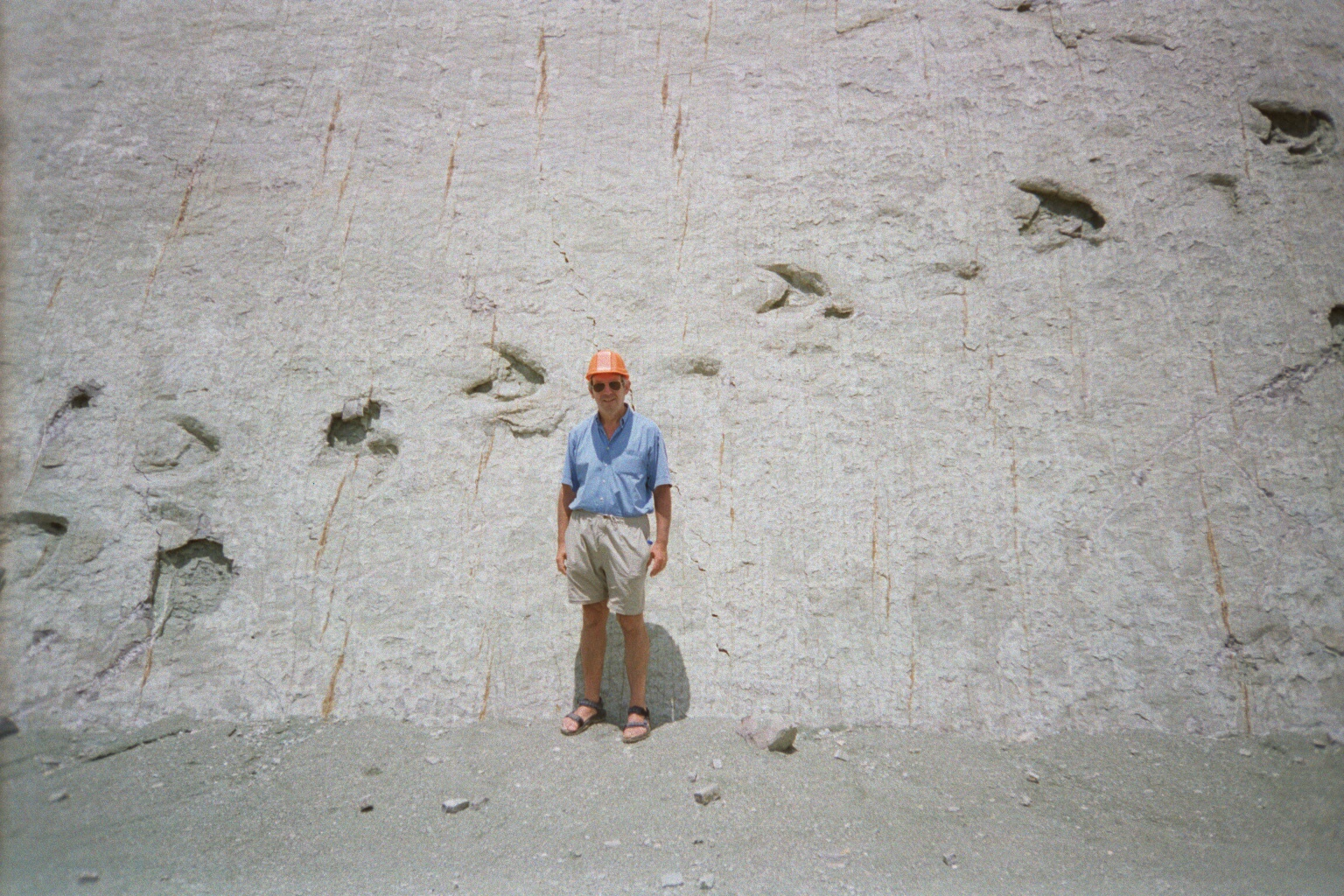
Cal Orck'o fossil tracks 3

Cal Orck’o is a fossil bed in Bolivia. It is located in a quarry approximately 4.4 km northwest of Sucre (Chuquisaca Department, Bolivia) in the Altiplano/Cordillera Oriental, in the El Molino Formation (Middle Maastrichtian).

The bed is composed of oolitic fossiliferous limestone, associated with large, freshwater stromatolites and nine levels of dinosaur tracks (trace fossils) in the El Molino Formation document an open lacustrine environment.

The main track-bearing level is almost vertical with a surface area of ~ 65,000 m^{2}. The high-resolution mapping of the site from 1998 to 2015 revealed a total of 12,092 individual dinosaur tracks in 465 trackways. Nine different morphotypes of dinosaur tracks have been documented. Amongst them are several trackways of theropods, ornithopods, ankylosaurs and sauropods, with the latter group accounting for 26% of the trackways.
