= Chaunaca Formation =

Geologic formation in Bolivia

- Stratigraphic range: Campanian
- Type: Geological formation
- Unit of: Upper Puca Group
- Overlies: Aroifilla Formation

Lithology
- Primary: Sandstone

Location
- Coordinates: 19.1°S 65.5°W
- Approximate paleocoordinates: 22.4°S 47.1°W
- Region: Chuquisaca Department
- Country: Bolivia
- Extent: Subandean Belt

Type section
- Named for: Chaunaca
- Chaunaca Formation (Bolivia)

The Chaunaca Formation is a Campanian geologic formation of Bolivia. Fossil sauropod tracks have been reported from the formation.

== See also ==
- List of dinosaur-bearing rock formations
  - List of stratigraphic units with sauropodomorph tracks
    - Sauropod tracks
