= List of stratigraphic units with dinosaur tracks =

== Indeterminate or unspecified dinosaur tracks ==
Name	Age	Location	Description
Arcabuco Formation	Tithonian to Berriasian	Chíquiza, Boyacá, Colombia	Several tracks of different dinosaur groups
Camadas de Alcobaça	Kimmeridgian	Portugal	Description
Djadochta Formation	Middle Campanian	China; Mongolia	has many alternate spellings
El Jume Formation		Argentina	Description
Jinjiang Formation		China	Description
Przysucha Formation		Poland	Description
Quwu Formation		China	Description
Wangi Formation		China	Description
Wangshi Group		China	Description
Yuanpu Formation		China	Description

== See also ==
List of dinosaur-bearing rock formations
