= Lists of dinosaur-bearing stratigraphic units =

This list of dinosaur-bearing rock formations is a list of geologic formations in which dinosaur fossils have been documented.

- List of stratigraphic units with dinosaur body fossils
- List of stratigraphic units with dinosaur trace fossils
  - List of stratigraphic units with dinosaur tracks
    - List of stratigraphic units with ornithischian tracks
    - List of stratigraphic units with sauropodomorph tracks
    - List of stratigraphic units with theropod tracks

== See also ==
- Lists of fossiliferous stratigraphic units
- List of fossil sites
- Mesozoic
