= Vulcano (disambiguation) =

Vulcano is the southernmost of the eight Aeolian Islands in the Mediterranean Sea.

Vulcano may also refer to:

== Arts, entertainment, media ==
- Vulcano (1950 film), an Italian drama
- Vulcano (band), a Brazilian metal band
- "Vulcano" (song), by Francesca Michielin, 2017
- "Vulcano", a song by Italian singer Mina from 20 successi di Mina, 1964

== People and characters ==
=== Persons ===
- Sal Vulcano (born 1976), American comedian
- Drag Vulcano, Spanish drag queen

=== Fictional characters ===
- Vulcano Rosso, a character from the Street Fighter EX series of videogames

== Ships ==
- SMS Vulcano, a 19th-century Austrian paddle steamer
- Italian ship Vulcano, a 21st-century Italian replenishment oiler, a Vulcano-class logistics ship
- Vulcano-class logistic support ship, a 21st-century European logistics ship class
- SS Bastø (1934), a ferry also known as Vulcano

== Other uses ==
- An obsolete spelling of volcano
- 4464 Vulcano, the asteroid Vulcano, the 4464th asteroid registered, a main-belt asteroid

== See also ==
- Vulcano, figlio di Giove, a 1962 Italian fantasy adventure film
- Vulcanoa
- Vulkano
- Volcano (disambiguation)
- Vulkan (disambiguation)
- Vulcan (disambiguation)
- Volkan (disambiguation)
- Volcan (disambiguation)
