= Volcanic (disambiguation) =

Volcanic is an adjective used for things and concepts related to volcanos.

It may also refer to:

== Places and geography ==
- Volcanic City, British Columbia
- Volcanic Hills (California)
- Volcanic Hills (Nevada)
- Volcanic Legacy Scenic Byway, an American National Scenic Byway

== People ==
- Volcanic Brown, one of the many nicknames of Robert Allan Brown (c. 1849–1931), a Canadian mining prospector and speculator

== Other uses ==
- Volcanic Repeating Arms, a 19th-century firearms company
- Volcanic Sorrel (Oxalis spiralis)

== See also ==
- Volcan (disambiguation)
- Volcano (disambiguation)
- Vulcan (disambiguation)
- Vulkan (disambiguation)
