= Volcano (disambiguation) =

A volcano is a geological landform usually generated by the eruption through a vent in a planet's surface of magma.

Volcano may also refer to:

== Geographical ==
=== Islands ===
- Taal Volcano, also known as Volcano Island, in the Philippines
- Volcano Islands south of Japan, part of Bonin Islands
- Vulcano an island near Sicily, Italy

=== Towns ===
- Bath, California or Volcano
- Volcano, California
- Volcano, Hawaii
- Volcano, West Virginia

=== Volcanoes ===
- The Volcano (British Columbia), a cinder cone in British Columbia, Canada
- Volcano Mountain, a volcano in Yukon, Canada
- Volcano Vent, a volcano in British Columbia

== Film and television ==
- Volcano! (1926 film), an American silent film starring Bebe Daniels
- Volcano (1942 film), a short film based upon the DC Comics Superman
- Volcano (1950 film), an Italian-language film
- Krakatoa, East of Java or Volcano, a 1969 American film
- Volcano: An Inquiry into the Life and Death of Malcolm Lowry, a 1976 documentary film
- Volcano (1997 film), an action disaster film starring Tommy Lee Jones
- Volcano (2009 film), a German film featuring Pia Mechler
- Volcano (2011 film), an Icelandic film
- "Volcano" (North Square), a 2000 TV episode
- "Volcano" (South Park), a 1997 TV episode
- "Volcano", eighth episode of the 1966 Doctor Who serial The Daleks' Master Plan

== Music ==
=== Bands and labels ===
- Volcano Entertainment, a record label
- Volcano (supergroup), a punk/country supergroup from the United States
- Volcano! (band), an experimental band from Chicago, Illinois, United States

=== Albums ===
- Volcano (Edie Brickell album) or its title song, 2003
- Volcano (Jimmy Buffett album) or its title song, 1979
- Volcano (Jungle album), 2023
- Volcano (Gatsbys American Dream album), 2005
- Volcano (Satyricon album), 2002
- Volcano (Temples album), 2017
- Volcano (Volcano album) or its title song, 2004

=== Songs ===
- "Volcano" (Jimmy Buffett song), 1979
- "Volcano", by the Band from Cahoots, 1971
- "Volcano", by Beck from Modern Guilt, 2008
- "Volcano", by Bell X1 from Neither Am I, 200
- "Volcano", by Brooke Candy, 2017
- "Volcano", by Damien Rice from O, 2002
- "Volcano", by Dethklok from Dethalbum II, 2009
- "Volcano", by Maisie Peters from You Signed Up For This, 2021
- "Volcano", by the Presidents of the United States of America from II, 1996
- "Volcano", by Red Plastic Bag, 2006
- "Volcano", by Swans from Soundtracks for the Blind, 1996
- "Volcano", by The Vamps from Wake Up, 2015
- "Volcano", by Voivod from Infini, 2009

== Sports ==
- Salem-Keizer Volcanoes, a minor league baseball team in Keizer, Oregon
- Vancouver Volcanoes, an International Basketball League franchise in Vancouver
- Lesley Vainikolo or Volcano (born 1979), rugby player

== Other uses ==
- Volcano (brand), a clothing brand
- Volcano: The Blast Coaster, a roller coaster at Kings Dominion
- Volcano, a South Devon Railway Tornado class steam locomotives
- Volcano! (gamebook), a book in the original Choose Your Own Adventure series
- Volcano H-2, a Yemeni ballistic missile
- The M136 Volcano Vehicle-Launched Scatterable Mine System, an automated mine delivery system developed by the United States Army in the 1980s.

== See also ==
- Al-Burkan, Libyan exile dissident group in the 1980s
- Ixcanul, a 2015 Guatemalan film
- The Volcano (disambiguation)
- Volcan (disambiguation)
- Volcanic (disambiguation)
- Vulcan (disambiguation)
- Vulkan (disambiguation)
- Vulcano (disambiguation)
- Vulkano
- Vulcanoa
