= VCO =

VCO may refer to:

== Military ==
- Veterinary Corps Officer, see Veterinary corps (disambiguation)
- Viceroy's commissioned officer, British Indian Army role (1885–1947)

== Technology ==
- Voltage-controlled oscillator, an electronic device
- Voice Carry Over, a telecommunications relay service
- Akatsuki (spacecraft), or the Venus Climate Orbiter
- Virtual Central Office, in Open Platform for NFV network-function virtualization software

== Other uses ==
- Vegan Camp Out, an annual UK camping festival
- Voyage Century Online, a nautically themed, free-to-play, massively multiplayer online role-playing game
- Vice Commodore, an elected yacht club committee member
- VCO SA, the joint-stock company, and a distributor of Volcano clothing brand
