= The Volcano =

The Volcano may refer to:

- Any generic volcano
- A monotone chant made popular by fans of the Iceland national football team.
- Volcano, California, a community in northern California
- The Volcano (British Columbia), a cinder cone in northwestern British Columbia, Canada
- The Volcano (1919), a silent film directed by George Irving
- Al-Burkan (The Volcano), a Libyan exile dissident group in the 1980s
- The Volcano (nightclub), a former nightclub in Glasgow, Scotland.

== See also ==
- Volcano (disambiguation)
