= Volcan =

Volcan or Volcán may refer to:

== Places ==
- Volcán, Panama, town in Panama
- Volcán (Jujuy), town in Argentina

== Other uses ==
- Volcan (mining company), Peruvian mining company
- Volcán River, Chile
- Volcán Lake, Bolivia
- Volcán (album), a 1978 album by José José

== People with the surname ==
- Erin Volcán (born 1984), Venezuelan swimmer
- Mickey Volcan (born 1962), Canadian ice hockey player
- Mike Volcan (1932–2013), Canadian football player
- Ramón Volcán (born 1956), Venezuelan swimmer

== See also ==
- Vulcan (disambiguation)
- Vulkan (disambiguation)
- Volcano (disambiguation)
- Volcanic (disambiguation)
