= Florida Province =

- Province
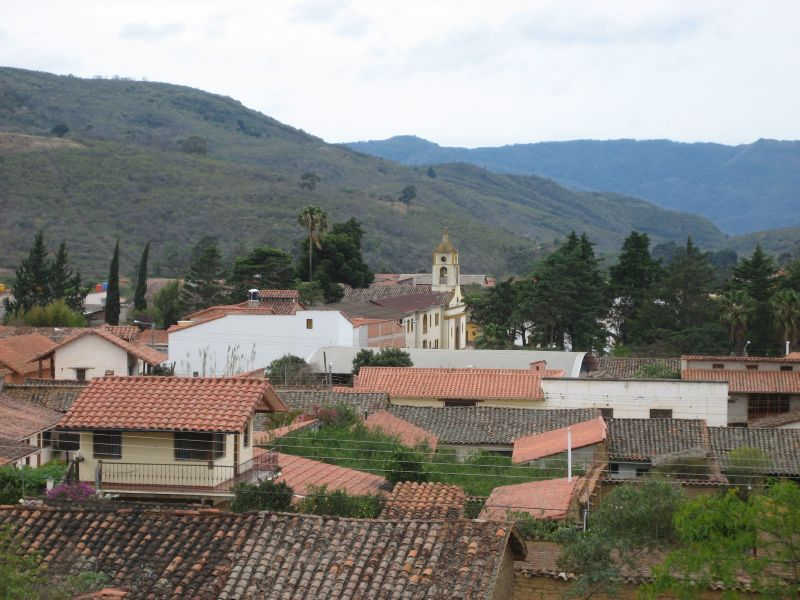
- Panorama of Samaipata

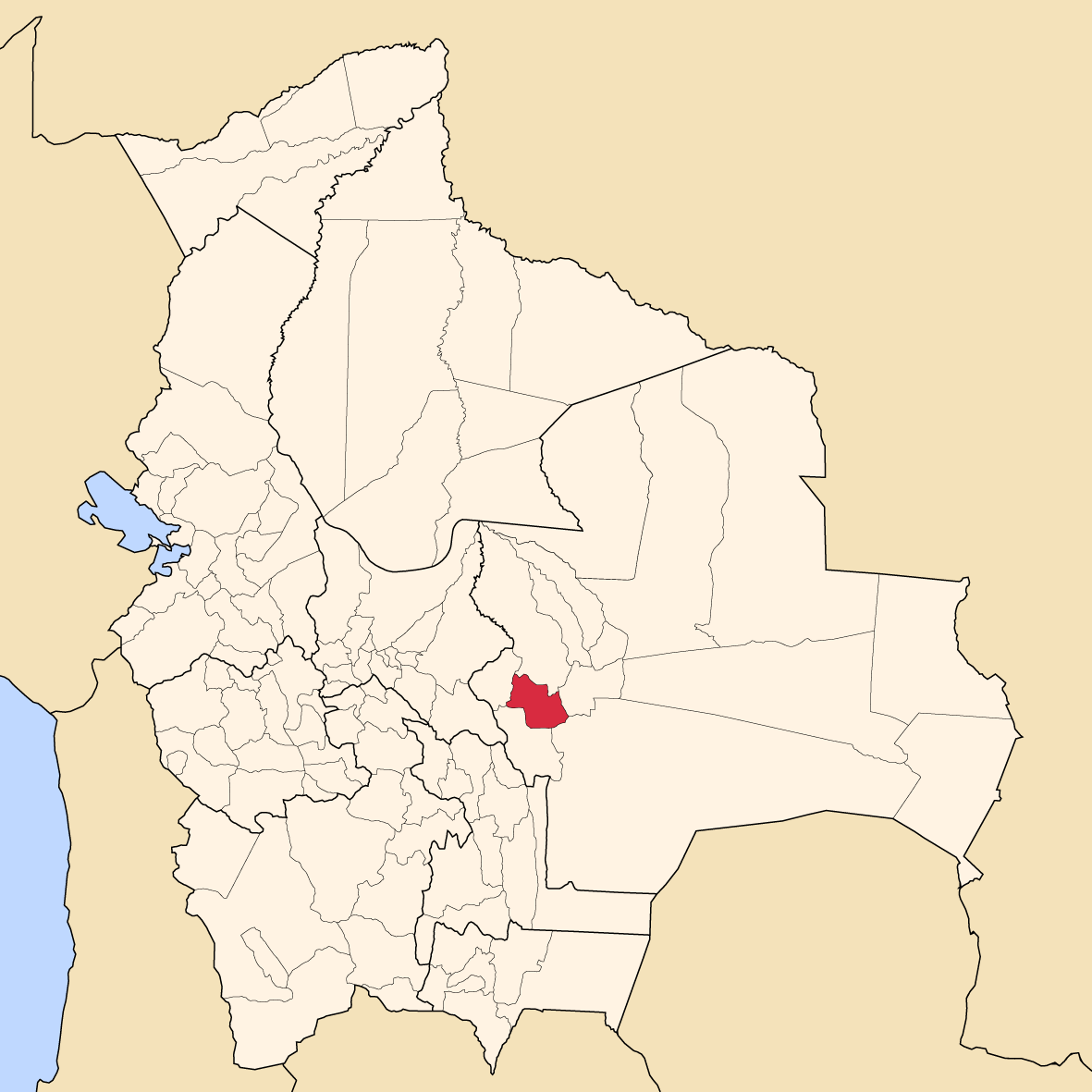
- Location of Ñuflo de Chávez Province within Bolivia

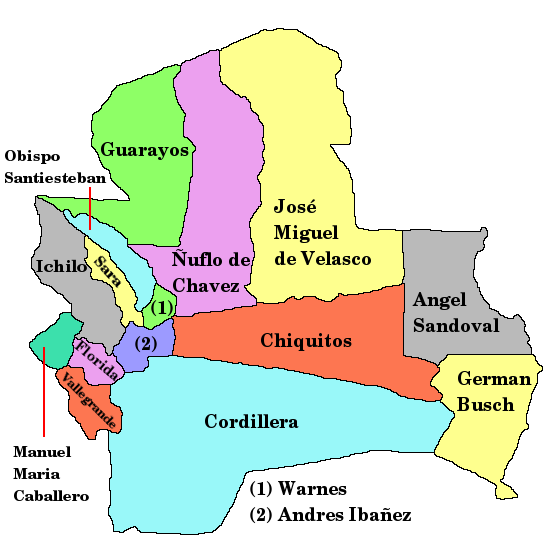
- Provinces of the Santa Cruz Department
- Coordinates: 18°10′S 63°50′W
- Country: Bolivia
- Department: Santa Cruz Department
- Capital: Samaipata

Government
  - Sub governor: Hebert Toledo (Samaipata)

Area
  - Total: 1,595 sq mi (4,132 km^{2})
- Elevation: 5,480 ft (1,670 m)

Population (2024)
  - Total: 37,291
  - Density: 23.37/sq mi (9.025/km^{2})
- Time zone: UTC-4 (BOT)
- Area code: BO.SC.FL

Florida is a Province in the Santa Cruz Department, Bolivia. Its capital is Samaipata. The province was created by law on December 15, 1924.

== Division ==
The province is divided into four municipalities which are further subdivided into cantons.

Section	Municipality	Inhabitants (2001)	Seat	Inhabitants (2001)
1st	Samaipata Municipality	9,739	Samaipata	2,926
2nd	Pampa Grande Municipality	7,933	Pampa Grande	766
3rd	Mairana Municipality	7,747	Mairana	3,884
4th	Quirusillas Municipality	2,028	Quirusillas	686

== Places of interest ==
- The archaeological site of Fort Samaipata (El Fuerte de Samaipata) which was declared a UNESCO World Heritage Site in 1998 and Amboró National Park are the principal tourist attractions of the province.
- Laguna Volcán
- Las Cuevas. There are several pools and beaches where the locals swim and disport themselves.
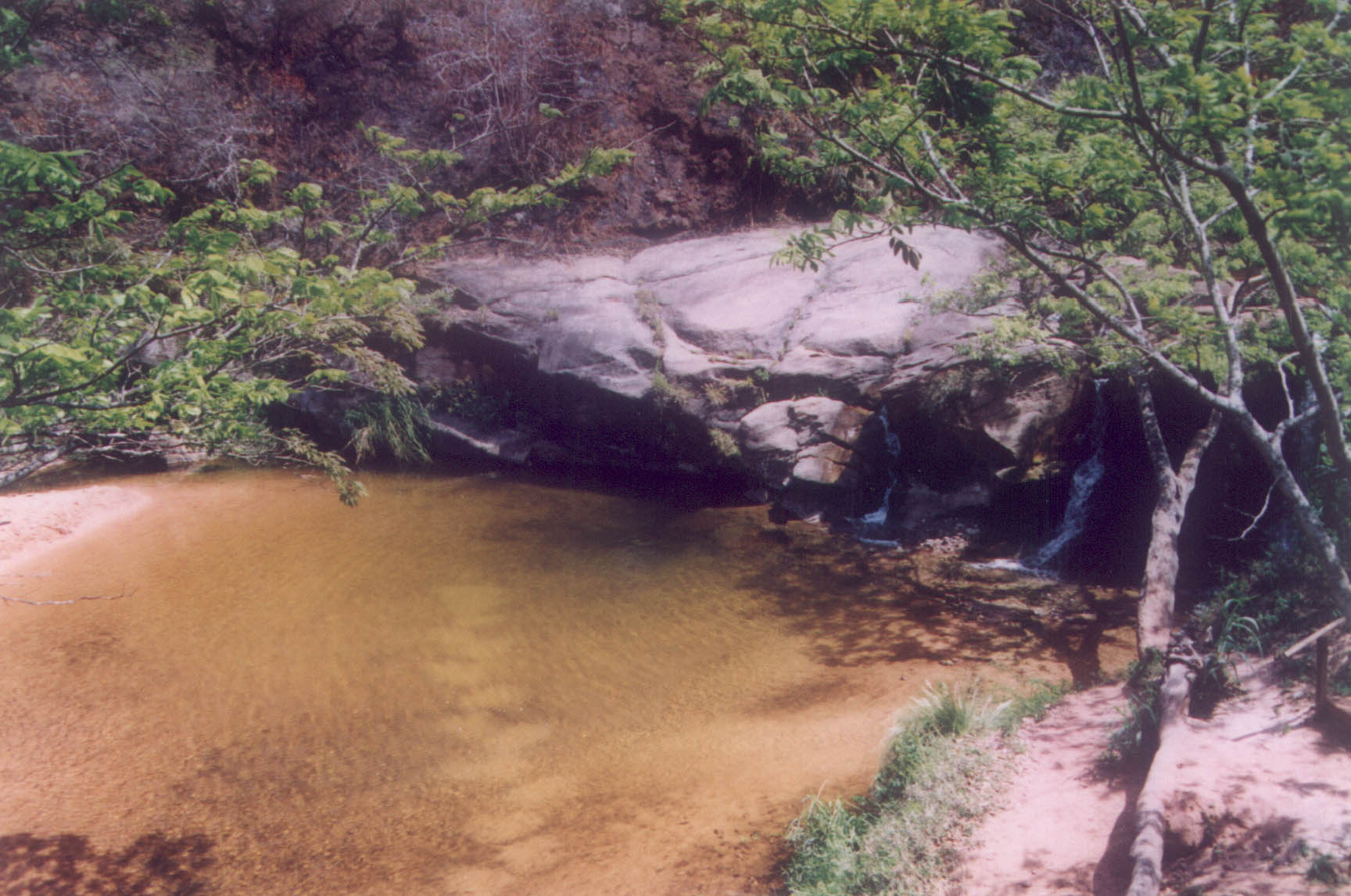
Las Cuevas. Rock pools and waterfall where the locals swim.

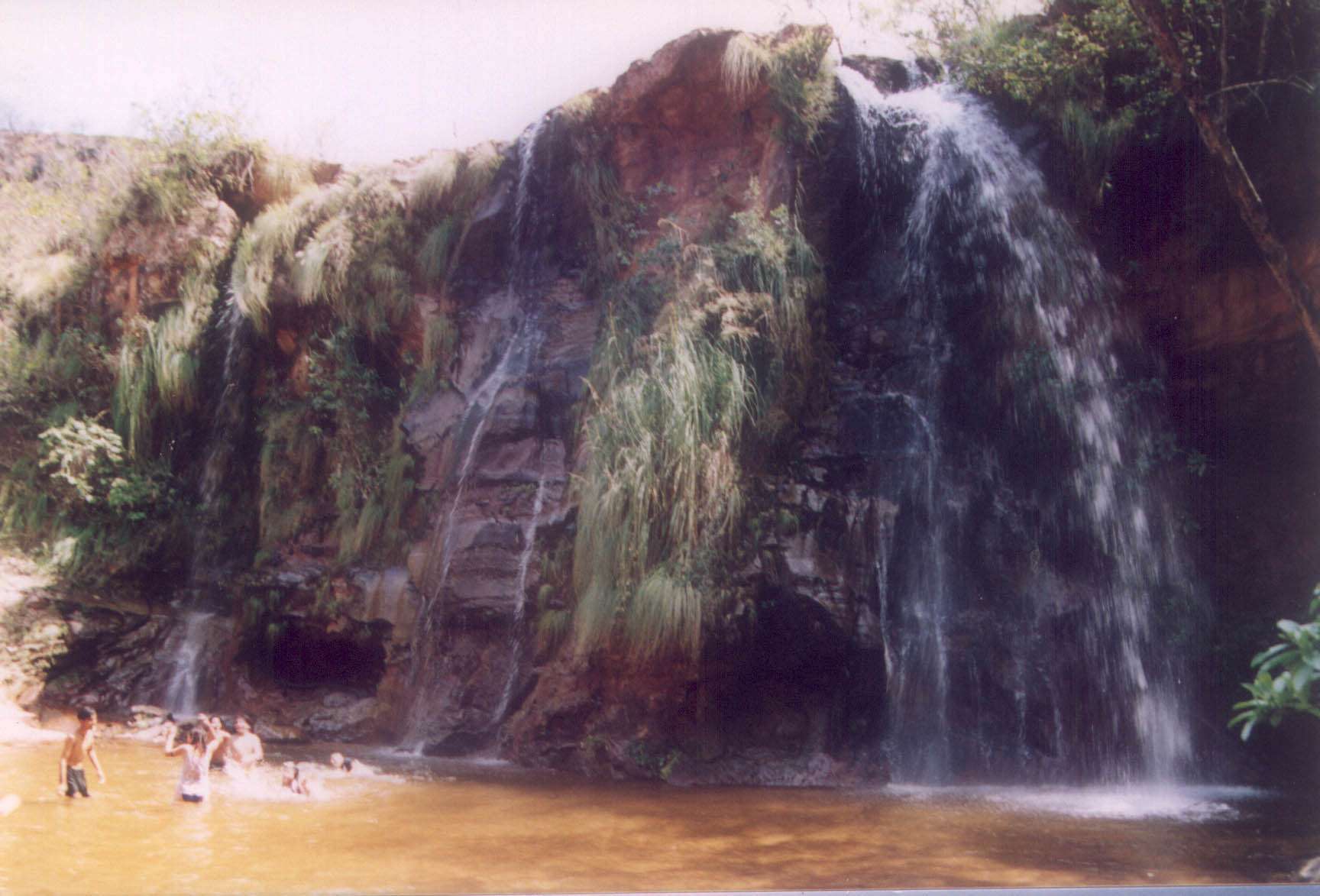
Las Cuevas

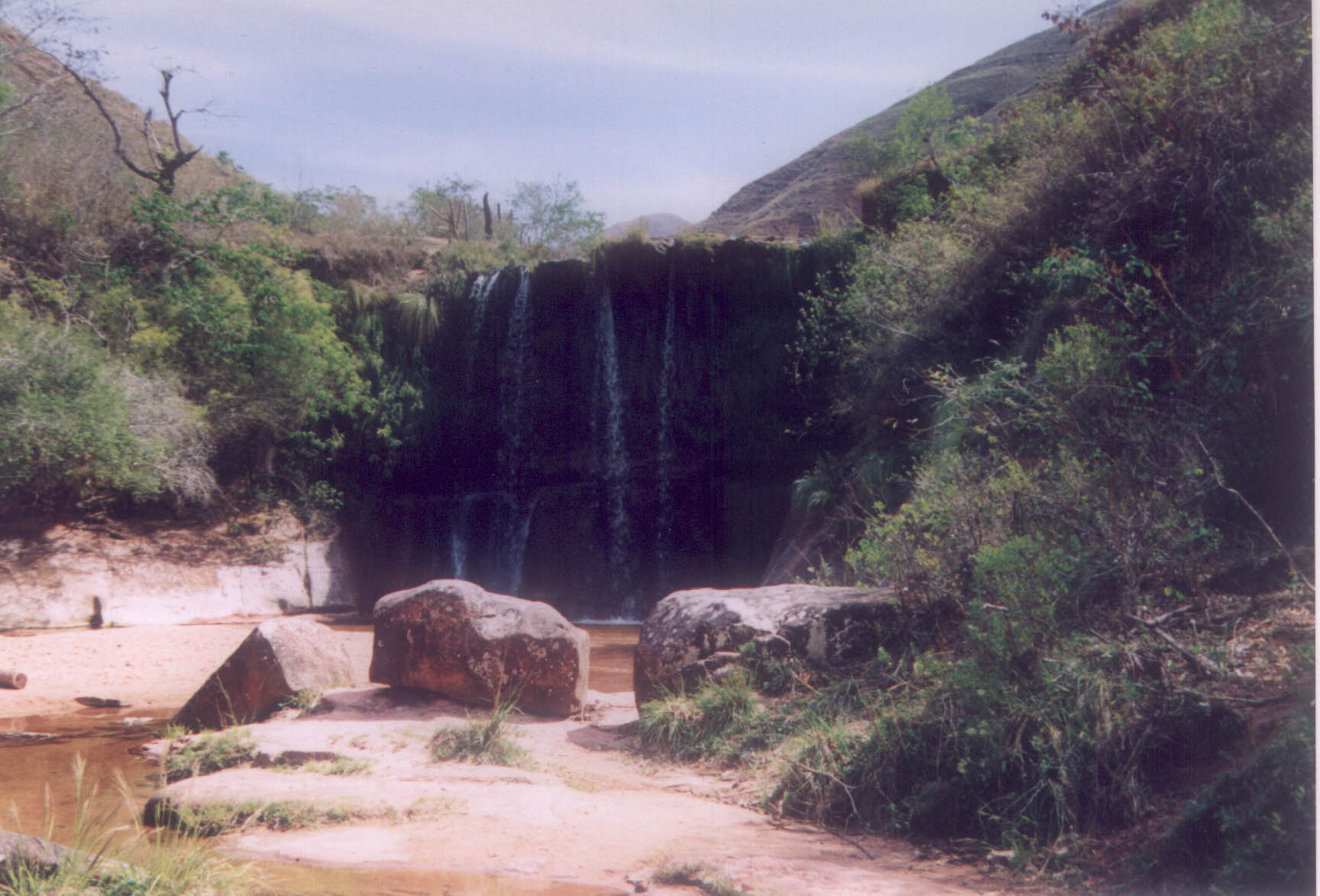
Las Cuevas
