= Funky Flashman =

Fictional character in the DC Universe

Publication information
- Publisher: DC Comics
- First appearance: Mister Miracle #6 (January–February 1972)
- Created by: Jack Kirby (writer-artist)

In-story information
- Full name: N/A
- Species: Human
- Team affiliations: Secret Society of Super Villains

Funky Flashman is a fictional character, an entrepreneur in the DC Universe. Created by Jack Kirby, the character first appeared in the pages of Mister Miracle during the early 1970s. He is popularly considered a satirical caricature of Stan Lee, Kirby's former artistic collaborator at Marvel Comics with whom he had a falling-out. Flashman's attempts to rip off Mister Miracle reflect Kirby's view that Lee exploited his work at Marvel in the 1960s.

== Fictional character biography ==
Nothing is known about Funky's past except that he and his sidekick Houseroy (popularly considered to be a caricature of Roy Thomas) were business associates of a Colonel Mockingbird. After Mockingbird's death, Funky and Houseroy lived on monthly allowances that were automatically doled out. Noticing that the monthly allowances were getting smaller, Funky decided that he needed a new source of income.

In Funky Flashman's first appearance, he unsuccessfully attempts to cash in on the talents of Mister Miracle. Donning a wig and a beard, he meets with Miracle to interview for the position of his tour manager. Miracle accepts, despite the fact that Big Barda and Oberon object to Flashman's demeanor and tactics. The next day, Miracle performs several of his escape acts, much to Flashman's delight. Flashman asks for Miracle's secret, and Miracle reveals the Mother Box he keeps on his shoulder. From around the corner, the two men see Big Barda and the Female Fury Lashina engaged in a struggle. Miracle jumps in to help Barda but Lashina vanishes with the power of her phasing circuits. The two realize the Female Furies have been tracking their whereabouts through the Mother Box signal.

During the skirmish, Flashman decides to leave with the Mother Box in hand, but it summons all of the Female Furies to him. In response, he jumps out the window as his house explodes.

Funky Flashman was later seen as a member of Darkseid's Secret Society of Super Villains.

Funky is later featured in many issues of Mister Miracle's own series. Tying into events in Justice League International, Funky forces Mister Miracle into an interstellar promotional campaign for the cleaning product Miracle Mister. This tour ends up involving Manga Khan and the forces of Apokolips, both dangerous threats. Mister Miracle is forced to leave behind a robotic double, so as to go on Funky's trip. The robot is destroyed in Rockefeller Center, leading many to believe Miracle died.

Flashman appears for two pages in Swamp Thing #76, "L'adoration De La terre" (September 1988), then part of Spontaneous Generation Bound Compilation #8, pp. 134 & 135, and later as the leader of the Secret Society of Super Villains in their series.

He appeared in 2005's Son of Vulcan mini-series as the proprietor of a pawn shop that dealt in superhero and villain artifacts and equipment, and as a criminal go-between and procurer for White Martian A'monn A'mokk.

He briefly appears in 2007's Doctor 13 limited series Architecture & Morality. He is seen operating Flashman Pre-Owned Auto, selling various superhero-themed vehicles.

He appears in Adventure Comics, where he is apprehended by Red Robin and Superboy while driving through the streets of Paris with a stolen Mother Box.

== Powers and abilities ==
Funky Flashman has no superhuman powers, but he is very charismatic, charming and a skilled businessman.

== In other media ==
Funky Flashman appears as a character summon in Scribblenauts Unmasked: A DC Comics Adventure.
