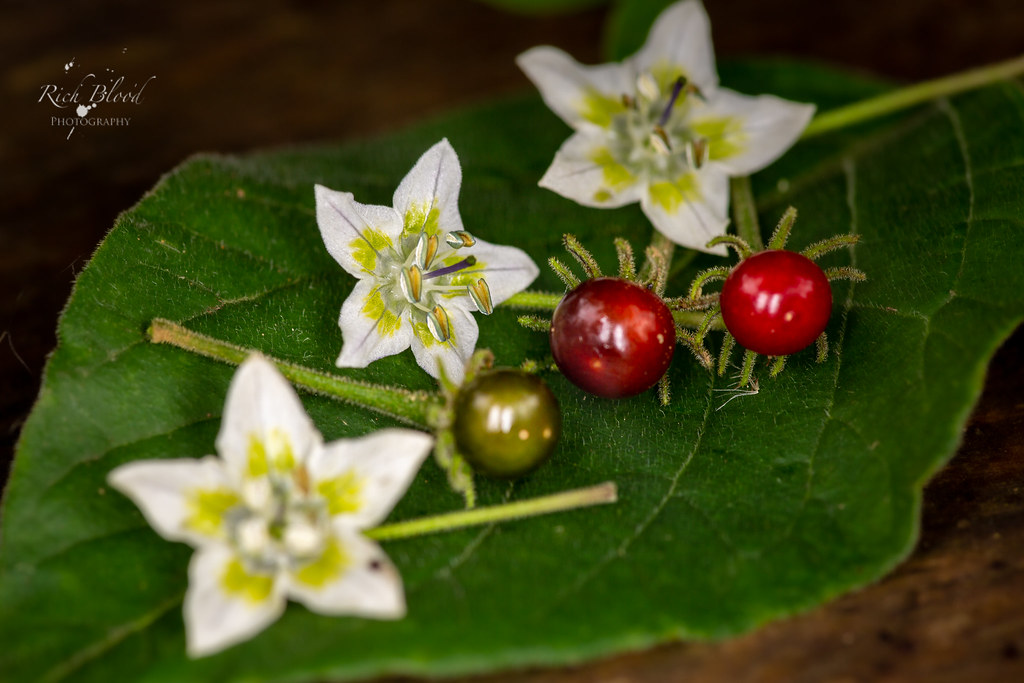
- Capsicum eshbaughii fruit flower and leaf morphology displayed on table

Conservation status
- Endangered (IUCN 3.1)

Scientific classification
- Kingdom: Plantae
- Clade: Tracheophytes
- Clade: Angiosperms
- Clade: Eudicots
- Clade: Asterids
- Order: Solanales
- Family: Solanaceae
- Genus: Capsicum
- Species: C. eshbaughii

Binomial name
- Capsicum eshbaughii Barboza, 2011

= Capsicum eshbaughii =

Species of flowering plant

Capsicum eshbaughii is a wild species of chili pepper (genus Capsicum, family Solanaceae) endemic to central Bolivia. It was first described by Gloria E. Barboza in 2011 and named in honor of the American botanist William H. Eshbaugh for his pioneering work on wild Capsicum taxonomy. The species is distinguished by its dense indumentum consisting of various types of glandular trichomes, 10 calyx appendages, bright-red fruits, and a stellate corolla that is white with purple margins and greenish-yellow spots in the throat.

== Taxonomy and discovery ==
Capsicum eshbaughii was first collected by American botanist William H. Eshbaugh in the 1980s near Mairana, Bolivia. The species remained poorly known for decades and was thought to be possibly extinct in the wild. It was formally described in 2011 by Gloria E. Barboza based on herbarium material and earlier field collections, and named in honor of Eshbaugh for his contributions to wild Capsicum taxonomy.

In December 2019, living populations were documented near Samaipata, Bolivia, by independent field researcher Rich Blood. The finding was later verified by Claudio Dal Zovo and subsequently confirmed through collections and molecular studies conducted by South American botanists including Gloria Barboza. These studies clarified the species’ placement within Capsicum section Andinum and confirmed its conservation significance.

== Description ==
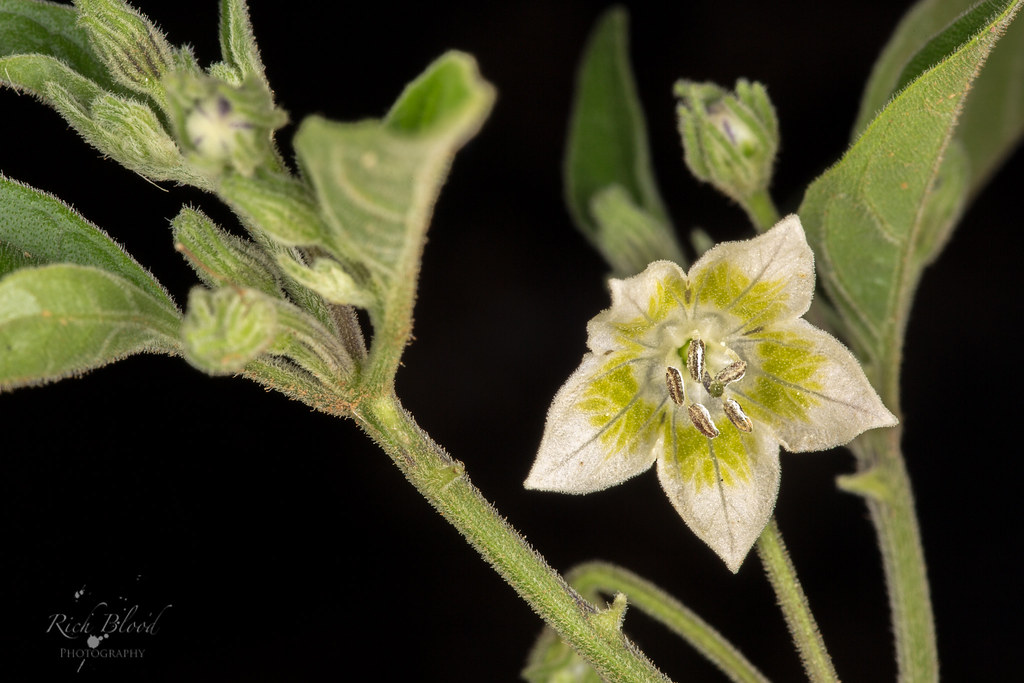
Flower morphology

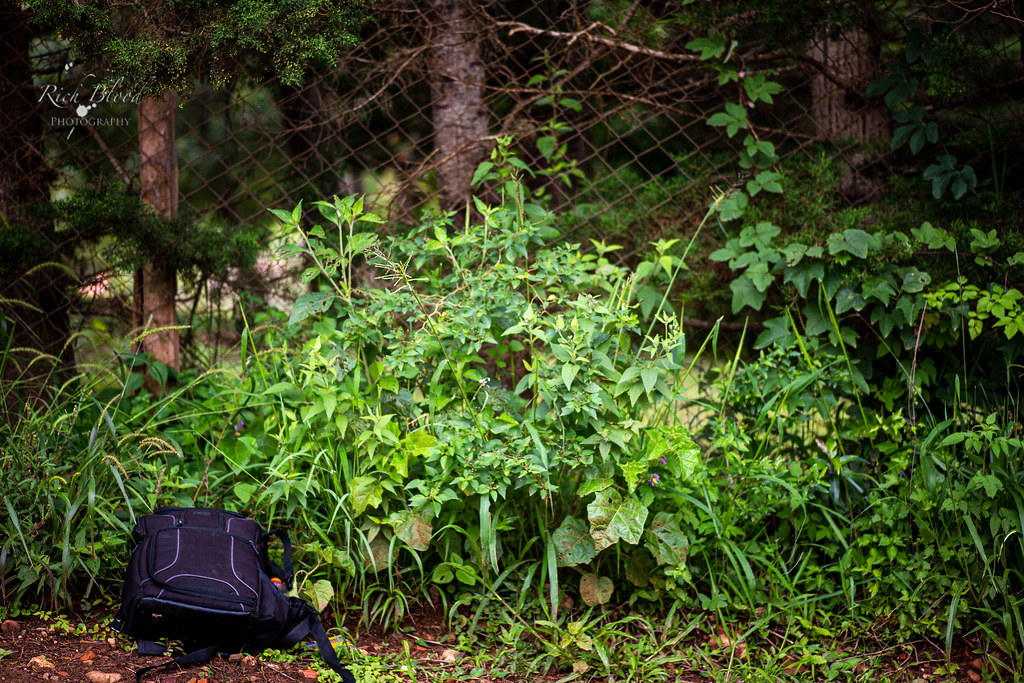
Roadside habitat with camera bag for scale

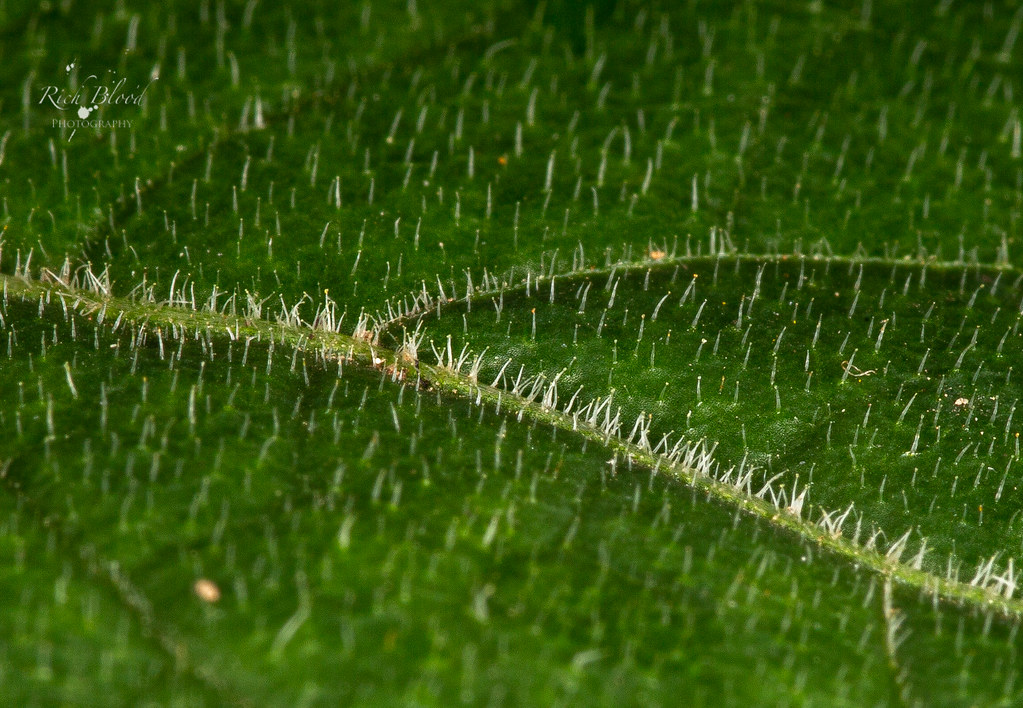
Glandular trichomes

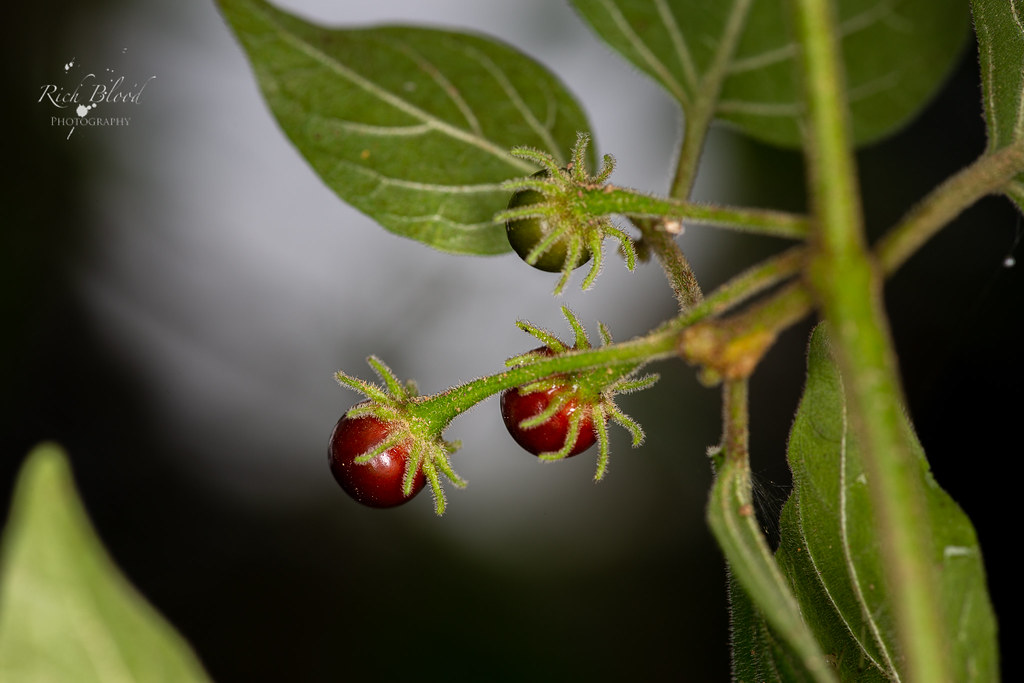
Calyx appendages and fruit color transition

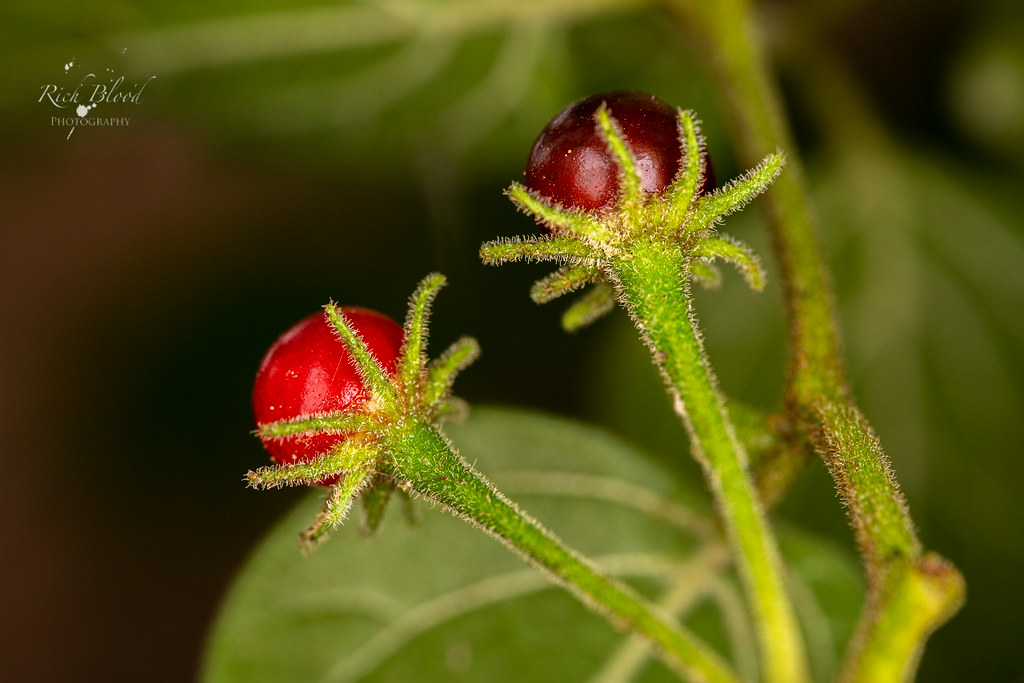
Ripe fruit and calyx appendages

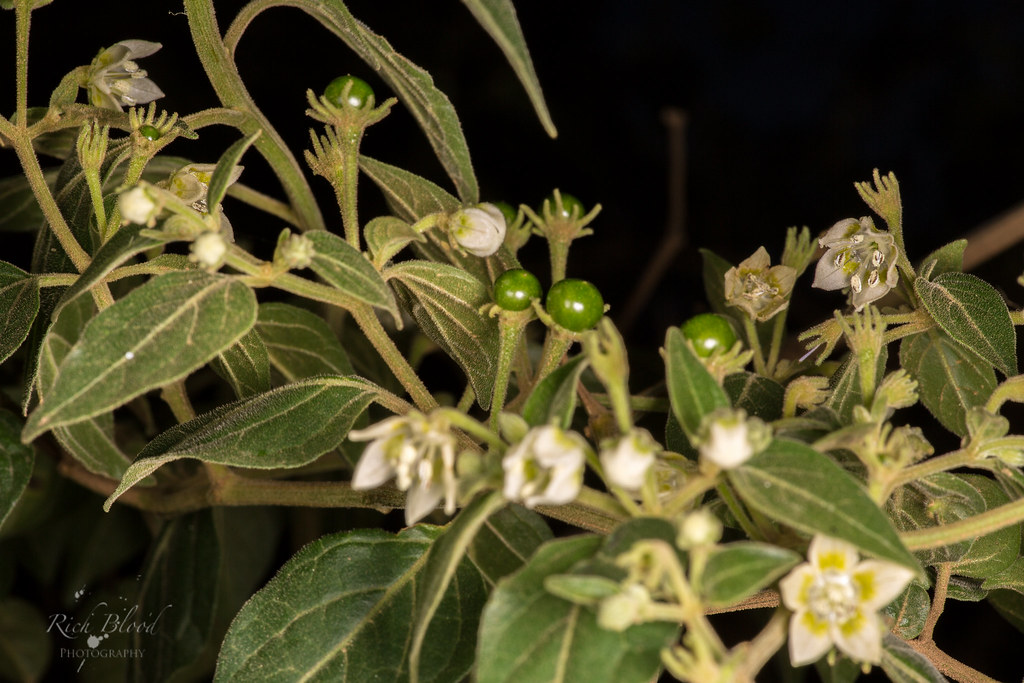
Flowers and immature fruit

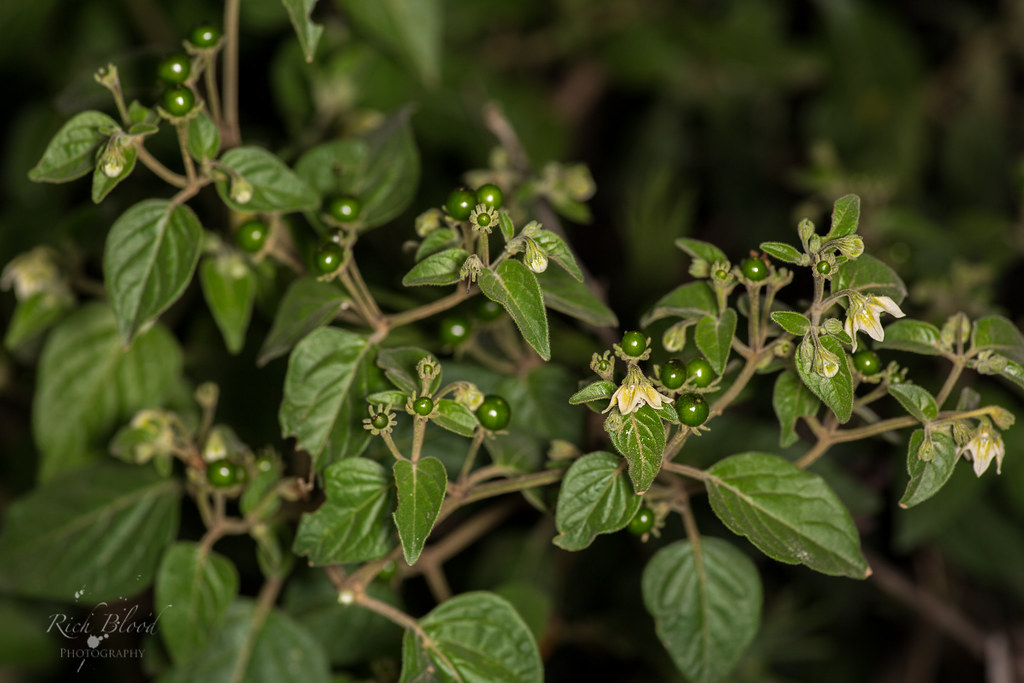
Branch morphology

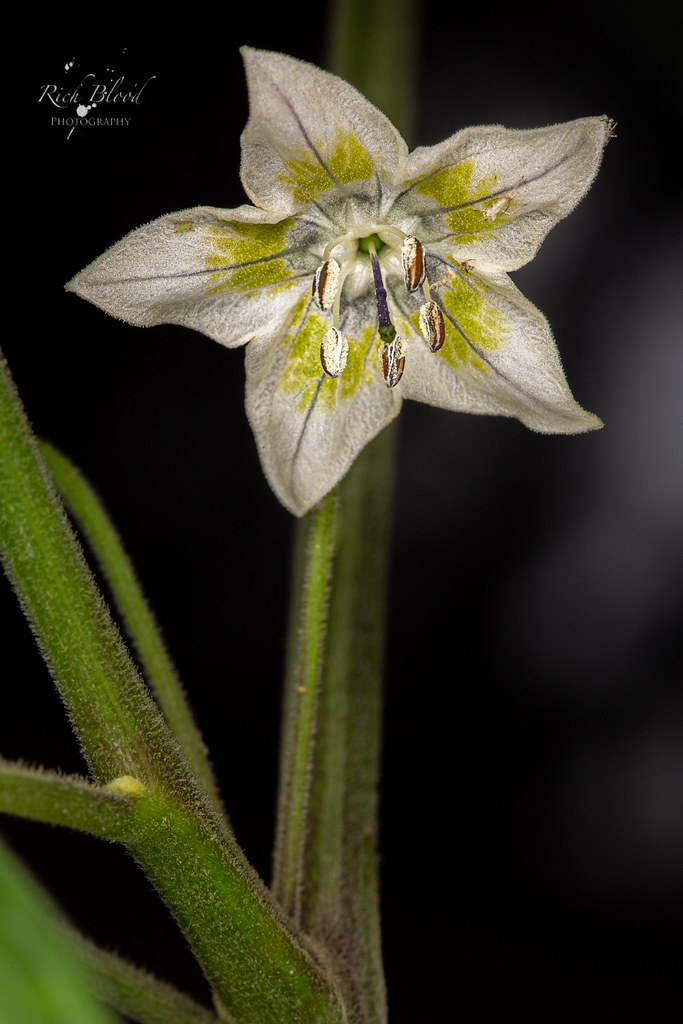
Flower morphology

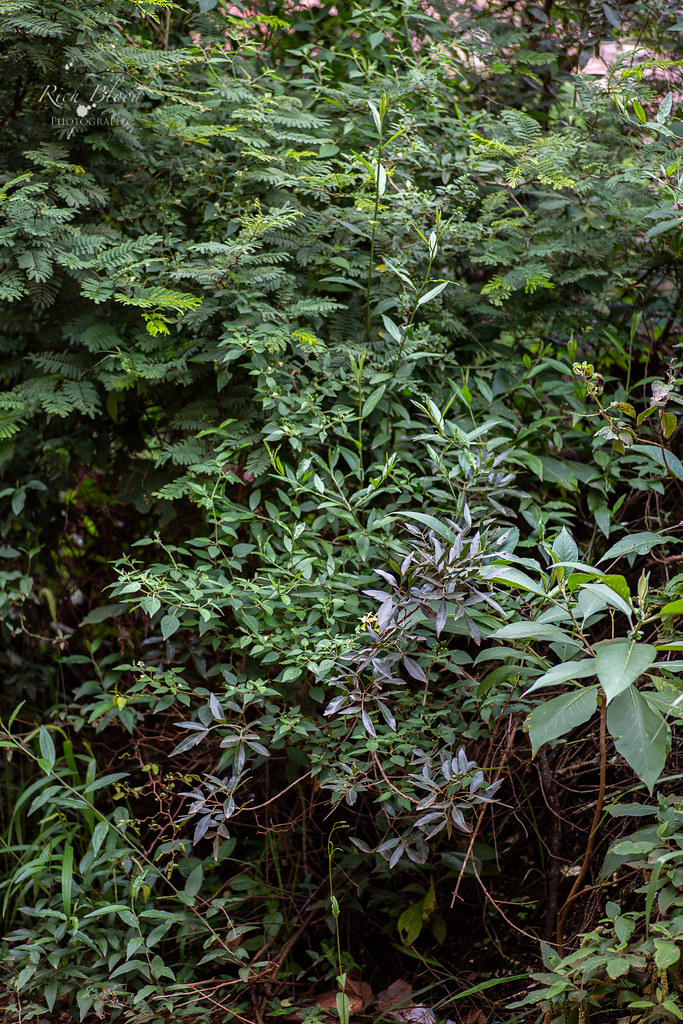
Roadside habitat in transition zones.

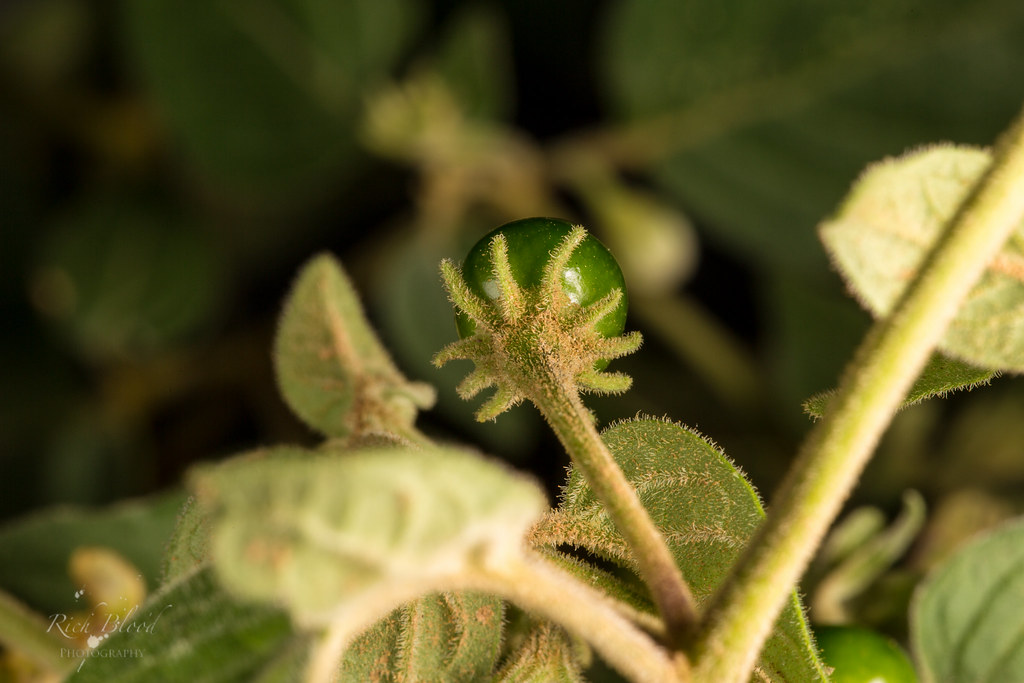
Calyx appendages

Capsicum eshbaughii is a perennial shrub or subshrub reaching 1–3 m (3.3–9.8 ft) in height. Stems are pale green when young and become grayish or light brown with age, often branching near the base and covered in a dense layer of glandular hairs that give the plant a slightly sticky texture. The leaves occur in pairs and are ovate, thin, and softly pubescent on both surfaces, appearing bright green above and grayish beneath.

The flowers are small and star-shaped, usually white with faint purple or greenish spots near the throat. Each flower has ten slender calyx appendages—a key feature distinguishing the species from other Bolivian wild peppers. The anthers are pale yellow, and the style is slightly longer than the stamens, with a rounded green stigma.

Fruits are small, spherical berries about 6–8 mm (0.24–0.31 in) in diameter that ripen from dark green to bright red. They are pungent, thick-walled, and contain 8–20 yellowish seeds with a faintly reticulate surface pattern. The fruiting calyx remains attached after ripening, another characteristic trait of the species.

== Habitat and distribution ==
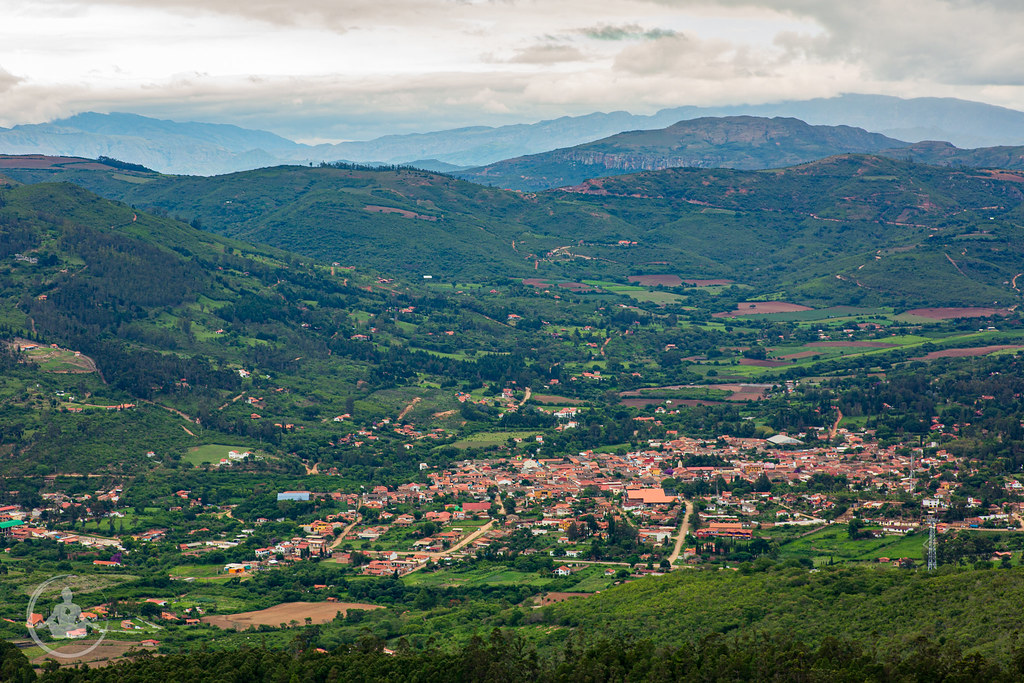
Capsicum eshbaughii native region Samaipata Bolivia

Capsicum eshbaughii is endemic to central Bolivia, where it occurs mainly in the Department of Santa Cruz, with one recorded collection from the Department of Cochabamba. It grows at mid-elevations between approximately 1,300 and 1,800 m (4,300 and 5,900 ft), occasionally up to 3,000 m (9,800 ft). The species inhabits semi-deciduous foothill forest, scrubland, and high-valley slopes near the southern margins of Amboró National Park, including the municipalities of Samaipata and Mairana. These areas form transitional ecotones between the Andean cloud-forest belt and the drier inter-Andean valleys of central Bolivia.

== Conservation status ==
Capsicum eshbaughii is listed as endangered, with a very limited known range and few surviving wild populations. Habitat disturbance from agriculture and grazing threatens its persistence. Continued in situ monitoring and ex situ propagation efforts have been recommended.
