= Vulcan (comics) =

Vulcan, in comics, may refer to:

- Vulcan (DC Comics), multiple superheroes in DC Comics, one of whom featured in Son of Vulcan
- Marvel Comics characters:
  - Vulcan (Marvel Comics), a character who is the brother of X-Men members Cyclops and Havok
  - Vulcan, another name for the Marvel Comics character Hephaestus (Marvel Comics)
  - Vulcan, an enemy of Black Goliath
  - Vulcan, a member of First Line
- Vulcan, a character from Charlton Comics, who has also appeared in Son of Vulcan
- Vulcan, a character from Fawcett Comics
- Vulcan (British comics), a British comic
- Vulcan, a character from Avatar Press

It may also refer to:

- Vulcann, a character from X-Men 2099
- Vulcanus, a DC Comics character who has appeared in Batman and the Outsiders

== See also ==
- Vulcan (disambiguation)
