= Volcano Island =

Volcano Island may refer to:

== Islands ==
- Volcanic island, an island of volcanic origin
- Taal Volcano, an island volcano in the Philippines
- Volcano Islands, a group of volcanic islands near Japan
- Vulcano Island, a small volcanic island in the Tyrrhenian Sea

== Other uses ==
- Nicktoons: Battle for Volcano Island, a 2006 Nicktoons crossover video game

== See also ==
- Volcano (disambiguation)
