= Volcana =

Volcana may refer to:

- Volcana (Marvel Comics)
- Volcana (DC Animated Universe)

== See also ==
- Volcano (disambiguation)
