= White Martian =

Fictional race of aliens in DC Comics

White Martians
- Interior artwork from JLA: Secret Files and Origins #3 (December 2000), art by Dale Eaglesham.

Publication information
- Publisher: DC Comics
- First appearance: Justice League of America #71 (March 1969)
- Created by: Dennis O'Neil (writer); Dick Dillin (artist)

Characteristics
- Place of origin: Mars
- Notable members: Miss Martian
- Inherent abilities: List: Martian physiology: Superhuman strength, speed, durability, and endurance; Regenerative healing factor; Invulnerability; Invisibility & intangibility (density shifting); Shapeshifting; Psionic/extrasensory abilities; Flight/Levitation; Telekinesis; Telekinetic blasts; Telekinetic force manipulation; Empathy; Mind link; Mind melding; Telepathy; Thought projection; Illusion-casting; Telepathic suggestion; Martian visual perception; Heat vision; Elasticity; Martian vision

The White Martians are one of four fictional extraterrestrial races native to Mars in the DC Comics' shared universe. White Martians, also known as Pale Martians, appear in the comics of the DC Universe, chiefly JLA, Martian Manhunter, and Son of Vulcan. They first appeared in Justice League of America #71 (May 1969).

== History ==
As a race of shapeshifters, physical appearance has little meaning for Martians, and the Greens and Whites are only separated by underlying psychological differences and philosophies, with the former being more peaceful and the latter more violent. The White Martians' preferred form is that of angular, hairless humanoids with chalky white skin with bony, armor-like ridges or plates.

It was eventually retconned that the White Martians and Green Martians were part of the same race, known as "The Burning". This race was belligerent and used fire to reproduce asexually. The Guardians of the Universe, fearing the Martians, split them into two species, gave them an instinctive fear of fire to prevent either from accessing their full potential, and altered their powers so neither could overcome the other. The timeframe for this genetic tampering was given as 20,000 years ago, contemporary with the early life of Vandal Savage on Earth.

While the Green Martians were peaceful philosophers, the White Martians were savage warriors. A lengthy civil war between the two races ended when the few surviving White Martians were exiled to the Still Zone, a dimension that is similar to, yet distinct from, the Phantom Zone.

=== White Saturnians ===
White Saturnians called Koolars are descended from an underclass of worker clones created by ancient White Martian explorers. Green Martians cloned Jemm's people, the original Red Saturnians, from themselves, and the White Martians cloned the original White Saturnians from themselves. The Reds were treated as equals by their creators, but the whites were treated as slaves by their masters. The enslavement of the white clones led to a civil war on Mars.

=== Hyperclan ===
The Hyperclan is a White Martian vanguard for an all-out takeover of Earth who masquerade as alien superheroes with the intent of displacing the JLA in the affections of the people of Earth. The Hyperclan members are known as Protex, Fluxus, A-Mortal, Züm, Primaid, Tronix, Armek and Zenturion, using the array of natural Martian powers to give each "hero" a seemingly different set of abilities; for example, Züm was a speedster, Armek was a massive armored figure with superhuman strength and could change color, and Fluxus was a shapeshifter. Their initial attack results in the destruction of the League's satellite and the death of Metamorpho and is preceded by a sickness that strikes all fire-based heroes and villains, such as Firehawk and Doctor Phosphorus, causing them to lose their powers. With the use of mind control and public relations, they nearly succeeded in brainwashing all of Earth into seeing the new Justice League as the villains, creating the illusion that the League were jealous of Hyperclan's pro-active efforts to eliminate villains and improve crop development in formerly barren areas. Despite the heroes scoring some victories in later confrontations, such as the Flash knocking out Züm with a punch at near-lightspeed or Green Lantern taking out Armek by exploiting the fact that they thought his ring was still vulnerable to yellow, Hyperclan eventually managed to capture all of the Justice League, keeping Superman tortured with a mental illusion of green kryptonite while trapping Wonder Woman, Flash, Green Lantern and Aquaman in the 'Flower of Wrath', a device that would kill the heroes in hideous agony when it closed, with Martian Manhunter having apparently decided to betray the others out of recognition of the fact that he would never be accepted.

However, Batman managed to evade capture after Hyperclan shot down the Batplane by taking advantage of their belief that he wasn't a threat because he was only human, deducing their true natures by their unwillingness to investigate his crashed and burning Batplane. Sneaking into Hyperclan's base, Batman knocked out one and then later three Hyperclan members by trapping them in a ring of fire. Putting the pieces together about Hyperclan's true nature, Superman eventually managed to throw off the Kryptonite illusion and free the rest of the League, aided by J'onzz, who had in reality realized Hyperclan's true nature when their base was revealed, pretending to betray the League and then posing as Armek to infiltrate Hyperclan. After Superman issued a public broadcast to the world that warned them of the threat and Hyperclan's weakness, the invaders were captured, and each of them was telepathically brainwashed by J'onzz and Aquaman to believe themselves to be human. Given strong mental blocks to inhibit their powers, the Martians assumed normal Earth lives all over the globe, although they were kept under observation by the League.

=== Sabotage of evolution ===
In JLA series 2 #4, Hyperclan leader Protex tells Superman how the White Martians came to Earth in ancient times before humans existed and performed genetic experiments on terrestrial animals which crippled the evolutionary potential of the human race, resulting in them lacking powers. This was another reason for the war between the White and Green Martians, who were outraged by such biological vandalism. According to the storylines in Martian Manhunter (#25 - 27) by John Ostrander, and Son of Vulcan (#5), the White Martians performed experiments that altered the metagene, enabling only a select few to develop metahuman powers. As punishment for this, the White Martians were exiled to the Still Zone.

=== The Bruce Wayne Martian ===
On subsequent occasions, the White Martians succeeded in breaking free of their psychological imprisonment. The first time, a single White Martian briefly believed itself to be Bruce Wayne due to the trauma of being caught in a flaming plane crash which erased the memory of its original human identity as an employee of Wayne Enterprises. Green Lantern, Steel, Big Barda, Orion and Plastic Man defeat the Martian and restore its original programming. The heroes make certain that the other Martians remain brainwashed, although Batman expressed some concern about their current strategy with the Martians.

=== Terror Incognita ===
The White Martians are resurrected after the Cathexis grants Martian Manhunter's wish, intending to cure his loneliness. The Martians capture various human psychics to expand their own mental abilities while simultaneously ridding Earth of oxygen, killing all humans. After traveling to the Phantom Zone to formulate a plan without the Martians learning of it, the Justice League returns to their dimension to face the Martians on the Moon. The Martians are forced to accept being banished into the Phantom Zone — a common punishment for DC's most dangerous super-villains — or dying on the Moon. Martian Manhunter is prepared to sacrifice himself to defeat the Martians, but is teleported to safety at the last second.

=== Metavirus ===
The White Martians created a metavirus, a metagene that could be passed between hosts via touch. This metavirus was responsible for the empowerment of the very first Son of Vulcan. The Sons of Vulcan passed the metavirus down in an unbroken line from then onwards, sworn to hunt and kill "the pale ones", i.e., the White Martians.

=== White Martian hybrids ===
With the help of Funky Flashman, an oviparous White Martian named A'monn A'mokk creates five human-Martian hybrid children named Sapling, Buster, Silhouette, Quaker and Blur, using superhuman DNA from unrevealed sources. The hybrids all have a latent fear of fire.

=== The Burning ===
JLA #89: Fernus vs. Plastic Man, art by Doug Mahnke.

When the Martian Manhunter overcomes his fear of fire, he inadvertently releases Fernus, a member of the primeval Martian race. Fernus - the manifestation of J'onn's racial memory of the Martians' original identity - takes possession of him and exterminates the White Martians. Fernus is eventually defeated by Plastic Man in a last desperate confrontation.

=== Miss Martian ===
Miss Martian, the White Martian known as M'gann M'orzz, is a member of the Teen Titans who joined the group during the year between the events depicted in Infinite Crisis and the One Year Later stories. She initially disguises herself as a Green Martian until being exposed by Bombshell.

=== Martian Manhunter miniseries ===
In this miniseries, several beings who appeared to be Green Martians were found alive on Earth. They were eventually revealed to be White Martians, under mind control and disguised as Greens; a Green Martian named Cay'An had brainwashed them to believe they were Green Martians. All of the White Martians were killed off by the series' end, except for a juvenile named Till'All. Till'All became friends with J'onn J'onzz, and was introduced to the Justice League at the end of the story.

=== Brightest Day ===
In the Brightest Day storyline, Martian Manhunter states that there are no other White Martians, although Till'All and Miss Martian are still alive.

== Powers and abilities ==
Like the Green Martians, White Martians have numerous superhuman powers, including superhuman strength/speed, flight, invisibility, telepathy, shape-changing, phase-shifting (sometimes called variable density) which allows them to be either invulnerably tough or completely immaterial, and "Martian vision", but they also share the Green Martians' vulnerability to fire. One of the White Martians disguised himself as the Hyperclan member Züm and had superhuman speed, though not on the level of the Flash. In Teen Titans vol.3 #41, Miss Martian was shown quickly recovering from the effects of Bombshell's neural scrambling powers as well as reforming after apparently having her head shot off. She was also shown in this appearance breaking a pair of handcuffs by waving her hand near them.

The phase-shifting ability is not depicted in their first post-Crisis appearance. Also, their power of flight initially seemed limited to within an atmosphere: a White Martian is defeated by Wonder Woman after succumbing to asphyxiation in outer space; however, the White Martians are later shown flying from Earth to the moon apparently without technological assistance and fighting the JLA in a vacuum.

== Known White Martians ==
- A-Mortal - A member of Hyperclan.
- A'Monn A'Mokk - A White Martian who fought Son of Vulcan.
- A'Morr - A'Mokk's wife.
- Armek - A member of Hyperclan who posed as a large robotic hero.
- Buster - The son of A'Monn A'Mokk and A'Morr, the brother of Quaker, and the sister of Silhouette.
- Blur - A White Martian analog to the Flash created by the species and Funky Flashman.
- Commander Blanx - A White Martian overlord.
- Dal'en - A White Martian who was brainwashed.
- Fluxus - A super-strong White Martian and member of Hyperclan who posed as a shapeshifting hero.
- Martian Man-Eater - A White Martian monster created by Malefic to fight Martian Manhunter.
- Micha'kel - A White Martian who was brainwashed.
- Miss Martian - A member of the Teen Titans.
- Primaid - The second-in-command of Hyperclan.
- Protex - The leader of the Hyperclan.
- Quaker - The son of A'Monn A'Mokk and A'Morr, the brother of Buster, and the sister of Silhouette.
- Silhouette - The daughter of A'Monn A'Mokk and A'Morr and the sister of Buster and Quake.
- Sy'rann - A White Martian who was brainwashed.
- Telok'tellar - A White Martian who was brainwashed.
- Till'all - A White Martian who is friends with Martian Manhunter.
- Tronix - A member of Hyperclan who posed as a superhero with flight and eye beams.
- Z'Kran Z'Rann - A White Martian and one of the first Green Lanterns.
- Zenturion - A member of Hyperclan.
- Züm - A member of Hyperclan who posed as a superhero with super-speed.

== Other versions ==
An entity called the White Martian appears in Absolute Martian Manhunter. This version is a otherworldly consciousness that embodies Anti-Life and seeks to cause chaos amongst humanity by influencing their minds with negative emotions and "bad ideas".

== In other media ==
=== Television ===
- A White Martian makes a non-speaking appearance in the Batman: The Brave and the Bold episode "The Rise of the Blue Beetle!" as a member of Kanjar Ro's pirate crew.
- The White Martians appear in Young Justice. This version of the species are a minority treated like second-class citizens by the Green majority.
- The White Martians appear in Supergirl.

=== Film ===
- The White Martians appear in a flashback in Justice League: Crisis on Two Earths.
- The White Martians appear in Justice League: Warworld.

=== Video games ===
- The White Martians appear in Justice League Heroes, with their leader voiced by Steve Blum. This version of the species was responsible for the extinction of the Green Martians.
- A-Mortal, Armek, Fluxus, Miss Martian, Primaid, Protex, Tronix, Zenturion, and Züm appear as character summons in Scribblenauts Unmasked: A DC Comics Adventure.

=== Miscellaneous ===
The White Martians appear in Batman: The Brave and the Bold #18.
