= Keron Grant =

Jamaican-American comic book artist (born 1976)

- Grant at Dragon Con in 2026
- Born: August 23, 1976 (age 50) Montego Bay
- Notable works: Action Comics; Fantastic Four; Iron Man; Legion of Super Heroes

Keron Grant (born August 23, 1976, in Montego Bay) is a Jamaican-American comic book artist, who has worked mostly for Marvel Comics.

His first published work was a pinup in the back of one of the final issues of Dale Keown's Pitt. His first steady comics work was drawing three issues of the unpublished Century comic from Rob Liefeld's Awesome Comics. His job drawing online comics for the Matrix series led to a short stint on Iron Man when Matrix comics inker Rob Stull brought Grant to the attention of Marvel editors.

== Selected works ==
- Action Comics #790
- Fantastic Four #57-59 (also cover on #58)
- Gazillion one-shot
- Iron Man #36 (cover pencils only) & 40–47, 48 (cover only)
- Kaboom vol. 2 #1-3
- Legion of Super Heroes #116
- Marvel Mangaverse Fantastic Four #1
- New Mutants vol. 2 #1-4
- New X-Men #134
- Son of Vulcan #1-6
- Spider-Man/Doctor Octopus: Out of Reach #1-4
- Weapon X #6
- X-Men Unlimited #39, 42
- Young Justice 80-page giant-sized issue
