= Vulcain =

Vulcain is French for Vulcan.

Vulcain may refer to:

- Vulcain (watch company), a Swiss watch manufacturer established in 1858 and inventor of the alarm complication for wristwatches
- Vulcain (rocket engine), a family of European first-stage engines for the Ariane 5 and Ariane 6
- Vulcain (ship), a number of ships named Vulcain
  - Vulcain (M611), part of the French Navy, for sweeping mines
- Vulcain (band), a French heavy metal band
- Vulcain Prize, full name, "Vulcain Prize of the Technical Artist", independent film award for feature films at the Cannes Film Festival official selection rewarding a technician for his collaboration in the creation of a film

== See also ==
- Vulcan (disambiguation)
- La Forge de Vulcain (Vulcan's Forge) is book published in 1973, the third book from Yoko Tsuno comic book series written by Roger Leloup
