= Vulcan =

Vulcan may refer to:

== Mythology ==
- Vulcan (mythology), the god of fire, volcanoes, metalworking, and the forge in Roman mythology

== Arts, entertainment and media ==
=== Film and television ===
- Vulcan (Star Trek), name of a fictional race and their home planet and language in the Star Trek franchise
- Black Vulcan, a fictional African American superhero on the animated series Super Friends
- Kamen Rider Vulcan, a character in the series Kamen Rider Zero-One
- Vulcan, a fictional planet in the Doctor Who story The Power of the Daleks

=== Literature ===
- Vulcan (Fleetway), a 1975–1976 IPC Comic
- Vulcan (DC Comics), a fictional character
- Vulcan (Marvel Comics), a supervillain
- Vulcan!, a 1978 Star Trek novel by Kathleen Sky
- The Vulcan, a magazine from various organizations within the Young Fine Gael
- Vulcan, a gay pornography magazine, made famous in a High Court test case by serial killer Dennis Nilsen
- Vulcan, a fictional series of artificial intelligences (Vulcan 2 and 3) in Vulcan's Hammer
- Vulcan (comics), several meanings

=== Other arts, entertainment and media ===
- Vulcan statue, the world's largest cast-iron statue and the city symbol of Birmingham, Alabama, US
- Vulcan (EP), an EP by Snake River Conspiracy
- Vulcan, an album by Chris Wood
- Vulcan Raven, a character in the Metal Gear Solid video games
- Aegis Vulcan, a spaceship in the Star Citizen video game
- "Vulcan Bomber", a song by Nebula from the 1998 EP Let It Burn

== Volcanoes ==
- Vulcano or Vulcan, an active volcano island in Italy
- Vulcan (volcano), a volcano in Papua New Guinea
- Vulcan (inactive volcano), a dormant volcano in Albuquerque, New Mexico, US

== Places ==
=== Canada ===
- Vulcan, Alberta, a town in the province of Alberta
  - Vulcan Airport
  - Vulcan County, a municipal district
  - RCAF Station Vulcan, a former Commonwealth and RCAF training station

=== Romania ===
- Vulcan, Brașov, a commune in Brașov County
- Vulcan, Hunedoara, a city in Hunedoara County
- Vulcan, a village in Apold Commune, Mureș County
- Vulcan, a village in Ciuruleasa Commune, Alba County
- Blăjeni-Vulcan, a village in Blăjeni Commune, Hunedoara County
- Buceș-Vulcan, a village in Buceș Commune, Hunedoara County

=== United States ===
- Vulcan, Colorado, a ghost town, where Vulcanite was discovered
- Vulcan, Michigan
- Vulcan, Missouri
- Vulcan, West Virginia

=== Extraterrestrial ===
- Vulcan Planitia, a plain on Pluto's moon Charon

== Science and technology ==
- Vulcan (hypothetical planet), a hypothetical planet once thought to be between Mercury and the Sun
- Vulcanoid, a hypothetical population of asteroids between Mercury and the Sun
- Vulcan (programming language), a database/programming language, now known as dBase
- Vulcan laser, a laser at the Rutherford Appleton Laboratory, England
- Vulcan palm (Brighamia insignis), a plant

== Military ==
- Avro Vulcan, a British delta-winged strategic bomber
- HMS Vulcan, various ships
- USS Vulcan, three ships
- M163 VADS (Vulcan Air Defense System), a US self-propelled, antiaircraft Gatling gun
- M167 VADS (Vulcan Air Defense System), a US Army towed, short-range, antiaircraft Gatling gun
- M61 Vulcan, a 20mm six-barreled Gatling gun
- Vulcan M-11-9, a semiautomatic, closed-bolt pistol manufactured by Vulcan Armament
- Vulcan, alternate name for the Malyuk assault rifle

== Organisations ==
- Vulcan (Turku shipyard), a former shipyard in Turku, Finland
- AG Vulcan Stettin, a former German shipbuilding and locomotive building company near Stettin, Germany (now Szczecin, Poland)
- Vulcan (motor vehicles), a car and commercial vehicle manufacturer based in Southport, England
- Vulcan Foundry, a former British locomotive builder, and "Vulcan village" workers cottages
- Vulcan Iron Works, several mechanical engineering companies in the nineteenth century in England and the US
- Vulcan Materials Company, a construction materials company headquartered in Birmingham, Alabama, US
- Vulcan Inc., an investment company formed by Microsoft co-founder Paul Allen
- Vulcan Software, a British computer game company
- Vulcan Capital Management, a US private equity firm
- Vulcan (Polish software company), a Polish educational software company
- Vulcan Elements, an American rare-earth magnet manufacturing company

== Sports ==
- Vulcan changeup, a type of baseball pitch
- Auckland Vulcans, a rugby league team that plays in the NSW Cup
- Birmingham Vulcans, a 1975 World Football League team
- California Vulcans, the sports teams of California University of Pennsylvania
- The Vulcans, the athletic teams of the University of Hawaii at Hilo

== Vehicles ==
=== Cars and motorcycles ===
- Aston Martin Vulcan, a 2015 sports car only for the racetrack
- Ford Vulcan engine, an automobile engine
- Kawasaki Vulcan, a series of cruiser-type motorcycles

=== Trains ===
- NZR RM class (Vulcan), a former type of railroad car found in preservation in New Zealand
- Vulcan (1874-1892), a South Devon Railway Buffalo class steam locomotives
- Vulcan (1951-1967), a BR 'Britannia' Class locomotive
- Vulcan, a British Rail Class 47 diesel locomotive no: D1676 (later 47090, 47623, 47843), used since April 1965

=== Other vehicles ===
- Vickers Vulcan, a biplane airliner of the 1920s
- Vulcan Centaur, a rocket launch system developed by United Launch Alliance
- Vulcan (barge) (1819), the world's first all iron-hulled boat

== Other uses ==
- Vulcan (surname)
- Operation Vulcan (1943), an Allied action in Tunisia during World War II
- The Vulcan, Cardiff, a former historic public house in Wales
- Vulcan Hotel (Saint Bathans), Saint Bathans, New Zealand
- The Vulcans, George W. Bush's foreign policy advisory team for the 2000 U.S. election
- California Vulcans, the intercollegiate sports teams of Pennsylvania Western University California
- Vulcan Nuclear Reactor Testing Establishment, in Dounreay, Scotland

== See also ==
- Volcan (disambiguation)
- Vulcain (disambiguation)
- Vulcana (1875–1946), Welsh female bodybuilder
- Vulcanair, an Italian-based manufacturer of light twin-engined aircraft
- Vulcanization, a chemical process to improve the strength and durability of rubber
- Vulcanite, a rare copper telluride mineral
- Vulcano (disambiguation)
- Vulkan (disambiguation)
