= Volkan (disambiguation) =

Volkan is a Turkish masculine given name and a surname. It may also refer to:

- Volkan (newspaper), an Ottoman daily published in period 1908–1909
- VOLKAN, a Turkish-Cypriot nationalist group
