= The Crosslands =

Scottish pub

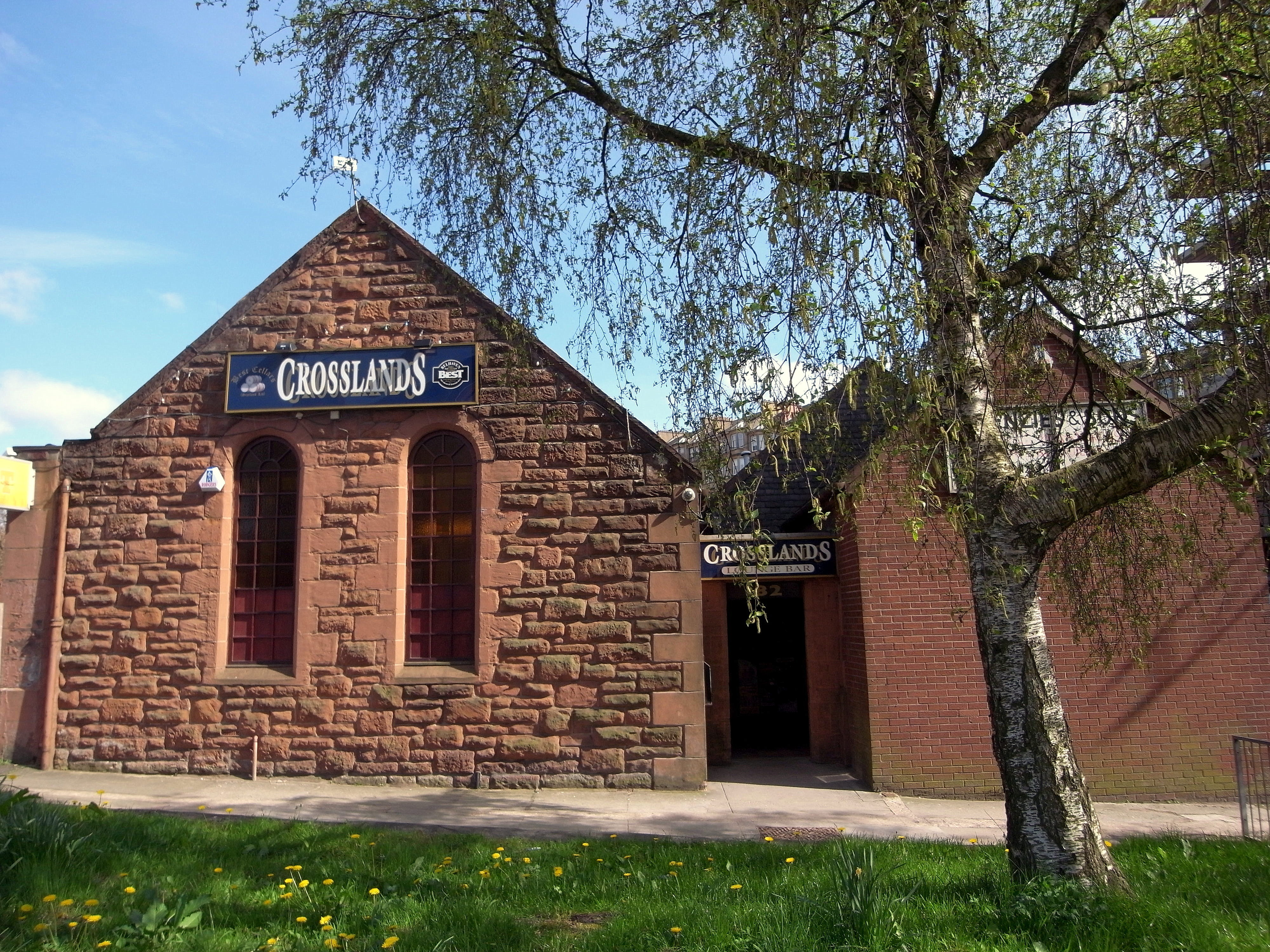
The Crosslands in 2011

Crosslands was a public house in the Maryhill area of Glasgow, Scotland, that featured in the 1996 film Trainspotting. It is now known as BrewHaus.

== Location ==
The pub is located on the north end of Queen Margaret Drive, Glasgow.

== History ==
The building was originally constructed as a Baptist Chapel.

In 2015, the historically working-class pub was given a £40,000 refurbishment by new owners Kained Holdings in an attempt to attract more middle-class customers. In 2016, it was known as The Kelbourne Saint and by 2022 it was called BrewHaus.

== Feature in Trainspotting ==
The Crosslands appears in a scene in Danny Boyle's 1996 Trainspotting, in the scene character Francis "Franco" Begbie throws a pint glass from the pubs mezzanine area to the area below, injuring a female patron and starting a fight.

The film's producers paid the pub's owners £700 and its customers £20 each plus free drinks to get their approval to shoot the scene.

== See also ==
- The Volcano (nightclub)
