= Mairana =

Mairana La Perla de los Valles Cruceños
- Town
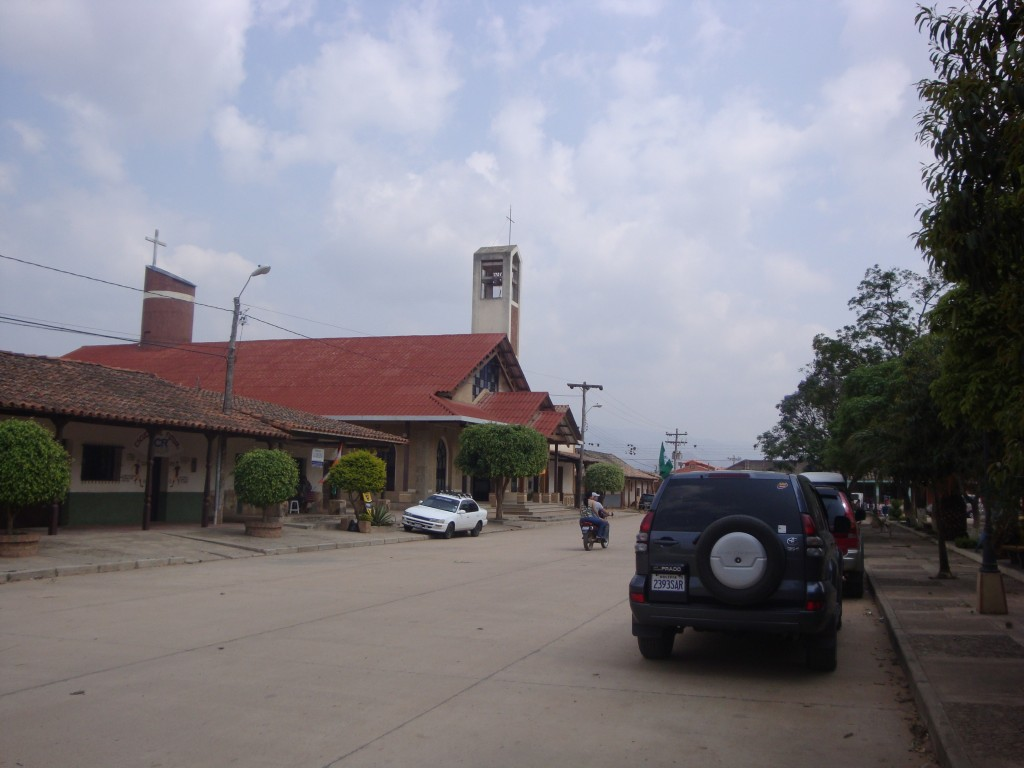

- Location in Bolivia
- Coordinates: 18°7′S 63°57′W
- Country: Bolivia
- Department: Santa Cruz Department
- Province: Florida Province
- Municipality: Mairana Municipality

Population (2001)
  - Total: 3,884
- Time zone: UTC-4 (BOT)

Mairana is a small town in Bolivia.

== Climate ==
Climate data for Mairana, elevation 1,350 m (4,430 ft)
Month	Jan	Feb	Mar	Apr	May	Jun	Jul	Aug	Sep	Oct	Nov	Dec	Year
Mean daily maximum °C (°F)	28.7 (83.7)	28.4 (83.1)	28.5 (83.3)	27.2 (81.0)	25.7 (78.3)	24.5 (76.1)	24.4 (75.9)	25.9 (78.6)	27.3 (81.1)	28.2 (82.8)	28.7 (83.7)	29.2 (84.6)	27.2 (81.0)
Daily mean °C (°F)	22.9 (73.2)	22.6 (72.7)	22.4 (72.3)	21.1 (70.0)	19.4 (66.9)	18.2 (64.8)	17.7 (63.9)	19.0 (66.2)	20.6 (69.1)	21.9 (71.4)	22.4 (72.3)	23.0 (73.4)	20.9 (69.7)
Mean daily minimum °C (°F)	17.0 (62.6)	16.8 (62.2)	16.3 (61.3)	15.0 (59.0)	13.1 (55.6)	11.8 (53.2)	11.1 (52.0)	12.2 (54.0)	13.9 (57.0)	15.6 (60.1)	16.1 (61.0)	16.8 (62.2)	14.6 (58.4)
Average precipitation mm (inches)	116.1 (4.57)	102.0 (4.02)	84.0 (3.31)	44.7 (1.76)	24.7 (0.97)	20.4 (0.80)	13.5 (0.53)	23.0 (0.91)	27.2 (1.07)	53.3 (2.10)	65.0 (2.56)	100.3 (3.95)	674.2 (26.55)
Average precipitation days	10.4	9.6	8.8	5.9	4.2	3.3	2.8	3.1	3.7	5.3	6.5	8.5	72.1
Average relative humidity (%)	72.9	73.1	73.1	73.1	72.5	70.6	67.1	63.5	61.8	63.5	65.8	69.4	68.9
Source: Servicio Nacional de Meteorología e Hidrología de Bolivia
