= Volcán Lake =

Lake in Florida Province, Santa Cruz Department, Bolivia

Laguna Volcán
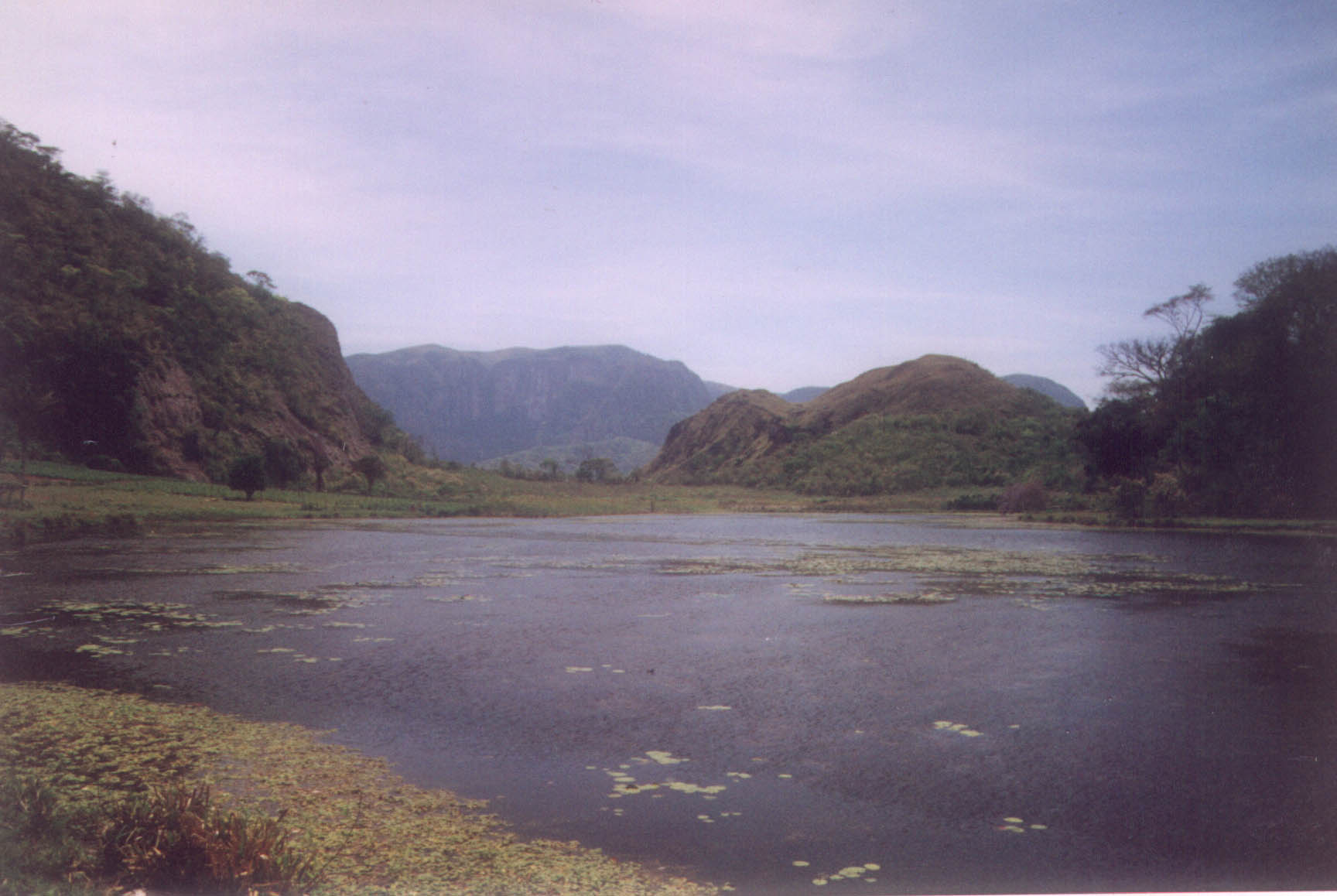
- Laguna Volcán inside the crater at the cleft in the crater wall where the road enters

- Location within Bolivia Location within South America
- Interactive map of Laguna Volcán
- Location: Florida Province, Santa Cruz Department
- Coordinates: 18°07′13″S 63°38′50″W
- Basin countries: Bolivia
- Max. length: 436 metres (1,430 ft)
- Max. width: 190 metres (620 ft)
- Surface area: 0.059 km^{2} (0.023 sq mi)

Laguna Volcán is a lake in the Florida Province of the Santa Cruz Department in Bolivia. It is a lake in the crater of an extinct volcano. Lake has dimensions of 436 meters (1,430 ft) long by 190 meters (620 ft) wide and a surface of 0.059 km^{2} (0.023 sq mi).

== Access ==
Laguna Volcán is located near the Amboró National Park and the towns of Cuevas and Bermejo. There is vehicular access through a cleft in the crater wall. A footpath encircles the lake.
