= Volcanic City =

Volcanic City was on the east side of the Granby River, near Volcanic Creek, in the Boundary region of south central British Columbia. The ghost town is about 18 kilometres (11 mi) by road north of Grand Forks, via North Fork Rd.

== Brown's Camp ==
Brown's Camp, first mentioned in 1895, comprised a large mining area that spanned both sides of the Granby River (North Fork of the Kettle River). The expanse stretched as far west as Phoenix/Eholt (overlapping Summit Camp lying to its west) and about 23 kilometres (14 mi) north to the Pathfinder claim. Brown's Camp also refers to a more specific location at about the 19-kilometre (12 mi) mark north.

== Volcanic Mine ==
Around 1886, Prospector A. R. "Volcanic" Brown staked the Volcanic Mine claim on the western slope of Volcanic Mountain, as unofficially known. He later gave the year as 1882 but the earliest mention was a decade later. Although a syndicate obtained an option on the mine, no production ensued. Over the years, a tunnel was lengthened to 274 metres (900 ft) but did not reach a paying ore body. As late as 1929, a well maintained private road ran from the highway. Brown remained open to serious offers to acquire the property. The location was at about the 18-kilometre (11 mi) mark north.

== Volcanic City ==
Believing his copper claim to be exceptional, Brown proclaimed once production commenced, he would build a city that disallowed schools, churches and banks. This reflected his unusual views on such institutions. The planned settlement never grew beyond one building, because the mine exploration proved unsuccessful. However, when the Kettle Valley Line was constructing a branch northward from Grand Forks in 1906, which passed nearby, Brown more actively promoted his townsite. Whether a survey occurred is unclear, but the name remained in use at least until 1927.

== Eagle City ==
A mile from Volcanic City at about the 16-kilometre (10 mi) mark north, Arthur Williamson ran a general store. Equating to 19 kilometres (12 mi) up the winding river, Toronto House existed from 1897. Hotelier Henry Peter Toronto operated the establishment, which had a large bar, dining room, and four rooms up and four rooms down for guest accommodation. When applying for a post office in 1899, the name Volcanic City was proposed, but amended to Toronto, when Brown argued that name for his development. The Toronto name soon revised to Eagle City, possibly because of proximity to the Golden Eagle mining claim found at about the 15-kilometre (9 mi) mark north. The settlement was a survey camp during the railway construction. The final newspaper mention was in 1911. The hotel was demolished in 1925. To the south, Toronto Creek honours the man.

== See also ==
- "1899 Kootenay map". www.library.ubc.ca. p. 1. for Volcanic Mine.
