= Mickey Volcan =

Canadian ice hockey player (born 1962)

- Born: March 3, 1962 (age 64) Edmonton, Alberta, Canada
- Height: 6 ft 0 in (183 cm)
- Weight: 180 lb (82 kg; 12 st 12 lb)
- Position: Defence
- Shot: Right
- Played for: Hartford Whalers; Calgary Flames
- NHL draft: 50th overall, 1980; Hartford Whalers
- Playing career: 1980–1991

Michael Stephen Volcan (born March 3, 1962) is a Canadian former professional ice hockey defenceman. He was drafted by the Hartford Whalers in the third round of the 1980 NHL entry draft and played 162 games in his NHL career. As the 1980 draft was the first to allow the drafting of 18-year-olds, Volcan was the youngest player in the NHL in the 1980–81 season. During his tenure with the Whalers, Volcan shared the distinction of becoming the first active player to officiate an NHL game.

== Early and personal life ==
Volcan was born on March 3, 1962, in Edmonton, Alberta, to parents Sylvia and Mike. His father was a professional football player in the Canadian Football League. Volcan's brother Marty and his nephew Nolan are also ice hockey players and both played in the Western Hockey League. Volcan is of Czechoslovak descent.

== Career ==
=== Minor hockey and college ===
Growing up in Edmonton, Volcan played both baseball and ice hockey. He represented Jasper Place Two in the 1974 Alberta District Number Two Little League major division of baseball playoffs. Due to his skills, Volcan often played above his age level in minor hockey. He spent his pee-wee years with a Bantam team and played midget ice hockey in his first year of Bantam eligibility at the age of 13. (Note: Bantam players are typically 14 years old and under, while midget players are 17 years old and under.) Volcan signed with the St. Albert Saints of the Alberta Junior Hockey League (AJHL) in 1976 at the age of 15. After participating in the Portland Winter Hawks' 1977 training camp, Volcan was reassigned to the St. Albert Saints for the 1977–78 season. He finished his rookie season second in voting for the AJHL's Rookie of the Year and was promoted to the Winter Hawks for the 1978 Western Canada Hockey League (WCHL) playoffs. He scored his first goal of the playoffs on April 8 but the Winter Hawks were eliminiated in the same game.

Volcan returned to the Saints for the 1978–79 season, where he passed his previous season's total despite playing in fewer games. He was recognized with the AJHL's Most Valuable Defenceman award and a place on the All-Star team. While competing, Volcan also fast-tracked his schooling so he would be eligible for college at the age of 17. After the Saints were eliminated, he was again called up by the Winter Hawks for the 1979 playoffs. Volcan fielded offers from nine universities before accepting a hockey scholarship for the University of North Dakota Fighting Sioux. Upon joining the Fighting Sioux at the age of 17, he became the youngest player in the entire conference. Volcan scored his first collegiate goal on November 16, 1979, against the St. Lawrence Saints. He was unable to find regular playing time during the season and finished with two goals and 14 assists. Volcan was drafted in the third round, 50th overall, by the Hartford Whalers in the 1980 NHL entry draft. This was the first year that the NHL allowed teams to draft 18-year-olds.

=== Professional ===
Following the draft, Volcan joined the Hartford Whalers for their 1979 training camp. Although the Whalers wanted him to return to school, Volcan persuaded them to give him a chance. Volcan surprised the Whalers' director of hockey operations, Jack Kelley, and head coach Don Blackburn during his time at camp with his poise and maturity. As a result, Volcan beat out fellow rookie Fred Arthur for a roster spot and signed a multi-year contract with the team on October 9. Volcan stated that even if the Whalers did not sign him, he would still have left the Fighting Sioux for Tier 1 hockey in Canada. Upon making his NHL debut, he became the youngest player in the 1980–81 season. Volcan tallied his first NHL point on October 15, 1980, by assisting on Steve Alley's goal against the Pittsburgh Penguins to help the Whalers earn their first win of the season. While he was limited to two assists through his first 17 games, Volcan was repeatedly praised by Kelley and Blackburn for playing beyond their expectations. He scored his first NHL goal on January 15, 1981, in a 5–4 loss to the Los Angeles Kings. He scored two goals and 11 assists through 50 NHL games before being reassigned to the Whalers American Hockey League (AHL) affiliate, the Binghamton Whalers. One of the reasons for his reassignment was due to the return of Thommy Abrahamsson. Volcan scored his first goal in his debut game against the Springfield Indians. However, he missed numerous games at the end of his season with the Indians due to a charley horse and hand injury. He finished the regular season with Binghamton collecting 10 points through 24 games.

After attending the Whalers' preseason training camp, Volcan was returned to the AHL for the 1981–82 season. However, due to a separated shoulder, he was expected to miss the first three weeks of the regular season. He returned to the lineup at the end of October and scored his first points of the season in his third game back. On November 20, Volcan was recalled to the NHL level, but his debut was delayed due to a snowstorm. He was recalled again in December but suffered another injury later that month. He scored his first goal of the season with the Whalers on December 27 against the Toronto Maple Leafs. When he was returned to the AHL on February 20, Volcan was advised by the coaching staff to be more disciplined with his play if he wanted to return to the NHL level. Due to the Whalers low place in the standings, Whalers head coach Larry Pleau stated he was comfortable slowly acclimating Volcan into the NHL. Volcan helped push the Binghamton Whalers to the 1982 Calder Cup Finals against the New Brunswick Hawks. He suffered a bruised jaw in Game 2 and sat out one game before returning for Game 4.

Volcan returned to the Hartford Whalers for their training camp but was hospitalized with a viral infection. He missed the entirety of training camp due to the virus but was expected to be healthy enough to start the 1982–83 season with the Whalers. By the start of November, Volcan had accumulated one goal and two assists for three points. He suffered a hairline fracture in his right wrist in December and missed numerous games to recover. Due to this injury, he was a scratch for the Whalers game against the New Jersey Devils on January 15, 1983. When a snowstorm prevented a referee and a linesman from reaching the Hartford Civic Center, Volcan and opponent Garry Howatt became the first active players to officiate an NHL game. Due to the suddenness of the request, Volcan and Howatt donned black sweats and practice jerseys instead of typical official uniforms. While their time as substitute officials only lasted one period, Volcan was presented with a proper refereeing jersey as a memento. He finished the regular season with four goals and 13 assists through 68 games. On July 5, 1983, Volcan was traded to the Calgary Flames in exchange for Joel Quenneville and Richie Dunn.

== Post-retirement ==
In 1992, Volcan became the assistant coach for the Arizona State Ice Devils. He was promoted to head coach in 1999. As this was an unpaid position, he also taught power-skating at the Cellular One Ice Den. Starting in 2000, Volcan also ran an ice hockey academy in Flagstaff, Arizona.

== Career statistics ==
			Regular season					Playoffs
Season	Team	League	GP	G	A	Pts	PIM	GP	G	A	Pts	PIM
1977–78	St. Albert Saints	AJHL	60	28	40	68	106	—	—	—	—	—
1977–78	Portland Winter Hawks	WCHL	—	—	—	—	—	8	1	1	2	2
1978–79	St. Albert Saints	AJHL	49	20	49	69	107	5	2	2	4	4
1978–79	Portland Winter Hawks	WHL	—	—	—	—	—	4	1	0	1	0
1979–80	University of North Dakota	WCHA	33	2	14	16	38	—	—	—	—	—
1980–81	Hartford Whalers	NHL	49	2	11	13	26	—	—	—	—	—
1980–81	Binghamton Whalers	AHL	24	1	9	10	26	6	0	0	0	14
1981–82	Hartford Whalers	NHL	26	1	5	6	29	—	—	—	—	—
1981–82	Binghamton Whalers	AHL	33	4	13	17	47	14	4	8	12	40
1982–83	Hartford Whalers	NHL	68	4	13	17	73	—	—	—	—	—
1983–84	Calgary Flames	NHL	19	1	4	5	18	—	—	—	—	—
1983–84	Colorado Flames	CHL	30	8	9	17	20	5	0	0	0	11
1984–85	Moncton Golden Flames	AHL	63	8	14	22	44	—	—	—	—	—
1985–86	Nova Scotia Oilers	AHL	66	12	36	48	114	—	—	—	—	—
1986–87	Baltimore Skipjacks	AHL	72	8	36	44	118	—	—	—	—	—
1987–88	JYP Jyväskylä	FIN	29	7	4	11	78	—	—	—	—	—
1988–89	EV Landshut	GER	16	9	15	24	49	—	—	—	—	—
1988–89	EHC Chur	NLB	7	6	4	10	26	—	—	—	—	—
1989–90	Krefelder EV 1981	GER-2	25	8	27	35	60	—	—	—	—	—
1989–90	SC Riessersee	GER-2	10	5	7	12	39	—	—	—	—	—
1990–91	Phoenix Roadrunners	IHL	59	13	29	42	103	11	0	6	6	11
AHL totals			258	33	108	141	349	20	4	8	12	54
NHL totals			162	8	33	41	146	—	—	—	—	—
