= Vulcan (surname) =

Vulcan is a Romanian language surname. Notable people with the surname include:

- Iosif Vulcan (1841–1907), magazine editor and cultural figure
- Samuil Vulcan (1758–1839), Greek-Catholic bishop, great-uncle of Iosif Vulcan
