= Robert Allan Brown =

Canadian prospector

Robert Allan Brown (c. 1849–1931) was a well-known and flamboyant prospector and speculator in the 19th and early 20th centuries, in the Canadian province of British Columbia. He was known generally as Volcanic Brown, especially in the province's Kootenay and Boundary districts, as well as adjoining Eastern Washington. He was known as Sunset Brown in the Similkameen District, and to others as Crazy Brown. His enthusiastic nature and flamboyant personality made him a fixture in mining industry news over a wide region, spanning the British Columbia-United States border.

Brown was prominent in the Boundary Country and Inland Empire mining industries, in capacities ranging from being a notable and very successful prospector, through to being a speculator, promoter and investor. He was also the founder of Volcanic City, one of the many short-lived mining and smelting towns of the Boundary Country. He was a prominent presence in many mining districts throughout the region, leading the way in discoveries of several important orebodies, although he never became wealthy.

== Name origin ==
Brown's name derived from his theory that the richest copper deposits in the region had not yet been located. He believed it would be found in abundance where there had been volcanic activity, so spent much of his life searching the Boundary Country for that evidence.

== Demise ==
In later years, he took up the story of the fabled lost goldmine near Pitt Lake, and is believed to have died in the country beyond the upper valley of the Pitt River. A camp was found at the foot of the Stave Glacier, at the head of the Stave River, the next basin east of the Pitt's upper course. Found at the camp was a glass jar containing 11 ounces of gold, but no remains, not even his solid gold dentures. (Other versions of this story say it was his solid gold dentures found in the jar.)

== Legacy ==
As well as Volcanic City, places named for Volcanic Brown include Volcanic Creek and Brown Creek, which enter the Granby River 15 km upstream from the town of Grand Forks, near the site of Volcanic City.
