= The Volcano (nightclub) =

Scottish nightclub

The Volcano was a nightclub in Glasgow that featured in the 1996 film Trainspotting.

== Location ==
The nightclub was located on 15 Benalder Street in Partick Cross, close to Kelvinhall subway station.

== History ==
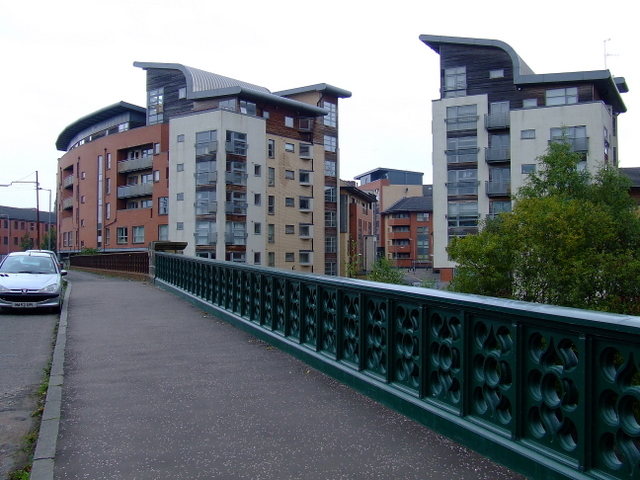
Housing that replaced The Volcano on Benalder Street

The nightclub was previously known as Cinders Disco, then Raffles before being purchased by Colin Barr in 1989, who turned it into The Volcano. The name was chosen in honour of Glaswegian disc-jockey Gordon Lyle who was murdered in a Florida carpark after working in La Volcanic nightclub owned by Frank Lynch around the same time that Barr purchased the club. The low-budget interior of the club was designed by Ron McCulloch.

The building was demolished and the lot remained vacant for some time before being redeveloped for residential units.

== Feature in Trainspotting ==
The Volcano appears in a scene in Danny Boyle's 1996 film Trainspotting, in the scene character Mark Renton meets Diane.

The suggestion to use the location to shoot the scene was made to Boyle by Bobby Paterson, the bass guitarist of Love and Money band.

== See also ==
- The Crosslands
