= Mike Volcan =

Profile
- Positions: Guard, Tackle

Personal information
- Born: September 17, 1932; Hamilton, Ontario
- Died: June 25, 2013 (aged 80); Edmonton, Alberta
- Listed height: 5 ft 11 in (1.80 m)
- Listed weight: 215 lb (98 kg)

Career history
- 1955–1964: Edmonton Eskimos

Awards and highlights
- Grey Cup champion (1955, 1956)

Michael Volcan (September 17, 1932 – June 25, 2013) was a Canadian professional football player who played for the Edmonton Eskimos. He won the Grey Cup with the Eskimos in 1955 and 1956. Volcan was born and raised in Hamilton, Ontario and played football at the Hamilton Technical Institute and Kitchener-Waterloo Dutchmen. He won the Joe Clarke Memorial Trophy as the Eskimos MVP in 1962. He died in Edmonton in 2013.

== Personal life ==
Volcan and his wife Sylvia had three children together, Mickey, Michele, and Marty.
