= Veterinary corps =

Veterinary Corps may refer to:

- Australian Army Veterinary Corps, part of the Australian Army
- Royal Army Veterinary Corps, part of the British Army
- Royal Canadian Army Veterinary Corps, part of the Canadian Army
- Indian Army Remount and Veterinary Corps, part of the Indian Army
- Swedish Army Veterinary Corps, part of the Swedish Army
- United States Army Veterinary Corps, part of the Army Medical Department (United States)
