= Volkan =

Volkan is a Turkish masculine given name and a surname. Notable people with the name include:

== Given name ==
- Volkan Altın (born 1986), Turkish professional footballer
- Volkan Arslan, (born 1978), Turkish football player
- Volkan Babacan (born 1988), Turkish football player
- Volkan Bekçi (born 1987), Turkish footballer
- Volkan Kürşat Bekiroğlu (born 1977), Turkish footballer
- Volkan Canalioğlu (born 1950), Turkish politician
- Volkan Demirel (born 1981), Turkish footballer and coach
- Volkan Dikmen (born 1991), Turkish footballer
- Volkan Ş. Ediger (born 1953), scientist, writer, bureaucrat
- Volkan Güç (born 1980), Turkish volleyball player
- Volkan Gucer (born 1964), music composer, producer, performer of dilli kaval (Turkish wooden flutes)
- Volkan Kahraman (1979–2023), Austrian football player of Turkish descent
- Volkan Konak (1967–2025), Turkish folk singer
- Volkan Şen (born 1987), Turkish football player
- Volkan Ünlü (born 1983), Turkish football player
- Volkan Yaman (born 1982), German born Turkish football player

=== Middle name ===
- Hilmi Volkan Demir (born 1976), Turkish scientist

== Surname ==
- Vamık Volkan (born 1932), emeritus professor of psychiatry at the University of Virginia School of Medicine
