= Al-Burkan =

Libyan dissident group

Al-Burkan (The Volcano, alt. Al-Burkan al Watani) was a Libyan dissident terrorist group opposed to the rule of Muammar Gaddafi, that claimed responsibility for several political assassinations and attacks in Europe during the 1980's. A leader of Al-Burkan, Ragab Mabruk Zatout claimed to have personally met Oliver North and received support from US intelligence.

Al-Burkan claimed responsibility for the assassination of Ammar Daw al-Taqazi, Libya's ambassador to Italy, on 21 January 1984 in Rome. A Libyan businessman with close ties to Gaddafi was killed on June 21, 1984, in Athens during the visit of Ali Treki, Libya's secretary of foreign liaison.

Both Al-Burkan and the Iraqi Sadr Brigade took credit for the 11 September 1984 attack on two Libyan diplomats in Madrid, leaving two wounded. In 1985, Al-Burkan claimed responsibility for the assassination of the Libyan Information Bureau chief in Rome.

In 1996, the Dispatches program on BBC Channel 4 produced a documentary on the shooting murder of London police officer Yvonne Fletcher during the 17 April 1984 demonstration at the Libyan embassy. The program alleged that Al-Burkan had infiltrated the building and had shot Fletcher.
