= Volcano (brand) =

Polish clothing company

- Industry: Clothing retail
- Founded: 1992
- Headquarters: Bydgoszcz, Poland
- Area served: Europe, North America
- Key people: Beata Koselska (co-founder); Tomasz Koselski (co-founder)
- Products: Clothing
- Owner: VCO SA
- Website: volcano.pl

Volcano is a clothing brand, owned and distributed by the VCO joint-stock company. Its headquarters are located in Bydgoszcz, Poland. The brand specializes in the casual and sportswear.

== History ==
The company VCO, and its clothing brand, Volcano, were established in 1992 by married couple of Beata Koselska and Tomasz Koselski, in Bydgoszcz, Poland. Following the accession of Poland into the European Union, the brand begun expanding into foreign markets across Europe.

In 2019, the company had designed a combination of a sleeping bag and a jacket, aimed to help the homeless people in the cold temperature. The company distributes the jackets for free to the homeless people via charities, in the action titled "Ciepłe Serce" (from Polish: warm heart).

== Distribution and stores ==
In 2009, the company had 70 stores. As of 2022, its cloths were available in Canada, Belgium, Czechia, France, Germany, Israel, Greece, the Netherlands, Poland, Slovakia, Ukraine, and others. The brand is distributed by the parent company VCO, which also own brand Patrol. The brand also own its retail stores in Poland.
