= Vulcanoa =

Scientific classification
- Kingdom: Plantae
- Clade: Tracheophytes
- Clade: Angiosperms
- Clade: Eudicots
- Clade: Asterids
- Order: Gentianales
- Family: Apocynaceae
- Genus: Vulcanoa; Morillo
- Species: V. steyermarkii

Binomial name
- Vulcanoa steyermarkii (Woodson) Morillo

Synonyms
- Matelea steyermarkii Woodson

Monospecific genus of flowering plant

Vulcanoa is a monospecific genus of flowering plant in the dogbane family that contains only the species Vulcanoa steyermarkii. It is a liana native to Guatemala and the Mexican state of Chiapas.

== Description ==
Vulcanoa steyermarkii is a woody vine with trichomes that lack glands and face backwards. The leaves of the plant are placed opposite each other on the stems. The blades are a narrow oval shape which taper to a point, and are covered in rust-colored hairs. The flower clusters are cymes with few flowers, and the flowers have bell-shaped corollas and concave coronas that are covered in fine hairs. The fruits are spindle-shaped and shaggy with dense prickles.

== Taxonomy and etymology ==
The genus Vulcanoa was first described by Venezuelan botanist Gilberto Morillo in 2015. The name derives from the Greek fire god Vulcan, in reference to the habitat of Vulcanoa steyermarkii on volcanic mountains. It was created by splitting a single species, Matelea steyermarkii, from the genus Matelea. The new genus was then placed in the subtribe Gonolobinae.
