= Amboró National Park =

National park in Bolivia

- IUCN category II (national park)
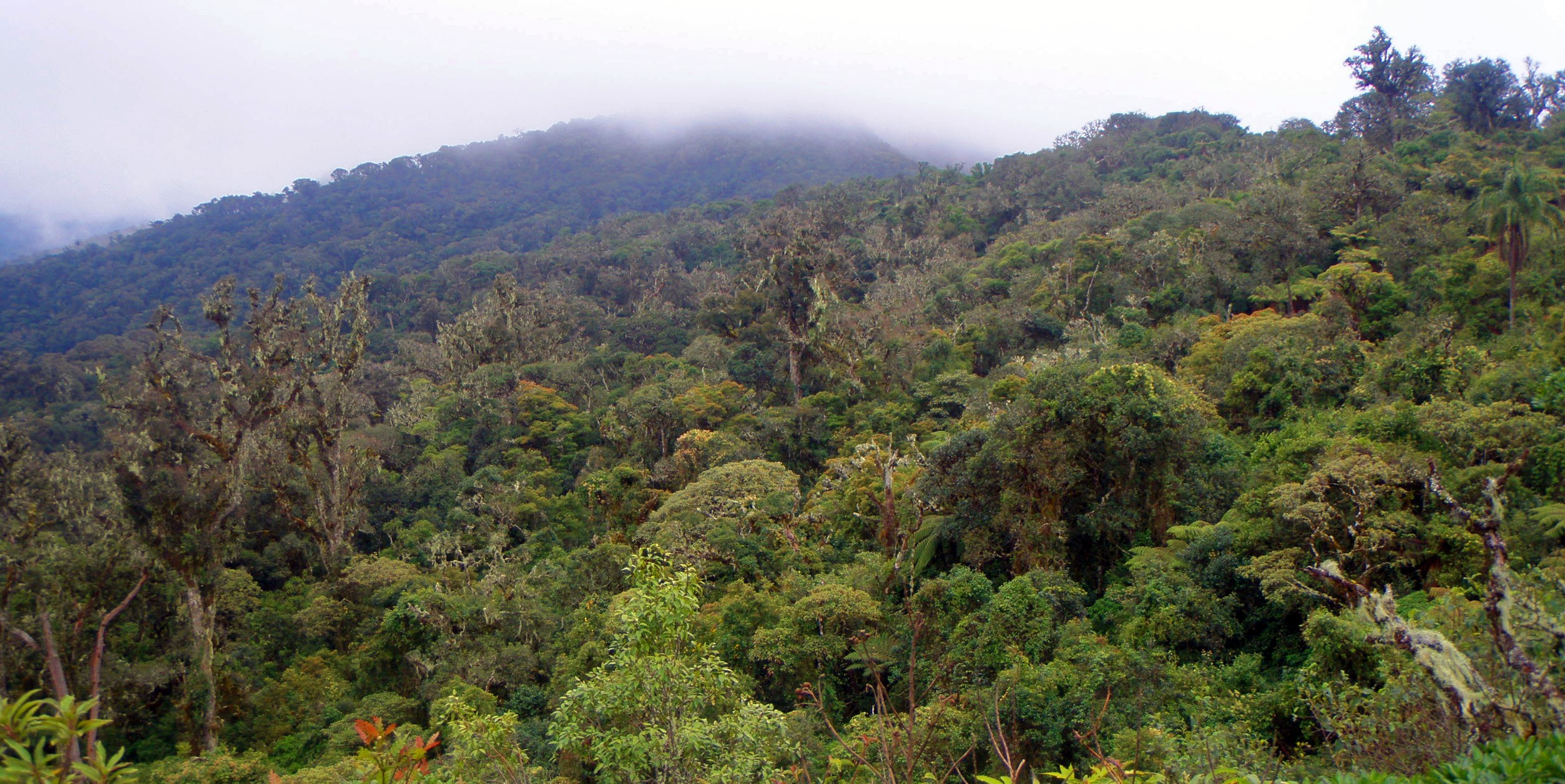

- Location within Bolivia
- Location: Bolivia
- Coordinates: 17°47′0″S 63°59′0″W
- Area: 4,425 km²
- Established: 1984
- Governing body: Servicio Nacional de Áreas Protegidas (SERNAP)

Amboró National Park in central Bolivia is a nature reserve with over 912 species of birds, over 177 mammalian species including puma, ocelot, and the rare spectacled bear. Covering an area of 4,425 km² (1,709 sq mi), it is protected from human settlements, hunting, mining and deforestation, though problems with all these still exist within the park. The Carrasco National Park is placed adjacent to Amboró, and together the two form a larger conservation unit.

== Description and geography ==
Amboró National Park is in the western part of Santa Cruz Department, at the "Elbow of the Andes", where the eastern cordillera bends slightly westward from its northern course. Amboró National Park lies within the Central Andes bioregion and protects parts of several distinct ecoregions: Southwest Amazon moist forests, Dry Chaco, Bolivian montane dry forests, Chiquitano dry forests, and Yungas at higher elevations.

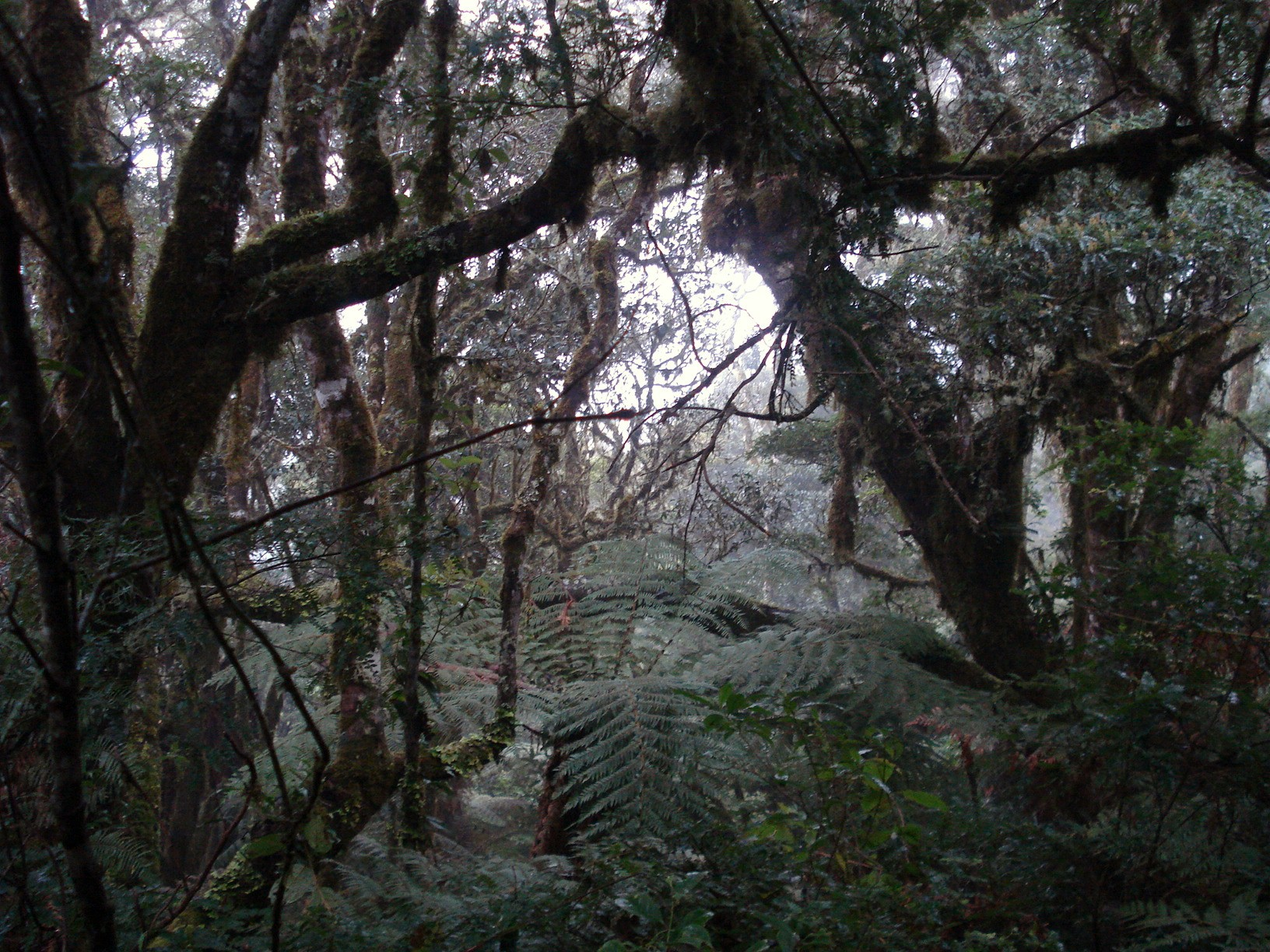
Cloud forests occur at higher elevations.

The peculiar features of the geography of the Amboró park area determine the biological makeup, with a great variety of flora and fauna. The altitude in the park ranges from 300 metres (980 ft) up to 3,338 metres (10,951 ft) in the westernmost part of the park in an area called "Siberia". Most of the park has elevations of between 1,000 metres (3,300 ft) and 2,000 metres (6,600 ft). Annual rainfall ranges between 1,400 millimetres (55 in) and 4,000 millimetres (160 in). Amboró National Park holds some fine expressions of Yungas forests.

== Access ==
The area is bordered to the north and south by two roads that connect the cities of Cochabamba and Santa Cruz. The southern road, built in the 1950s and once asphalted, was left decaying after the opening of the northern route in the 1980s. Today it has returned to gravel and dirt, limiting traffic and commercial exchange on south side of Amboró National Park.

Off of these two roads are a number of secondary gravel ones, allowing access to the more developed parts of the northern and southern Integrated Management Natural Areas or IMNAs. Small trails and river beds permit pedestrian access to the park, although this is limited by the rough topography. The principal access points to the northern zone are the towns of Buena Vista, Santa Fe, and Yapacani, along the northern Cochabamba-Santa Cruz road. Several dirt tracks lead off from there notably to Espejitos, Saguayó, La Chonta, Macuñucu and to the Yapacani river. In the southern zone, the principal access points are also secondary roads principally departing from the towns of El Torno, Samaipata, Mairana, Pampa Grande, Mataral, and Comarapa which are located on the main highway.

By law you have to have a guide to enter the park.

== Gallery ==
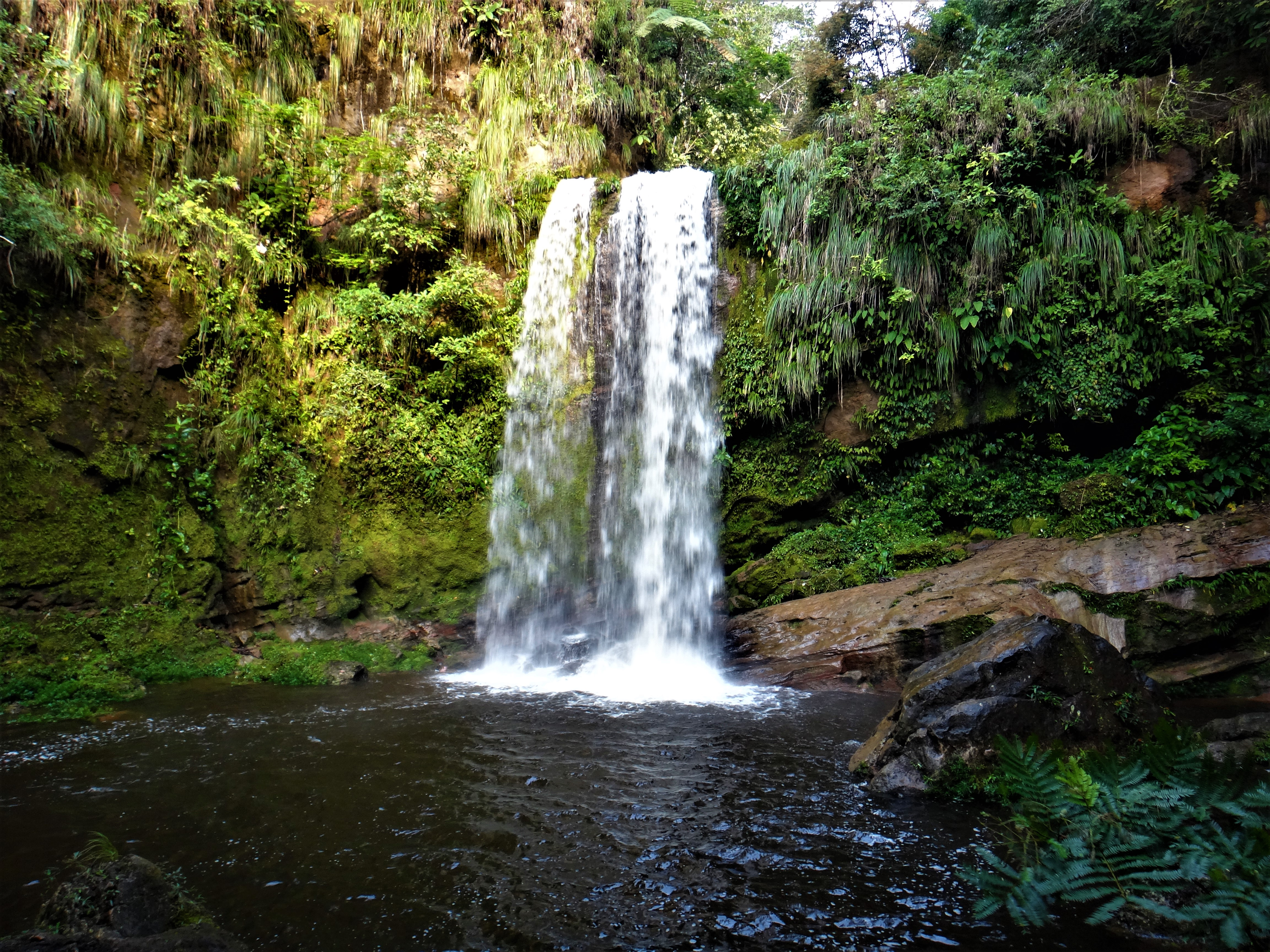

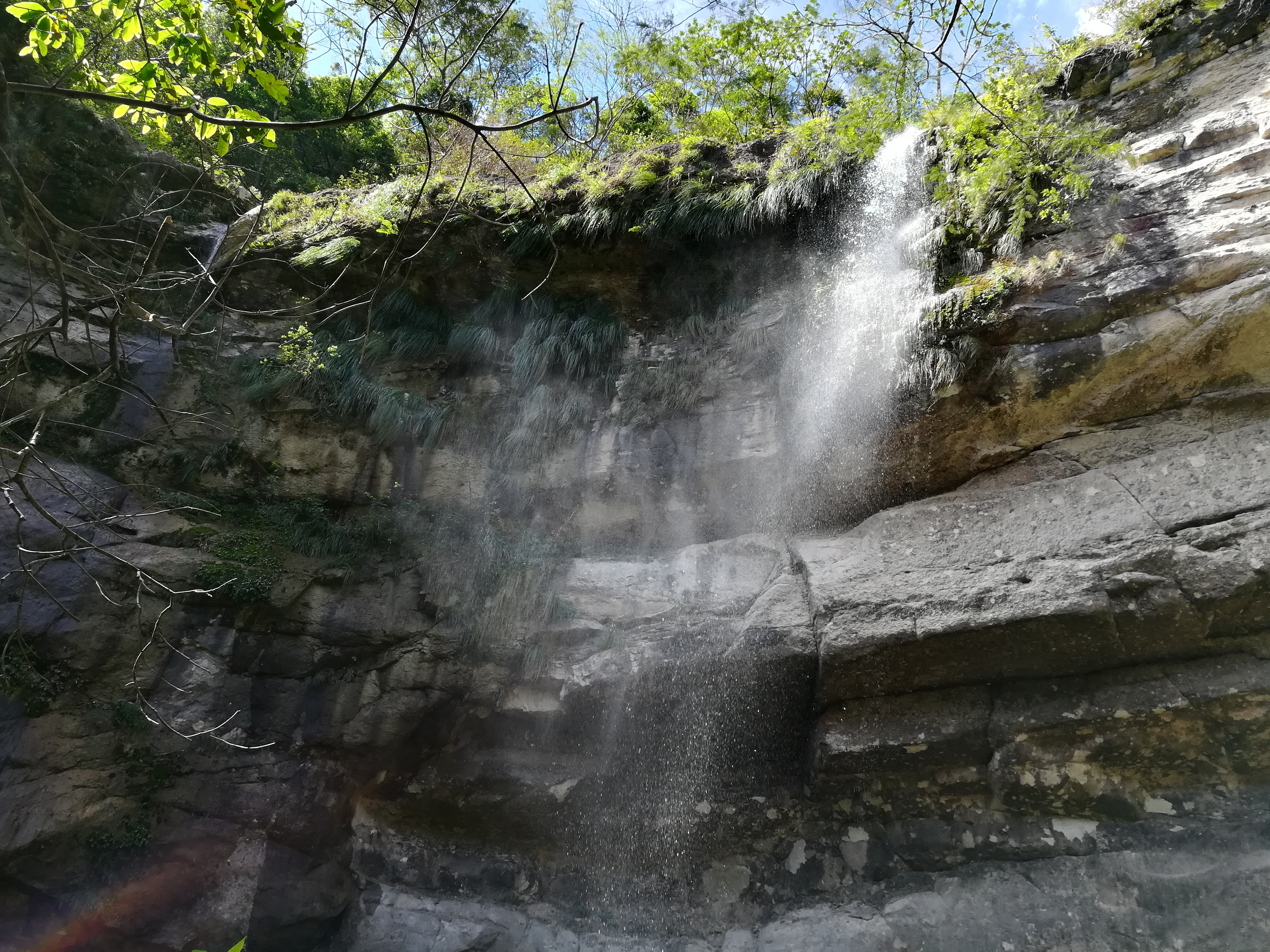

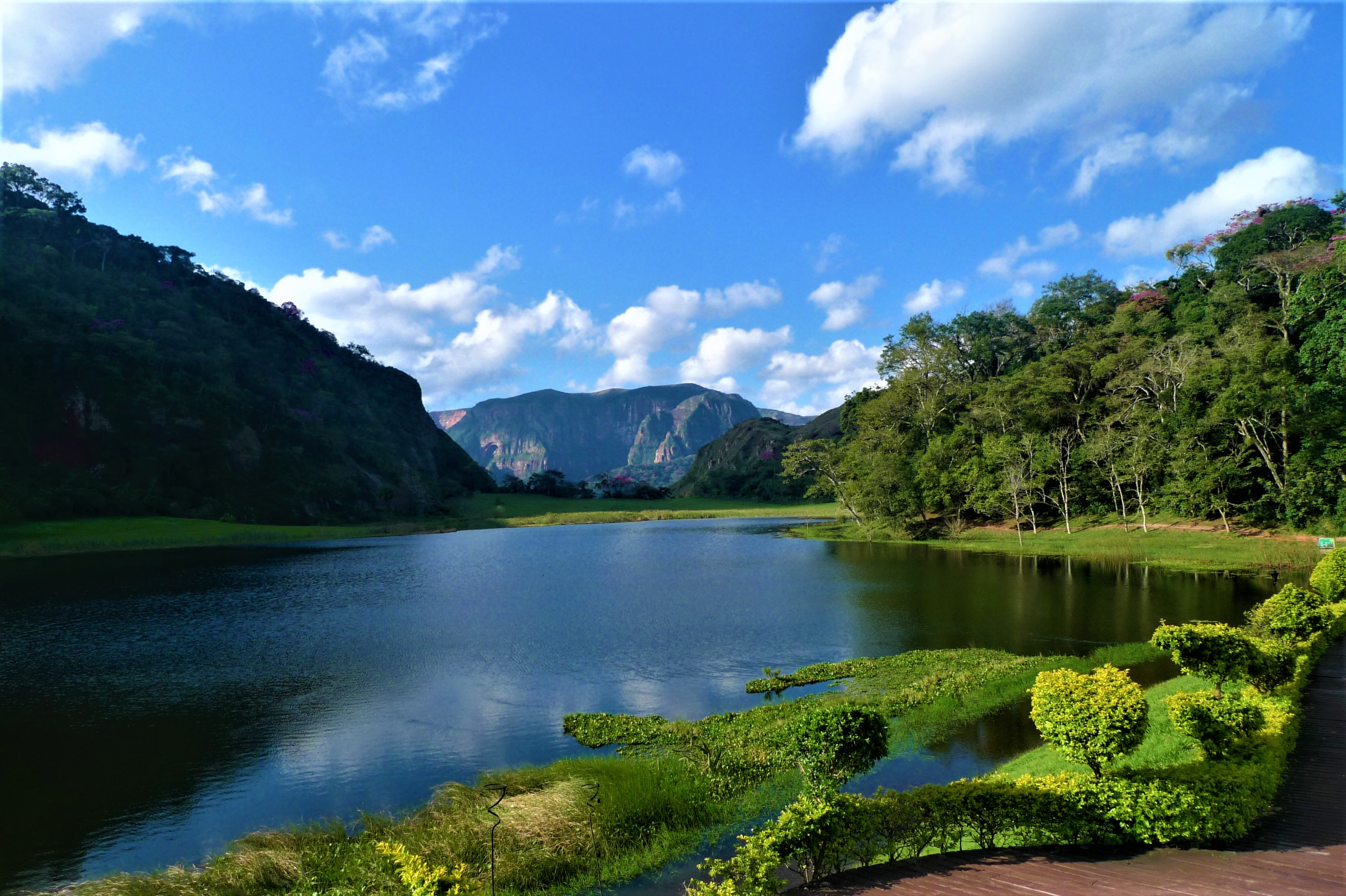
Serranías del Amboró Volcano Lagoon

== History ==
=== Creation ===
Initially created in 1973, the park was originally established as the Reserva de Vida Silvestre German Busch. In 1984, with the help of the native biologist Noel Kempff, British zoologist Robin Clark and others, the park became a national park protecting 1,800 km². In 1991, it expanded to 6,376 km^{2}.; however in 1995 it was reduced to 4,425 km².

=== Management ===
In 1989, from the town of Buena Vista and with a very limited budget, the Decentralized Unit of the Santa Cruz Forest Development Center took charge of the park's first management, consisting essentially in flora and fauna inventories, a census of the park's human population and a few information campaigns. This period saw the construction of the Mataracú, Saguayo, La Chonta, and Macuñucú ranger stations, administered by a liaison office, 10 park rangers, material and equipment. With support from TNC's Parks in Peril (PiP) program, the Fundación Amigos de la Naturaleza (FAN) took part in the management of the park's Southern Zone, with offices in Samaipata and Comarapa.

In 1991, with its first significant grant, FAN formed a management committee, with headquarters in Buena Vista, with the CDF being officially in charge of the area's management. That same year, the park size was extended to 637,000 ha without prior consultation of the local population and disregarding legitimate private property rights, a move which triggered serious protests and resistance against the park.

With funding from the Regional Alternative Development Program (Programa de Desarrollo Alternativo Regional - PDAR), a consensus was finally reached with the establishment of two different management categories, indicated on the ground by a so-called "Red Line", a narrow trail that marks the boundary between the National Park and the Integrated Management Natural Zone (IMNA), effectively a Multiple Use Zone.

In 1994, FAN was selected by the newly created Ministry of Sustainable Development and Environment to supervise the drafting of the area's management plan. The "Red Line" was officially approved in 1995, allotting 442,500 ha to the national park and 195,100 ha to the IMNA, divided in various patches. Local conflicts have since forced a constant redefinition of limits, so the exact boundaries between the two categories are not precisely known.

In 1995, the National Directorate for Biodiversity Conservation (Dirección Nacional de Conservación de la Biodiversidad - DNCB, today's SERNAP), the administration in charge of the country's protected areas decided to reclaim supervision of the area. Despite the signings of a contract between DNCB and FAN for the co-administration of the area, since this date the government has been solely in charge of the protected area.

== Flora ==
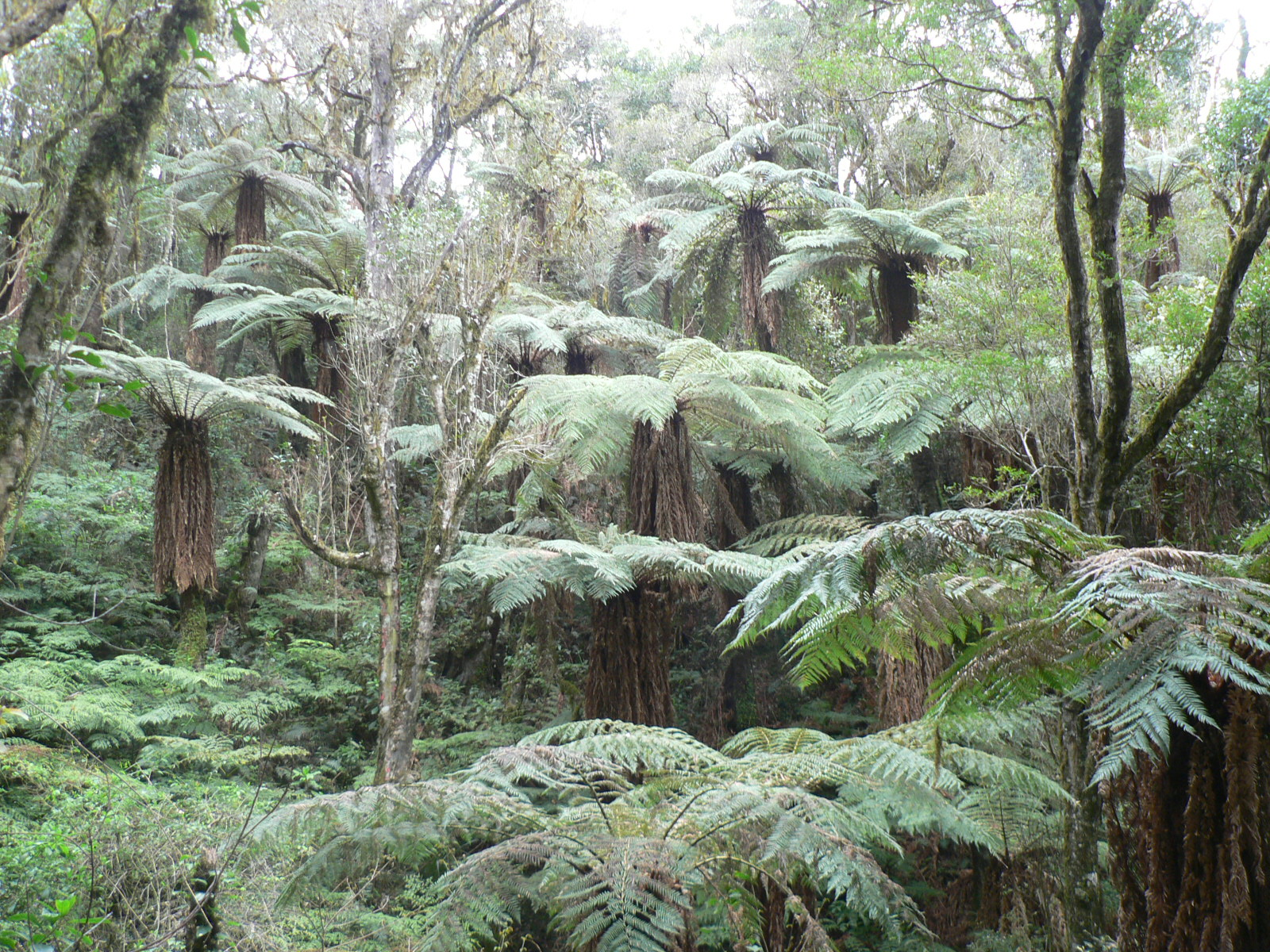
Amboro is noted for its many large ferns.

Parque Nacionál Amboró is one of the most botanically rich national parks in the world. The current number of documented plant species totals around 3,000, though this is almost certainly an underestimate. By comparison, the much more thoroughly documented and very biologically rich Hawaiian Island archipelago, which covers about six times the total area of Parque Nacional Amboró, has only about 2,800 native plant species, while the British Isles (covering about 65 times the area of Amboró) have only around 2,000. Even the entire California Floristic Province, one of the world's botanical biodiversity hotspots, contains only 8,000 plant species—about 2.5 times as many as Amboró—though it covers an area over 170 times larger. Much of the biodiversity of Amboró is partitioned according to the park's highly dissected topography and the widely varying climatic regimes that accompany the sharp transitions in elevation. Vegetational diversity is equally exceptional within the park, with lowland forests, montane forests, yungas and cloud forest, subpáramo, montane and non-montane scrublands, pampas, cactus forests, palm forests, forests composed almost entirely of treeferns, bromeliad-laden cliffs, epilithic subalpine plant communities, and others. The ecotones between these vegetation types are often sharply delineated according to aspect and elevation, yielding a highly heterogenous landscape that can make traveling in the park a dramatic and surprising experience.

Another factor contributing to the park's high plant species richness is its location at the confluence of several diverse and unique floristic regions: the tropical Amazon lowlands and pampas to the north and southeast, the subantarctic high Andes and altiplano to the west and southwest, the subtropical Tucumano-Boliviano forests to the south (these forests do not actually reach Amboró but many of their constituent species occur within the park), and the semiarid inter-Andean valleys and wet-tropical yungas forests that characterize the eastern slopes of the central Bolivian Andes. Due to the difficulty of the terrain and the almost complete lack of infrastructure throughout the park, much of it has never been botanically surveyed, and it is essentially beyond doubt that many more plant species await discovery within the park's more remote regions. The high rates of endemism throughout the tropical Andes (Amboró is no exception) suggest quite strongly that at least some of the undocumented plant species yet to be discovered within Amboró will almost certainly be Amboró endemics that are currently unknown to science.

Of the documented species, some of the most ecologically and economically interesting are bigleaf mahogany, mountain pine, black walnut (no relation to the eastern North American tree of the same name), limachu, q'illu q'illu (Berberis bumaelifolia, also spelled khellu khellu), cebillo, bibosi, ambaiba, pacay, and clavo rojo. In the cloud-enveloped forests there are extensive patches of giant tree ferns. In addition, there are pachiuva, açaí palms and many species of endemic orchids.

== Fauna ==
177 species of mammals have been registered; among them 43 species of bats. Among the large mammals we find the spectacled bear (locally known as the jucumari), the jaguar, and the giant anteater. The park presents a high level of endemism, including 173 species of amphibians with 50 species of toads alone, as well as 135 species of reptiles.

The number of bird species observed within the area exceeds 912, or more than 60% of the country's total. Two of the most interesting are arguably the southern helmeted curassow and the military macaw. Finally, 109 species of fish species have been identified by the IMNA alone, with a clear dependence on altitude. The largest specimens, which are the principal targets of commercial and subsistence fishing - such as sábalo, barred surubim, and pacú - are restricted to the alluvial plains, below 700 m. Above just 1000 m, the fish diversity diminishes dramatically.

== Human population ==
In the northern area, colonial settlements originated in the highlands. The region on the southern boundary is inhabited by peasants from the valleys of the department; while toward the east Guarayas communities are settled. Surrounding the area are colorful towns like: Samaipata, Comarapa and Buena Vista.
