= Vulcan (DC Comics) =

- Son of Vulcan #5, cover art by Ed McGuinness.

Publication information
- Publisher: DC Comics
- First appearance: Son of Vulcan vol. 2 #1 (August 2005)
- Created by: Scott Beatty (writer); Keron Grant (artist)

In-story information
- Alter ego: Miguel Devante
- Team affiliations: Derby Youth Home; Titans East
- Notable aliases: Son of Vulcan, Mikey
- Abilities: Pyrokinesis via the Vulcan Metavirus.

Vulcan is a fictional character that appears in comic books published by DC Comics. He is the second character to star in a book titled Son of Vulcan, the first being Johnny Mann, who was created by Charlton Comics in 1965 and later purchased by DC Comics in 1983.

In the modern version, Miguel Devante is known simply as Vulcan and first appears in Son of Vulcan vol. 2 #1 (August 2005). He was created by Scott Beatty and Keron Grant.

== Fictional character biography ==
Thousands of years prior, the White Martians created a metavirus, a metagene that could be transferred between individuals via touch. This metavirus gave the first Son of Vulcan their powers. Vulcan's family passed the metavirus down in an unbroken line, swearing to hunt and kill the White Martians.

Witchazel

Erich Thonius, the current Son of Vulcan, encounters orphan Miguel Devante after confronting Floronic Man, who has attacked a local Big Belly Burger. Miguel saves Vulcan from danger and is chosen to be his successor. Shortly afterward, Vulcan is killed by A'Morr, a White Martian posing as Floronic Man. Before dying, Vulcan passes the metavirus to Miguel. At Vulcan's funeral, his old enemies, the Coalition of Crime (Witchazel, Dino-Mite, Monkey-in-the-Middle, Charliehorse, Little B.U.D.D.Y., Flex, Scramjet, and Fishmonger) attack Miguel, who is helped by a previous Son of Vulcan named Barney Blaine.

The New Hybrids, artist Keron Grant.

Miguel is captured by a White Martian named A'monn A'mokk, but frees himself and destroys A'morr. The human-Martian hybrid children of A'monn and A'morr - Sapling, Buster, Silhouette, Quaker and Blur - escape.

Vulcan appears in JSA Classified #19 (2007) as an unwilling participant in Roulette's metahuman brawls. He joins Titans East before being injured and rendered comatose in a battle with Trigon.

Vulcan is seen pursuing El Diablo in the pages of Suicide Squad as the latter escapes in a commandeered ambulance to Gotham before his Justi-Flyer is disabled by Deadshot.

== Powers, abilities, and equipment ==
Thanks to the unique Vulcan Metavirus, Miguel can generate intense heat from any part of his body. Miguel wears a special suit of body armor created by previous Vulcans, with gauntlets capable of generating forcefields. All Vulcans carry a special sword with a monomolecular blade.

The Vulcans have access to the Encyclopedae Vulcanis, containing the collective knowledge of previous mantle holders.
