= Vulkan (disambiguation) =

Vulkan is a cross-platform 3D graphics and computing API.

Vulkan may also refer to:

== Military and shipbuilding ==
- Bremer Vulkan, a former shipbuilding company on the river Weser, Bremen-Vegesack, Germany
- M61 Vulcan, a Gatling-style rotary cannon
- P-1000 Vulkan, an anti-ship missile
- R-25 Vulkan, a Yugoslav surface-to-air missile project
- SMS Vulcano, 1843 Austro-Hungarian Navy paddle steamer renamed Vulkan
- SMS Vulkan, a 1908 German U-boat salvage tug
- Vulkan, a variant of the Russian Energia launch vehicle
- Vulkan files leak, a 2021 document leak implicating the Russian company NTC Vulkan in acts of cybercrime

== Other uses ==
- Vulkán, the Hungarian name for the city of Vulcan, Hunedoara, Romania
- FK Vulkan, a Macedonian football club

== See also ==
- Vulcan (disambiguation)
- Volcan (disambiguation)
- Volcano, a rupture on the crust of a planetary-mass object
- Vulkano
