= Terena =

Terena may refer to:

- Terena people, an ethnic group in Brazil
- Terêna language, their language
- TERENA, Trans-European Research and Education Networking Association
- Terena (São Pedro), parish within the municipality Alandroal, Portugal
