= Samaipata =

Samaipata may refer to:

- Samaipata, Bolivia
- El Fuerte de Samaipata
