= Chané =

Indigenous people of South America

Chané (Izoceño)

Total population
- 1,500

Regions with significant populations
- Argentina 3,034 (2010); Bolivia; Paraguay

Languages
- Chiriguano, Spanish, formerly Chané dialect of Terêna

Religion
- Animism, Christianity (Roman Catholicism, Anglicanism)

Chané is the collective name for the southernmost Arawakan-speaking peoples. They lived in the plains of the northern Gran Chaco and in the foothills of the Andes in Paraguay, Brazil, Bolivia, and Argentina. The historical Chané are divided into two principal groups: the Chané proper who lived in eastern Bolivia, and the Guaná who lived in Paraguay and adjacent Brazil. Twenty-first century survivors of the Chané are the Izoceño people of Bolivia and 3,034 descendants reported in Argentina by the 2010 census. Survivors of the Guaná are the Tereno and the Kinikinao both of Mato Grosso do Sul province in Brazil.

Most of the historical Chané were subjects of and absorbed by the Eastern Bolivian Guarani, commonly called Chiriguanos, while the Guaná were subjects of the Mbayá, a Guaycuruan speaking people.

== History ==
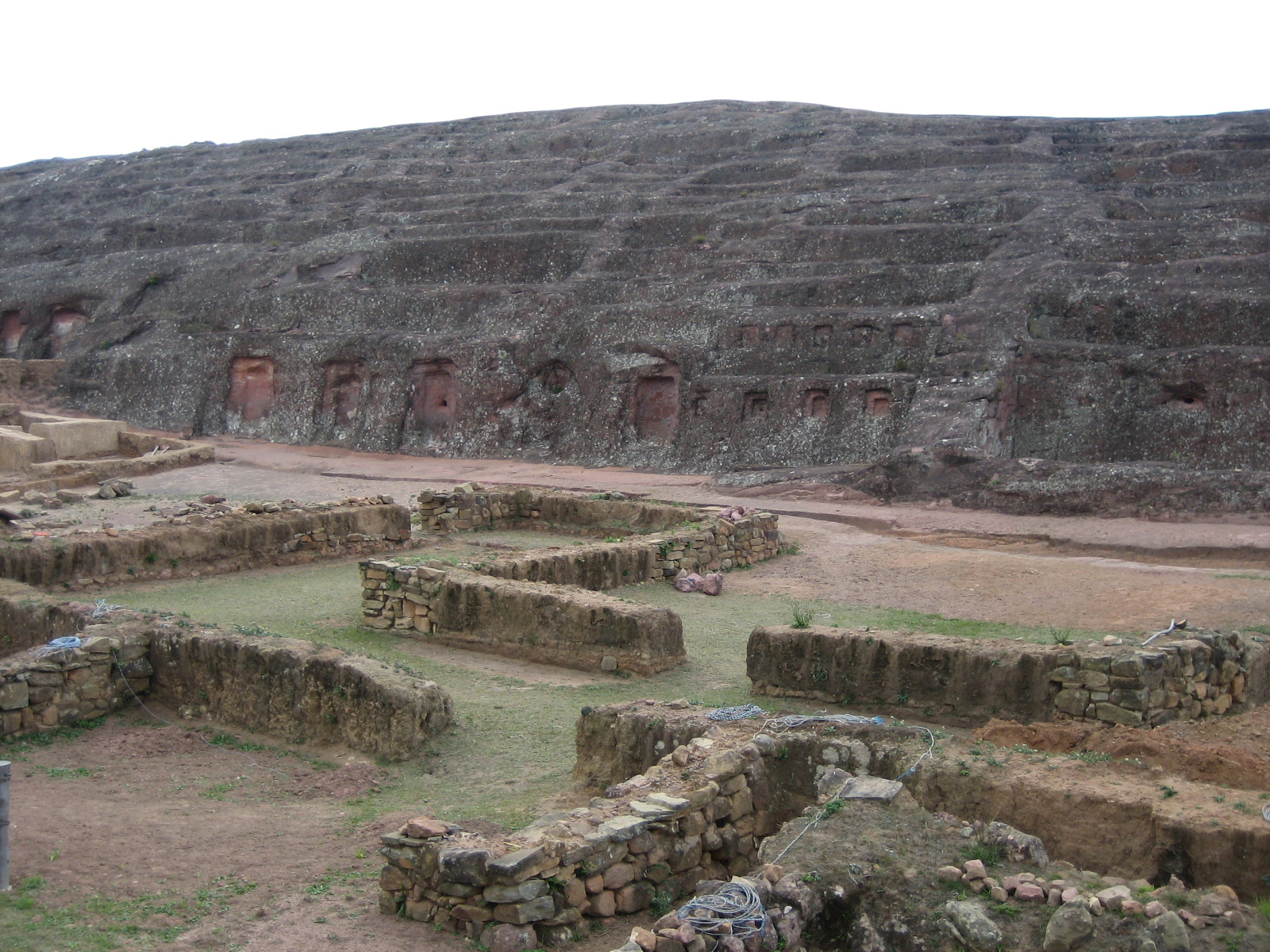
El Fuerte de Samaipata, Chané ruins that predate the Inca, Samaipata, Bolivia

The Chané, together with other Arawak groups, are believed to have originated in northeastern South America, but to have spread southward about 2,500 years ago. They developed an agrarian culture, built densely populated villages, cultivated corn, peanuts, cotton and squash, and are famous for their ceramics and graphics which have been found mainly in the pampas of Bolivia surrounding the city of Santa Cruz de la Sierra and in Samaipata, Portachuelo, Valle Abajo, Okinawa, Cotoca, El Pari, Mataral and Warnes. They also craft wooden masks and fabric clothing.

An ancient Chané religious site dating from about 300 CE is El Fuerte de Samaipata, now a UNESCO World Heritage Site.

They were a rather peaceful culture and traded with the Quechua-speaking Incas in the Andes and with other Arawak-speaking groups to the north and east. Chanés and Incas established a truce to join forces against the Eastern Guarani peoples of the Andes foothills, who the Incas and Spaniards called Chiriguanos. The Chiriguanos raided the Chané homeland on a regular basis, and prior to the Spanish conquest, the Chiriguanos defeated the Chanés and halted the Inca advance into the plains and valleys of what is now the Santa Cruz Department of Bolivia. Some Chane were forced into slavery by the Chiriguanos, others migrated to less fertile regions to the southeast. Many Chané women were taken as wives by Chiriguano men, thus starting a process of assimilation. Both Guaraní and Guaraní-speaking Chané also assimilated and mixed with Europeans during the colonial period and after the independence of both Argentina and Bolivia.

== The Guaná ==
The Guaná, (also called Layaná) are the eastern branch of the Chané. They were vassals of the Mbayá, a relationship that, according to Spanish accounts, existed in 1548, and possibly much earlier. The Guaná were agricultural and pedestrian as opposed to the nomadic Mbayá who became equestrians by the early 17th century. In the early 18th century the Guaná lived in seven large villages of 1,000 or more people on the western side of the Paraguay River between 19 and 22 south latitudes. Later in the 18th century, some of them migrated along with the Mbayá east of the Paraguay River. They were estimated, perhaps generously, in the early 18th century to have numbered 18,000 to 30,000. In 1793 they numbered about 8,200.

The Guaná provided Mbayá chiefs with labor, agricultural products, textiles, and wives and in exchange were given protection and European goods such as iron tools by the Mbayá. The cultures of the Guaná and Mbayá slowly became more similar as the Mbayá adopted agriculture and weaving and the Guaná became equestrian. The Mbayá augmented their numbers, strictly limited by late marriages and abortion, by intermarriage with Guaná and captive women of other ethnic groups. Spanish chroniclers describe the Guaná as docile. The Mbayá, arrogant and ethnocentric, were described by Spanish chroniclers as surprisingly benign and respectful in dealing with their Guaná subjects.

By 1850 the Guaná had broken their relationship with the Mbayá and were living in the area of Miranda, Mato Grosso do Sul, Brazil. The largest sub-tribe of the Guaná was the Tereno who numbered 3 to 4 thousand at the time. In 2001, they were called the Terêna, and 16,000 if them were living in the same area.

== Distribution ==
There are some Chané communities still living in the Izozog region in Santa Cruz, Bolivia, and in Yacui and Che-Renda near Tartagal, Argentina. In both cases, they have been influenced by the Guaraní language and culture, but still retain their Chane identity. The other descendants of the Chane culture were first mixed with the Guaranis, later with the Spaniards, and in the last two centuries with migration flows of other Europeans, Arabs, and migrants from other parts of Bolivia and Argentina. The Chane culture is an important heritage component of the populations of Santa Cruz, the Paraguayan Chaco, Salta Province, Jujuy Province and the Argentine Chaco.

== See also ==
- Arawak
- Chané language
- Maipurean languages
