= Chané dialect =

Extinct dialect of Argentina and Bolivia

Chané
- Native to: Argentina
- Ethnicity: Chané people
- Extinct: after 1908
- Language family: Arawakan: Southern; Bolivia–Parana; Terena; Chané

Language codes
- ISO 639-3: caj
- Glottolog: chan1322

Chané is an extinct language of Argentina and Bolivia. It was either a dialect of, or closely related to, the Terena language of the Arawakan language family. There is little data on this language. In Argentina, it was spoken in Salta province.
