= Terena Sign Language =

Village sign language used in southern Brazil

- Native to: Brazil
- Region: Cachoeirinha and neighboring areas near Miranda, Mato Grosso do Sul
- Ethnicity: Terena
- Language family: village sign

Language codes
- ISO 639-3: None (mis)
- Glottolog: tere1282

Terena Sign Language is a village sign language used by deaf Terena people in southern Brazil. Deaf Terena who attend school use LIBRAS there, but switch to Terena Sign when they return home.

== See also ==
- Terena language
