= Samaipata, Bolivia =

Town and adjacent archaeological site in Bolivia

Samaipata Samaypata
- Town
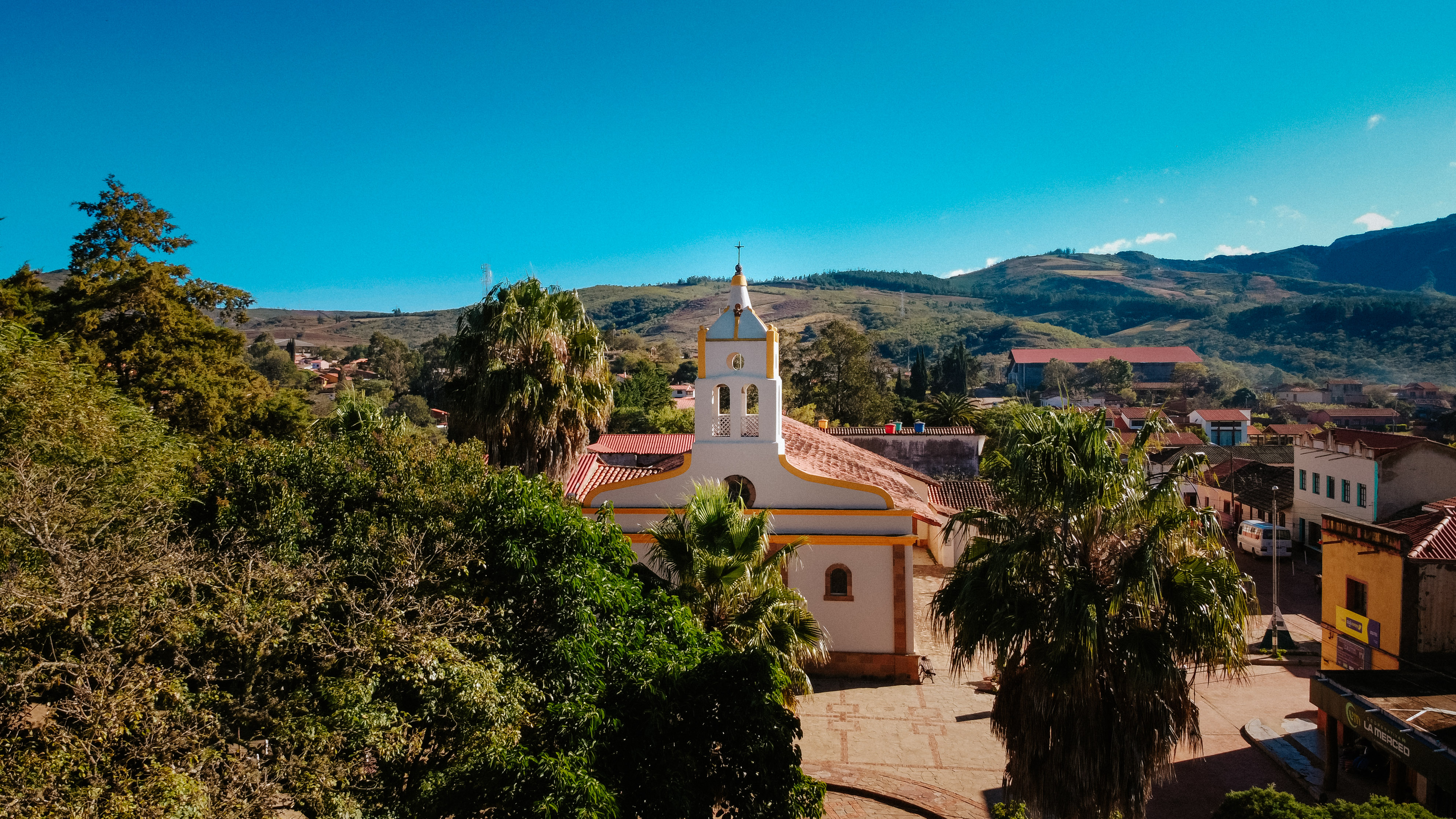
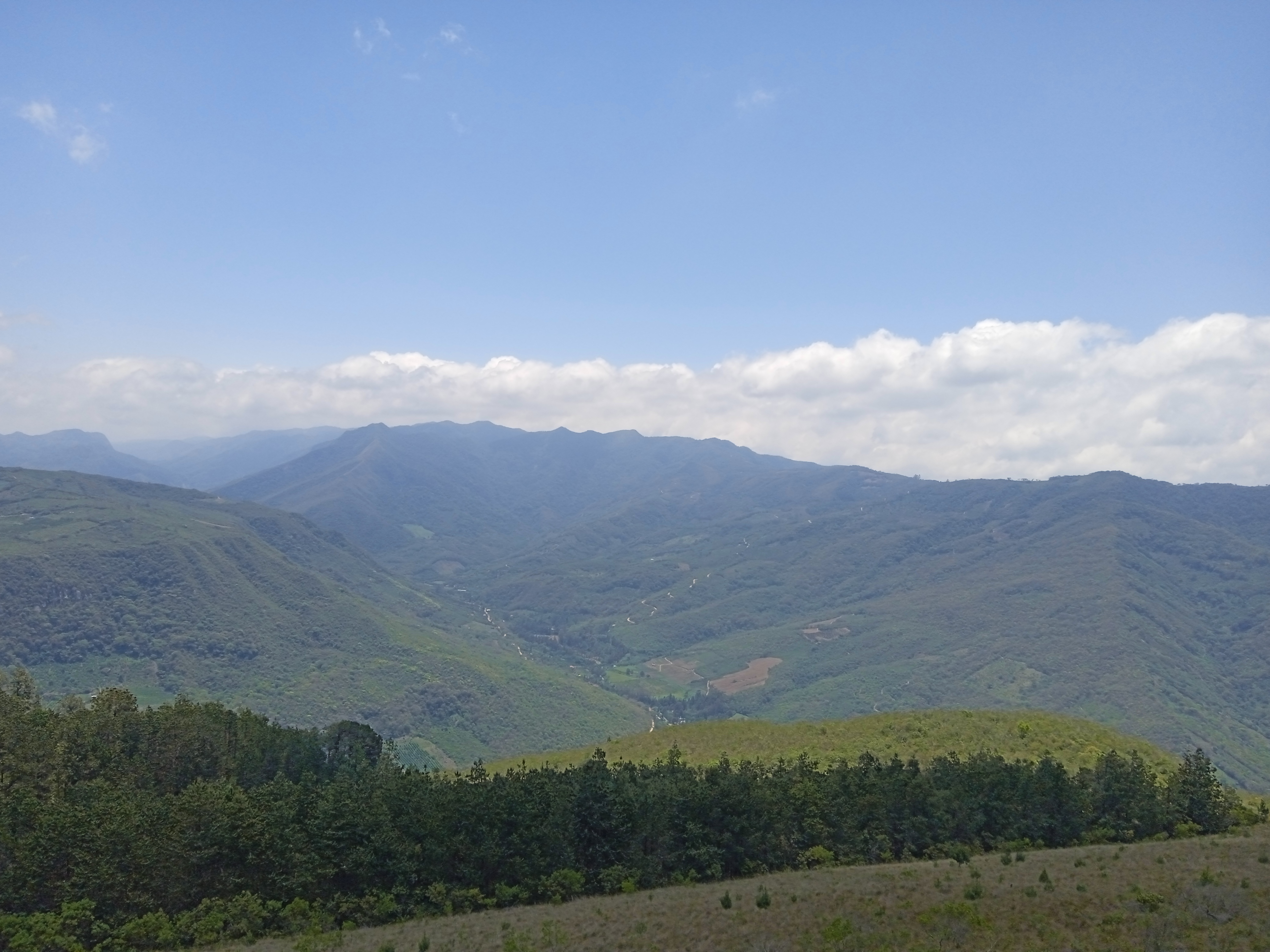
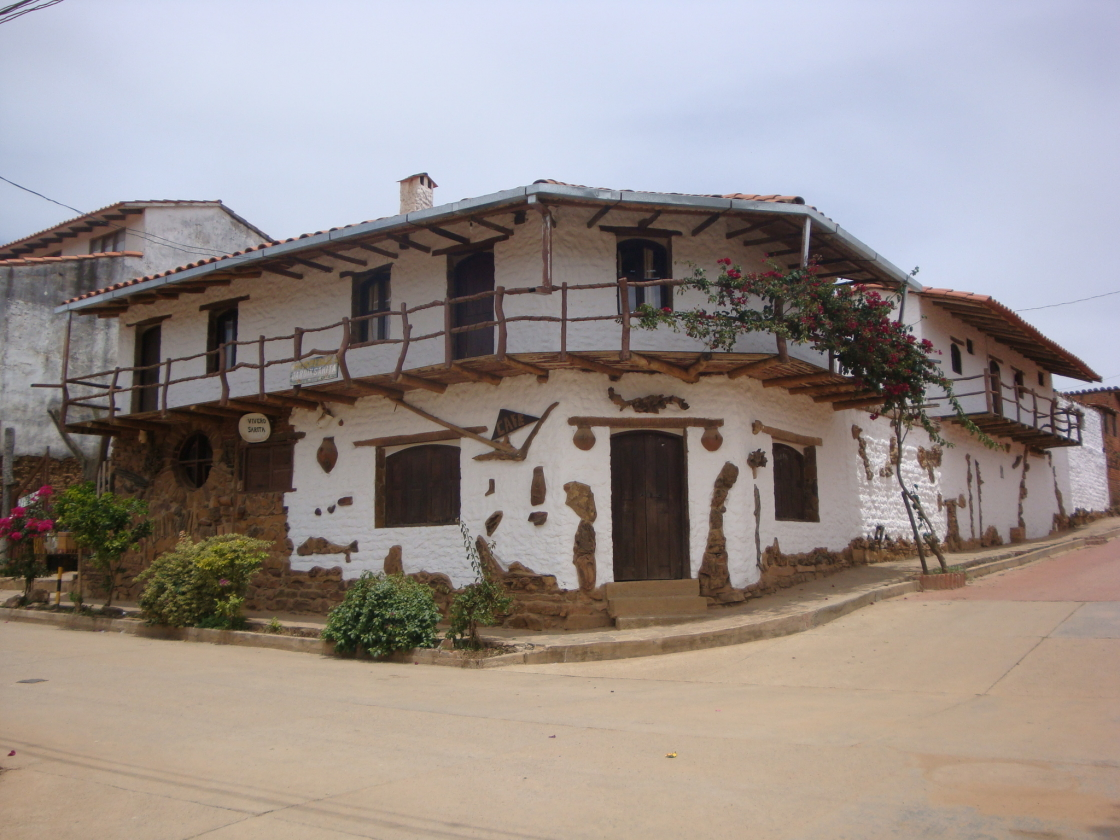
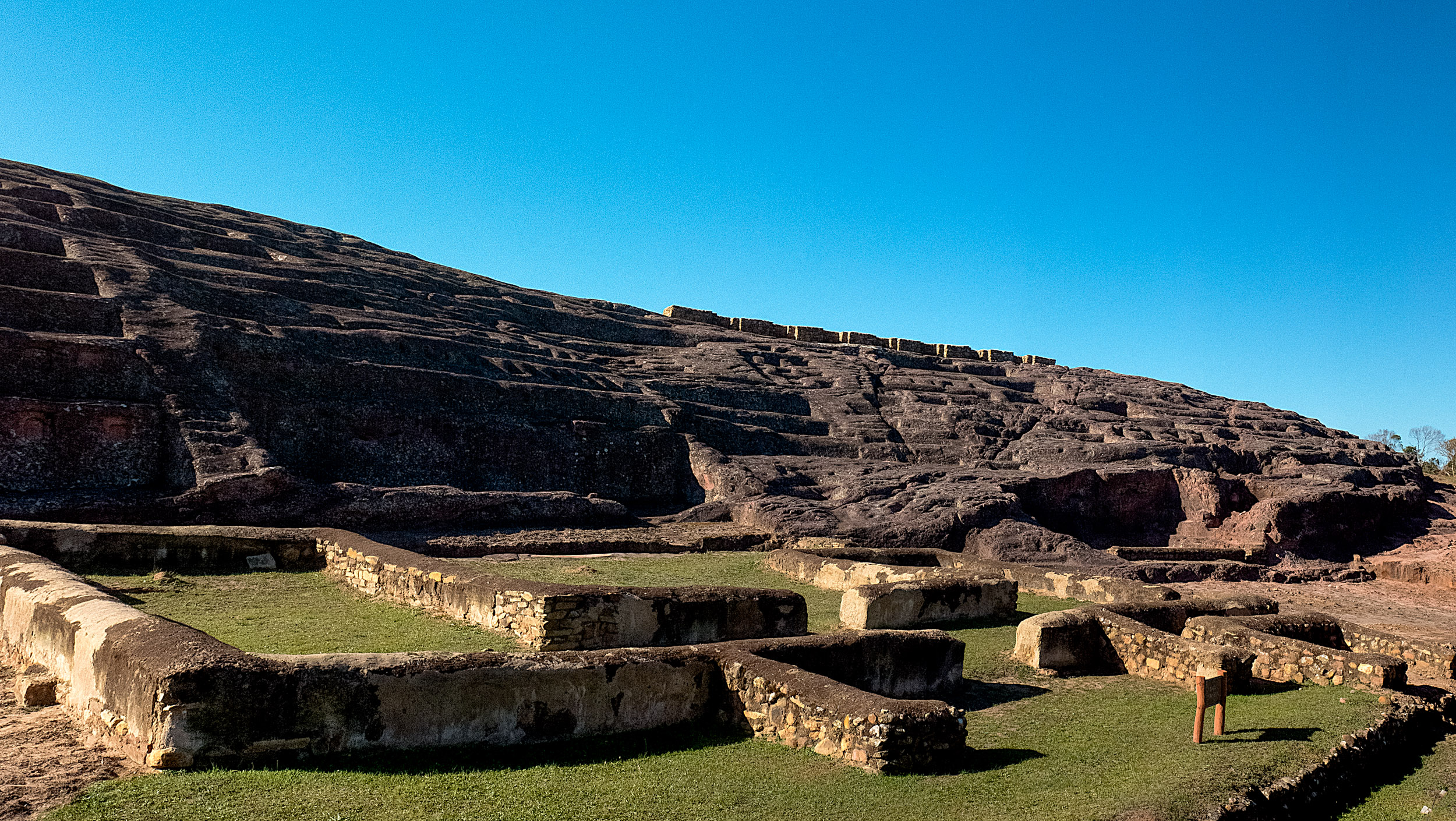
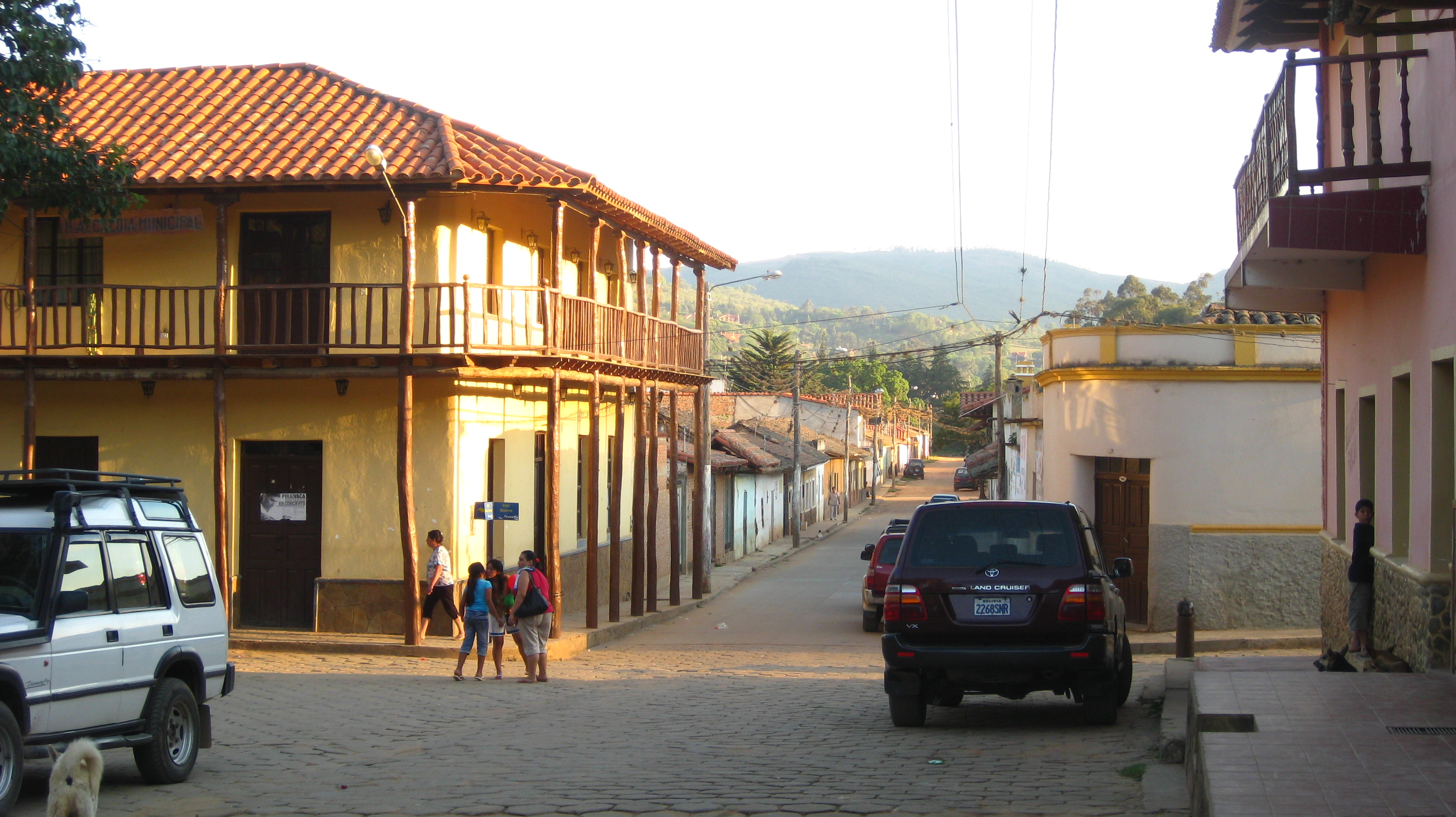
- Samaipata

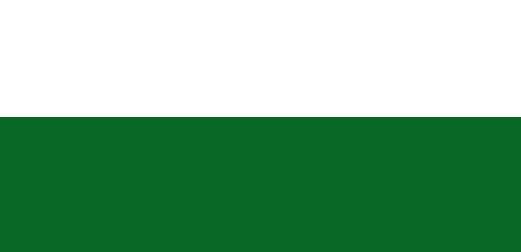
- Flag Seal

- Location in Bolivia
- Coordinates: 18°10′46″S 63°52′32″W
- Country: Bolivia
- Department: Santa Cruz Department
- Province: Florida Province
- Municipality: Samaipata Municipality

Population (2012)
  - Total: 4,398
- Time zone: UTC-4 (BOT)

Samaipata or Samaypata (Quechua samay to rest, pata elevated place / above, at the top / edge, bank (of a river), shore) is a small town in the Florida Province of the Santa Cruz Department in Bolivia. It has a subtropical climate and an altitude of 1600–1800 m. It lies about 120 kilometers to the southwest of the city of Santa Cruz de la Sierra in the foothills of the Andes on the way to Sucre. It is a popular resort for the inhabitants of Santa Cruz due to its cool climate. As such, there is a regular bus and taxi service to Santa Cruz. The town is small, with numerous vibrant colonial buildings and narrow cobbled streets. It is located close to several tourist attractions such as El Fuerte de Samaipata, the Amboro National Park, El Codo de los Andes, Cuevas waterfalls, vineyards, rapids and lagoons, as well as well-preserved colonial towns such as Vallegrande, Pampagrande, Postrervalle, Santiago del Valle, Pucará, and others. It is also the first stop in the several tourist trails to Sucre, Potosi, and the Che Guevara route.

== Geography ==
Samaipata is a UNESCO World Heritage Site. It is located in the province of Florida in the Santa Cruz department of Bolivia. It is located in a region of foothills going across the middle of the country, dividing the desert landscape of the west from the jungle landscape of the east. The nearest city is Santa Cruz de La Sierra, the largest city in Bolivia.

== History ==
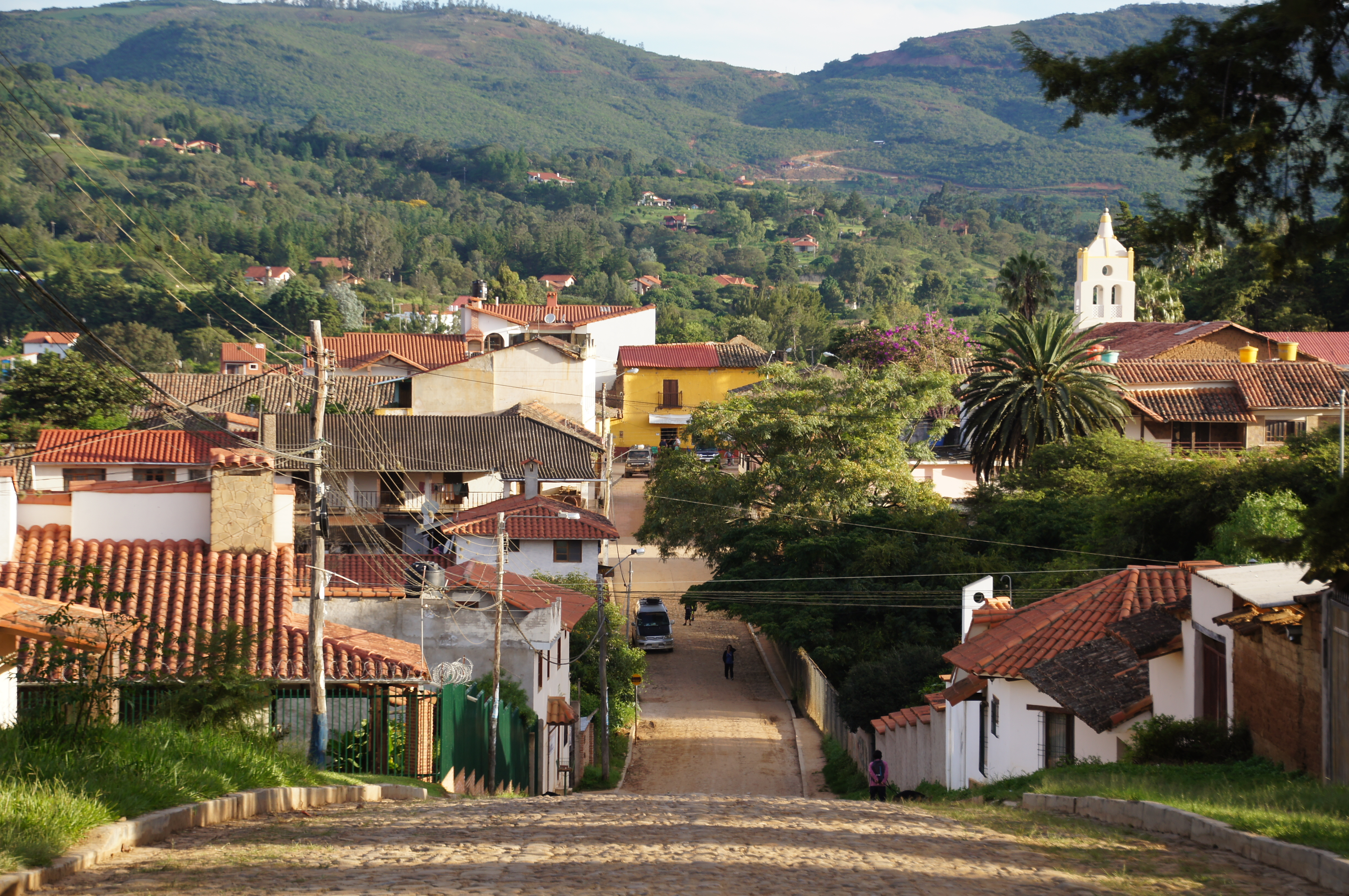
Downtown, Samaipata, Bolivia in the early morning light.

The valley was originally populated by people of the Chane culture dedicated to agriculture, hunting and gathering. The Chanes are famous for their densely populated villages, their ceramics and graphic designs, and most importantly the construction of the temple at El Fuerte de Samaipata. They cultivated mainly corn and peanuts and were rather peaceful. There are several Chane burial sites all through the valleys and pampas of Santa Cruz between the Siberia mountain ridge and the Guapay River.

The region was later conquered by the Incas as they expanded to the southeast from their native Peru. The Incas reached a pact with the Chanes and built a city at El Fuerte de Samaipata.

In the 16th century, Guarani warrior tribes, called Chiriguanos by the Incas and Spanish, invaded the valley from the south and defeated both the Incas and Chanes. The Guaranis continued raiding the valley and the region until the 19th century.

In 1618, Pedro de Escalante y Mendoza founded Samaipata, as a point of contact between Santa Cruz and Vallegrande. The town moved from its original location in a place known as Castilla to its current location a few kilometers west.

== People ==
Samaipata is quite cosmopolitan and diverse. Samaipateños from old families are descendants of Spanish colonists from Vallegrande and Santa Cruz (many of whom were of Sephardic origin) and the local Guarani natives that had invaded the valley prior to the arrival of the Spaniards. Beginning in the 1880s, some Arab families settled in Samaipata, they were followed by a few Croatians and Italians, all of which mixed and assimilated into the local population.

After the road that passes by the town was paved in the 1960s, many migrants from all over Bolivia (mainly from nearby Santa Cruz, but also Cochabamba and Sucre) settled in this little town. Since the 1970s, several Germans, Dutch, French, Argentines and a few Japanese also moved to Samaipata and made it their home.

== Economy ==
The local economy is mainly dedicated to tourism, agriculture (including its many vineyards) and crafts. Local farmers produce organic vegetables such as tomatoes, artichokes, lettuces and green beans. The region is also famous for its production of fruits such as peaches, grapes, plums, chirimoyas, guapurus, strawberries and figs. There is also a significant production of wines, singani, honey, marmalades, cold cuts, herbal infusions, lavender, art pieces and artisan crafts.

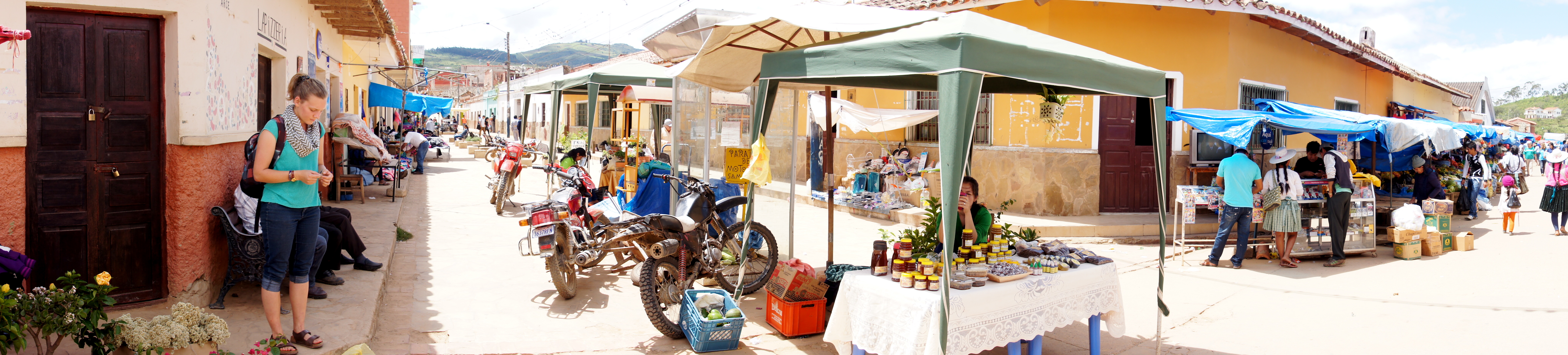
The indoor market spills out onto the streets in Samaipata, Bolivia.

== Climate ==
Samaipata's climate is classified as a subtropical highland climate, abbreviated "Cfb" by the Köppen climate classification system and "Cfbl" by the Trewartha climate classification system. The climate is temperate, semi-dry in the winter months, and mild with an average annual temperature of 19.9 °C. During the winter months cold fronts called Surazos come from the Argentine Pampas and enter the plains and valleys of Santa Cruz, these cold winds combined with the altitude can reach temperatures below freezing. In the summer, the days are warm and the nights cool. Frost occurs on nine days in an average year, mostly in the winter months.

Climate data for Samaipata, Bolivia. 18 11 S, 63 53 W. Elevation: 1,647 metres (5,404 ft)
Month	Jan	Feb	Mar	Apr	May	Jun	Jul	Aug	Sep	Oct	Nov	Dec	Year
Daily mean °C (°F)	21.7 (71.1)	21.4 (70.5)	21.2 (70.2)	19.8 (67.6)	18.3 (64.9)	17.4 (63.3)	16.7 (62.1)	18.1 (64.6)	19.8 (67.6)	21.0 (69.8)	21.5 (70.7)	21.7 (71.1)	19.9 (67.8)
Average precipitation mm (inches)	121.3 (4.78)	125.7 (4.95)	95.3 (3.75)	48.2 (1.90)	27.3 (1.07)	28.6 (1.13)	13.5 (0.53)	35.4 (1.39)	32.5 (1.28)	44.5 (1.75)	78.8 (3.10)	117.5 (4.63)	768.6 (30.26)
Source: Weatherbase: Samaipata, Bolivia.

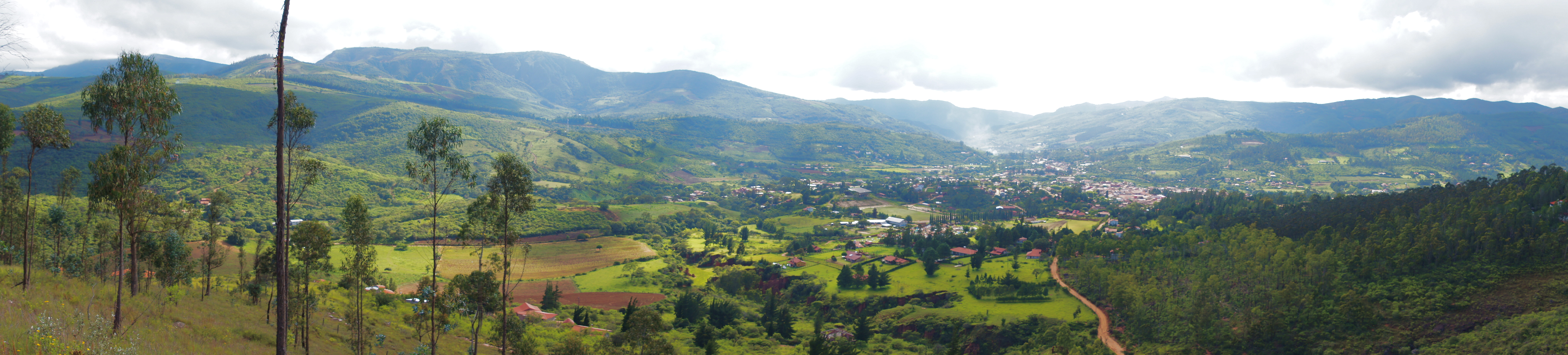
A view from the mountain in El Sauce overlooking Samaipata, Bolivia.

== Viniculture ==
Samaipata has a wine culture dating back to the first Spanish settlements in the Valleys of Santa Cruz. Although it had a dwindling production during the Republican Era, in recent years it has established itself as one of the most prominent wine regions in Bolivia. It is now the second wine region in terms of planted area and attracts an increasing number of ecotourists, particularly from Santa Cruz, Bolivia's largest city.

There are three established wineries in the region: Uvairenda (where the 1750 Wines are produced), Bodegas Landsua, and El Último Vargas. Located at 1.750 m.a.s.l., Samaipata has arisen as its main representative for its high-quality wines and its success in the Bolivian market.

Known for its views and stable weather, Samaipata proves to be a good place for viniculture. Seasonal and day/night temperature variation together with protection from the cold winds from the South, provided by the hills that surrounds the numerous valleys, Samaipata and the rest of the Valleys of Santa Cruz have become areas of increased interest for its vinicultural potential.

The main varieties produced are Tannat, Cabernet Sauvignon, Syrah, Barbera, Malbec, Torrontés grapes becoming the emblematic grapes of the region. Other varieties cultivated, although in a lesser quantity, are Cabernet Franc, Malbec, Sauvignon Blanc and Riesling.

Many of the vineyards of Samaipata are within walking distance from the town center. Most vineyards provide guided tours which include a wine tasting at the end of the tour.

== Gallery ==
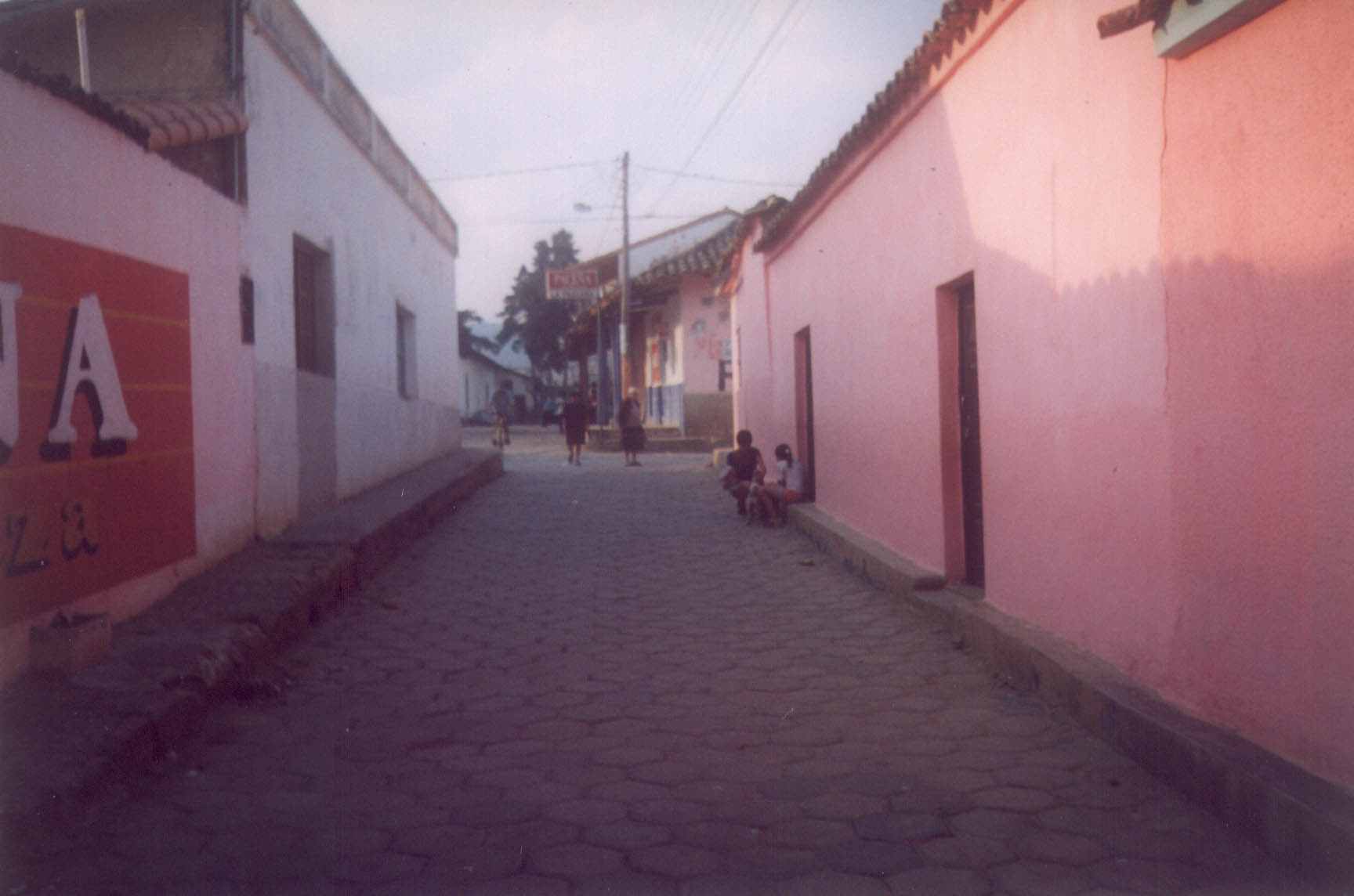
Streetscene. Traditional Spanish colonial houses face into a courtyard/garden for security reasons.

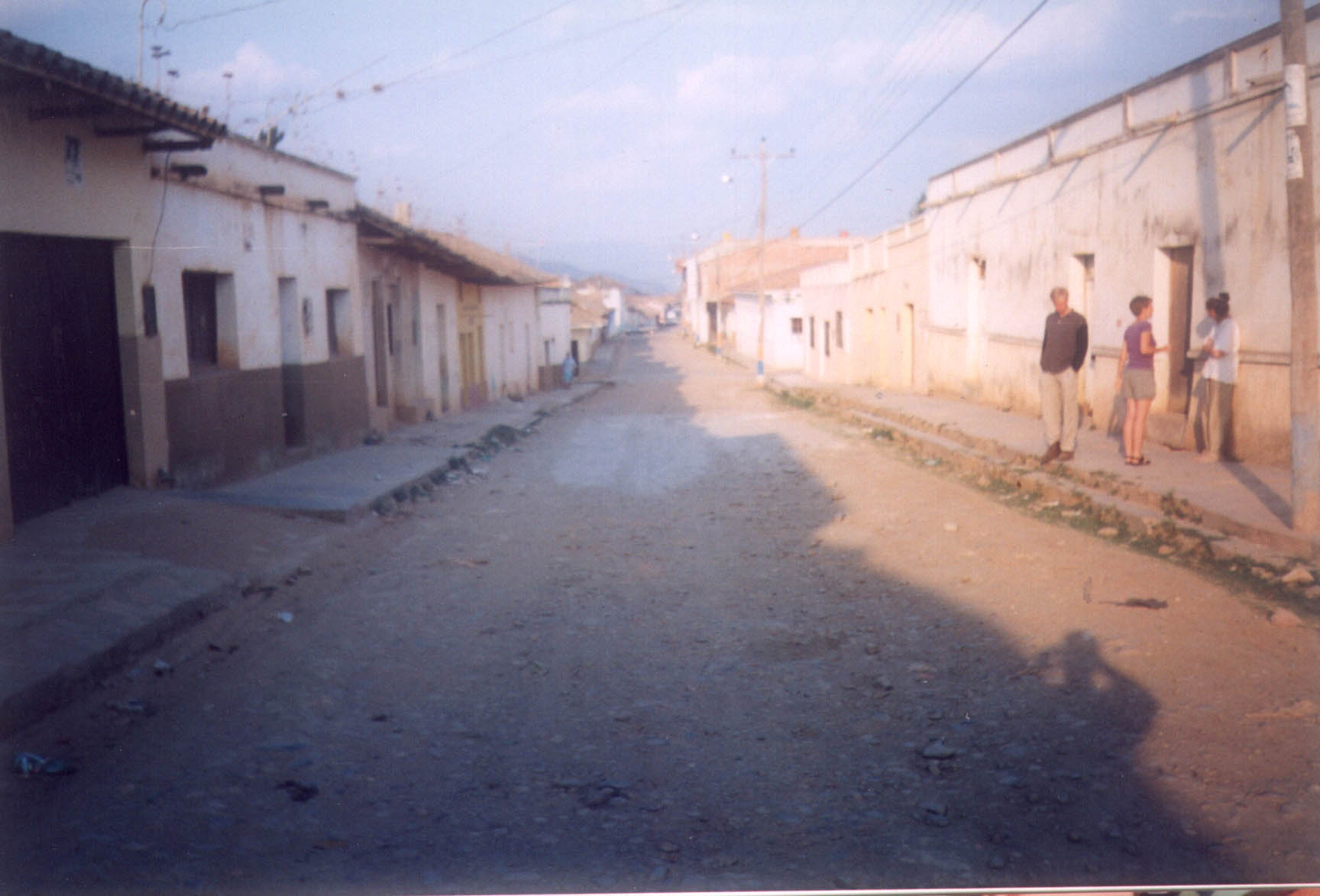
Streetscene. A neglected and unprepossessing exterior often hides a beautiful garden within.

== El Fuerte de Samaipata ==
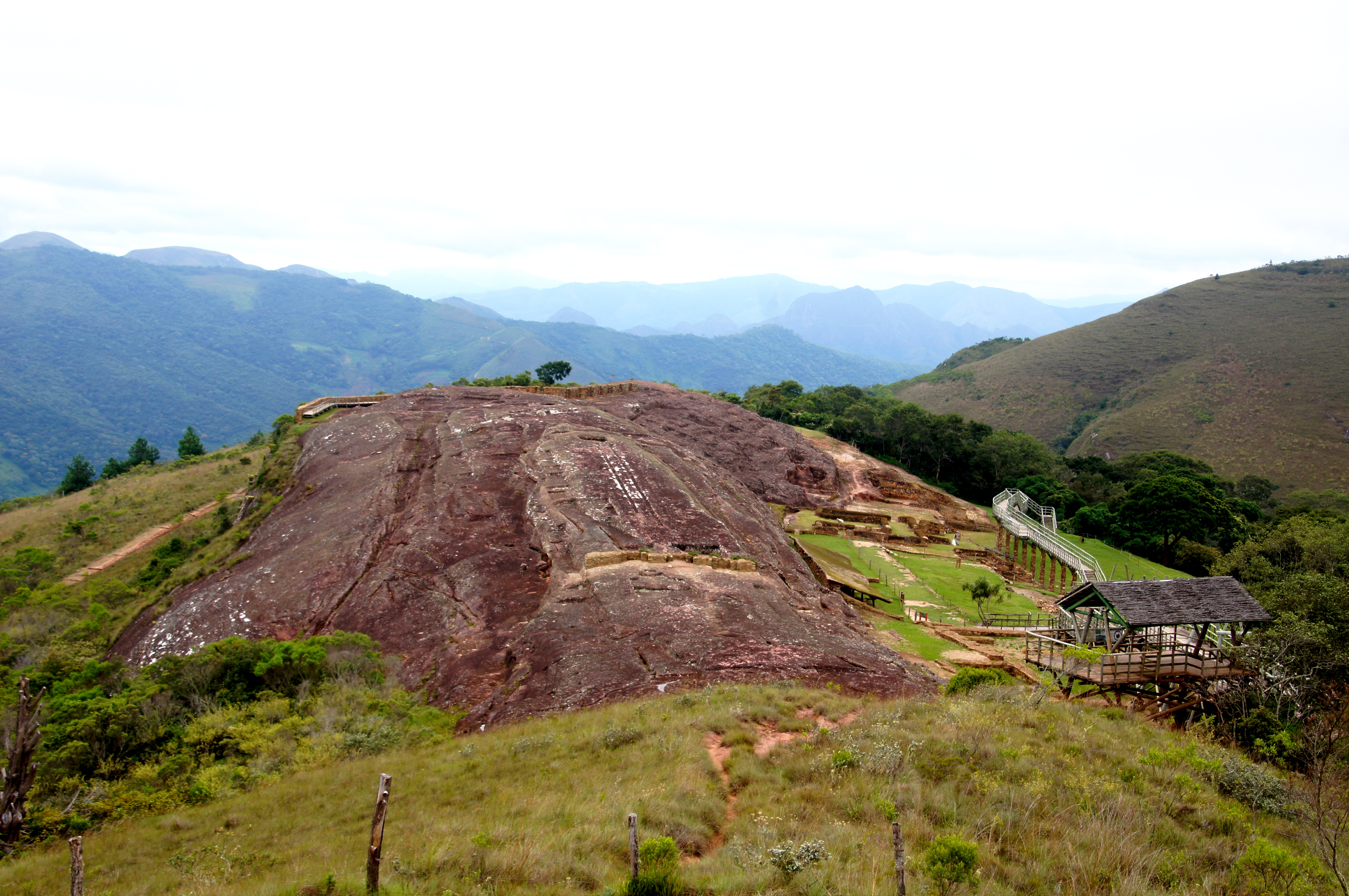
El Fuerte de Samaipata from the viewing platform.

Nearby is the pre-Inca ruin of El Fuerte de Samaipata. It is not actually a fort, but a temple. This is Bolivia's largest pre-Inca site. Declared a world heritage site by UNESCO in 1998, this archaeological complex presents pre-Inca (Chane), Inca, and colonial Spanish ruins. The temple was originally built by the Arawak people most likely belonging to the Chane culture that inhabited the surrounding valleys and the pampas to the East. The temple was carved on an enormous rock. The Incas also built a city adjacent to the temple and established trade and alliances with the Chanes to protect the territories from the constant invasions of warrior Guarani tribes that raided the region from time to time.

It is believed that both Chanes and Incas were eventually defeated by the Guarani warriors, and by the time the Spaniards colonized the region, it was already dominated by Guarani tribes, and El Fuerte was already destroyed. The Spanish colonizers also built a town next to the temple, but it was later abandoned when the inhabitants moved to the base of the valley. The site includes a sloping ramp, pronounced by flying saucer enthusiast Erich von Däniken in his book "Chariots of the Gods" to be a launch platform for spaceships. Some of the site is now cordoned off due to damage caused by visitors walking on the rock carvings.

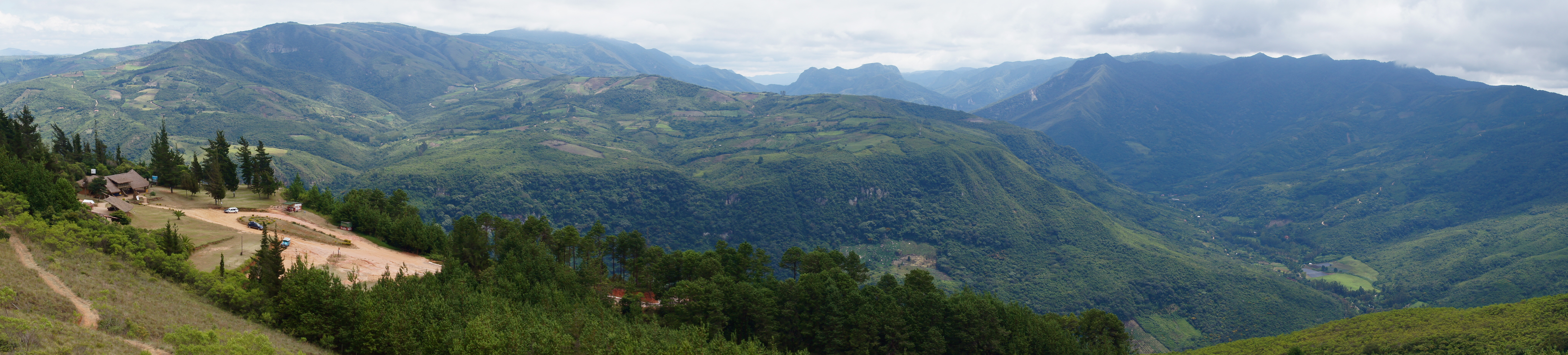
The scenery at the UNESCO, El Fuerte de Samaipata site, including La Muela, the tabletop mountain in the center of the horizon.

== Las Cuevas ==
Also, of interest nearby, Las Cuevas, a pleasant walk by streams and waterfalls. There are several pools and beaches. A small fee is charged for entrance. Camping is not allowed.

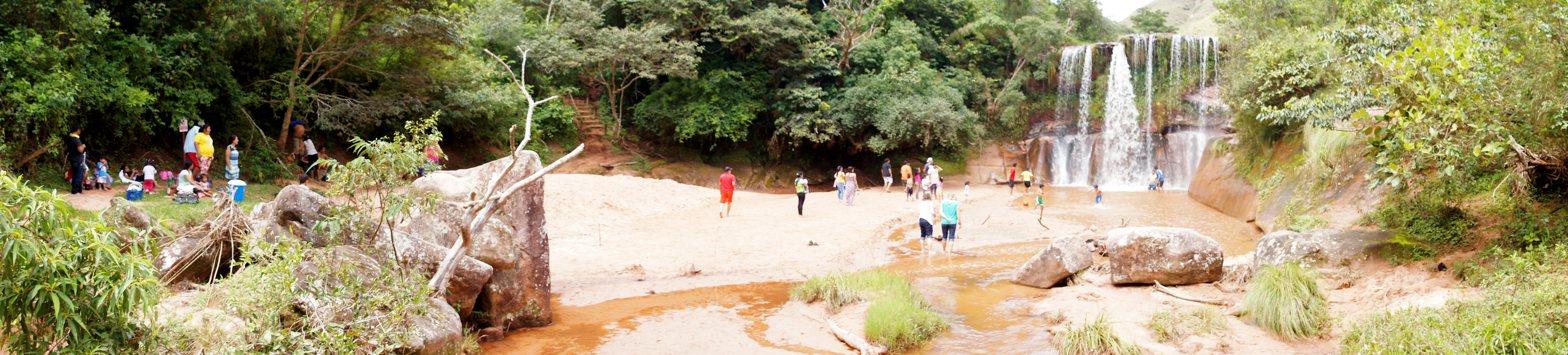
The beach.

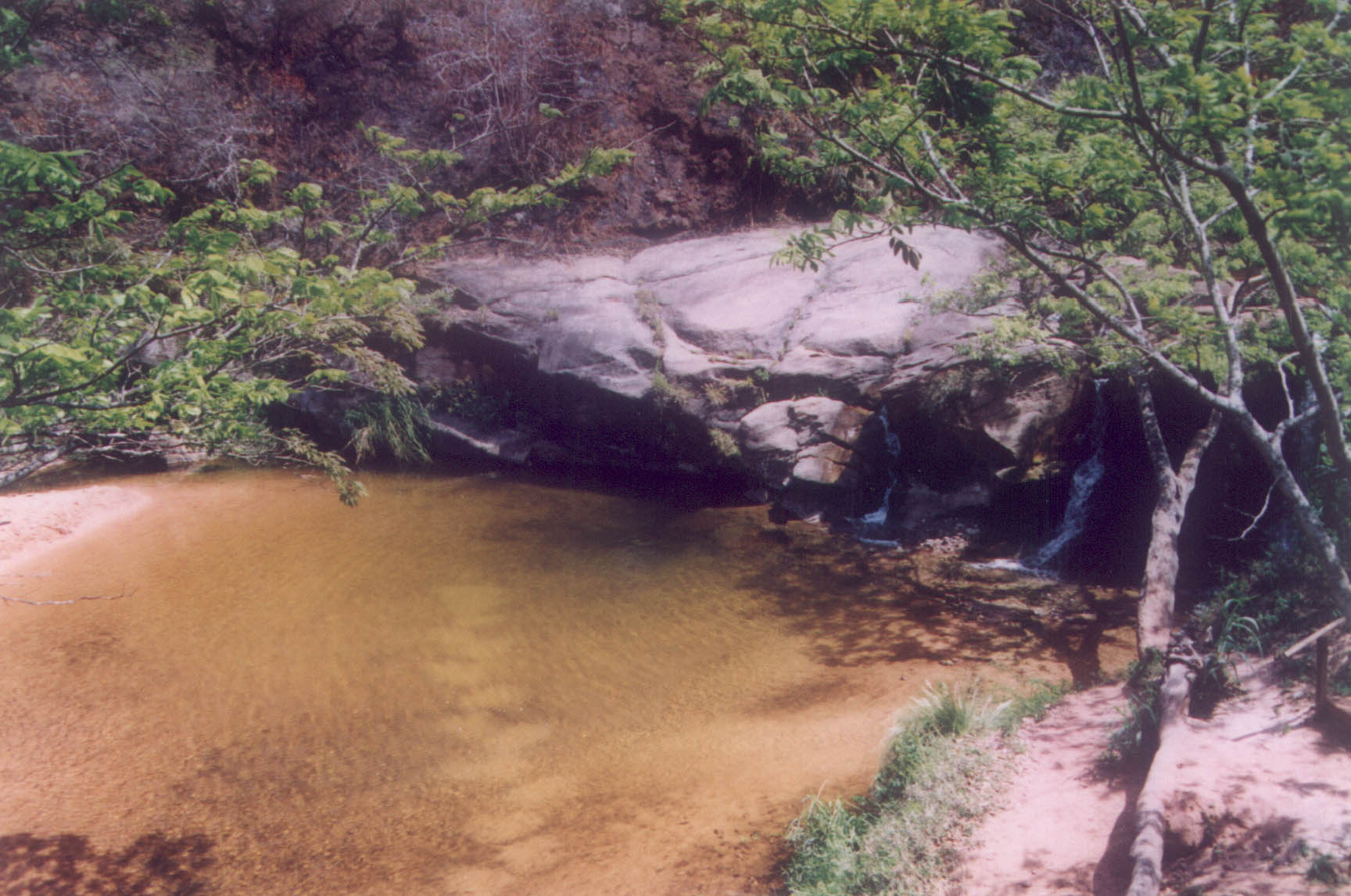
Rock pools and waterfall where the locals swim.

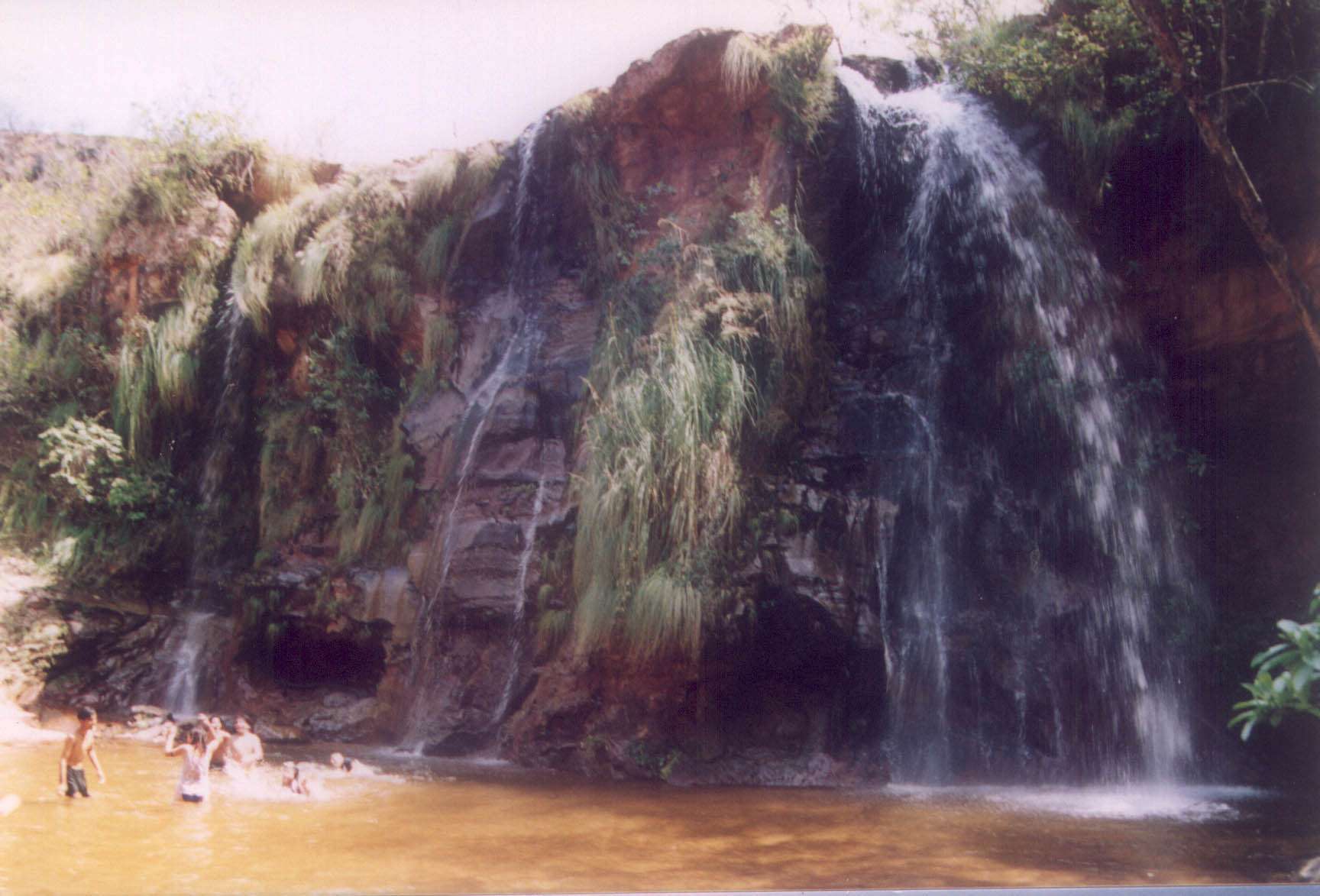
The beach.

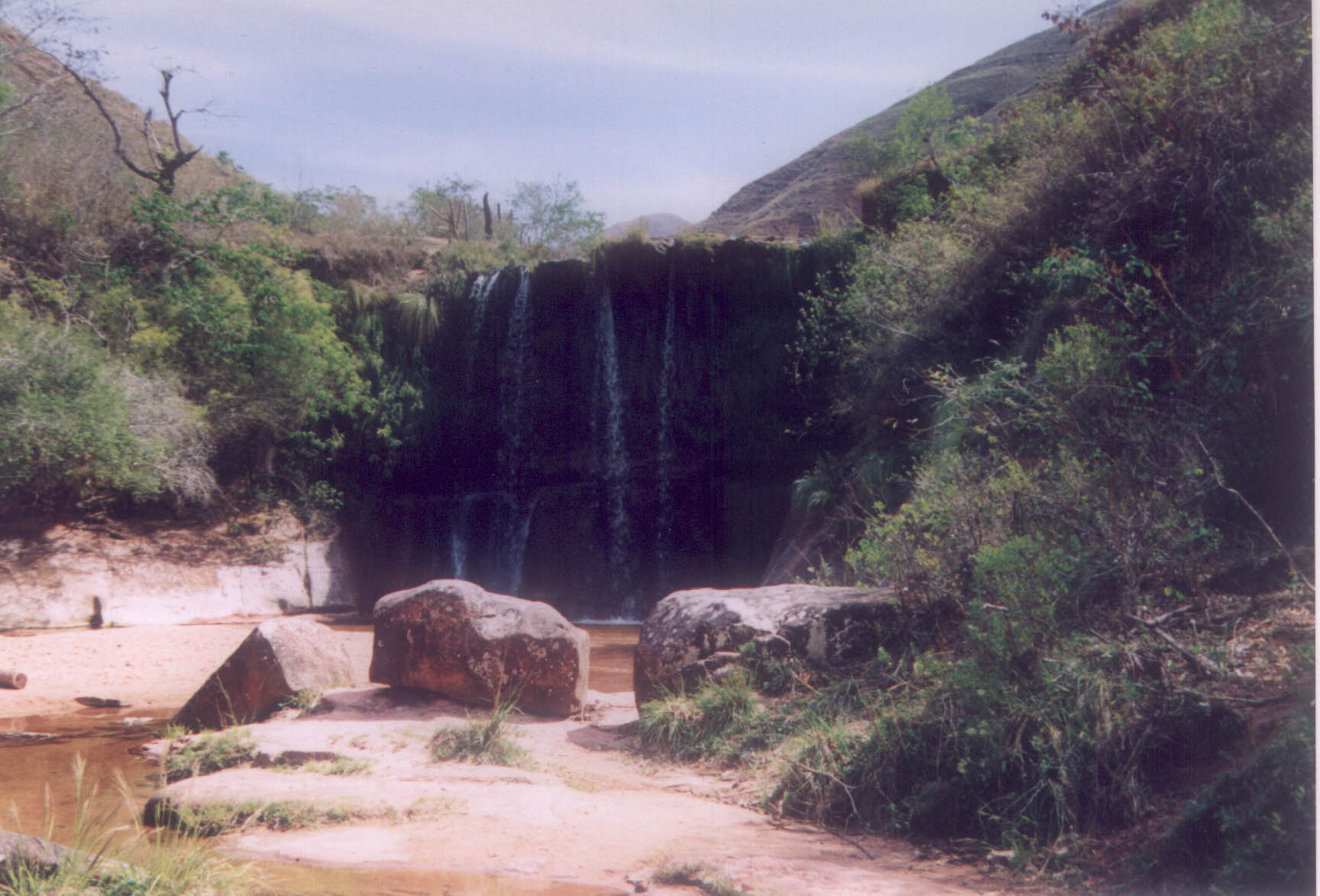
The park extends for several miles.

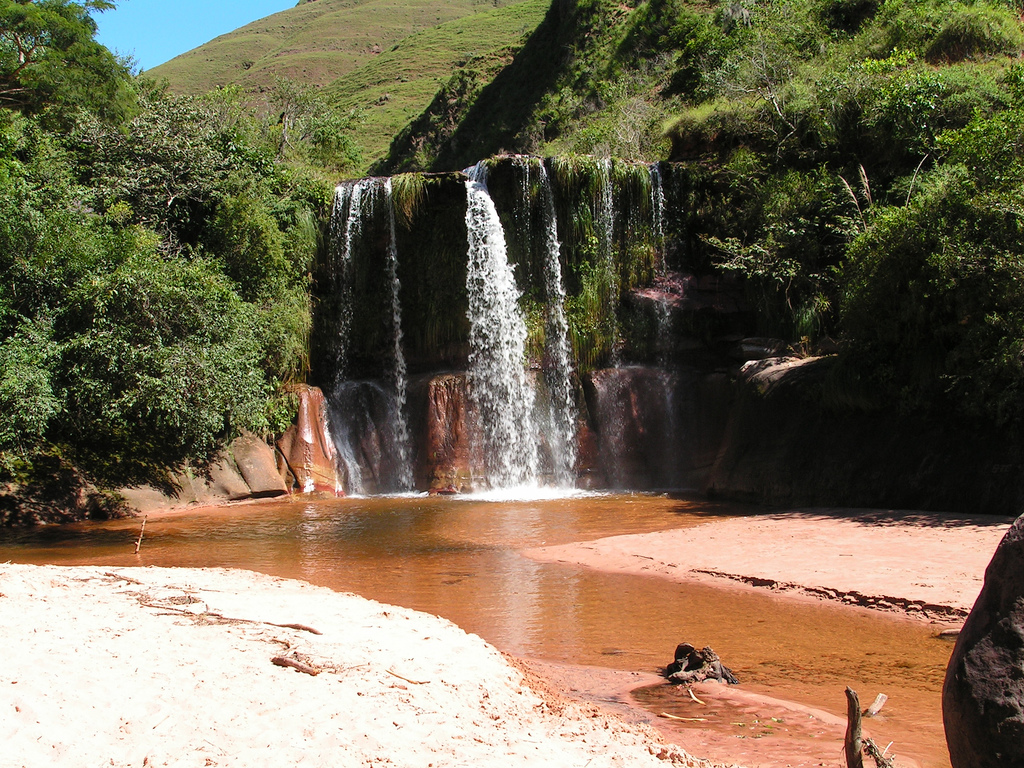
Cuevas Waterfalls

== See also ==
- El Fuerte de Samaipata
