= Terena people =

Indigenous people of Brazil

Terena
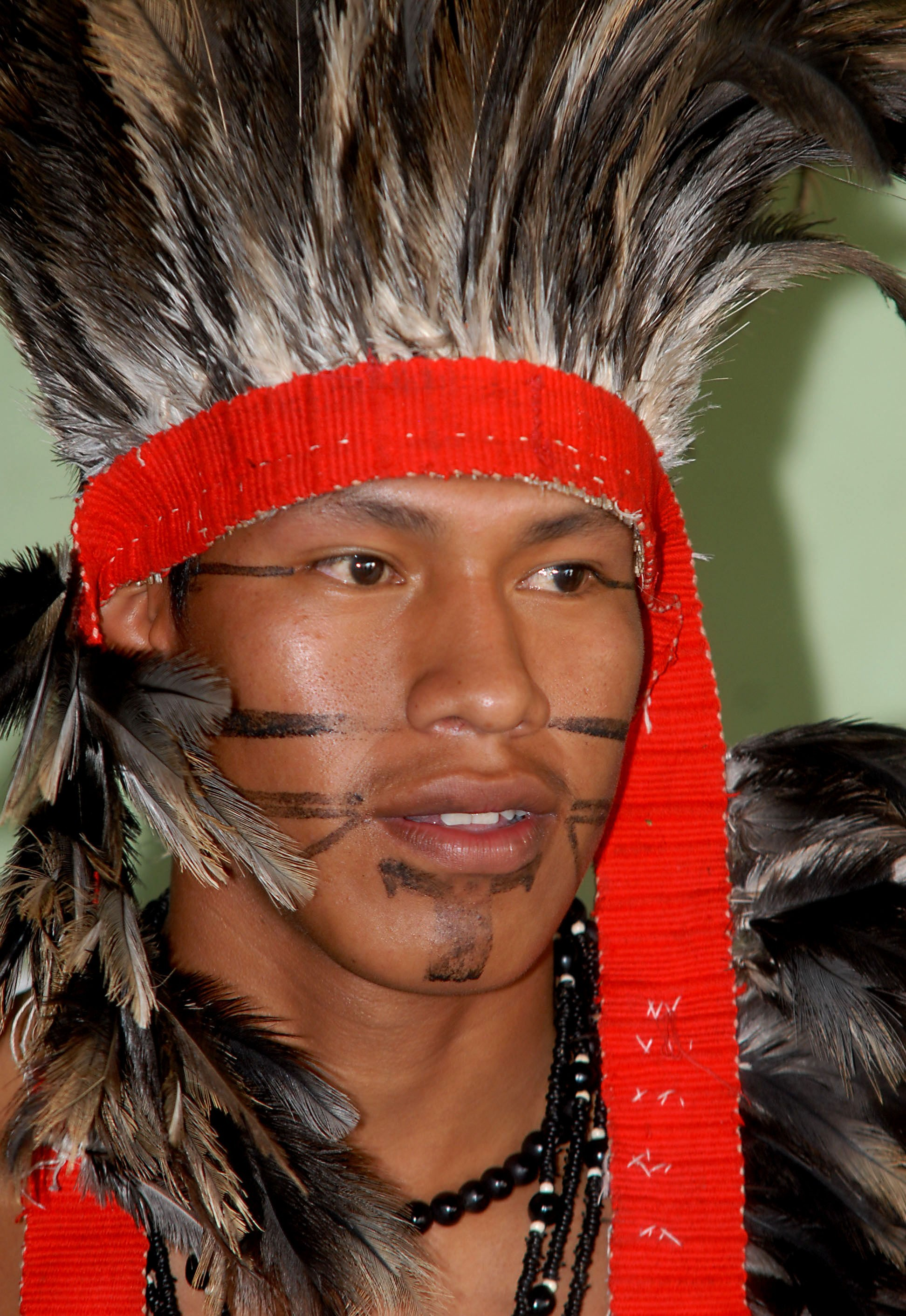
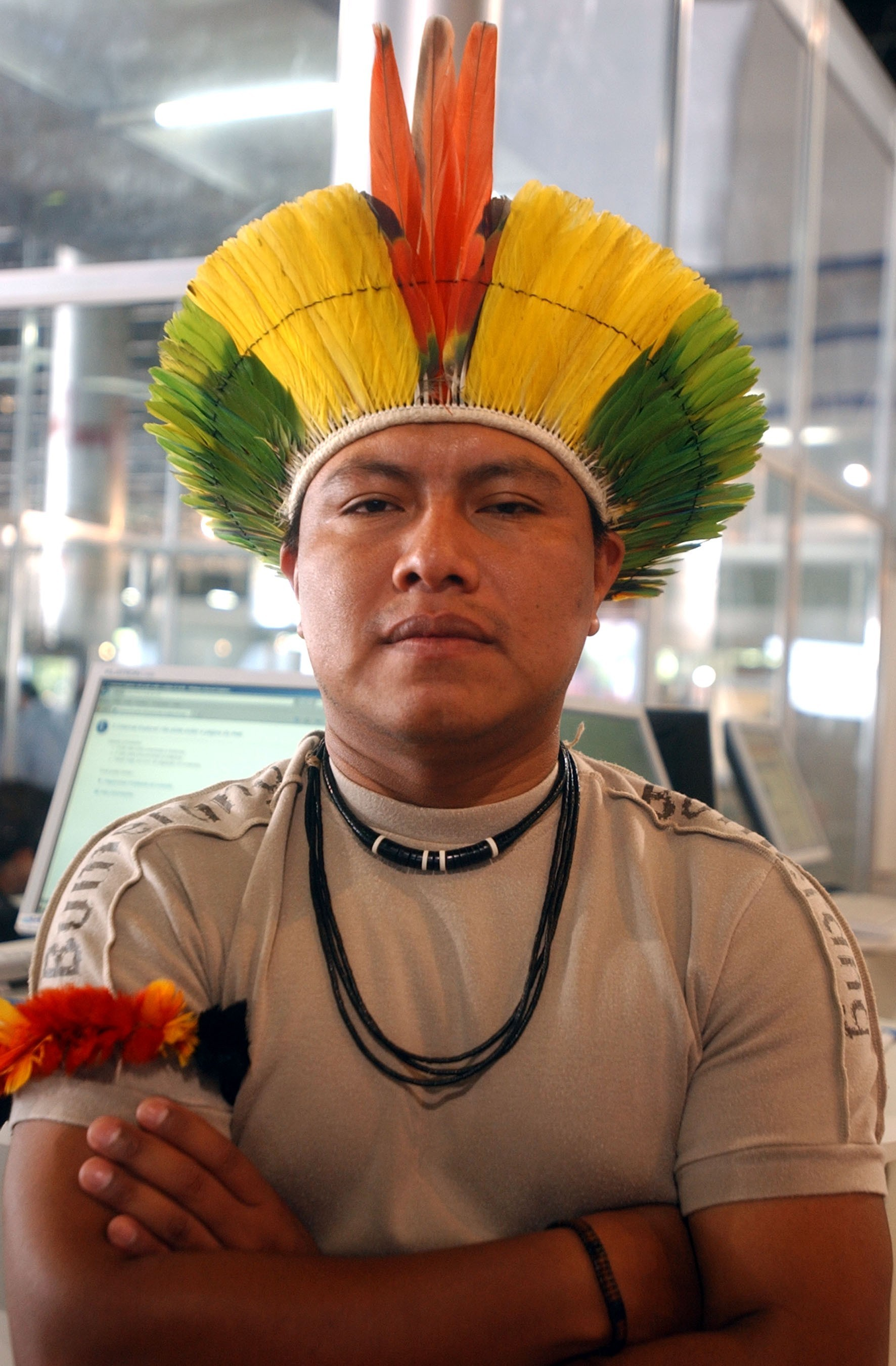
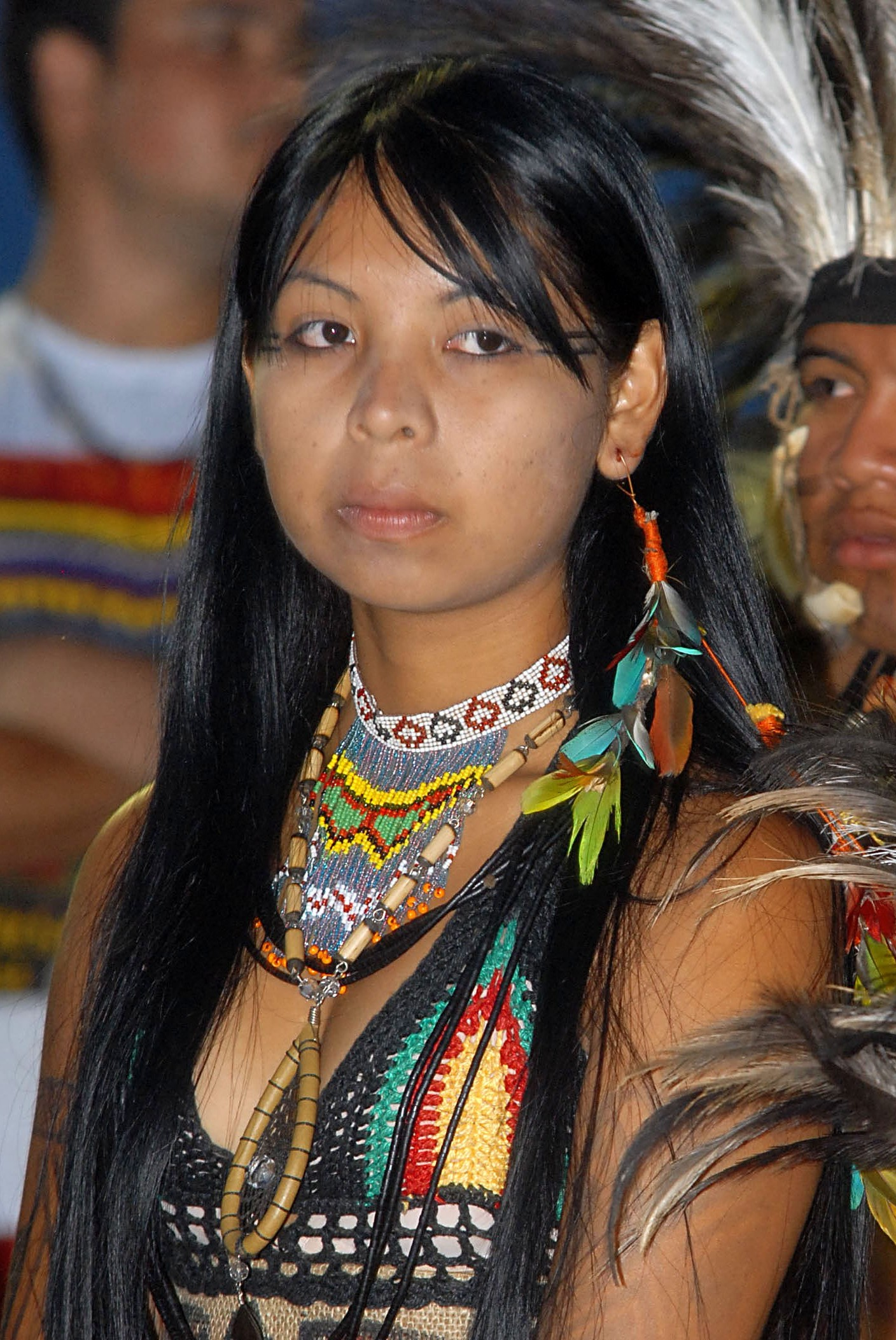
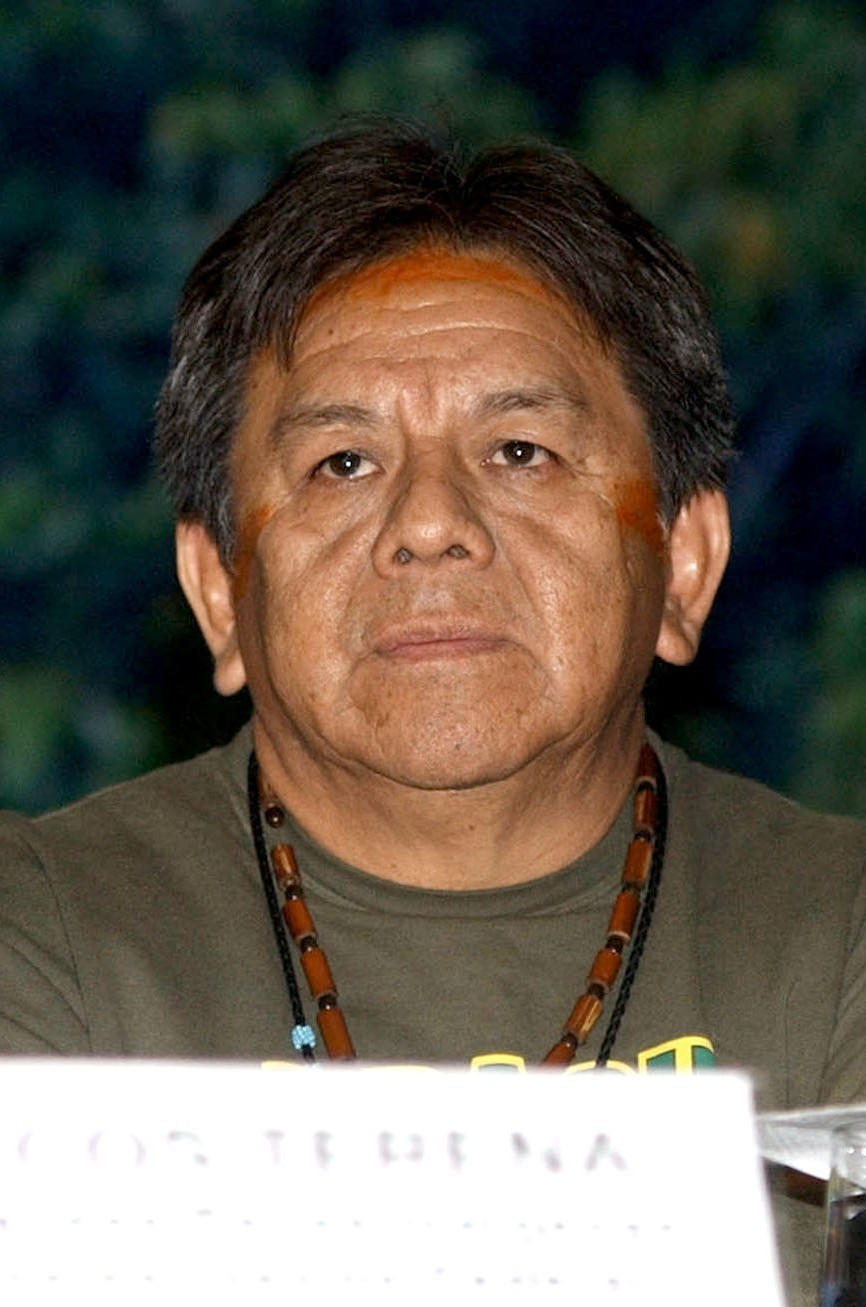
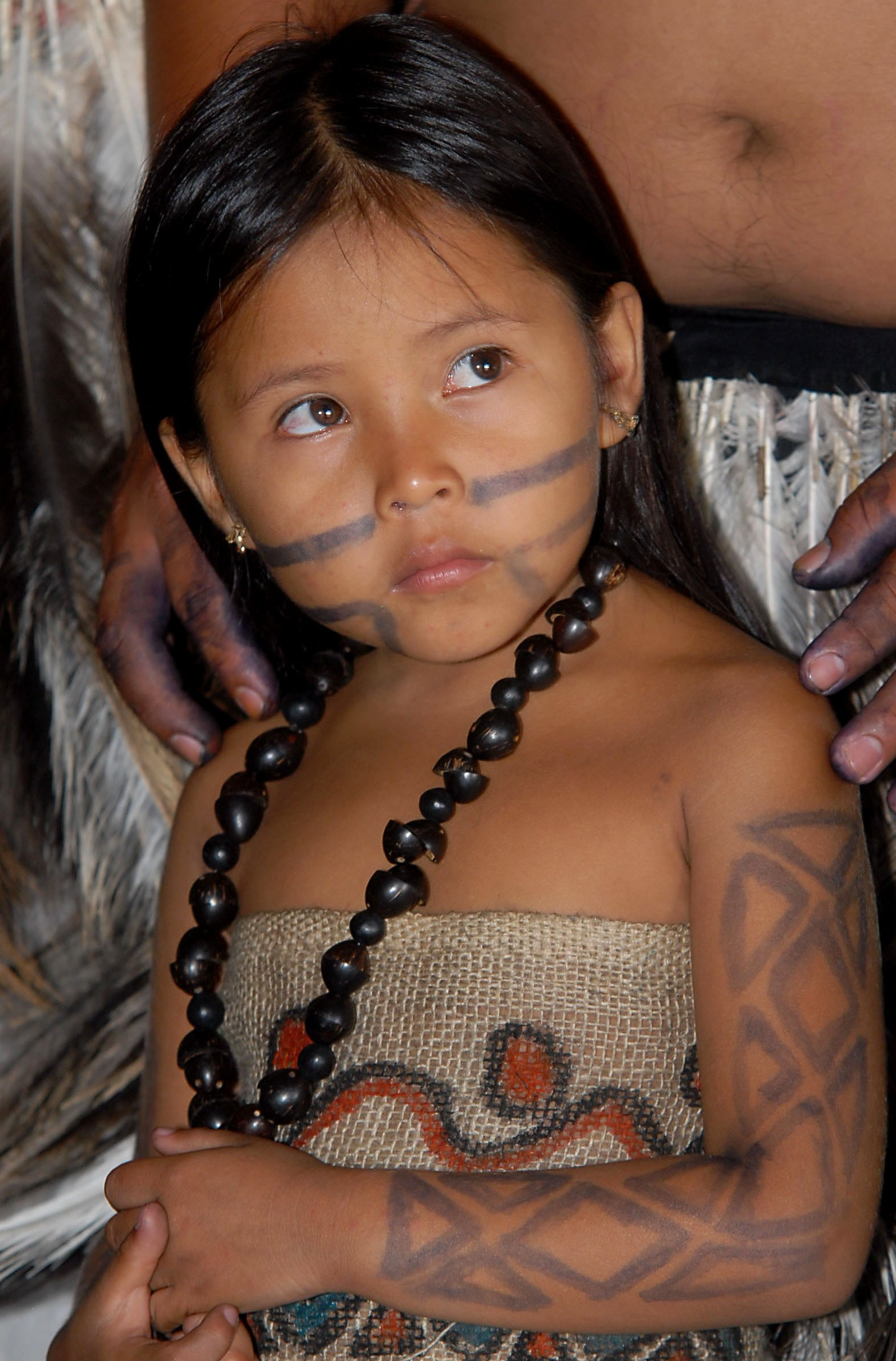
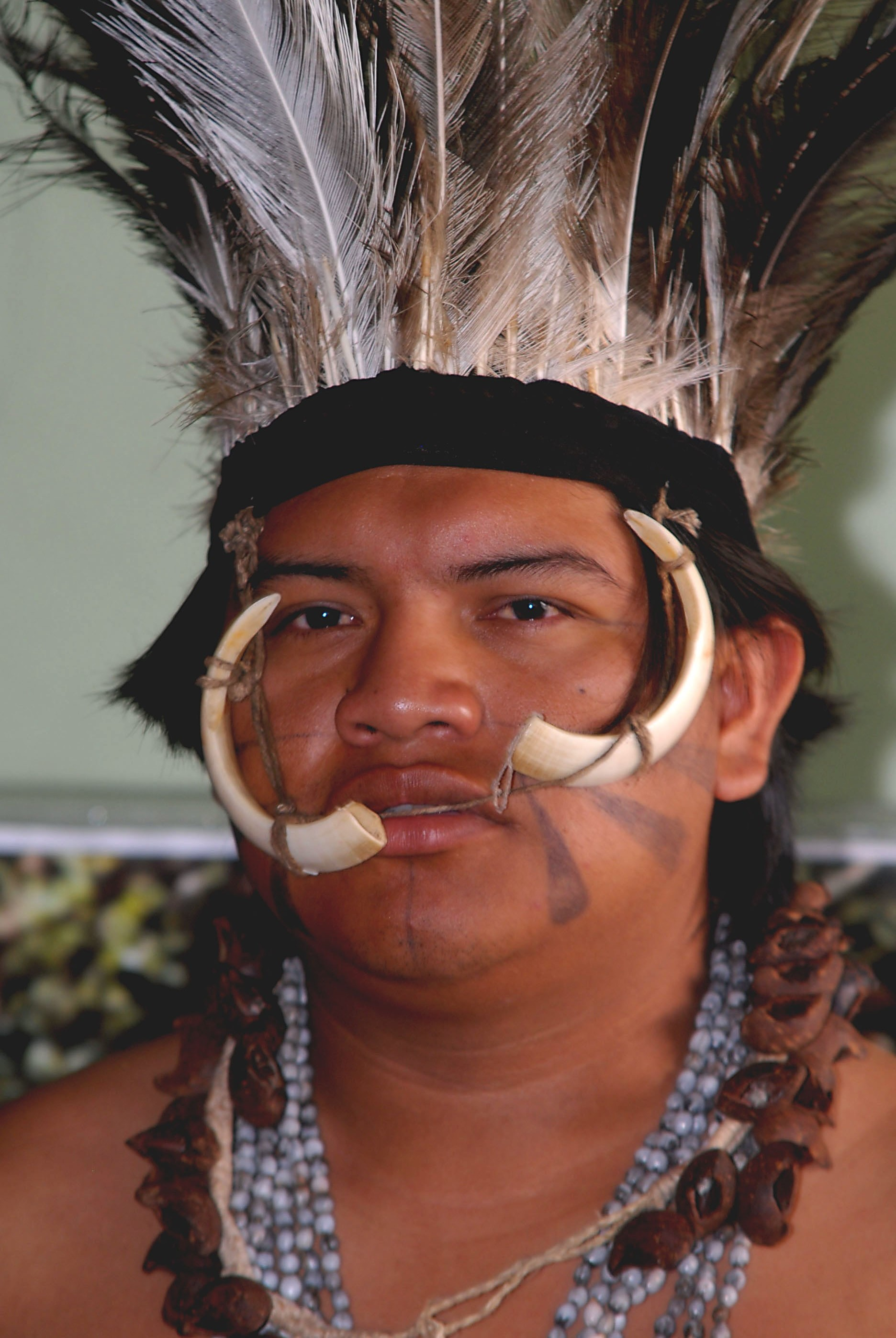

Total population
- 26,065 (2014)

Regions with significant populations
- Brazil

Languages
- Portuguese, Terena, Terena Sign, LIBRAS

The Terena people are a Brazilian Indigenous people that originally inhabited the northeastern region of the Paraguayan Chaco west of the Paraguay River in the mid-19th century. However, they presently reside mainly in the municipalities of Aquidauana and Miranda within the Brazilian state Mato Grosso do Sul, as well as Mato Grosso and São Paulo. This region is generally referred to as the Aquidauana-Miranda region, and geographically lies between 20° and 22° S and 54° and 58° W. The Terena people span numerous indigenous areas including approximately 29 villages. As a result of conflict with colonial powers, the Terena people gradually migrated to their Brazilian territory where they remain today. The Terena are one of four Guaná subgroups that relocated, alongside the Exoaladi, Layana, and the Kinkinau.

== History ==
=== Paraguayan War ===
In 1864 the Paraguayan War started, pitting Paraguay against the Triple Alliance, composed of the Brazilian Empire, Uruguay, and Argentina. This conflict had substantial impacts on indigenous peoples in nowadays Mato Grosso do Sul. The Terena people are noted to have fought jointly with Brazilian military forces during the late 1860s, and sustained substantial losses and attacks on their territories from adversarial troops. The war caused significant land disruption in the region of the Miranda and Aquidauana rivers, causing indigenous populations there, including the Terena, to disperse. As inhabitants of that region, the Terena fled into near, densely forested regions until the official establishment of their land borders in the early 20th century.

==== Aftermath of the war: "Time of Servitude" ====
At the end of the war in 1870, previous Terena land holdings and village territories were quickly taken into ownership by previous members of the Brazilian military and other influential government figures who held political sway after the war. As a result, conflict arose between the Terena, other Guaná subgroups, and the new inhabitants of their lands. These indigenous peoples were venturing back to their previous territories, but were faced with new inhabitants who demanded indigenous labor in return for allowing them to live there. This is referred to the Terena as the "time of servitude".

=== Land establishment ===
Under the establishment of the Serviço de Proteção aos Índios (SPI) in 1910, the state of Mato Grosso requested official Terena Indigenous reserves. Two of these, deemed Cachoeirinha and Taunay, were granted by the state government. Under this agreement, the Terena people were placed under a reservation-like system. In this system, the Terena were designated about 2,000 hectares, a decrease from their original 17,000 hectares of land in the region. In 1988, an amendment was made to the Constitution of Brazil, featuring a new declaration that, within five years of the provision's creation, traditional ancestral lands would be returned to groups of Brazilian indigenous populations. However, modern-day tensions have grown as many lands have yet to be returned.

==== Buriti Farm incident ====
The Buriti Farm incident has become a representation of growing land rights tensions within the Brazilian Indigenous population, specifically pertaining to the Terena peoples. Though violent land disputes between indigenous individuals and state government forces aren't necessarily uncommon in Brazil, the Terena have proved to be a force to be reckoned with through this incident.

On May 15, 2013, a group of hundreds of Terena peoples moved to re-occupy a parcel of land, now owned by a local politician and rancher, that they believe is part of their indigenous ancestral territory. In 2010, the Terena were told that they would receive 42,000 acres their village could utilize as farm land, however, when the legal process halted they considered the land their ancestral home and reoccupied it. At the end of May, the owner of the farm filed a court order to have the Terena occupants removed forcibly. After two weeks of occupation and the court order, the Terena occupants were forcibly evicted on May 30 by local police as gunfire rang out in the early morning hours.

One Terena member, 35-year-old Osiel Gabriel, was killed by gunfire initially under unclear circumstances. The incident drew national attention as he was thought to have been shot by pistoleiros, who are gunmen or assassins hired discretely by farm owners in attempts to rid the farmland of indigenous peoples. This demonstrates the growing tensions between farmers and indigenous peoples in Brazil, where tribes on indigenous reserves say that farmers continue to not respect legal boundaries established. However, it was found that Gabriel was actually shot and killed by uniformed policemen during the eviction, and three others were also seriously injured.

=== Demography ===
Over the course of the past three centuries, the Terena have experienced notable demographic shifts. Among Brazilian indigenous groups, the Terena are one of the few that have actually experienced growth in population numbers. When they migrated into Brazilian territory in the mid 1840s, the Terena population consisted of approximately 3,000 individuals. A century later, in 1950, they numbered 3,800. Data notes that 30 years later in the 1980s, they numbered 12,000. Demographically speaking, a large number of the causes of death prior to the mid-20th century were infectious diseases, namely tuberculosis.

== Society and way of life ==
The Terena are largely an agriculturally focused society, with occupational dominance focusing on agroforestry. Hospitality toward one another is a central value integrated into the fabric of the Terena life-system. They refer to those foreign to their society as "iningone" or "those who eat from the same dish". This colloquial notion is an example of their welcoming nature and innate kindness toward all as a cultural value and way of life.

=== Agriculture ===
In terms of sustenance, the Terena have long been an agriculturally focused society. Principal traditional crops include cassava, rice, beans, maize, potatoes, and sugarcane. Both men and women have historically been accepted as food gatherers in society, a tradition that holds true to this day. The food they gather not only serves as sustenance for the Terena themselves, but is also a source of economic profit. The Terena sell the excess crops from harvests in the Mato Grosso do Sul center. This is easily accessible nearly daily for the Terena people to travel to by train.

Aside from harvesting crops, cattle-raising has also become a prominent feature among Terena farm lands. However, given the land limitations of the reserves, it is noted that cattle-raising has also become a source of internal conflict among the Terena. Other livestock are also present among Terena farms and households, including chickens and pigs.

=== Crafting ===
The Terena also have traditional crafting activities, namely pottery and spinning cotton to form items like belts, hammocks, etc. Pottery is still one of the principal crafting practices in the culture today, with many Terena individuals creating pottery for themselves and to sell.

=== Marriage and relationships ===
Historically, marriage and romantic relationships between those who are direct blood relatives, or "consanguineal" kin, are not permitted among the Terena. As their culture has been continually influenced by Christianity and Christian principles, monogamy has become the typical nature of marriage among the Terena. Furthermore, maternal parents, or parents of the bride, control much of the partner or suitor selection process. Also, the Terena society is a patrilocal one. This means that it is a societal standard among the Terena that young married couples go to live in the husband's father's home post-marriage. This usually lasts the first couple years of marriage until the newly married couple births children, after which they will establish a new residence.

== Language and dialect ==
The language of the Terena people belongs to the Arawak family, and is reported to have incorporated elements of the Mbayá-Guaikuru family as well. Linguistic studies focusing on the Bolivia-Parana subsector found the highest degree of linguistic similarity between Terena, Mojeño, and Paunaka languages than others in their subgroup. Scholars describe the Awarakan family as a language "matrix" indigenous to South American regions spanning the Terena territory within Brazil. Etymology is deeply integrated into kinship relationships among the Terena, reflected in familial word structuring and terminology.
