= Terêna language =

Arawakan language of Brazil

Terêna
- Etelena
- Native to: Brazil
- Region: Mato Grosso do Sul
- Ethnicity: Terena people
- Native speakers: 16,000 (2006)
- Language family: Arawakan: Southern; Bolivia–Parana; Terêna
- Dialects: Terena proper; Chané †; Guaná †; Kinikinao †

Language codes
- ISO 639-2: ter
- ISO 639-3: Variously: ter – Terena gqn – Kinikinao & Guaná caj – Chané
- Glottolog: tere1279
- ELP: Terena
- Guana (Brazil)

Terêna or Etelena is an Arawakan language spoken by the Terena people of Brazil. The language has a dictionary and written grammar. Many Terena people have low Portuguese proficiency. It is spoken in Mato Grosso do Sul. About 20% are literate in their language, 80% literate in Portuguese.

Terêna has an active–stative syntax and verb-object-subject as default word order.

== Dialects ==
Terêna originally had four varieties: Kinikinao, Terena proper, Guaná, and Chané. These varieties have sometimes been considered to be separate languages. Carvalho (2016) has since demonstrated all four to be the same language. Only Terena proper is still spoken.

== Language contact ==
Terena originated in the Northwestern Chaco. As a result, many Northern Guaicuruan loanwords can be found in Terena.

There are also many Tupi-Guarani loanwords in Terena and other southern Arawakan languages.

== Phonology ==
=== Consonants ===
		Labial	Alveolar	Palatal	Velar	Glottal
Plosive	voiceless	p	t	(tʃ)	k	ʔ
Plosive	prenasal	ᵐb	ⁿd		ᵑɡ	
Fricative	voiceless		s	ʃ		h
Fricative	prenasal		ⁿz	ⁿʒ		
Nasal		m	n	(ɲ)		
Tap			ɾ			
Lateral			l	(ʎ)		
Approximant		w ~ v		j		

/w, ʃ, n, l/ may often be heard as [v, tʃ, ɲ, ʎ].

=== Vowels ===
	Front	Central	Back
High	i ĩ iː	(ɨ)	u ũ uː
Mid	e ẽ eː		o õ oː
Mid	ɛ ɛː		ɔ ɔː
Low		a ã aː	

[ɨ] is heard as an allophone of /i/.

== See also ==
- Terena Sign Language
