= List of amphibians and reptiles of Saint Lucia =

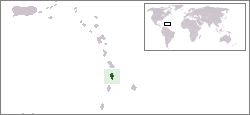
Location of Saint Lucia in the Caribbean

This is a list of amphibians and reptiles found on the island-nation of Saint Lucia, located in the Caribbean Lesser Antilles.

== Amphibians ==
There are three species of amphibian on Saint Lucia, two of which were introduced.

=== Frogs (Anura) ===
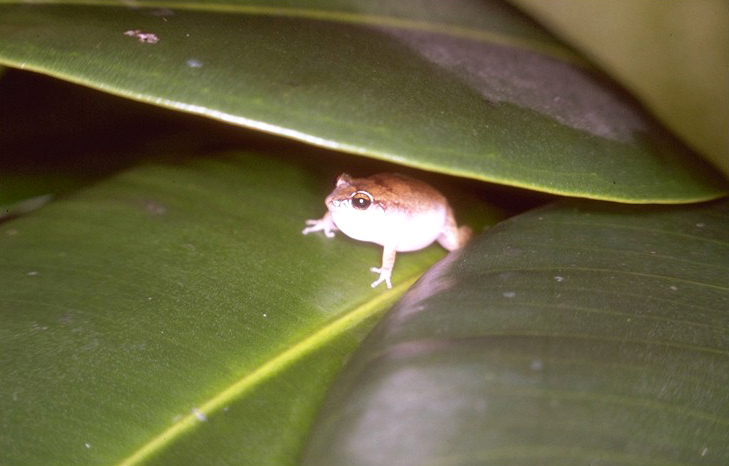
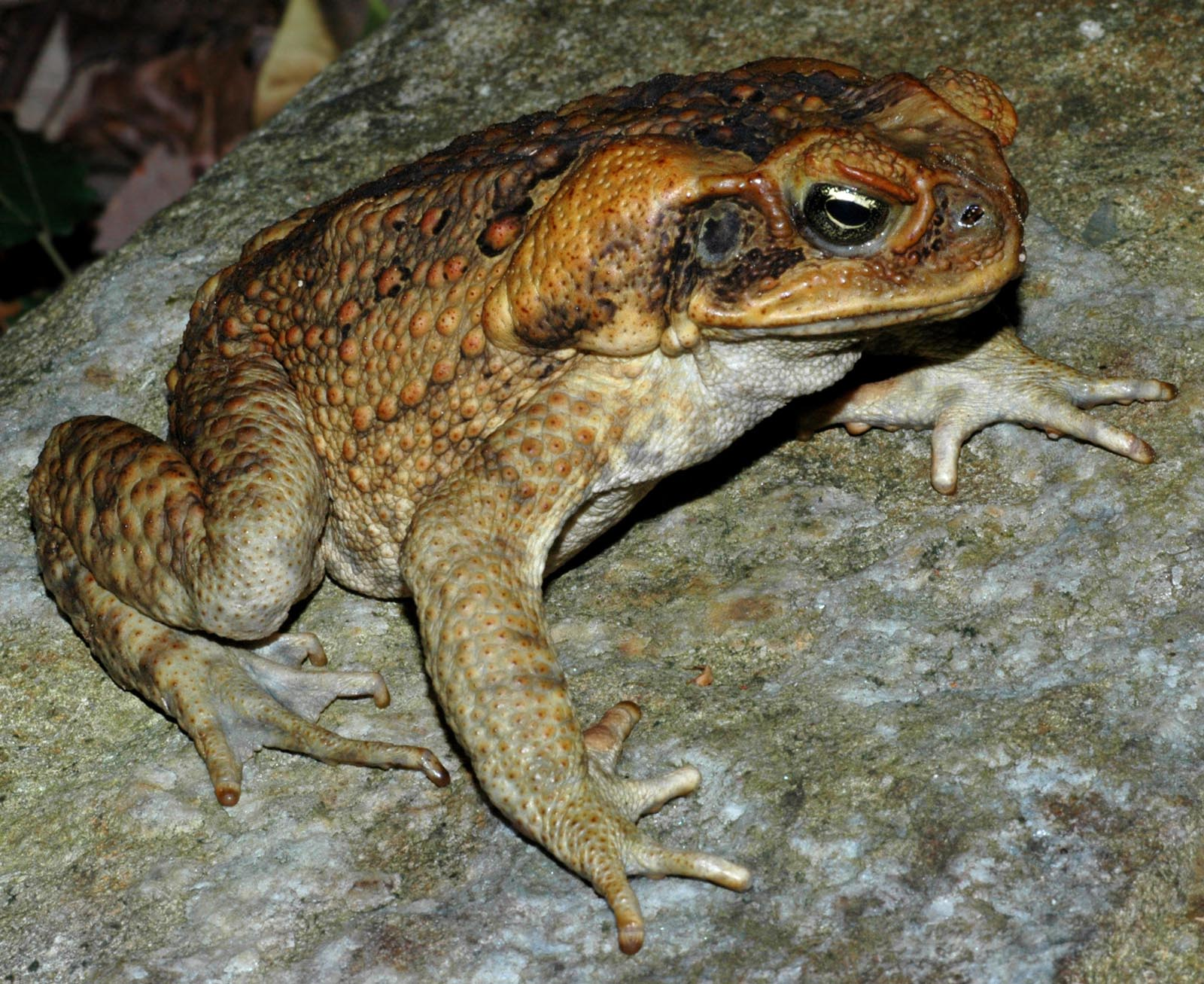
Tree frogs (Hylidae)
Species	Common name(s)	Notes	Image
Scinax ruber	Red-snouted tree frog	Least concern.
Tropical frogs (Leptodactylidae)
Species	Common name(s)	Notes	Image
Eleutherodactylus johnstonei	Lesser Antillean whistling frog, coqui Antillano, Johnstone's whistling frog	Least concern.
True toads (Bufonidae)
Species	Common name(s)	Notes	Image
Bufo marinus	Cane toad, giant neotropical toad, marine toad	Least concern. Introduced.

== Reptiles ==
Including marine turtles and introduced species, there are 20 reptile species reported on Saint Lucia, five of which are endemic and two extinct.

=== Turtles (Testudines) ===
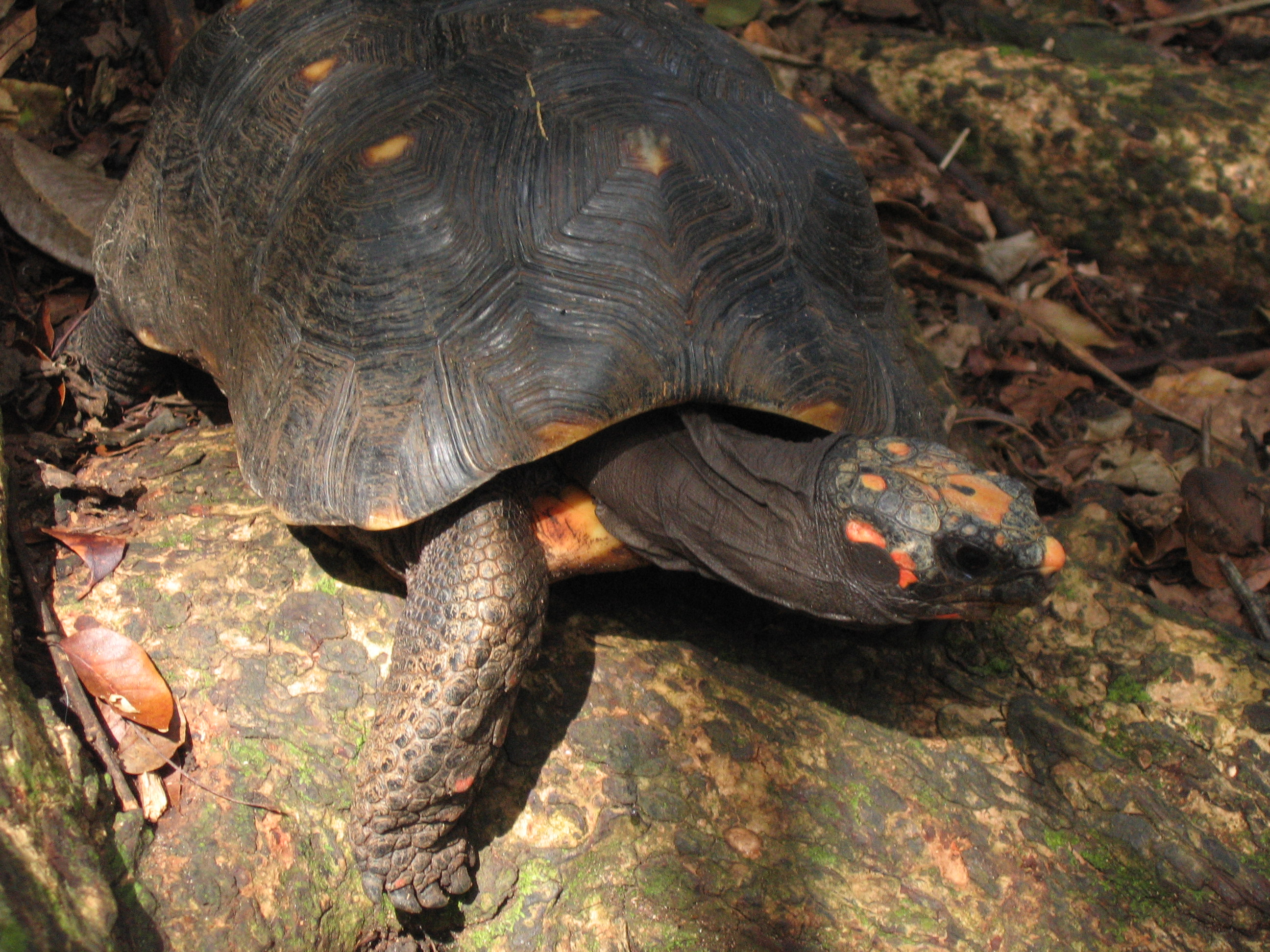
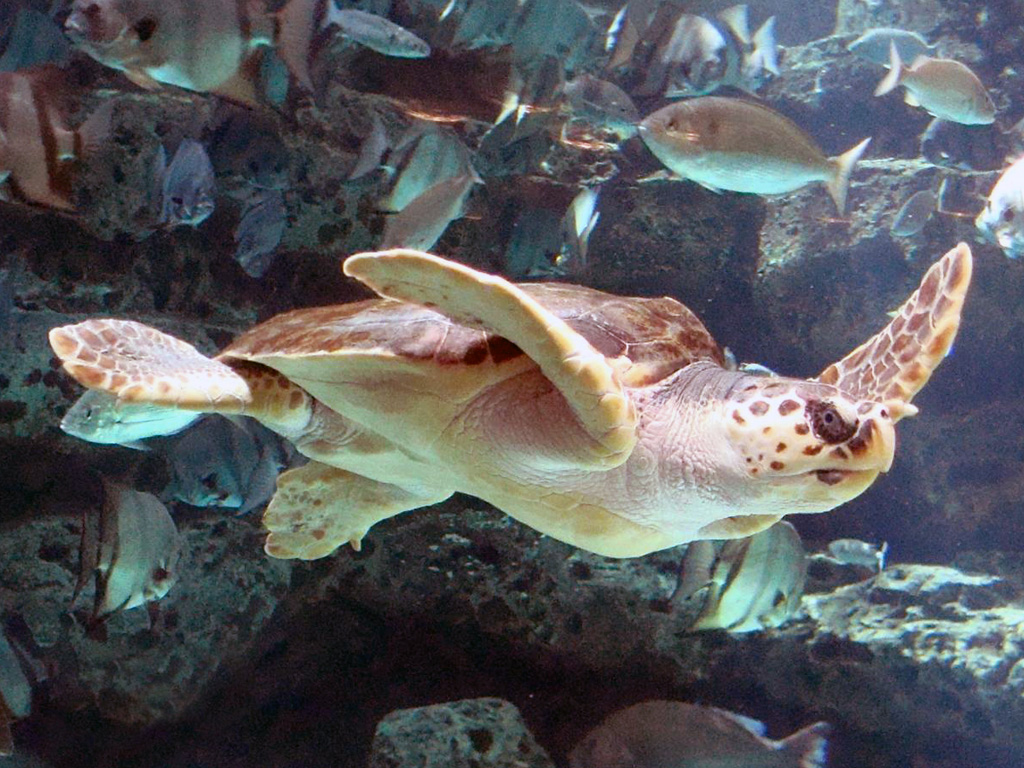
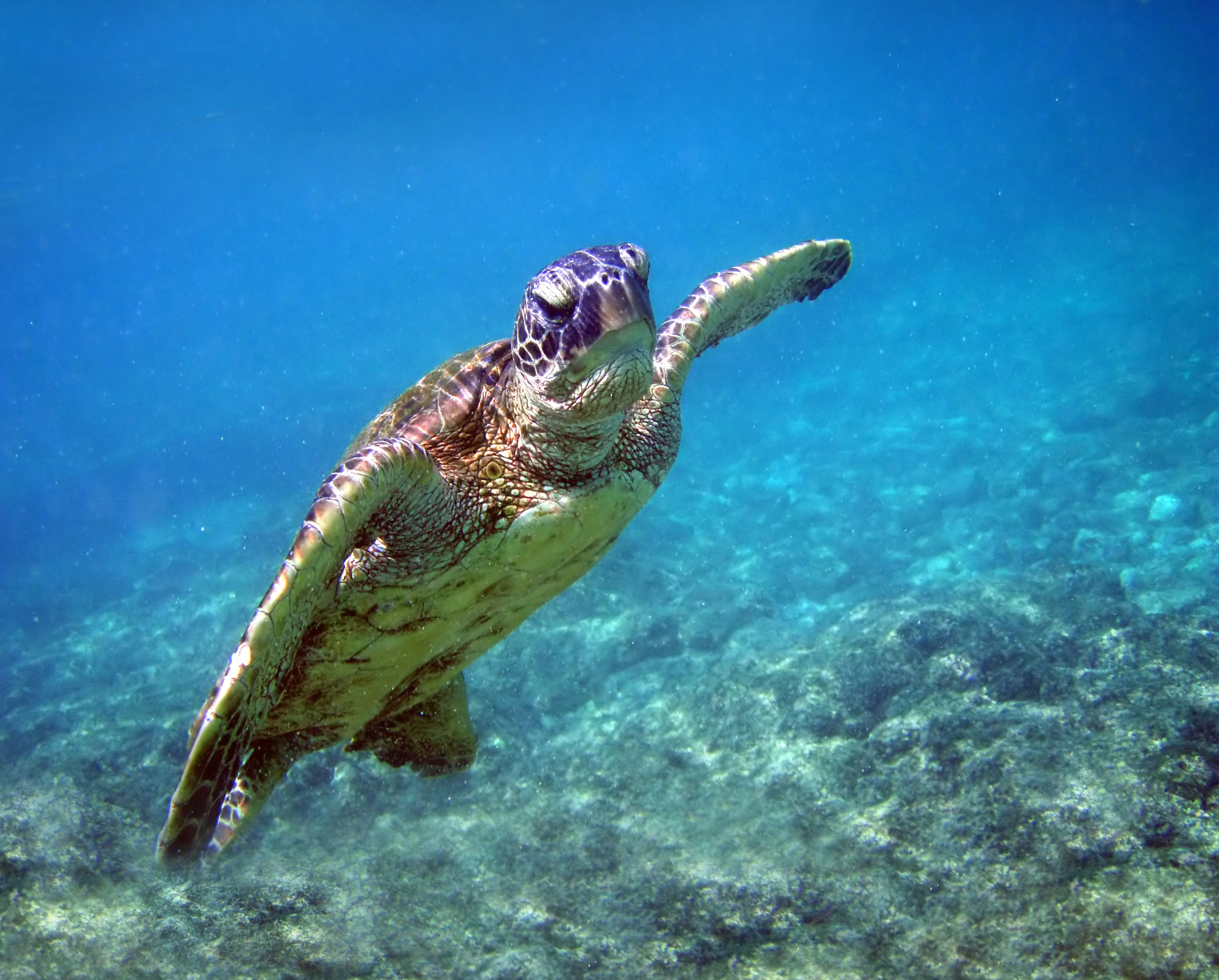
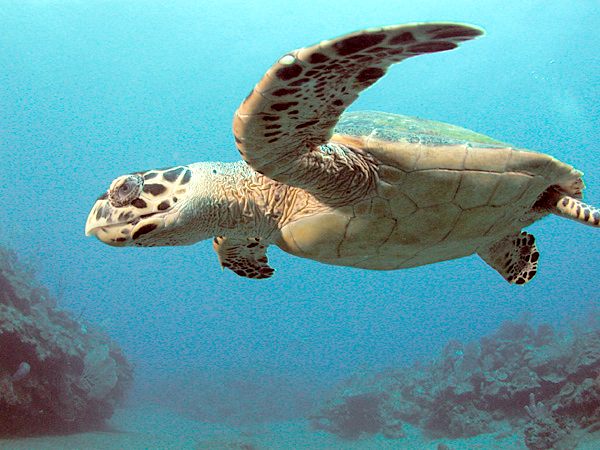
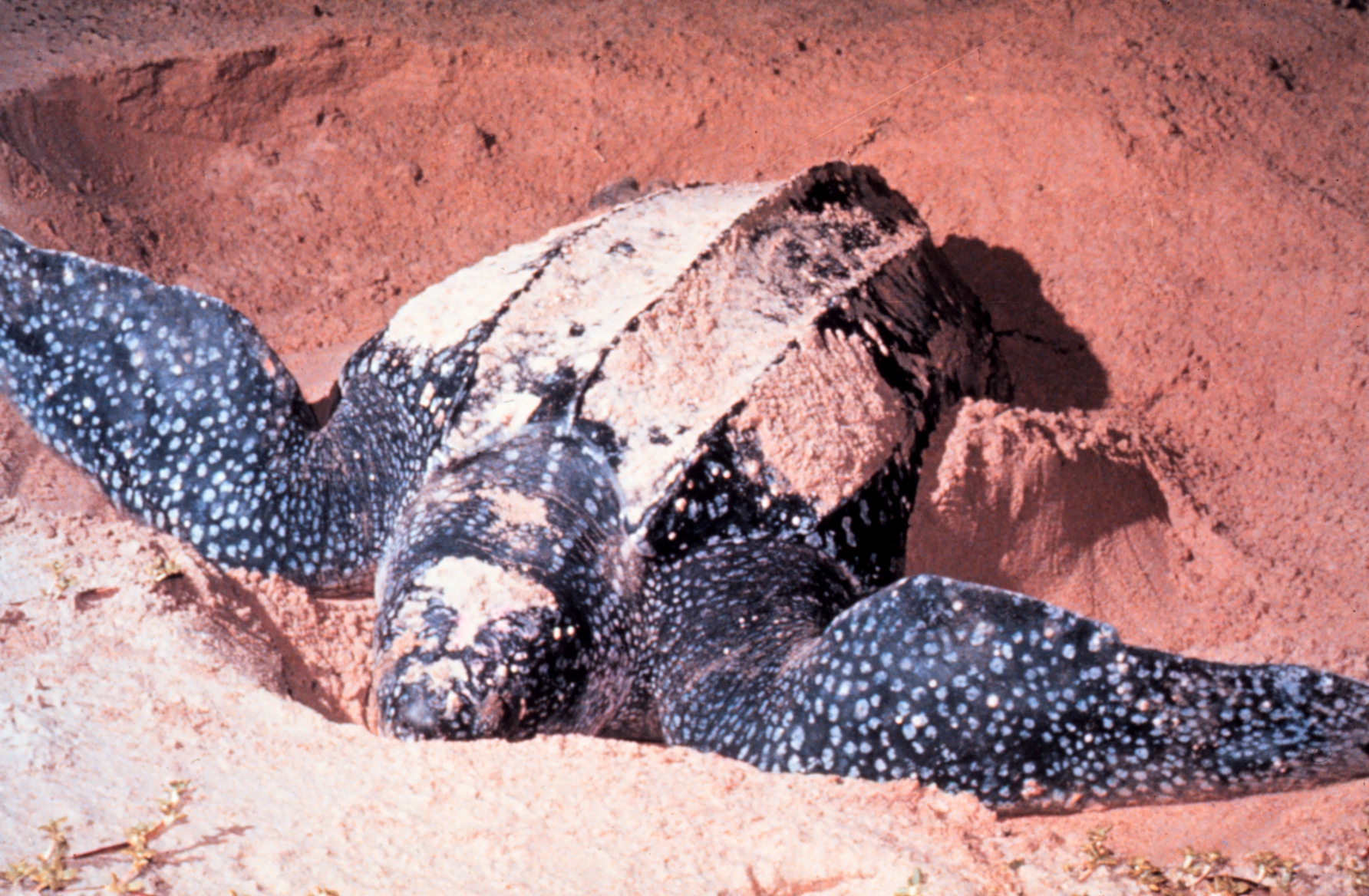
Tortoises (Testudinidae)
Species	Common name(s)	Notes	Image
Geochelone carbonaria	Red-footed tortoise	Likely recent introduction, though possibly as long ago as Amerindian settlement of Saint Lucia. Rarely seen in the wild.
Scaly sea turtles (Cheloniidae)
Species	Common name(s)	Notes	Image
Caretta caretta	Loggerhead turtle, channel turtle (local name)	Endangered.
Chelonia mydas	Green turtle	Endangered. Regularly seen in coastal waters; nests on both coasts (though mainly on northern beaches), primarily from June to October.
Eretmochelys imbricata	Hawksbill turtle	Critically endangered. Regularly seen in coastal waters; nests on both coasts (though mainly on northern beaches), primarily from May to October.
Leathery sea turtles (Dermochelyidae)
Species	Common name(s)	Notes	Image
Dermochelys coriacea	Leatherback turtle	Critically endangered. Fairly rare. Nesting recorded from April to June, primarily on south and east (Atlantic) coast beaches.

=== Lizards and snakes (Squamata) ===
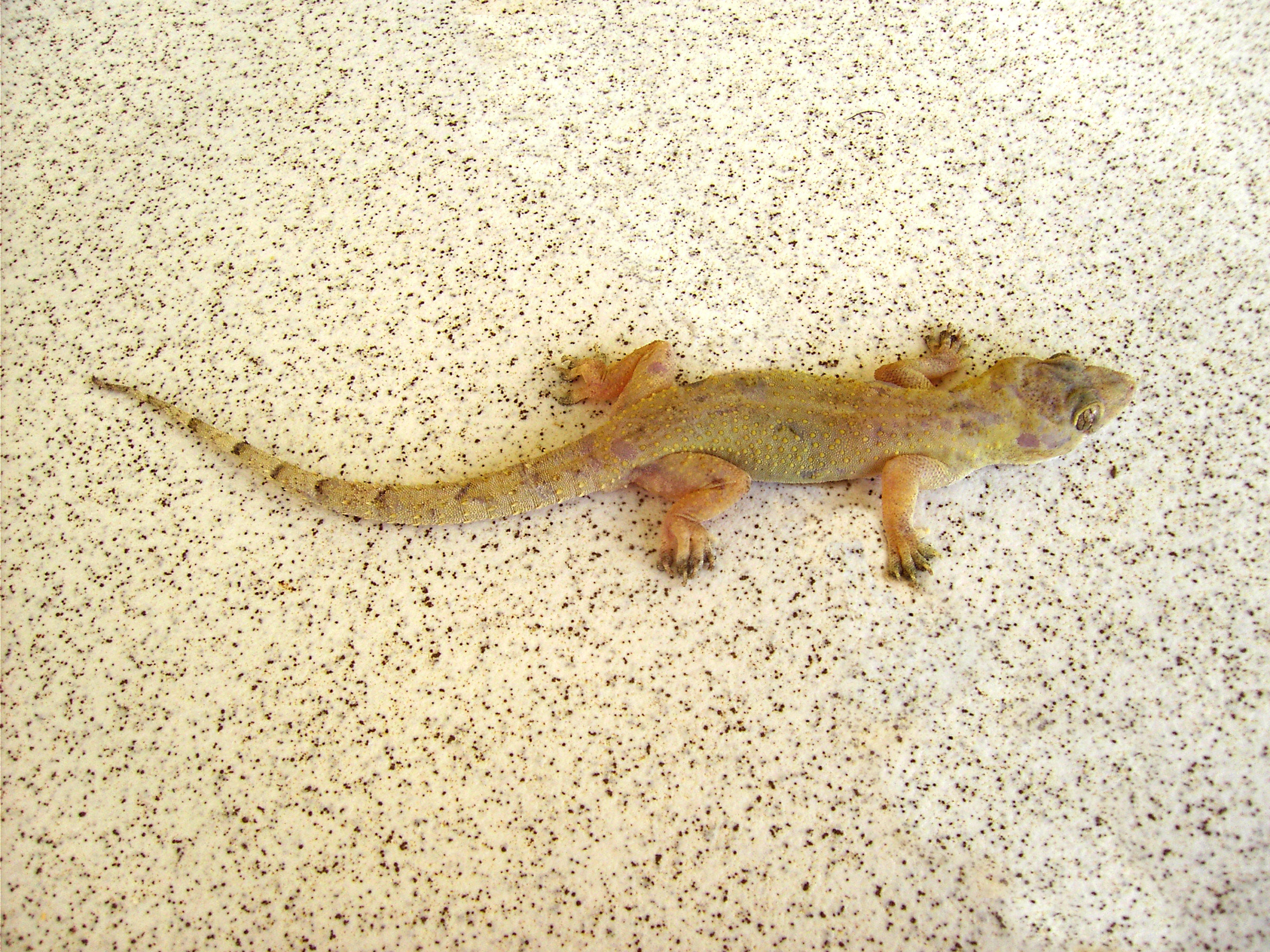
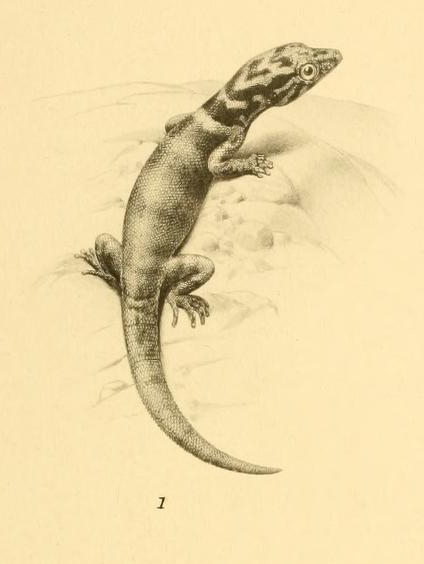
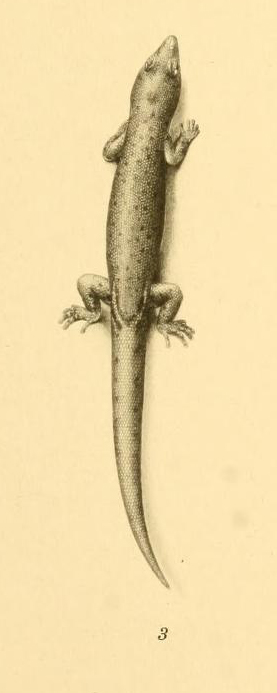
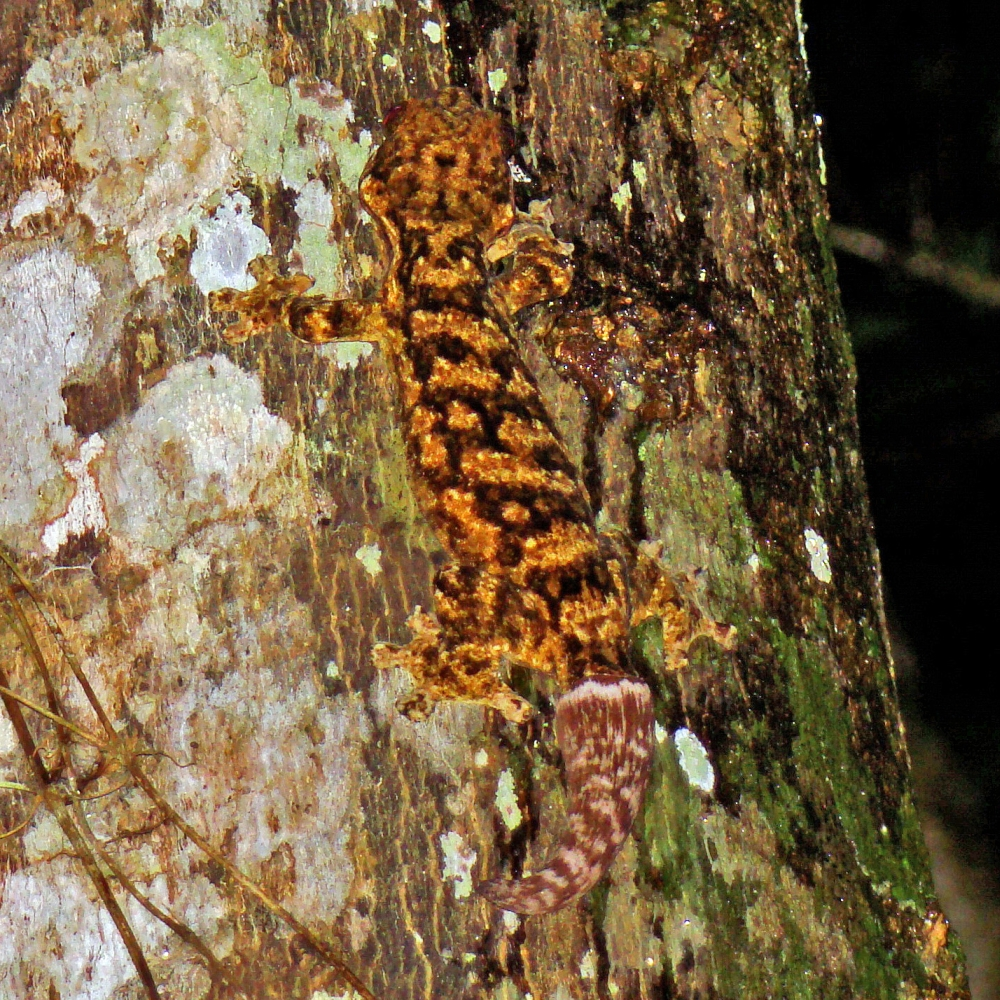
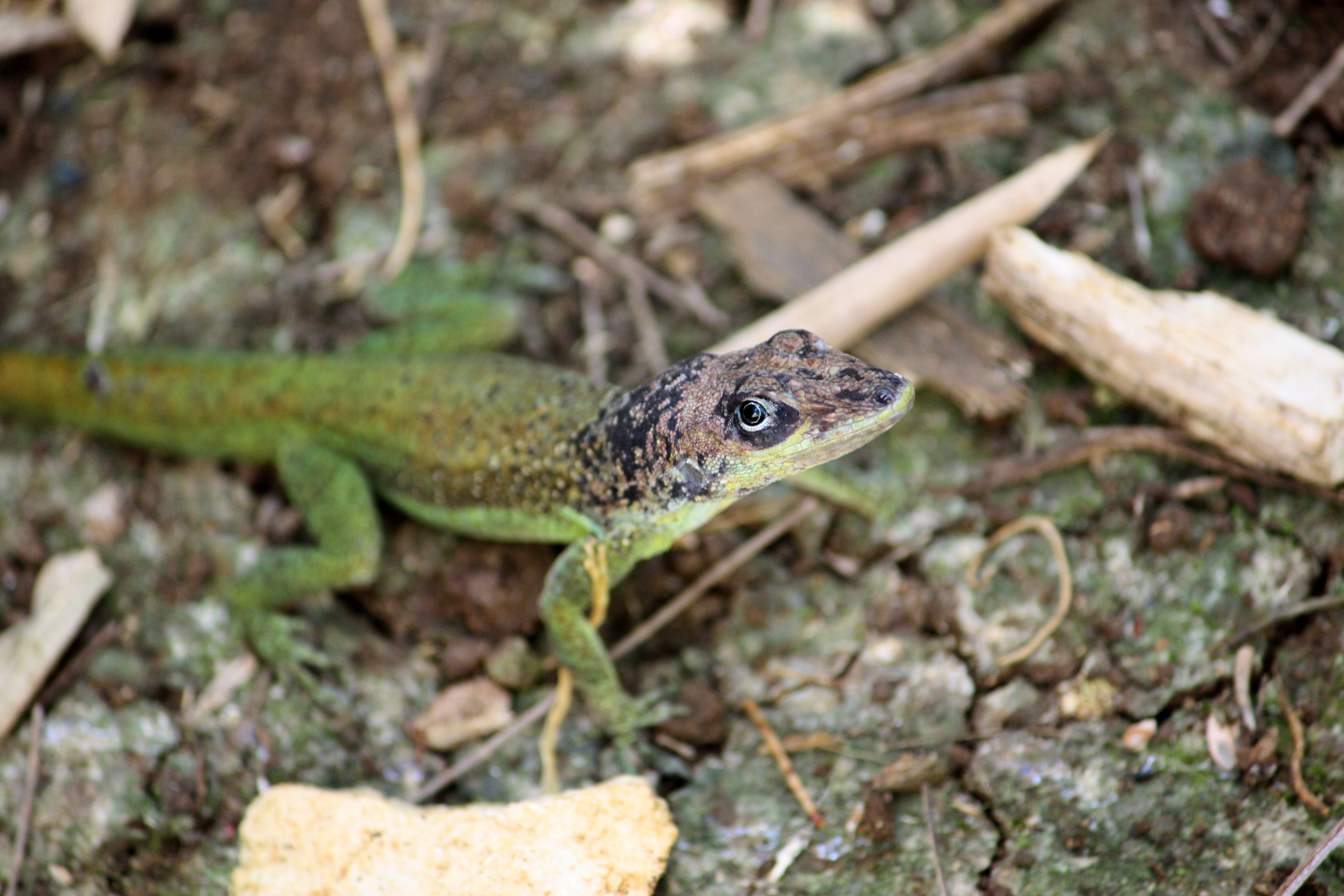
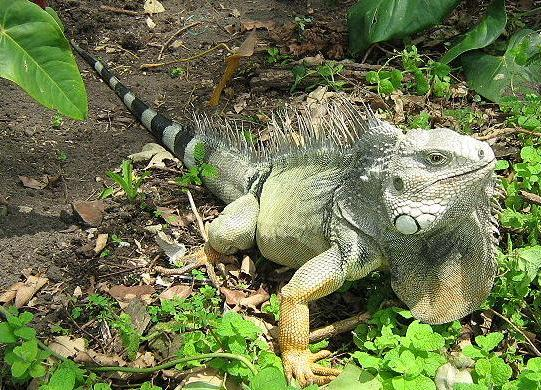
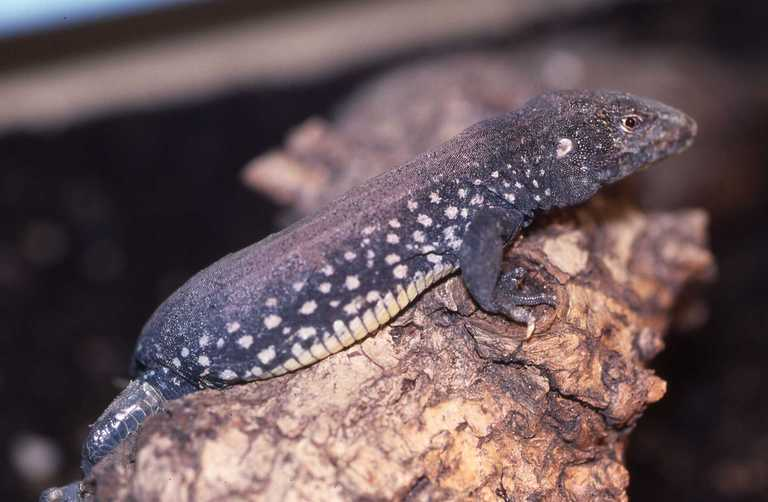
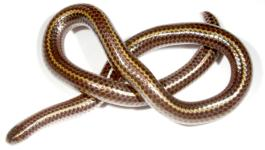
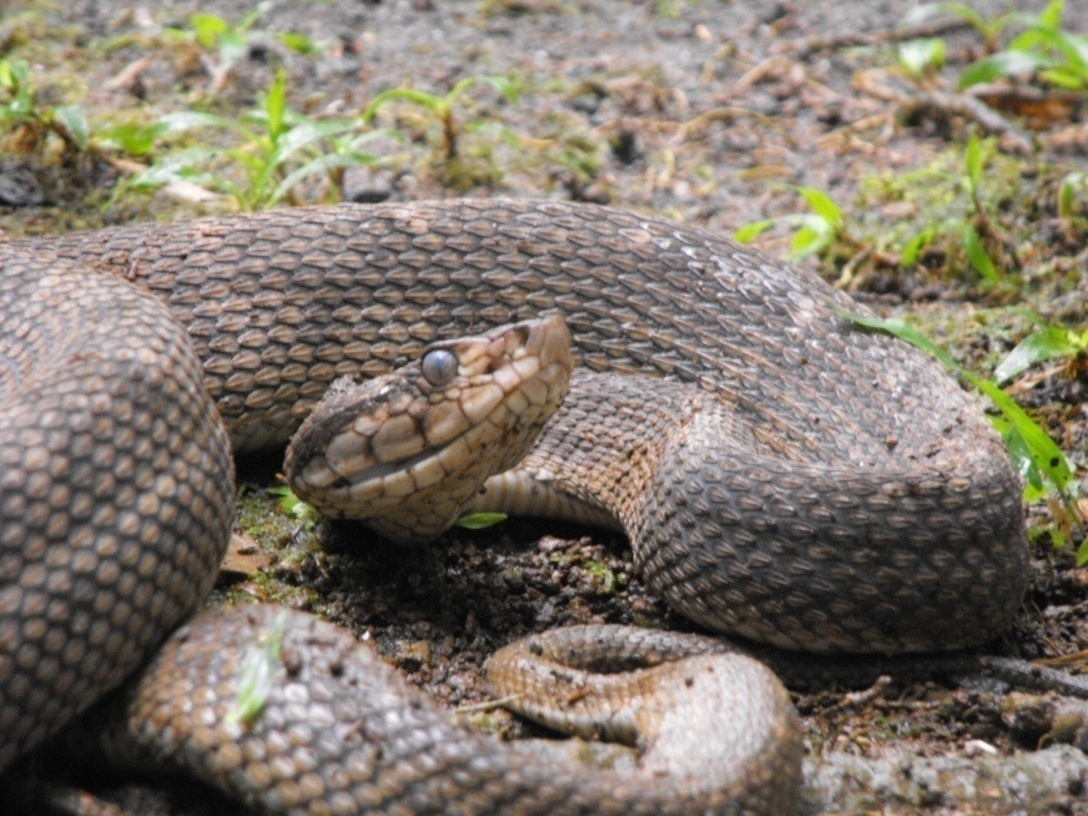
Geckos (Gekkonidae)
Species	Common name(s)	Notes	Image
Hemidactylus mabouia	House gecko	Introduced.
Hemidactylus palaichthus	Antilles leaf-toed gecko	Restricted to offshore islands of Maria Major and Dennery Island.
Sphaerodactylus microlepis	Little-scaled least gecko
Sphaerodactylus vincenti	Vincent's least gecko	Regional endemic.
Thecadactylus rapicauda	Turnip-tailed gecko
Iguanas and anolids (Iguanidae)
Species	Common name(s)	Notes	Image
Anolis extremus	Barbados anole	Regional endemic. Introduced from Barbados. Restricted to the area around the capital, Castries.
Anolis luciae	St. Lucia anole, Saint Lucian anole	Endemic. Widespread.
Anolis wattsi	Watts' anole	Regional endemic. Introduced. Restricted to the area around the capital, Castries.
Iguana iguana	Green iguana, common iguana
Whiptails (Teiidae)
Species	Common name(s)	Notes	Image
Cnemidophorus vanzoi	St Lucia whiptail, Vanzo's whiptail	Vulnerable. Endemic. The only Cnemidophorus species found in the Caribbean. Extirpated from the main island and now only native to the small islets of Maria Major and Maria Minor, with fewer than 1000 individuals estimated. A third population has been established on nearby Praslin Island through translocation.
Microteiids (Gymnophthalmidae)
Species	Common name(s)	Notes	Image
Gymnophthalmus pleii	Martinique spectacled tegu	Regional endemic.
Skinks (Scincidae)
Species	Common name(s)	Notes	Image
†Alinea luciae	Saint Lucia skink	Endemic, extinct since the early 20th century.
Worm snakes (Typhlopidae)
Species	Common name(s)	Notes	Image
Leptotyphlops breuili	St. Lucia threadsnake	Endemic. First described as a separate species in 2008.
Boas (Boidae)
Species	Common name(s)	Notes	Image
Boa constrictor	Boa constrictor
Colubrids (Colubridae)
Species	Common name(s)	Notes	Image
†Clelia errabunda	Underwood's mussurana	Endemic, extinct since the late 19th century.
Liophis ornatus	St Lucia racer	Endangered. Endemic. Probably extirpated from the main island; present on Maria Major but rare.
Vipers (Viperidae)
Species	Common name(s)	Notes	Image
Bothrops caribbaeus	Saint Lucia lancehead, fer-de-lance	Endemic. Distributed in lowlands, commonly found along river valleys.
