= Clelia scytalina =

Conservation status
- Least Concern (IUCN 3.1)

Scientific classification
- Kingdom: Animalia
- Phylum: Chordata
- Class: Reptilia
- Order: Squamata
- Suborder: Serpentes
- Family: Colubridae
- Genus: Clelia
- Species: C. scytalina

Binomial name
- Clelia scytalina (Cope, 1867)

Synonyms
- Scolecophis scytalinus Cope, 1867; Oxyrhopus proximus Bocourt, 1897; Clelia clelia immaculata H.M. Smith, 1942; Clelia scytalina Stuart, 1963

Species of snake

Clelia scytalina, commonly known as the Mexican snake eater or zopilota de altura (highland mussarana), is a species of snake in the family Colubridae. The species is endemic to the New World.

== Geographic range ==
Clelia scytalina is found in Southern Mexico, Central America, and Colombia.

== Description ==
The head of C. scytalina is somewhat distinct from the neck. The eye is moderate in size, with a vertically elliptical pupil. The body is cylindrical, and the tail is moderately long.

The smooth dorsal scales are arranged in 17 rows at midbody.

The coloration of juveniles is completely different from that of adults. Juveniles have a black head, a yellow or white nuchal crossband (collar), and a red body. Juveniles are often mistaken for coral snakes and killed. Adults are uniform bluish black dorsally, and cream-colored ventrally.

== Habitat ==
Clelia scytalina is a terrestrial animal which inhabits old-growth and second-growth forests and their borders. Occasionally it is found in open areas in submontane and montane life zones.

== Diet ==
Like other species of mussurana, C. scytalina is known to feed on other snakes.

== Reproduction ==
Clelia scytalina is oviparous (egg-laying).
