= Underwood's mussurana =

Conservation status
- Extinct (IUCN 3.1)

Scientific classification
- Kingdom: Animalia
- Phylum: Chordata
- Class: Reptilia
- Order: Squamata
- Suborder: Serpentes
- Family: Colubridae
- Genus: Clelia
- Species: †C. errabunda

Binomial name
- †Clelia errabunda Underwood, 1993

Extinct species of snake

Underwood's mussurana or Saint Lucia cribo (Clelia errabunda) is an extinct species of snake in the family Dipsadidae. The species was formerly endemic to the Caribbean island of Saint Lucia. It was originally thought to belong to the species Clelia clelia. Like other species of mussurana, it is known to have fed on other snakes; one museum specimen is preserved in the act of swallowing a Bothrops species. Its extinction is believed to have been caused by human activity.

It was mistakenly recorded as present on Dominica due to a cataloging error.
