= Alinea =

Alinea may refer to:

- Alinea (restaurant) in Chicago
- In several languages : an indenting or a pilcrow, from the Latin a linea, referring to ¶ which indicates a new paragraph
- Alinea (lizard), a small genus of lizards
