= Alinea lanceolata =

Conservation status
- Critically endangered, possibly extinct (IUCN 3.1)

Scientific classification
- Kingdom: Animalia
- Phylum: Chordata
- Class: Reptilia
- Order: Squamata
- Family: Scincidae
- Genus: Alinea
- Species: A. lanceolata

Binomial name
- Alinea lanceolata (Cope, 1863)

Species of lizard

Alinea lanceolata, the Barbados skink, is a species of skink found in Barbados. It is classified by the IUCN as being critically endangered, possibly extinct. Last recorded in 1889, it was probably driven to extinction by invasive mammalian predators, especially mongoose. It has only ever been documented from a small region on the south of Barbados, consisting of the localities of Greame Hall Swamp and Chancery Lane spread 8 km (5.0 mi) apart.

== Taxonomy ==
The Barbados skink was formally described by the American naturalist Edward Drinker Cope in 1863 as Mabuia lanceolata based on a specimen from Barbados. It was subsequently transferred to the genus Alinea. The specific epithet means "spear-like" and refers to the shape of the skink's head. It has the common name Barbados skink.

== Distribution and habitat ==
The skink is endemic to Barbados, where it has only been recorded from two localities in the far south of the island: Greame Hall Swamp and Chancery Lane. These two areas are only separated by a distance of around 8 km (5.0 mi).

== Conservation ==
The Barbados skink is classified by the IUCN as being critically endangered, possibly extinct. It was last recorded in 1889, despite inhabiting a densely populated island and several surveys searching for the species, and is thus considered to likely have gone extinct. The presence of invasive mongooses, as well as other mammalian predators such as black rats, is probably the main reason for the extinction of the species. The other contributing factor to its disappearance is habitat loss because of agricultural activities and urban expansion on Barbados. Barbados has had several native species go extinct due to invasive predators. On other Caribbean islands, skinks have survived the introduction of predators via remnant populations on satellite islands, but Barbados has one only satellite island, where this skink has never been documented.
