= Clelia plumbea =

Scientific classification
- Kingdom: Animalia
- Phylum: Chordata
- Class: Reptilia
- Order: Squamata
- Suborder: Serpentes
- Family: Colubridae
- Genus: Clelia
- Species: C. plumbea

Binomial name
- Clelia plumbea (Wied-Neuwied, 1820)

Synonyms
- Coluber plumbeus Wied-Neuwied, 1820; Brachyruton plumbeum — A.M.C. Duméril, Bibron & A.H.A. Duméril, 1854; Oxyrhopus plumbeus — Günther, 1858; Clelia plumbea — Zaher, 1996

Species of snake

Clelia plumbea is a species of rear-fanged snake in the family Dipsadidae. The species is endemic to South America, where it can be found in Brazil and Paraguay.

== Distribution ==
Clelia plumbea is widely distributed throughout Brazil and Paraguay, and can be found in the Amazon rainforest, Cerrado, and Atlantic Forest ecoregions. The type locality is from a small area north of Cabo Frio in the state of Rio de Janeiro.
