= Clelia langeri =

Conservation status
- Least Concern (IUCN 3.1)

Scientific classification
- Kingdom: Animalia
- Phylum: Chordata
- Class: Reptilia
- Order: Squamata
- Suborder: Serpentes
- Family: Colubridae
- Genus: Clelia
- Species: C. langeri

Binomial name
- Clelia langeri Reichle & Embert, 2005

Species of snake

Clelia langeri is a species of snake in the subfamily Dipsadinae of the family Colubridae. The species is endemic to Bolivia.

== Etymology ==
The specific name, langeri, is in honor of German-born Brother Andres Langer, a Dominican friar who is a missionary in Pampagrande, Bolivia.

== Description ==
Unlike other members of its genus, C. langeri has two loreal scales instead of one. It also differs by having 21 rows of dorsal scales in the region of its neck.

== Geographic range ==
Clelia langeri is found in the Bolivian departments of Chuquisaca, Cochabamba, and Santa Cruz.

== Habitat ==
The preferred natural habitat of C. langeri is forest, at altitudes of 715–1,500 m (2,346–4,921 ft).

== Behavior ==
Clelia langeri is primarily terrestrial, but also sometimes arboreal.

== Diet ==
Clelia langeri is known to prey upon snakes and small mammals. It is possible that it also may prey upon frogs as do other species in the genus Clelia.

== Reproduction ==
Clelia langeri is oviparous.
