= Clelia hussami =

Conservation status
- Least Concern (IUCN 3.1)

Scientific classification
- Kingdom: Animalia
- Phylum: Chordata
- Class: Reptilia
- Order: Squamata
- Suborder: Serpentes
- Family: Colubridae
- Genus: Clelia
- Species: C. hussami

Binomial name
- Clelia hussami Morato, Franco & Sanches, 2003

Species of snake

Clelia hussami is a species of snake in the subfamily Dipsadinae of the family Colubridae. The species is native to the South Region of Brazil, where it is found in the forests and savannas in the Brazilian states of Paraná, Rio Grande do Sul, and Santa Catarina.

== Etymology ==
The specific name, hussami, is in honor of Brazilian herpetologist Hussam Zaher.

== Habitat ==
The preferred natural habitats of C. hussami are forest and savanna, at altitudes of 800–1,100 m (2,600–3,600 ft).

== Description ==
A medium-sized snake, C. hussami may attain a snout-to-vent length (SVL) of 108 cm (43 in).

== Reproduction ==
C. hussami is oviparous.
