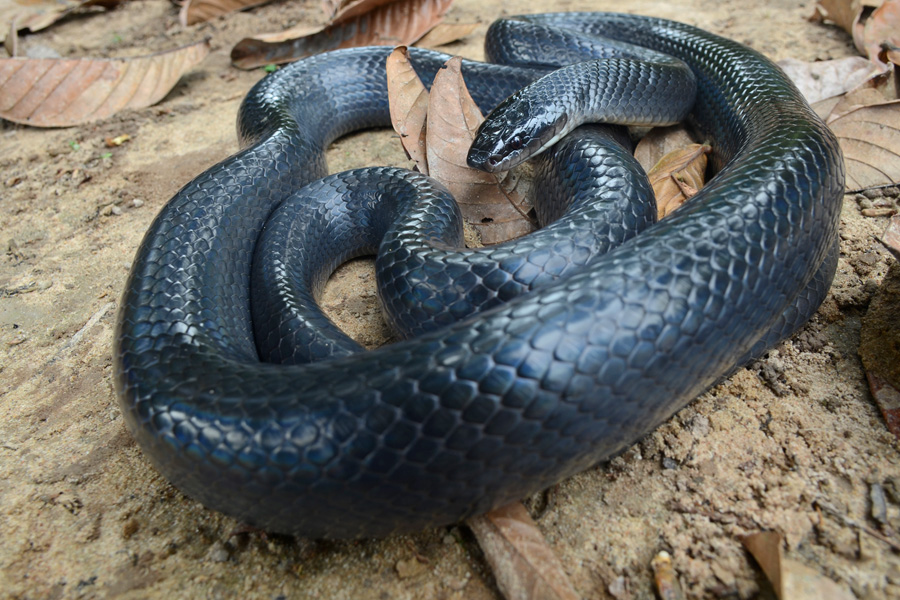

Scientific classification
- Kingdom: Animalia
- Phylum: Chordata
- Class: Reptilia
- Order: Squamata
- Suborder: Serpentes
- Family: Colubridae
- Subfamily: Dipsadinae
- Genus: Clelia; Fitzinger, 1826

Species
- Seven, see text

= Clelia (snake) =

Mussurana

Genus of snakes

Clelia is a genus of snakes, one of three genera containing species with the common name mussurana or musurana (Portuguese: muçurana). Clelia is a genus of large snakes in the subfamily Dipsadidae of the family Colubridae. The genus is native to Central America and South America, and species of Clelia are found from southern Mexico to Brazil. They specialize in ophiophagy, i.e., they attack and eat other snakes. Seven species are recognized as being valid. They have other popular names in various countries, such as zopilota in Central America and cribo on some Caribbean islands (though they are not related to Drymarchon).

== Species ==
The genus Clelia contains the following species which are currently recognized as being valid.

- Clelia clelia (Daudin, 1803) – black mussurana, windward cribo
- Clelia equatoriana (Amaral, 1924) – equatorial mussarana
- Clelia errabunda Underwood, 1993 – Underwood's mussurana, Saint Lucia cribo (extinct)
- Clelia hussami Morato, Franco & Sanches, 2003
- Clelia langeri Reichle & Embert, 2005
- Clelia plumbea (Wied, 1820)
- Clelia scytalina (Cope, 1867) – Mexican snake eater

Nota bene: A binomial authority in parentheses indicates that the species was originally described in a genus other than Clelia.

== Description ==
Mussuranas have an average total length (including tail) of about 1.5 m (4.9 ft), but may grow up to about 2.5 m (8.2 ft). When young, the dorsal color is light pink, which becomes lead-blue when adult. The ventral color is whitish yellow. They have 10 to 15 teeth at the front of the upper jaw, which are followed, after a space, by two enlarged grooved teeth at the back of the mouth (opisthoglyphous teeth) which they use to grasp the head of the attacked snake and push it into the gullet. Then they coil around the prey, killing it by constriction (this is the reason these species are called pseudoboas). Ingestion of the whole body follows. The long body of the ingested snake is compressed as a wave in order to fit into the mussuranas' gastrointestinal system.

== Reproduction ==
Mussaranas are oviparous.

== Venom ==
Although mussuranas are rear-fanged and produce a mild venom, these snakes pose no danger to humans. Even when handled they usually do not bite. Very few envenomations have been reported and they were not fatal. Mussuranas are immune to the venom of the snakes they feed upon, particularly the smaller Central and South American pit vipers of the genus Bothrops. They are not immune to the venom of the coral snake, though. In the absence of other snakes, mussuranas can feed also on small mammals. It has been reported that at least some captive specimens will accept only live snakes as prey.

== Habitat and behavior ==
The preferred habitat of mussuranas is dense ground-level vegetation. They are diurnal.

== Conservation ==
In some regions, farmers keep mussuranas as pets in order to keep their living environment clear of pit vipers, which claim annually a large number of deaths of domestic animals, like cattle. In the 1930s a Brazilian plan to breed and release large numbers of mussuranas for the control of pit vipers was tried but did not work. The Butantan Institute in São Paulo, which specializes in the production of antivenins, erected a statue of Clelia clelia as its symbol and a tribute to its usefulness in combating venomous snake bites. Mussuranas' immunity to bothropic venom was studied by the Brazilian scientist Vital Brazil in the 1920s. Mussuranas are increasingly rare due to the disappearance of their prey and have disappeared in many habitats.
