= Clelia equatoriana =

Conservation status
- Least Concern (IUCN 3.1)

Scientific classification
- Kingdom: Animalia
- Phylum: Chordata
- Class: Reptilia
- Order: Squamata
- Suborder: Serpentes
- Family: Colubridae
- Genus: Clelia
- Species: C. equatoriana

Binomial name
- Clelia equatoriana (Amaral, 1924)

Synonyms
- Barbourina equatoriana Amaral, 1924; Clelia equatoriana J. Peters & Orejas-Miranda, 1970

Species of snake

Clelia equatoriana, commonly known as the equatorial mussarana, is a species of snake in the family Colubridae. The species is endemic to southeastern Central America and northwestern South America.

== Geographic range ==
C. equatoriana is found in Costa Rica, Panama, Colombia, and Ecuador.

== Description ==
C. equatoriana has 17 rows of dorsal scales at midbody (C. clelia has 19).
