= Pampagrande =

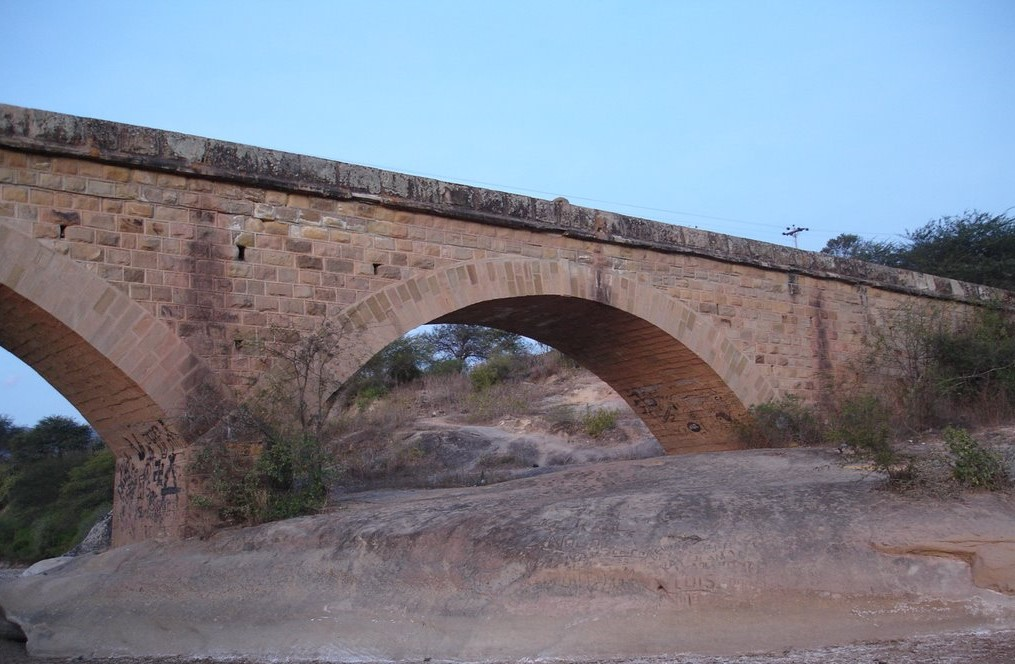

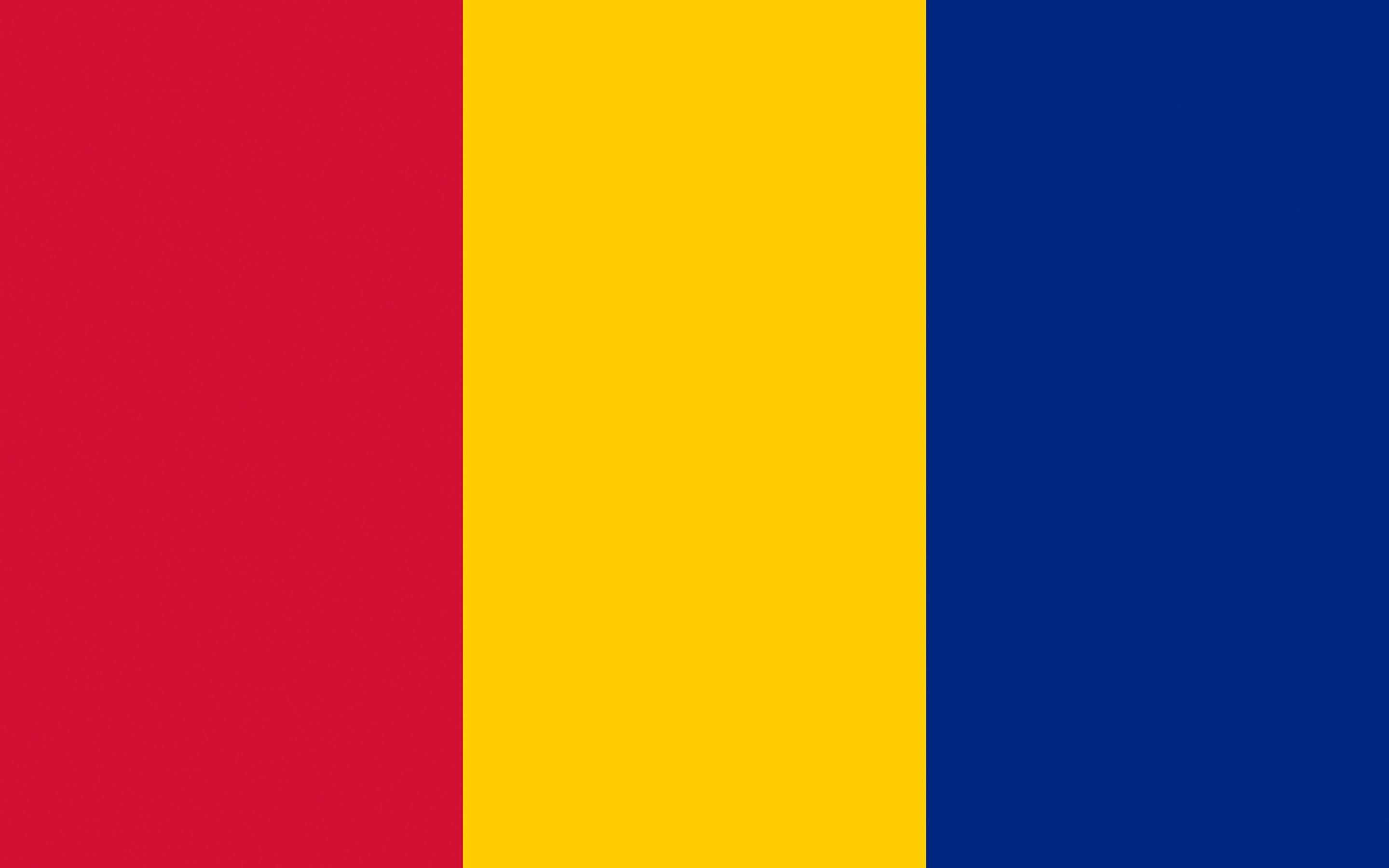
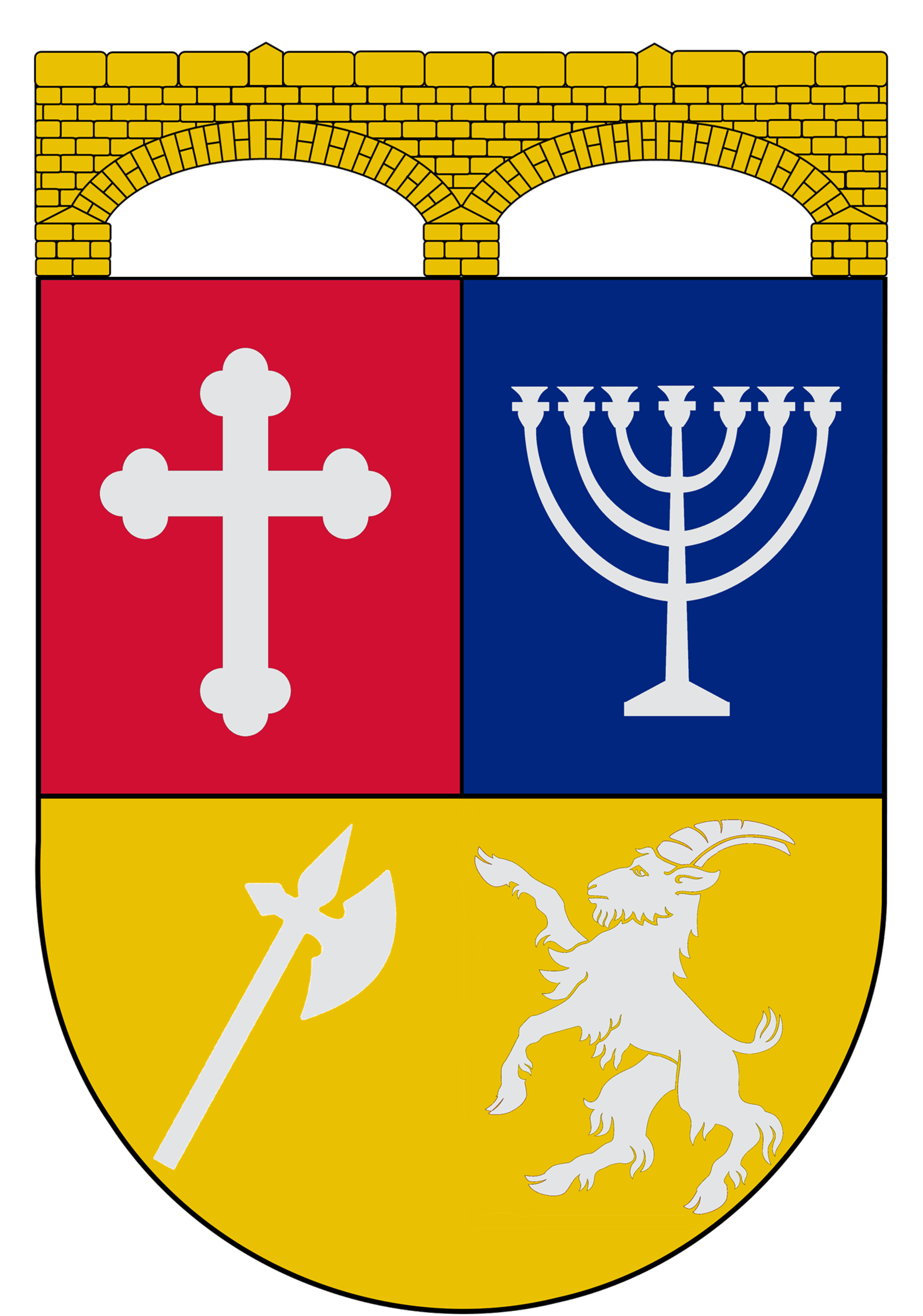
- Flag Coat of arms

- Location within Bolivia
- Coordinates: 18°5′50″S 64°6′58″W
- Country: Bolivia
- Elevation: 2,000 m (6,600 ft)
- Time zone: UTC-4 (BOT)

Pampagrande (also Hatun Pampa), Bolivia (18°05′50″S 64°06′58″W), lies about 200 kilometers to the West of Santa Cruz de la Sierra in the foothills of the Andes at an altitude of 2000 meters. This tiny community on a river of the same name suffers from financial hardship. The majority of the streets are made of earth, and until recently, there was no plumbing, telephone or electricity in the community. There are a handful of shops and one eating house in the town. Local farmers grow maize and watermelons where conditions allow. There is a splendid, masonry, single arch bridge over the Rio Pampagrande on the outskirts of town.

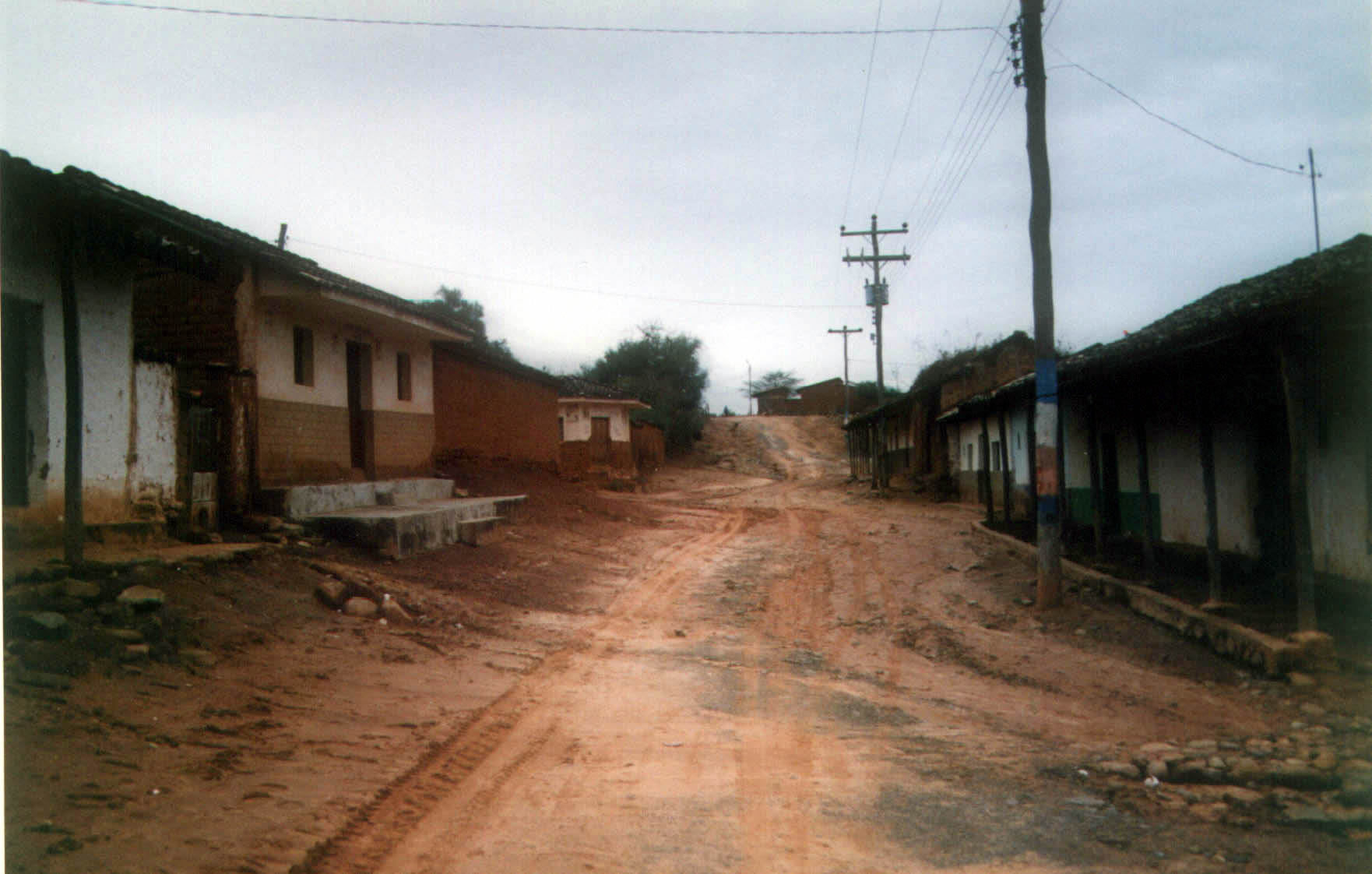
Only the streets around the Plaza are paved.

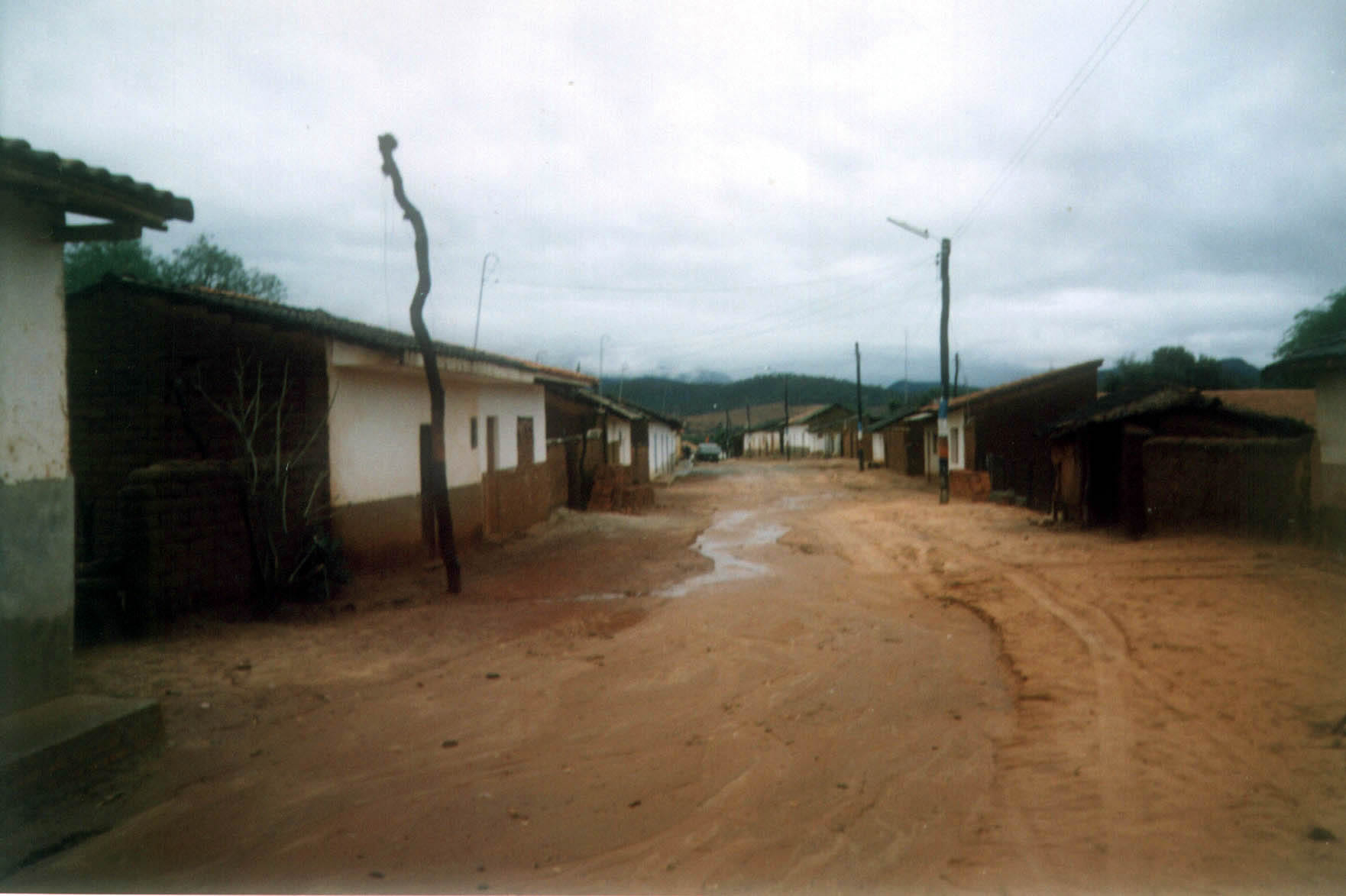
Pampagrande is not a wealthy part of Bolivia.

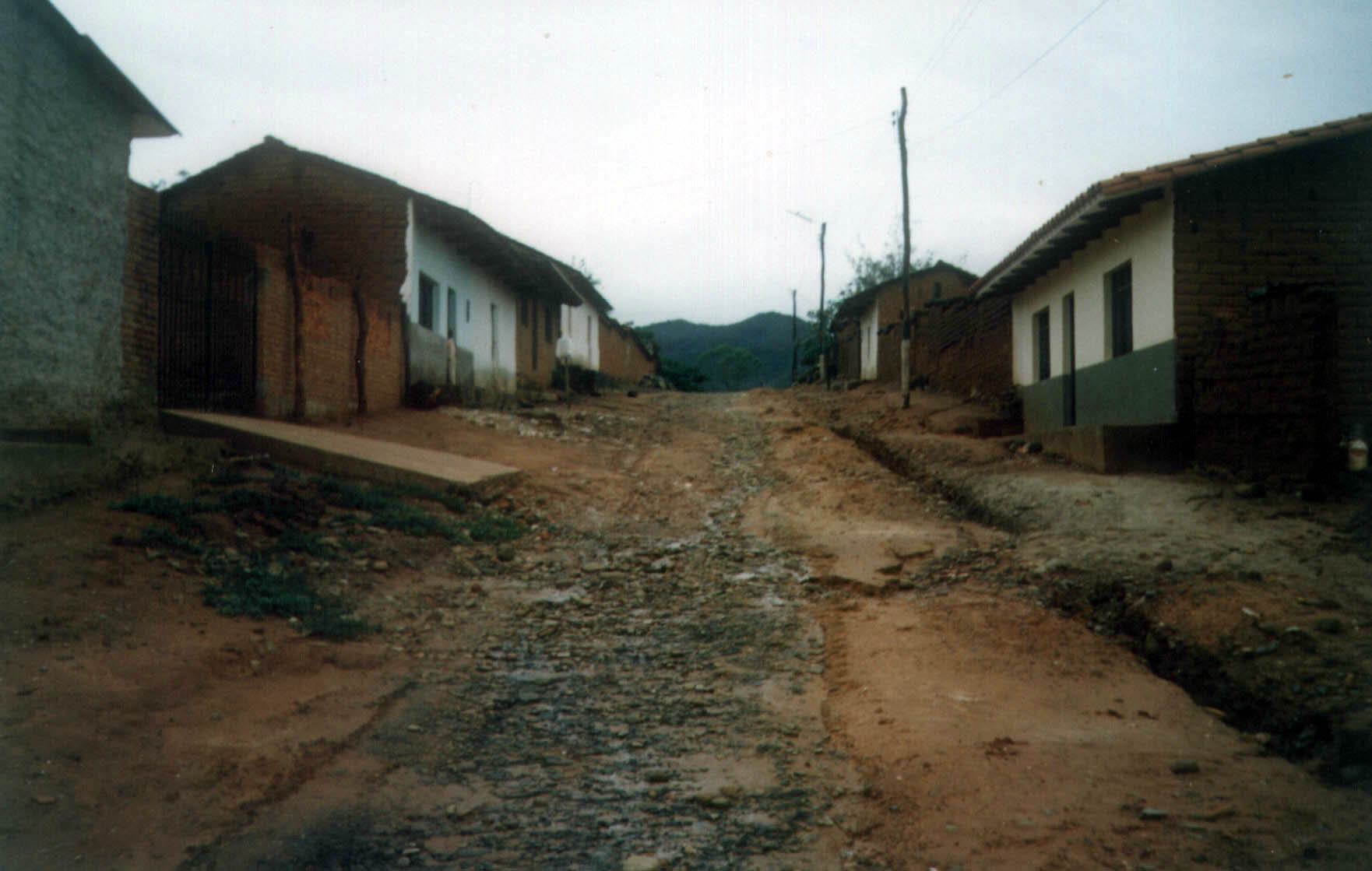
When it rains the streets become a sea of mud.

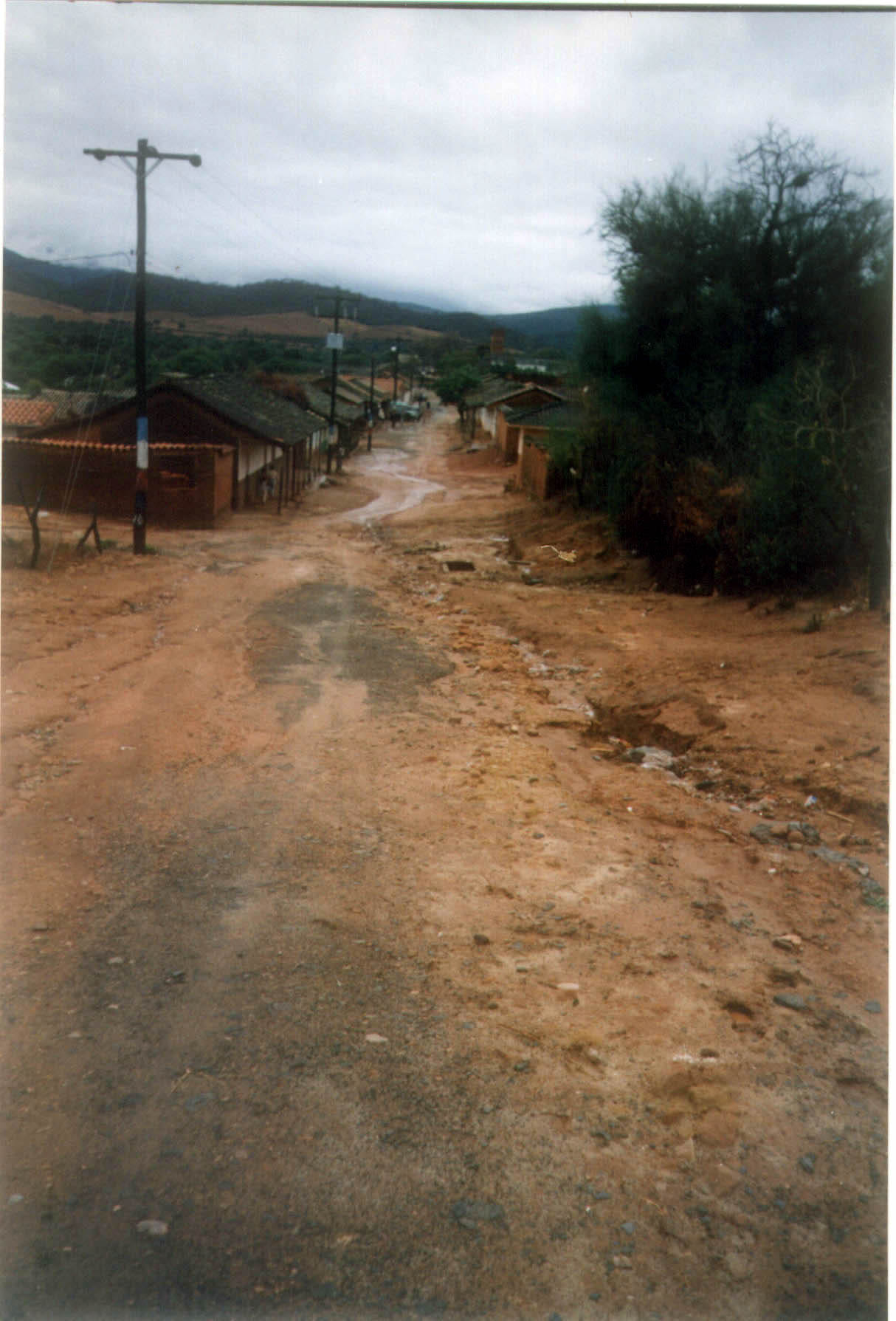
Few people here can afford a car or a truck. Just as well!

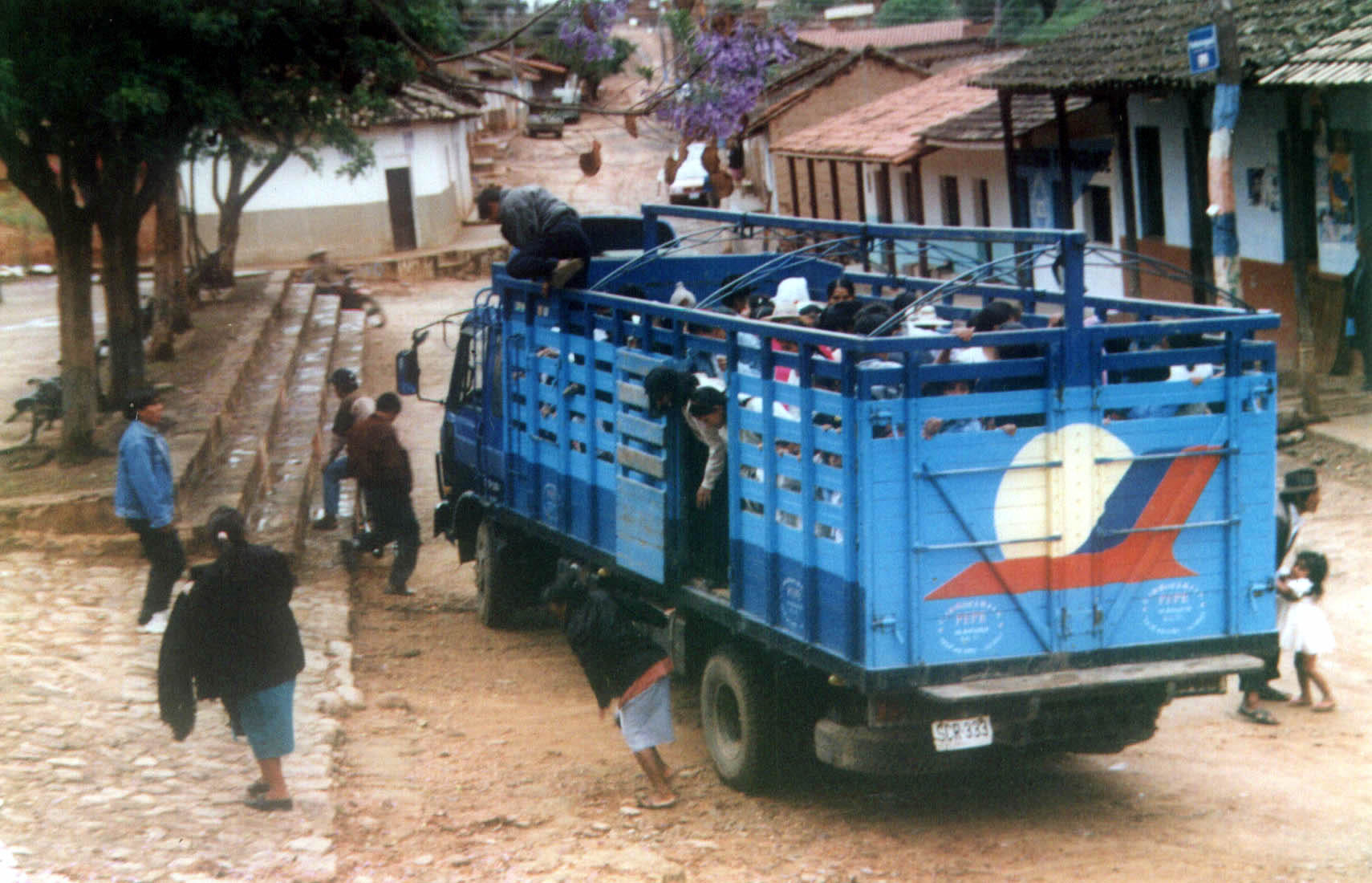
A wedding party arrives at the plaza Pampagrande. Time for celebration.

The surrounding country is termed "Medium Altitude Semi-desert".

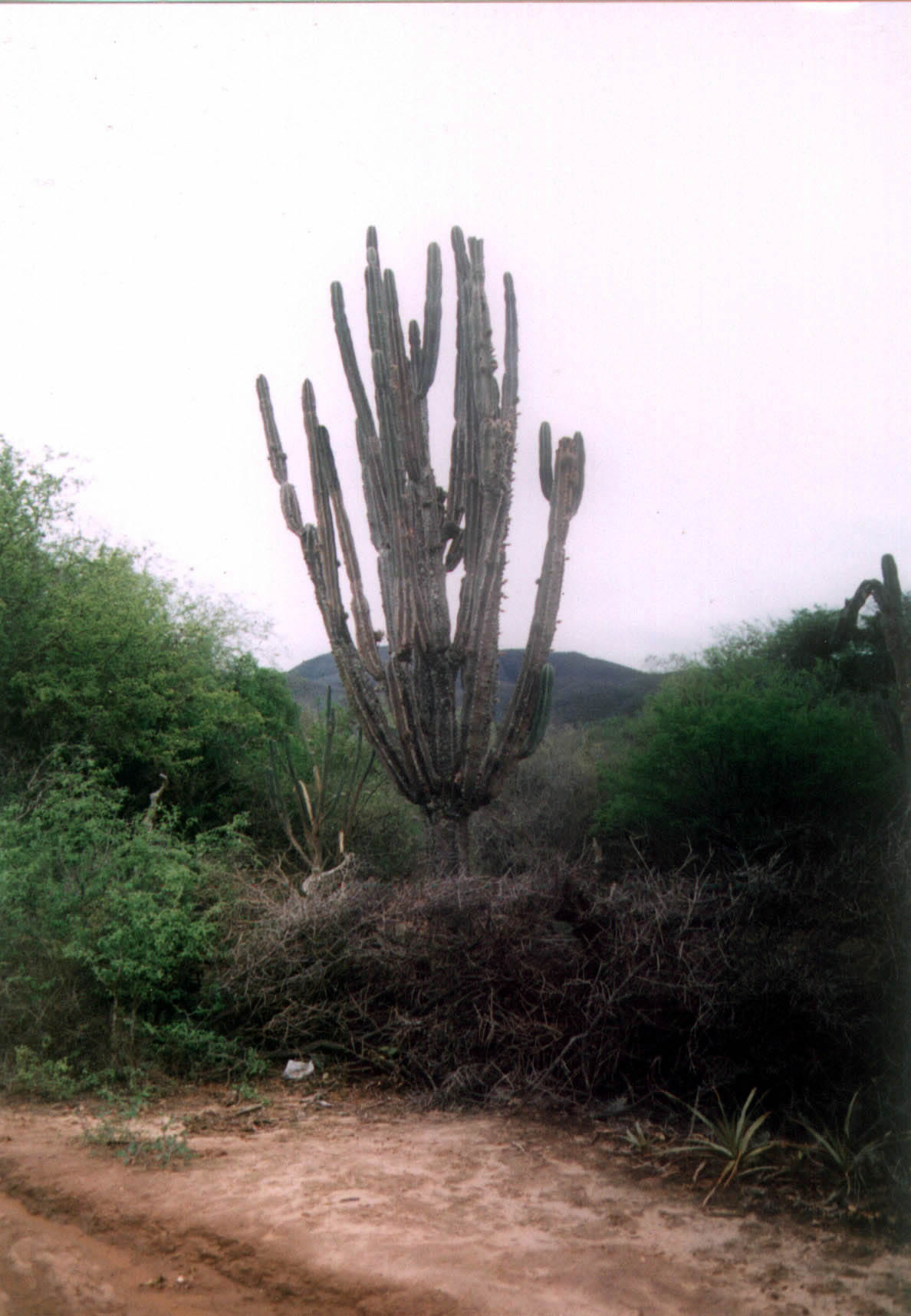
The arid landscape is dominated by giant cactus and thorny scrub.

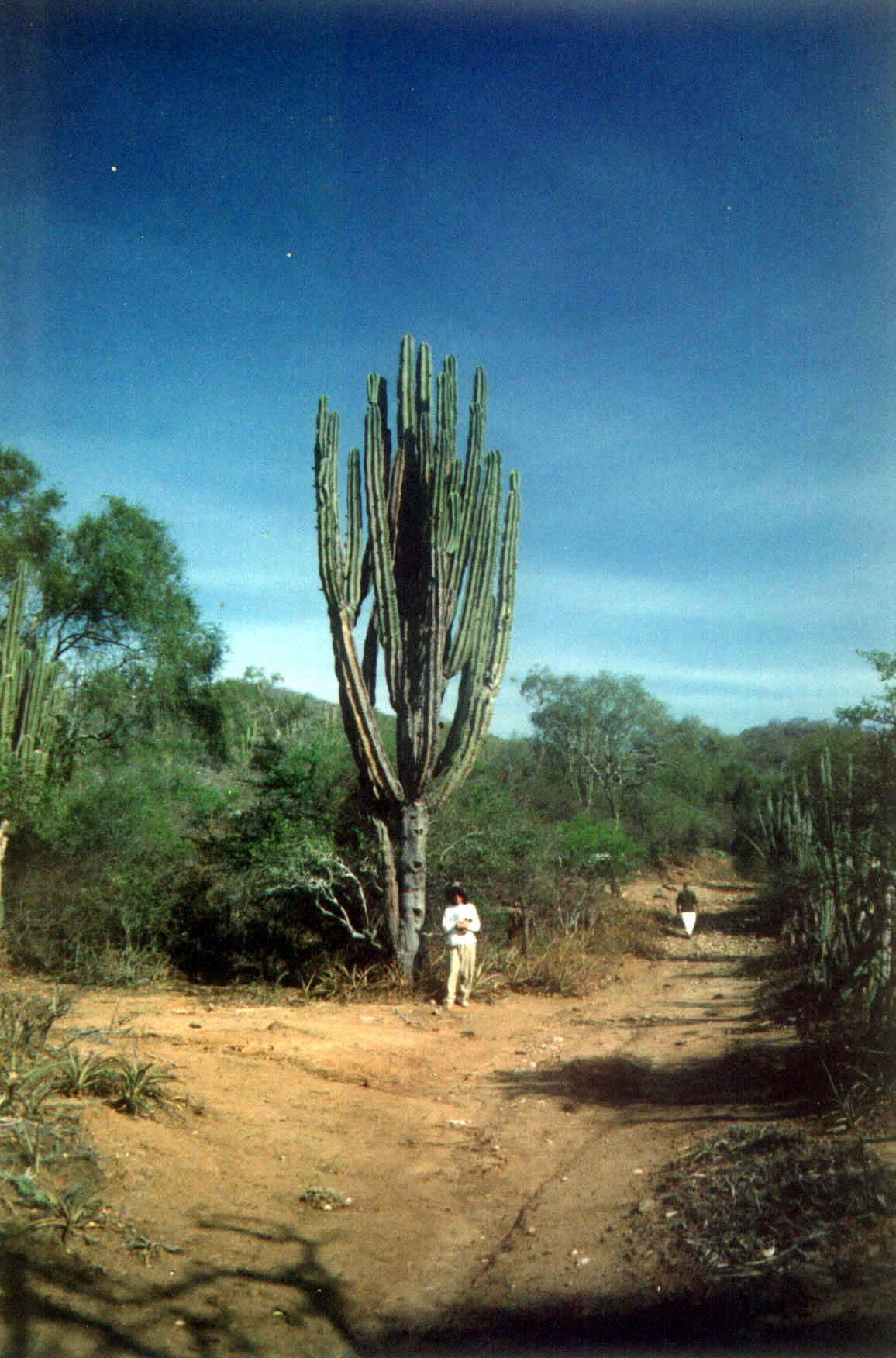
To wrest a living from the land around here is a Herculean task.

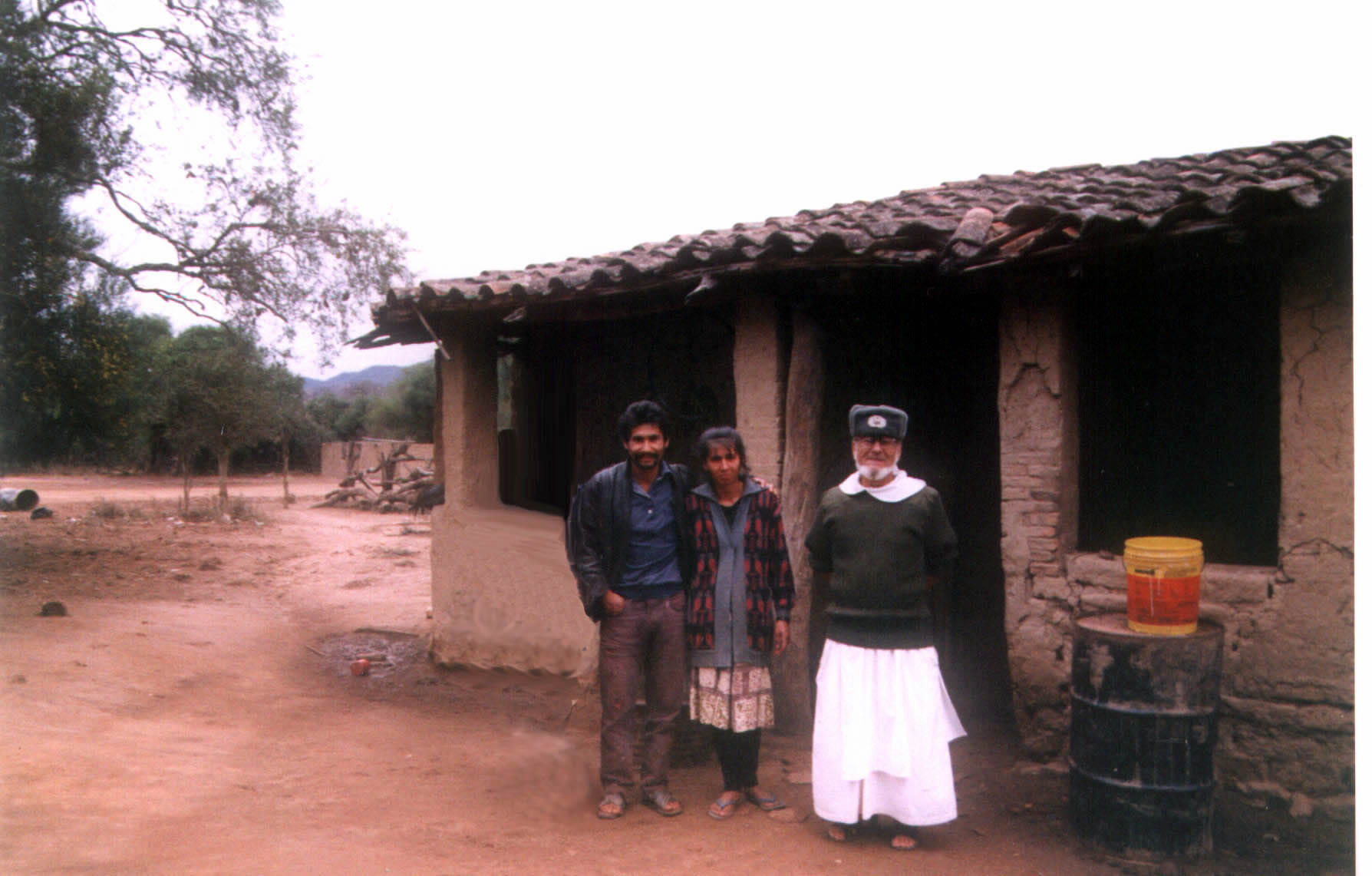
Nevertheless, for some there is no alternative. Campasinos near Pampagrande.

== Hermano Andres Langer ==
Locally famous is Hermano (Brother) Andres Langer a Dominican friar who originates from East Germany but has been resident in Pampagrande for thirty years. In that time he has raised the standard of living of his parishioners, obtaining the bridge, piped water, electricity and telephone for the town. There is still no drainage system, consequently all toilet facilities are of the "pit" variety.

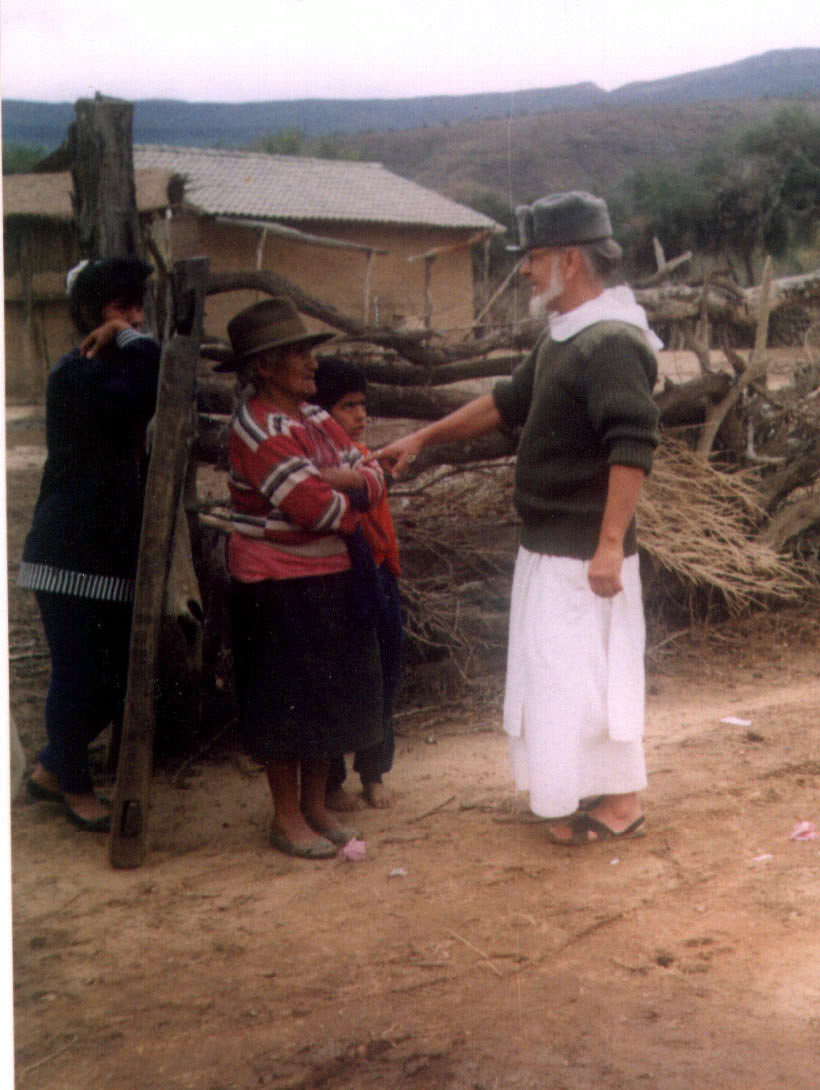
Hermano Andres, thirty year resident of Pampagrande, chats to one of his parishioners.

An expert in local ornithology (including the endemic red-fronted macaw) and herpetology (reptiles), Brother Langer is commemorated in the scientific name of a species of snake, Clelia langeri, which is endemic to Santa Cruz Department.

He often makes time to show visitors around as part of his travels about his parish. He also runs the only accommodation in town, a simple bunkhouse next to the church. There are no restaurants in town, just a simple "eating house" not far from the town centre. Shared taxis, locally known as "trufis", as well as coaches run several times daily between Santa Cruz and Pampagrande.
