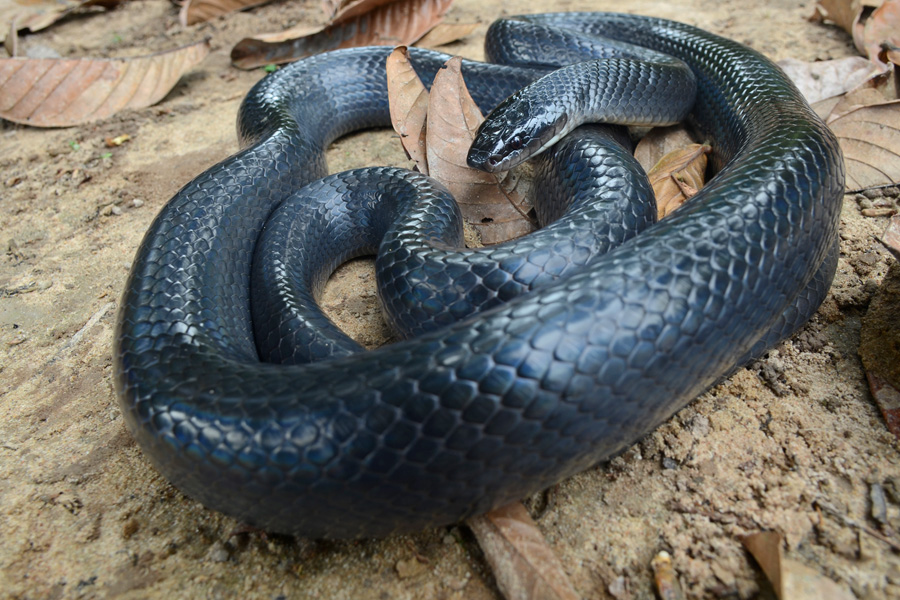

Conservation status
- Least Concern (IUCN 3.1)
- CITES Appendix II

Scientific classification
- Kingdom: Animalia
- Phylum: Chordata
- Class: Reptilia
- Order: Squamata
- Suborder: Serpentes
- Family: Colubridae
- Genus: Clelia
- Species: C. clelia

Binomial name
- Clelia clelia (Daudin, 1803)
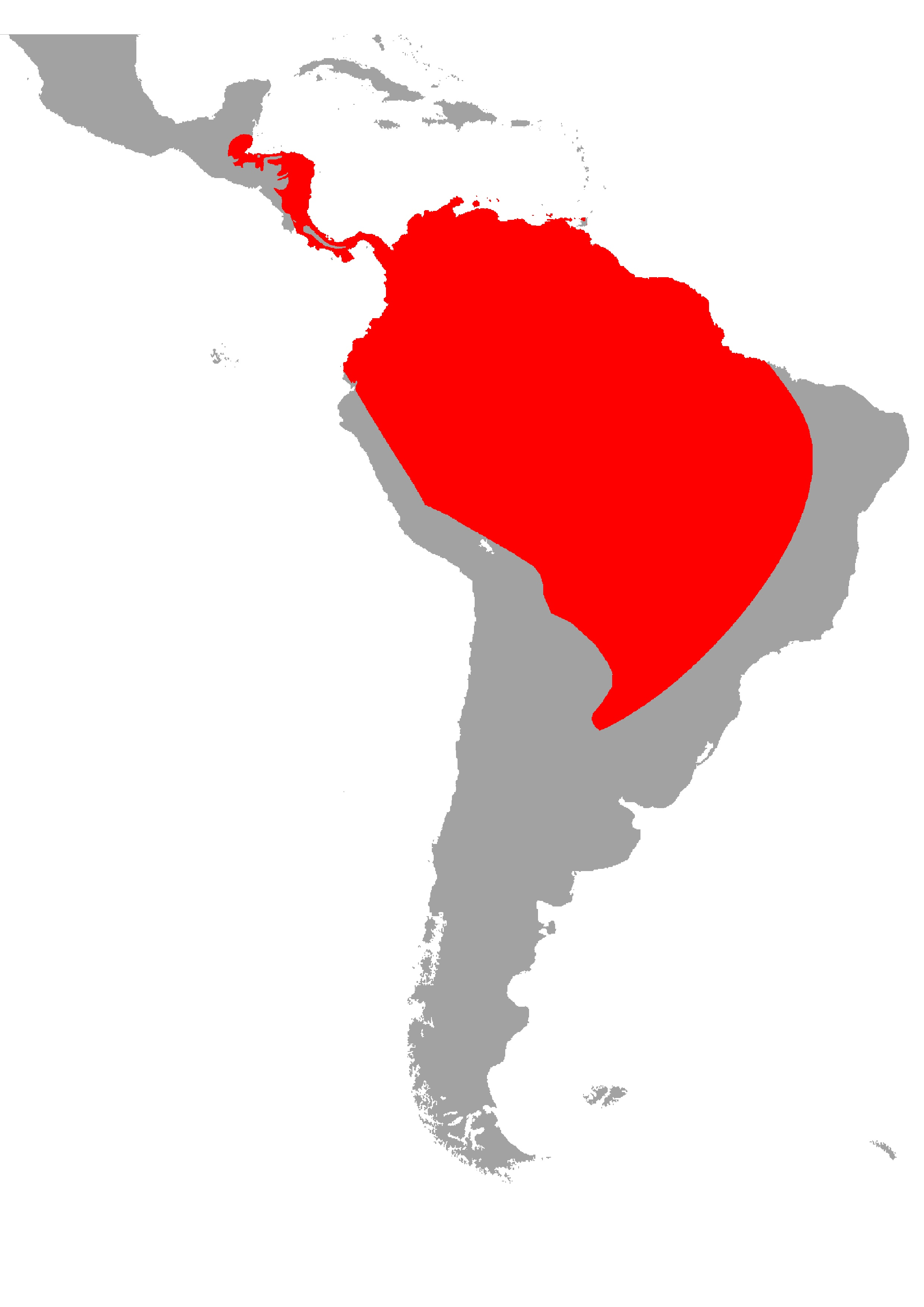

Synonyms
- Coluber clelia Daudin, 1803; Clelia daudinii Fitzinger, 1826; Brachyruton cloelia — A.M.C. Duméril, Bibron & A.H.A. Duméril, 1854; Oxyrhopus clelia — Cope, 1878; Clelia cloelia — Stejneger, 1913; Pseudoboa cloelia — Serié, 1921; Clelia clelia — Dunn, 1944

= Clelia clelia =

Species of snake

Clelia clelia, commonly known as the mussurana, black mussurana or windward cribo, is a species of snake in the subfamily Dipsadinae of the family Colubridae. The species is native to the New World.

== Etymology ==
The subspecific name, groomei, is in honor of Grenadian zoologist John R. Groome.

== Common names ==
Clelia clelia is called doi or duma in the Kwaza language of Rondônia, Brazil.

== Geographic range ==
Clelia clelia is found in Central America, South America, and the Lesser Antilles (including the island of Trinidad).

== Habitat ==
The preferred natural habitat of Clelia clelia is forest at altitudes from sea level to 1,500 m (4,900 ft).

== Description ==
Clelia clelia is a large snake. Adults may attain a snout-to-vent length (SVL) of 2.1 m (6.9 ft). Dorsally, adults are uniform black, gray, or olive-gray. Ventrally, adults are yellowish white. Juveniles are pale brown or red, with a black head and a yellow collar.

== Behavior ==
Clelia clelia is terrestrial. It is primarily nocturnal, but it is also sometimes diurnal.

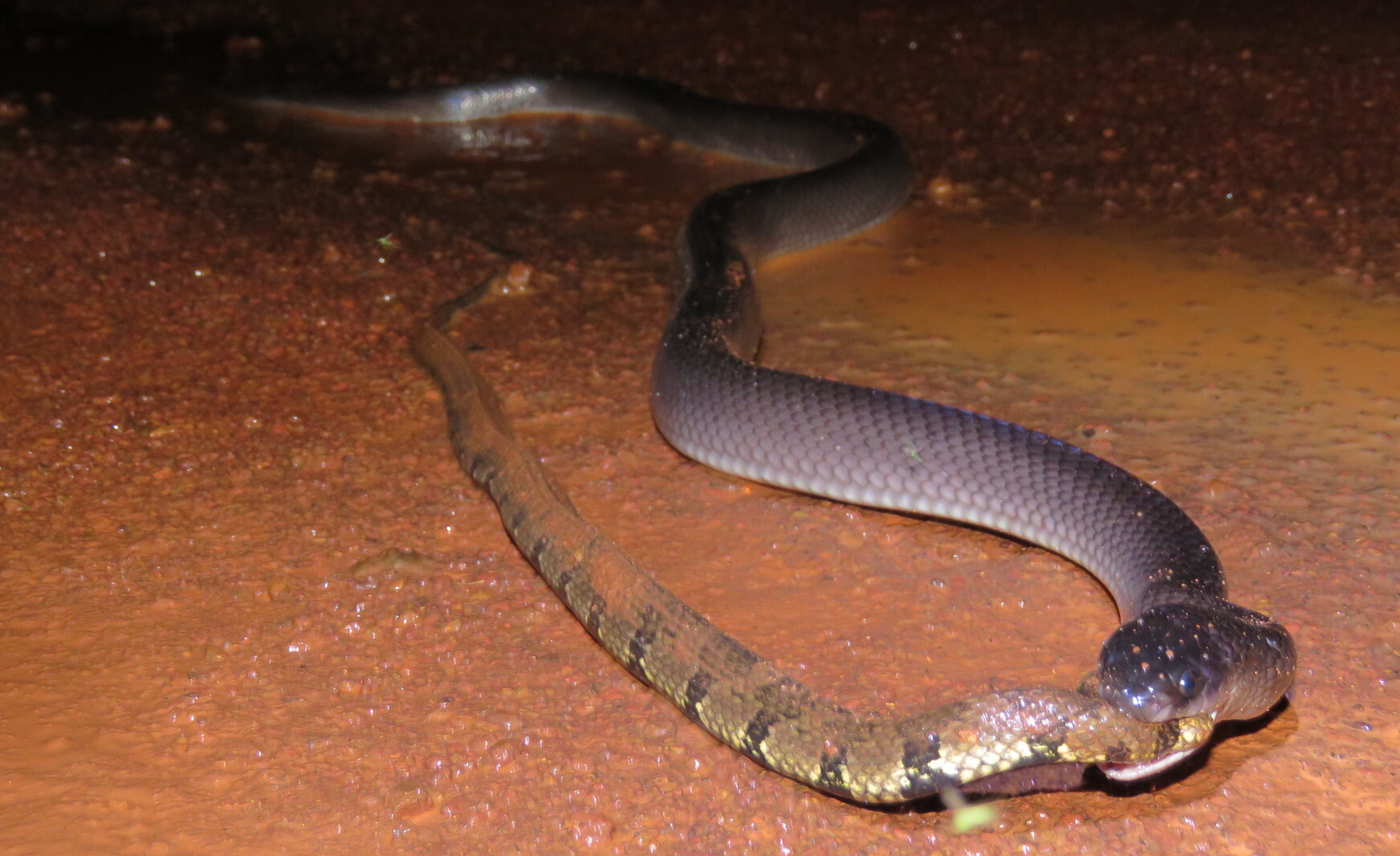
Eating a brown-banded water snake

== Diet ==
Clelia clelia is a generalized nocturnal predator with a strong degree of ophiophagy, including venomous snakes of the genera Bothriechis, Bothrops, Crotalus, Lachesis, Micrurus, and Porthidium.

In addition to snakes, Clelia clelia include the following prey items in its diet: lizards, snake eggs, opossums, rodents, birds, small mammals, and snails.

== Reproduction ==
Clelia clelia is oviparous.

== Subspecies ==
Clelia clelia has two subspecies, including the nominotypical subspecies, which are recognized as being valid.

- Clelia clelia clelia (Daudin, 1803)
- Clelia clelia groomei Greer, 1965

Nota bene: A binomial authority or trinomial authority in parentheses indicates that the species or subspecies was originally described in a genus other than Clelia.
