= Alinea (lizard) =

Scientific classification
- Kingdom: Animalia
- Phylum: Chordata
- Class: Reptilia
- Order: Squamata
- Family: Scincidae
- Subfamily: Mabuyinae
- Genus: Alinea; Hedges & Conn, 2012

Species
- 2 species, see text

Genus of lizards

Alinea is a genus of skinks endemic to the Lesser Antilles. This genus may be extinct, as one species, A. luciae, is considered extinct by the IUCN Red List, while the other, A. lanceolata, is also feared extinct due to the lack of recent sightings, although potential refuges may exist. However, there is some controversy over whether Alinea is a separate genus or synonymous with Mabuya. If it is distinct, introduced predators like the Javan mongoose may have contributed to this genus's extinction.

== Species ==
The following 2 species, listed alphabetically by specific name, are recognized as being valid:

- Alinea lanceolata (Cope, 1862) – Barbados skink (possibly extinct)
- Alinea luciae (Garman, 1887) – Saint Lucia skink (extinct)

Nota bene: A binomial authority in parentheses indicates that the species was originally described in a genus other than Alinea.
