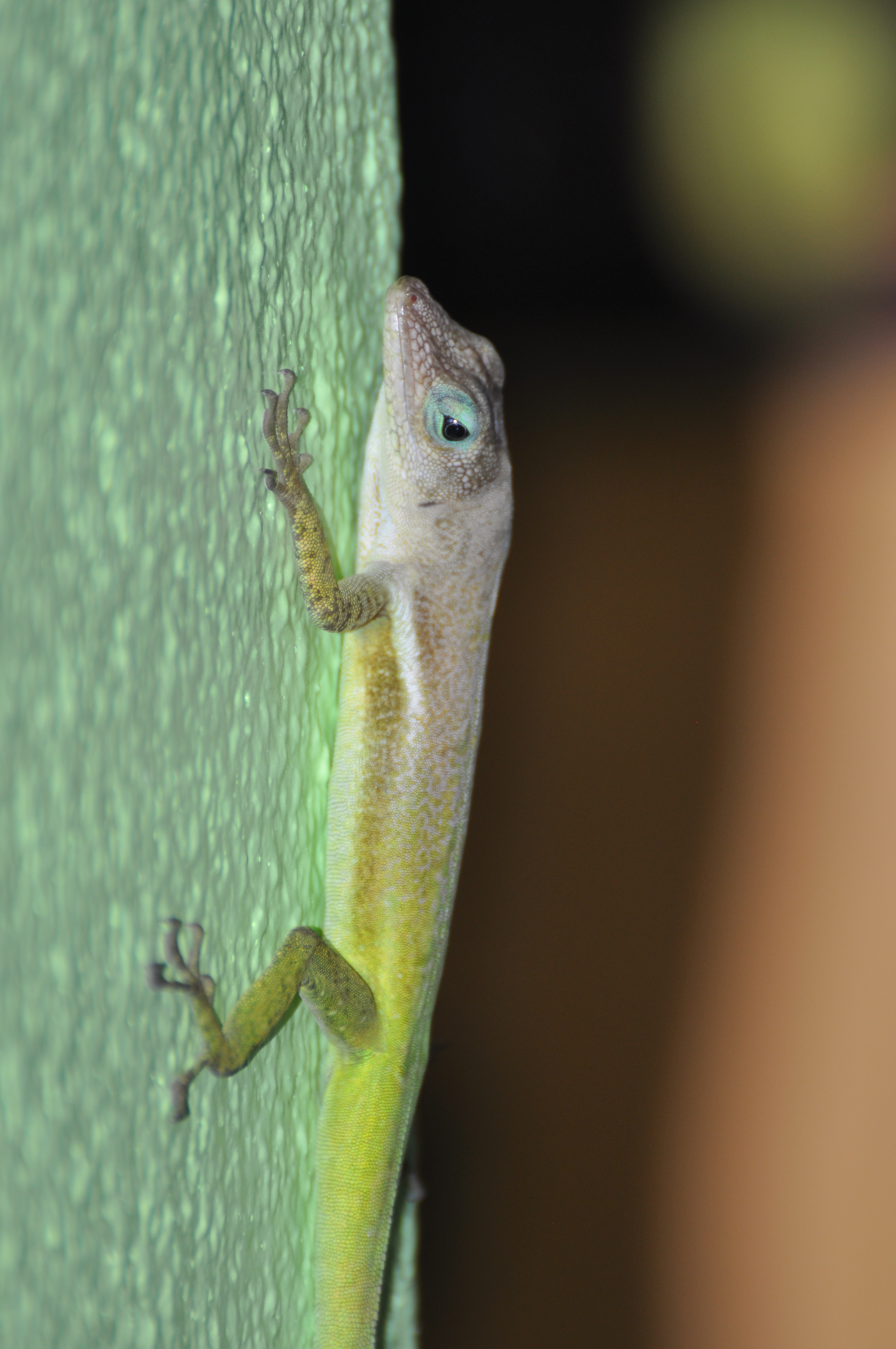

Conservation status
- Endangered (IUCN 3.1)

Scientific classification
- Kingdom: Animalia
- Phylum: Chordata
- Class: Reptilia
- Order: Squamata
- Suborder: Iguania
- Family: Dactyloidae
- Genus: Anolis
- Species: A. luciae

Binomial name
- Anolis luciae Garman, 1887

Synonyms
- Anolis luciae Garman, 1887; Anolis bimaculatus luciae — Underwood in E. Williams et al., 1959; Anolis trinitatis procuratoris Underwood, 1959; Anolis luciae — Schwartz & Henderson, 1991; Dactyloa luciae — Nicholson et al., 2012

= Anolis luciae =

St. Lucia anole

Species of lizard

Anolis luciae, also known commonly as the St. Lucia anole or the Saint Lucian anole, is a species of anole lizard in the family Dactyloidae. The species is endemic to Saint Lucia, an island-nation in the Caribbean Lesser Antilles.

== Etymology ==
The specific name, luciae, refers to the island of Saint Lucia.

== Geographic range ==
Anolis luciae is widespread on Saint Lucia and its offshore islets.

== Description ==
The coloration and markings of Anolis luciae vary. Its dorsal ground colour ranges from brown in drier habitats to bright green in wetter areas. Some populations have blue coloration on the sides, and the ventral surface may be white or yellowish. The area around the eye may be white, blue, or green. Males may be patternless or have reticulations or chevron patterns on the dorsal surface. Females are duller than males, and may have a mid-dorsal stripe or dark chevron markings.

== Habitat ==
The preferred natural habitat of Anolis luciae is forest, at altitudes from sea level to 700 m (2,300 ft), but it is also found in agricultural areas.

== Diet ==
Anolis luciae eats fruits and yams.

== Reproduction ==
Anolis luciae is oviparous.

== Invasive species ==
Anolis luciae co-exists on Saint Lucia with two introduced anole species: A. extremus and A. wattsi. A. luciae appears to be resisting competition, and the two invasive species are restricted to areas around the capital, Castries.

== See also ==
- List of Anolis lizards
