= Alinea luciae =

Conservation status
- Extinct (IUCN 3.1)

Scientific classification
- Kingdom: Animalia
- Phylum: Chordata
- Class: Reptilia
- Order: Squamata
- Suborder: Scinciformata
- Infraorder: Scincomorpha
- Family: Mabuyidae
- Genus: Alinea
- Species: †A. luciae

Binomial name
- †Alinea luciae (Garman, 1887)

Species of lizard

Alinea luciae, the Saint Lucia skink, was a species of skink found in Saint Lucia. It is now considered extinct.
