= Ophiophagy =

To feed by hunting and eating snakes

Ophiophagy (Greek: ὄφις + φαγία, lit. 'snake eating') is a specialized form of feeding or alimentary behavior of animals which hunt and eat snakes. There are ophiophagous mammals (such as the skunks and the mongooses), birds (such as snake eagles, the secretarybird, coucals and some hawks), lizards (such as the common collared lizard), and even other snakes, such as the Central and South American mussuranas and the North American common kingsnake. The venomous king cobra (Ophiophagus hannah) is also named for this habit.

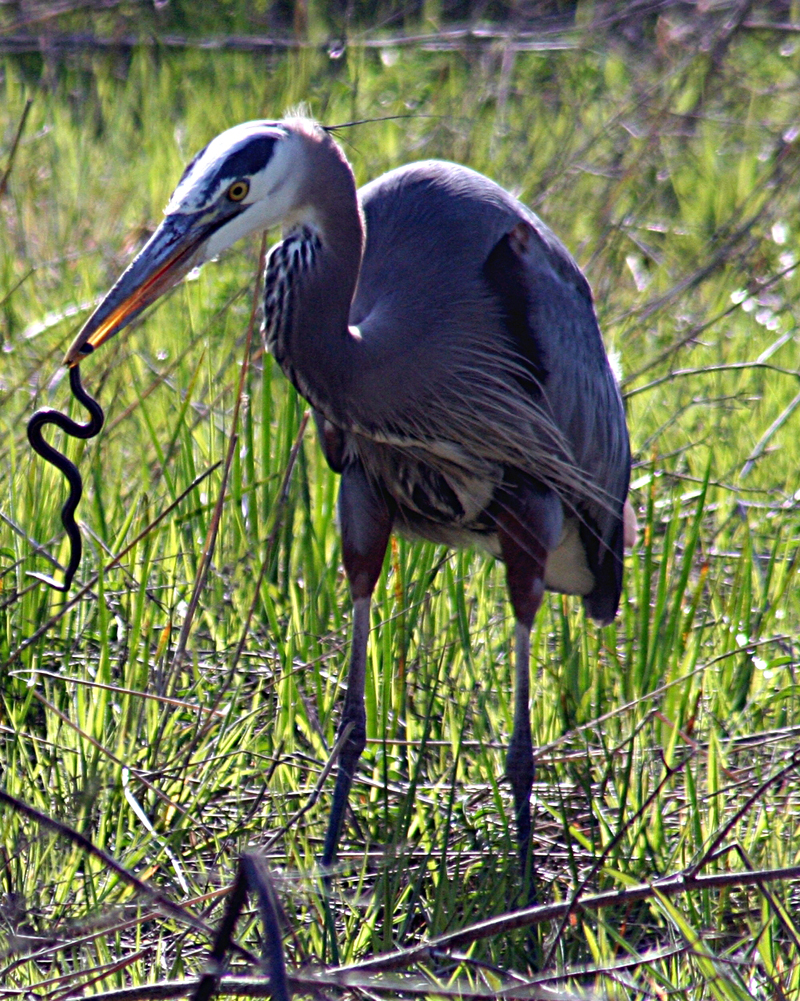
Great blue heron with a snake

== Ophiophagy in myth and legend ==
The mythic associations of snakes are discussed at Serpent (symbolism).

A snake-eating raptor appears in a legend of the ancient Mexican people, who gave rise to the Aztec empire; this is represented in the Mexican flag. The Mexica people, guided by their god Huitzilopochtli, sought the place where a bird lands on the prickly pear and devours a snake. They found their sign on an island in Lake Texcoco, where they erected the city of Tenochtitlan ("Place of the Prickly Pear Cactus"; present-day México City) in 1325. On the coat of arms of México, this bird is said to be depicted as a golden eagle, though it is also often said to be a crested caracara. It is also possible that the bird was inspired by a laughing falcon or red-tailed hawk, both raptors which feed on a large number of reptiles, including snakes.

The golden eagle will actually eat snakes, but does not specialize in them, preferring larger mammalian prey, from medium-sized rodents and lagomorphs to mustelids even small mammalian carnivores, all the way to deer fawns and lambs. However, snakes are the most common type of reptile to appear in the golden eagle's diet, making up about 2.9% of the remains from all studied golden eagle nests.

Coat of arms of Mexico

The Mayans also had the legend of ophiophagy in their folklore and mythology.

Guatemala may derive its name from the Nahuatl word coactlmoctl-lan, meaning "land of the snake-eating bird."

Christian scripture associates snakes with "evil" (see serpent), and considers anything that destroys them "good" (i.e., Saint Patrick allegedly having "driven" all of the snakes from Ireland, through the power of God). An example for this tradition is further seen, metaphorically, in Rudyard Kipling's short story Rikki-Tikki-Tavi (part of The Jungle Book), in which a mongoose named Rikki-Tikki defends a human family against a pair of evil cobras. On a basic, natural level, most species of mongoose (and meerkats) are known to hunt and eat snakes much larger than themselves, including some of the most venomous cobras, vipers, boomslangs and mambas, instinctively avoiding the venom glands.

In Hindu and Buddhist folklore, Garuda (the eagle-deity mount of Vishnu) is the enemy of the Nāgas, a race of intelligent serpent- or dragon-like beings, whom he hunts.

== Practical use ==
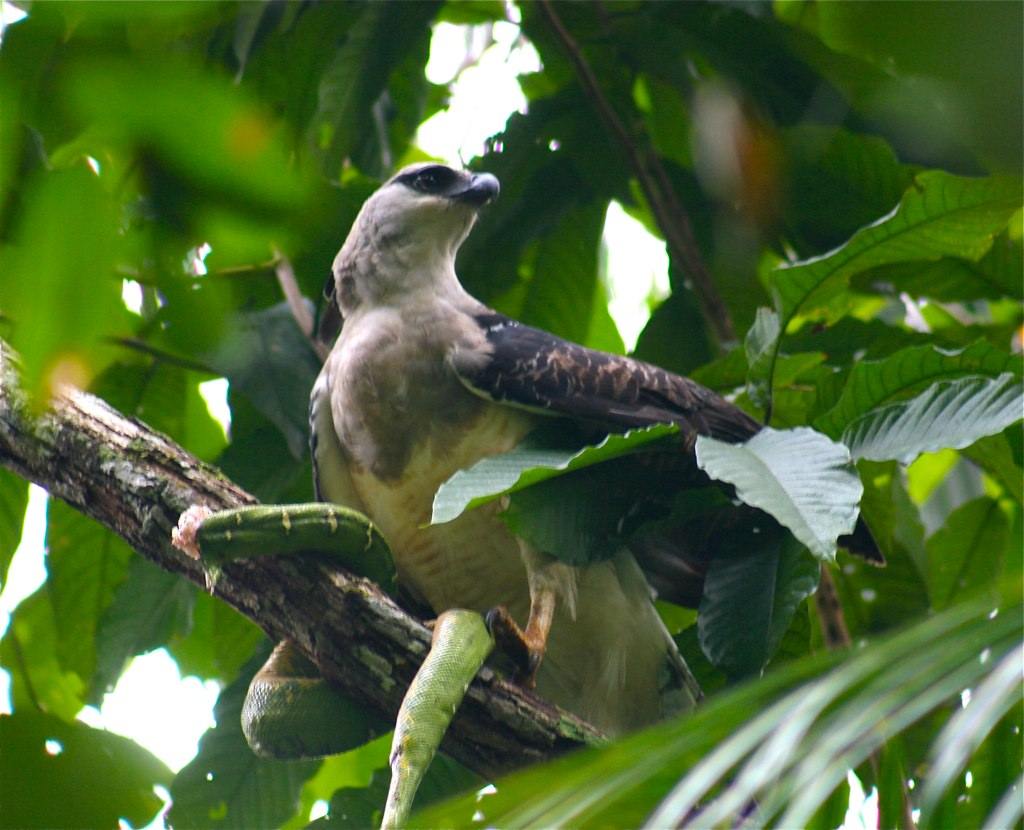
Crested eagle with emerald tree boa prey

In some regions, farmers keep ophiophagous animals as pets in order to keep their living environment clear of such snakes as cobras and pit vipers (including rattlesnakes and lanceheads) which annually claim a large number of deaths of domestic animals, such as cattle, and bites on humans. An example is tamed mongooses in India. In the 1930s a Brazilian plan to breed and release large numbers of mussuranas for the control of pit vipers was tried but did not work. The Butantan Institute, in São Paulo, which specializes in the production of antivenoms, erected a statue of the mussurana Clelia clelia as its symbol and a tribute to its usefulness in combating venomous snake bites. Peafowl have been kept for millennia due to their ophiophagous habit.

== Immunity ==
Many ophiophagous animals seem to be immune to the venom of the usual snakes they prey and feed upon. The phenomenon was studied in the mussurana by the Brazilian scientist Vital Brazil. They have antihemorrhagic and antineurotoxic antibodies in their blood. The Virginia opossum (Didelphis virginiana) has been found to have the most resistance towards snake venom. This immunity is not acquired and has probably evolved as an adaptation to predation by venomous snakes in their habitat.

In Rudyard Kipling's The Jungle Book, the author correctly dismisses the idea of mongooses ingesting herbs to combat poison as old folklore. He attributes no special abilities to the animal other than superb agility and skill at avoiding being bitten. However, recent studies have shown that the mongoose's ability to resist snake venom is at least in part due to its modified nicotinic acetylcholine receptor (AcChoR) that does not bind with alpha-BTX, and alpha-neurotoxin.
