= Mussurana =

Mussurana can refer to the following snake genera:

- Mussurana
- Clelia
- Boiruna
