= Ava Guarani people =

Indigenous people in Bolivia

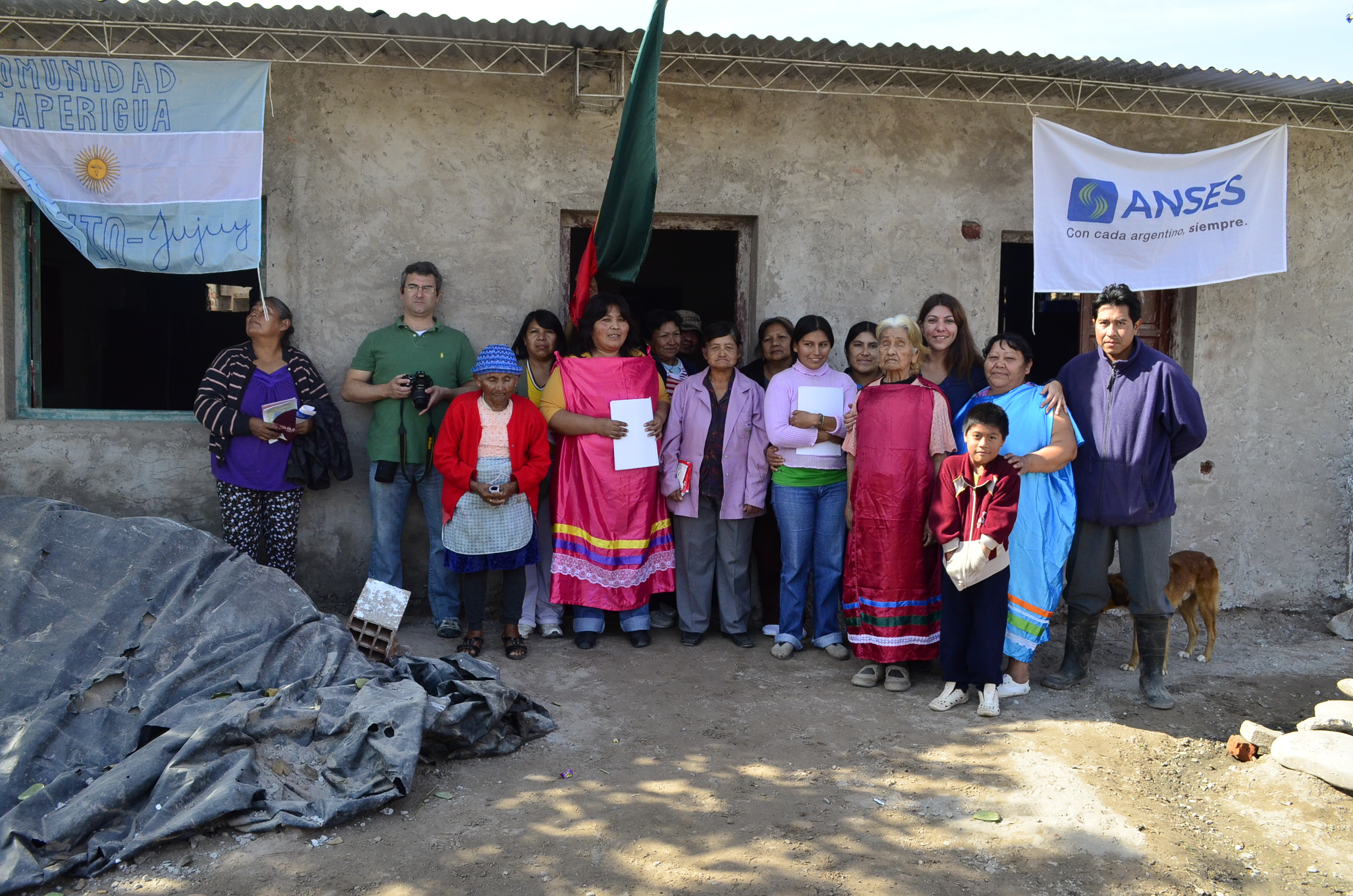
Ava Guaraní people in Jujuy, Argentina.

The Ava Guaraní are an Indigenous people formerly known as Chiriguanos or Chiriguano Indians who speak the Ava Guarani and Eastern Bolivian Guaraní languages. Noted for their warlike character, the Chiriguanos retained their lands in the Andes foothills of southeastern Bolivia from the 16th to the 19th centuries by fending off, first, the Inca Empire, later, the Spanish Empire, and, still later, independent Bolivia. The Chiriguanos were finally subjugated in 1892.

The Chiriguanos of history nearly disappeared from public consciousness after their 1892 defeat—but were reborn beginning in the 1970s. In the 21st century the descendants of the Chiriguanos call themselves Guaranis which links them with millions of speakers of Guarani dialects and languages in Paraguay, Argentina, and Brazil.

The census of 2001 counted 81,011 Guaraní, mostly Chiriguanos, over 15 years of age living in Bolivia. A 2010 census counted 18,000 Ava Guarani in Argentina. The Eastern Bolivian Guaraní language was spoken by 33,000 people in Bolivia, 15,000 in Argentina, and a few hundred in Paraguay.

== Origin of the name and people ==
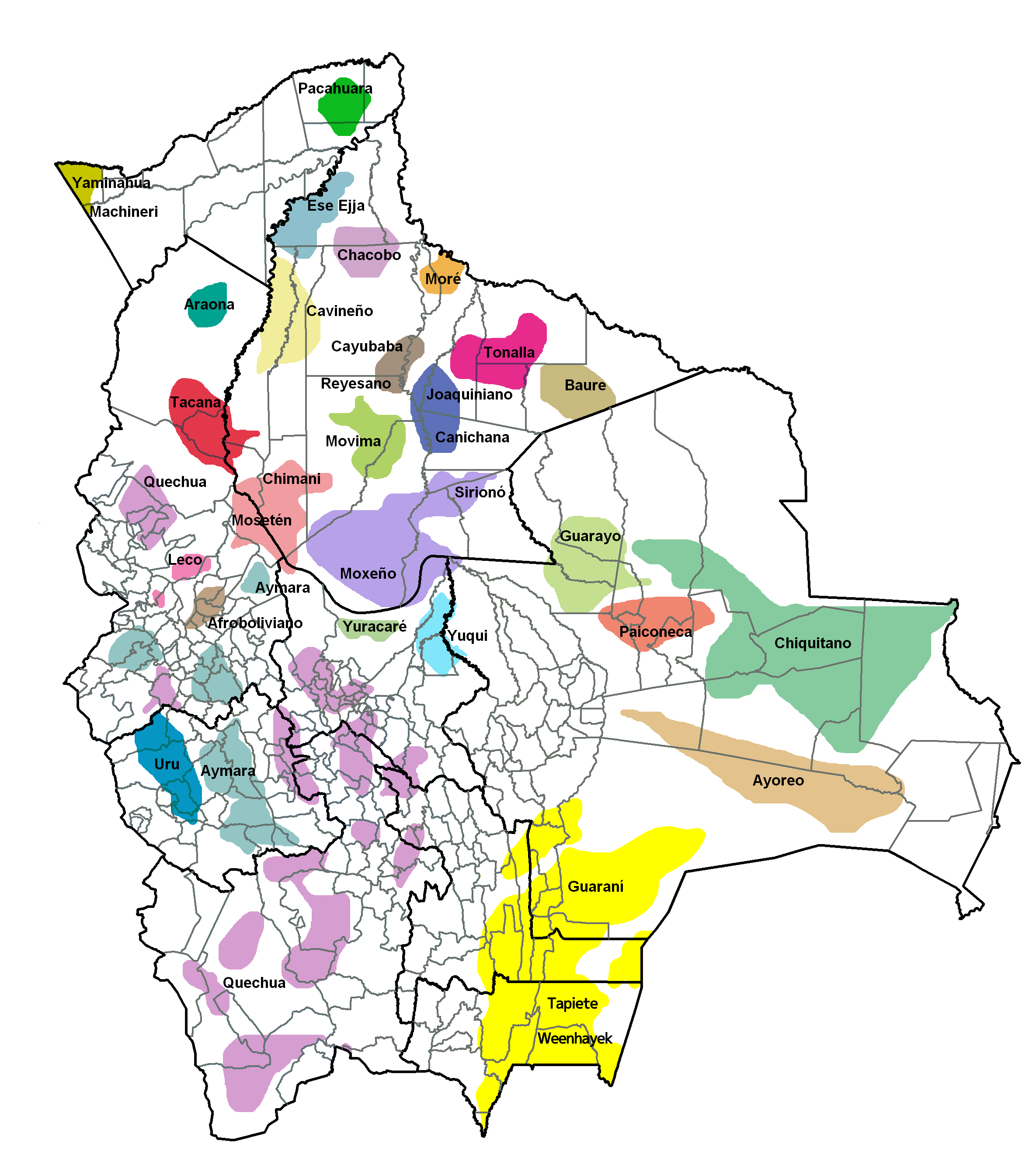
Ethnic groups of Bolivia (2006). The Guarani (Chiriguanos) occupied a larger area in the 16th through 19th century.

The common name for the Eastern Bolivian Guaraní since the 16th century has been variations of the name "Chirihuano", a word of Quechua origin which referred to itinerant doctors or medicine vendors (curanderos) from the Bolivian province of Larecaja, called also Collahuayas, Yungeños and Charasanis. Because "chiri" means "cold" in Quechua, the word chirihuano has been interpreted with the pejorative meaning of "people who die from freezing". In the late 16th century, the Quechua term was Hispanized to Chiriguanos. Although Chiriguanos usually refers to Guarani language speaking peoples in eastern Bolivia, the Spanish sometimes applied the term to all Guarani peoples and other lowland people speaking non-Guarani languages living in the eastern Andes and the Gran Chaco region.

The Chiriguanos called themselves "ava", meaning humans. The Guarani people are believed by archaeologists to have originated in the central part of the Amazon rainforest and migrated southward at an uncertain date. Equally uncertain is the date they arrived in eastern Bolivia. The historical Chirguano were a synthesis of the Chané and the Guaraní. The Chiroguanos migrated from Paraguay to Bolivia in the beginning of the 16th century absorbing, assimilating, and enslaving the Chané. Chiriguano raids on the lands of the of Yamparae (present-day Sucre) predates the incorporation this area to the Inca Empire.

Some Ava Guaraní peoples may still have been migrating into the eastern Andes at the time of the Spanish conquest in the 1530s, possibly drawn by the riches of the Incas and Spanish and in search of the mythical land of "Candire", the "land without evil", rich with gold and other wealth.

== Culture ==
The Chiriguanos occupied the foothills between the high Andes and the Altiplano and the flat plains of the Gran Chaco, living mostly at elevations between 1,000 metres (3,300 ft) and 2,000 metres (6,600 ft). The climate is sub-tropical and precipitation during the rainy season is adequate for growing crops. The region is characterized by steep ridges and deep river valleys making access and communication difficult. The Chiriguanos were never united as a people into a single political unit, but instead functioned on the village level and formed loosely-organized regional coalitions headed by a paramount chieftain, or tubicha rubicha (capitán grande in Spanish).

The Chiriguanos had a warrior ethos, fighting among themselves as well as outsiders. They said they were "men without masters" and considered themselves superior to other peoples whom they called "tapua" or slaves. The Spanish described them in the most unfavorable terms possible: without religion and government, dedicated to war and cannibalism, naked and sexually promiscuous. That litany of offenses justified, in Spanish eyes, undertaking wars of "fire and blood" against the Chiriguanos and enslaving them.

The Chiriguanos acquired horses and guns from the Spanish, but their preferred method of fighting was on foot and with bow and arrow. The Spanish by contrast preferred to fight on horseback and with guns, although guns were in short supply on the frontier for much of history. The Chiriguanos were an agricultural people, cultivating maize and other crops. They initially lived in very large longhouses in villages, but, probably for defense, they came to live in small dispersed settlements of individual houses.

Until the 19th century the Chiriguanos proved impervious to the attempts of missionaries to convert them to Christianity. A Jesuit mission in 1767 had only 268 Chiriguano converts, as compared to the tens of thousands the Jesuits had converted eastward in Paraguay among other Guarani speaking peoples.

== Early wars against the Incas and Spanish ==
Spanish estimates of the number of Chiriguano warriors between 1558 and 1623 range from 500 to 4,000. Despite epidemics of European diseases, the Chiriguano population, probably due in part to the incorporation of the Chané, rose to a high of more than 100,000 in the late 18th century.

Large-scale Chiriguano raids against the Inca began in the 1520s. The Inca established defensive settlements, including what are now the archaeological sites of Oroncota and Samaipata, to fend off the Chiriguanos. The Spanish became concerned with the raids of the Chiriguanos in the 1540s because they threatened the indigenous (Indian) workers of the rich silver mines at Potosí and surrounding areas. The Spanish also wished to establish links between their settlements in the Andes and those in Paraguay. In 1564, under a leader named Vitapue, the Chriguanos destroyed two Spanish settlements in eastern Bolivia and a generalized war between the Spaniards and the Chiriguanos began. In 1574, The Viceroy of Peru, Francisco de Toledo led a large—and unsuccessful—invasion into Chiriguano territory and in 1584 the Spanish declared a "war of fire and blood" against the Chiriguanos. In 1594, the Chiriguano forced the abandonment of the Spanish settlement of Santa Cruz and its relocation to the present site of the city of Santa Cruz de la Sierra. Some of the settlers abandoned the area and floated down the Amazon River to its mouth and returned to Spain.

The Spanish in the early 17th century followed a policy of attempting to populate the Andean foothills where the Chiriguanos lived and established three main centers as frontier defense: Santa Cruz de la Sierra, Tomina, 80 kilometres (50 mi) east of Sucre), and Tarija. By about 1620, however, the Spanish had given up ambitious attempts to advance the frontier. Records are lacking for the next 100 years, but it appears it was a period of relative peace in which Spaniard and indigenous allies enjoyed an uneasy co-existence with the Chiriguanos, although punctuated by mutual raids on each other.

The Jesuits, successful in their missionary enterprises in Paraguay, attempted to Christianize the Chiriguanos as early as the 1630s, but had little success.

== 18th century ==
What historian Thierry Saignes called the "General Uprising" of the Chiriguanos began in 1727. The underlying causes of the uprising were the Spanish colonization of areas near Tarija, led by Jesuit, Dominican, and Franciscan missionaries and Spanish cattle ranchers who coveted the rich pasture lands of the Andes foothills. The spark that ignited the war was the punishment by the missionaries of Chiriguano neophytes at Jesuit and Dominican missions, especially that of Juan Bautista Aruma, who became one of the three principal leaders of the uprising. However, during the war, the Chiriguanos were not united. Their leaders pursued different strategies and some Chiriguanos did not join the uprising.

In October 1727, with cooperation from the Toba and Mocoví peoples, the Chiriguanos attacked with an army of 7,000 men, destroying Christian missions and Spanish ranches east of Tarija, killing more than 200 Spaniards and taking many women and children prisoner. In March 1728, they attacked Monteagudo (then called Sauces), burned the Church and took 80 Spanish prisoners. The Spanish counterattacked from Santa Cruz in July 1728 with an army of 1200 Spaniards and 200 Chiquitano archers recruited from the Jesuit Missions of Chiquitos in eastern Bolivia. The Spanish army destroyed many Chiriguano villages, killed more than 200 people, and took more than 1,000 prisoners. Violating a truce to negotiate an exchange of prisoners, the Spanish captured 62 Chiriguano leaders, including Aruma, and enslaved them in the silver mines. Spanish expeditions into Chiriguano territory in 1729 and 1731 were less successful. In 1735 the Chiriguano besieged Santa Cruz but the siege was broken by 340 Chiquitano warriors sent from Jesuit missions. In that same year, the Chiriguanos destroyed two reestablished Jesuit missions near Tarija. The Chiriguano integrated some of their captives into their society; others on both sides were released or ransomed, with slavery being a common fate of captives of the Spanish, especially women and children.

After the General Uprising, additional wars in the 18th century between the Chiriguano and Spanish occurred in 1750 and from 1793 to 1799. The brush-fire wars between Spaniard and Chiriguano were largely conflicts about resources. The Chiriguanos were farmers who grew corn; the Spanish and Mestizo settlers encroaching upon or living in Chiriguano territory were ranchers who raised cattle. The ranchers and their cattle destroyed Chiriguano settlements and corn fields and the Chiriguanos killed cattle and often ranchers.

== 19th century ==
According to scholar Erick Langer, the Chiriguanos held the upper hand in the Andes borderlands until the 1860s. Spanish-speaking communities, called Creole or "karai" as most of the people were of mixed Spanish-indigenous heritage, survived by paying tribute to local Chiriguano groups. However, Chiriguano maize crops failed during a drought from 1839 to 1841 and the Chiriguanos resorted to increased raids on cattle herds, both eating the cattle and killing them to halt the advances of the Hispanic ranchers. As the demand for meat increased in the rest of Bolivia, the pressure on the Chiriguanos by the ranchers and soldiers became more intense. Also, it appears that the population of the Chiriguanos declined after the 18th century.

"The most important factor in the loss of Chiriguano independence was the reestablishment of the Franciscan missions" beginning in 1845. After more than two centuries of failure, Christian missions enjoyed some success among the Chiriguanos. The reasons for this success seemed to be that many Chiriguanos turned to the missions for protection from internal disputes and conflict with the Creole ranchers and settlers, the Bolivian government, and other indigenous peoples. The missions and the Bolivian government benefited from the labor of the mission Chiriguanos and also recruited many of them as soldiers against independent Chiriguanos and other Indians. The numbers and the independence of the Chiriguano also declined beginning in the 1850s when many of them began migrating to Argentina to work on sugar plantations. By the 1860s, the Bolivian government was taking a more aggressive stand against the Chiriguanos, awarding large grants of land to ranchers in their territory. Outright massacres of Chiriguanos became more common. Chiriguano fighters were routinely executed when captured and women and children sold into servitude. On the other hand, the missions were also responsible for changing the culture of Chririguano groups and how they interacted with an increasingly modernized economy. Franciscan education disciplined the Chiriguanos into a westernized form of society that participated in the economy the way religious and political leaders saw fit. The leader of the Macharetí Chiriguano, Mandenopay, eventually served as a middleman in an international labor migration that sent many of his people from southeast Bolivia to work in Argentina. The Franciscan missions aided in the deterioration of indigenous autonomy, causing the Chiriguano to become an economically dependent labor force. Migration to Argentina and merger there of some Ava Guaraní into the Toba people was influneced by the establishment of the mission of Nuestra Señora del Rosario del Ingre.

The Chiriguanos made two last attempts to retain their independence: the Huacaya War of 1874-1877, in which rebellious Chiriguanos were defeated, and the rebellion of 1892. The 1892 rebellion broke out in January at the mission of Santa Rosa de Cuevo. It was led by a 28 year old man named Chapiaguasu, who styled himself Apiaguaiki Tumpa (Eunuch of God) and said that he had been sent to earth to save the Chiriguanos from Christianity and the Franciscan missionaries. With an army of 1,300 Chiriguanos, Apiaguaiki led a failed attack against the mission on January 21. The Creoles led a counter-attack on January 28 with 50 soldiers, 140 Creole militia, and 1,500 friendly Indians armed with bows and arrows. In the Battle of Kuruyuki, the Creole army killed more than 600 Chiriguanos with losses of their own of only four killed, all Indians. Following the battle, the Creole army massacred Chiriguanos who surrendered and sold women and children into slavery. The 2,000 Chiriguanos resident at the Santa Rosa de Cuevo mission mostly supported the Creole army.

Apiaguaiki was later captured and on March 29, 1892 was tortured and executed by Bolivian authorities. The movement he led was similar to other contemporary Millenarian movements around the world such as the Ghost Dance in the United States and the Boxer Rebellion in China.

== 20th and 21st centuries ==
The influence of the Fransciscan missions declined during the 20th century. A Chiriguano leader named Ubaldino Cundeye, his wife, Octavia, and relatives moved to La Paz in 1930 and asserted that the Chiriguanos had rights as citizens of Bolivia. Cundeye campaigned for the Chiriguanos to reclaim land from the missions. However, the Chaco War (1932-1935) resulted in the dispossession of much of the remaining land belonging to the missions and the Chiriguanos. The Chiriguanos largely became migrant, landless workers, many in Argentina. The missions were finally dissolved in 1949.

Communist revolutionary Ernesto "Che" Guevara was attempting to foment revolution among the Chiriguanos when he was captured and executed by Bolivian soldiers on October 9, 1967. Guevara and his Cuban followers had studied Quechua to communicate with Bolivian peasants, but the Chiriguanos spoke Guarani. In 2005, to attract tourists, the Guarani created the "Trail of Che Guevara" which extends for 300 kilometres (190 miles) through the territory in which Guevara and his mini-army operated.

The Eastern Bolivian or Ava Guaraní, as they are increasingly called rather than Chiriguano (which has pejorative origins), participate in the Assembly of the Guaraní People, founded in 1987, a pan-national organization which represents the Guaraní people in the several countries in which they live. The Guaraní are also represented in the Confederation of Indigenous Peoples of Bolivia. Their aim is to recover some of their ancestral lands and promote economic development, education, and health among their people.

A 2009 investigation by the Inter-American Commission on Human Rights found that 600 Guaraní families in Bolivia continue to live in conditions of "debt bondage and forced labor, which are practices that comprise contemporary forms of slavery."

== Pictures by Erland Nordenskiöld ==
Photos by Erland Nordenskiöld:

Chief Mandepora (Mandeponay) with a pot of cornmeal, 1908-1909.

Hut and storehouse, 1913-1914.

A Chiriguano village, 1908-1909.

Chiriguano hut interior, 1913-1914.

== Bibliography ==
- Tapia Matamala, Orlando; Prieto Serrano, Carla (2023). "Colonización y resistencia chiriguana: la conquista del cañón Abatiri, provincia de Azero, sureste de Bolivia (1850-1890)". In Harambour, Alberto; Serje, Margarita (eds.). La Era del Imperio y las Fronteras de la Civilización en América del sur (in Spanish). Bogotá-Santiago: Ediciones UniAndes-Pehuén. pp. 339–364. ISBN 9789587985108.
