= Hernando Siles (disambiguation) =

Hernando Siles may refer to:

- Hernando Siles Reyes (1882–1942), Bolivian politician
- Hernando Siles Province, Bolivia
- Estadio Hernando Siles, Bolivian sports stadium
