= Battle of Kuruyuki =

Battle in Chuquisaca, Bolivia

Date	January 28, 1892
Location	Near Cuevo, Bolivia
Result	Bolivian Army victory

Belligerents
Bolivia	Eastern Bolivian Guaraní

Commanders and leaders
unknown	Apiaguaiki Tumpa

Strength
50 soldiers, 140 creole militia, 1,500 Indians	unknown

Casualties and losses
unknown	600 dead
- 6000 dead

The Battle of Kuruyuki or Battle of Curuyuqui was fought near the town of Cuevo, Bolivia on January 28, 1892. The combatants were the Eastern Bolivian Guaraní (called Chiriguanos at that time) and a force made up of Bolivian military, militia, and Chiriguanos friendly to the government and Christianity. Often described as a massacre, the battle resulted in an overwhelming victory by the government forces. In the aftermath of the battle the government forces executed the Chiriguano leader, Apiaguaiki Tumpa or Hapiaoeki Tumpa, and many captives.

The battle ended 400 years of conflict by the Chiriguanos against, first, the Inca Empire, secondly, the Spanish Empire, and finally, the independent country of Bolivia.

Chiriguanos is the historical name, deriving from Quechua and Spanish, for the people who now prefer to be known as the Ava Guaraní or simply Guaraní.

== Background ==
The Eastern Bolivian Guaraní, popularly called Chiriguanos, were a warlike people who fought against the Inca Empire, its successor, the Spanish Empire, and Bolivia from 1520 or earlier until the Battle of Kuruyuki in 1892. They were mostly successful until the 1860s when a combination of encroachment on their lands by Spanish-speaking ranchers and settlers (creoles), antagonism between Christian and non-Christian Chiriguanos, and, possibly, demographic decline led to the defeat of Chiriguanos who wished to preserve their independence and rejected Christianity.

The Chiriguanos, who may have numbered more than 100,000 in the 18th century, were never united and their fragmentation into factions weakened their capability of countering the increasing power and influence of Bolivian Creoles in the late 19th century.

Chiriguano responses to the increasing stress on their society in the 19th century included the acceptance by many of Christianity and/or residence in the relatively safe, but regimented, environment of Franciscan missions—ten of which were established between 1845 and 1891. Other Chiriguanos made their peace with creole ranchers and settlers or journeyed to Argentina for seasonal work in the sugar cane fields. By 1891, 11,000 Chriguanos, many of them non-Christians, lived in the missions and most of the rest were working on ranches in Bolivia and Argentina.

In 1889, however, a 28-year old Chiriguano man named Chapiaguasu began his career as a prophet and healer with a message of restoring the old order of Chiriguano society and expelling the creoles and missionaries from their lands. Chapiaguasu called himself Apiaguaiki Tumpa (the Eunuch of God) and the aims of the movement he led were similar to other contemporary millenarian movements around the world such as the Boxer Rebellion in China and the Ghost Dance in the United States.

The spark that ignited the war was the rape and murder of a young Chiriguano woman on January 1, 1892 by the corregidor (mayor) of the town of Cuevo, near the Santa Rosa Mission. On January 7 Chiriguanos ambushed a Bolivian army patrol, attacked creole ranches, and sacked Cuevo. On January 12 a contingent of soldiers, volunteers and Indian archers was defeated by the Chiriguano forces of Apiaguaiki. 3,000 Creoles and 2,000 Chiriguanos took refuge in the mission as protection against Apiaguaiki and his followers. On January 21, Apiaguaiki led a force of 1000 men on foot and 300 on horseback against the walls of Santa Rosa. Departing from the usual Chiriguano tactics of ambush and hit-and-run attacks, Apiaguaiki attempted a frontal attack on the mission for which the weapons of the Indians, primarily bows and arrows, were ineffective. The Chiriguano leader of the mission community, Mandeponay, turned against Apiaguaiki at the last moment and aided the mission's defenders. After suffering 40 dead, Apiaguaiki called off the attack and he and his followers, numbering about 5,000, entrenched themselves at the community of Kuruyuki 13 kilometres (8.1 mi) northeast of the mission.

== The battle ==
In the days following the attack on the Santa Rosa Mission, the Creoles gathered reinforcements, including Indians from nearby missions and soldiers who arrived from Santa Cruz de la Sierra. On January 28, Bolivian army officers led a counter-attack with 50 soldiers, 140 creole militia (mostly armed with repeating rifles), and 1,500 Indians armed with bows and arrows. In the battle of Kuruyuki, the army killed more than 600 Chiriguanos with losses of their own of only four killed, all Indians. Following the battle, the army massacred Chiriguanos who surrendered and sold women and children into slavery. The 2,000 Chiriguanos resident at the Santa Rosa de Cuevo Mission mostly supported the army.

The Chirguanos dispersed after the battle but the Bolivian army, creoles, and Indian allies pursued them and killed thousands more. More than 6,000 Chiriguanos are estimated to have died during the war. Apiagauiki escaped from the scene of the battle, but was later betrayed and captured by the government forces. On March 29, he was tortured and executed at a public ceremony in the main plaza of the town of Sauces (now Monteagudo).

== Aftermath ==
The battle of Kuruyuki was the last gasp of the Chiriguanos as an independent ethnic group. The battle was largely forgotten by historians and the Chiriguanos until the 1970s when a resurgence began of the ethnic identity of the Chiriguanos, now mostly known as Ava Guaraní, Eastern Bolivian Guaraní, or simply Guaraní. In 2008, Evo Morales, the President of Bolivia, announced the creation of a University to be located in the community of Curuyuqui (also spelled Kuruyuki). In 2009, Morales attended a memorial service for the Chiriguanos killed in the battle of Kuruyuki and inaugurated the Apiaguaiki Tumpa Universidad Indigena de Tierras Bajas (Apiaguaiki Tumpa Indigenous University of the Lowlands).
