= Guaraní people =

Indigenous people of South America

Guarani
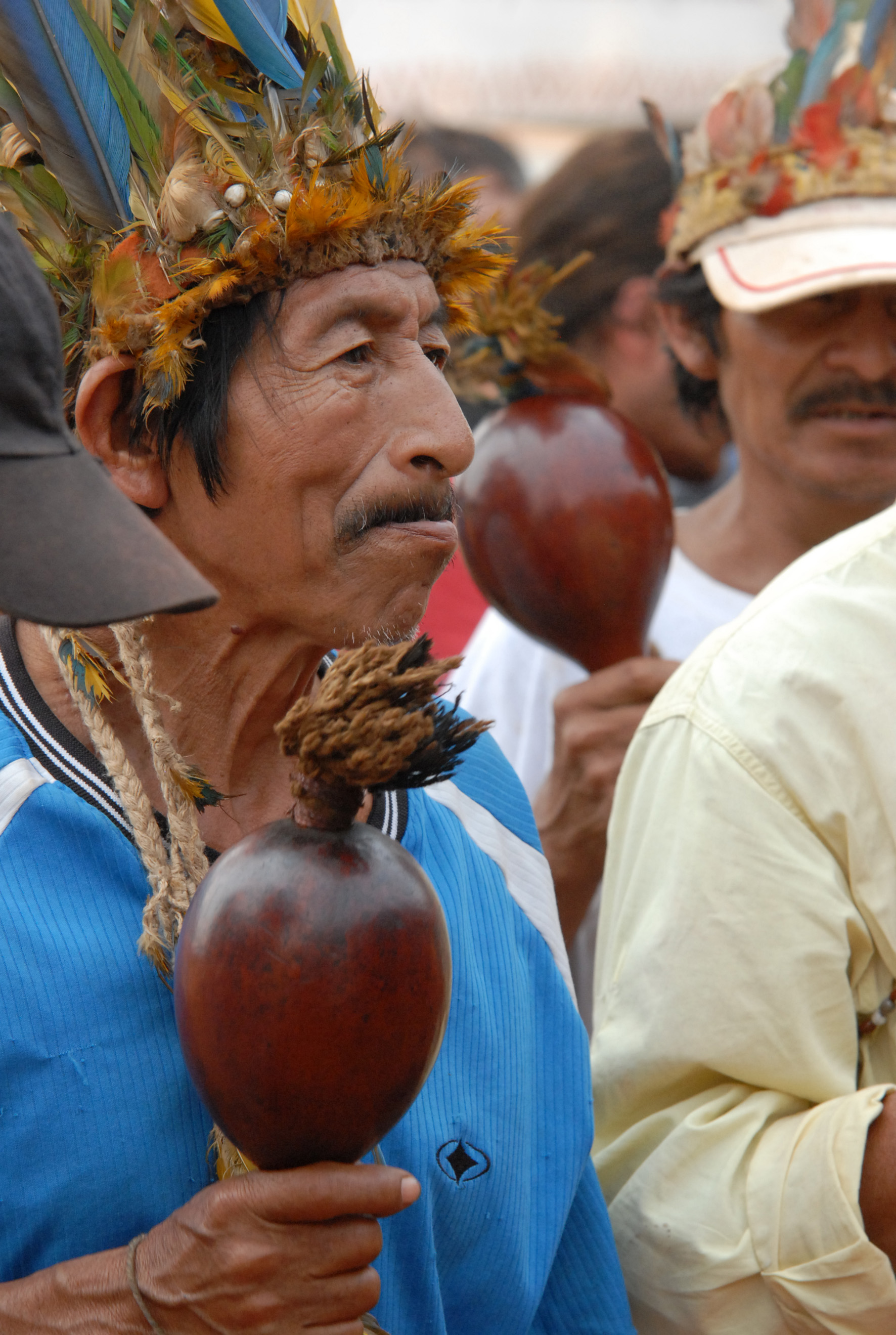
- Contemporary Guarani shaman

Total population
- c. 280,000–390,000 (estimated)

Regions with significant populations
- South America
- Argentina: 135,232 (2022)
- Bolivia: 103,712 (2024)
- Brazil: 85,000 (2017)
- Paraguay: 73,607 (2024)

Languages
- Native: Guarani: Others: Spanish; Portuguese

Religion
- Majority: Christianity (Catholicism; Protestantism); Minority: Native American religions; Animism

Related ethnic groups
- Chaná, Aché, Chané, Kaingang, Mbayá, Tupi, Mbyá Guaraní

The Guaraní are a group of culturally-related indigenous peoples of South America. They are distinguished from the related Tupi by their use of the Guarani language. The traditional range of the Guarani people is in what is now Paraguay between the Paraná River and lower Paraguay River, the Misiones Province of Argentina, southern Brazil once as far east as Rio de Janeiro, and parts of Uruguay and Bolivia.

The Guarani number around 280,000 and are primarily concentrated in Argentina, Bolivia, Brazil and Paraguay. Their demographic dominance of the region has been reduced by European colonisation and the commensurate rise of mestizos.

Most notably, the Guarani language, still widely spoken across traditional Guarani homelands, is one of the two official languages in Paraguay, the other one being Spanish. The Paraguayan population learns Guarani both informally from social interaction and formally in public schools. In modern Spanish, Guaraní also refers to any Paraguayan national in the same way that the French are sometimes called Gauls.

== Name ==
The history and meaning of the name Guaraní are subject to dispute. Before they encountered Europeans, the Guarani referred to themselves simply as Abá, meaning "men" or "people". The term Guarani was originally applied by early Jesuit missionaries to refer to natives who had accepted conversion to the Christian religion; Cayua or Caingua (ka'aguygua) was used to refer to those who had refused it. Cayua is roughly translated as "the ones from the jungle". While the term Cayua is sometimes still used to refer to settlements of Indigenous peoples who have not well integrated into the dominant society, the modern usage of the name Guarani is generally extended to include all people of native origin regardless of societal status. Barbara Ganson writes that the name Guaraní was given by the Spanish since it means "warrior" in the Tupi-Guaraní dialect spoken there. Guarinĩ is attested in 16th-century Old Tupi, by Jesuit sources, as "war, warrior, to wage war, warlord".

== History, myth and legend ==
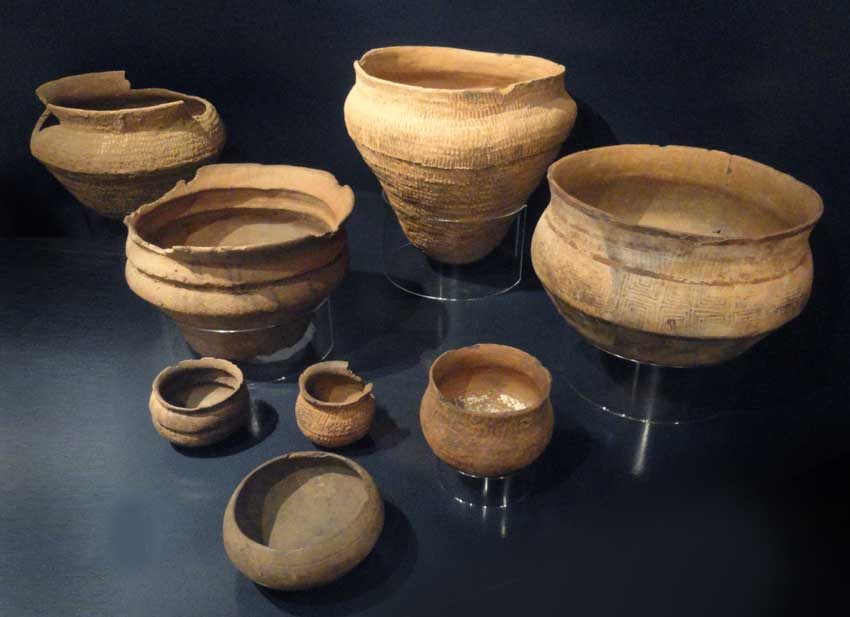
Guarani ceramics.

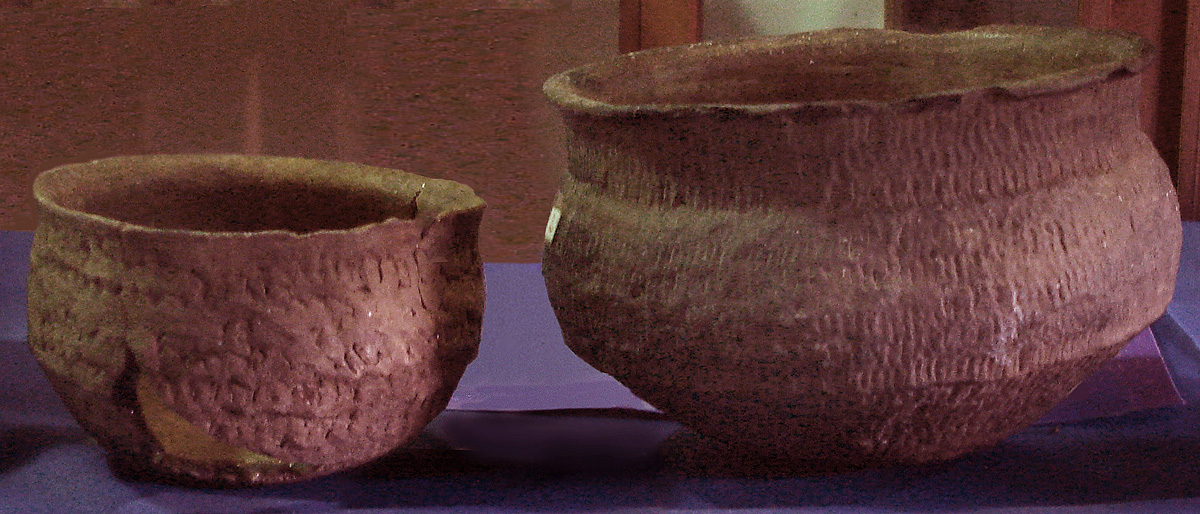
Guarani incised ceramics bowls, Museum Farroupilha, in Triunfo.

Early Guarani villages often consisted of communal houses (malocas, or ocas), with each house housing several families under the leadership of a chief. Communities were united by common interest and language, and tended to form tribal groups by dialect. It is estimated that the Guarani numbered some 400,000 people when they were first encountered by Europeans. At that time, they were sedentary and agricultural, subsisting largely on manioc, maize, wild game, and honey.

Polygamy was practiced. Cannibalism was practiced on captives.

Equally little is known about early Guarani society and beliefs. They practiced a form of animistic pantheism, much of which has survived in the form of folklore and numerous myths. According to the Jesuit missionary Martin Dobrizhoffer, they practiced cannibalism at one point, perhaps as a funerary ritual, but later disposed of the dead in large jars placed inverted on the ground. Guarani mythology is still widespread in rural Paraguay.

Guarani myths and legends were compiled by the Universidad Nacional de Misiones in northern Argentina and published as Myths and Legends: A Journey around the Guarani Lands, Anthology in 1870 (translated into the English language in 1906). Guarani myth and legend can roughly be divided into the following broad categories:

- Cosmogonic and eschatological myths; the creation and destruction of all things as dictated by Ñamandu "the true father, the first one". After him comes a pantheon of gods, chief among them Yporú who is more frequently known as Tupã. Jasy (or Jaci) is another "good" deity who rules the night while Aña is a malign deity who dwells at the bottom of the Iguazu River.
- Animistic mythology, that is animals, plants and minerals being animated and capable of becoming anthropomorphic beings or in reverse the transmuted souls of people, either born or unborn, who have become animals, plants and minerals. The course of such anthropomorphism appears dictated by the pantheon of god-like deities because of their virtues or vices. Such animistic legends include that of the Lobizón, a werewolf-type being, and the Mainumby or hummingbird who transports good spirits that are resident in flowers back to Tupá "so he can cherish them". Isondú or glowworms are the reincarnated spirits of certain people, as are the Panambi (butterflies). Ka'a Jarýi was a woman who became the sacred herb Yerba; Irupé was a woman who was turned into the giant lily because she fell in love with the moon.
- Pombero are goblin or elf-like spirits who dwell in the forest and must be appeased. They have never been human. Principal among these is Jasy Jatere who has never been human and like all Pombero is from a different realm. His characteristics are vague and uncertain, and his powers are badly defined as is the place where he resides. He is described in one legend as a "handsome, thickly bearded, blond dwarf" who is naked and lives in tree trunks. Other versions say he loves honey, his feet are backward, and he is an "ugly, lame, old man". Most legends agree that he snatches children and "licks them", wrapping them in climbing plants or drowning them in rivers. To appease him gifts, such as honey, are left in places in the forest associated with him. Another Pombero is Kuarahy Jára who whistles like birds and is their protector. He can be your friend but is known for abducting young boys who are alone and trying to catch birds. If necessary he can take the form of a person, a tree or a hyacinth. Finally, Kurupi is a phallic mythological figure who will copulate with young women. He has scaly skin like a lizard, hypnotic eyes, and an enormous penis.

The Iguazu Falls, considered sacred by the Guarani, hold special significance and are the inspiration for numerous myths and legends. They reveal the sound of ancient battles at certain times, they are also the place where I-Yara—a malign Pomboro spirit—abducted Angá—a fair maiden—and hid her. The swallows that inhabit the falls to this day vainly search for her.

=== European contact ===
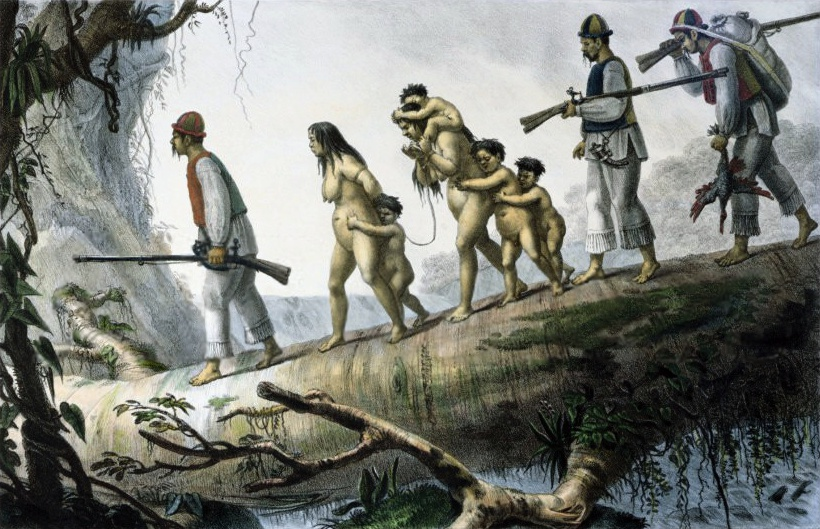
A Guarani family captured by slave hunters. By Jean Baptiste Debret

A Spanish expedition led by Juan Diaz de Solis was the first Spaniard to reach Rio de la Plata. After his forces were defeated by natives in 1516, a surviving force led by Alejo Garcia continued inland with a Guarani band.

In 1537, Gonzalo de Mendoza traversed through Paraguay to about the present Brazilian frontier. On his return, he made acquaintance with the Guarani and founded the city of Asunción, later the capital of Paraguay. The first governor of the Spanish territory of Guayrá initiated a policy of intermarriage between European men and Indigenous women; the descendants of these matches characterize the Paraguayan nation today. Modern historians, however, characterise this process as one of sexual and economic coercion rather than voluntary union: the initial Guaraní practice of the cuñadazgo — by which caciques gave women to newcomers to cement alliances — was supplanted after 1541 by the violent rancheadas, mass seizures of women who were bought, sold, and exported as slaves to Portuguese settlements on the Atlantic coast. The Laws of the Indies forbade slavery in Hispanic America. However, the conquistadors and settlers of Asunción continued to act without respecting the new legislation, as denounced by the priest Francisco González de Paniagua in a letter written on 3 March 1545:

"There has been used since the imprisonment of the governor among the Christians of this land a trade and commerce under great deception very much to the offense of God our Lord, harm and damage to the conscience of His Majesty and against his royal provisions, and this is to sell the free and native Indian women of this land as if they were slaves come from Guinea in this fashion: I sell a house and a field that may be worth at public auction 20 ducats and no more and I say to the person to whom I sell it: I have to give you this house and field and you must make me an obligation of 40 ducats in which only the house and field were involved, and because these 2 pieces are not worth so much by a great amount, that as agreed between you and me [...] I will give you 1 Guaraní Indian woman from this land [...] who you know is free and cannot be sold [...] Another somewhat more licit one and in this out of necessity of the land, in which they had remedied themselves of service and firewood, in this land they were stripped of some garment: I have a cloak and another has an Indian woman, and the cloak was exchanged for the Indian woman out of the necessity that one has for the cloak and the other for the Indian woman, under the pretext of not selling the Indian woman but her service, passing from one to the other with the same freedom she had before / it has also been practiced to give and exchange a branded slave for a free Indian woman / and in this case not only laypeople have erred but even religious."

In 1542, a Guarani group rebelled against the Spanish. Aracare, chief of a Guarani group from the Jejuy River, refused to serve a Spanish expedition, which prompted the Spanish governor Alvar Nunez Cabeza de Vaca to issue an order to apprehend Aracare. Aracare was subsequently hanged by the Spanish. This prompted an unsuccessful rebellion by Tabare and Guarani against the Spanish.

The first two Jesuits, Father Barcena and Father Angulo, came to what is now the State of Paraná, Southern Brazil, in 1585, by land from the west. Others soon followed, and a Jesuit college was established at Asunción. In 1608, as a result of the Jesuit protest against the enslavement of the Indigenous population, King Philip III of Spain gave authority to the Jesuits to convert and colonize the tribes of Guayrá. In the early period, the name Paraguay was loosely used to designate the entire river basin, including parts of what are now Uruguay, Argentina, Bolivia, and Brazil.

Exploring expeditions were accompanied by Franciscan friars. Early in the history of Asunción, Father Luis de Bolaños translated the catechism into the Guarani language and preached to Guarani people who resided in the area around the settlement. In 1588–89 St. Francis Solanus crossed the Chaco wilderness from Peru and stopped at Asunción, but gave no attention to the Guarani. His departure left the Jesuits alone with their missionary work, and to defend the natives against slave dealers. The Jesuit provincial Torres arrived in 1607, and "immediately placed himself at the head of those who had opposed the cruelties at all times exercised over the natives".

=== The Jesuits ===
The arrival of the Jesuits to Guaraní territory in the seventeenth century resulted in a re-organization of the social, political and economic structures of the Guaraní peoples. The communities (commonly referred to as "missions") that the Jesuits established amassed a total population that surpassed 100 000 Guaraní peoples. The subjugation of the Guaraní people to one social, economic, political, and spiritual order in the missions contributed to a false construction of the Guaraní as a homogeneous people. Wilde articulated it well in his assertion that:

The missions constituted an "imagined community" that over the course of 150 years incorporated very diverse populations that had to adapt to a single pattern of spatial and temporal organization.

Initially, the Spaniards recognized the differences amongst the indigenous people of the Guaraní territory; yet, Spanish documentation failed to adequately recognize this diversity.

=== The Paraguayan Reductions ===
In 1607, Spanish King Philip III sent a letter to the governor of Rio de Plata Hernandarias de Saavedra to instruct him to send the newly arrived Jesuits to begin their missionary work. With Spanish royal protection, the first Guayrá mission, Loreto, was established on the Paranapanema by Father Joseph Cataldino and Father Simon Macerata in 1610. The Jesuit priest Father Ruiz de Montoya discussed the difficulties of spreading the missions and his interactions with the Guarani in his book The Spiritual Conquest. Ruiz de Montoya wrote that one of the Guarani caciques Miguel Artiguaye initially refused to join the missions until threatened by another Indigenous group. Artiguaye then returned to the mission and begged for protection. As the mission provided the only real possible protection against enslavement, the Guarani flocked there in such numbers that twelve more missions were created in rapid succession, containing all 40,000 Guaranis. The Jesuits were seen as intermediaries between the Spanish authorities and the Guarani caciques. The Jesuit missions needed new converts and required workers to assist in the maintenance of the missions. The Guarani helped grow the crops to sustain the missions' populations and also produce goods to sell and trade to fund the missions. Stimulated by this success, Father González and two companions journeyed to the east bank of the Uruguay River (now the country of Uruguay) and established two or three small missions in 1627. The local tribes killed the priests and the neophytes and burned the missions.

Slave raiders saw the Guarani missions as "merely an opportunity of capturing more Indians than usual at a haul". In 1629, an army of Paulistas surrounded the San Antonio mission, set fire to the church and other buildings, killed those who resisted or were too young or too old to travel, and carried the rest into slavery. San Miguel and Jesus Maria quickly met the same fate. Eventually, reinforcements gathered by Father Cataldino drove off the slavers. Within two years, all but two of the establishments were destroyed, and 60,000 Christian converts were carried off for sale to São Paulo and Rio de Janeiro. The attacks usually took place on Sunday, when the whole mission population was gathered for Mass. The priests were usually spared, but several were killed.

Only a few thousand natives were left of nearly 100,000 just before the Paulista invasion. Father Antonio Ruiz de Montoya purchased 10,000 cattle, and was able to convert the natives from farmers to stock raisers. Soon under Fathers Rançoncier and Romero the Uruguay missions were re-established. In 1632 the Mamelucos discovered a new line of attack from the south. In 1638, despite some successful resistance, all twelve of the missions beyond the Uruguay River were abandoned and their people consolidated with the community of the Missions Territory. In the last raid Father Alfaro was killed.

In the same year Father Montoya, after having successfully opposed the attempts of the governor and the bishop of Asunción to reduce the natives' liberties and the mission administration, sailed for Europe. On this trip he was successful in obtaining letters from Pope Urban VIII forbidding the enslavement of the missionaries under the severest church penalties, and from King Philip IV of Spain, permitting Guaranis to carry firearms for defense and to be trained in their use by veteran soldiers who had become Jesuits.

When the next Paulista army, 800 strong, attacked the missions in 1641 they were met by a body of Christian Guarani armed with guns on the Acaray River. In two battles, the Paulista army suffered a defeat that warded off invasions for ten years. In 1651, the war between Spain and Portugal encouraged another Paulista attack to gain territory for Portugal. Before Spanish troops could arrive to help defend the missions, the fathers themselves led a Guarani army against the enemy. In 1732, at the time of their greatest prosperity, the Guarani missions were guarded by a well-drilled and well-equipped army of 7,000 Guaranis. On more than one occasion this mission army, accompanied by their priests, defended the Spanish colony.

In 1732, there were 30 Guarani missions with 141,252 converted Guaranis. Two years later a smallpox epidemic killed approximately 30,000 of them. In 1765, a second outbreak killed approximately 12,000 more, and then spread westward through the tribes of the Chaco.

==== Uruguay missions saved ====
In 1750 the Treaty of Madrid between Spain and Portugal transferred to Portugal the territory of the seven missions on the Uruguay River, and the Guaranis were ordered to leave; they refused, being familiar with the Portuguese as slave hunters. Seven years of guerrilla warfare killed thousands of them (see Guarani War). The Jesuits secured a royal decree restoring the disputed mission territory to Spanish jurisdiction. Two missions in 1747 and a third in 1760 were established in the sub-tribe of the Itatínes, or Tobatines, in central Paraguay, far north of the older mission group. In one of these, San Joaquín de los Tobatines (founded 1747), Martin Dobrizhoffer ministered for eight years.

==== Treaty of Madrid ====
After the signing of the Treaty of Madrid in 1750, the Guaraní fought for the rights to their territory in a war lasting from 1754 until 1756. This treaty mandated the displacement of numerous Guaraní people living in areas controlled by the Spanish monarchy. The treaty granted the Portuguese monarchy the rights to specific areas previously under Spanish control. The Portuguese complied with the treaty with the condition that the Guaraní people would be removed. In other words, in spite of the Guaraní being central to the stipulations of the treaty, they were completely absent from negotiation processes. The treaty was not upheld after 1761. As a result, the only purpose the treaty fulfilled was the displacement and death of numerous Guaraní people and the destruction of their communities.

==== Jesuits expelled ====
In 1767, the Jesuits were expelled from Spanish dominions by royal edict, in part, because of their supposed assistance to the Guaraní in efforts to defend their rights to their territory. Fearing the outcome of this decision, viceroy Antonio María Bucareli y Ursúa entrusted the execution of the mandate in 1768 to two officers with a force of 500 troops. Despite their mission army of 14,000, the Jesuits submitted without resistance. Guarani caciques from Mission San Luis wrote a letter to the Governor of Buenos Aires on February 28, 1768, to ask for the Jesuits to stay. They wrote, "The fathers of the Company of Jesus know how to get along with us, and we with them, we are happy serving God and the King." The Guarani request was denied, but the letter highlights the value of the relationship the Jesuits and Guarani had established in the region.

==== Decline of the reductions ====
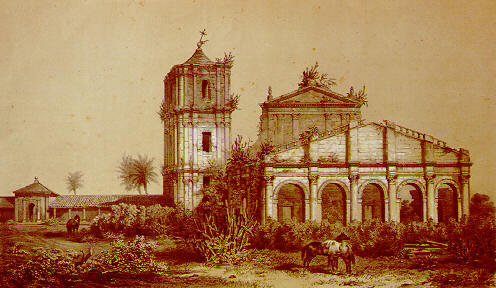
Ruins of the church at São Miguel das Missões, Rio Grande do Sul, Brazil.

The missions were turned over to priests of other orders, chiefly Franciscans, but under a code of regulations drawn up by the viceroy and modeled largely on the Jesuit system. Under chaotic political regulation, the missions rapidly declined. Most Guaranis returned to the countryside. According to the official census of 1801, fewer than 45,000 Guaranis remained; cattle, sheep, and horses had disappeared; the fields and orchards were overgrown or cut down, and the churches were in ruins. The long period of revolutionary struggle that followed completed the destruction. In 1814, the mission Indians numbered 8,000, and in 1848 the few who remained were declared citizens.

==== Aftermath ====
A 2018 study in The Quarterly Journal of Economics found that "in areas of former Jesuit presence—within the Guarani area—educational attainment was higher and remains so (by 10–15%) 250 years later. These educational differences have also translated into incomes that are 10% higher today. The identification of the positive effect of the Guarani Jesuit missions emerges after comparing them with abandoned Jesuit missions and neighboring Franciscan Guarani missions. The enduring effects observed are consistent with transmission mechanisms of structural transformation, occupational specialization, and technology adoption in agriculture."

=== Cultural preservation ===
Today, the Guarani language is an official language of Paraguay and Bolivia. As of 2012, an estimated 90% of the people in Paraguay spoke Guarani.

=== Slavery ===
The center depot of the slave trade was the town of São Paulo. Originally a rendezvous place for Portuguese and Dutch pirates, it later became a refuge for criminals, who mixed with Native American and African women and actively participated in the capturing and selling of Guaranis as slaves.

To oppose these armed and organized robbers, the tribes had only their bows and arrows. Many Guaranis were slain or enslaved by the slave hunters active in Brazil during those years.

=== Eastern Bolivian Guaraní ===
The Guaraní people in Bolivia, called Chiriguanos, lived in the foothills of the Andes and had a different history than most other Guaraní people. Noted for their warlike character, the Chiriguanos were hostile in turn to the Inca Empire, the Spanish, and the independent state of Bolivia from the late 15th to the late 19th century. The Jesuit missions had little success among the Chiriguanos, although Franciscans in the 19th century attracted numerous converts. The Chririguanos were not finally pacified until the defeat in 1892 of forces led by their messianic leader Apiaguaiki Tumpa in the Battle of Kuruyuki.

== Today ==
=== Argentina ===
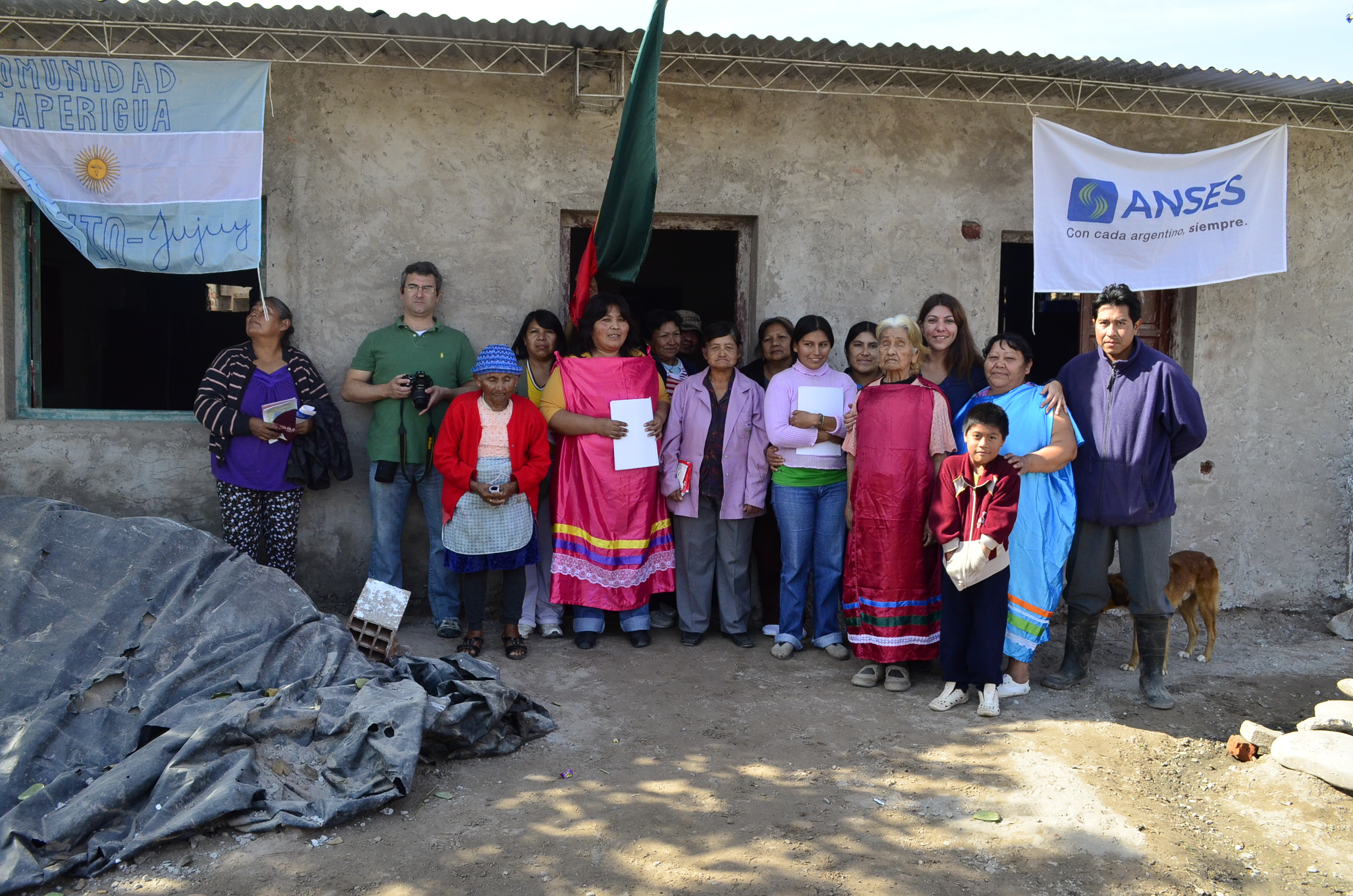
A Guarani community called Taperigua, in Rodeíto, San Pedro, Jujuy, at the Calilegua National Park, Argentina

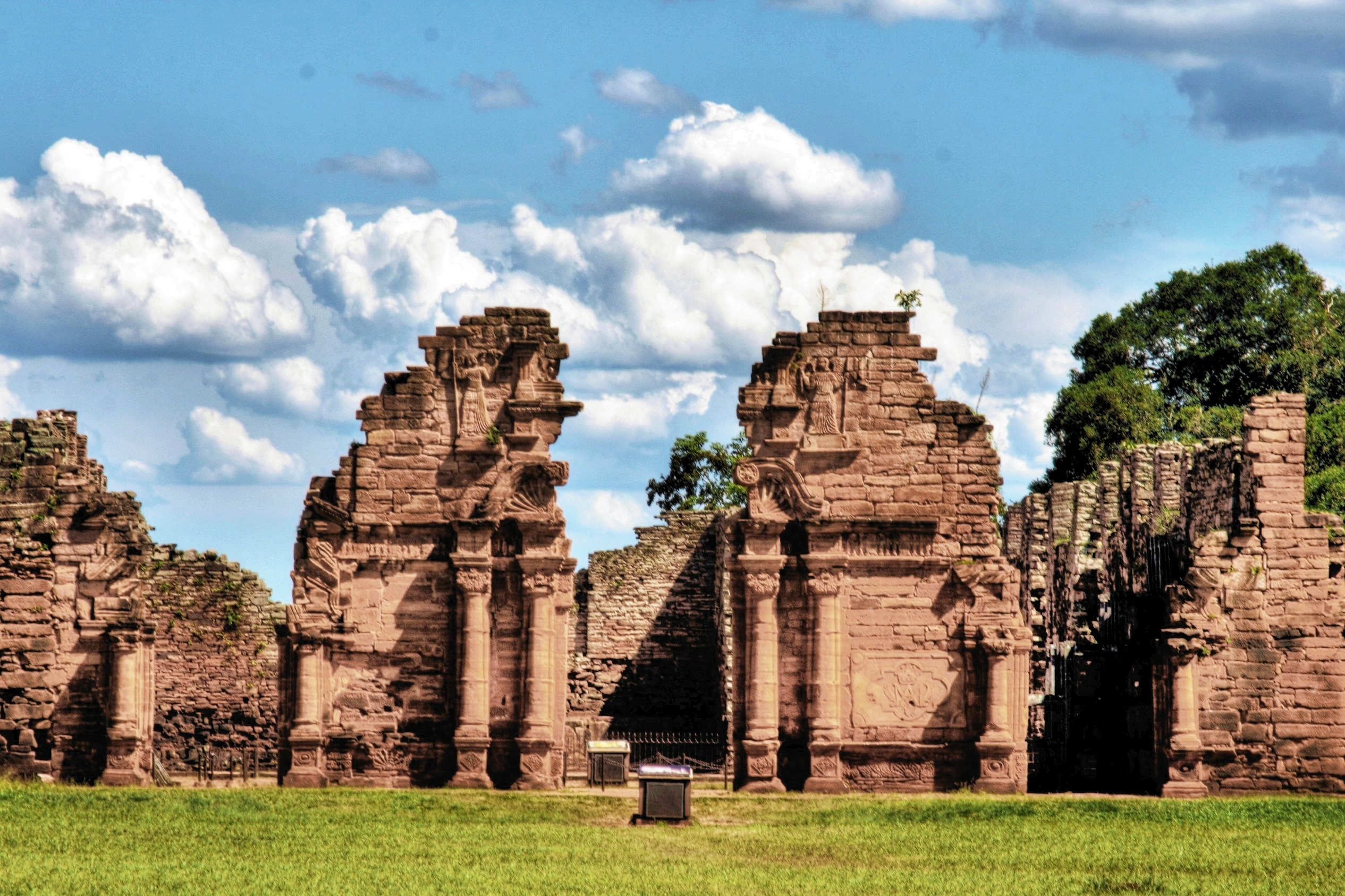
The Ruins of San Ignacio Miní, part of the Jesuit Missions of the Guarani people, near the Ruins of Jesús de Tavarangue. Today, a tourist spot.

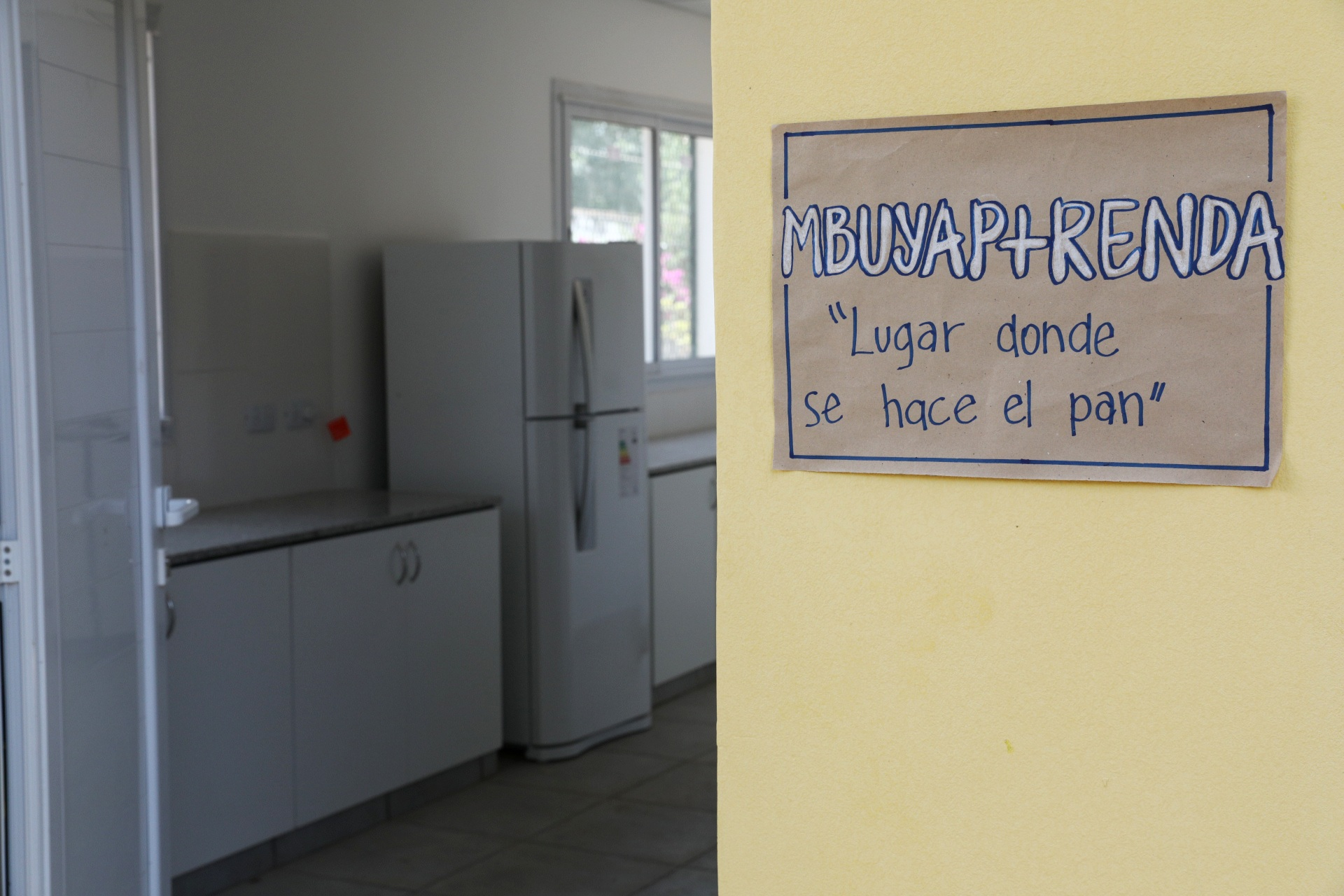
A sign in Guarani language at the kitchen of a bakery, in Posadas. As it is described in Spanish, the literal translation is: place where bread is made

Indigenous Guarani in Argentina fight to protect their ancestral lands from illegal logging and government neglect. A group formed by members of the Guarani community called "Los Rumberos," or “The Patrollers,” safeguard the forest to deter further encroachment.

=== Paraguay ===
The Guarani people and culture persist. Many are descendants of mission exiles. In Paraguay, Guarani lineage predominates in the population and the Guarani language is spoken in most departments to this day.

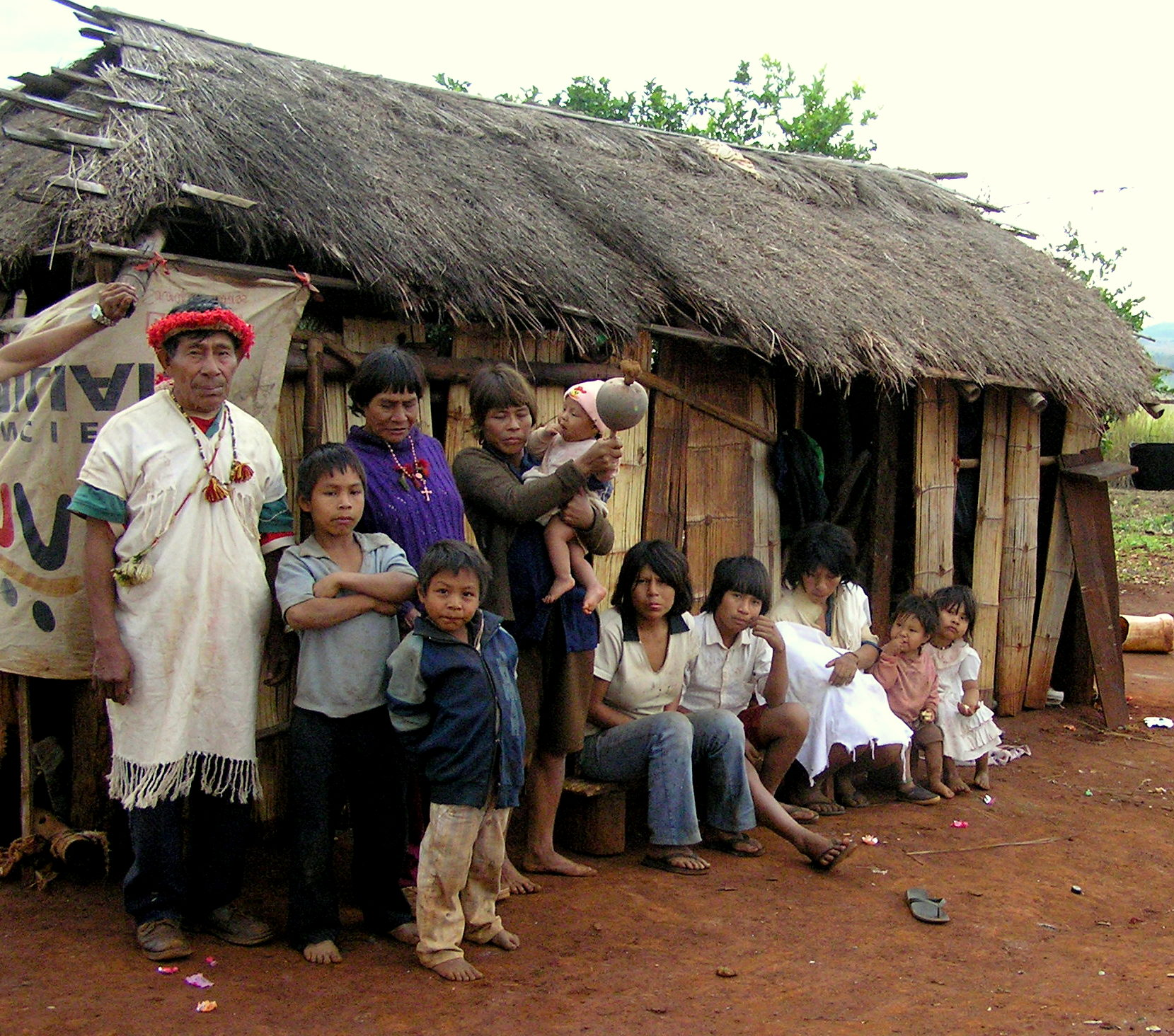
Pai Tavytera people in Amambay Department, Paraguay, 2012

=== Bolivia ===
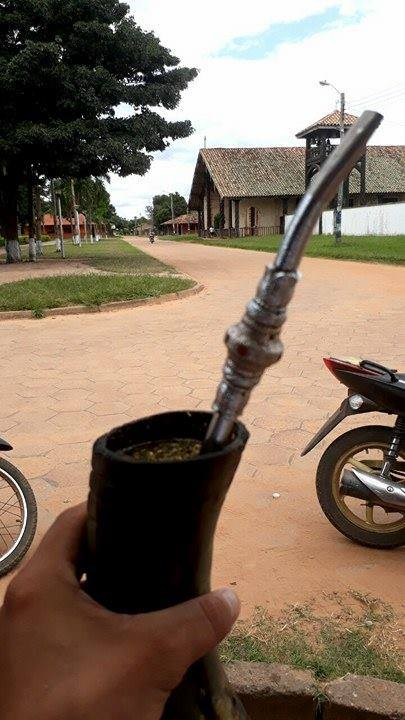
Tereré, a typical Guarani infusion of yerba mate, being taken in San Rafael de Velasco, a historical territory of the Guarani in Bolivia.

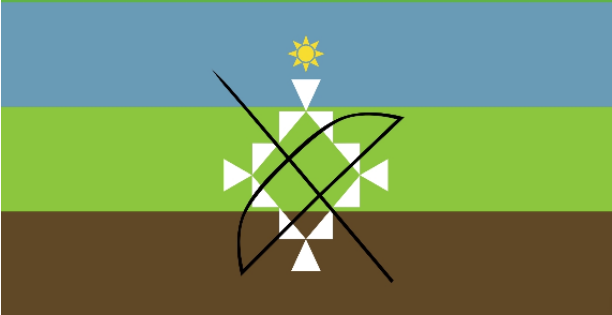
The flag of the Autonomous Guarani Territory of Charagua Iyambae, Bolivia

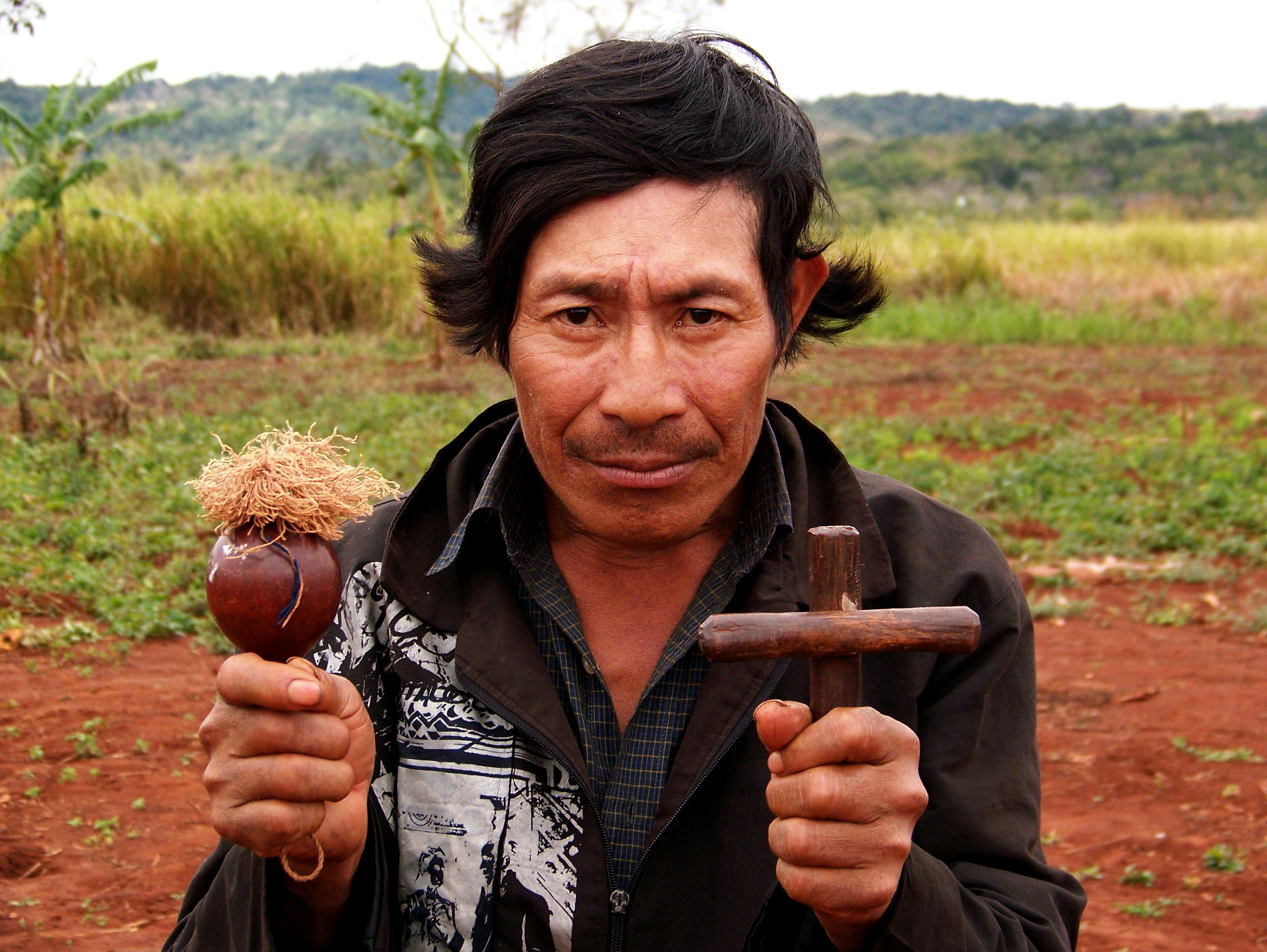
Guarani medicine man holding cross and maraca

The Eastern Bolivian Guarani, being one of many Indigenous peoples in Bolivia, live in the Gran Chaco, near the Pilcomayo River, in southeastern Bolivia close to the Paraguayan and Argentine borders, including portions of Santa Cruz, Chuquisaca, Tarija Departments. This region reaches nearly as far north as Santa Cruz de la Sierra and includes portions of the Guapay, Parapetí, and Ɨtɨka Guasu (or Pilcomayo) River valleys. The Bolivian Guarani are represented by the Assembly of the Guarani People. Some Guarani placenames in Bolivia: Yacuiba, Paraimiri, Itaimbeguasu, Tatarenda, Saipurú, Capirenda, Itay, Ibamiragera, Carandaytí, Ipaguasú, Abapó, Timboy, Caraparí, Urubichá, Kuruguakua, Guanay, Yaguarú and Rogagua.

There are three principal subgroups of Guarani in Bolivia, marked by dialectical and historical differences:

- Around fifty thousand Ava Guarani principally in the Andean foothills. Ava means man in Guarani, and thus Ava Guarani has become the name for numerous Guarani ethnic groups in Paraguay and Brazil.
- Simba (Quechua: braid) Guarani who live near the Pilcomayo River and have been identified by men maintaining a tradition of braided hair, although most young men no longer uphold this practice. They are sometimes called Guarani katui (Guarani: Guarani par excellence)
- The Izoceño Guarani or Tapɨi of Izozog who live in the region of Ɨsoso or Izozo on the Parapetí River

The Bolivian Guarani make use of their own justice system in addition to ordinary law. This indigenous parallel justice aimes at reconciliation and communal peace. However, it includes drastic measures as corporal punishment and the death penalty (which has not been imposed since decades).

== Language ==
A Guarani speaker.

Today, the Standard Paraguayan Guarani is flourishing in Paraguay and is taught in 12 countries.

The growing Paraguayan immigration to Argentina has led to a cultural enhancement of the Guarani peoples in Argentina. It can also be seen in Spain, due to the intense Paraguayan immigration to Spain.

The language was also used by other tribes in regions like the Paraguayan Chaco and Northern Argentina.

== Notable Guaraní people ==
- Juliana, a 16th-century woman known for killing her Spanish master and urging other Indigenous women to do the same.
- Sepé Tiarayú, a Guaraní War leader popularly venerated as a saint in Brazil and Argentina.
- Andrés Guazurary, popularly known as Andresito, a caudillo and governor of the province of Misiones in Argentina.

== See also ==
- Guarana (plant)
- Guaraní (currency)
- Guarani-Kaiowa
- Guarani mythology
- Guarani alphabet
- Guarani language
- Guarani War
- Indigenous peoples in Brazil
- Jesuit Reductions
- Tupi people
- Encomienda
- Mapuche
- Paraguayan guaraní
- Academy of the Guarani Language
- Indigenous peoples in Argentina
- Jesuit missions among the Guaraní
- Indigenous peoples in Paraguay
