= Monteagudo Municipality =

Coordinates: 20°02′S 64°05′W

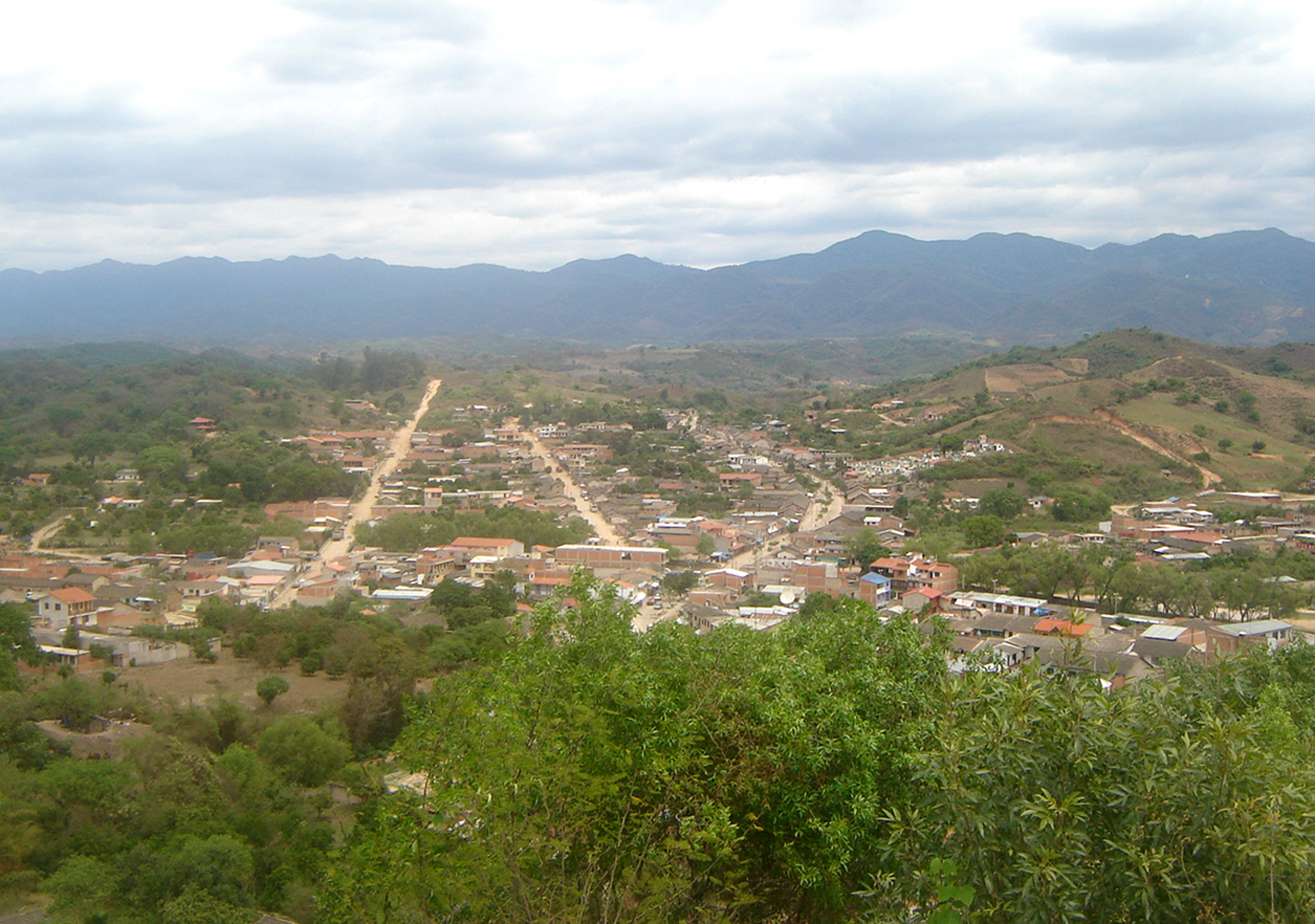
Panoramic view of Monteagudo

Municipality Municipality is the first municipal section of Hernando Siles Province in the Chuquisaca Department in Bolivia. Its seat is Monteagudo.

== Languages ==
The languages spoken in the Monteagudo Municipality are mainly Spanish, Quechua, Guaraní and Aymara.

Language	Inhabitants
Quechua	2,745
Aymara	128
Guaraní	758
Another native	5
Spanish	24,689
Foreign	163
Only native	314
Native and Spanish	3,223
Only Spanish	21,469
