= Apiaguaiki Tumpa =

Guaraní leader from Bolivia (c. 1863–1892)

Apiaguaiki Tumpa (c. 1863 – 29 March 1892) was a messianic leader of the Eastern Bolivian Guarani (Chiriguanos) people of Bolivia. He is regarded by many Guarani as a national hero, known for his struggle to defend his peoples' land and liberty from the encroaching Bolivian government, cattle ranchers, and missionaries. He was executed after his defeat and the failure of his revolt. His death is commemorated annually by many Guarani, and a Guaraní language university in the community of Kuruyuki, Bolivia is named after him.

== Early life ==
Apiaguaiki was probably born in 1863 in the community of Yohay, a few miles northeast of Boyuibe in Santa Cruz Department, Bolivia. His mother was a servant for one of the large Creole (white or mixed blood Bolivians) cattle ranchers in the region. The identify of his father is unknown. His birth name was Chapiaguasu.

When Chapiaguasa was about 10 years old he apparently fled with his mother from the ranch and took up residence among a group of traditional Guarani, more commonly called "Chiriguanos" at that time, in a community called Murukuyati. He was probably present when Creoles killed a large number of Guarani in November 1877, including his mother, in the massacre of Murukuyati. Subsequently, Chapiaguasa acquired the rudiments of Christianity at the Franciscan mission of Santa Rosa, near the town of Cuevo, served as a messenger for Chiriquano leaders, and became a shaman. He acquired a reputation as a healer. In 1891, he became the leader of the community of Ivo, titled himself Apiaguaiki, the "eunuch of God." and was selected by the Chiriguanos in Ivo to be "Tumpa" - a prophet or holy man. Thus, he became a rival of the Franciscan missionaries in the nearby Santa Rosa mission who claimed a monopoly of the healing arts and spiritual matters.

== The war of 1892 ==
For 400 years, the Chiriguanos had resisted the encroachment on their lands and culture by the Inca Empire, the Spanish Empire, and the independent country of Bolivia. However, from the 1860s onward the pressure on them from Creole ranchers and settlers and Franciscan missionaries increased. Many Chiriguanos became Christians and Creole ranchers took over many of their traditional lands. They were defeated in the Huacaya War of 1874-1877.

Apiaguaiki rose to power as a messianic leader of a millenarian movement. Typically, millenarian movements predict a return to an imagined golden age of a culture and the defeat of enemies by supernatural forces. These movements are especially common among people living under colonialism or other disruptive and oppressive forces.

By the end of 1891, Apiaguaiki had assembled what a missionary estimated (probably exaggerated) as 5,000 men, plus women and children, in the community of Kuruyuki or Curuyuqui, 13 kilometres (8.1 mi) from the Santa Rosa mission. The rape and murder of a Chiriguano girl on December 31 1891 by the mayor of Cuevo set off the revolt. After some success in early ambushes, on January 21, 1892 Apiaguaiki led an assault on the Santa Rosa mission which failed. The Bolivian soldiers, creole volunteers, and Christian Indians counterattacked on January 28 in the Battle of Kuruyuki. Apiaguiaki was soundly defeated.

== Execution ==
In the aftermath of the Battle of Kuruyuki, the soldiers, Creoles, and Christian Indians hunted down and killed an estimated 6,000 Chiriguanos. A month after the battle Apiaguaiki was betrayed by a supporter and captured. He was tortured and executed by a firing squad on March 29, 1892 in Sauces, present day Monteagudo. The official report of his execution said that "Apiaguaiki died with the haughtiness of a great leader."

With the death of Apiaguaiki, armed resistance by the Eastern Bolivian Guarani or Chiriguanos to the Bolivian government, the Creole settlers, and the Franciscan missionaries ended.

== University ==
In 2009, Bolivian president Evo Morales attended a commemoration of the Battle of Kuruyuki and inaugurated the "Apiaguaki Tumpa Indigenous University of the Lowlands" located in the community of Kuruyuki, now more commonly spelled Quruyuqui.

== See also ==
- India Juliana
- Sepé Tiaraju

== Bibliography ==
- Saignes, Thierry (2007), ed. Isabelle Combes, Historia del pueblo chiriguano, Lima, Peru: Instituto Frances de Estudios Andinos. ISBN 9789995410674.
- Langer, Erick D. (2009), Expecting Pears from an Elm Tree, Durham, NC: Duke University Press. ISBN 978-0-8223-4504-6.
