= Yaguarú =

- Town
- Location within Bolivia
- Coordinates: 15°19′00″S 63°35′00″W
- Country: Bolivia
- Department: Santa Cruz
- Province: Guarayos

Population (2012)
  - Total: 2,430
- Time zone: UTC-4 (BOT)
- Climate: Aw

Yaguarú is a small town in the department of Santa Cruz in Bolivia. The town's name means "wolf", in Guarani. In 2012, the town had a population of 2,430.
