= Hernando Siles Province =

Hernando Siles
- Province
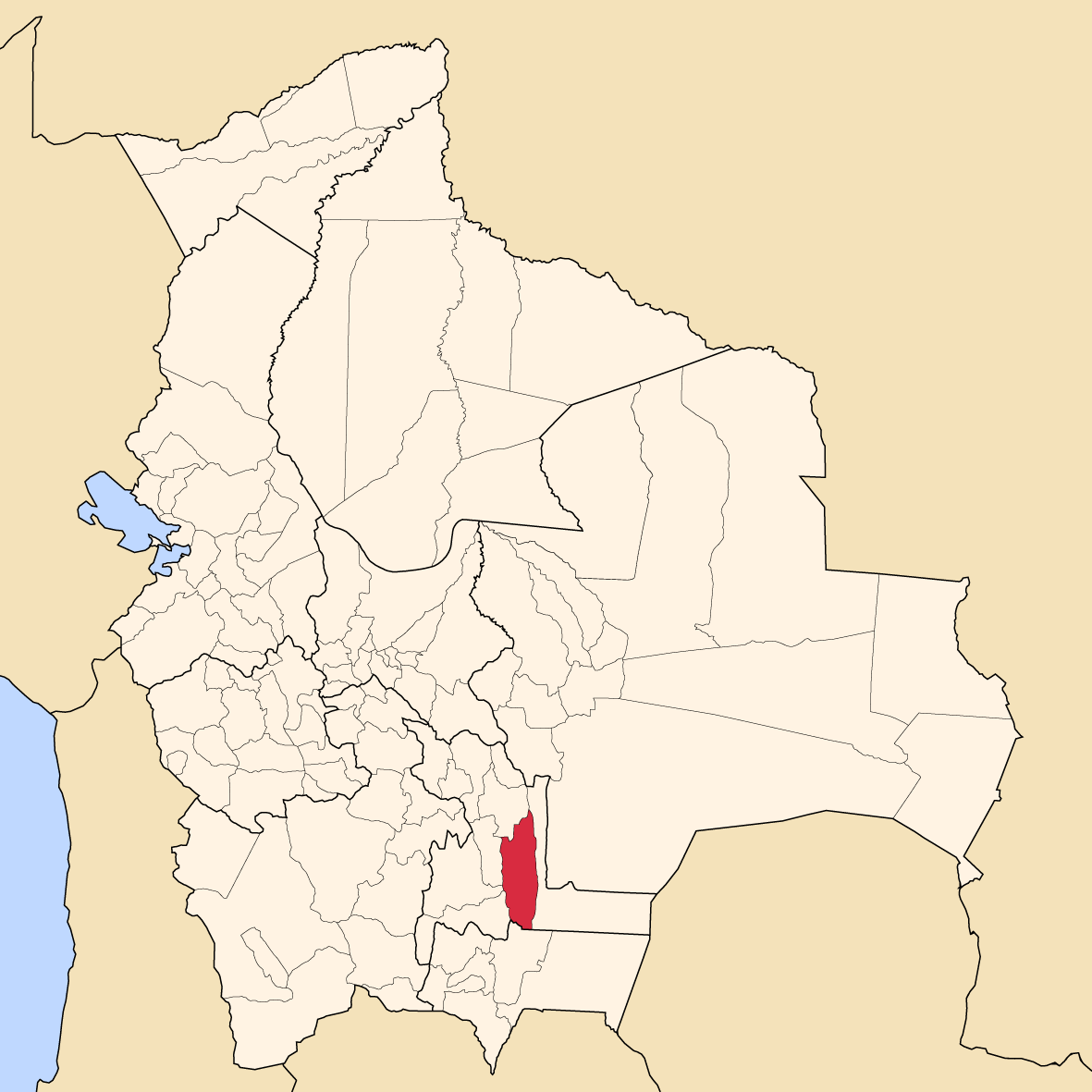
- Location of Hernando Siles Province within Bolivia
- Coordinates: 20.333°S 64.083°W
- Country: Bolivia
- Department: Chuquisaca

Area
  - Total: 6,350 km^{2} (2,450 sq mi)

Population
  - Total: 31,688
  - Density: 4.99/km^{2} (12.9/sq mi)
- Time zone: UTC-4 (Bolivia Time)

Hernando Siles is a province of the department of Chuquisaca, Bolivia. In the 2024 census it had a population of 31,688. It covers an area of 5,473 km², giving it a population density of 6.67/km². Its capital is Monteagudo.

== Subdivision ==
The province is divided into two municipalities which are further subdivided into cantons.

Section	Municipality	Cantons	Seat
1st	Monteagudo Municipality		Monteagudo
		Monteagudo	Monteagudo
		San Juan del Piray	San Juan del Pirai
2nd	Huacareta Municipality		Huacareta
		Animbo	Animbo
		Huacareta	Huacareta
		Rosario del Ingre	Rosario del Ingre
