= Monteagudo, Bolivia =

Monteagudo
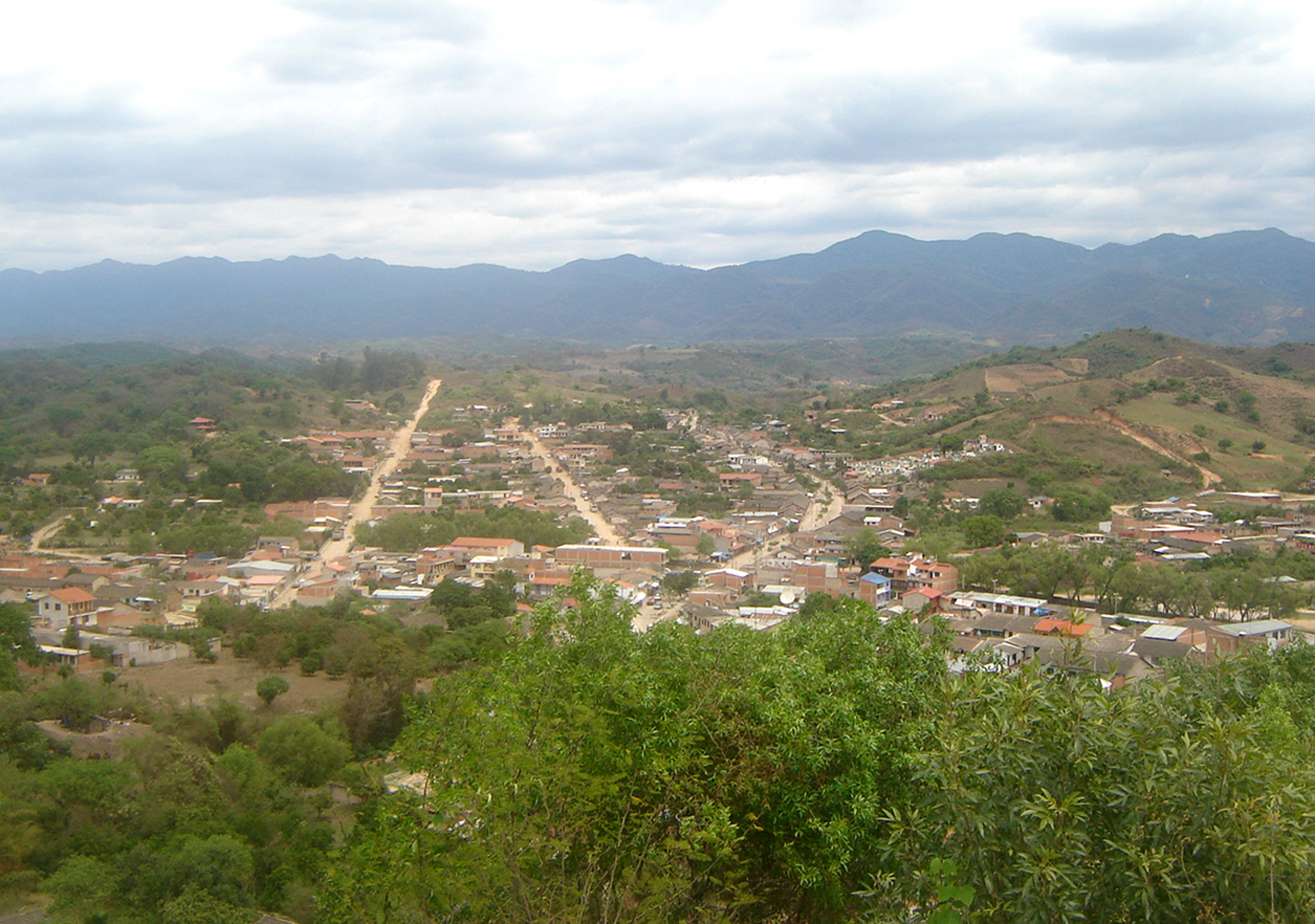
- Monteagudo Panorama

- Location in Bolivia
- Coordinates: 19°48′17″S 63°57′22″W
- Country: Bolivia
- Department: Chuquisaca
- Province: Hernando Siles
- Elevation: 1,133 m (3,717 ft)

Population (2008)
  - Urban: 7,500
- Time zone: UTC-4 (BOT)

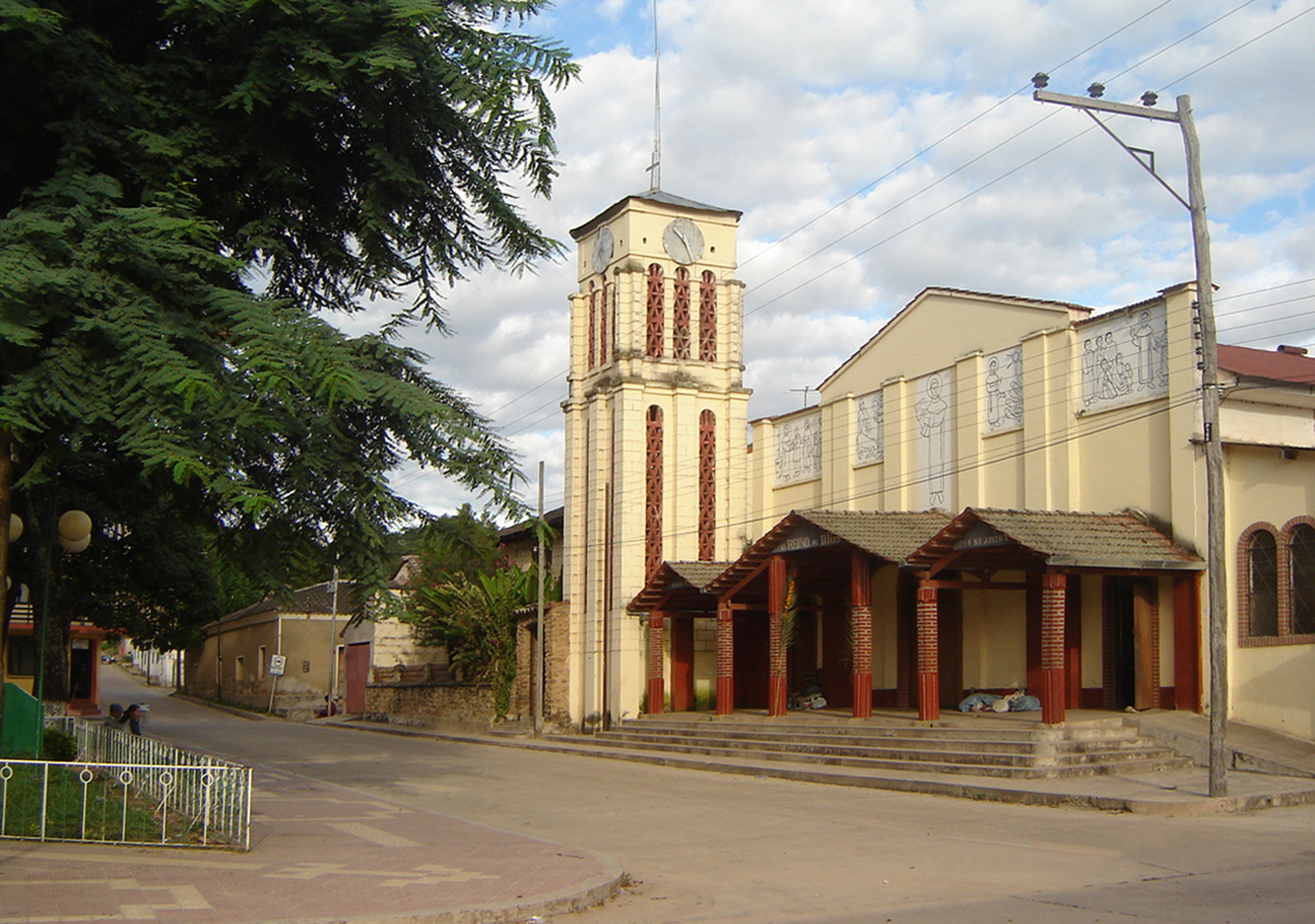
Monteagudo Church

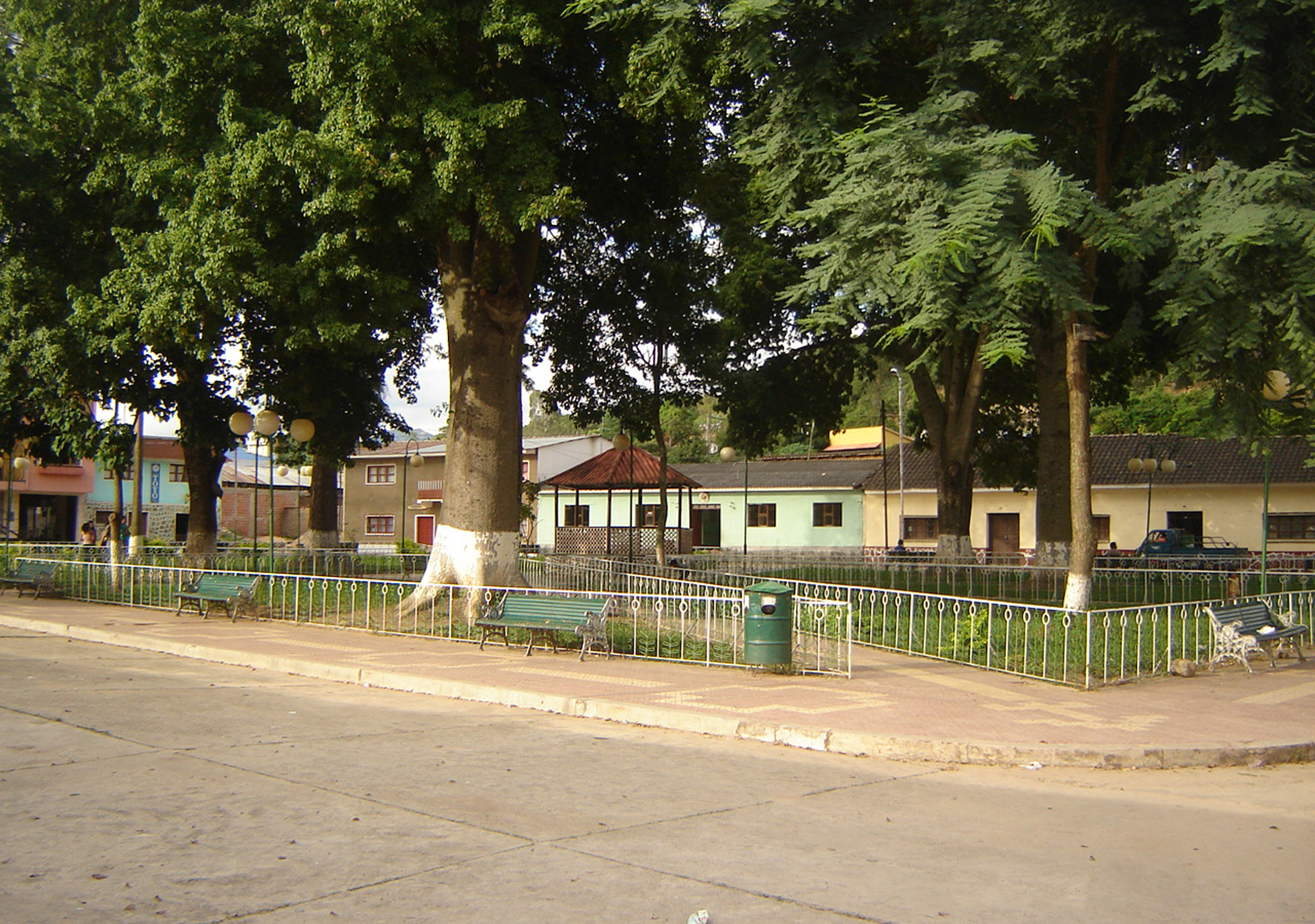
Monteagudo Square

Monteagudo is a small town in South Eastern Bolivia. Its name is dedicated to Bernardo de Monteagudo Cáceres (1789-1825) who took part in the Chuquisaca revolution of 25 May 1809.

== Location ==
Monteagudo is administrative center of the Hernando Siles Province in the Chuquisaca Department. It is located in the Monteagudo Municipality on the mouth of Río Sauces into Río Bañado, framed by mountain ridges running from North to South abounding with vegetation.

== Climate ==
Monteagudo is situated in the humid, sub-Andean Chaco of Bolivia. The climate in the Köppen Classification system is Cwa (sub-tropical with hot summers and dry winters). The months of June to September are characterized by a distinct dry season, while December and January can have heavy rainfalls.

Climate data for Monteagudo (Monteagudo El Banado), elevation 1,117 m (3,665 ft)
Month	Jan	Feb	Mar	Apr	May	Jun	Jul	Aug	Sep	Oct	Nov	Dec	Year
Mean daily maximum °C (°F)	30.4 (86.7)	29.7 (85.5)	28.9 (84.0)	26.4 (79.5)	24.1 (75.4)	22.9 (73.2)	23.9 (75.0)	26.3 (79.3)	28.6 (83.5)	30.4 (86.7)	30.3 (86.5)	30.6 (87.1)	27.7 (81.9)
Daily mean °C (°F)	23.9 (75.0)	23.4 (74.1)	22.8 (73.0)	20.6 (69.1)	17.8 (64.0)	16.0 (60.8)	15.4 (59.7)	17.1 (62.8)	19.6 (67.3)	22.3 (72.1)	23 (73)	23.8 (74.8)	20.5 (68.8)
Mean daily minimum °C (°F)	17.4 (63.3)	17.1 (62.8)	16.7 (62.1)	14.8 (58.6)	11.5 (52.7)	8.8 (47.8)	6.8 (44.2)	7.9 (46.2)	10.5 (50.9)	14.2 (57.6)	15.7 (60.3)	16.9 (62.4)	13.2 (55.7)
Average precipitation mm (inches)	161.0 (6.34)	162.2 (6.39)	128.0 (5.04)	73.1 (2.88)	25.4 (1.00)	15.3 (0.60)	9.4 (0.37)	7.4 (0.29)	20.9 (0.82)	62.9 (2.48)	80.0 (3.15)	143.8 (5.66)	889.4 (35.02)
Average precipitation days	11.2	10.9	11.0	8.7	7.3	5.6	3.7	2.6	3.6	6.7	8.5	10.5	90.3
Average relative humidity (%)	70.8	73.0	74.0	76.6	76.6	75.4	68.1	61.1	58.7	60.0	63.0	68.7	68.8
Source: Servicio Nacional de Meteorología e Hidrología de Bolivia

== History ==
Monteagudo was originally named Sauces and was prominent in the frequent wars between Creole (white and mixed blood) settlers, the Spanish Empire, and the independent country of Bolivia against the Eastern Bolivian Guarani people (more commonly called Chiriguanos). In 1728, a Chiriguano army attacked Sauces, burned the church, and captured 80 Spaniards. On March 29, 1892, Apiaguaiki Tumpa the last Chiriguano war leader was executed in Monteagudo.

== Infrastructure ==
To the west, Monteagudo is connected with the capital of Sucre by the inner-Bolivian highway Ruta 6. As less than one third of the road is paved, coaches take eight hours for the distance of 326 km in dry weather, while in rainy weather the outcome of the journey is uncalculable.

To the north-east, Monteagudo is connected with Santa Cruz, the capital of the neighboring Santa Cruz Department. The unpaved Ruta 6 goes east to Ipati (104 km) and connects the town with highway Ruta 9, which leads north to Santa Cruz over another 255 km of paved road.

== Population ==
The population of Monteagudo has increased over the past decade, from 5,130 inhabitants (1992 census) to 7,285 (2001 census). Estimations about the population figures in 2008 differ strongly, from 7,500 to 10,501 inhabitants.
