= Cuevo =

- Town
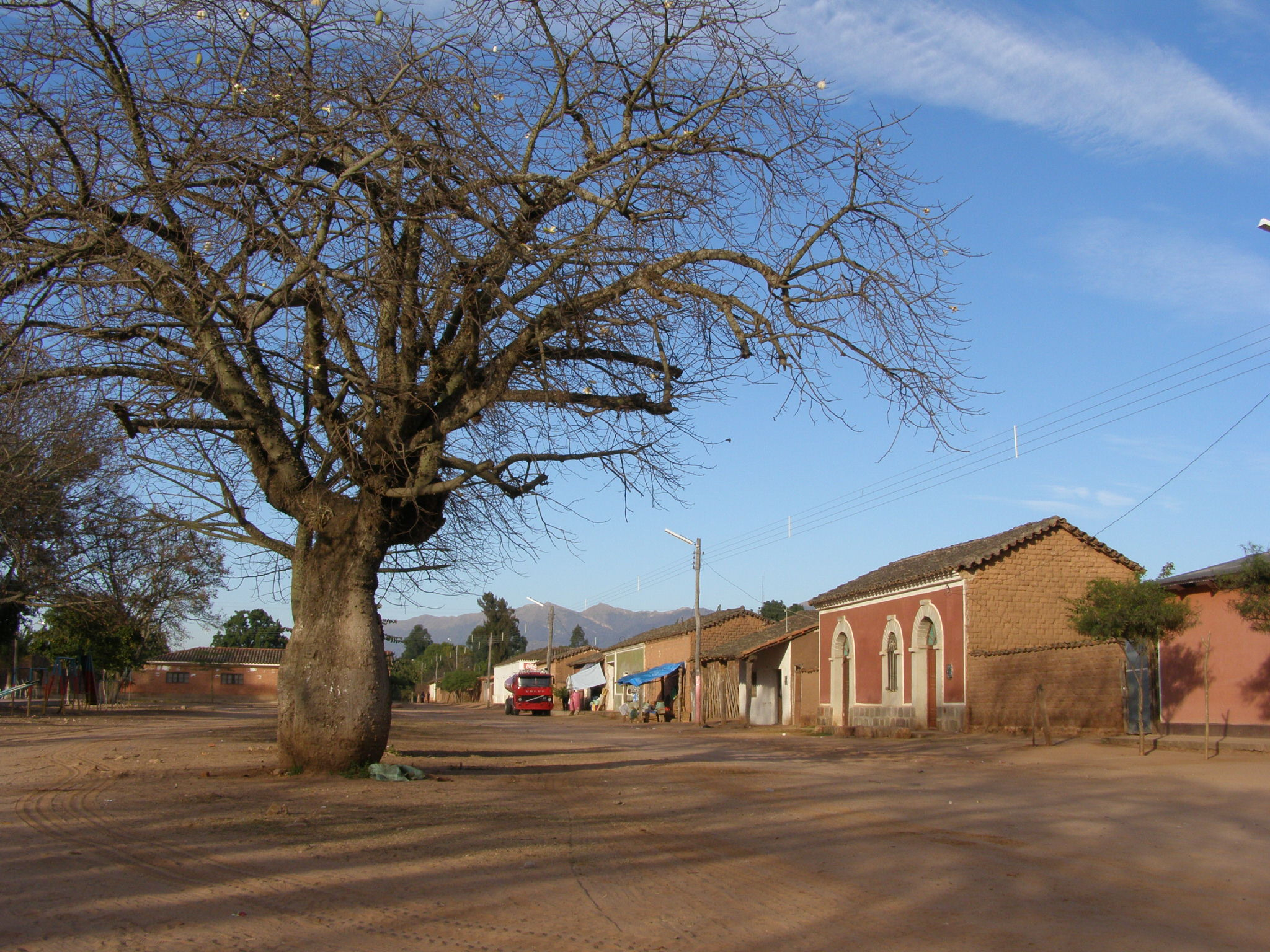
- Interactive map of Cuevo
- Coordinates: 20°27′S 63°31′W
- Country: Bolivia
- Department: Santa Cruz Department
- Province: Cordillera Province
- Elevation: 3,353 ft (1,022 m)

Population (2010)
  - Total: 2,317
- Time zone: UTC-4 (BOT)
- Climate: Cwa

Cuevo is a small town in Santa Cruz Department (Bolivia), Bolivia. In 2010 it had an estimated population of 2,317.
