= Cochabamba =

City and municipality in Bolivia

Cochabamba Quchapampa
- City & Municipality
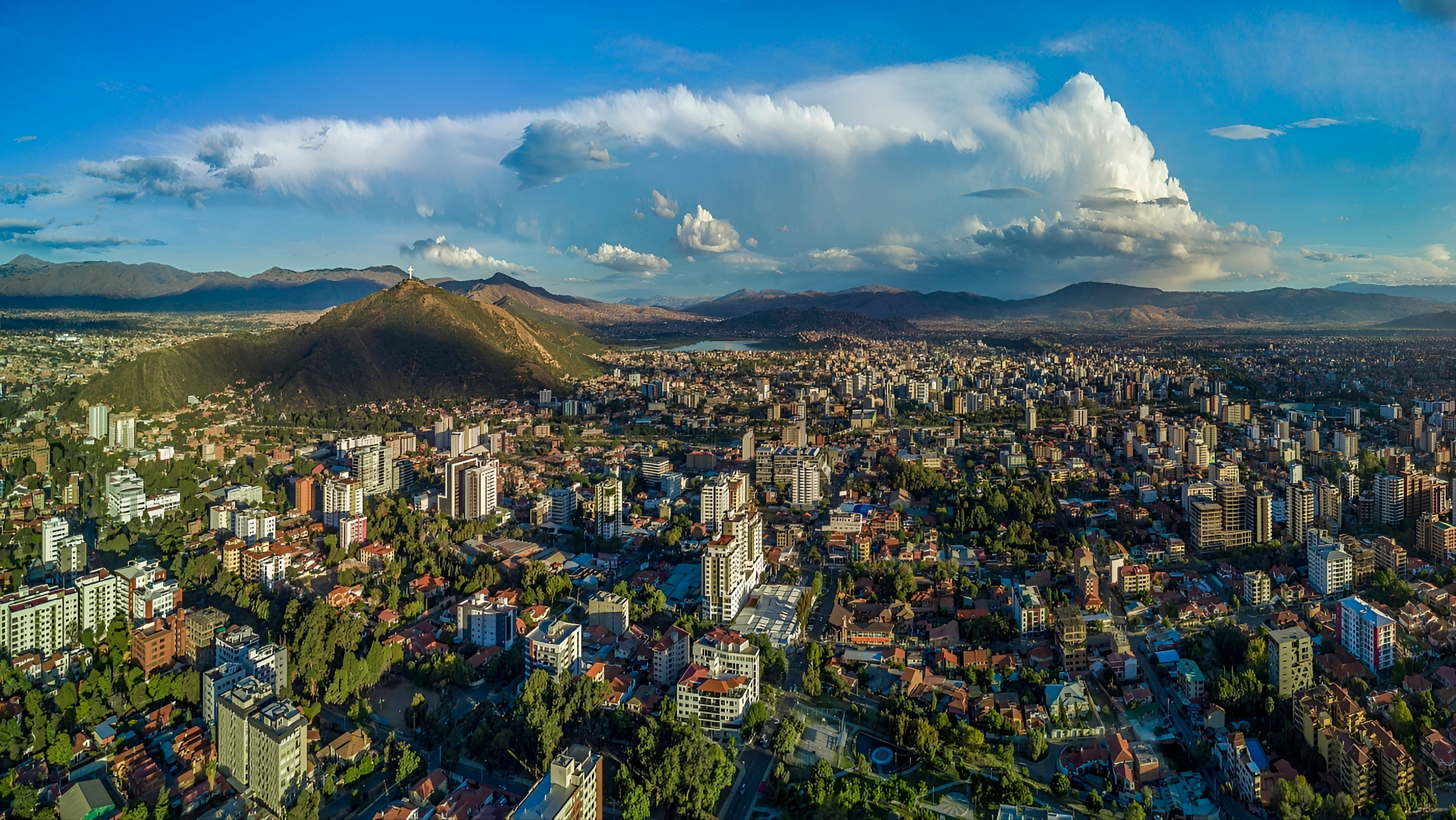
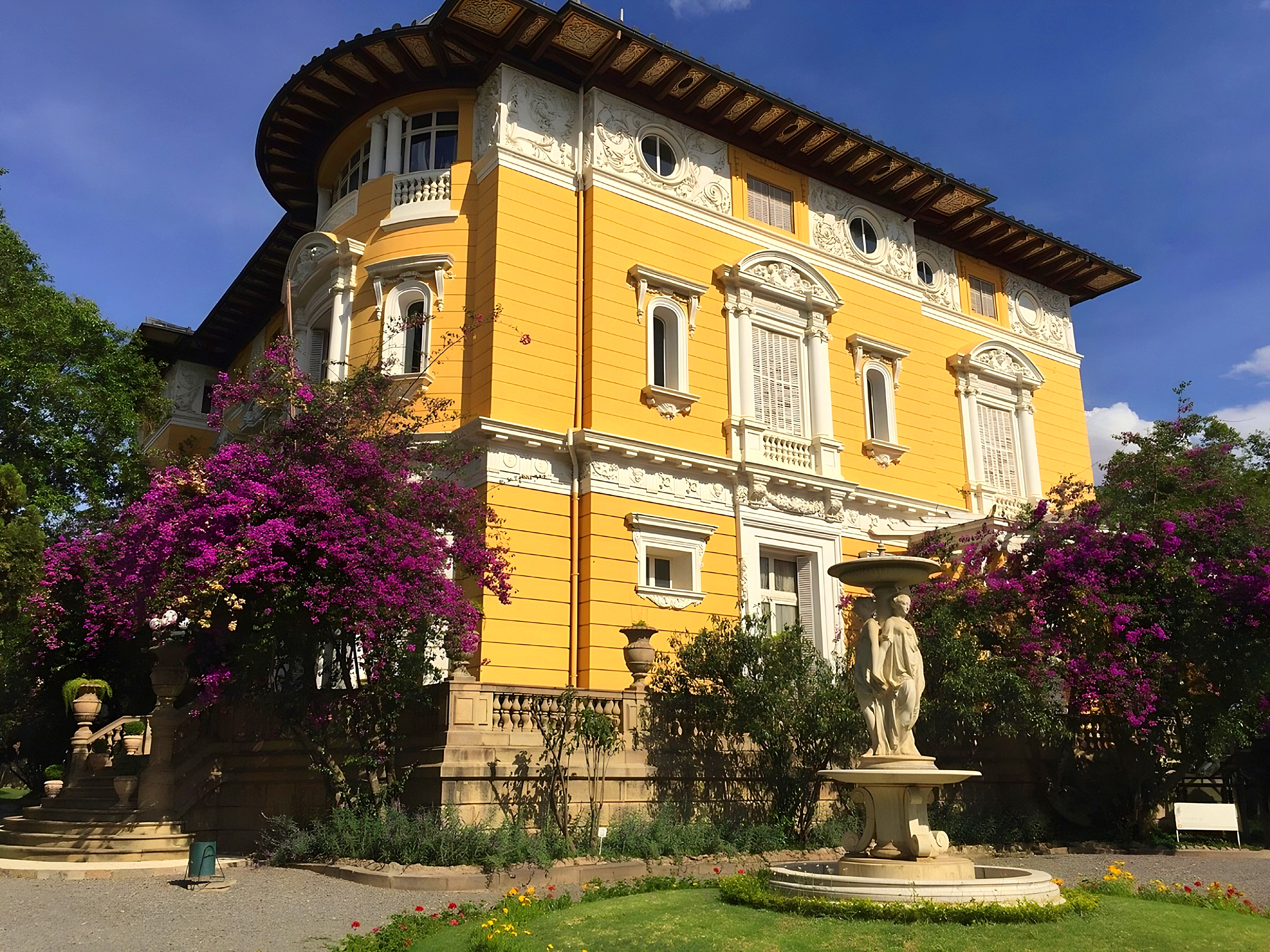
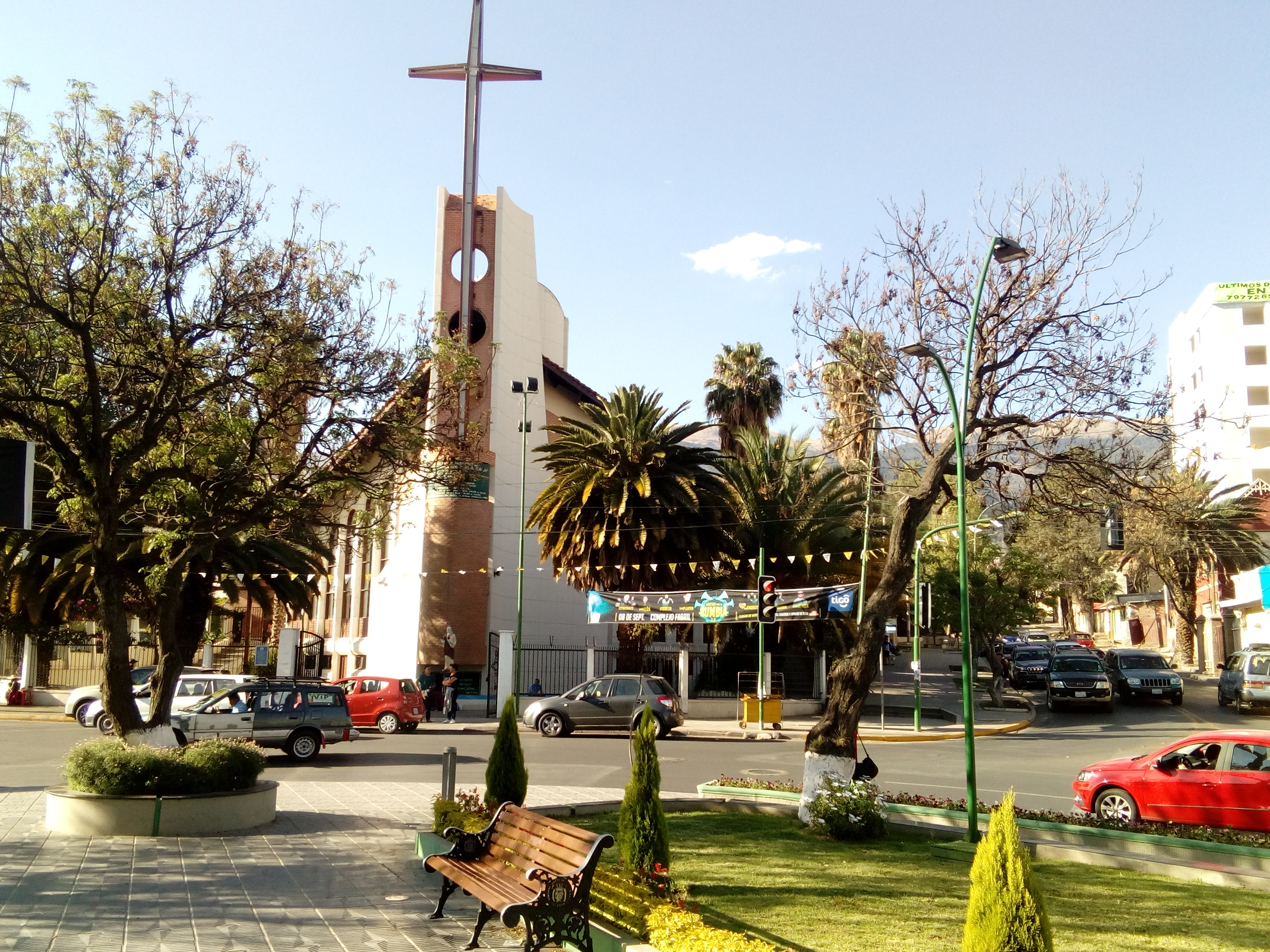
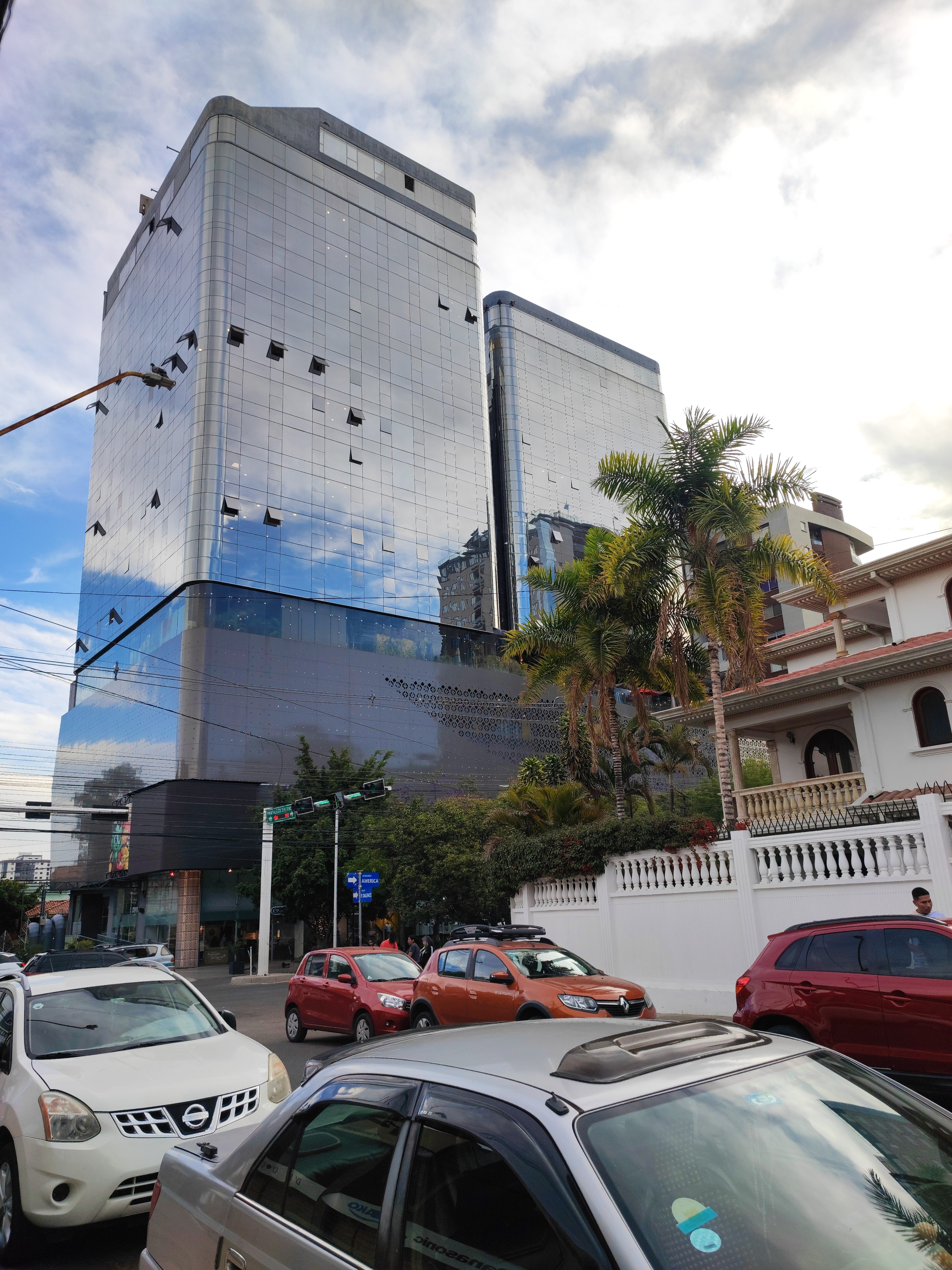
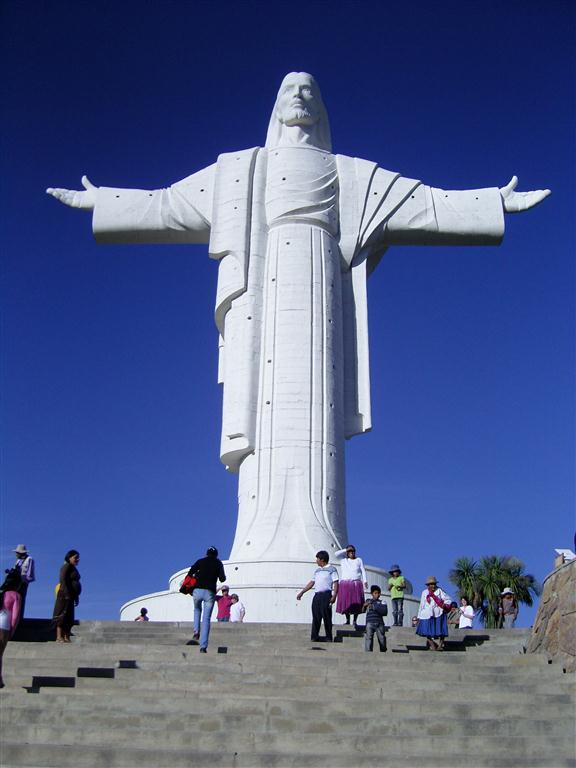
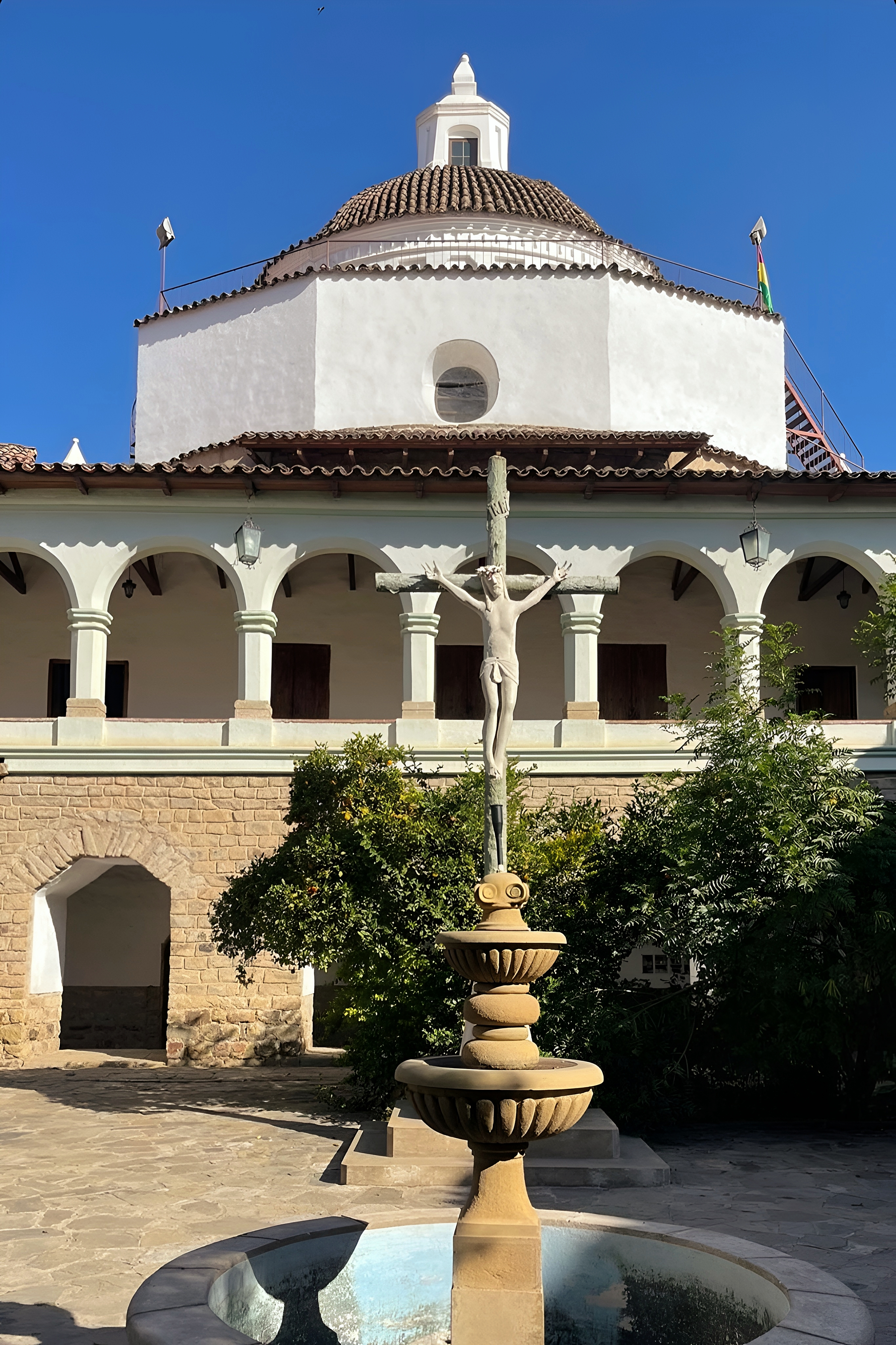
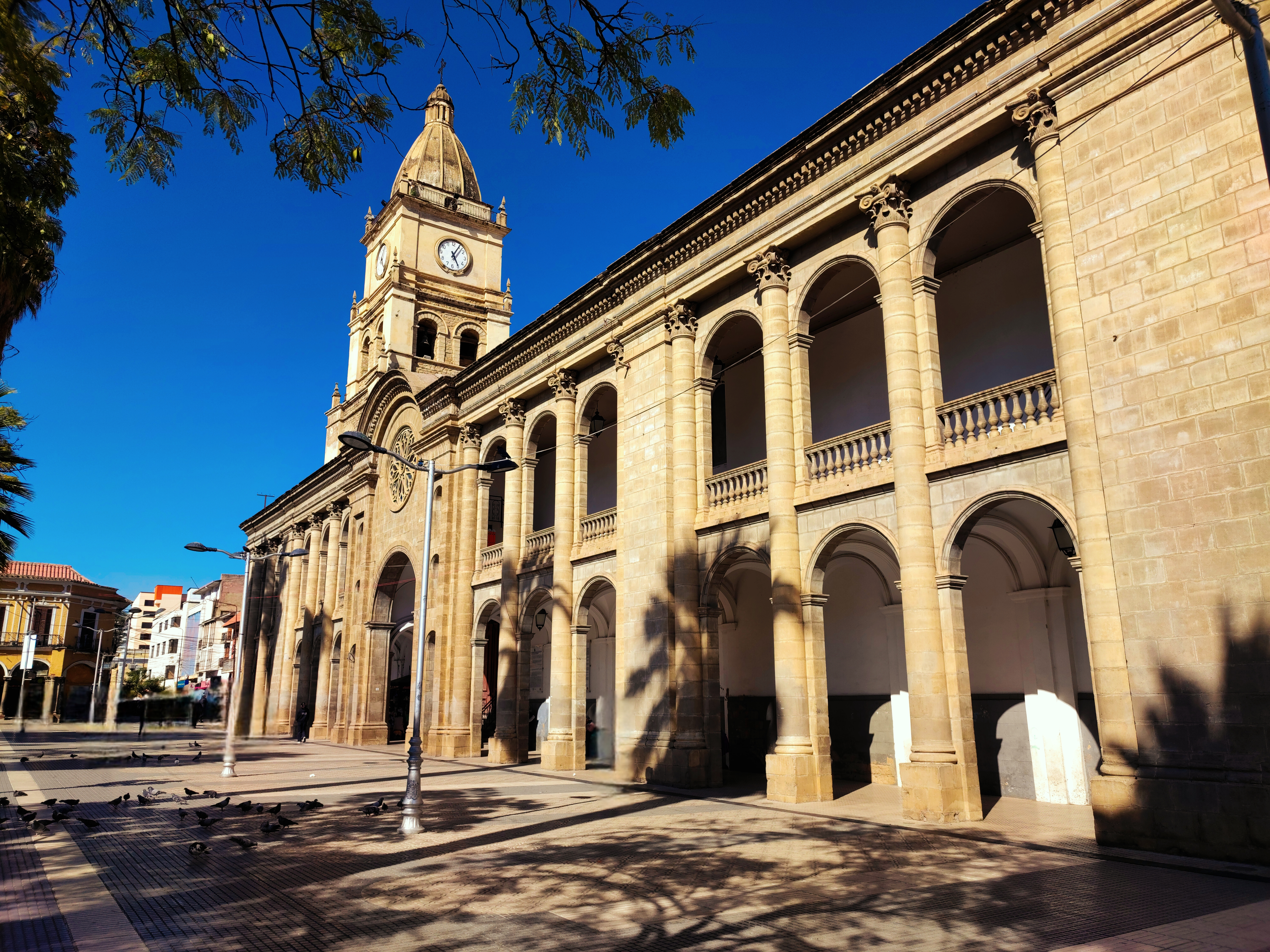
- Aerial view of Cochabamba Portales Palace Church of Santa Ana de Cala Cala Aranjuez Walk Statue of Christ of Concord Santa Teresa Convent Metropolitan Cathedral of Cochabamba

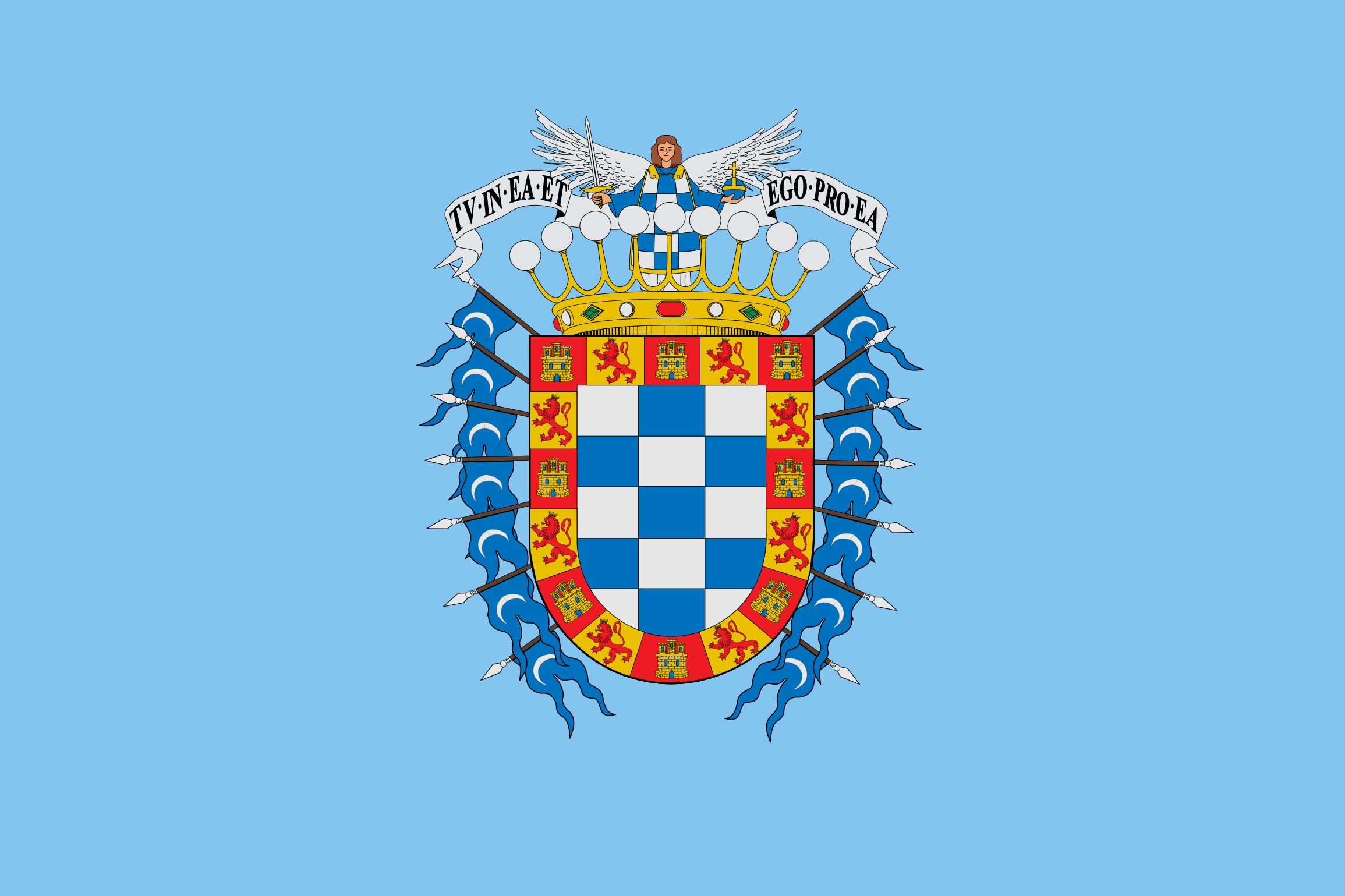
- Flag Coat of arms
- Nicknames: "City of Eternal Spring" "The Garden City" "La Llajta"
- Anthem: Himno a Cochabamba
- Location in Bolivia Cochabamba (South America)
- Coordinates: 17°23′18″S 66°09′35″W
- Country: Bolivia
- Department: Cochabamba
- Province: Cercado Province
- Municipality: Cochabamba
- Founded: 15 August 1571

Government
  - Type: Municipal Autonomous Government
  - Mayor: Manfred Reyes Villa (Súmate)

Area
  - City & Municipality: 170 km^{2} (66 sq mi)
  - Land: 169 km^{2} (65 sq mi)
  - Water: 1 km^{2} (0.39 sq mi)
  - Urban: 111 km^{2} (43 sq mi)
- Elevation: 2,570 m (8,430 ft)

Population (2024 Census)
  - Urban: 661,484 (4th)
  - Urban density: 5,960/km^{2} (15,400/sq mi)
  - Metro: 1,113,437
- Demonym: Cochabambino

GDP (PPP, constant 2015 values)
  - Year: 2023
  - Total (Metro): $11.8 billion
  - Per capita: $8,400
- Time zone: UTC-4 (BOT)
- Climate: BSk
- HDI (2013): 0.804 (Very High)
- Website: Official website

Cochabamba (Aymara and Quechua: Quchapampa) is a city and municipality in central Bolivia in a valley in the Andes mountain range. It is the capital of the Cochabamba Department and the fourth largest city in Bolivia, with a population of 661,484 according to the 2024 Bolivian census. Its name is from a compound of the Quechua words qucha "lake" and pampa, "open plain." Residents of the city and the surrounding areas are commonly referred to as cochalas or, more formally, cochabambinos.

It is known as the "City of Eternal Spring" or "The Garden City" because of its spring-like temperatures all year round. It is also known as "La Llajta," which means "town" in Quechua. It is the largest urban center between the higher capital of La Paz and Santa Cruz de la Sierra in the tropical plains of the east. It sits south-west of the Tunari mountains, and north of the foothills of the Valle Alto. In antiquity, the area featured numerous lakes, which gave the city its name. Many of these lakes have since disappeared to urban development, but Coña Coña and Alalay lakes are extant examples. It has been a populated settlement since the Pre-Inca period, and is today an important cultural, educational, political, and commercial centre.

== History ==
=== Pre-Inca and Inca ===
The valley of Cochabamba has been inhabited for thousands of years due to its fertile productive soils and mild climate. Archaeological evidence suggests that the initial inhabitants were of indigenous ethnic groups: Tiwanaku, Tupuraya, Mojocoya, Omereque, and Inca inhabited the valley at times before the Spanish arrived.

The name Cochabamba is a Spanish spelling of the Quechua compound noun qucha pampa (literally 'lake plain', phonemically /qutʃa pampa/, phonetically [ˈqɔtʃa ˈpampa]). Under the Inca Empire, the area was conquered by Topa Inca Yupanqui (ruled 1471–1493). His son Huayna Capac turned Cochabamba into a large production enclave or state farm to serve the Incas. The local population was possibly depleted during the Inca conquest and Huayna Capac imported 14,000 people, called mitimas, to work the land. The principal crop was maize which could not be grown in much of the high and cold heartland of the Inca Empire. The maize was stored in 2,400 storehouses (qollqas) in the hills overlooking the valley or transported by llama caravan to storage sites in Paria, Cusco, of other Inca administrative centres. Most of the maize was probably used to sustain the Inca army during its campaigns.

=== Spanish and Bolivian ===
The first Spanish inhabitant of the valley was Garci Ruiz de Orellana in 1542. He purchased the majority of the land from local tribal chiefs Achata and Consavana through a title registered in 1552 at the Imperial City of Potosí. The price paid was 130 pesos. His residence, known as the House of Mayorazgo, still stands in the Cala Cala neighbourhood.

The city, called Villa de Oropesa, was founded in January 1571 by order of Viceroy Francisco de Toledo, Count of Oropesa. It was to be an agricultural production centre to provide food and wood for the mining towns of the relatively nearby Altiplano region, particularly Potosí which became one of the largest and richest cities in the world during the 16th and 17th centuries — funding the vast wealth that ultimately made Spain a world power. In fact, anthropologist Jack Weatherford and others have cited the city of Potosí as the birth of capitalism because of the money and materialism it provided Spain. Thus, with the silver mining industry in Potosí at its height, Cochabamba thrived during its first centuries. However, the city entered a period of decline during the 18th century as mining began to wane.

In 1786 King Charles III of Spain renamed the city the 'loyal and valiant' Villa of Cochabamba. This was done to commend the city's pivotal role in suppressing the indigenous rebellions of 1781 in Oruro by sending armed forces to Oruro to quell the uprisings. Since the late 19th century it has again been generally successful as an agricultural centre for Bolivia.

The 1793 census shows that the city had a population of 22,305 persons. There were 12,980 mestizos, 6,368 Spaniards, 1,182 indigenous natives, 1,600 mulattos and 175 African slaves.

In 1812 Cochabamba was the site of a riot against the Spanish Army. On May 27, thousands of women took up arms against the Spanish. According to historian Nathaniel Aguirre: "From Cochabamba, many men have fled. Not one woman. On the hillside, a great clamour. Cochabamba's plebeian women, at bay, fight from the centre of a circle of fire. Surrounded by five thousand Spaniards, they resist with battered tin guns and a few arquebuses; and they fight to the last yell, whose echoes will resound throughout the long war for independence. Whenever his army weakens, General Manuel Belgrano will shout those words which never fail to restore courage and spark anger. The general will ask his vacillating soldiers: 'Are the women of Cochabamba present?"

To celebrate their bravery, Bolivia now marks May 27 as Mother's Day.

In 1900 the population was 21,886.

Besides a number of schools and charitable institutions, the Catholic diocese has 55 parishes, 80 churches and chapels, and 160 priests.

==== Water War ====
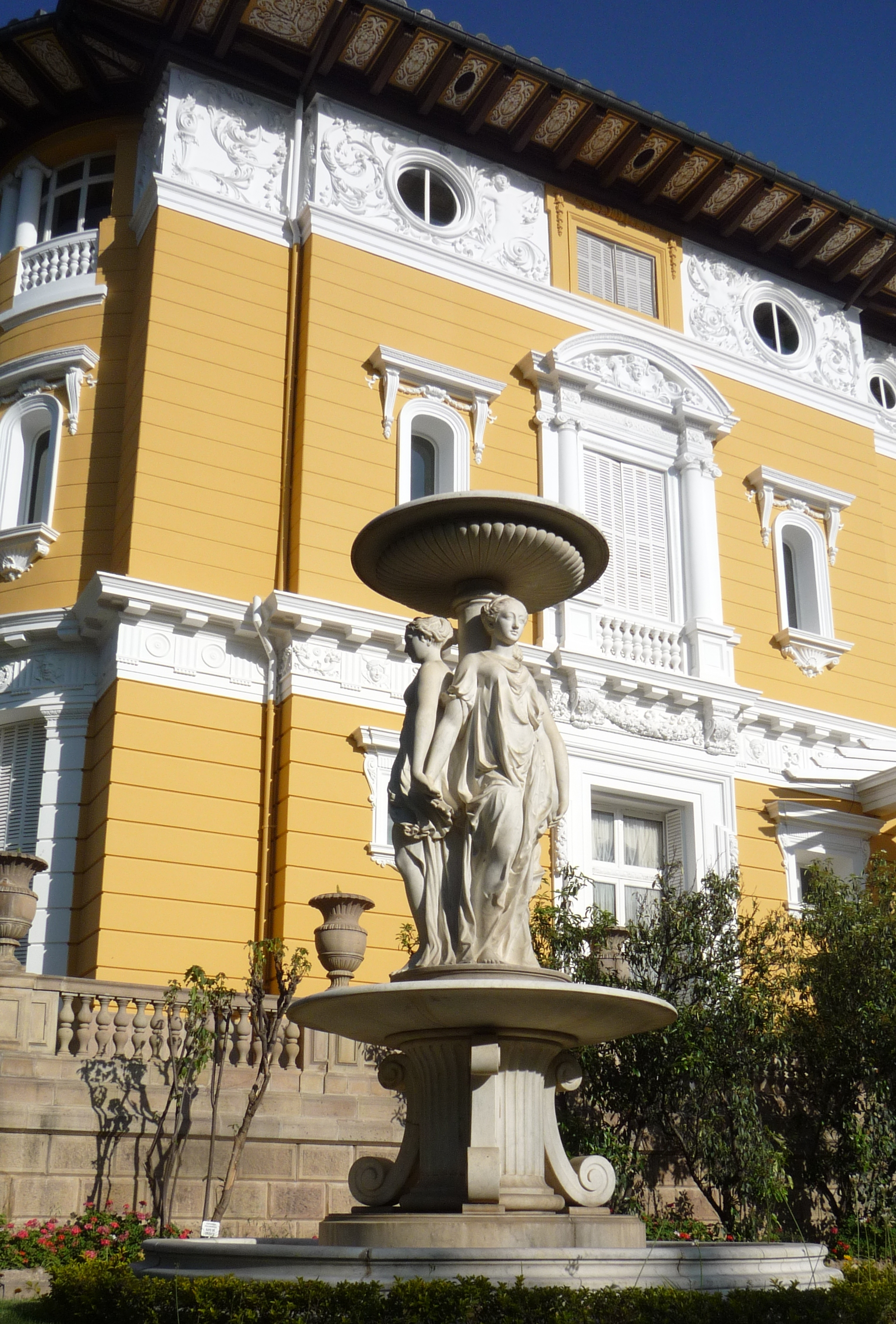
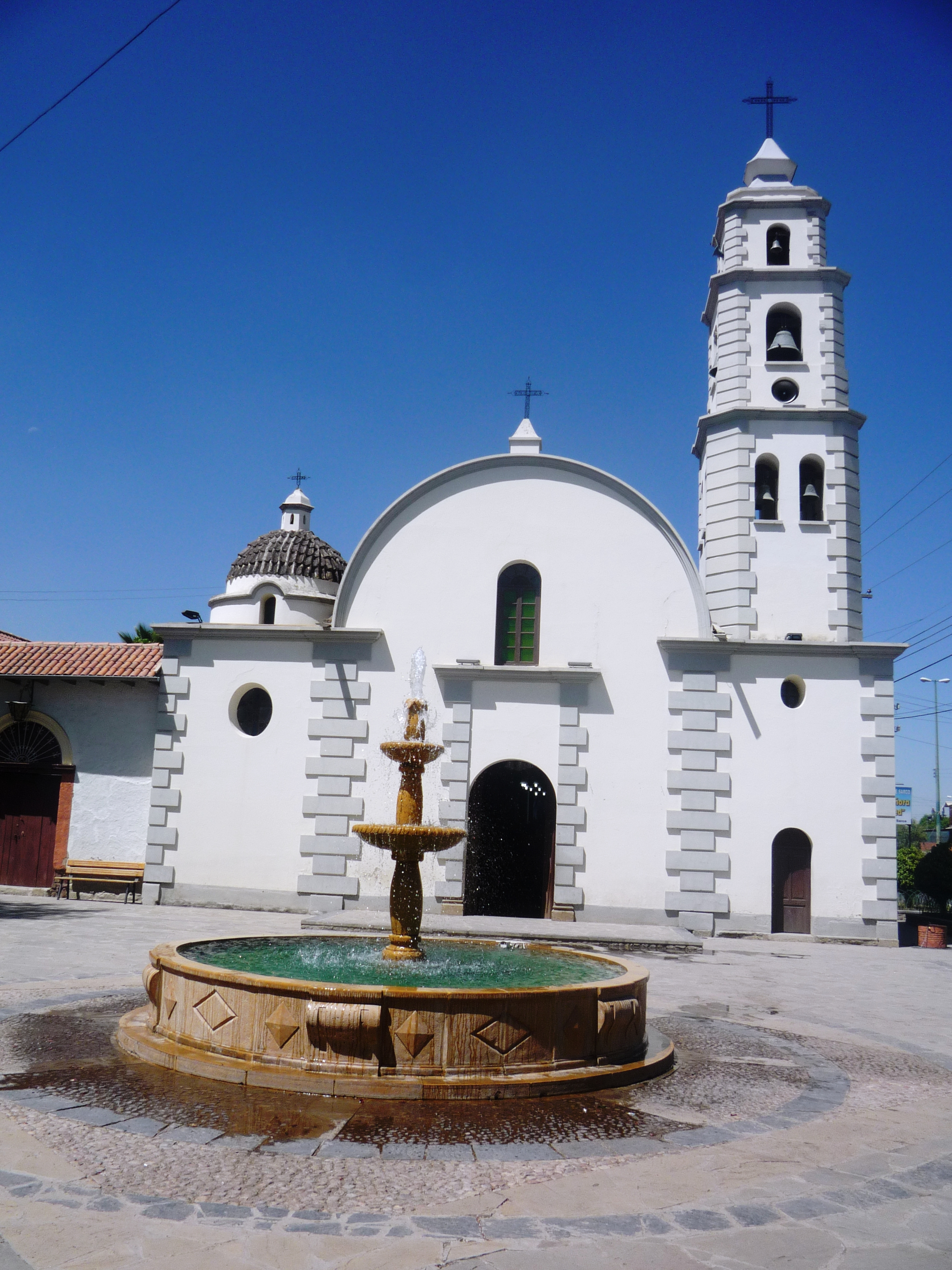
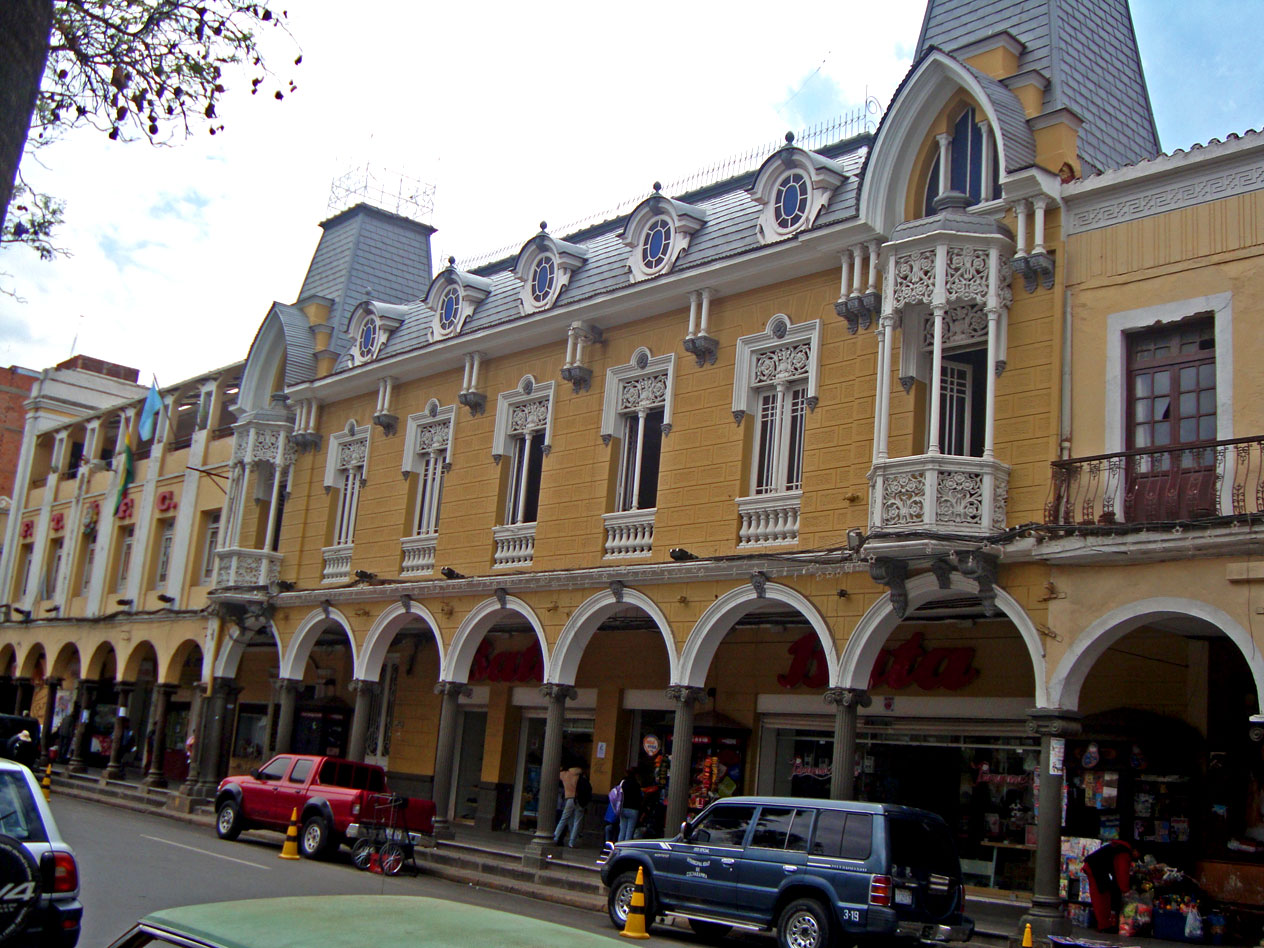
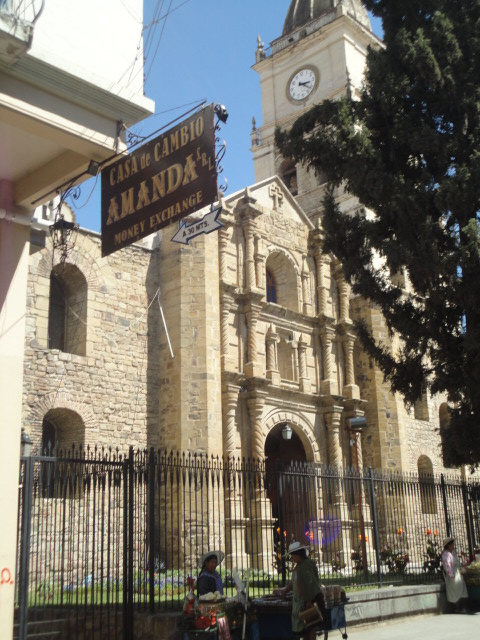
Clockwise, from upper left: The Palacio Portales built for mining magnate Simón Iturri Patiño; The Sarco Templo la Merced; The Exterior view of the Metropolitan Cathedral of Cochabamba and The Casa Grande, Cochabamba, Bolivia.

In 1998 the International Monetary Fund agreed to give Bolivia a loan of $138 million to control inflation and promote economic growth. But it only agreed to do so on the condition that Bolivia sell "all remaining public enterprises," including its national oil refineries and the local water company, SEMAPA. In 1999, a group of private investors, specifically the Bechtel Corporation with headquarters in San Francisco, California, United States of America, came together under the name of Aguas del Tunari and bought the rights for the privatization of the city's water. In that same year, the World Bank (WB) refused to subsidize the water to help lower the cost for the people. Then in 2000, the people of Cochabamba began to protest as water priced hiked to a 50% increase that the majority could not afford.

The Coalition for the Defense of Water and Life, and its leader Oscar Olivera, started a demonstration in La Plaza 14 de Septiembre also known as La Plaza Principal. The march was meant to be peaceful, but after two days the police used tear gas against the protestors and injured about 175 people and killed 1 and blinded two. Soon after, news reports were made about the protests and the violence. The Defense of Water and Life held an unofficial referendum and 96% of 50,000 people wanted Aguas del Tunari's contract to terminate, but the government refused. The protests only grew and the entire world began to watch forcing Bechtel to leave its contract and return SEMAPA to the public. Bechtel as well tried to sue the Bolivian government for $50 million but it withdrew its claim shortly after. This event was soon labelled as the Water Wars and became a driving force for anti-globalization projects such as the UN's decision to make water sanitation a human right and the privatisation of water as unethical in 2010. Additionally, the Water Wars would help spark the next revolt against the privatisation of natural gases from 2003 to 2005 which would lead to the removal of two presidents, Gonzalo Sánchez de Lozada and Carlos Mesa, and the rise of President Evo Morales in 2006.

In January 2007 city dwellers clashed with mostly rural protestors, leaving four dead and over 130 injured. The first democratically elected Prefect of Cochabamba, Manfred Reyes Villa, had allied himself with the leaders of Bolivia's Eastern Departments in a dispute with President Evo Morales over regional autonomy and other political issues. The protestors blockaded the highways, bridges, and main roads, having days earlier set fire to the departmental seat of government, trying to force the resignation of Reyes Villa. Citizens attacked the protestors, breaking the blockade and routing them, while the police did little to stop the violence. Further attempts by the protestors to reinstate the blockade and threaten the government were unsuccessful, but the underlying tensions had not been resolved.

In July 2007 a monument erected by veterans of January's protest movement in honour of those killed and injured by government supporters was destroyed in the middle of the night, reigniting racial conflicts in the city.

In August 2008 a nationwide referendum was held. The prefect of Cochabamba, Manfred Reyes Villa, was not confirmed by the voters, and he was removed from the position.

== Climate and geography ==
Cochabamba is known for its "Eternal Spring". Neither experiencing the humid heat of Santa Cruz nor the frigid winds of La Paz, Cochabamba experiences a semi-arid climate (Köppen: BSk), bordering on a subtropical highland climate (Köppen: Cwb). The characteristic of the climate is an extended dry season that runs from May until October with a wet season that generally begins in November with the principal rains ending in March.

The valley of Cochabamba has been classified as a mesothermal valley. The basin floor has an average elevation of 2600 m but at its lowest point in the east it runs at 2480 m. Surrounding mountains vary in height with the highest elevation in vicinity of valley being Tunari with 5,023 m a.s.l. The city is primarily built on the Cenozoic and more specifically, Quaternary sedimentary fill of the basin-valley. Mountains and hills are composed of old rocks dating to the Paleozoic and, in some parts, to the Cretaceous.

Climate data for Cochabamba (Jorge Wilstermann International Airport), elevation 2,548 m (8,360 ft)
Month	Jan	Feb	Mar	Apr	May	Jun	Jul	Aug	Sep	Oct	Nov	Dec	Year
Record high °C (°F)	35.0 (95.0)	33.5 (92.3)	34.0 (93.2)	33.4 (92.1)	32.6 (90.7)	31.5 (88.7)	30.6 (87.1)	32.7 (90.9)	32.8 (91.0)	34.5 (94.1)	35.5 (95.9)	34.9 (94.8)	35.5 (95.9)
Mean daily maximum °C (°F)	25.0 (77.0)	24.8 (76.6)	25.5 (77.9)	26.3 (79.3)	25.9 (78.6)	24.9 (76.8)	24.8 (76.6)	25.9 (78.6)	26.8 (80.2)	27.8 (82.0)	27.8 (82.0)	26.4 (79.5)	26.0 (78.8)
Daily mean °C (°F)	18.7 (65.7)	18.4 (65.1)	18.4 (65.1)	17.6 (63.7)	15.3 (59.5)	13.4 (56.1)	13.4 (56.1)	15.2 (59.4)	17.2 (63.0)	19.1 (66.4)	19.8 (67.6)	19.4 (66.9)	17.2 (62.9)
Mean daily minimum °C (°F)	12.4 (54.3)	12.1 (53.8)	11.3 (52.3)	8.8 (47.8)	4.7 (40.5)	1.9 (35.4)	2.1 (35.8)	4.5 (40.1)	7.7 (45.9)	10.3 (50.5)	11.8 (53.2)	12.4 (54.3)	8.3 (47.0)
Record low °C (°F)	4.8 (40.6)	5.1 (41.2)	2.0 (35.6)	−1.2 (29.8)	−4.5 (23.9)	−7.0 (19.4)	−5.2 (22.6)	−5.6 (21.9)	−3.2 (26.2)	0.1 (32.2)	4.0 (39.2)	5.0 (41.0)	−7.0 (19.4)
Average precipitation mm (inches)	117.5 (4.63)	95.8 (3.77)	66.9 (2.63)	17.7 (0.70)	3.3 (0.13)	2.0 (0.08)	1.8 (0.07)	5.0 (0.20)	8.0 (0.31)	18.2 (0.72)	45.8 (1.80)	87.5 (3.44)	469.5 (18.48)
Average precipitation days	16.6	14.5	11.1	4.0	1.1	0.7	0.7	1.4	3.1	5.2	8.6	14.0	81
Average relative humidity (%)	64.2	65.0	62.9	57.9	52.2	51.6	49.9	47.7	47.8	47.8	50.4	56.9	54.5
Source: Servicio Nacional de Meteorología e Hidrología de Bolivia

== Demography ==
Historical population of Cochabamba
Year	Pop.	±% p.a.
1793	22,305	—
1835	14,162	−1.08%
1854	35,800	+5.00%
1900	21,886	−1.06%
1950	74,949	+2.49%
1967	137,004	+3.61%
1992	414,307	+4.53%
2001	516,683	+2.48%
2012	630,587	+1.83%
Source: 1793, 1967; 1835; 1854, 1950; 1900; 1992; 2001; 2012

According to the 2024 Bolivian census, the population of the municipality of Cochabamba is 665,505 inhabitants. This makes it the fourth most populous municipality in the country, behind Santa Cruz de la Sierra, El Alto, and La Paz.

The population of the municipality increased by more than half between 1992 and 2024:

Year	Population (municipality)
1992	425,081
2001	517,024
2012	632,013
2024	665,505

At the beginning of the republican era, Cochabamba ranked as the second most populated city in Bolivia according to the 1846 census, with a total of 30,396 inhabitants, behind La Paz, which had more than 60,000 inhabitants at that time.

The city extends beyond the political-administrative boundaries of the municipality of Cochabamba, forming a conurbation with the municipalities of Colcapirhua, Quillacollo, Sacaba, Sipe Sipe, Tiquipaya, and Vinto. Together they make up the Kanata Metropolitan Region, which is the third-largest metropolitan area in Bolivia and an important tourist, economic, industrial, and population center.

Like other Bolivian urban centers, Cochabamba is no exception to the national trend of urban growth at the expense of the rural population. This process of accelerated urbanization is not due exclusively to industrialization, but also to complex political and social factors such as poverty, the decline of the agricultural sector, and the availability of job opportunities in cities.

== Culture ==
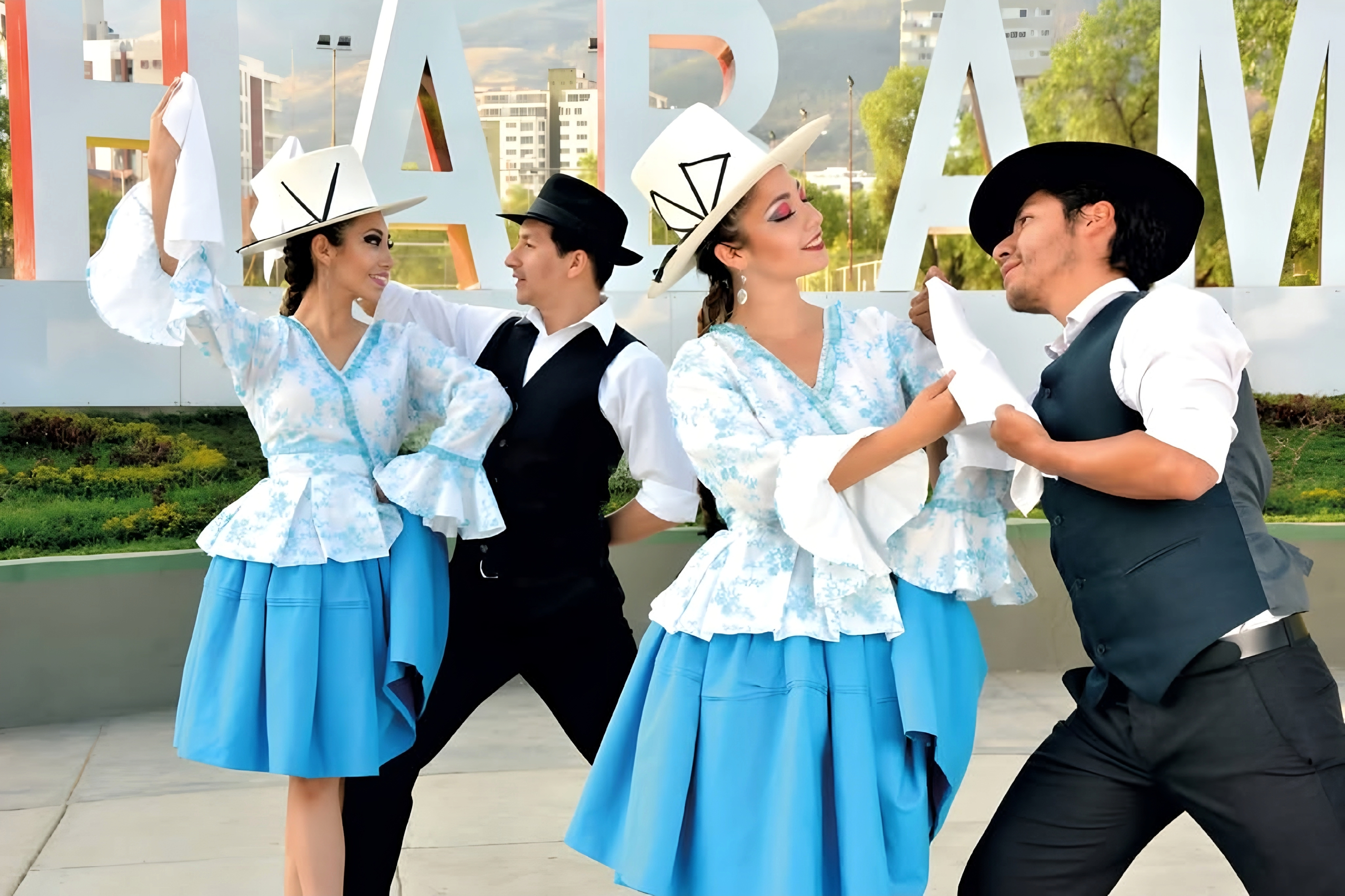
Traditional clothing of Cochabamba

In Cochabamba, one of the most important religious festivities in Bolivia is held: that of the Virgin of Urkupiña, also known as the Patroness of National Integration. This celebration brings together Catholics from all over the country as well as foreign pilgrims, who participate either as spectators or as dancers in the folkloric procession of the same name, immersing themselves in the dual nature of a religious and traditional celebration. Another important festivity is the Alasitas Fair and the Corso de Corsos.

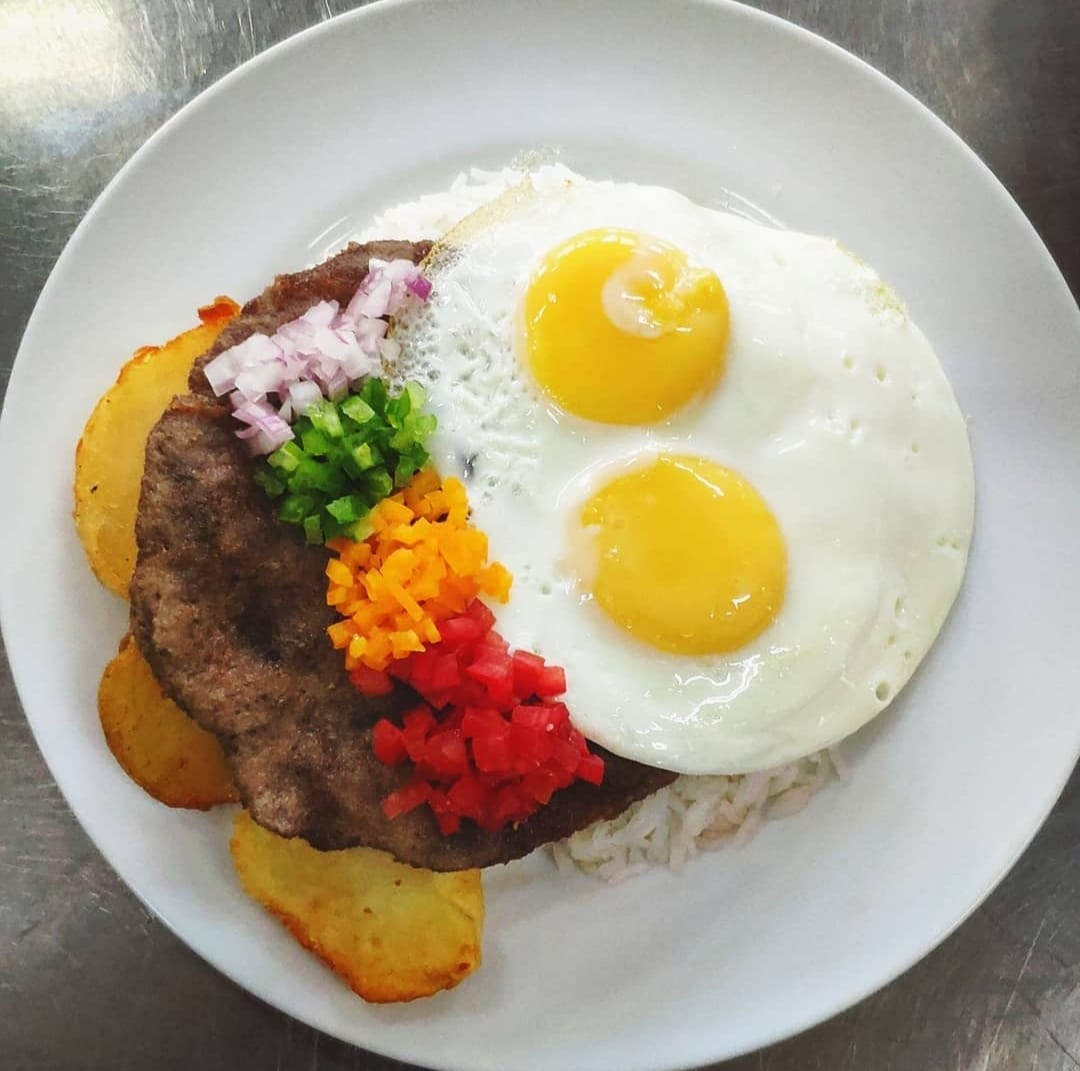
Sillp’ancho cochabambino

The cuisine of Cochabamba is characterized by its great variety of culinary dishes. Since 2017, Cochabamba has been part of UNESCO's Creative Cities Network in the category of gastronomy.

- Chicharrón: a dish made with pork cooked for approximately 5 to 6 hours, served with cooked corn hominy (mote) and potatoes.
- P’ampaku: a dish prepared with chicken, pork, duck, potato, sweet potato, and plantain. All these ingredients are placed in a hermetically sealed container and buried in a pit, which is covered with stones and bricks previously heated by a wood or charcoal fire until the stones crack. It is covered with fresh grass or banana leaves and then completely sealed with mud. The food is considered cooked when the pit cracks and smoke rises from the burned fresh grass. It is served with a fresh vegetable salad.
- Pichón de Cliza: a dish made with pigeon meat (squab), boiled and then grilled. It is served with rice and boiled potatoes.
- Sillp’ancho: a dry dish with breaded beef, pan-fried, accompanied by a fried egg and a raw salad of onion, carrot, tomato, and locoto. It is served with rice and boiled potatoes, which are later sliced and fried.
- Lapping: a dish with fried marinaded flank steak.
- Jak’a Lawa: a dish made from ground choclo (fresh corn on the cob), accompanied by pieces of meat and pork rind. It is served in a deep plate.
- Ch’aqchu: a dish made with chuño, meat boiled in water with potatoes and fava beans, hard-boiled eggs, fresh cheese sliced into rounds, and a salad of tomato and raw onion, all topped with a spicy red chili sauce.
- Jawas Piqtu: a dish made with fava beans mixed with egg and tomato. It is served with potatoes.
- Pique Macho: originally a dish made of beef loin fried in its own juices, with French fries, and a salad of tomato, onion, locoto, and sliced hard-boiled egg. The French fries are placed on the plate first, then the meat and chorizo are mixed and placed on top, and finally the salad and egg. A typical accompaniment is a mixture of oil, vinegar, salt, llajua, and finally beer, all mixed in a glass and then poured over the dish.
- Chank’a de conejo: rabbit meat cut into pieces and boiled together with a white soup containing green onion (scallion), white potato, vegetables, and seasoned with traditional llajwa.
- Uchuku Aiquileño: a dish consisting of red chili pepper, potatoes, rice, chuño, and meats (beef tongue, duck, and chicken). It is served with a chicken soup with chili (thickened with trimmings or ground bread), accompanied by rice cake, ch’uñu phuti, potato cake, fried ceibo flowers (chilliqchi), white potatoes, chicken meat, beef tongue, and golden-browned duck.
- Llajua: a spicy sauce made from locoto, tomato, and quilquiña (an aromatic herb). The vast majority of traditional Bolivian dishes are accompanied by this sauce.

The international street art festival known as the BAU (Bienal de Arte Urbano) has been hosted in Cochabamba every two years since 2011. The festival is organized by proyecto mARTadero, a local cultural centre. In 2011, 2013, 2015, and 2017 the painting was done in the Villa Coronilla, and Geronimo de Osorio neighbourhoods. In 2019 the festival focused on the neighbourhood Esperanza, on the edge of the Alalay Lake. The festival has featured internationally renowned artists such as Blu (Italy) and Inti (Chile).

Commensurate with other large cities in the Andean highlands of South America, Cochabamba is a city of contrasts. Its central commercial districts, Zona Norte, is bounded by Plaza Colón and Plaza 14 de Septiembre, are generally equipped with modern urban amenities and are where the majority of the city's formal business and commercial industries are based. La Cancha, the largest open-air market in South America, is also an active place where locals can buy a range of items. An active nightlife is centered around Calle España and along the broad, tree-lined boulevard, El Prado. In contrast, the Zona Sur, a remote area adjacent to the Wilstermann International Airport is visibly impoverished, with adobe homes and unpaved roads, which is often the first impression visitors acquire while commuting into the city.

In 2009, the government under President Evo Morales created a new constitution that declared Spanish and 36 other indigenous languages as the official languages of the country. However, the most widely spoken languages in Cochabamba are Spanish and Quechua. Although the Spanish that is spoken in the Cochabamba region is generally regarded as rather conservative in its phonetics and vocabulary, the use of Quechua terminology (wawa [child] and wistupiku [mouth or twist lips]) has been widely incorporated into its standardized form.

About four-fifths of the population of Bolivia identifies as Catholic.

Like other cities that share the same ethnic group quadrants like Salta or Cuenca, Cochabamba's demographics consist of the following visible groups in order of prevalence: Indigenous (mostly of Quechua and Aymara ethnicity) people, Mestizo, or mixed Indigenous and Spanish European, and people of Spanish (Criollos) and other European descent. As well as a fairly significant population of Afro-Bolivians.

By 2013, the human development index of the Metropolitan region of Cochabamba was 0.801 as a result of a 35% growth in the last 20 years.

== Government ==
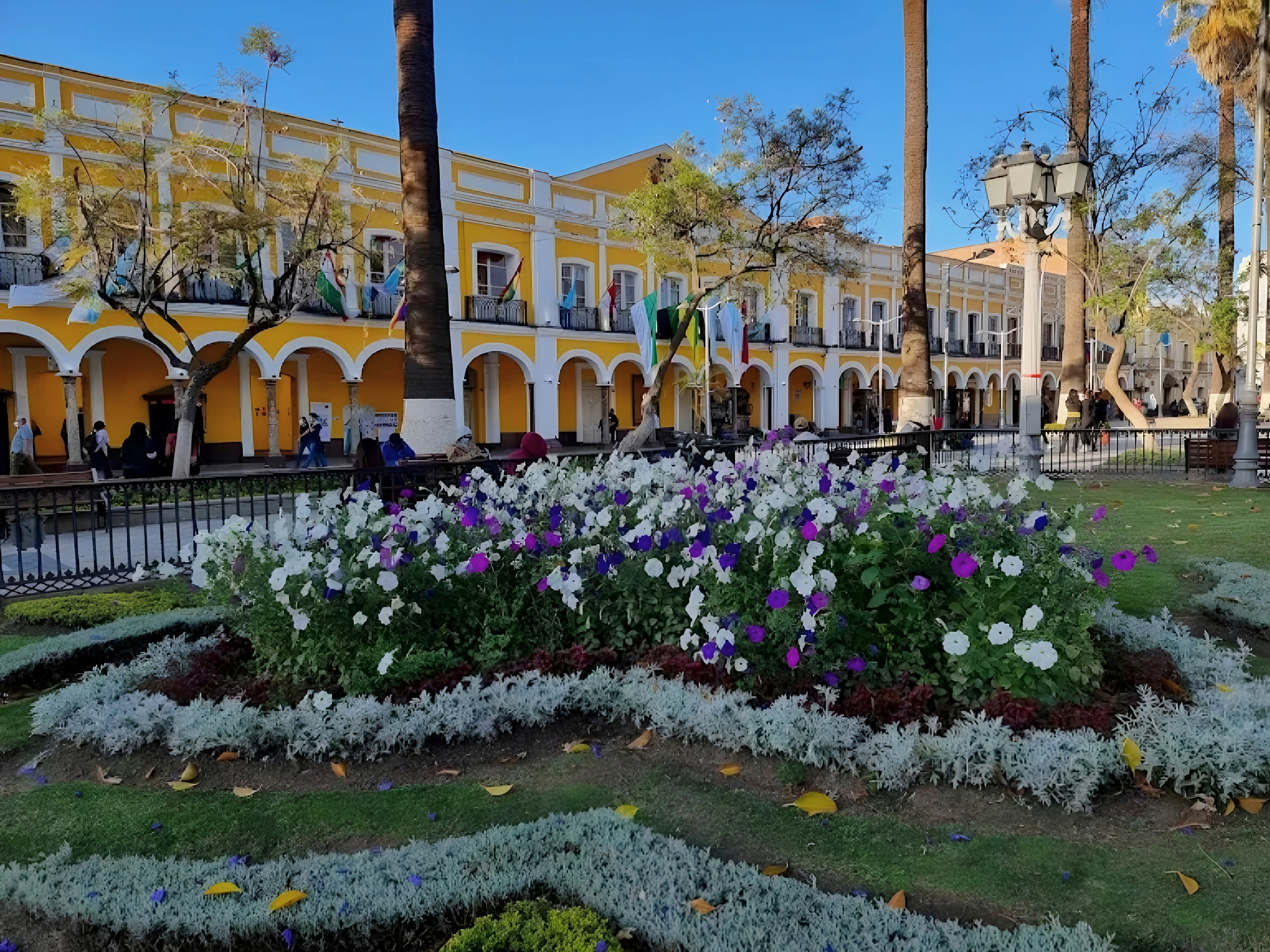
Departmental Government of Cochabamba

=== Capital status ===
Cochabamba is the capital of the department of Cochabamba and the seat of the Autonomous Departmental Government of Cochabamba, the political and administrative authority of the department. Following the enactment of the Popular Participation Law No. 1551 in 1994, together with the Administrative Decentralization Law No. 1654, a process of reconfiguration between the State and civil society was initiated, transferring powers and resources to subnational levels, such as municipal governments. As a result, Bolivia's departments enjoy autonomy statutes that define their internal structure. At the parliamentary level, the executive branch is headed by a governor, while the legislative branch is exercised by a departmental legislative assembly. In addition to the governor's office and several directorates, the Autonomous Departmental Government of Cochabamba is made up of eight departmental secretariats. The status of being the capital constitutes a distinguishing factor in relation to the other cities of the department, due to the higher concentration of public officials and a larger floating population that comes to Cochabamba to carry out procedures with the different secretariats and directorates.

Cochabamba is also the capital of the Cercado Province, located in the center of the department, since its founding on August 15, 1571 by the Spanish captain Gerónimo de Osorio under the original name Villa Real de Oropesa. This means that the various provincial delegations of the departments of the Autonomous Departmental Government and institutions of the Government of Bolivia are located in the city.

=== Municipal government ===
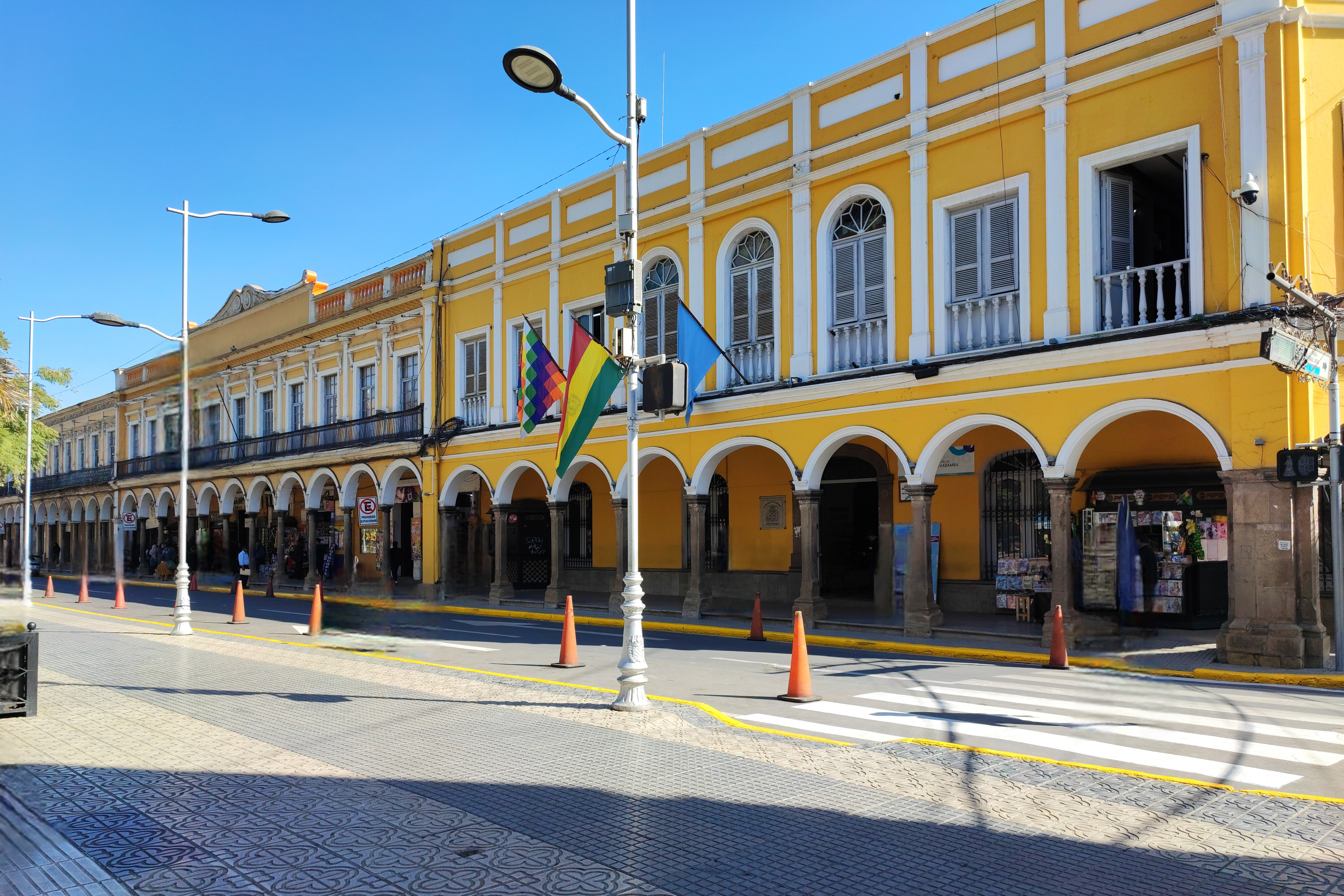
Cochabamba City Hall

The administration of the city is carried out through democratic governance, whose authorities are elected every four years by universal suffrage. The electoral roll is made up of all registered residents of Cochabamba who are over 18 years of age and Bolivian nationals. The Mayor of Cochabamba is the head of government and of the municipal administration, legally representing the municipality in judicial and extrajudicial matters. The mayor also presides over the executive branch of the city.

According to Article 283 of the Political Constitution of the State and Law No. 482 on Autonomous Municipal Governments, municipal government consists of the Municipal Council, which exercises legislative, deliberative, and oversight powers, in cooperation with the executive branch. The Cochabamba Municipal Council is composed of eleven councilors elected by direct vote in municipal elections and represents the highest legislative authority of the municipal government. Decisions and resolutions are adopted by a majority vote or by a two-thirds majority, depending on the general regulations.

Since May 3, 2021, the Mayor of Cochabamba has been former presidential candidate and businessman Manfred Reyes Villa (APB Súmate).

== Economy ==
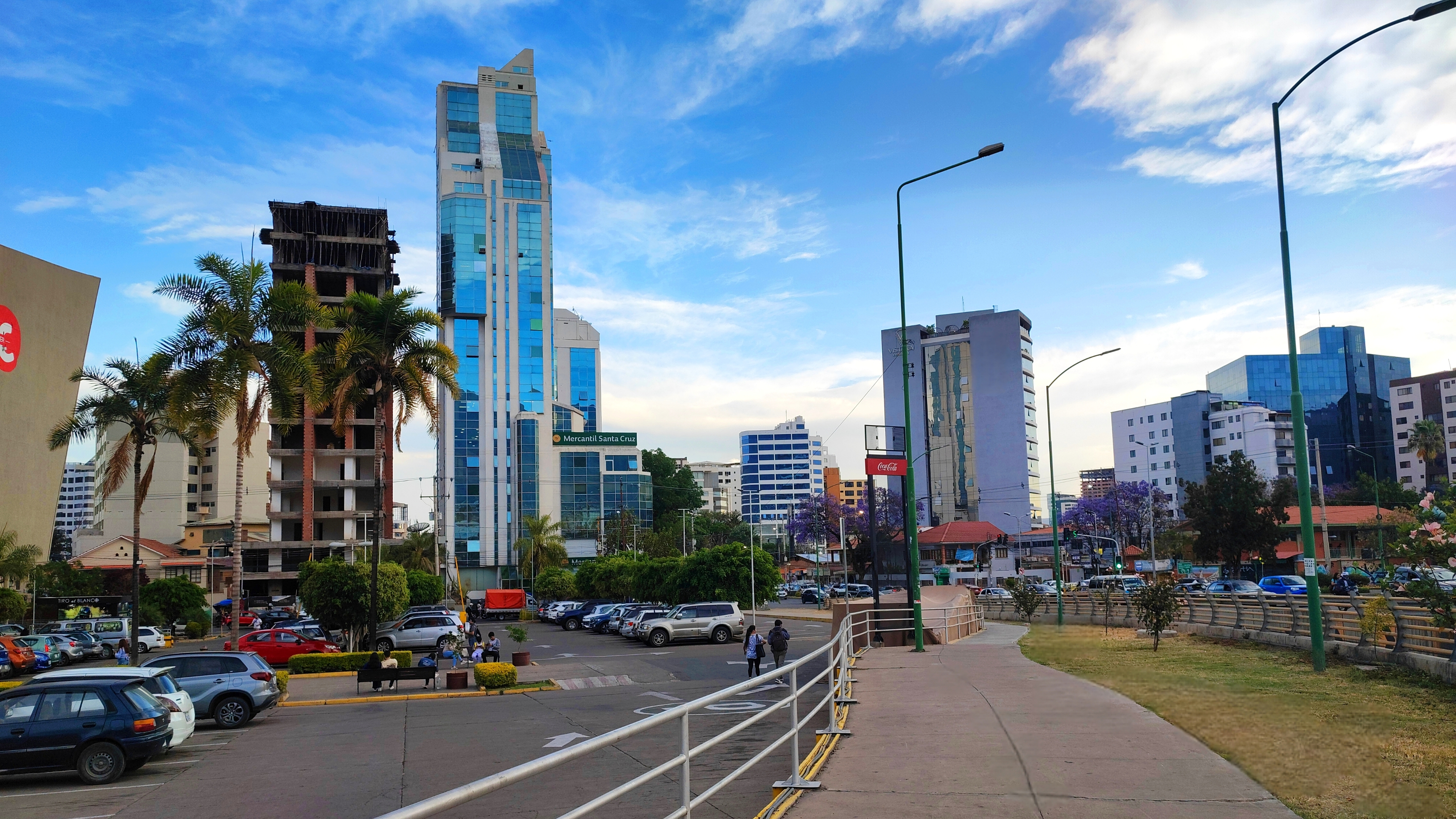
Muyurina Skyline

Cochabamba ranks third in economic importance nationwide. Historically, Cochabamba's economy was supported by agriculture. Currently, it has diversified and relies more on oil production and manufacturing. The municipality's economy is primarily centered on the tertiary sector, with activities such as commerce, transportation, storage, and other services, followed by the manufacturing industry. In 2021, the municipal Gross Domestic Product (GDP) was estimated to reach approximately 17,535 million bolivianos (equivalent to US$6,710 million in purchasing power parity terms), with a GDP per capita of 20,844 bolivianos (US$7,977 PPP). According to these figures, the municipality's economy contributes 43.6% of the department's value added and 6% of the national economy. During the heyday of the mining industry in Bolivia, Cochabamba enjoyed sustained development, only to enter a period of decline during the 18th century, as the silver mining industry began to decline. However, during the second half of the 19th century it was established as an agricultural center in the country.

=== Commerce ===
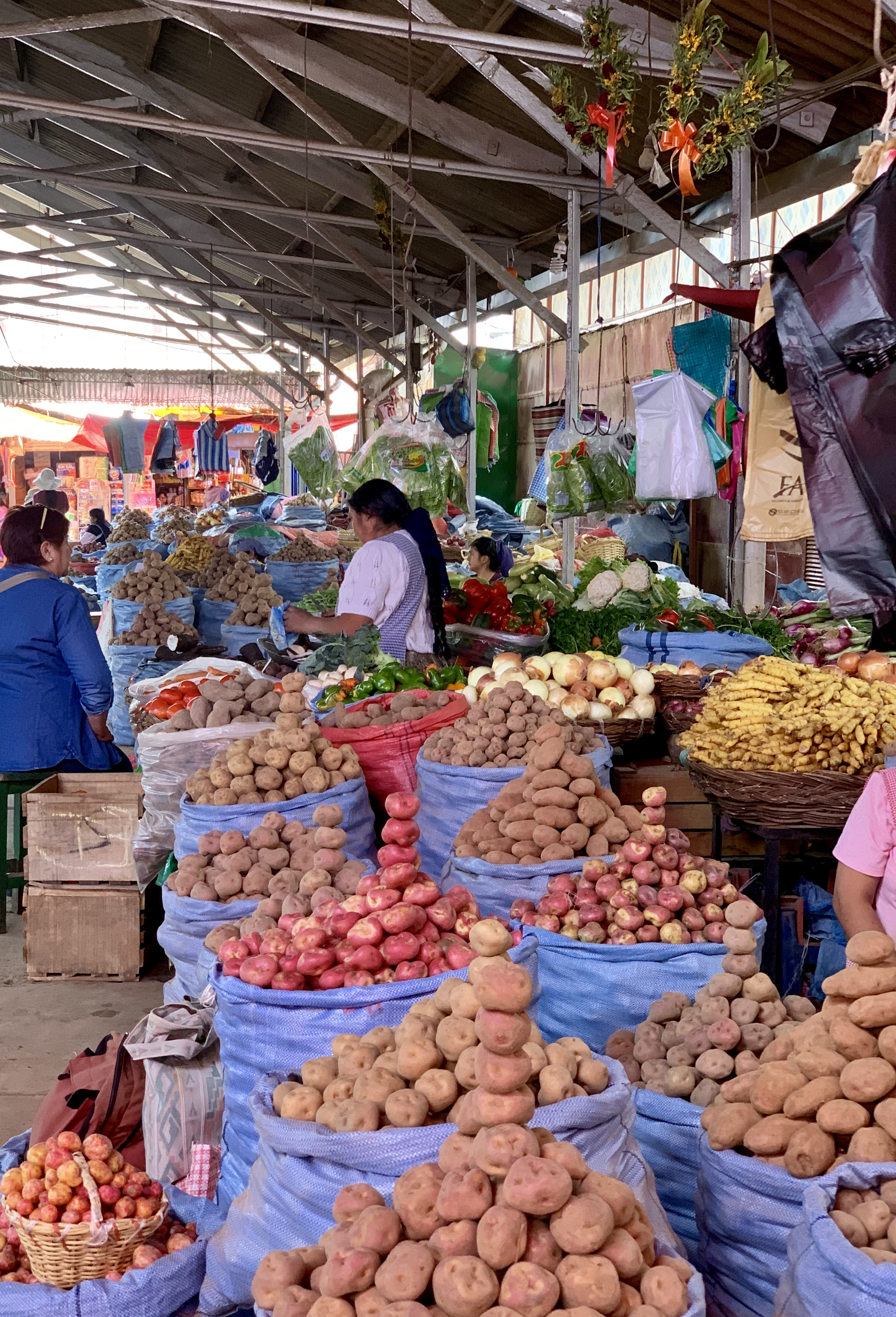
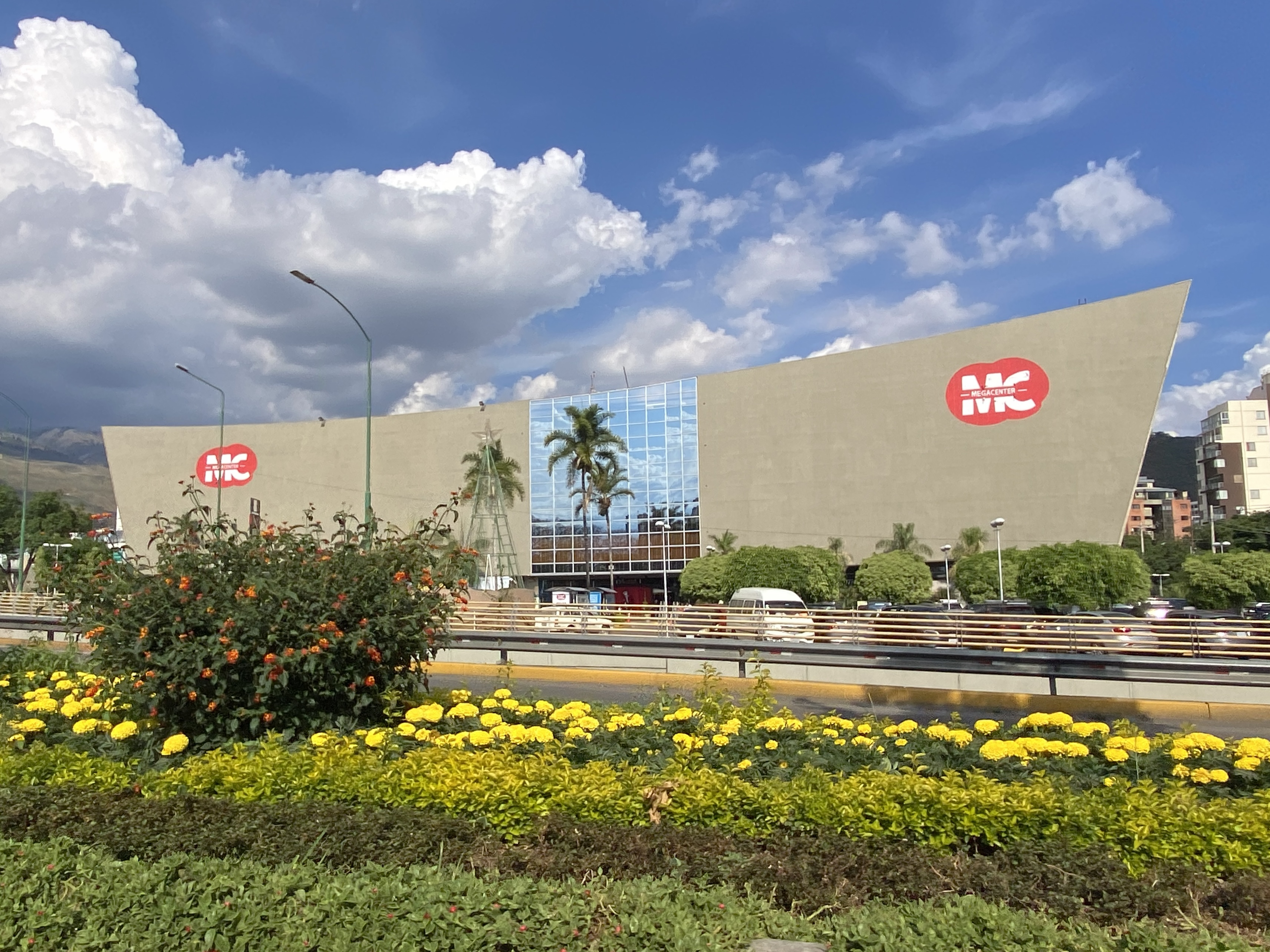
Merchants at the La Cancha market and the Megacenter shopping center.

The city's central area is where most of its businesses and commercial activity is concentrated. A large amount of formal and informal commerce is present on the streets of Cochabamba, encompassing the popular commercial area known as La Cancha, made up of several private and public markets. However, its growth has begun to displace the commercial center to the northwest of the city, traditionally considered a residential area. It has a vibrant cosmopolitan nightlife, especially around Calle España and along the boulevard or avenue El Prado.

The city is home to many of the country's largest and most important companies, such as Boliviana de Aviación, ELFEC, Comteco, MotorParts, IC Norte, and large establishments such as Hipermaxi, Paseo Aranjuez, Hupermall, Supermall, and Mall Brisas del Sur, among others.

Cochabamba is the third-largest economy in Bolivia and is the most stable due to the dynamism of its market and domestic consumption, as well as its excellent transportation system, which allows it to transport goods to all of the department's provinces.

At the end of April and beginning of May of each year, the Alalay Fairgrounds opens its doors for eleven days exclusively to hold trade fair events of all kinds, with FEICOBOL (Cochabamba International Fair) being one of the largest commercial events in Bolivia and its activities brought together companies worldwide, which helped the economy of the department and the growth of tourism. It was currently replaced by the Cochabamba International Exhibition Fair or FEXCO in an agreement between the Autonomous Municipal Government of Cochabamba and the Chamber of Commerce, Industry and Services of Cochabamba (ICAM), which began its activities with its first version, held in 2023.

=== Agriculture ===
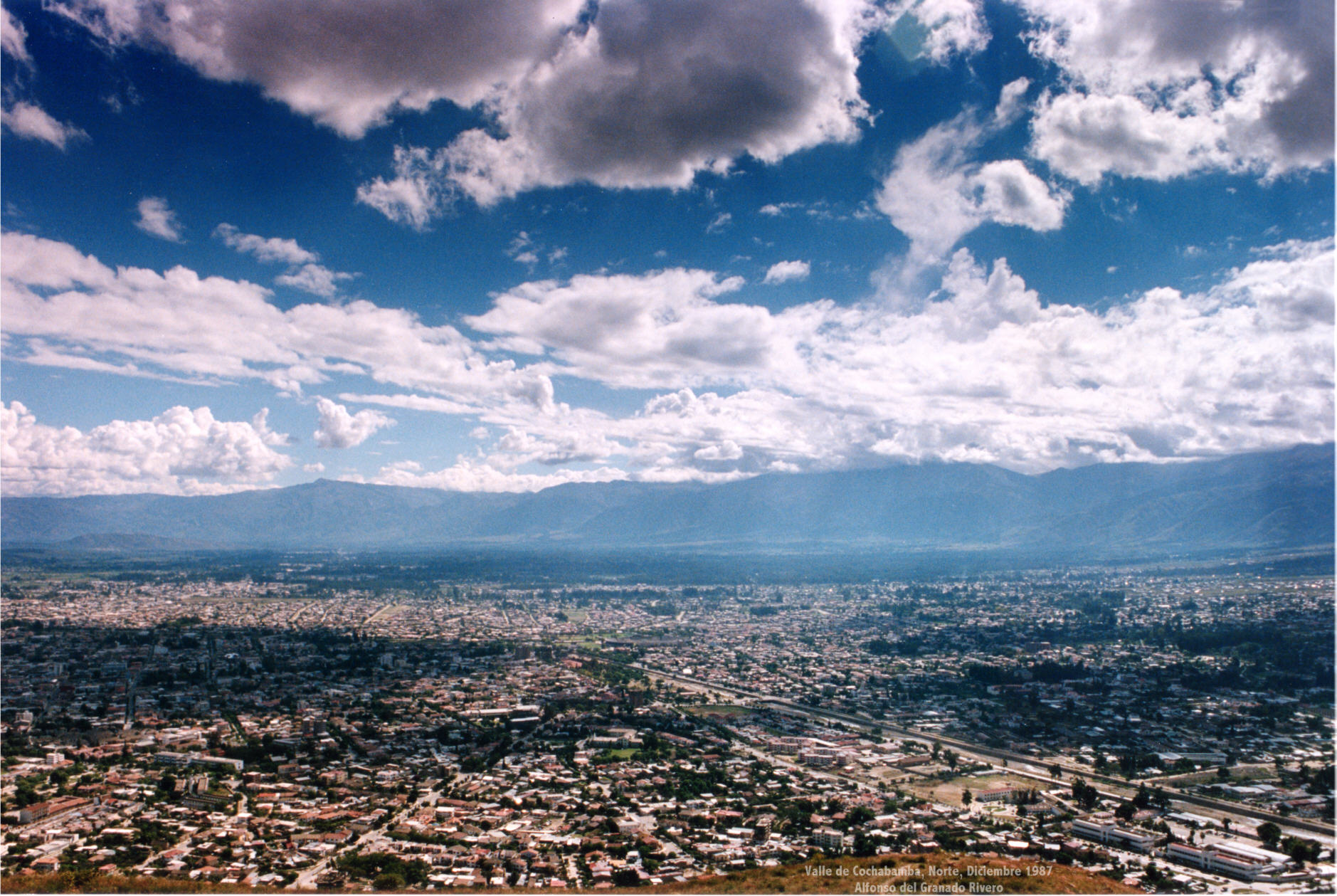
The Cochabamba Valley around 1987

Agriculture in the city of Cochabamba was very important, but it has declined due to the expansion of the urban area, which has reduced the arable land south of the city, to the Maica and Tamborada areas. However, in the city's markets, you can buy products that vary depending on the area from which they are brought, from regions with a distant climate and geography:

- The Tropics: in this area, the crops of banana, orange, mandarin, palm heart, papaya, pineapple, cocoa, etc. are mainly found.
- The valleys, this is the main agricultural area, in this area there are crops of broad bean, pea, onion, corn, tomato, locoto, parsley, lettuce, turnip, carrot, custard apple, strawberry, peach, etc.
- Subyungas, in this area there are mainly crops of broad bean, peas, custard apple and potato.

=== Services ===
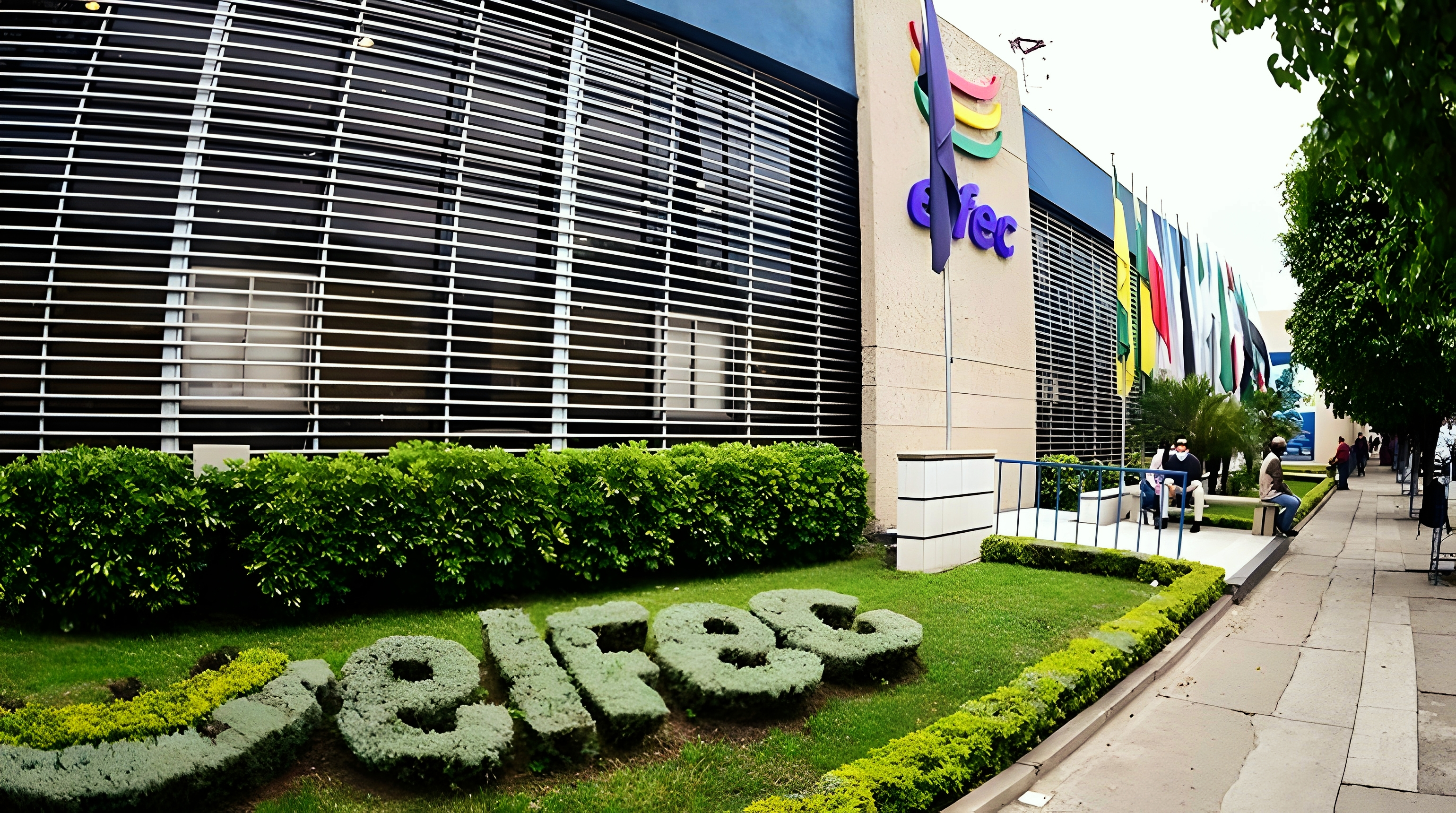
ELFEC Headquarters

Its metropolitan area is characterized by relatively high-quality services. The water and sewerage system currently covers the entire city. Most of the city has access to water, electricity, sewerage, residential gas, and cleaning services, among others. The electricity, water, sanitation, and gas providers are ELFEC, SEMAPA, EMSA, and the regional management of YPFB. The landline telephone operators are Entel, AXS, and Comteco.

== Transport ==
The metropolitan area of Cochabamba (Vinto, Tiquipaya, Quillacollo, Colcapirhua, Cochabamba and Sacaba) has an extensive transportation system, which cover all the districts.

There are almost 70 bus and minibus lines, from A to Z, and dozens of minibuses and fixed-route trufis (T.RU.FI, or "taxi con ruta fija") taxi lines. Most lines have GPS system for monitoring and regulation of hour (line 1, line 16, line L, Line 3V, line 20, line 30, etc.). The T.RU.FI service has at least 60 lines; they are identified by signs on the roof of the vehicle showing the route from the initial stop until the final stop, which is also indicated by the line number to which it belongs.

=== Light rail ===
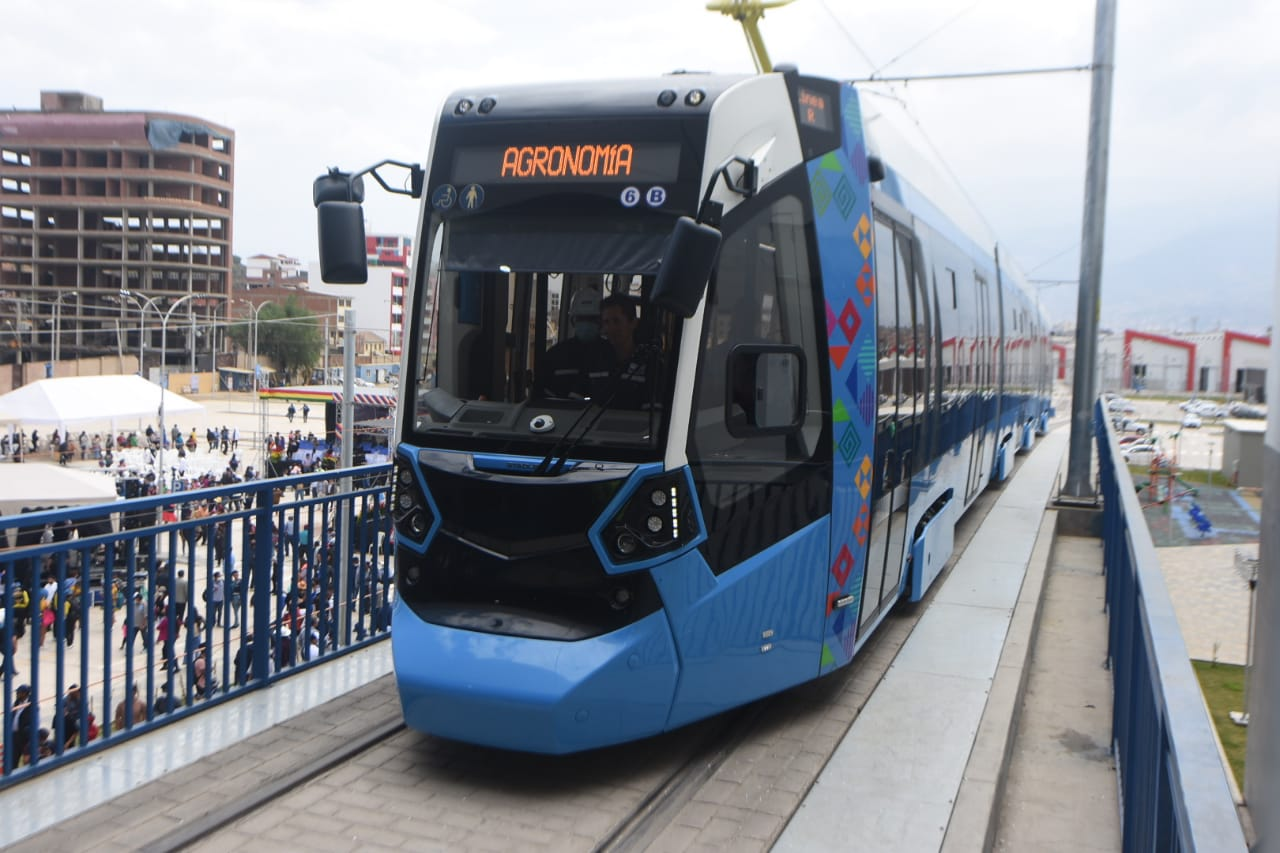
Mi Tren light rail

Construction on an interurban light rail network known as Mi Tren linking Cochabamba with Suticollo, El Castillo and San Simon University began in 2017. Opening of the Red Line and first phase of the Green Line took place September 13, 2022.

=== Airport ===
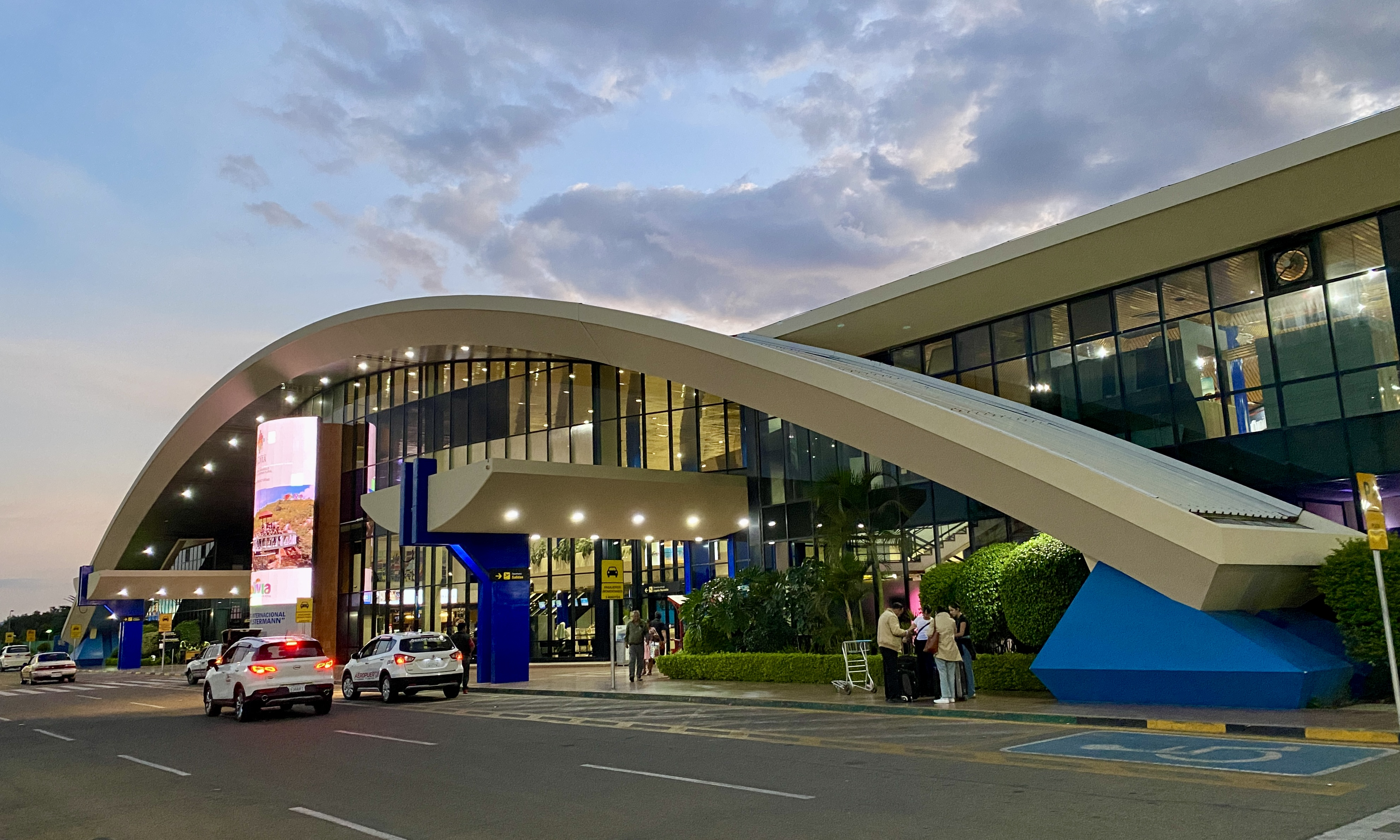
Jorge Wilstermann Airport

Cochabamba is served by the modern Jorge Wilstermann International Airport (IATA code CBB), which handles domestic and international flights. It houses the headquarters of Boliviana de Aviación (BOA) Bolivia's national airline and, in the past, of Lloyd Aéreo Boliviano, Bolivia's former national airline. Other domestic airlines that serve the airport include Línea Aérea Amaszonas, Ecojet and Transporte Aéreo Militar.

== Municipal waste ==
EMSA, the municipal sanitation company, is responsible for the pickup, transportation, storage and removed from urban waste produced. EMSA covers 88% of the city and collects 400 tonnes of waste produced per day. Through the municipal government of Cochabamba, special containers made available throughout the city for the storage of solid waste common. The municipality's sole disposal facility, the K'ara K'ara waste dump (Botadero K'ara K'ara), has been the centre of a long-running controversy over pollution of the air and groundwater; it is frequently blockaded by neighbouring residents demanding changes.

== Media ==
=== Print media ===
There are several newspapers in Cochabamba:

- Los Tiempos
- Opinión
- La Voz
- Gente

=== Radio stations ===
The main radio stations scattered across the department and the capital are:

- Estrella FM 93,1
- Centro Ltda.
- Mega DJ
- Milenio
- La Voz del Juno
- Kancha Parlaspa
- Bandera Tricolor
- Cochabamba
- Gaviota Dorada
- Del Valle
- San Rafael
- La Voz del Valle – Punata
- Continental
- Oro
- Triunfo Morena
- Epoca
- La Verdad F.M.100.7
- M&D Comunicaciones
- Universal
- Fantástico 97.1
- Panorama FM 90.9
- Punata radio Panorama FM 88.9
- FM-100 Clásica
- FM Stereo 98.7 – La voz de América
- Bethel FFM 95.5
- Ritmo 97.5
- La Triple Nueve 99.9
- La Fabrica de la Musica 107.1
- Magnal de Capinota
- Radios Fides Cochabamba, Punata y Chapare
- CEPRA Pongo Khasa 1,390 AM
- Sonido Lider 95.9 FM
- Pio XII FM 97.9
- Mundial
- Porvenir
- Radio Cosmos de Bolivia
- CEPRA – Centro de Producción Radiofónica
- CEPRA – Radio Morochota
- Enlace
- Radio HIT 105.7
- Radio Disney Bolivia

=== Television channels ===
In the capital and throughout the department there are many television channels that broadcast on local, provincial, national or international all day or part of it. The transmission towers that transmit channels nationally and internationally are in the high Cala Cala, Villa Moscu or Villa Taquiña.

- Canal 2: Canal 2 Cochabamba Corazón de América (local)
- Canal 4: Red ATB (national)
- Canal 5: Red Bolivisión (national)
- Canal 7: Bolivia TV (Channel of the State)
- Canal 9: Red Uno de Bolivia (national)
- Canal 11::TVU (local)
- Canal 13: Red Unitel (national)
- Canal 15: Cristo Viene la Red (Religious Channel)
- Canal 17: sko TV (local)
- Canal 18: Radio Televisión Popular (RTP) (national)
- Canal 20: Piñami de Comunicaciones (provincial)
- Canal 21: Tele C (local)
- Canal 24: Red ADVenir Internacional (Christian Channel/International)
- Canal 26: Metro TV (local)
- Canal 27: Sistema Cristiano de Comunicaciones (local)
- Canal 30: 30 TV (local)
- Canal 36: Cadena A (national)
- Canal 39: Univalle TV (local)
- Canal 42: Red PAT (national)
- Canal 45: Abya Yala Television (national)
- Canal 48: Red Unitepc (local)
- Canal 51: MTV Cochabamba(local)
- Canal 57: RTL Canal de Noticias(local)
- Canal 47: TV Culturas (Channel of the State)

== Education ==
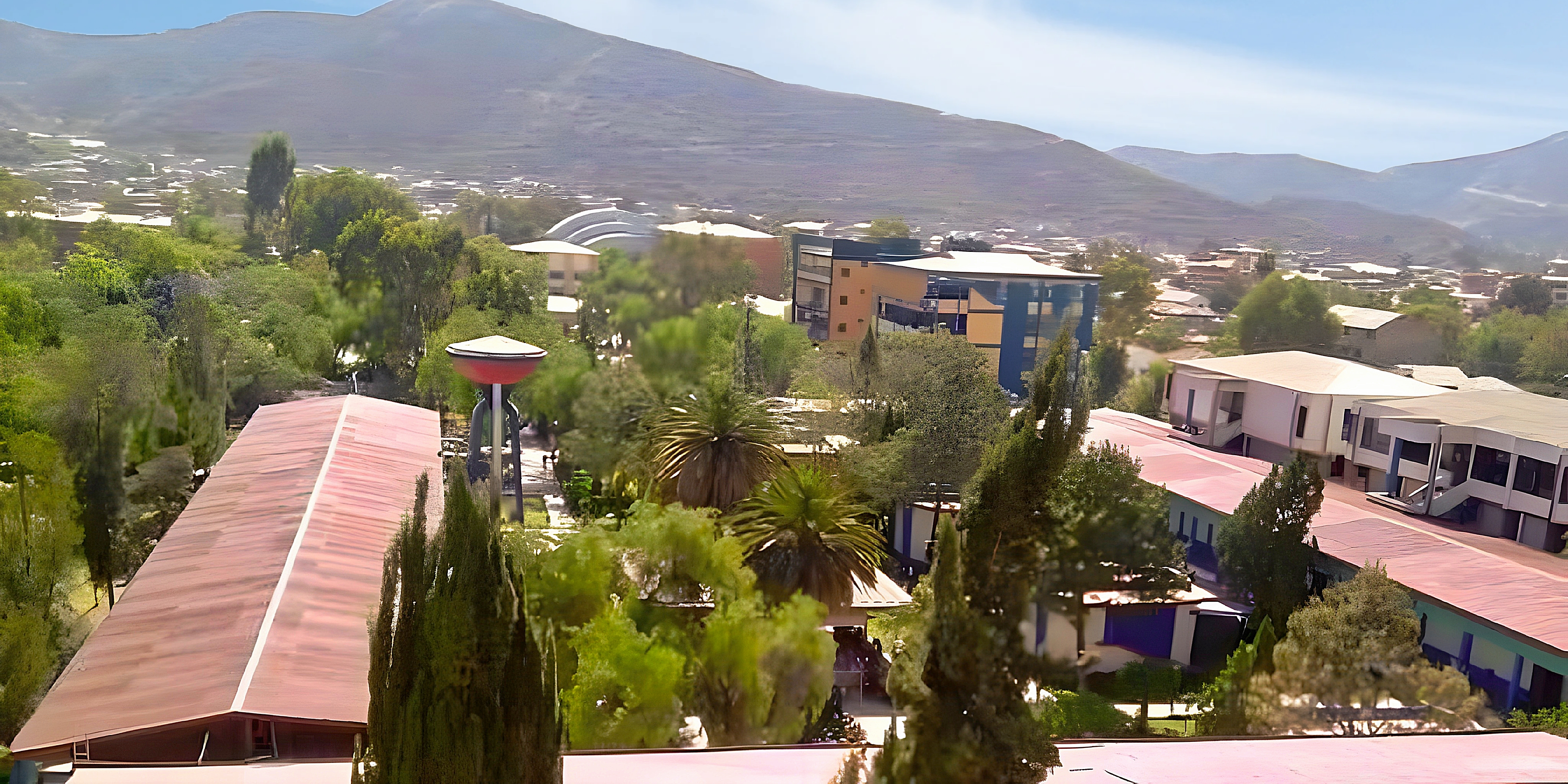
San Simón University

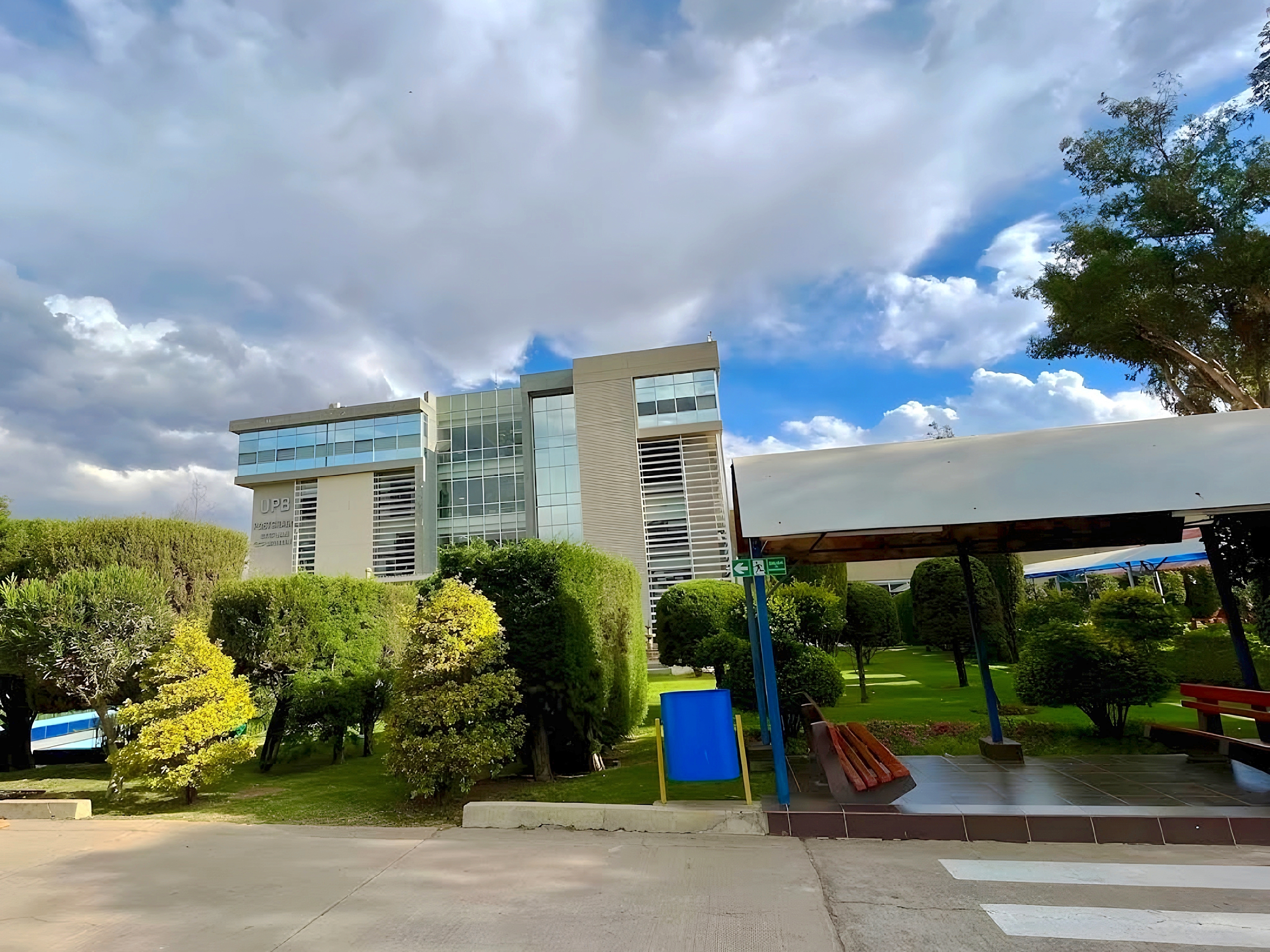
Bolivian Private University

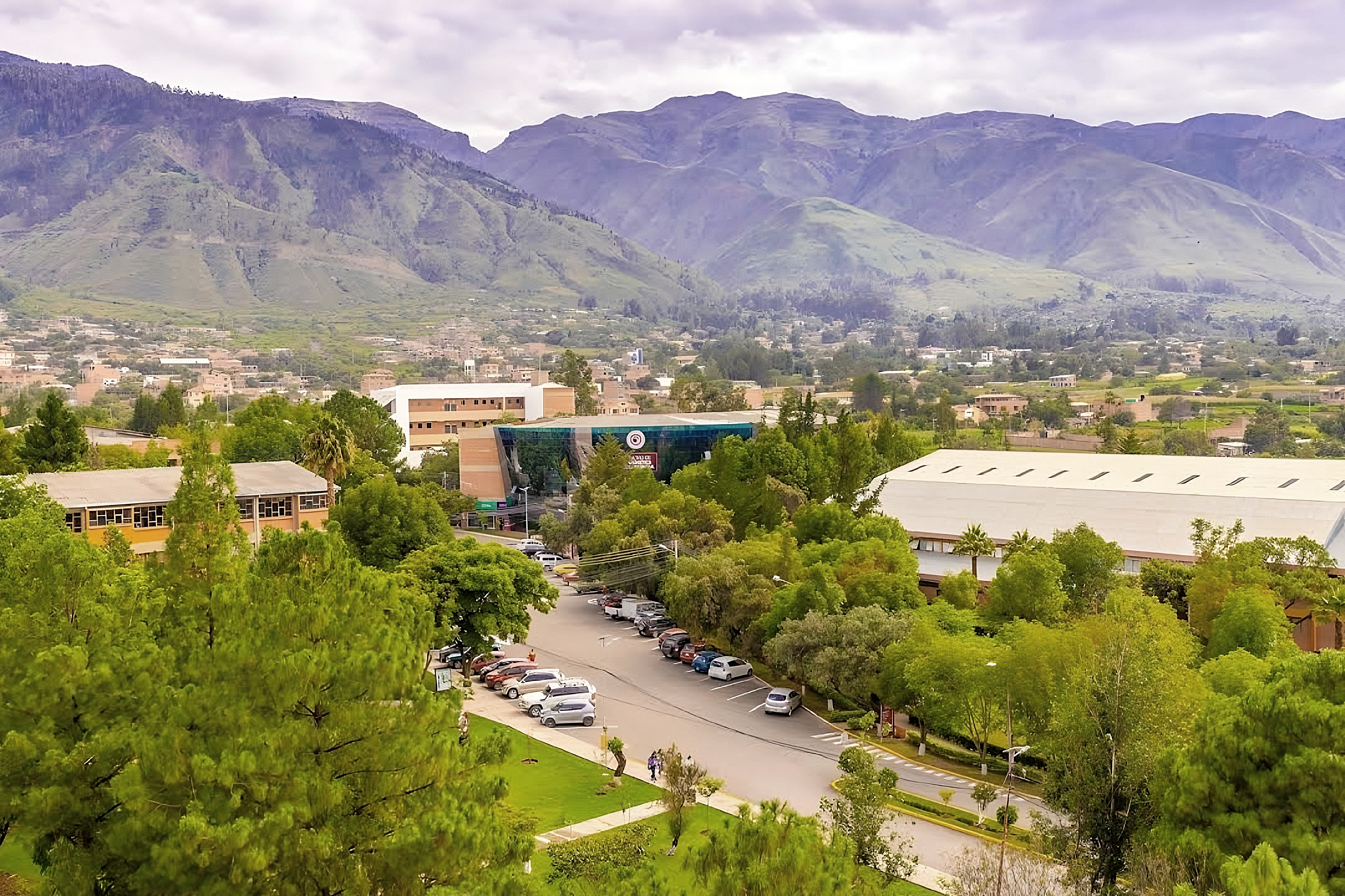
Private University of Valle

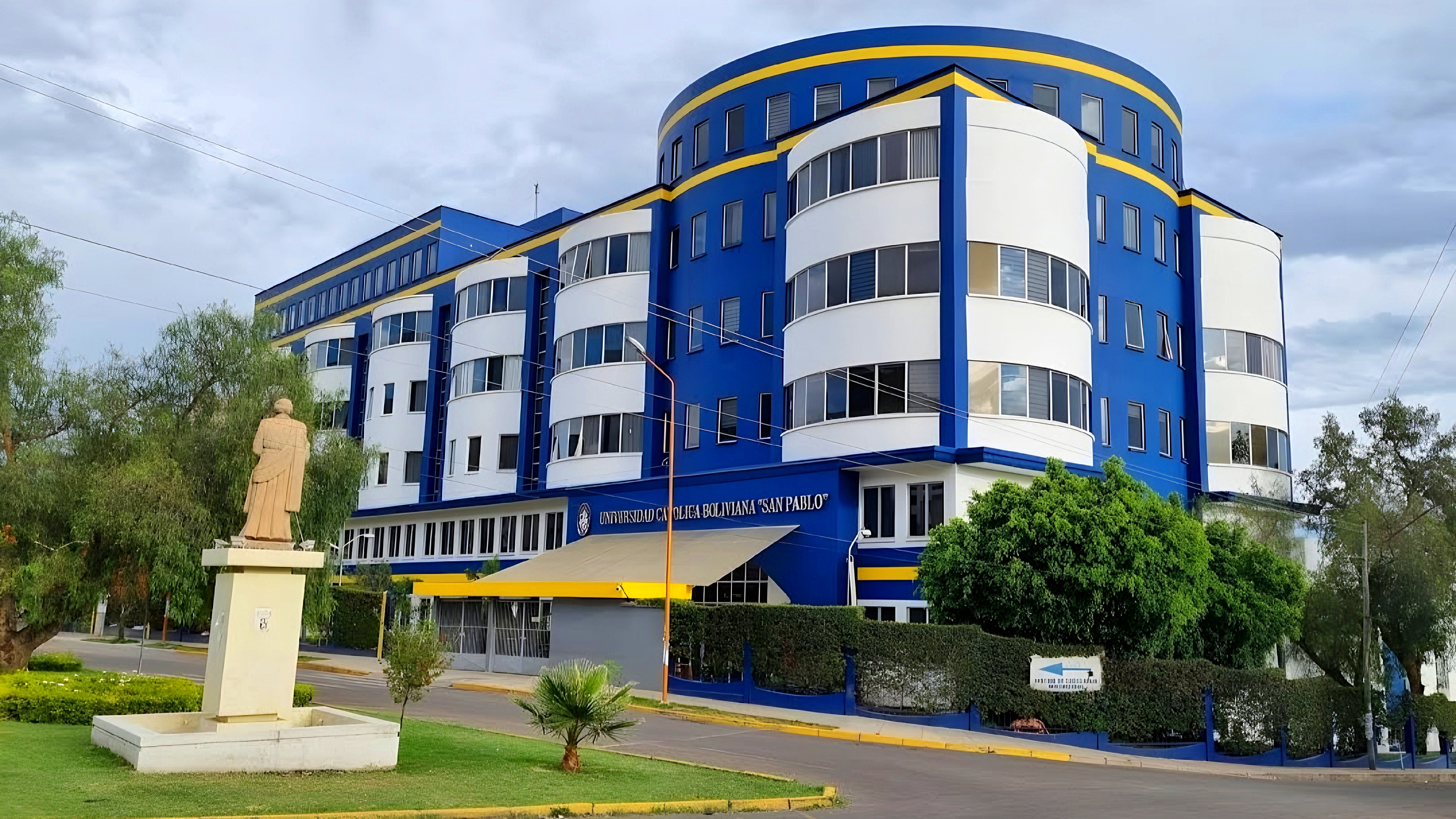
Bolivian Catholic University of San Pablo

The city is the home of the University of San Simón (UMSS, for "Universidad Mayor de San Simón"), one of the largest and most prominent public universities in Bolivia. UMSS is the second best university in Bolivia according to QS World University Rankings in 2013 but measured by the web metric scores as the first one during 2013–2017. Among the private universities in Bolivia ranking in the top ten are the Universidad Privada Boliviana (a prestigious business university), Universidad del Valle (a strong university in medicine with a large enrollment of international students) and Universidad Católica Boliviana "San Pablo". Other universities include Escuela Militar de Ingenieria "Antonio Jose de Sucre", Universidad Simón I. Patiño, Universidad de Aquino Bolivia, Universidad Adventista de Bolivia, Universidad Privada Domingo Savio and Universidad Privada Abierta Latinoamericana (UPAL). Cochabamba became the second recipient city of Brazilian students in Bolivia after the city of Santa Cruz, due to the affordable and good living conditions of the city. Also, Cochabamba is the home of one of the best schools of Bolivia, Colegio San Agustín.

== Neighborhoods ==
Cochabamba is a steadily emerging market within the Bolivian real estate industry. Since 2010, it became the city with the most surface area in construction in Bolivia overpassing Santa Cruz and La Paz. There are many middle and large buildings under construction by 2012. An annual mild climate, abundant greenery, mountain vistas, and a progressive local economy are factors that have contributed to the city's appeal to Bolivian nationals, expatriates and foreigners alike. Historic and affluent neighbourhoods such as Cala Cala, El Mirador, and Lomas de Aranjuez showcase some of the city's most distinguished residences.

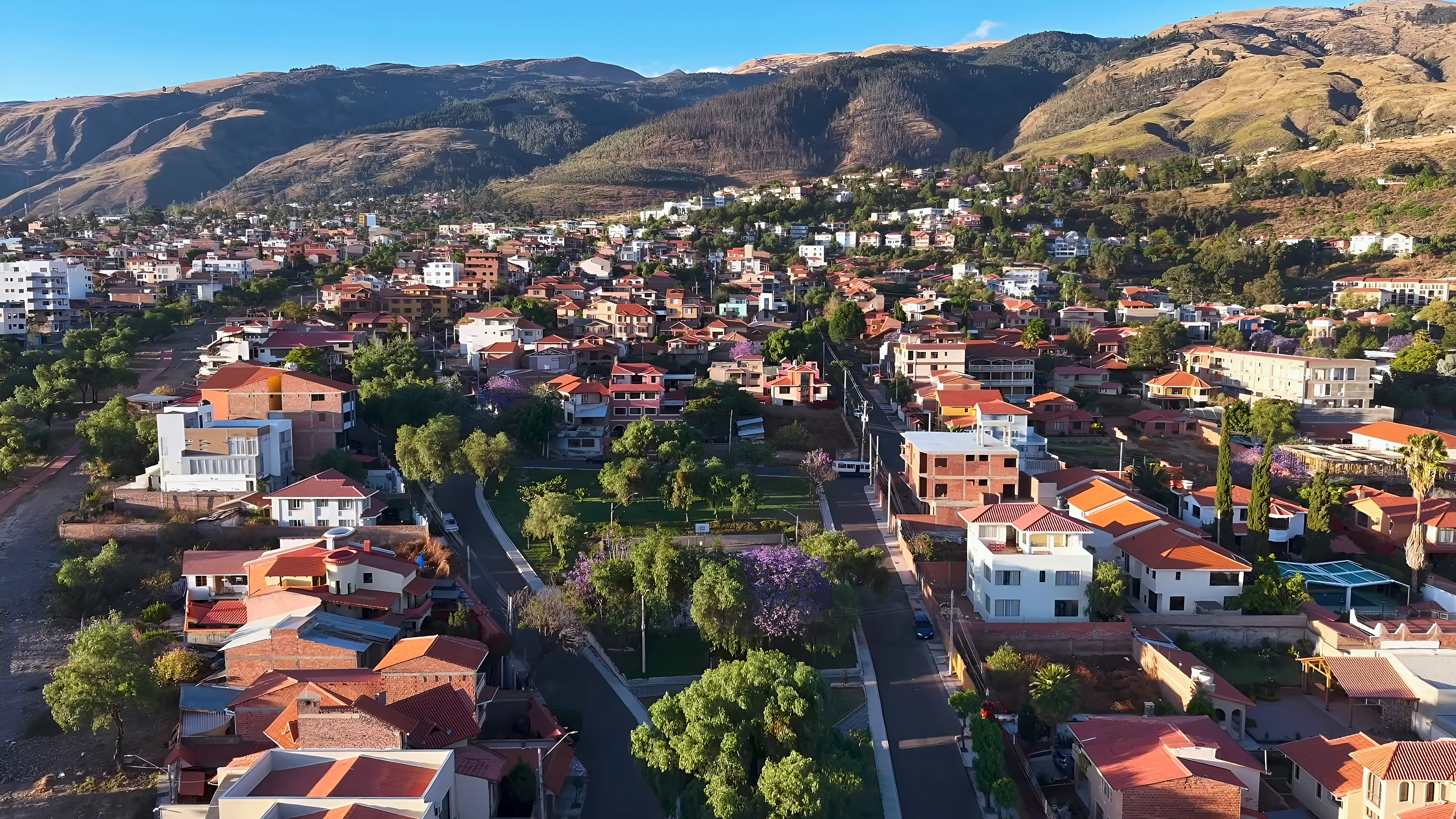
Queru Queru Neighborhood

- Queru Queru – North

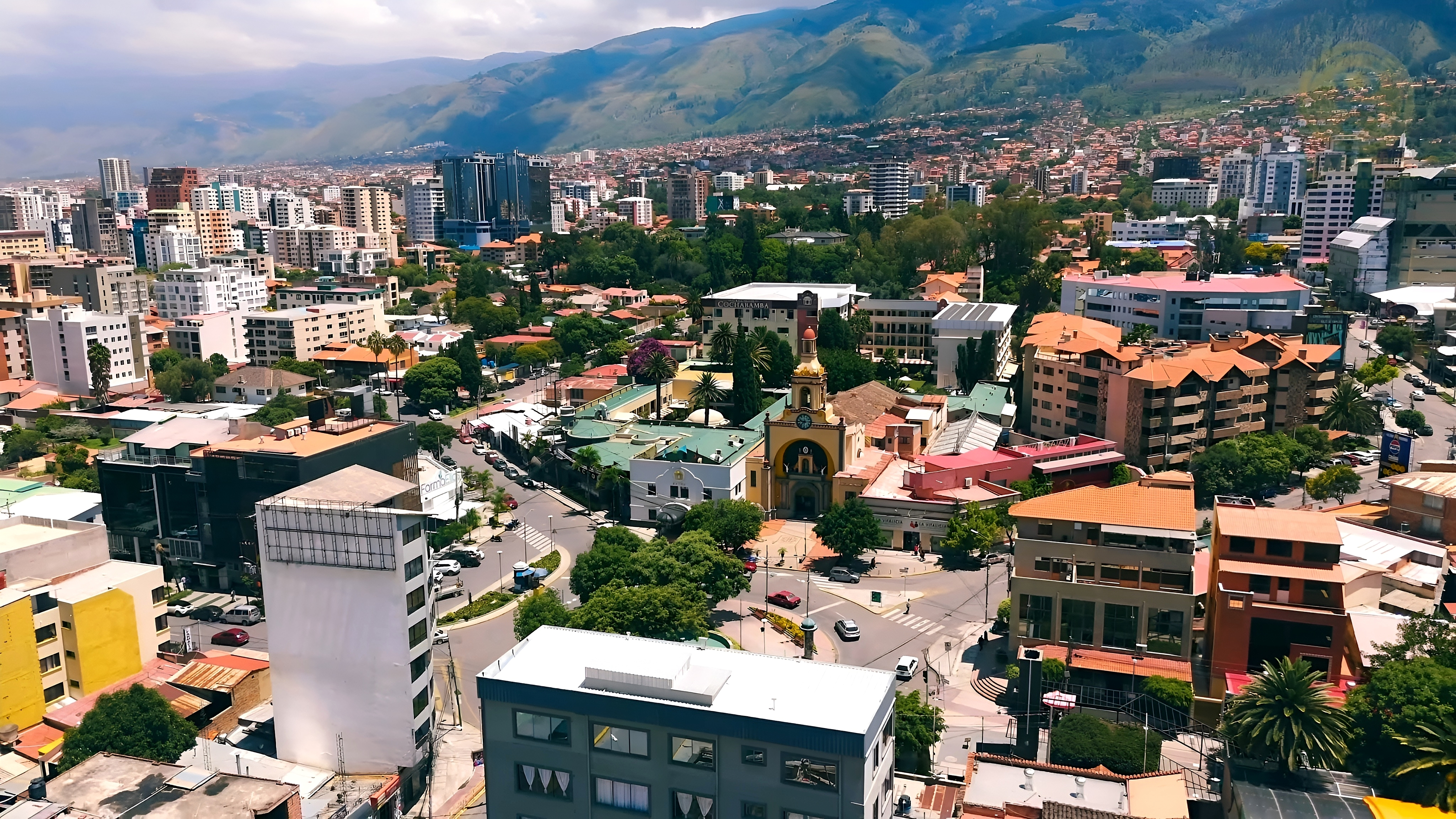
La Recoleta Zone

- La Recoleta – North

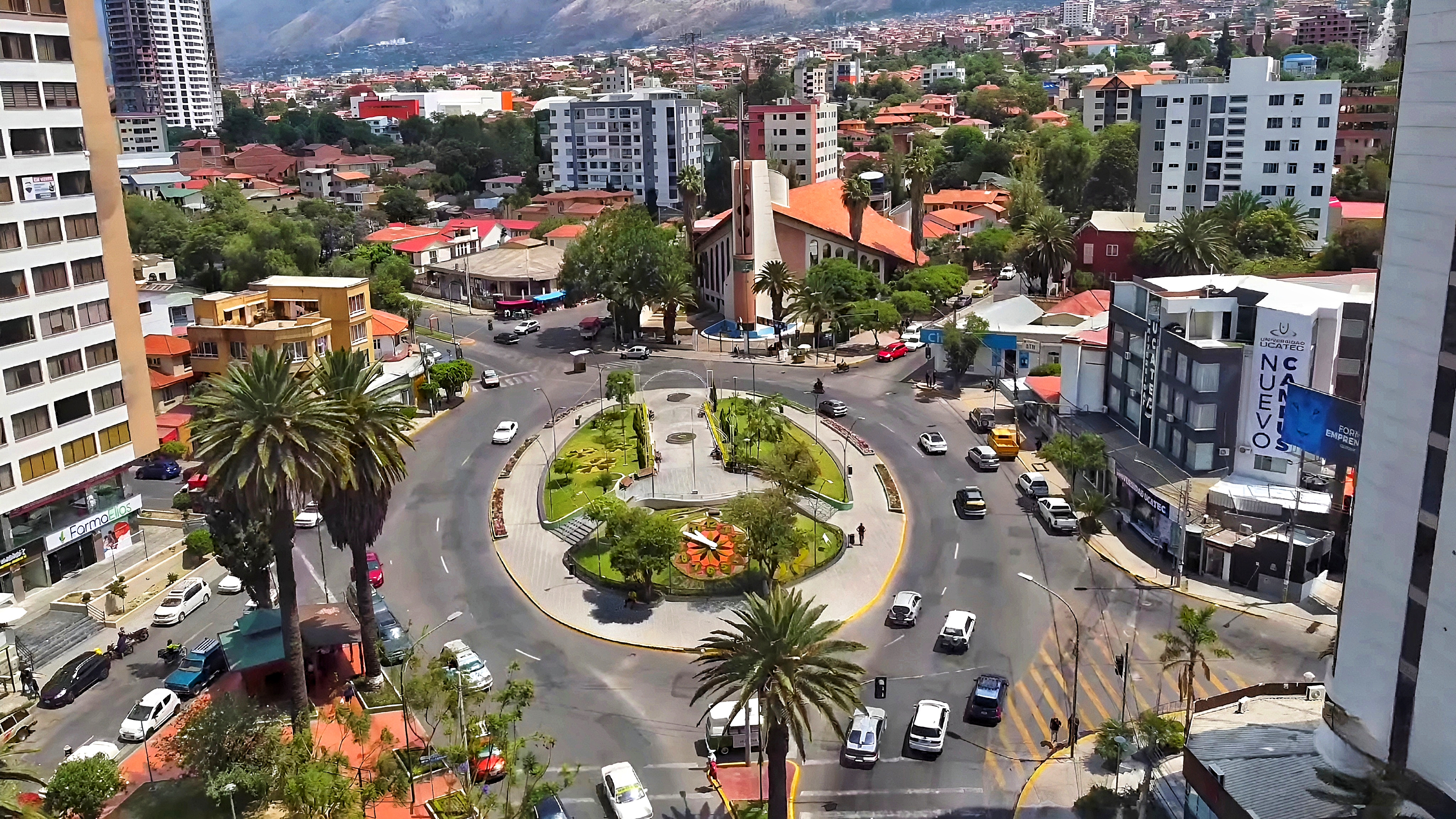
Cala Cala neighborhood

- Cala Cala – North
- Lomas de Aranjuez – North
- El Mirador – North
- Las Brisas – North
- Sarco – Northwest
- Mayorazgo – Northwest
- Barrio Profesional – Northwest
- America Oeste – Northwest
- Colquiri – Northwest

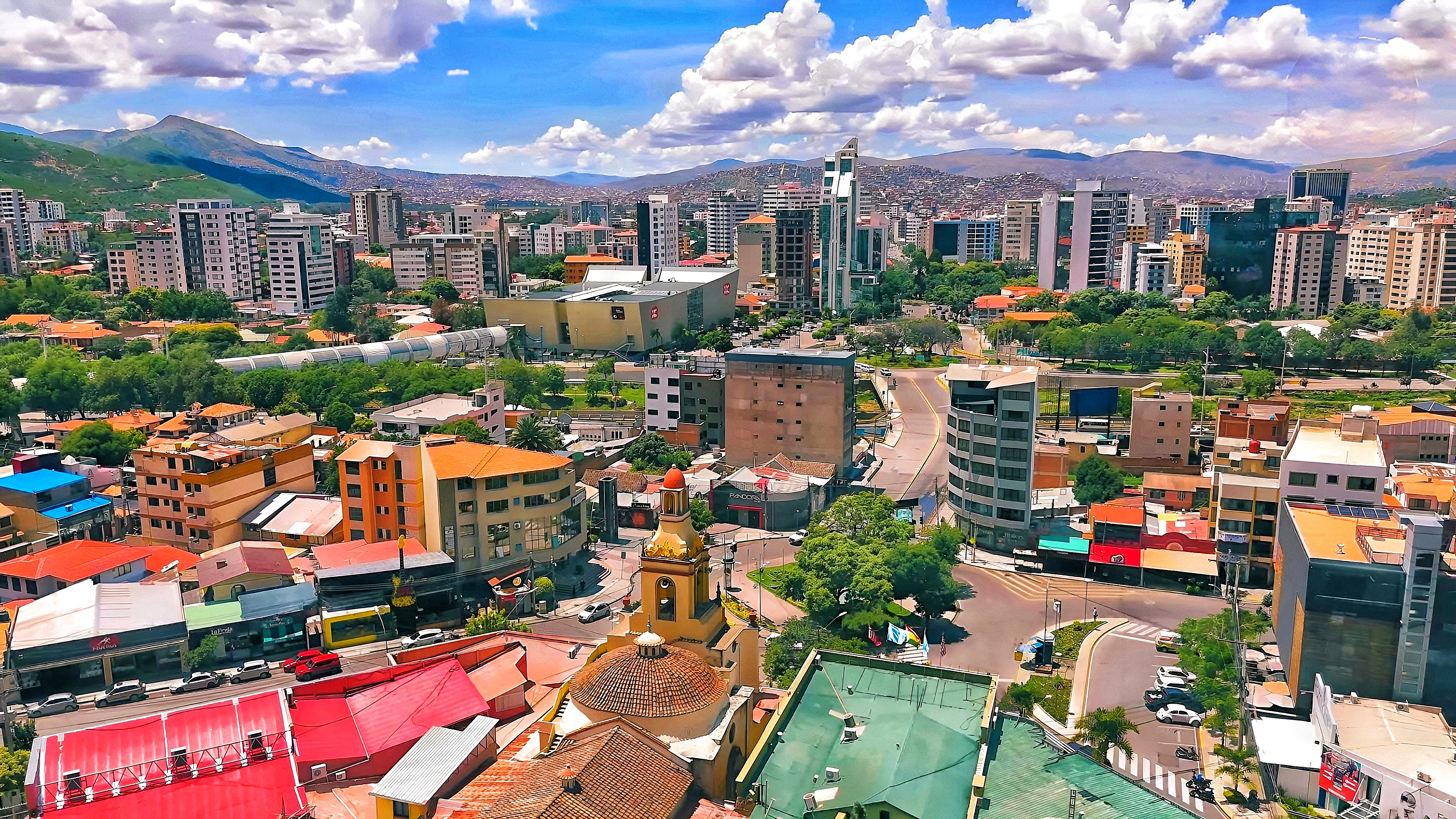
Muyurina Area

- Muyurina – Northeast
- Tupuraya – Northeast
- Hippodromo – West
- Villa Busch – West
- Temporal – North
- La Chimba – Southwest
- Aeropuerto – Southwest
- Ticti Norte – Fringe North
- Jaihuayco – South

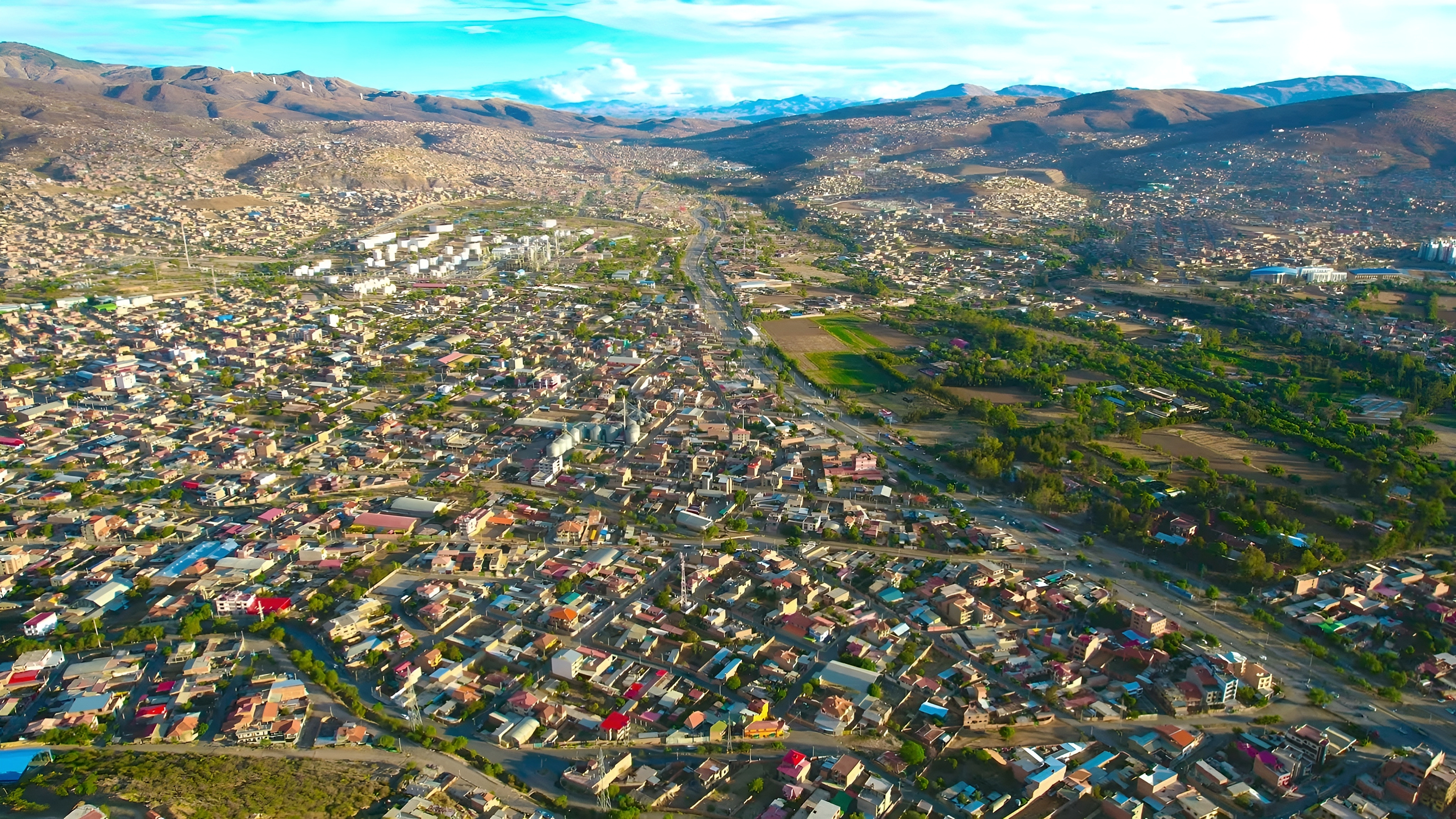
South Zone from the Alalay Lake

- Zona sud – South
- Ticti – South
- Valle Hermoso – South

=== Metropolitan area ===
Cochabamba is connected with the following towns and cities:

- Quillacollo
- Sacaba
- Vinto
- Colcapirhua
- Tiquipaya
- Cliza
- Tarata
- Ironcollo
- Punata

== Additional notes of interest ==
- Cochabamba is also mentioned in the documentary The Corporation, about their fight against the privatisation of water by a foreign-owned company, against which the people protested and won. The privatisation had gone to such an extent that even rainwater was not allowed to be collected. Read Cochabamba protests of 2000.
- Cochabamba was featured as a location in the story in the 1983 film, Scarface. Powerful drug lord Alejandro Sosa resided there, governed large coca plantations and owned cocaine labs whereupon further refining, would be shipped to Tony Montana in Florida.
- Cochabamba is the setting of the 2010 movie También la Lluvia (Even the rain), which takes place during the water war of 2000. It depicts a crew making a movie about the colonization of Latin America when the protests against privatization erupt. The film stars Mexican actor Gael García Bernal, and received positive reviews.
- Cochabamba is also the site of several major spammers, as confirmed by the watchdog group Spamhaus.

== Notable residents ==
=== Business people ===
- Simón Iturri Patiño (1862–1947), mining magnate
- Arturo Murillo, hotelier and politician

Educators and intellectuals

- Jaime Escalante, professor and teacher whose life was dramatized in the 1988 film Stand and Deliver
- Renato Prada Oropeza, professor, semiologist, writer
- Thäddeus Haenke (1761–1816), botanist
- Romina Pérez, sociologist and academic

=== Musicians ===
- Katia Escalera, Soprano
- Jaime Laredo, (b. 1941), classical violinist
- Los Kjarkas, Cochabambino folk music group

=== Literature ===
- Nataniel Aguirre (1843–1888), author
- Adela Zamudio (1874–1925), author and poet
- Jesús Lara (1898–1975), author and poet
- Gaby Vallejo Canedo (1941), author, professor of Literature
- Edmundo Paz Soldán, author
- Marcelo Quiroga Santa Cruz (1931–1980), author and politician
- Javier del Granado (1913–1996), poet laureate
- Julia Urquidi (1926–2010), writer, remembered as Mario Vargas Llosa's first wife
- Renato Prada Oropeza (1937–2011), novelist and poet
- Sara Ugarte de Salamanca, poet who had the memorial built to the heroines on 1812
- Óscar Únzaga de la Vega (1916–1959), journalist and historian

=== Other ===
- Raúl Orosco (1979), FIFA football referee
- Oscar Olivera (1955), environmental activist
- Richard T. James (1918) inventor of the slinky toy
- Klaus Barbie (1913–1991), officer of the SS and SA

== Twin towns – sister cities ==
Cochabamba is twinned with:

- Bergamo Italy, since 2008
- Córdoba, Argentina, since 1989
- Kunming, China, since 1990
- Montevideo, Uruguay since 2005
- Viedma, Argentina, since 2009
- Caracas, Venezuela, since 2009

== See also ==
- World People's Conference on Climate Change
- 2000 Cochabamba protests
- Freternindad Folklórica y Cultural Caporales Universitarios de San Simon
- 2018 South American Games
