= Ironcollo =

Ironcollo Irun Qullu
- Town
- Location within Bolivia
- Coordinates: 17°21′S 66°17′W
- Country: Bolivia
- Department: Cochabamba Department
- Province: Quillacollo Province
- Municipality: Quillacollo Municipality
- Elevation: 8,553 ft (2,607 m)

Population (2001)
  - Total: 4,778
- Time zone: UTC-4 (BOT)

Ironcollo (from Aymara Irun Qullu) is a small town in the department of Cochabamba, Bolivia.

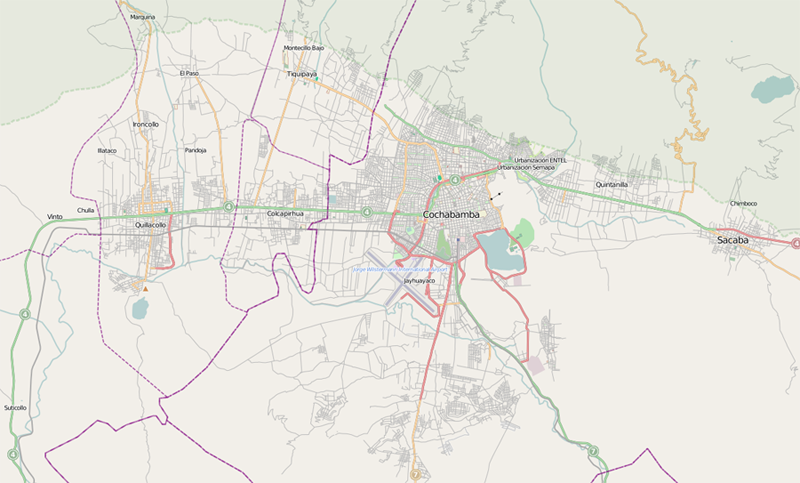
Map showing the location of Ironcollo

== See also ==
- Tunari National Park
