= Fraternindad Folklórica y Cultural Caporales Universitarios de San Simón =

The Fraternidad Folklórica y Cultural Caporales Universitarios de San Simón ("Caporales San Simón") was founded in Cochabamba, Bolivia on November 22, 1978 by a group of residents from Oruro, Bolivia, alumni of the "Universidad Mayor de San Simón". The purpose of the group was retaining and growing traditional customs of Bolivia. This group of youths decided to create a dance group of Caporales as a means to demonstrate their devotion to the Virgin Mary of the Socavón, as well as, to be able to participate in the Carnival in Oruro. For this reason, the "Universidad Mayor de San Simón" gives them support as it considers them a positive representation of Bolivian folklore.
