= TV Culturas =

Bolivian television channel

- Country: Bolivia

Programming
- Language: Spanish
- Picture format: 16:9 SDTV

Ownership
- Owner: Ministry of Cultures

History
- Launched: July 15, 2013

TV Culturas is a Bolivian television channel whose programming is based on cultural and educational content. The channel is owned by the Ministry of Cultures.

== History ==
=== First phase ===
It was founded on July 15, 2013, by the then Minister of Cultures Pablo Groux. In its beginnings, it was broadcast with 17 programs dedicated to culture and tourism. Its coverage area was limited to the trunk axis (La Paz, Santa Cruz, Cochabamba) on their respective cable companies (Cotel, Cotas and COMTECO), at an operating cost of 1,2 million bolivianos. 0.02% of the Bolivian HDI was used to finance the channel, the segment corresponded to the Civic Patriotic Education Fund.

The shows did not have hosts, as most of their programming was based on documentaries and live events. In one of their programs, they showed documentaries about Bolivian characters, among them the first interviewed was Nicolás Suárez from La Paz and the guitarist Piraí Vaca. On September 19, 2013, it launched on Multivisión in the regions where it operated, occupying a four-hour slot (7pm to 11pm) on Canal Guía Multivisión.

The channel at launch distributed content from Museo de Etnografía y Folclore (Musef), production company Nicobis, distributor Yaneramai, Centro de Formación y Realización Cinematográfica (Cefrec) and the cession of rights of works from seven national filmmakers.

=== Dissolution of ministries and suspension ===
On June 4, 2020, during Jeanine Áñez's government, three ministries were suppressed by supreme decree, among them the Ministry of Cultures and Tourism, with the Vice-Ministry of Interculturality responsible for the former ministry's operations. After weeks without control and a lack of designated authority, the channel shut down on July 10, 2020.

=== Second phase ===
On November 4, 2020, the channel's relaunch was announced, but under the new name TV Culturas, Educación y Deportes, making Bolivia TV 7.2 a parallel channel to the main one, the new format had as its goal, as part of the Ministry of Education, of creating original content, by giving an educational focus, and making distance learning.

Later, on January 21, 2021, Ministry of Cultures Sabina Orellana informed the relaunch of the channel, with the aim of being a distant learning tool.
