= La Cancha =

Market in Cochabamba, Bolivia

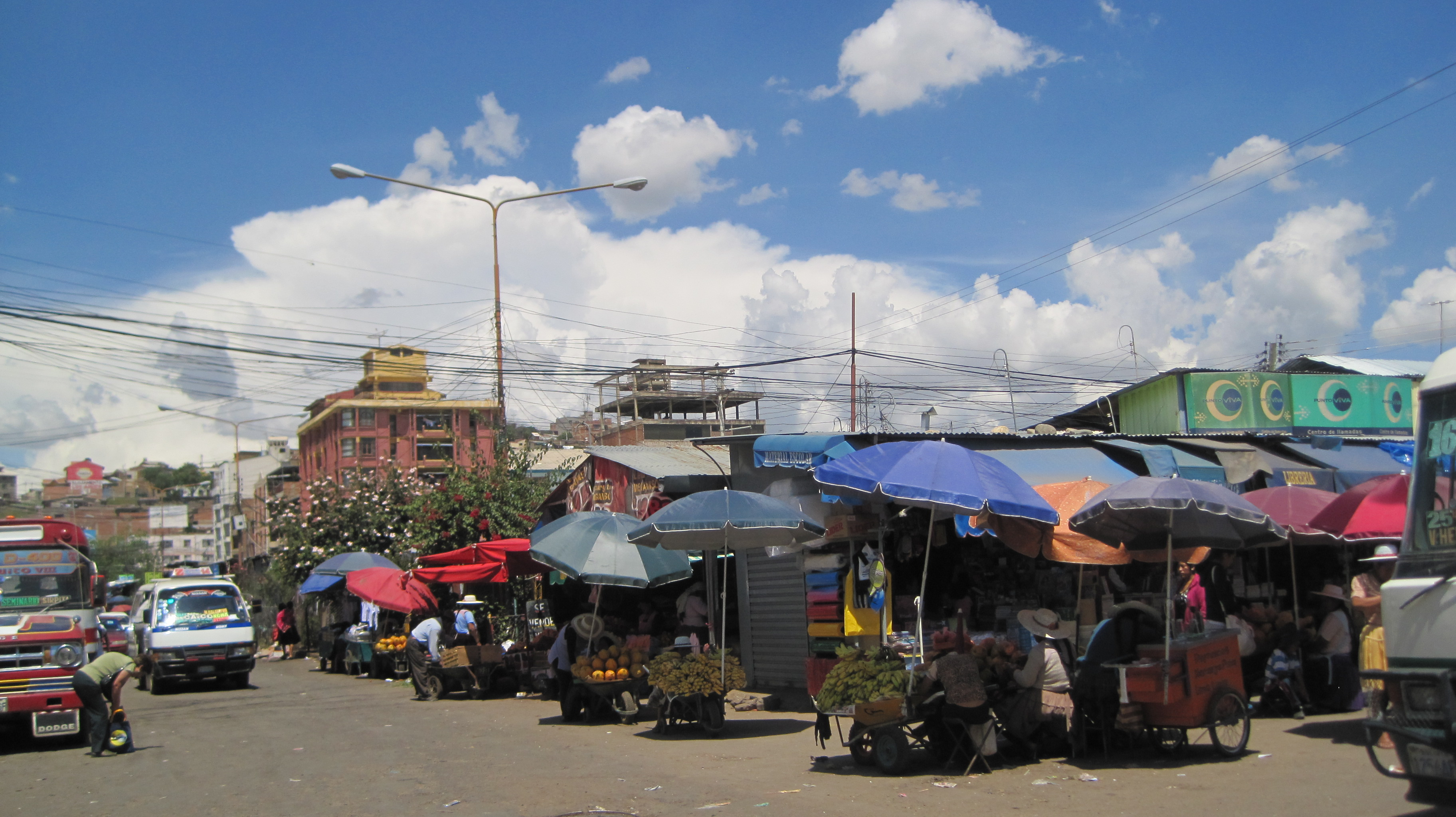
La Pampa Market

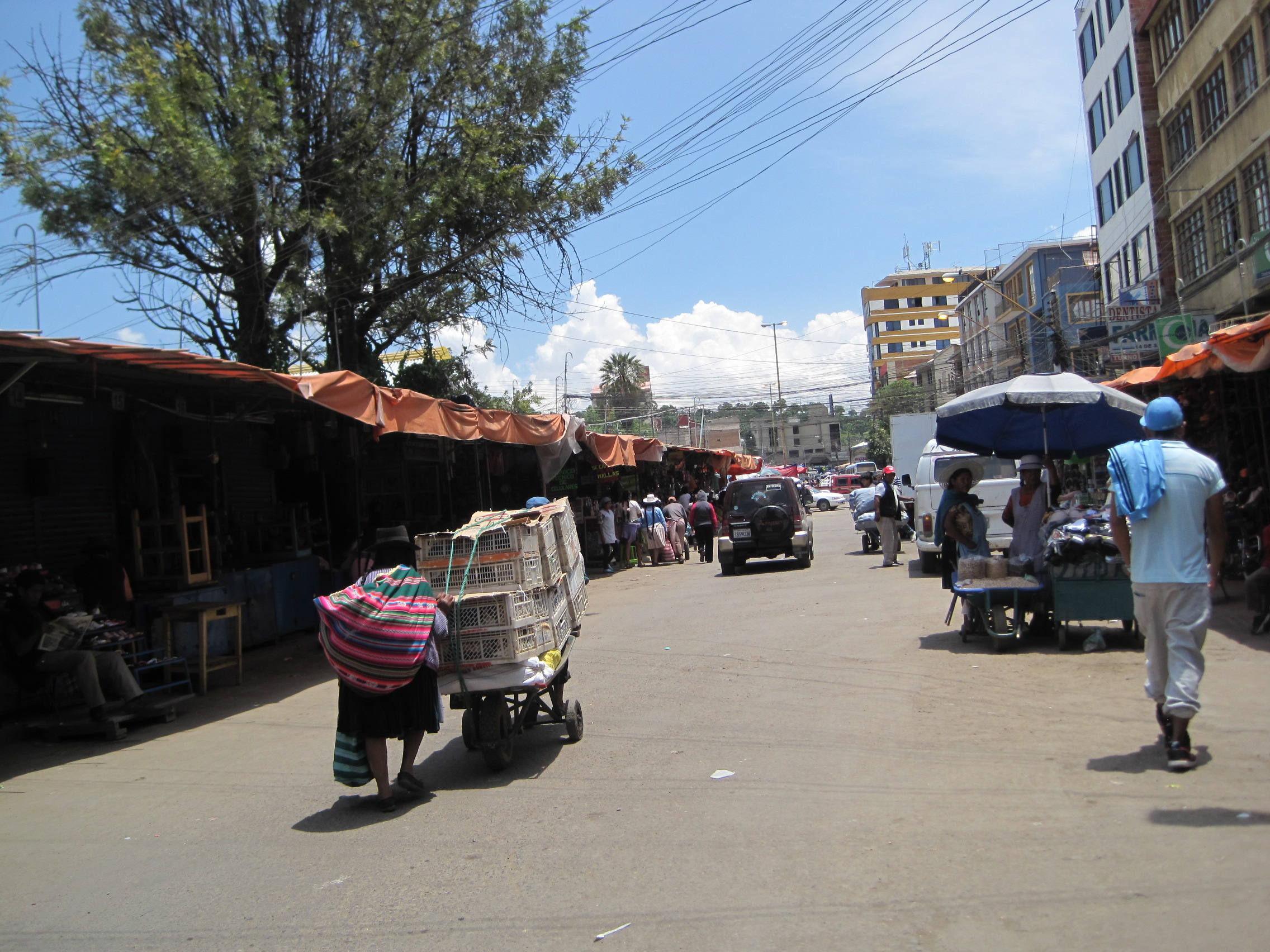
San Antonio Market

La Cancha is a commercial area located between the center and the south zones of the city of Cochabamba, Bolivia. At La Cancha, diverse items are sold: from basic goods to second-hand vehicles of varied brands, sold mainly by informal traders and street vendors.

== Markets ==
The zone is shared by five main markets:

- La Pampa Market (main center)
- Alejo Calatayud Market
- Fidel Aranibar Market
- La Paz Market
- San Antonio Market

Other smaller, private commercial centers are also present in the area, such as El Gallo or Cochabamba commercial centers, among others.

== Feria days ==
Some days every week are called "ferias". On these days, commercial activity grows in intensity. At La Cancha, ferias take place on Wednesdays and Saturdays. Economic activity in the zone is present every day of the week, but on feria days, the amount of vendors, products, and customers reaches its peak.

== Informal commerce and street vending ==
La Cancha includes a variety of traders, offering a wide selection of products. This activity is identified as informal commerce. This practice is criticized as chaotic, and only a means of subsistance.

== Handcrafts ==
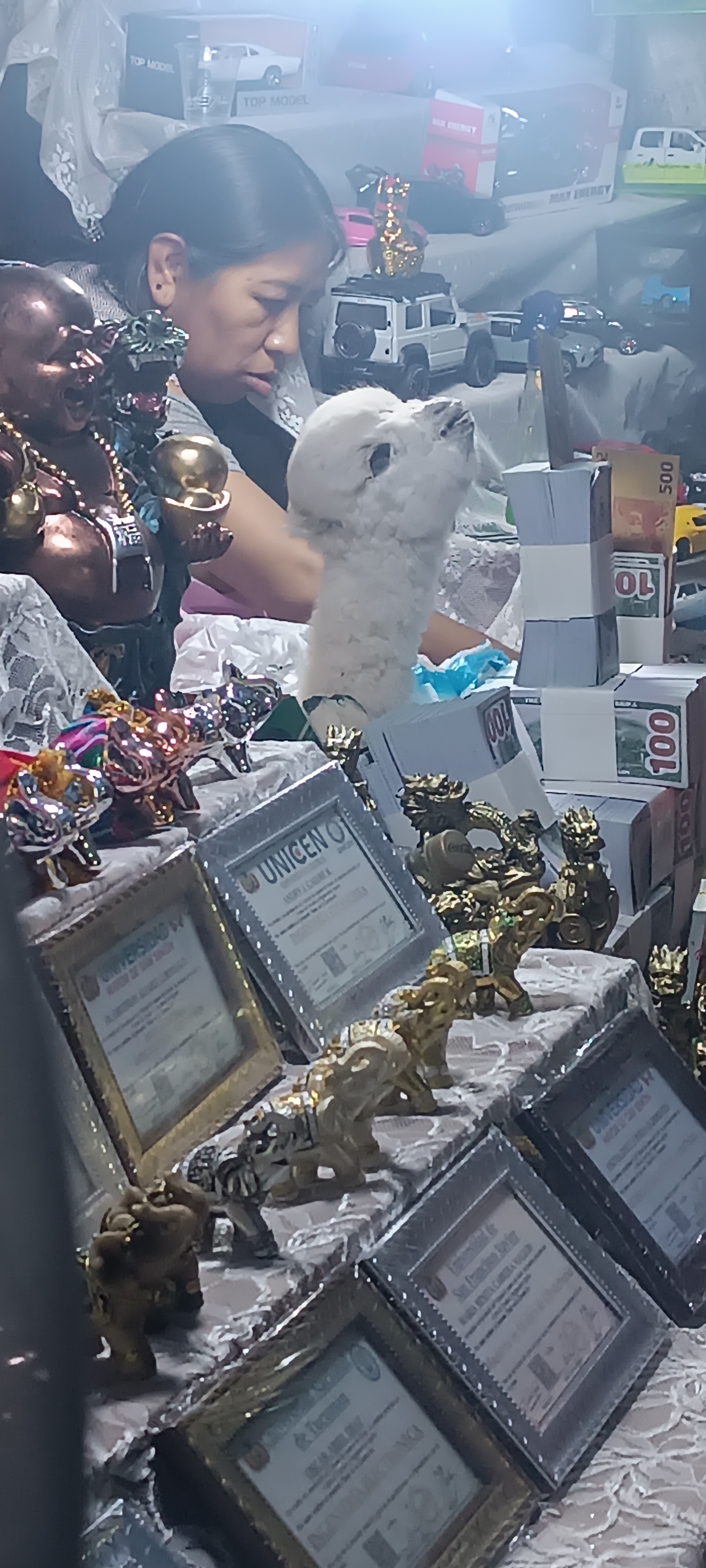
Stand showing handcrafts meant for k'oas

At La Cancha, it is possible to find a variety of handcrafts, mainly at La Pampa and San Antonio markets, although neither one is exclusively destined to the trade of handcrafts. Rather, it shares space with other products, such as clothes, food products, musical instruments and other household goods, as well as food stands. That is characteristical of La Cancha: in each one of its markets, a diverse selection of products and services are offered.

In the alleys of the La Pampa market, handcrafts vendors offer traditional clothes and footwear, furniture and woodwork, traditional medicines, spices, potions, and dissecated animals for ceremonial purposes.

At San Antonio market, the handcrafts section includes folklorical and typical costumes and textiles, decorative items, household articles in ceramic, musical instruments, abarcas (sandals made of leather or rubber), and antiques.

== Criticism ==
The high amount of vendors and customers at La Cancha produced a sturation of the urban space, including sidewalks and green spaces, which has sparked criticism and requests for intervention, seeking to mitigate issues, such as: garbage management, vehicular chaos, and difficult transit.

Vendors in the area have rejected proposals to reorganize the zone's activities. For example, the inclusion of a second floor at Calatayud market was rejected outright.
