= Cantons of Bolivia =

In Bolivia, a canton (Spanish: cantón) is an administrative division of territory one level below the municipality. Cantons were established by Article 108 of the 1967 Constitution, which placed it below the department, province, and municipality. Bolivia is divided into 1374 cantons (cantones).

Since they were not mentioned in the 2009 Constitution, cantons were officially abolished as an administrative level, but continue to exist in practice. In municipalities that have completed the municipal autonomy process, cantons have been succeeded by municipal districts.

Each canton is divide into different numbers of sub-cantons, forming an additional administrative level. Each canton was headed by a corrigedor, appointed by the executive branch of the national government.

There are individual localities or rural communities that represent the lowest level of administrative division.

== List of cantons ==
=== Beni Department ===
Department	Province	Capital	Municipality	Canton
Beni	8 Provinces	Trinidad	19 Municipalities	41 Cantons
	Cercado	Trinidad	Trinidad	Trinidad
	Cercado	Trinidad	San Javier	San Javier, San Pedro
	Iténez	Magdalena	Magdalena	Magdalena, Orobayaya
	Iténez	Magdalena	Baures	Baures, Mategua
	Iténez	Magdalena	Huacaraje	Huacaraje, El Carmen
	José Ballivián	Reyes	Reyes	Reyes, Cavinas
	José Ballivián	Reyes	San Borja	San Borja
	José Ballivián	Reyes	Santa Rosa	Santa Rosa
	José Ballivián	Reyes	Rurrenabaque	Rurrenabaque
	Mamoré	San Joaquín	San Joaquín	San Joaquin, More
	Mamoré	San Joaquín	San Ramón	San Ramón, Las Pampitas
	Mamoré	San Joaquín	Puerto Siles	Puerto Siles, Alejandria, Vigo
	Marbán	Loreto	Loreto	Loreto, Limoquije, Sachojere, San Antonio
	Marbán	Loreto	San Andrés	San Andrés, Peroto
	Moxos	San Ignacio	San Ignacio	San Ignacio, San Francisco, San Lorenzo
	Vaca Díez	Riberalta	Riberalta	Riberalta, Concepción, Florida, Ivon
	Vaca Díez	Riberalta	Guayaramerín	Guayaramerín, Villa Bella, Cachuela Esperanza, Yata
	Yacuma	Santa Ana	Santa Ana	Santa Ana, José Agustín de Palacios
	Yacuma	Santa Ana	Exaltación	Exaltación

=== Chuquisaca Department ===
Department	Province	Capital	Municipality	Canton
Chuquisaca	10 Provinces	Sucre	29 Municipalities	101 Cantons
	Azurduy	Azurduy	Villa Azurduy	Azurduy, Antonio Lopez, Las Casas
	Azurduy	Azurduy	Tarvita	Mariscal Braun, San Pedro, Tarvita
	Belisario Boeto	Villa Serrano	Villa Serrano	Mendoza, Urriolagoitia, Villa Serrano
	Hernando Siles	Monteagudo	Monteagudo	Monteagudo, San Juan del Pirai
	Hernando Siles	Monteagudo	Huacareta	Añimbo, Huacareta, Rosario del Ingre
	Jaime Zudáñez	Zudáñez	Villa Zudáñez	Zudáñez
	Jaime Zudáñez	Zudáñez	Icla	Icla
	Jaime Zudáñez	Zudáñez	Presto	Pasopaya, Presto, Rodeo
	Jaime Zudáñez	Zudáñez	Mojocoya	Mojocoya
	Luis Calvo	Villa Vaca Guzmán	Villa Vaca Guzmán	Iguembe, Sapirangui, Ticucha, Villa Vaca Guzmán
	Luis Calvo	Villa Vaca Guzmán	Macharetí	Camatindi, Carandayti, Ivo, Macharetí, Ñancorainza, Tiguipa
	Luis Calvo	Villa Vaca Guzmán	Huacaya	Boycobo, Huacaya, Santa Rosa
	Nor Cinti	Camargo	Camargo	Camargo, Lintaca, Tacaquira
	Nor Cinti	Camargo	San Lucas	Ajchilla, Chiñimayu, Kollpa, Ocuri, Payacota del Carmen, Pirhuani, San Lucas, Uruchini
	Nor Cinti	Camargo	Incahuasi	Huajlaya, Incahuasi, Pucara de Yatina
	Nor Cinti	Camargo	Villa Charcas	Villa Charcas, Santa Elena
	Oropeza	Sucre	Sucre	Arabate, Chaunaca, Chuqui Chuqui, Huanifaya, Huata, La Palca, Mamahuasi, Maragua, Mojotoro, Potolo, Quila Quila, San Lazaro, San Sebastian, Sucre
	Oropeza	Sucre	Poroma	Copavillkhi, Pojpo, Poroma, Sapse, Sijcha, Huañoma
	Oropeza	Sucre	Yotala	Huayllas, Pulqui, Tuero, Yotala
	Sud Cinti	Villa Abecia	Culpina	Culpina, El Palmar, La Cienega, La Loma, La Cueva, Pilaya, Salitre, San Francisco
	Sud Cinti	Villa Abecia	Las Carreras	Impora, Las Carreras, La Torre, Lime, San Juan, Santa Rosa, Socpora, Taraya
	Sud Cinti	Villa Abecia	Camataqui	Camataqui, Tarcana
	Tomina	Padilla	Padilla	Padilla
	Tomina	Padilla	Tomina	Tomina
	Tomina	Padilla	Sopachuy	Sopachuy
	Tomina	Padilla	El Villar	El Villar, Juana Azurduy de Padilla
	Tomina	Padilla	Villa Alcalá	Villa Alcalá
	Yamparáez	Tarabuco	Tarabuco	Tarabuco, Pajcha
	Yamparáez	Tarabuco	Yamparáez	Yamparáez, Sotomayor

=== Cochabamba Department ===
Department	Province	Capital	Municipality	Canton
Cochabamba	16 Provinces	Cochabamba	47 Municipalities	146 Cantons
	Arani	Arani	Arani	Arani, Collpa, Pocoata
	Arani	Arani	Vacas	Vacas
	Arque	Arque	Arque	Arque, Colcha
	Arque	Arque	Tacopaya	Tacopaya, Ventilla
	Ayopaya	Ayopaya or Independencia	Ayopaya	Azopaza, Calchani, Icoza
	Ayopaya	Ayopaya or Independencia	Morochata	Chinchiri, Pucarani, Punacachi, Yayani
	Ayopaya	Ayopaya or Independencia	Cocapata	Choquecamata, Cocapata, Icari
	Capinota	Capinota	Capinota	Capinota, Chamoco, Tokho Halla, Villcabamba
	Capinota	Capinota	Santiváñez	Calera, Caporaya, Caraza, Chojtama, Huañacota, Poquera, Santiváñez
	Capinota	Capinota	Sicaya	Orcoma, Sicaya
	Carrasco	Totora	Totora	Arepucho, Icuna, Tiraque "C", Totora
	Carrasco	Totora	Puerto Villarroel	Ivirgarzama, Mariposas, Puerto Villarroel, Valle Ivirza
	Carrasco	Totora	Pojo	Chalguani, Chuquiomo, Duraznillo, Guarayos, Mamoré, Palca, Pojo, Real, Rodeo
	Carrasco	Totora	Chimoré	Chimoré
	Carrasco	Totora	Pocona	Chimboata, Chillicchi, Conda, Huayapacha, Pocona
	Carrasco	Totora	Entre Ríos	Entre Ríos
	Cercado	Cochabamba	Cochabamba	Cochabamba
	Chapare	Sacaba	Sacaba	Aguirre, Chiñata, Lava Lava, Quewiñapampa, Sacaba, Ucuchi
	Chapare	Sacaba	Villa Tunari	Mendoza, Paracti, Villa Tunari
	Chapare	Sacaba	Colomi	Candelaria, Colomi, San José, Tablas Monte
	Esteban Arce	Tarata	Tarata	Huayculi, Huasa Rancho, Izata, Tarata
	Esteban Arce	Tarata	Anzaldo	Anzaldo, La Viña, Quiriria
	Esteban Arce	Tarata	Arbieto	Arbieto, Aranjuez, Arpita
	Esteban Arce	Tarata	Sacabamba	Apillapa, Challaque, Matarani, Quekoma, Sacabamba
	Germán Jordán	Cliza	Cliza	Chullpas, Cliza, Huasacalle, Santa Lucía
	Germán Jordán	Cliza	Toco	Toco
	Germán Jordán	Cliza	Tolata	Tolata
	Mizque	Mizque	Mizque	Mizque, Cauta, Molinero, Taboada, Tin Tin, Vicho Vicho
	Mizque	Mizque	Alalay	Alalay, Ayapampa
	Mizque	Mizque	Vila Vila	Vila Vila, Siquimira
	Campero	Aiquile	Aiquile	Aiquile, Quiroga, Villa Granado
	Campero	Aiquile	Omereque	Chari Cari, Ele Ele, Huanacuni Grande, Omereque, Peña Colorada, Perereta
	Campero	Aiquile	Pasorapa	Pasorapa
	Punata	Punata	Punata	Punata
	Punata	Punata	San Benito	Huaricya, San Benito, Sunchu Pampa
	Punata	Punata	Villa Rivero	Villa Rivero
	Punata	Punata	Cuchumuela	Cuchumuela
	Punata	Punata	Tacachi	Tacachi
	Quillacollo	Quillacollo	Quillacollo	El Paso, Quillacollo
	Quillacollo	Quillacollo	Colcapirhua	Colcapirhua, Santa Rosa
	Quillacollo	Quillacollo	Tiquipaya	Tiquipaya
	Quillacollo	Quillacollo	Vinto	Anocaraire, La Chulla, Machac Marca, Vinto
	Quillacollo	Quillacollo	Sipe Sipe	Itapaya, Mallco Rancho, Sipe Sipe
	Bolívar	Bolívar	Bolívar	Bolívar, Carpani, Challoma, Comuna, Coyuna, Jorenko, Vilacaya, Villa Victoria, Yarbicoya
	Tapacarí	Tapacarí	Tapacarí	Challa, Leque, Ramadas, Tapacarí
	Tiraque	Tiraque	Tiraque	Palca, Tiraque
	Tiraque	Tiraque	Shinahota	Shinahota

=== La Paz Department ===
Department	Province	Capital	Municipality	Canton
La Paz	20 Provinces	La Paz	82 Municipalities	431 Cantons
	Abel Iturralde	Ixiamas	Ixiamas	Ixiamas
	Abel Iturralde	Ixiamas	San Buenaventura	San Buena Ventura
	Aroma	Sica Sica	Sica Sica	Ayamaya, Chijmuni, Colpapucho Belen, Germán Busch, Kajani, Machacamarca, Manuel Isodoro Belzu, Panduro, Pujravi, Sica Sica, Villa Chuakhollu Grande
	Aroma	Sica Sica	Umala	Asunción Huancaroma, Cañaviri, Llanga Belen, Puerto Huari Belen, San José de Llanga, San Miguel de Copani, Santiago de Collana, Umala, Vituy Vinto
	Aroma	Sica Sica	Ayo Ayo	Collana Tolar, Santa Rosa de Lima, Tupac Katari, Villa Carmen
	Aroma	Sica Sica	Calamarca	Ajoya, Calamarca, Cosmini, San Antonio de Senkata, Sivincani, Vilaque Copata, Villa El Carmen de Caluyo
	Aroma	Sica Sica	Patacamaya	Chacoma, Chairumani, Chiaraque, Colchani, Culta Arajllanga, Iquiaca de Umala, Patacamaya, Pusuta, San Martin de Iquiaca, Villa Concepción de Belen, Villa Patarani, Viscachani
	Aroma	Sica Sica	Colquencha	Colquencha, Marquirivi, Micaya, Nueva Esperanza de Machacamarca, Santiago de Llallagua
	Aroma	Sica Sica	Collana	Collana, Collana Uncallamaya, Hichuaraya Chico
	Bautista Saavedra	Charazani	Juan José Pérez	Amarete, Carijana, Chari, Chullina, General Juan José Pérez (Charazani), Ramon Gonzales, Santa Rosa de Caata
	Bautista Saavedra	Charazani	Curva	Calaya, Camsaya, Comunidad Puli, Curva, Kapna, Lagunillas, Taypi Cañuhuma, Upinhuaya
	Caranavi	Caranavi	Caranavi	Alcoche, Alto Illimani, Belen, Calama, Caranavi, Carrasco, Carrasco La Reserva, Chojña, Choro, Eduardo Avaroa, Inicua Bajo, Incahuara de Ckullu Kuchu, Rosario Entre Ríos, San Pablo, Santa Ana de Alto Beni, Santa Ana de Caranavi, Santa Fe, Santa Rosa, Suapi de Alto Beni, Taypiplaya, Uyunense, Villa Elevacion
	Eliodoro Camacho	Puerto Acosta	Puerto Acosta	Chiñaya 6 de Agosto, Collasuyo, Escoma, Peninsula de Challapata, Puerto Acosta, Puerto Parajachi, San Juan de Cancanani, Umanata, Villa Puni
	Eliodoro Camacho	Puerto Acosta	Mocomoco	Italaque, Mocomoco, Pacaures, Tajani, Villa Rosario de Wila Khala
	Eliodoro Camacho	Puerto Acosta	Puerto Carabuco	Ambana, Puerto Carabuco, Puerto Chaguaya, San Miguel de Yaricoa
	Franz Tamayo	Apolo	Apolo	Apolo, Aten, Mojos, Pata, Santa Cruz del Valle Ameno
	Franz Tamayo	Apolo	Pelechuco	Antaquilla de Copacabana, Pelechuco, Suches, Ulla Ulla
	Gualberto Villarroel	San Pedro de Curahuara	San Pedro de Curahuara	Chilahuala, Conchari, German Busch, Jalsuri, Jankho Marca, Pedro Domingo Murillo, Puerto Capitan Castrillo, Río Mulato Kari, San Pedro de Curahuara, Villa Manquiri, Waldo Ballivian
	Gualberto Villarroel	San Pedro de Curahuara	Papel Pampa	Caylla Churo, Circa Cruzani, Eduardo Abaroa, Molle Bamba, Pacollo, Papel Pampa, Rivera Alta, San Felipe de Challa, Unopata
	Gualberto Villarroel	San Pedro de Curahuara	Chacarilla	Chacarilla, Puerto Aroma, Rosa Pata
	Ingavi	Viacha	Tiwanaku	Huacullani, Pillapi San Agustín, Tiwanaku
	Ingavi	Viacha	Viacha	Chacoma Irpa Grande, General José Ballivian, Ichuraya Grande, Irpuma Irpa Grande, Viacha, Villa Remedíos, Villa Santiago de Chacoma
	Ingavi	Viacha	Guaqui	Guaqui
	Ingavi	Viacha	Desaguadero	Desaguadero, San Juan de Huancollo
	Ingavi	Viacha	San Andrés de Machaca	Chuncarcota de Machaca, Conchacollo de Machaca, Laquinamaya, Mauri, Nazacara, San Andrés de Machaca, Sombra Pata, Villa Artasivi de Machaca, Villa Pusuma Alto Machaca
	Ingavi	Viacha	Jesús de Machaca	Aguallamaya, Chama, Cuipa España de Machaca, Jesús de Machaca, Kalla Tupac Katari, Khonkho San Salvador, Mejillones de Machaca, Santa Ana de Machaca, Santo Domingo de Machaca, Villa Asunción de Machaca
	Ingavi	Viacha	Taraco	Santa Rosa de Taraco, Taraco
	Inquisivi	Inquisivi	Inquisivi	Arcopongo, Capiñata, Cavari, Eduardo Abaroa, Escola, Inquisivi, Pocusco, Siguas
	Inquisivi	Inquisivi	Cajuata	Cajuata, Circuata, Huaritolo, Suri
	Inquisivi	Inquisivi	Colquiri	Caluyo, Colquiri, Coriri, Huayllamarca, Lanza, Pauca, Villa Hancacota, Uyuni
	Inquisivi	Inquisivi	Ichoca	Franz Tamayo, General Camacho, German Busch, Gualberto Villarroel, Ichoca, Luruhuata, Villa San Antonio Sirarani
	Inquisivi	Inquisivi	Licoma	Charapaxi, Licoma
	Inquisivi	Inquisivi	Quime	Choquetanga, Figueroa, Huaña Cota, Quime
	José Manuel Pando	Santiago de Machaca	Santiago de Machaca	Bautista Saavedra, Berenguela, Exaltación, General José Ballivian, Santiago de Huari Pujio, Santiago de Machaca
	José Manuel Pando	Santiago de Machaca	Catacora	Catacora, Pairumani Grande, Pojo Pajchiri, Thola Khollu
	Larecaja	Sorata	Sorata	Ankoma, Chuchulaya, Guachalla, Obispo Bosque, San Antonio de Millipaya, Sorata, Yani
	Larecaja	Sorata	Combaya	Combaya, San Pedro de Sorejaya,
	Larecaja	Sorata	Guanay	Guanay, San Juan de Challana, Santa Rosa
	Larecaja	Sorata	Mapiri	Mapiri
	Larecaja	Sorata	Quiabaya	Quiabaya
	Larecaja	Sorata	Tacacoma	Ananea, Chumisa, Collabamba, Consata, Tacacoma,
	Larecaja	Sorata	Teoponte	Teoponte
	Larecaja	Sorata	Tipuani	Carguarani, Cotapampa, Paniagua, Tipuani
	Loayza	Luribay	Luribay	Anchallani, Eduardo Abaroa Colliri, Luribay, Poroma, Porvenir, Taucarasi
	Loayza	Luribay	Sapahaqui	Caracato, Muruhuta, Sapahaqui
	Loayza	Luribay	Cairoma	Asiento Araca, Cairoma, Keraya, Saya, Tienda Pata
	Loayza	Luribay	Yaco	Caxata, Challoma, Chucamarca, Llipi Llipi, Tablachaca, Umalaco, Villa Puchuni, Yaco
	Loayza	Luribay	Malla	Coque, Malla, Rodeo
	Los Andes	Pucarani	Pucarani	Catavi, Chojasivi, Cohana, Lacaya, Patamanta, Pucarani, Villa Ascencion de Chipamaya, Villa Iquiaca, Villa Pabon de Chiarpata, Villa Rosario de Corapata, Villa Vilaque
	Los Andes	Pucarani	Batallas	Batallas, Huancane, Karhuisa, Kerani, Peñas, Villa Asuncion Tuquia, Villa San Juan de Chachacomani, Villa Remedios de Calasaya
	Los Andes	Pucarani	Laja	Collo Collo, Curva Pucara, Laja, San Juan Rosario, Tambillo, Villa San Juan de Satatotora
	Los Andes	Pucarani	Puerto Pérez	Aygachi, Cascachi, Puerto Pérez, Suriqui
	Manco Kapac	Copacabana	Copacabana	Copacabana, Lokha, Zampaya
	Manco Kapac	Copacabana	San Pedro de Tiquina	Calata de San Martin, San Pablo de Tiquina, San Pedro de Tiquina, Santiago de Ojje, Villa Amacari
	Manco Kapac	Copacabana	Tito Yupanki	Tito Yupanki
	Muñecas	Chuma	Chuma	Chajlaya, Chuma, Luquisani, Sococoni, Timusi, Tuiluni
	Muñecas	Chuma	Ayata	Ayapata, Camata
	Muñecas	Chuma	Aucapata	Aucapata, Pusillani
	Nor Yungas	Coroico	Coroico	Coroico, Mururata, Pacollo
	Nor Yungas	Coroico	Coripata	Arapata, Coripata, Milluhuaya
	Omasuyos	Achacachi	Achacachi	Achacachi, Ajllata Grande, Chua Cocani, Chuavisalaya, Franz Tamayo, Huatajata, Jancko Amaya, Soncachi, Villa Asuncion de Corpaputo, Warisata
	Omasuyos	Achacachi	Ancoraimes	Ancoraimes, Cajiata, Cheje Pampa, Chojñapata-Chiñaja, Sotalaya, Villa Macamaca
	Omasuyos	Achacachi	Huarina	Copancara, Huarina
	Omasuyos	Achacachi	Santiago de Huata	Kalaque, Santiago de Huata
	Pacajes	Coro Coro	Coro Coro	Caquingora, Coro Coro, Jancko Marca Sirpa, Jayuma Llallagua, José Manuel Pando, Muro Pilar Mjillones, Porvenir de Quilloma, Rosapata Huancarama, Topohoco, Villa Exaltacion de Enequella
	Pacajes	Coro Coro	Caquiaviri	Achiri, Antaquira, Caquiaviri, Chojñapampa de Vichaya, Jihuacuta, Kasillunca, Laura Lloko Lloko, Tincachi, Vichaya, Villa Anta, Villa Chocorosi
	Pacajes	Coro Coro	Calacoto	Audiencia, Calacoto, Caracollo, Challuyo, General Camacho, General Campero, Laguna Blanca, Max Toledo, Okoruro, Playa Verde, Rosario, Ulloma, Villa Condor Iquiña
	Pacajes	Coro Coro	Comanche	Comanche, General José Ballivián, Rosas Pata Tuli, Tocopilla Cantuyo
	Pacajes	Coro Coro	Charaña	Charaña, Chinocavi, Eduardo Abaroa, General Perez, Ladislao Cabrera, Río Blanco
	Pacajes	Coro Coro	Waldo Ballivián	Waldo Ballivián (C. Tumarapi)
	Pacajes	Coro Coro	Santiago de Callapa	Calteca, Romero Pampa, San Francisco de Yaribay, Santiago de Callapa, Villa Puchuni
	Pacajes	Coro Coro	Nazacara de Pacajes	Nazacara de Pacajes
	Murillo	Palca	La Paz	La Paz, Zongo
	Murillo	Palca	Palca	Cohoni, Palca, Qillihuaya
	Murillo	Palca	Mecapaca	Chanka, Collana, Mecapaca, Santiago de Collana
	Murillo	Palca	Achocalla	Achocalla, Asunta Quillviri, Villa Concepción
	Murillo	Palca	El Alto	El Alto
	Sud Yungas	Chulumani	Chulumani	Chirca, Chulumani, Huancane, Ocobaya, Villa Asunta
	Sud Yungas	Chulumani	La Asunta	Calisaya, Chamaca, Charia, Colopampa Grande, Cotopata, Huayabal, La Asunta, La Calzada, Las Mercedes, Puerto Rico, San José, Villa Barrientos, Yanamayu
	Sud Yungas	Chulumani	Palos Blancos	Palos Blancos
	Sud Yungas	Chulumani	Irupana	Chicaloma, Irupana, Lambate, Laza, Taca, Victorio Lanza
	Sud Yungas	Chulumani	Yanacachi	Villa Aspiazu, Yanacachi

=== Oruro Department ===
Department	Province	Capital	Municipality	Canton
Oruro	16 Provinces	Oruro	34 Municipalities	160 Cantons
	Atahuallpa	Sabaya	Sabaya	Alaroco, Bella Vista, Cahuana, Cruz de Huayllas, Julo, Negrillos, Pacariza, Pagador, Parajaya, Pisiga Bolivar Sucre, Quea Queani, Sabaya, Sacabaya, San Antonio de Pitacollo, Tunape, Villa Rosario, Villa Vitalina
	Atahuallpa	Sabaya	Chipaya	Ayparavi, Chipaya, Vestrullani
	Atahuallpa	Sabaya	Coipasa	Coipasa
	Carangas	Corque	Corque	Caracota, Copacabanita, Corque, Jancocala, Laca Laca Quita Quita, Opoqueri, Payoco, Pomata Aite, San Antonio de Arcala, San Jose de Kala, San Pedro de Huaylloco, Villa Esperanza, Villa Tarucachi
	Carangas	Corque	Choquecota	Asuncion Laca Laca, Choquecota
	Cercado	Oruro	Oruro	9 de Abril (Thola Palca), Huayña Pasto Grande, Iruma, Lequepalca, Oruro, Paria, Soracachi, Teniente Bullain
	Cercado	Oruro	Caracollo	Caracollo, Kemalla, Lajma, La Joya, Sillota vito, Sillota Belen, Vilacara
	Cercado	Oruro	El Choro	Challacollo, Crucero Belen, El Choro, Rancho Grande, San Felipe de Chaitavi
	Eduardo Avaroa	Challapata	Challapata	Ancacato, Challapata, Culta, Huancane
	Eduardo Avaroa	Challapata	Santuario de Quillacas	Santuario de Quillacas, Sevaruyo, Soraga
	Ladislao Cabrera	Salinas de Garcí Mendoza	Salinas de Garcí Mendoza	Aroma, Challacota, Concepción de Belén, Jirira, Salinas de Garcí Mendoza, San Martin, Ucumasi, Villa Esperanza
	Ladislao Cabrera	Salinas de Garcí Mendoza	Pampa Aullagas	Bengal Vinto, Ichalula, Pampa Aullagas
	Litoral	Huachacalla	Huachacalla	Huachacalla
	Litoral	Huachacalla	Esmeralda	Belén, Esmeralda, Pena Penani, Romero Pampa
	Litoral	Huachacalla	Cruz de Machacamarca	Cruz de Machamarca, Florida, Huayllas
	Litoral	Huachacalla	Escara	Escara, Payrumani del Litoral
	Litoral	Huachacalla	Yunguyo del Litoral	Yunguyo
	Nor Carangas	Huayllamarca	Huayllamarca	Belen de Choquecota, Bella Vista, Chojnahuma, Chuquichambi, Huayllamarca, LLanquera, Puerto Nequeta, San Miguel, Tunupa
	Pantaléon Dalence	Huanuni	Villa Huanuni	Bombo, Cataricahua, Huallatiri, Huanuni, Morococala, Negro Pabellon
	Pantaléon Dalence	Huanuni	Machacamarca	Machacamarca, Vicente Ascarrunz
	Poopó	Poopó	Poopó	Coripata, Poopó, Venta y Media
	Poopó	Poopó	Pazña	Avicaya, Pazña, Peñas, Totoral, Urmíri
	Poopó	Poopó	Antequera	Antequera, Chalguamayu, Tutuni
	Puerto de Mejillones	La Rivera	La Rivera	La Rivera
	Puerto de Mejillones	La Rivera	Todos Santos	Todos Santos
	Puerto de Mejillones	La Rivera	Carangas	Carangas
	Sajama	Curahuara de Carangas	Curahuara de Carangas	Caripe, Curahuara de Carangas, Laguna, Sajama
	Sajama	Curahuara de Carangas	Turco	Chachacomani, Cosapata, Turco
	San Pedro de Totora	Totora	Totora	Calazaya, Chojna Cota, Crucero, Culta, Huacanapi, Marquirivi, Totora
	Saucarí	Toledo	Toledo	Catuyo, Challa Cruz, Challavito, Chocorasi, Chuquina, Collpahuma, Culluri, Kari Kari, Saucarí, Toledo, Untavi
	Sebastián Pagador	Santiago de Huari	Santiago de Huari	Belen, Caico Bolivar, Castilla Huma, Condo "C", Condo "K", Guadalupe, Lagunillas, Locumpaya, Santiago de Huari, Urmiri, Vichaj Lupe
	Sud Carangas	Andamarca	Santiago de Andamarca	Santiago de Andamarca, Eduardo Avaroa, Orinoca
	Sud Carangas	Andamarca	Belén de Andamarca	Belén de Andamarca, Cruz Huayllamarca, Real Machacamarca, Calama Andamarca
	Tomas Barrón	Eucaliptus	Eucaliptus	Eucaliptus

=== Pando Department ===
Department	Province	Capital	Municipality	Canton
Pando	5 Provinces	Cobija	15 Municipalities	32 Cantons
	Abuná	Santa Rosa del Abuná	Santa Rosa del Abuná	Nacebe, Teduzara
	Abuná	Santa Rosa del Abuná	Humaita	Ingavi, Tacna (Humaita)
	Federico Román	Nueva Esperanza	Nueva Esperanza	Nueva Esperanza, Río Negro
	Federico Román	Nueva Esperanza	Villa Nueva	Villa Nueva, Perseverancia (Loma Alta)
	Federico Román	Nueva Esperanza	Santos Mercado	Eureka, Mukuripi
	Madre de Dios	Puerto Gonzalo Moreno	Puerto Gonzalo Moreno	Agua Dulce, Trinidad
	Madre de Dios	Puerto Gonzalo Moreno	San Lorenzo	Chorrillos, Exaltacion, Fortaleza
	Madre de Dios	Puerto Gonzalo Moreno	El Sena	Asunción, Bolívar
	Manuripi	Puerto Rico	Puerto Rico	Conquista, El Carmen, Victoria
	Manuripi	Puerto Rico	Filadelfia	Arroyo Grande, San Miguelito, Chive
	Manuripi	Puerto Rico	San Pedro	Maravilla, San Pablo
	Nicolás Suárez	Cobija	Cobija	Santa Cruz de Cobija
	Nicolás Suárez	Cobija	Porvenir	Campo Ana, San Luis
	Nicolás Suárez	Cobija	Bella Flor	Costa Rica, Mercier
	Nicolás Suárez	Cobija	Bolpebra	Chapacura, Mukden

=== Potosí Department ===
Department	Province	Capital	Municipality	Canton
Potosí	16 Provinces	Potosí	38 Municipalities	238 Cantons
	Alonso de Ibáñez	Sacaca	Sacaca	Colloma, Sacaca, Wila Circa
	Alonso de Ibáñez	Sacaca	Caripuyu	Caripuyo, Challviri, Chaicuriri, Chojlla, Cotana, Huanacoma, Jankho Jankho, Juntavi
	Antonio Quijarro	Uyuni	Uyuni	Chacala, Colchani, Coroma, Huanchaca, Pulacayo, Uyuni
	Antonio Quijarro	Uyuni	Tomave	Apacheta, Calasaya, Opoco, San Francisco de Tarana, Tacora, Ticatica, Tolapampa, Tomave, Ubina, Viluyo, Yura
	Antonio Quijarro	Uyuni	Porco	Churcuita, Condoriri, Karma, Porco
	Bernardino Bilbao	Arampampa	Acasio	Acasio, Taconi de Caine
	Bernardino Bilbao	Arampampa	Arampampa	Arampampa, Charca Marcavi, Huaycuri, Humavisa, Pararani, Santiago, Sarcuri, Molle Villque
	Charcas	San Pedro de Buena Vista	San Pedro de Buena Vista	Eskencachi, Micani, Moscari, San Marcos, San Pedro, Toracari
	Charcas	San Pedro de Buena Vista	Toro Toro	Anahuani, Carasi, Julo Grande, Tambo Khasa, Toro Toro, Yambata
	Chayanta	Colquechaca	Colquechaca	Ayoma, Colquechaca, Macha, Rosario, Surumi
	Chayanta	Colquechaca	Ravelo	Antora, Huaycoma, Pitantora, Ravelo, Tomoyo, Toroca
	Chayanta	Colquechaca	Pocoata	Campaya, Chayala, Pocoata, Quesem Phuco, San Juan de Arrospata, San Miguel de Kari, Senajo, Tacarani, Tomuyo
	Chayanta	Colquechaca	Ocurí	Chairapata, Maragua, Marcoma, Ocurí
	Cornelio Saavedra	Betanzos	Betanzos	Betanzos, Millares, Otuyo, Poco Poco, Potobamba, Quivincha, Siporo, Tecoya, Tuero Tuero, Villa El Carmen
	Cornelio Saavedra	Betanzos	Tacobamba	Ancoma, Colaví, Machacamarca, Rodeo Rodeo, Tacobamba, Yawacari
	Cornelio Saavedra	Betanzos	Chaquí	Chaquí, Coipasi
	Daniel Campos	Llica	Llica	Cahuana, Canquella, Chacoma, Llica, Palaya, San Pablo de Napa, Tres Cruces
	Daniel Campos	Llica	Tahua	Ayque, Cacoma, Caquena, Coqueza, Tahua, Yonza
	Enrique Baldivieso	San Agustín	San Agustín	Alota, Cerro Gordo, San Agustín, Todos Santos
	José María Linares	Puna	Puna	Belen, Duraznos, Esquiri, German Busch, Inchasi, Miculpaya, Otavi, Pacasi, Puna, Sepulturas, Turuchipa, Vilacaya
	José María Linares	Puna	Caiza "D"	Caiza "D", Cucho Ingenio, La Lava, Pancoche, Tuctapari
	Modesto Omiste	Villazón	Villazón	Berque, Casira, Chagua, Chipihuayco, Mojo, Moraya, Sagnasti, Salitre, San Pedro de Sococha, Sarcari, Sococha, Villazon, Yuruma
	Nor Chichas	Cotagaita	Cotagaita	Carlos Medinacelli, Cerro Colorado, Chati, Cornaca, Cotagaita, El Manzanal, La Carreta, Laytapi, Pampa Grande, Quechisla, Mormorque, Ramadas, Río Blanco, Sagrario, Toropalca, Tumusla, Valle Hermoso, Vichacla, Villa Concepcion
	Nor Chichas	Cotagaita	Vitichi	Ara, Calcha, Vitichi, Yawisla
	Nor Lípez	Colcha "K"	Colcha "K“	Atulcha, Chuvica, Calcha „K“, Cocani, Colcha „K“, Julaca, Llavica, Rio Grande, San Cristobal, San Juan, Santiago, Santiago de Agencha, Soniquera
	Nor Lípez	Colcha "K"	San Pedro de Quemes	Cana, Chiguana, Pajancha, Pelcoya, San Pedro de Quemes
	Rafael Bustillo	Uncía	Uncía	Uncía, Cala Cala, Chuquiuta
	Rafael Bustillo	Uncía	Llallagua	Llallagua, Jachojo
	Rafael Bustillo	Uncía	Chayanta	Amayapampa, Aymaya, Chayanta, Chiuta Cala Cala, Coataca, Irupata, Nueva Colcha, Panacachi, Río Verde
	Sur Chichas	Tupiza	Tupiza	Chillco, Concepcion, Esmoraca, Oploca, Oro Ingenio, Quiriza, Rufino Carrasco, Soracaya, Suipacha, Talina, Tupiza, Villa Pacheco
	Sur Chichas	Tupiza	Atocha	Atocha, Chocaya, Chorolque Viejo, Guadalupe, Portugalete, San Vicente, Tacmari
	Sur Lípez	San Pablo de Lípez	San Pablo de Lípez	Quetena Grande, San Antonio de Lípez, San Pablo de Lípez
	Sur Lípez	San Pablo de Lípez	San Antonio de Esmoruco	Guadalupe, San Antonio de Esmoruco
	Sur Lípez	San Pablo de Lípez	Mojinete	Bonete Palca, Casa Grande, La Cienega, Mojinete, Pueblo Viejo
	Tomás Frías	Potosí	Potosí	Chulchucani, Huari Huari, Potosí, Tarapaya
	Tomás Frías	Potosí	Tinguipaya	Anthura, Tinguipaya
	Tomás Frías	Potosí	Yocalla	Salinas de Yocalla, Santa Lucia, Yocalla
	Tomás Frías	Potosí	Urmiri	Cahuayo, Urmiri

=== Santa Cruz Department ===
Department	Province	Capital	Municipality	Canton
Santa Cruz	15 Provinces	Santa Cruz	52 Municipalities	147 Cantons
	Andrés Ibáñez	Santa Cruz	Santa Cruz	Santa Cruz, Montero Hoyos, Palmar del Oratorio, Paurito
	Andrés Ibáñez	Santa Cruz	La Guardia	La Guardia, Km.12, El Carmen, Pedro Lorenzo, San José, Peji
	Andrés Ibáñez	Santa Cruz	El Torno	El Torno, Jorochito, La Angostura, Limoncito
	Andrés Ibáñez	Santa Cruz	Cotoca	Cotoca, Puerto Pailas
	Andrés Ibáñez	Santa Cruz	Porongo	Ayacucho, Tervinto
	Ángel Sandoval	San Matías	San Matías	La Gaíba, Las Petas, San Matías, Santo Corazón
	Chiquitos	San José de Chiquitos	San José de Chiquitos	Paso, Quimome, San José, San Juan
	Chiquitos	San José de Chiquitos	Pailón	Canada Larga, Cerro Concepción, Pailón, Pozo del Tigre, Tres Cruces
	Chiquitos	San José de Chiquitos	Roboré	Roboré, Santiago
	Cordillera	Lagunillas	Lagunillas	Lagunillas, Aquio (Ipati)
	Cordillera	Lagunillas	Camiri	Camiri, Choreti
	Cordillera	Lagunillas	Charagua	Charagua, Izozog, Parapeti Grande, Saipuru
	Cordillera	Lagunillas	Cabezas	Abapo, Cabezas, Curiche, El Filo, Florida, Piray
	Cordillera	Lagunillas	Gutierrez	Gutierrez, Ipita
	Cordillera	Lagunillas	Boyuibe	Boyuibe, La Ele
	Cordillera	Lagunillas	Cuevo	Cuevo
	Florida	Samaipata	Samaipata	Samaipata, San Juan del Rosario
	Florida	Samaipata	Pampa Grande	Mataral, Pampa Grande
	Florida	Samaipata	Mairana	Mairana
	Florida	Samaipata	Quirusillas	Quirusillas
	Germán Busch	Puerto Suárez	Puerto Suárez	Puerto Suárez
	Germán Busch	Puerto Suárez	Puerto Quijarro	Puerto Quijarro
	Germán Busch	Puerto Suárez	El Carmen Rivero Torres	El Carmen Rivero Torres
	Guarayos	Ascensión	Ascensión de Guarayos	
	Guarayos	Ascensión	El Puente	
	Guarayos	Ascensión	Urubichá	
	Ichilo	Buena Vista	Yapacani	Yapacani
	Ichilo	Buena Vista	San Carlos	San Carlos
	Ichilo	Buena Vista	Buena Vista	Buena Vista, Sanisidro, San Javier, San Miguel
	Ignacio Warnes	Warnes	Warnes	
	Ignacio Warnes	Warnes	Okinawa Uno	Okinawa Uno, Ignacia Zeballos
	José Miguel de Velasco	San Ignacio de Velasco	San Ignacio	
	José Miguel de Velasco	San Ignacio de Velasco	San Miguel	
	José Miguel de Velasco	San Ignacio de Velasco	San Rafael	
	Manuel María Caballero	Comarapa	Comarapa	
	Manuel María Caballero	Comarapa	Saipina	
	Ñuflo de Chávez	Concepción	Concepcion	
	Ñuflo de Chávez	Concepción	San Ramon	
	Ñuflo de Chávez	Concepción	San Javier	
	Ñuflo de Chávez	Concepción	San Antonio de Lomerio	
	Ñuflo de Chávez	Concepción	San Juliÿn	
	Obispo Santistevan	Montero	Montero	Montero
	Obispo Santistevan	Montero	Mineros	Mineros
	Obispo Santistevan	Montero	General Saavedra	General Saavedra
	Obispo Santistevan	Montero	Puerto Fernández Alonso	Puerto Fernández Alonso, Chané Independencia
	Obispo Santistevan	Montero	San Pedro	
	Sara	Portachuelo	Portachuelo	La Estrella, Portachuelo
	Sara	Portachuelo	Santa Rosa	Palometas, Santa Rosa
	Vallegrande	Vallegrande	Vallegrande	Alto Seco, Chaco, El Bello, Guadalupe, Khasa Monte, Loma Larga, Mankaillpa, Masicuri, Naranjos, Piraymiri, San Juan del Tucumancillo, Santa Ana, Santa Rosita, Sitanos, Temporal, Vallegrande
	Vallegrande	Vallegrande	Moro Moro	Abra el Astillero, Añapancu, Ariruma, La Laja, Moro Moro
	Vallegrande	Vallegrande	Pucará	Pucará, La Higuera
	Vallegrande	Vallegrande	Postrer Valle	Postrer Valle, San Juan de la Ladera, Tierras Nuevas
	Vallegrande	Vallegrande	Trigal	Aguada, Lagunillas, Muyurina, Trigal

=== Tarija Department ===
Department	Province	Capital	Municipality	Canton
Tarija	6 Provinces	Tarija	11 Municipalities	79 Cantons
	Aniceto Arce	Padcaya	Padcaya	Camacho, Cañas, Chaguaya, La Merced, Mecoya, Orozas, Padcaya, Rejara, Rosillas, San Francisco, Tacuara, Tariquia
	Aniceto Arce	Padcaya	Bermejo	Arrozales, Bermejo, Candaditos, Porcelana
	Burnet O'Connor	Entre Ríos	Entre Ríos	Chimeo, Chiquiaca, Entre Ríos, Huayco, Ipaguazu, La Cueva, Narvaez, Salinas, San Diego, Suaruro, Tapurayo
	Cercado	Tarija	Tarija	Alto España, Junacas, Lazareto, San Agustín, San Mateo, Santa Ana, Tarija, Tolomosa, Yesera
	Eustaquio Méndez	San Lorenzo	San Lorenzo	Cajas, Calama, El Rancho, Erquis, La Victoria, Leon Cancha, San Lorencito, San Lorenzo, San Pedro de las Peñas, Sella Mendez, Tomatas, Tomatas Grande
	Eustaquio Méndez	San Lorenzo	El Puente	Carrizal, Chayaza, Curqui, El Puente, Huarmachi, Ircalaya, Iscayachi, Paicho, Tomayapo
	Gran Chaco	Yacuíba	Yacuíba	Aguayrenda, Caiza, Yacuíba
	Gran Chaco	Yacuíba	Villamontes	Villamontes
	Gran Chaco	Yacuíba	Caraparí	Caraparí, Itau, Saladillo, Zapatero
	José María Avilés	Uriondo	Uriondo	Chocloca, Juntas, Uriondo
	José María Avilés	Uriondo	Yunchará	Arteza, Belen, Buena Vista, Churquis, Copacabana, Palqui, Noquera, San Pedro, Santa Cruz de Azloca, Tojo, Yunchará
