= Villa Bella =

- Location in Bolivia
- Coordinates: 10°23′37″S 65°23′27″W
- Country: Bolivia
- Department: Beni Department
- Province: Vaca Díez Province
- Municipality: Guayaramerín Municipality
- Canton: Villa Bella Canton

Population (2012)
  - Total: 200
- Time zone: UTC-4 (BOT)

Villa Bella is a village in the Vaca Díez Province, in the Beni Department of Bolivia.
