= Santa Rosa del Abuná =

Coordinates: 10°36′S 67°25′W

- Town
- Interactive map of Santa Rosa del Abuná
- Country: Bolivia
- Department: Pando Department
- Province: Abuná Province
- Municipality: Santa Rosa del Abuná Municipality

Population (2012)
  - Total: 232
- Time zone: UTC-4 (BOT)

Santa Rosa del Abuná is a small town in Pando Department, Bolivia. It is the capital of the department's Abuná Province. It has a population of 232 in 2012.
