= Cladonia vescula =

Scientific classification
- Domain: Eukaryota
- Kingdom: Fungi
- Division: Ascomycota
- Class: Lecanoromycetes
- Order: Lecanorales
- Family: Cladoniaceae
- Genus: Cladonia
- Species: C. vescula

Binomial name
- Cladonia vescula Ahti, Kukwa & Flakus (2016)

Species of lichen

Cladonia vescula is a species of fruticose lichen in the family Cladoniaceae. It is known for its small size and unique chemical composition. It can be found in the montane cloud forests and pre-Andean Amazonian forests of Bolivia and Peru, where it grows on mineral soil mixed with humus. This species closely resembles Cladonia peziziformis and Cladonia corymbosula in morphology, but it is more slender and almost entirely lacking a cortex.

== Taxonomy ==
Cladonia vescula was first formally described by lichenologists Teuvo Ahti, Martin Kukwa, and Adam Flakus in a 2016 scientific study. The type specimen was collected near Consata village (Larecaja Province, La Paz, Bolivia) at an altitude of 1,240 m (4,070 ft). Molecular analyses have supported the specific status of this species. It is part of the genus Cladonia and appears together with Cladonia signata in a rather isolated clade within the supergroup Cladonia. The species epithet vescula is derived from the Latin word vesculus ("poor" or "thin"), referring to the small size of the lichen.

== Description ==
This lichen species is characterized by its small size, with primary thalli consisting of small, esorediate squamules measuring 0.4–2.5 by 0.3–1.0 mm. The podetia, which are 3–13 mm tall, are slender and often clavate, with a surface that is almost completely ecorticate. The hymenial discs are sessile on the podetial tips, ranging from dark to pale brown in colour. Cladonia vescula has two chemotypes, with the first one containing homosekikaic acid, sekikaic acid, and fumarprotocetraric acid, and the second one containing only fumarprotocetraric acid.

== Habitat and distribution ==
Cladonia vescula is known to exist only in Bolivia and Peru. It can be found in Yungas montane cloud forests and pre-Andean Amazonian forests, where it grows on mineral soil mixed with humus.

== See also ==
- List of Cladonia species
