= Federico Román Province =

Province in Bolivia

Provincia Federico Román
- Province
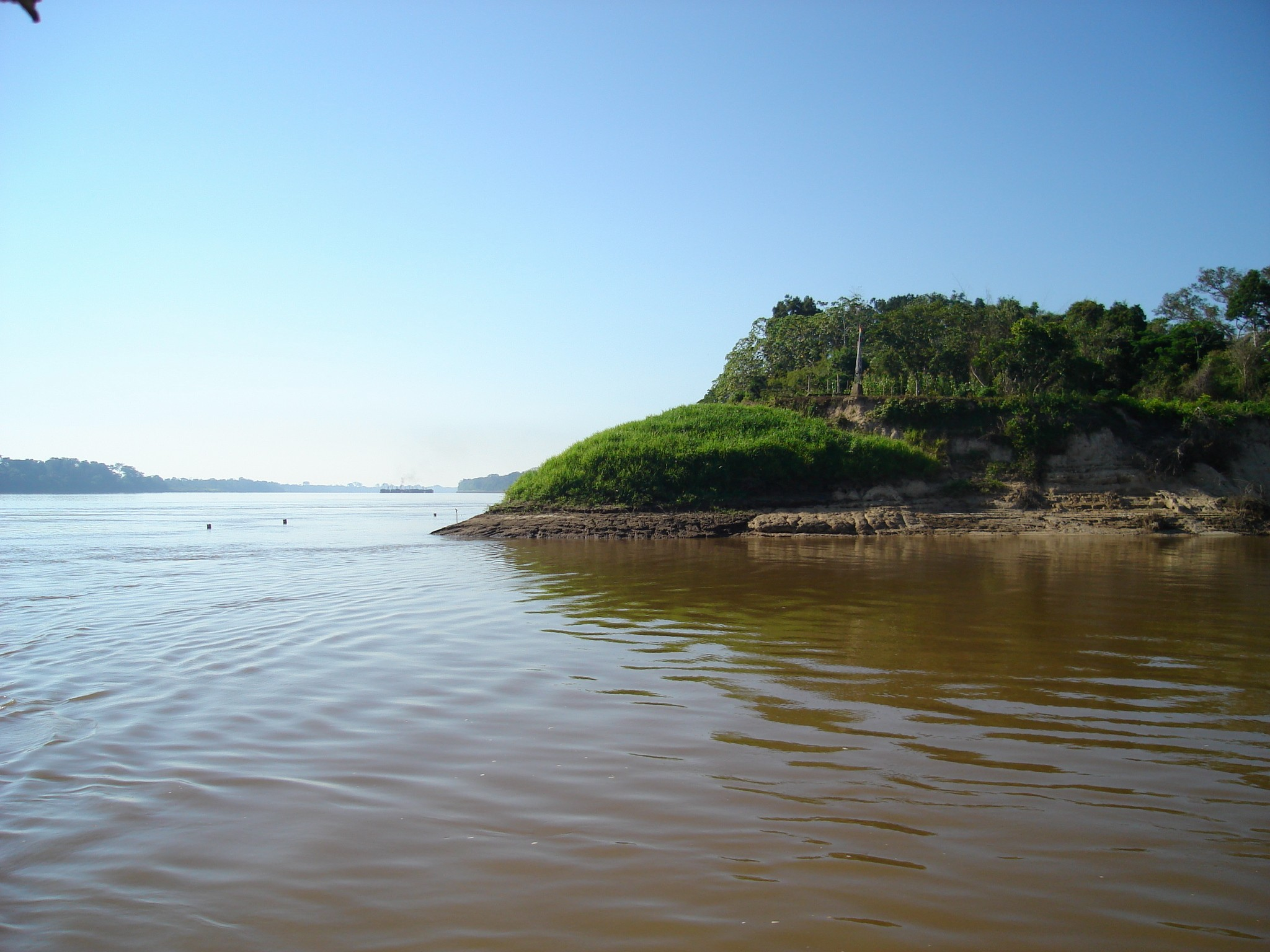
- Río Abuná (right) and Río Madeira (left)
- Interactive map of Provincia Federico Román
- Coordinates: 10°20′S 66°00′W
- Country: Bolivia
- Department: Pando

Area
  - Total: 13,200 km^{2} (5,100 sq mi)

Population (2012)
  - Total: 7,034
  - Density: 0.533/km^{2} (1.38/sq mi)
- ISO 3166 code: BO.PA.GR

Federico Román (or: General Federico Román) is one of the five provinces of the Bolivian department of Pando and is situated in the department's northeastern parts. Its name honours General Federico Román. Its capital is Nueva Esperanza.

== Location ==
Federico Román province is located between 09° 41' and 10° 51' South and between 65° 17' and 66° 39' West. It extends over 150 km from North to South, and 200 km from West to East.

The province is situated in the Amazon lowlands of Bolivia and borders Abuná Province in the West, Manuripi Province in the Southwest, Beni Department in the Southeast, and Brazil in the East and North.

The border to Beni Department in the South forms Río Beni, to neighbouring Brazil Río Madeira in the East and Río Abuná in the North.

== Population ==
The population of Federico Román Province has increased by more than 400% over the recent two decades:

- 1992: 1,516 inhabitants (census)
- 2001: 2,242 inhabitants (census)
- 2012: 7,034 inhabitants (census)

In 1992, 39.6% of the population were younger than 15 years old. 87.9% of the population spoke Spanish, 3.1% Quechua, 1.2% Aymara, and 26.5% a foreign language (mainly Portuguese, due to the nearness to Brazil). The literacy rate of the province's population was 72.6%, and 83.1% of the population were Catholics and 15.2% were Protestants. 83.1% of the population had no access to electricity and 59.1% had no sanitary facilities.

== Division ==
The province comprises three municipios:

- 09-0501 Nueva Esperanza Municipality - 2,068 inhabitants (census 2012)
- 09-0502 Villa Nueva Municipality - 3,275 inhabitants
- 09-0503 Santos Mercado Municipality - 1,691 inhabitants
