= Administrative divisions of Bolivia =

Bolivia is divided into:

- 9 departments (departamentos)
  - 112 provinces (provincias)
    - 339 municipalities (municipios)
      - 1374 cantons (cantones)
