= Abuná =

Abuná can refer to:

- Abuna River, river between Bolivia and Brazil
- Abuná Province, Bolivia

== See also ==
- Abuna, title of bishop in Ethiopian Orthodox Church
