= Madre de Dios Province =

Province in Bolivia

Provincia Madre de Dios
- Province
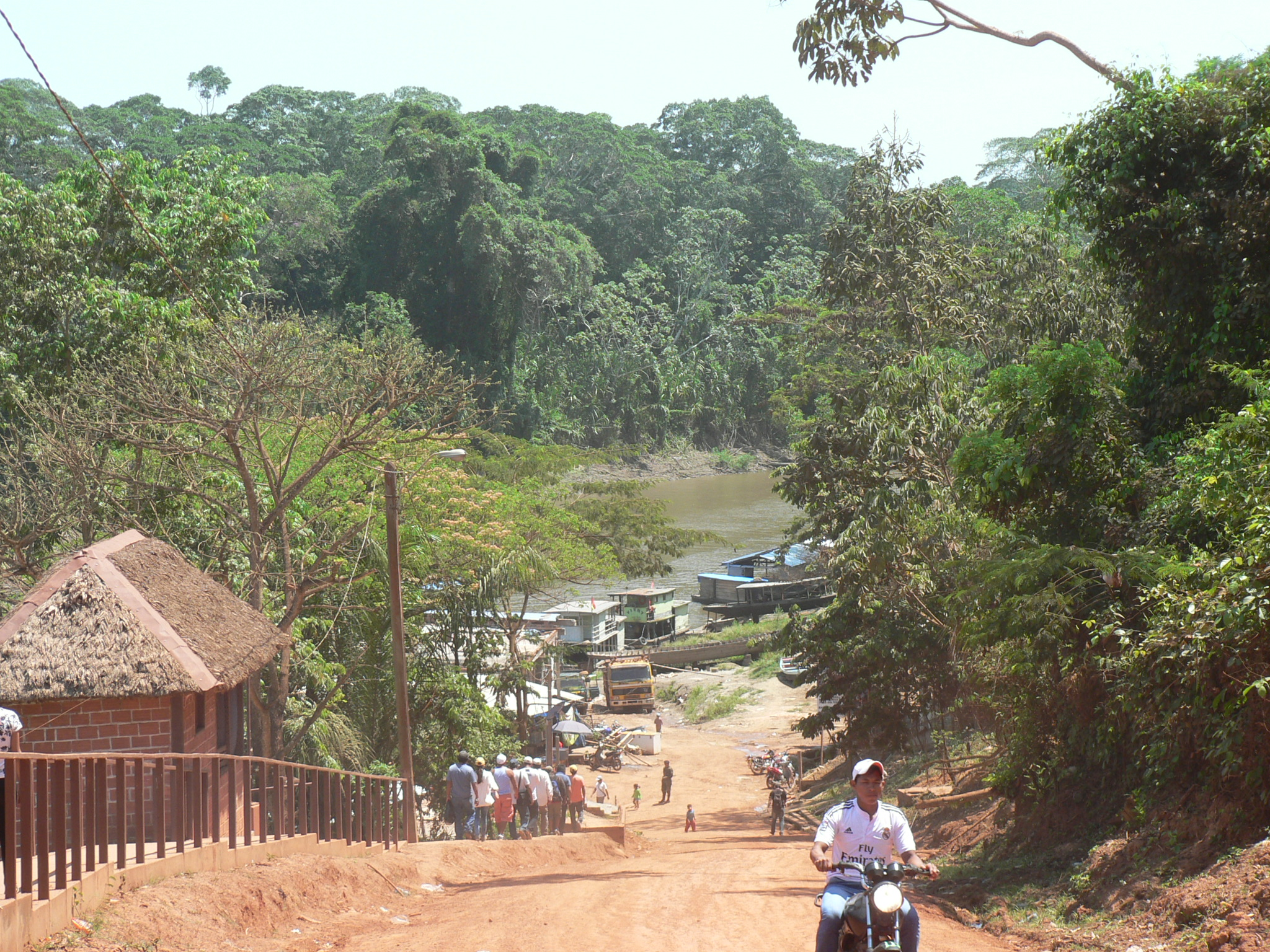
- A view of El Sena, Madre de Dios Province
- Interactive map of Provincia Madre de Dios
- Coordinates: 11°50′S 67°10′W
- Country: Bolivia
- Department: Pando

Area
  - Total: 10,879 km^{2} (4,200 sq mi)

Population (2024)
  - Total: 31,473
  - Density: 2.8930/km^{2} (7.4928/sq mi)
- ISO 3166 code: BO.PA.MD

Madre de Dios (Spanish pronunciation: [ˈmaðɾe ðe ðjos]) is one of the five provinces of the Bolivian Pando department and is situated in the southern parts of the department. Its name derives from Madre de Dios River on the northern border of the province. Its capital is Puerto Gonzalo Moreno.

== Location ==
Madre de Dios province is located between 10° 54' and 12° 28' South and between 66° 05' and 67° 58' West. It extends over a length of 390 km from northeast to southwest, and up to 150 km from northwest to southeast.

It is situated in the Amazon lowlands of Bolivia and borders Manuripi Province in the north, La Paz Department in the southwest, and Beni Department in the southeast.

== Population ==
The population of Federico Román Province has increased by 50% over the recent two decades:

- 1992: 8,097 inhabitants (census)
- 2001: 9,521 inhabitants (census)
- 2005: 11,220 inhabitants (est.)
- 2024: 31,473 inhabitants (census)

In 1992, 99.3% of the population spoke Spanish, 0.7% spoke Quechua, 0.1% spoke Aymara, and 5.6 spoke other indigenous languages. The literacy rate of the province's population was 82.4% and 49.8% of the population were younger than 15 years old. 94.7% of the population had no access to electricity and 71.8% had no sanitary facilities. 80.2% of the population were Catholics and 18.8% were Protestants.

== Division ==
The province comprises three municipios:

- Puerto Gonzalo Moreno Municipality – 4,714 inhabitants (2005)
- San Lorenzo Municipality – 4.018 inhabitants
- El Sena Municipality – 2.488 inhabitants

== Places of interest ==
- Manuripi-Heath Amazonian Wildlife National Reserve
