= Nicolás Suárez Province =

Province in Bolivia

Provincia Nicolás Suárez
- Province
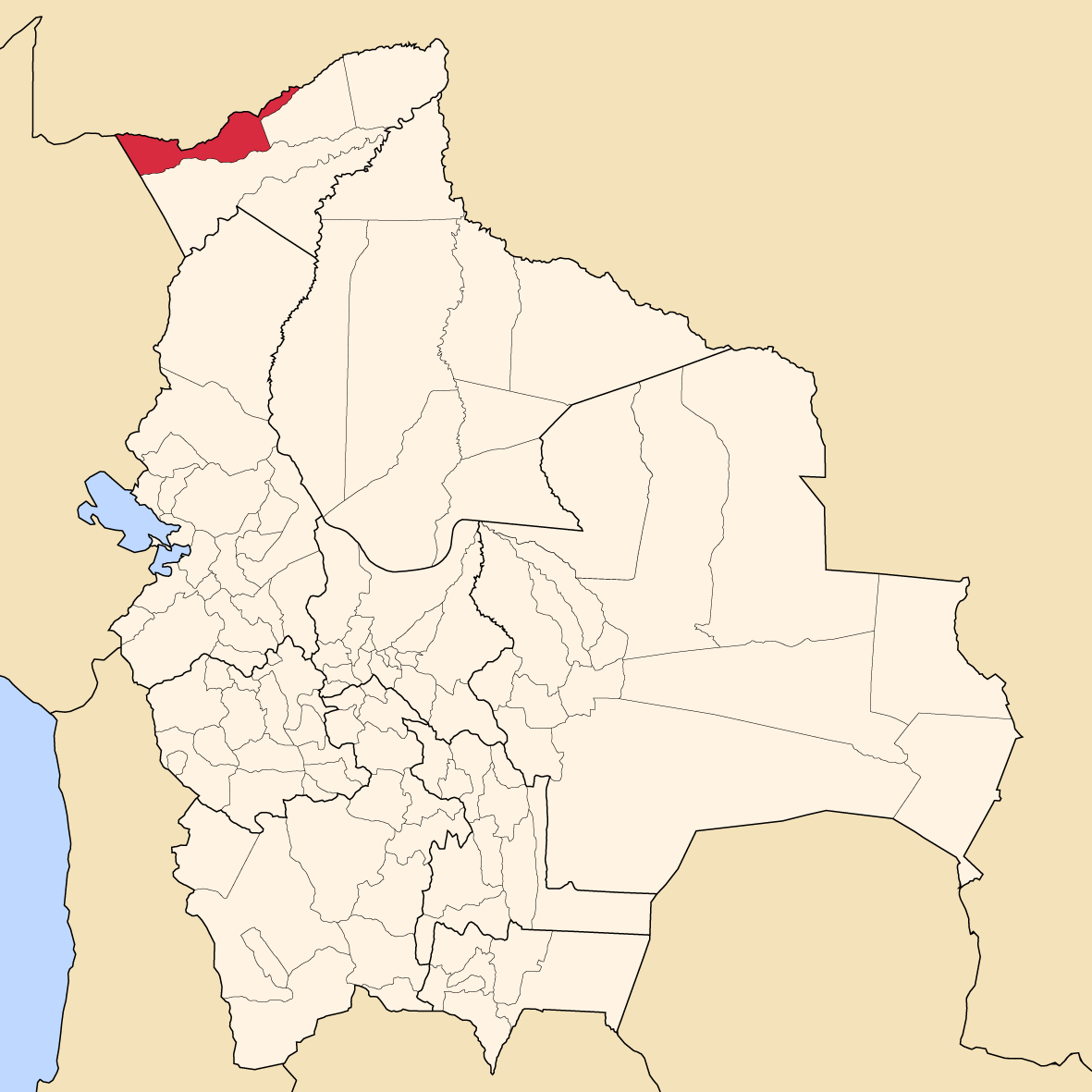
- Interactive map of Provincia Nicolás Suárez
- Coordinates: 11°05′S 68°10′W
- Country: Bolivia
- Department: Pando

Area
  - Total: 9,819 km^{2} (3,791 sq mi)

Population (2024)
  - Total: 69,378
  - Density: 7.066/km^{2} (18.30/sq mi)
- ISO 3166 code: BO.PA.NS

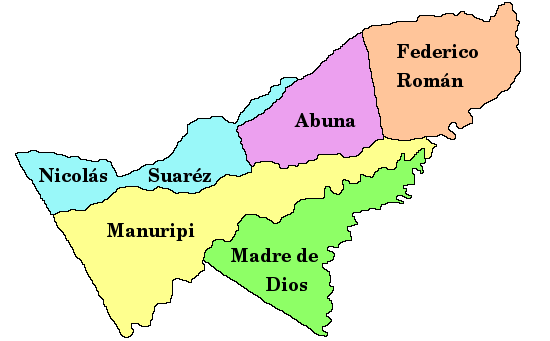

Nicolás Suárez is one of the five provinces of the Bolivian Pando department and is situated in the department's northwestern parts. Its name honors Nicolás Suárez Callaú (1861-1940) who owned major parts of today's Pando and Beni Departments in the times of the caoutchouc-boom. Its capital is Cobija.

== Location ==
Nicolás Suárez Province is located between 10° 39' and 11° 27' South and between 67° 33' and 69° 34' West. It extends over a length of 370 km from Northeast to Southwest, and up to 100 km from North to South.

The province is situated in the Amazon lowlands of Bolivia and borders Brazil in the North, Peru in the West, Manuripi Province in the South, and Abuná Province in the East.

== Population ==
The population of Nicolás Suárez Province has increased by almost 200% over the recent two decades:

- 1992: 18,447 inhabitants (census)
- 2001: 29,536 inhabitants (census)
- 2005: 39,577 inhabitants (est.)
- 2010: 51,377 inhabitants (est.)
- 2024: 69,378 inhabitants (census)

In 1992, 42.4% of the population were younger than 15 years old. 84.7% of the population spoke Spanish, 4.9% spoke Quechua, and 3.1% spoke Aymara. 83.9% of the population were Catholics and 13.8% were Protestants. Additionally, 51.9% of the population had no access to electricity, while 33.0% had no sanitary facilities. In 2012, the literacy rate of the province's population was 98.3%.

== Division ==
The province comprises four municipalities:

- Bella Flor Municipality - 2,305 inhabitants (2001)
- Bolpebra Municipality - 1,194 inhabitants
- Cobija Municipality - 22,324 inhabitants
- Porvenir Municipality - 3,713 inhabitants

== See also ==
- Porvenir Massacre
