= Manuripi Province =

Province in Pando Department, Bolivia

Provincia Manuripi
- Province
- Interactive map of Provincia Manuripi
- Coordinates: 11°40′S 68°20′W
- Country: Bolivia
- Department: Pando

Area
  - Total: 22,461 km^{2} (8,672 sq mi)

Population (2024)
  - Total: 18,397
  - Density: 0.81906/km^{2} (2.1214/sq mi)
- ISO 3166 code: BO.PA.MN

Manuripi is one of the five provinces of Pando Department in Bolivia and is situated in the northwest of the department. Its name is derived from the Manuripi River, which passes through the province from west to east. Its capital is Puerto Rico.

== Location ==
Manuripi province is located between 10° 49’ and 12° 30' South and between 66° 00' and 69° 14' West. It extends over a length of 370 km from Northeast to Southwest, and up to 100 km from Northwest to Southeast.

The province is situated in the Amazon lowlands of Bolivia and borders Abuná Province in the North, Nicolás Suárez Province in the Northwest, Peru in the West, La Paz Department in the South, Madre de Dios Province in the Southeast, Beni Department in the East, and Federico Román Province in the Northeast.

== Population ==
The population of Federico Román Province has increased by 40% over the last two decades:

- 1992: 7,360 inhabitants (census)
- 2001: 8,230 inhabitants (census)
- 2005: 9,505 inhabitants (est.)
- 2010: 10,164 inhabitants (est.)

At the 1992 census, 98.0% of the population spoke Spanish, 0.4% spoke Quechua, and 0.2% spoke Aymara. The literacy rate of the province's population was 75.4% and 47.7% of the population was younger than 15 years old. 84.4% of the population were Catholics and 14.6% were Protestants. 91.0% of the population had no access to electricity and 68.5% had no sanitary facilities.

== Division ==
The province comprises three municipalities:

- Filadelfia Municipality – 3,145 inhabitants (2005)
- Puerto Rico Municipality – 4,003 inhabitants
- San Pedro Municipality – 1,082 inhabitants

== Places of interest ==
- Manuripi-Heath Amazonian Wildlife National Reserve
