= Amarete =

- Town
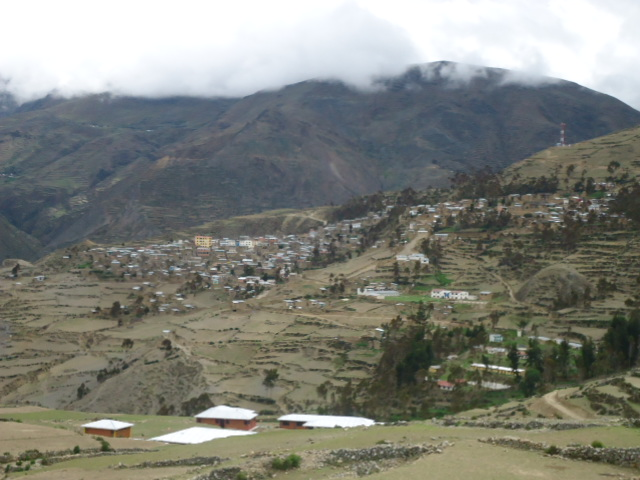

- Location within Bolivia
- Coordinates: 15°14′S 68°59′W
- Country: Bolivia
- Department: La Paz Department
- Province: Bautista Saavedra Province
- Municipality: Charazani Municipality

Population (2001)
  - Total: 1,741
- Time zone: UTC-4 (BOT)

Amarete is a small town in Bolivia. In 2010 it had an estimated population of 2,203.
