= Colchani, Potosí =

Colchani
- Town
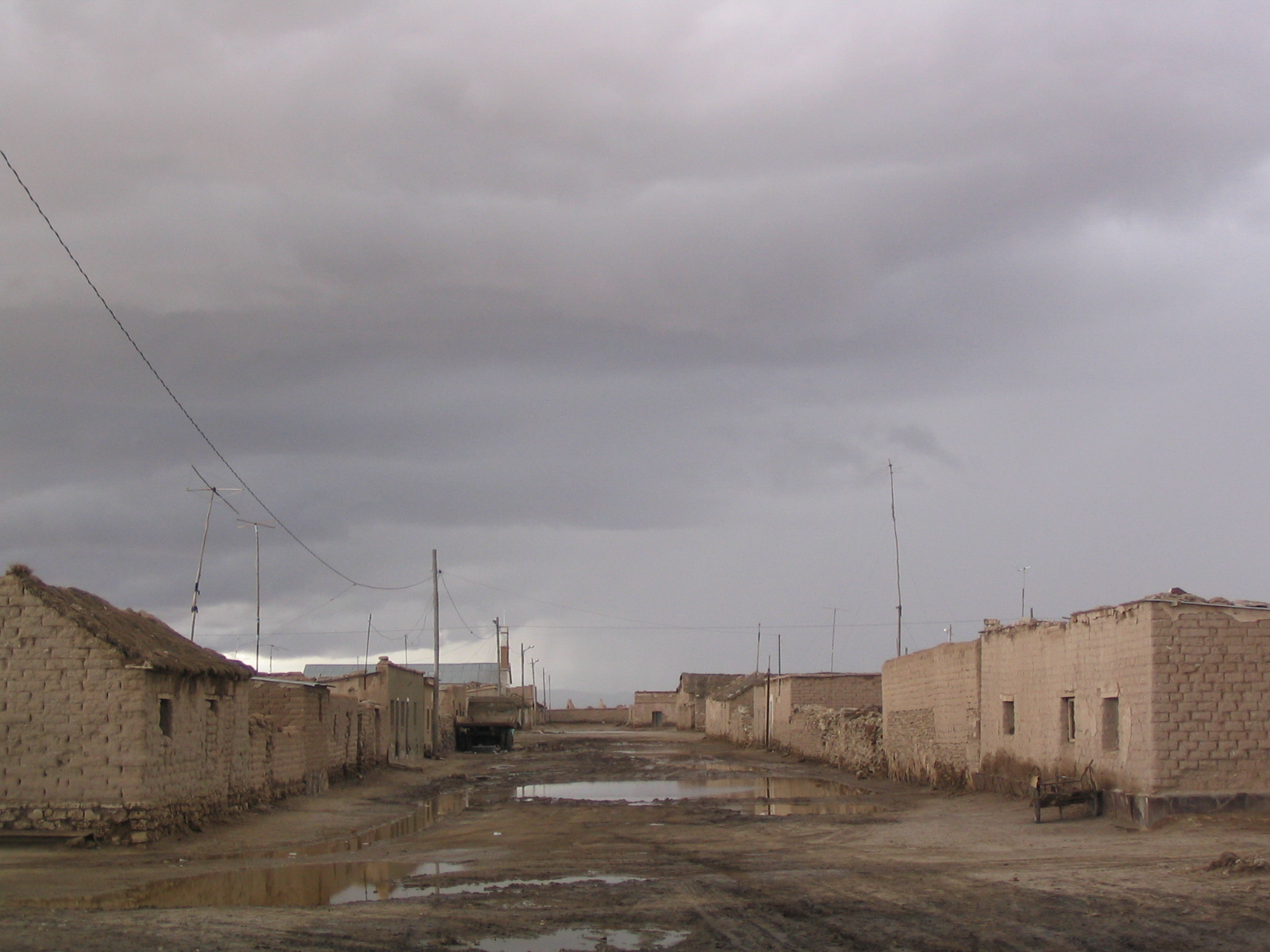

- Location within Bolivia
- Coordinates: 20.3006°S 66.9378°W
- Country: Bolivia
- Department: Potosí Department
- Province: Antonio Quijarro Province
- Municipality: Uyuni Municipality

Population (2001)
  - Total: 528
- Time zone: UTC-4 (BST)

Colchani (Potosí) is a small town in the municipality of Uyuni in Bolivia. In 2009 it had an estimated population of 611.
