= Tomas Barrón Province =

Province in Northern Oruro, Bolivia

Provincia Tomás Barrón
- Province
- Interactive map of Provincia Tomás Barrón
- Coordinates: 17°37′S 67°27′W
- Country: Bolivia
- Department: Oruro

Area
  - Total: 341 km^{2} (132 sq mi)

Dimensions
  - Length: 30 km (19 mi)
  - Width: 25 km (16 mi)

Population (2024)
  - Total: 5,443
  - Density: 16.0/km^{2} (41.3/sq mi)
- ISO 3166 code: BO.OR.TB

Tomás Barrón is a province in the northern parts of the Bolivian department of Oruro. Its capital is Eucaliptus.

== Location ==
Tomás Barrón province is one of the sixteen provinces in the Oruro Department. It is located between 17° 31' and 17° 44' South and between 67° 20' and 67° 34' West. It has been named after Colonel Tomas Barrón.

The province borders La Paz Department in the North and West, and Cercado Province in the South and East.

The province extends over 30 kilometres (19 mi) from North to South, and 25 kilometres (16 mi) from East to West.

== Population ==
The population increased from 5,045 inhabitants (1992 census) to 5,424 (2001 census), an increase of 7.5%.

At the 1992 census, the main language of the province was Spanish, spoken by 87%, while 82% of the population spoke Aymara and 8% Quechua. 48% of the population are younger was 15 years old. 66% of the population was Catholics and 27% were Protestants. 26% of the population had no access to electricity and 95% had no sanitary facilities.

At the 2001 census, 49% of the population were employed in agriculture, 1% in mining, 11% in industry, and 39% in general services.

== Division ==
The province comprises only one municipality, Eucaliptus Municipality, which is identical to the Tomás Barrón Province.
