= Puerto Aroma =

Coordinates: 17.4436°S 68.1314°W

- Town
- Interactive map of Puerto Aroma
- Country: Bolivia
- Time zone: UTC-4 (BOT)

Puerto Aroma is a small town in Bolivia.
