= San Lucas, Bolivia =

San Lucas
- Town
- Flag

- Location within Bolivia
- Coordinates: 20°06′S 65°08′W
- Country: Bolivia
- Department: Chuquisaca Department
- Province: Nor Cinti Province
- Municipality: San Lucas Municipality
- Elevation: 9,997 ft (3,047 m)

Population (2012)
  - Total: 1,941
- Time zone: UTC−04:00 (BOT)

San Lucas is a town in the Chuquisaca Department of Bolivia.

== Climate ==
Climate data for San Lucas, elevation 3,055 m (10,023 ft), (1974–2015)
Month	Jan	Feb	Mar	Apr	May	Jun	Jul	Aug	Sep	Oct	Nov	Dec	Year
Mean daily maximum °C (°F)	24.1 (75.4)	24.5 (76.1)	25.1 (77.2)	25.8 (78.4)	24.9 (76.8)	23.9 (75.0)	23.6 (74.5)	24.7 (76.5)	24.8 (76.6)	26.1 (79.0)	25.8 (78.4)	25.3 (77.5)	24.9 (76.8)
Daily mean °C (°F)	17.5 (63.5)	17.6 (63.7)	17.7 (63.9)	17.0 (62.6)	13.8 (56.8)	11.4 (52.5)	11.5 (52.7)	13.2 (55.8)	15.2 (59.4)	17.5 (63.5)	18.2 (64.8)	18.2 (64.8)	15.7 (60.3)
Mean daily minimum °C (°F)	11.1 (52.0)	10.8 (51.4)	10.4 (50.7)	8.4 (47.1)	2.9 (37.2)	−0.9 (30.4)	−0.6 (30.9)	1.9 (35.4)	5.8 (42.4)	9.0 (48.2)	10.6 (51.1)	11.2 (52.2)	6.7 (44.1)
Average precipitation mm (inches)	109.8 (4.32)	94.9 (3.74)	74.3 (2.93)	19.6 (0.77)	1.0 (0.04)	0.6 (0.02)	1.5 (0.06)	4.2 (0.17)	11.3 (0.44)	30.5 (1.20)	49.4 (1.94)	87.8 (3.46)	484.9 (19.09)
Average precipitation days	13.0	9.9	8.2	2.8	0.3	0.2	0.3	0.8	1.8	4.2	5.8	9.6	56.9
Average relative humidity (%)	66.4	66.7	64.4	59.2	52.8	51.6	52.1	50.9	53.1	53.7	59.0	62.3	57.7
Source: Servicio Nacional de Meteorología e Hidrología de Bolivia
