= Calcha "K" =

- Interactive map of Calcha "K"
- Coordinates: 21°02′37″S 67°32′07″W
- Country: Bolivia
- Department: Potosí
- Province: Provinz Nor Lípez
- Elevation: 3,697 m (12,129 ft)

Population (Census 2001)
  - Total: 510
- Postal code: 05-0901-1300-1001
- Area code: (+591)

Calcha "K" is a locality in the Potosí Department in the highlands of the South American Andean state of Bolivia.

== Location ==
Calcha "K" is the central place of the Kanton Calcha "K" and is located in the Municipio Colcha "K" in the Nor Lípez Province at an elevation of 3,697 m (12,129 ft), thirty kilometers south of the salt lake Salar de Uyuni.

== Geography ==
Calcha "K" is situated on the Bolivian Altiplano between the Andean mountain ranges of the Cordillera Occidental in the west and the Cordillera de Lípez in the southeast. The region's climate is a typical Tageszeitenklima, where the fluctuation of daily temperatures is more significant than the average seasonal variation of temperatures.

The annual average temperature of the region is about 8 °C (46 °F), with monthly average temperatures fluctuating slightly between 4 °C (39 °F) in July and 10 °C (50 °F) in December (see climate diagram Colcha "K"). The annual precipitation is just under 100 mm (3.9 in), with notable monthly precipitation of a few centimeters only occurring from December to March; the rest of the year is almost precipitation-free.

According to the climate classification, the climate of Calcha "K" is dry and cold (BWk).

== Transportation ==
Calcha "K" is located 340 road kilometers southwest of Potosí, the capital of the same-named department.

From Potosí, the paved National Road Ruta 5 leads southwest for 198 kilometers to Uyuni, from there the partially unpaved Ruta 701 continues southwest and reaches the bridge over the Río Grande de Uyuni after 61 kilometers. Behind the bridge, a country road branches off northwest and reaches Julaca after 66 kilometers along the railway line. From there, an unpaved country road leads northwest, reaching Calcha "K" after another 15 kilometers.

== Population ==
The population of the locality has increased by about a third in the last decade of the 20th century:

Year	Population	Source
1992	365	Census
2001	510	Census

During the 2012 census, both the Kanton Calcha "K" and the locality of Calcha "K" were not listed in the statistics, and it remains to be seen if both will be noted in the upcoming 2024 census.
