= Exaltación Municipality =

Coordinates: 13°S 65.8333°W

- Municipality
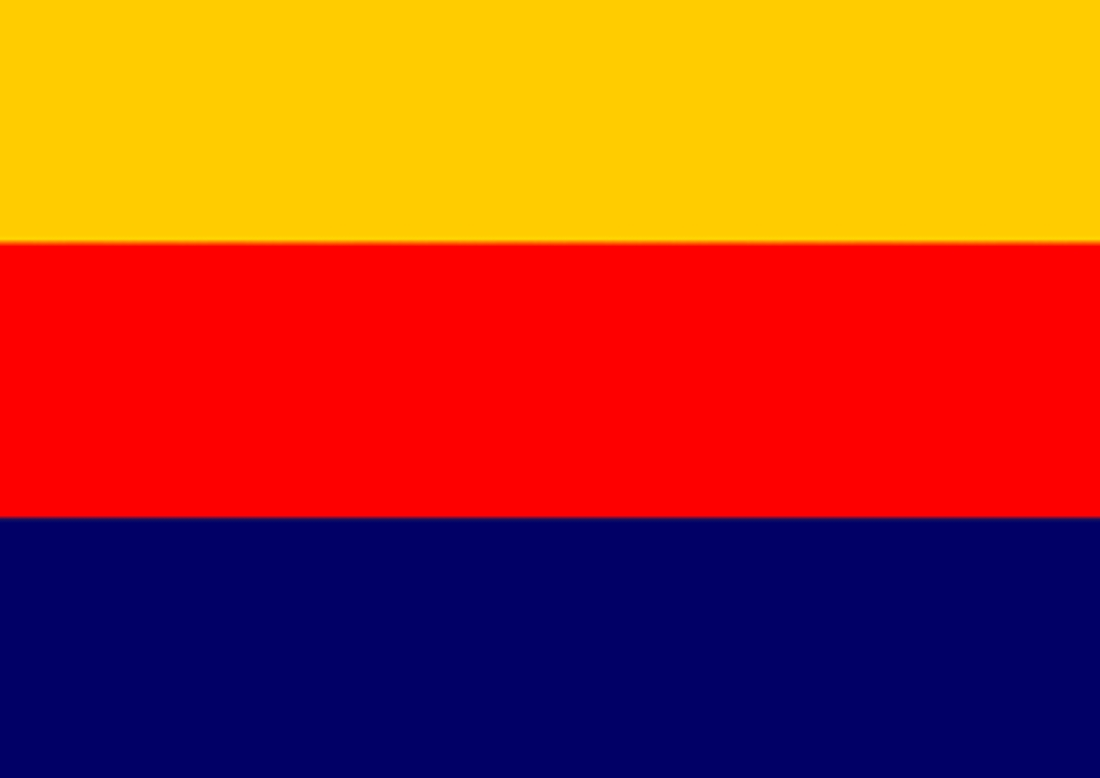
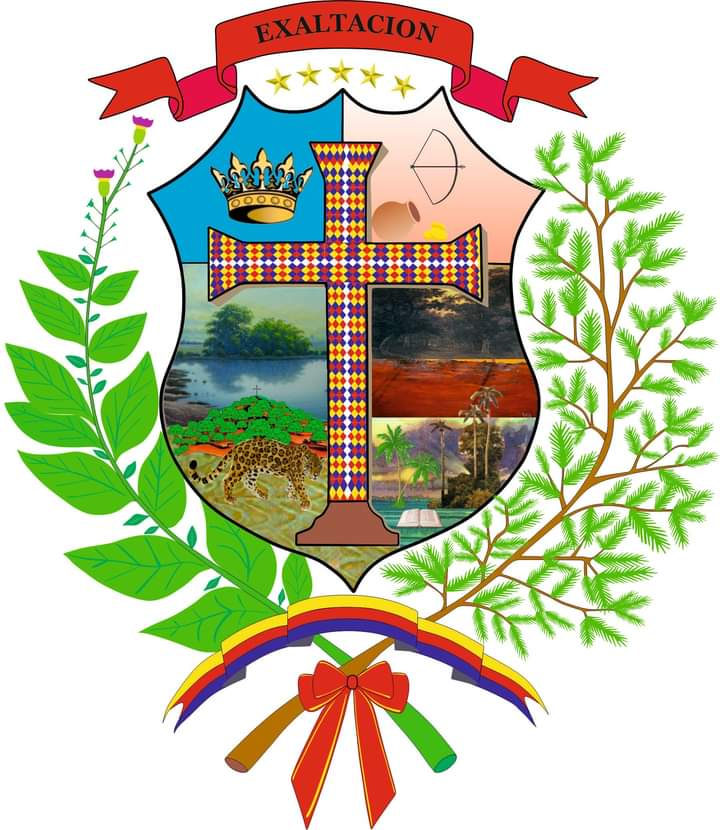
- Flag Coat of arms
- Interactive map of Exaltación Municipality
- Country: Bolivia
- Department: Beni Department
- Province: Yacuma Province

Population (2010)
  - Total: 13,181
- Time zone: UTC-4 (BOT)

Exaltación Municipality is a municipality of the Beni Department, Bolivia.
