= Uriondo =

Coordinates: 21°41′44″S 64°39′11″W

Uriondo is a town in the Bolivian Tarija Department.

Uriondo is the administrative center of José María Avilés Province and is located at an elevation of 1,709 m on the confluence of Río Rochero and Río Camacho, 25 km south of Tarija, the department capital.

Uriondo has a population of circa 2,500 inhabitants.

== Climate ==
Climate data for Chocloca, elevation 1,795 m (5,889 ft), (1975–2010)
Month	Jan	Feb	Mar	Apr	May	Jun	Jul	Aug	Sep	Oct	Nov	Dec	Year
Mean daily maximum °C (°F)	27.2 (81.0)	26.8 (80.2)	25.9 (78.6)	25.5 (77.9)	24.2 (75.6)	25.1 (77.2)	24.0 (75.2)	25.5 (77.9)	25.6 (78.1)	26.9 (80.4)	26.7 (80.1)	27.1 (80.8)	25.9 (78.6)
Daily mean °C (°F)	21.1 (70.0)	20.5 (68.9)	19.8 (67.6)	18.1 (64.6)	15.2 (59.4)	13.7 (56.7)	13.1 (55.6)	15.0 (59.0)	16.5 (61.7)	19.3 (66.7)	20.2 (68.4)	20.8 (69.4)	17.8 (64.0)
Mean daily minimum °C (°F)	14.9 (58.8)	14.1 (57.4)	13.7 (56.7)	10.8 (51.4)	6.1 (43.0)	2.3 (36.1)	2.1 (35.8)	4.4 (39.9)	7.3 (45.1)	11.6 (52.9)	13.6 (56.5)	14.6 (58.3)	9.6 (49.3)
Average precipitation mm (inches)	137.1 (5.40)	109.5 (4.31)	107.6 (4.24)	29.2 (1.15)	4.2 (0.17)	1.2 (0.05)	1.3 (0.05)	4.6 (0.18)	13.4 (0.53)	51.0 (2.01)	83.5 (3.29)	117.6 (4.63)	660.2 (26.01)
Average precipitation days	11.4	9.8	10.1	4.0	1.2	0.4	0.4	0.9	2.1	5.5	8.4	10.2	64.4
Average relative humidity (%)	71.4	75.5	75.9	72.0	67.6	60.9	60.9	61.7	60.6	65.6	68.2	70.9	67.6
Source: Servicio Nacional de Meteorología e Hidrología de Bolivia
