= Totora, Oruro =

Coordinates: 17.7928°S 68.145°W

Totora T'utura
- Town
- Interactive map of Totora
- Country: Bolivia
- Time zone: UTC-4 (BOT)

Totora, Oruro is a small town in Bolivia.
