= Puerto Siles Municipality =

Coordinates: 12.3333°S 65°W

- Municipality
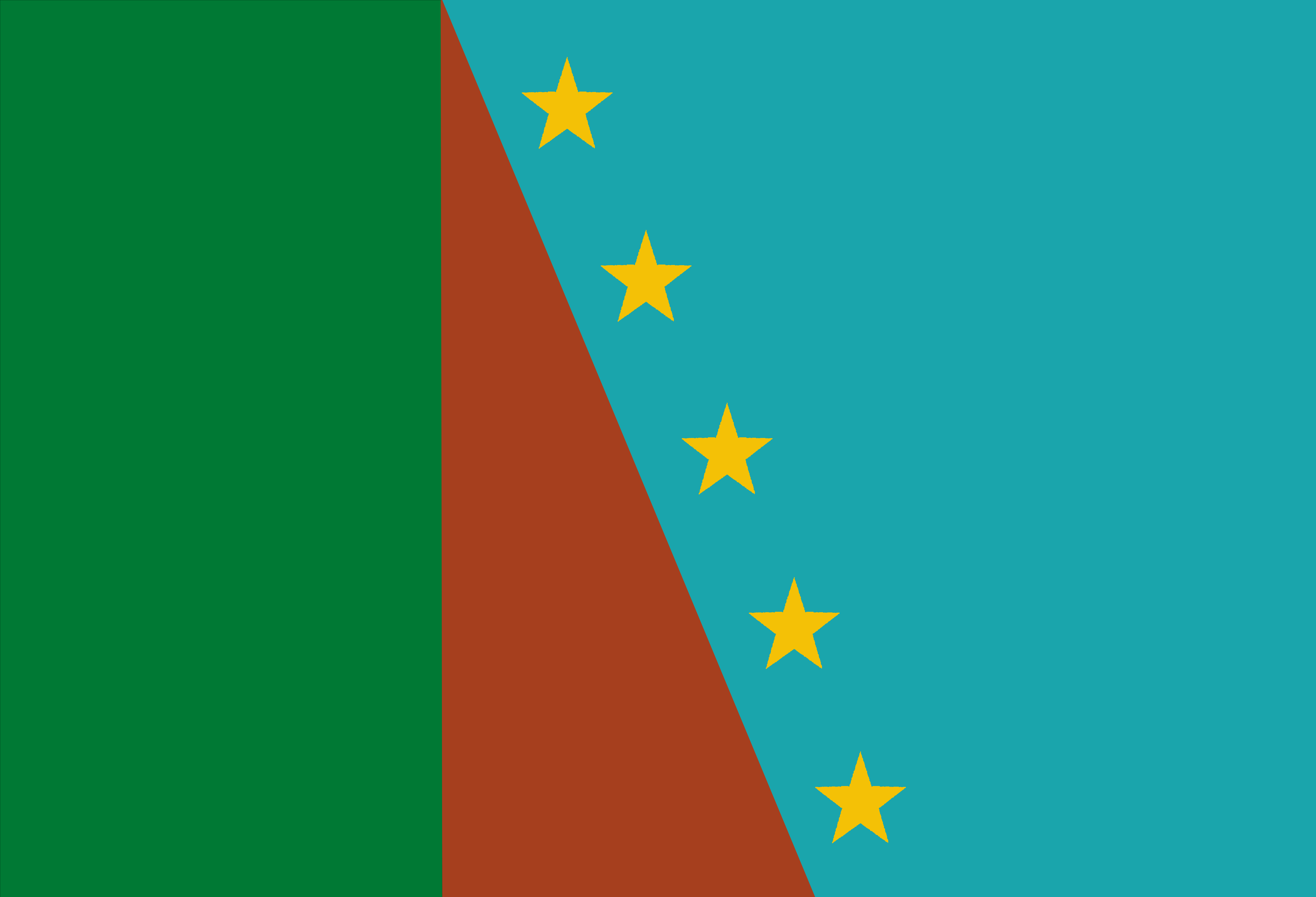
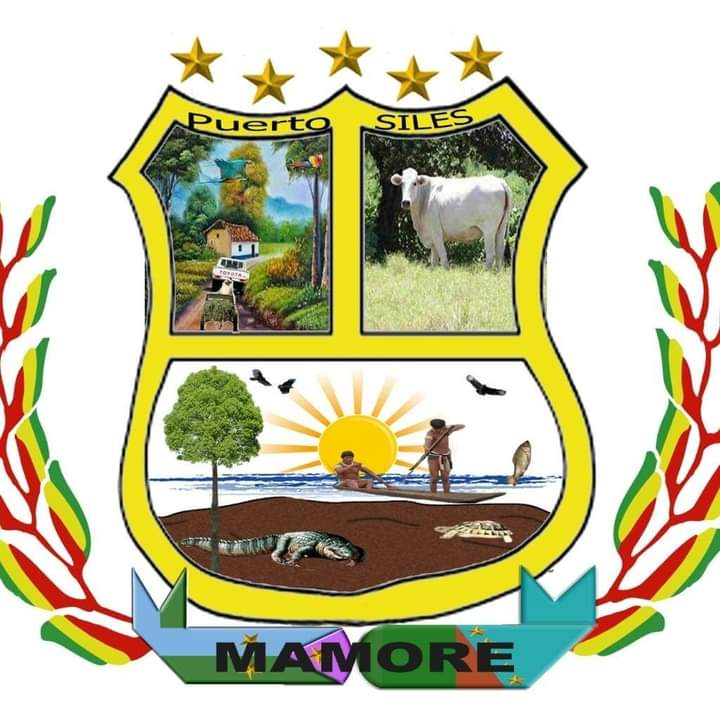
- Flag Coat of arms
- Interactive map of Puerto Siles Municipality
- Country: Bolivia
- Department: Beni Department
- Province: Mamoré Province
- Time zone: UTC-4 (BOT)

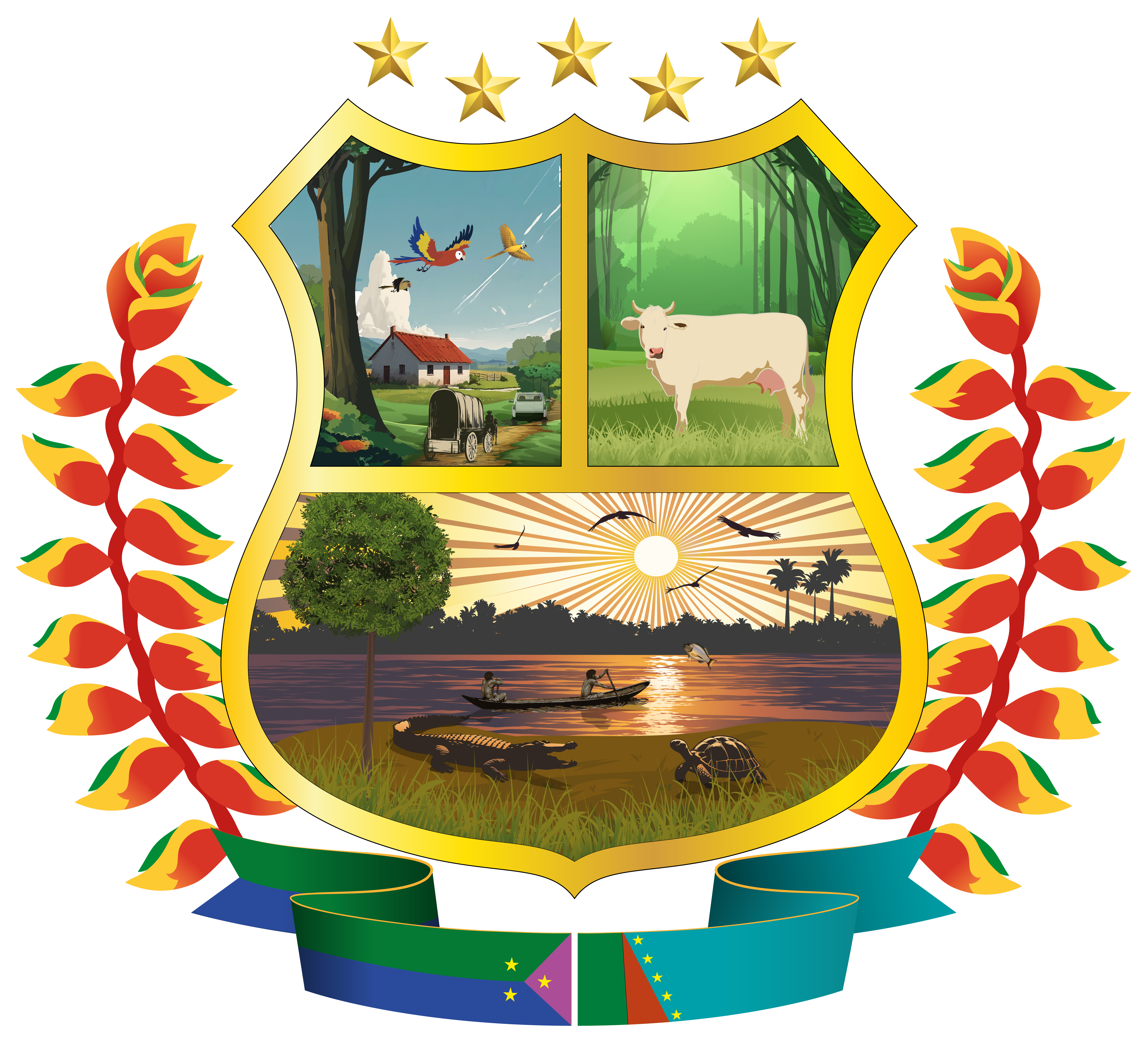
Coat of arms of the Municipality of Puerto Siles, in the Mamoré Province of the Department of Beni, Bolivia

Puerto Siles Municipality is a municipality of the Beni Department, Bolivia.
