= Villa Patarani =

Coordinates: 17.2558°S 68.0261°W

- Town
- Interactive map of Villa Patarani
- Country: Bolivia
- Time zone: UTC-4 (BOT)

Villa Patarani is a small town in Bolivia.
