= San Pedro de Curahuara =

Coordinates: 17°39′S 68°03′W

- Town
- Interactive map of San Pedro de Curahuara
- Country: Bolivia

Population (2001)
  - Total: 292
- Time zone: UTC-4 (BOT)

San Pedro de Curahuara is a small town in Bolivia.
