= Villa Vilaque =

Coordinates: 16.4286°S 68.3325°W

- Town
- Interactive map of Villa Vilaque
- Country: Bolivia
- Time zone: UTC-4 (BOT)

Villa Vilaque is a small town in Bolivia.
