= Lajma =

Coordinates: 17°54′S 67°40′W

- Town
- Interactive map of Lajma
- Country: Bolivia
- Time zone: UTC-4 (BOT)

Lajma is a small town in Bolivia.
