= Villa Remedios =

Coordinates: 16°46′S 68°10′W

- Town
- Interactive map of Villa Remedios
- Country: Bolivia
- Time zone: UTC-4 (BOT)

Villa Remedios is a small town in Bolivia.
