= Abuná Province =

Province in the Bolivian department of Pando

Abuná
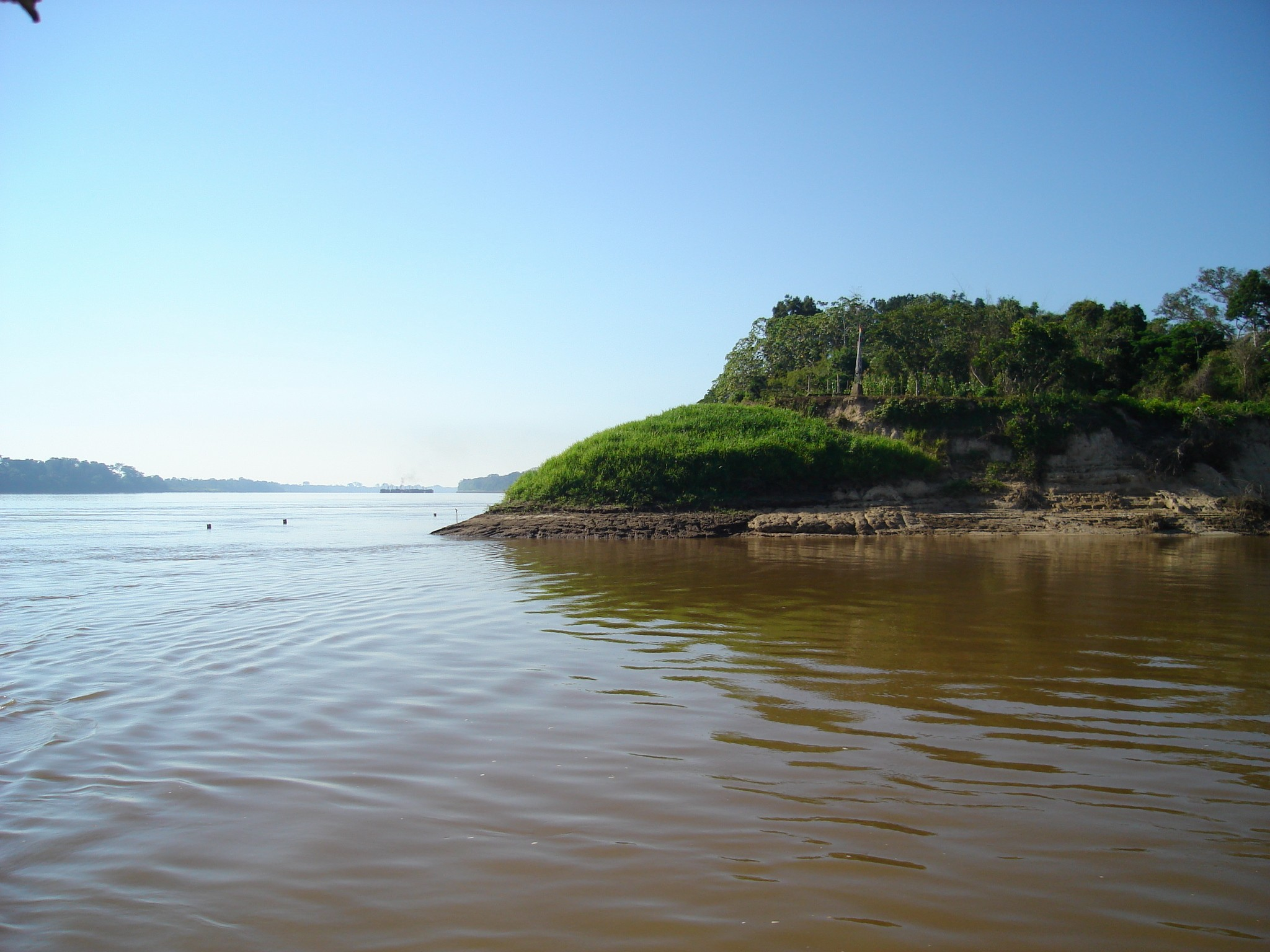
- Rio Abuna
- Interactive map of Abuná
- Coordinates: 10°40′S 67°00′W
- Country: Bolivia
- Department: Pando

Area
  - Land: 7,468 km^{2} (2,883 sq mi)

Population (2024)
  - Total: 5,439
- ISO 3166 code: BO.PA.AB

Abuná is one of the five provinces of the Bolivian department of Pando and is situated in the department's northern central parts. It has its name from Río Abuná, the border river to neighbouring Brazil.

== Location ==
Abuná province is located between 9° 53' and 11° 06' South and between 66° 27' and 67° 42' West. It extends over 120–250 km from North to South, and 350 km from West to East.

The province is situated in the Amazon lowlands of Bolivia and borders Brazil in the North, Nicolás Suárez Province in the Northwest and West, Manuripi Province in the South, and Federico Román Province in the East.

== Population ==
The population of Abuná Province has increased by 40% over the recent two decades:

- 1992: 2,652 inhabitants (census)
- 2001: 2,996 inhabitants (census)
- 2005: 3,475 inhabitants (est.)
- 2024: 5,439 inhabitants (census)

In 1992, 45.4% of the population were younger than 15 years old. 52.3% of the population spoke Spanish, 2.8% spoke Aymara, 2.0% Quechua, and 52.8 spoke other indigenous languages. 83.5% of the population were Catholics and 15.4% were Protestants, and the literacy rate of the province's population was 47.4%. Additionally, 87.6% of the population had no access to electricity and 83.6% had no sanitary facilities.

== Division ==
The province comprises two municipios:

- Santa Rosa del Abuná Municipality - 3,090 km^{2} - 2,097 inhabitants (2001)
- Ingavi Municipality - 4,378 km^{2} - 899 inhabitants (2001)
