= Consata =

- Location in Bolivia
- Coordinates: 15°19′45″S 68°32′11″W
- Country: Bolivia
- Department: La Paz Department
- Elevation: 2,019 m (6,624 ft)

Population (2010)
  - Total: 0

Consata is a town in a region of western Bolivia known for its abundance of gold, especially in the Consata River.
