= Puerto Gonzalo Moreno =

- Town
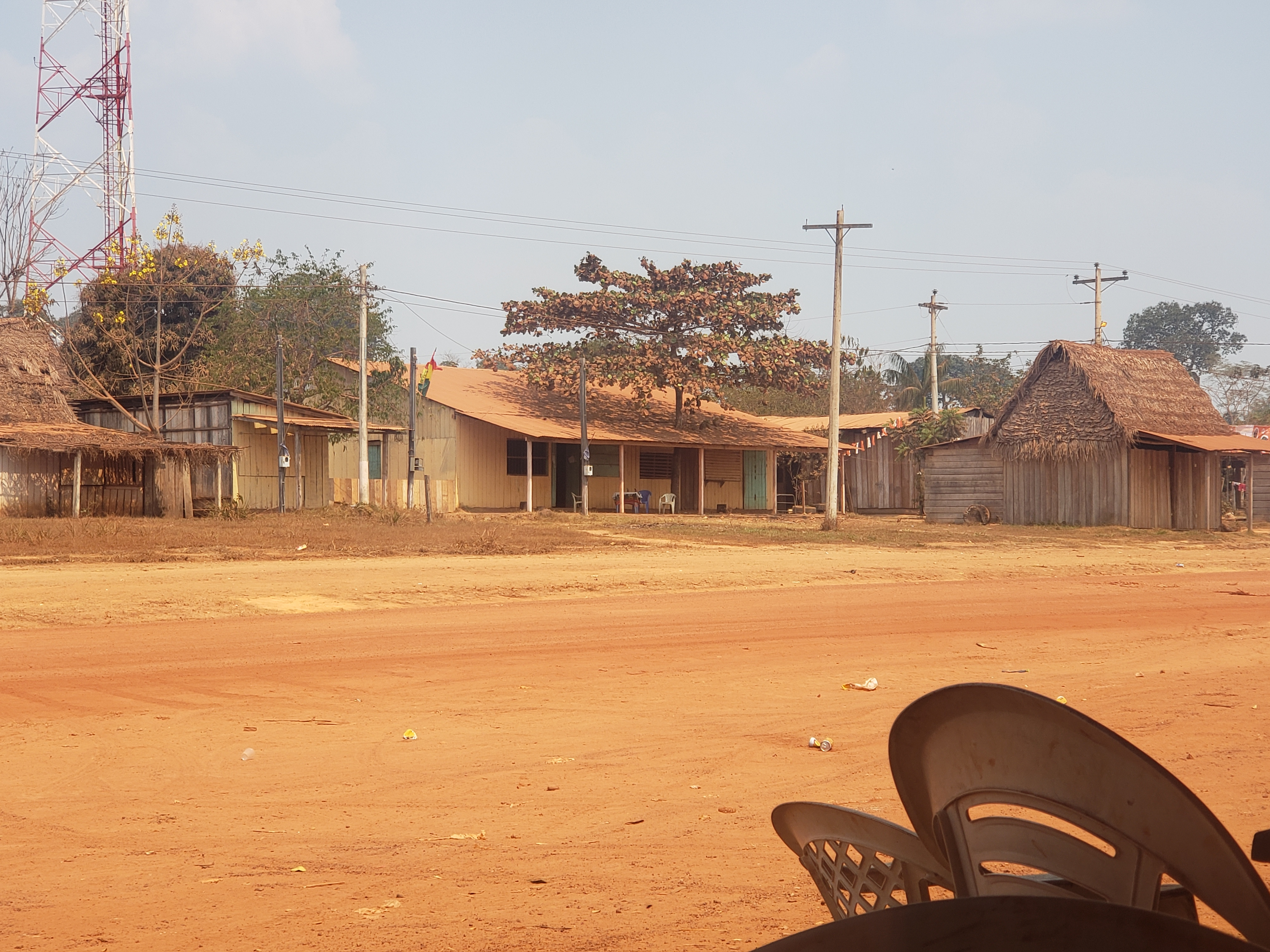
- Houses at Puerto Gonzalo Moreno

- Location within Bolivia
- Coordinates: 11.04°S 66.11°W
- Country: Bolivia
- Time zone: UTC-4 (BOT)

Puerto Gonzalo Moreno is a small town in Bolivia.
