= Eucaliptus =

Coordinates: 17°35′S 67°31′W

- Town
- Interactive map of Eucaliptus
- Country: Bolivia
- Department: Oruro
- Time zone: UTC-4 (BOT)

Eucaliptus is a small town in Bolivia. In 2010 it had an estimated population of 2354.
