= Guayaramerín Municipality =

- Municipality
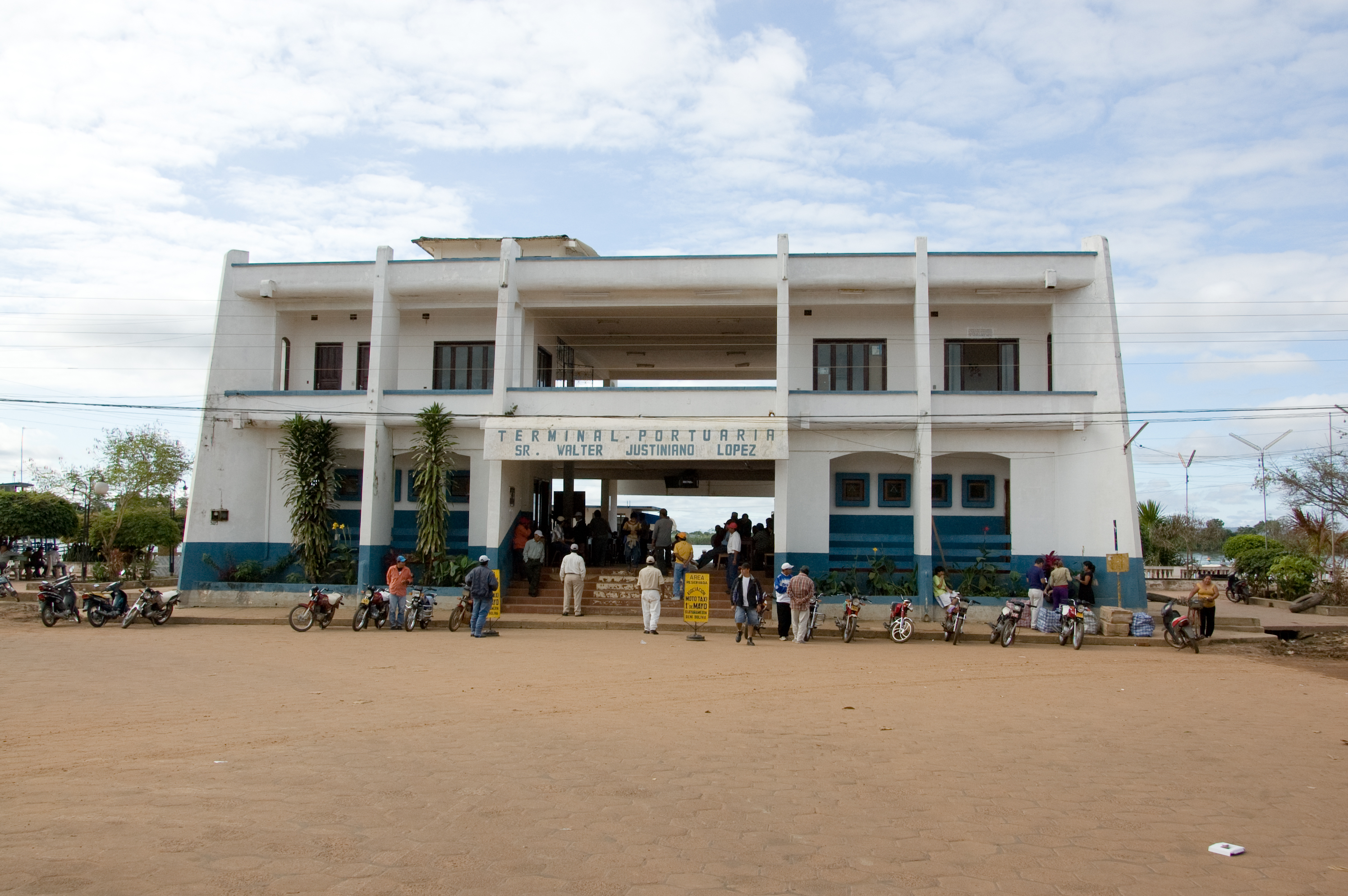
- Cachuela Esperanza and Beni River

- Location within Bolivia
- Coordinates: 11°10′S 65°30′W
- Country: Bolivia
- Department: Beni Department

Population (2001)
  - Total: 40,444
- Time zone: UTC-4 (BOT)

Guayaramerín Municipality is a municipality of the Beni Department in Bolivia.
