= Nueva Esperanza, Pando =

Coordinates: 9.90917°S 65.3842°W

Nueva Esperanza (Pando)
- Town
- Interactive map of Nueva Esperanza (Pando)
- Country: Bolivia
- Time zone: UTC-4 (BOT)

Nueva Esperanza (Pando) is a small town in Bolivia.
