= Pando Department =

Department of Bolivia

Coordinates: 11°11′S 67°11′W

Pando Departamento de Pando (Spanish)
- Department
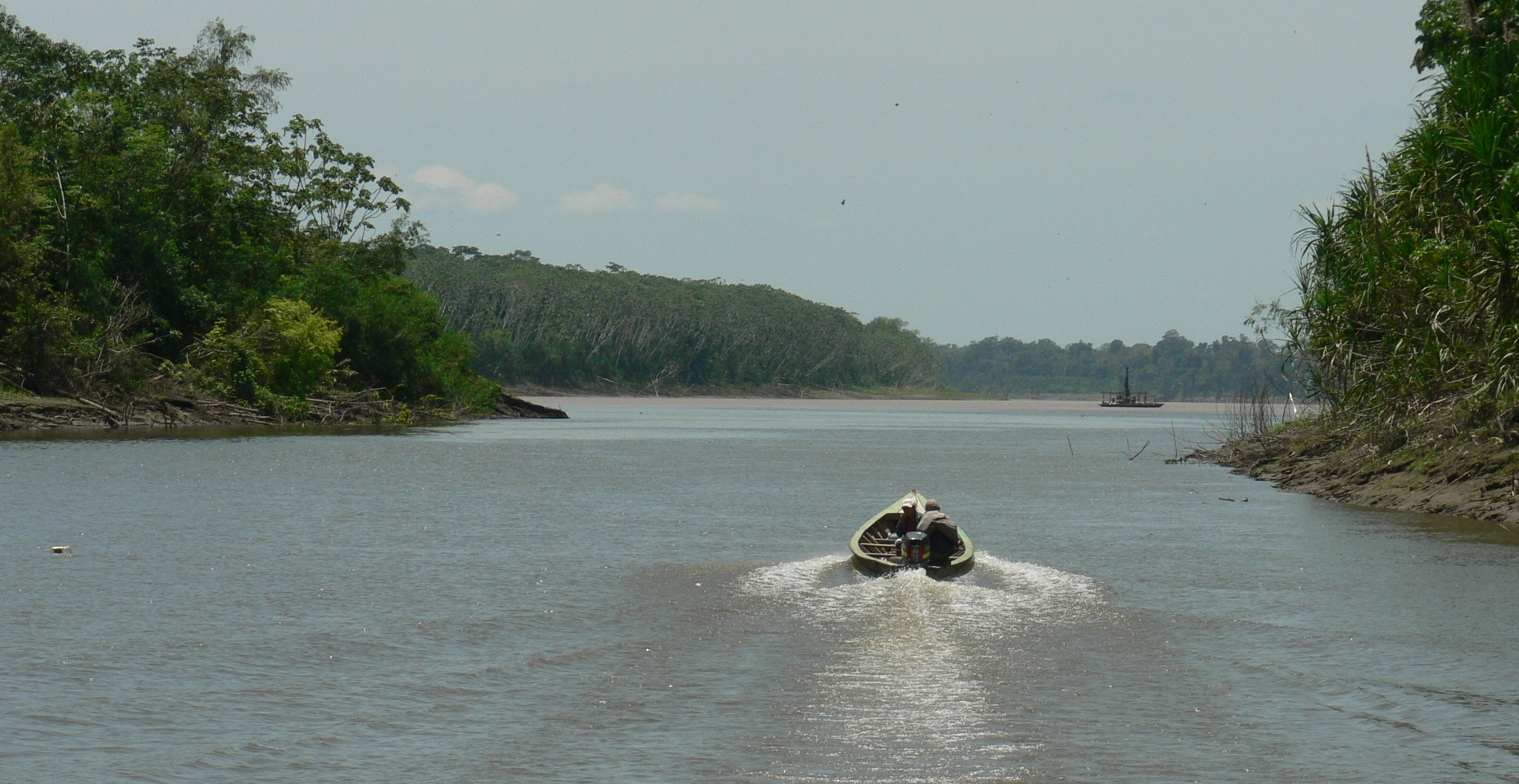
- Meeting of Waters, Manuripi and Madre de Dios Rivers, Near Sena, Bolivia

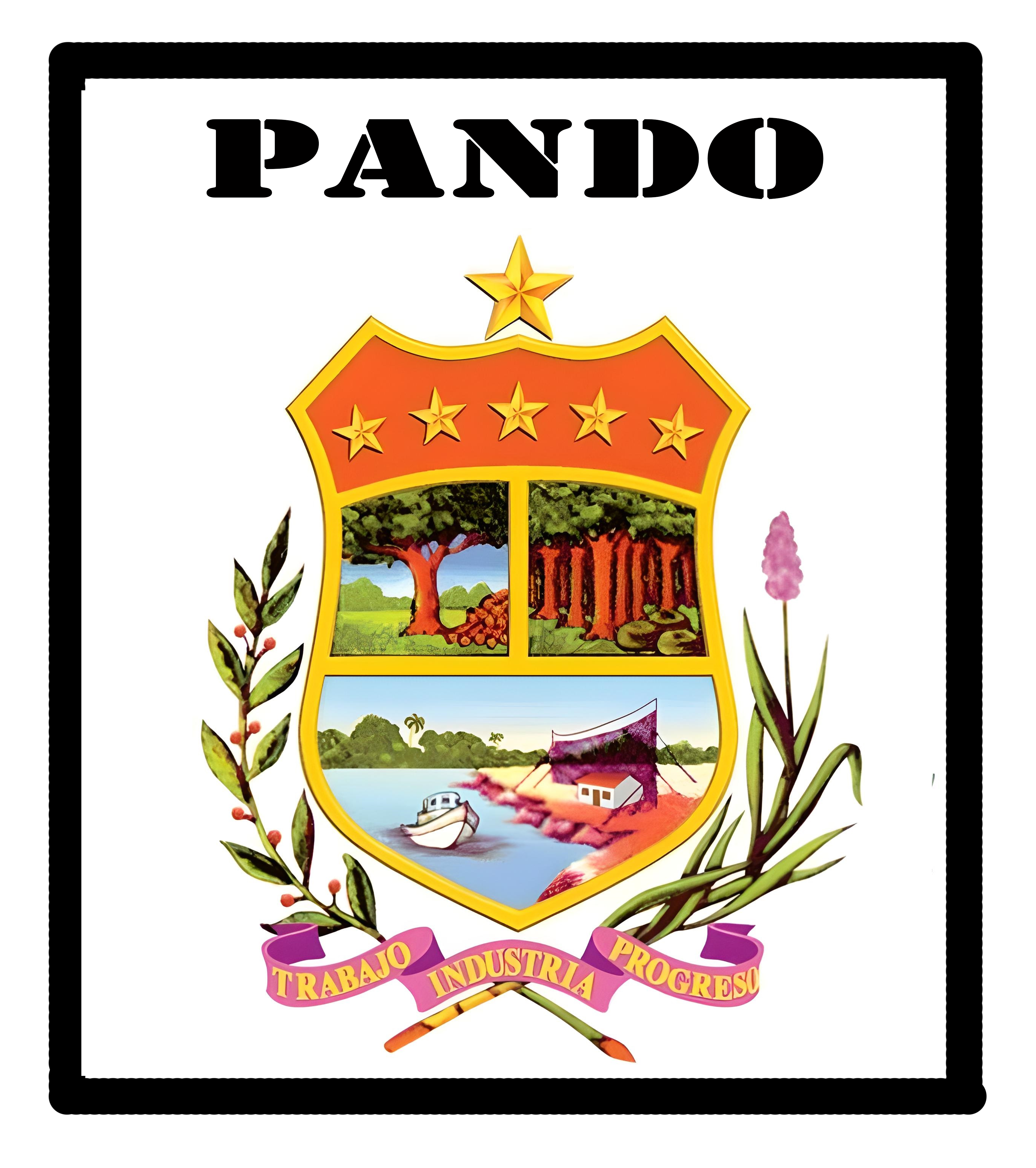
- Flag Coat of arms
- Motto: "Trabajo Industria Progreso" "Work, Industry, Progress"
- Anthem: Tierra santa, vestida de gloria Holy land, dressed in glory
- Pando Department (red) within Bolivia.
- Established: September 24, 1938
- Named for: José Manuel Pando
- Capital: Cobija^{a}
- Provinces: 5

Government
  - Body: Departmental Legislative Assembly of Pando
  - Governor: Regis Germán Richter (MTS)
  - Vice Governor: Ana Paula Valenzuela
  - Senators: 4 of 36
  - Deputies: 5 of 130

Area
  - Total: 63,827 km^{2} (24,644 sq mi)
  - Rank: 5th in Bolivia
- 5.82% of Bolivia

Population (2024 census)
  - Total: 130,761
  - Density: 2.0487/km^{2} (5.3061/sq mi)
  - % of Bolivia: 1.0
  - Rank: 9th in Bolivia
- Time zone: UTC-4 (BOT)
- Area code: +(591) 3
- ISO 3166 code: BO-N
- Official language: Spanish
- GDP (2023): in constant Dollar of 2015
- Total: US$ 0.5 billion Int$ 1.1 billion (PPP)
- Per capita: US$ 2,900; Int$ 6,700 (PPP)
- Abbreviations: PA
- HDI (2019): 0.743 high · 2nd of 9
- Website: www.pando.gob.bo
- a. Also largest city.

Pando is a department in Northern Bolivia, with an area of 63,827 square kilometres (24,644 sq mi), in the Amazon rainforest, adjoining the border with Brazil and Perú. Pando has a population of 130,761 (2024 census). Its capital is the city of Cobija.

The department, named after former president José Manuel Pando (1899–1905), is divided into five provinces. Although Pando is rich in natural resources, the poverty level of its inhabitants is high, due largely to the lack of roads effectively linking the province to the rest of the country. In addition, residents suffer from debilitating effects of tropical diseases, typical of life in the Amazonian rain forest. The main economic activities are agriculture, timber, and cattle.

At an altitude of 280 metres above sea level in the northwestern jungle region, Pando is located in the rainiest part of Bolivia. Pando has a hot climate, with temperatures commonly above 26 degrees Celsius (80 Fahrenheit). It is the least populous department in Bolivia, the most tropical (lying closest to the Equator in the Amazonian Basin), and the most isolated, due to an absence of effective roads. It was organized at the beginning of the 20th century from what was left of the Acre Territory, lost to Brazil as a result of the so-called Acre War (1903). Its capital city of Cobija (the smallest of all the Bolivian departmental capitals) was named after the much-lamented Bolivian port of the same name on the Pacific Ocean, part of an area lost to Chile following the War of the Pacific.

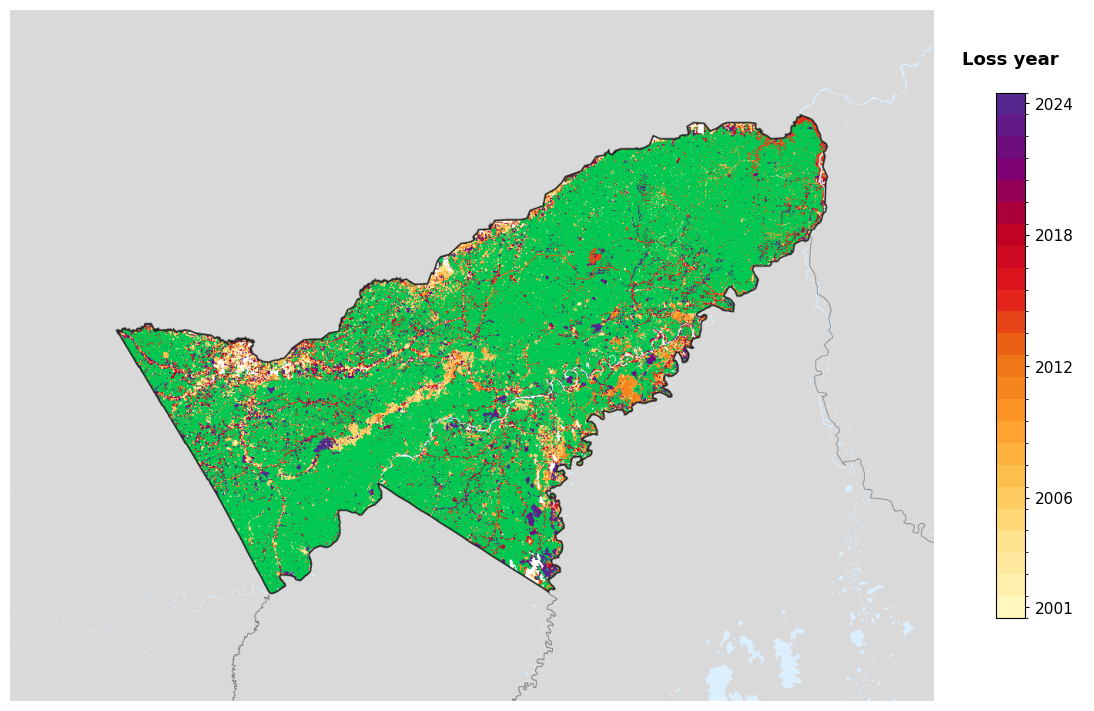
Tree-cover loss year in Pando, 2001-2024, from the Global Forest Change dataset.

Although remote, Pando is densely forested and close to navigable waterways leading to the Amazon River and from there on to the Atlantic Ocean. The department had a rubber boom in the late 19th century and early 20th century, along with the northern part of the nearby Beni department. The local industry collapsed under competition with rubber cultivated in Southeast Asia, as well as the discovery and manufacture of synthetic rubber.

Culturally, the Pandinos are considered part of the so-called Camba culture of the Bolivian lowlands, similar to the people of the country's other two tropical departments, Beni and Santa Cruz. Many of Pando's original settlers moved from nearby Beni.

== Autonomy movement ==
Far from the centers of power in Bolivian society, Pando has recently linked its fate with that of Santa Cruz and Beni, which (along with Tarija and Chuquisaca) are demanding increased autonomy for the departments, with a lessening in central government power. Prefect Leopoldo Fernández strongly backed autonomy for the department, in alliance with other governors of the eastern media luna (half-moon, so known for their combined geographic shape). Nationwide referendums on autonomy held on July 2, 2006, were approved in all four departments. A second referendum to approve a statute of autonomy was held by each department in mid-2008, despite being declared illegal by the National Electoral Court in March. Left-wing and pro-Morales social movements boycotted the votes.

Pando's referendum, held on June 1, 2008, won 82% approval among those who voted. But 46.5% of the registered electorate did not vote, the highest abstention rate in the four departments holding such referendums. Considerable social unrest took place in 2008, culminating with the arrest in September 2008 of Prefect Leopoldo Fernández, stemming from the massacre at El Porvenir of anti-autonomy backers of President Evo Morales.

== Provinces of Pando ==
- Abuná
- Federico Román
- Madre de Dios
- Manuripi
- Nicolás Suárez

== Government ==
=== Executive offices ===
The chief executive office of Bolivia departments (since May 2010) is the governor; until then, the office was called the prefect, and until 2006 the prefect was appointed by the President of Bolivia. The current governor, Regis Germán Richter of the MTS was elected on 11 April 2021 after winning the second round of the regional election.

Took office	Office expired	Prefect/Governor	Party	Notes
24 Jan 2006	16 Sep 2008	Leopoldo Fernández Ferreira	PODEMOS	First elected prefect. Elected in Bolivian general election, December 2005, removed from office.
16 Sep 2008	30 May 2010	Landelino Rafael Bandeira Arze (interim)	Independent	Appointed via presidential decree No. 29712, after Leopoldo Fernández was arrested for his role in the Porvenir massacre.
30 May 2010	24 Dec 2014	Luís Adolfo Flores Roberts	MAS-IPSP	Elected in the first round of the regional election on 4 April 2010; first governor.
24 Dec 2014	31 May 2015	Edgar Polanco Tirina (interim)	MAS-IPSP	
31 May 2015	3 Nov 2020	Luís Adolfo Flores Roberts	MAS-IPSP	Elected in the first round of the regional election on 29 March 2015.
3 Nov 2020	3 May 2021	Paola Terrazas Justiniano (interim)	MAS-IPSP	
3 May 2021		Regis Germán Richter Alencar	MTS	Elected in a run-off election on 11 April 2021 during the regional elections.

=== Legislative Assembly ===
Under the 2009 Constitution, a Departmental Legislative Assembly was instituted for each Bolivian department. The first elections hereunto were held on 4 April 2010. The legislature has 21 members. Its current composition, per the last regional election, is 13 seats for the MAS-IPSP, 3 for indigenous representatives, 2 for the Democratic Integration Community and one each for MTS, Movimiento Democrático Autonomista and We Are All Pando.

The current executive committee was determined per vote on 2 May 2022, selecting Olga Feliciano Ampuero as president, Almir Flores Muzumbite as vice-president, Josué Olmos Quetehuari as secretary and Keila Tirina Peralta and Georgina Ribero Chao as first and second committee member, respectively.

== Demographics ==
Historical population
Year	Pop.	±% p.a.
1976	34,493	—
1992	38,072	+0.62%
2001	52,525	+3.64%
2012	110,436	+6.99%
2024	130,761	+1.42%
Source: Citypopulation

== Languages ==
The predominant language in the department is Spanish. The following table shows the number of those belonging to the recognized group of speakers.

Language	Pando	Bolivia
Quechua	1,708	2,281,198
Aymara	1,848	1,525,321
Guaraní	35	62,575
Another native	861	49,432
Spanish	45,969	6,821,626
Foreign	7,719	250,754
Only native	336	960,491
Native and Spanish	3,676	2,739,407
Spanish and foreign	44,491	4,115,751

== Places of interest ==
- Manuripi-Heath Amazonian Wildlife National Reserve
- International Recreational Fishing Championship of Puerto Rico, Pando, Bolivia
- Porvenir (Pando)

== Gallery ==
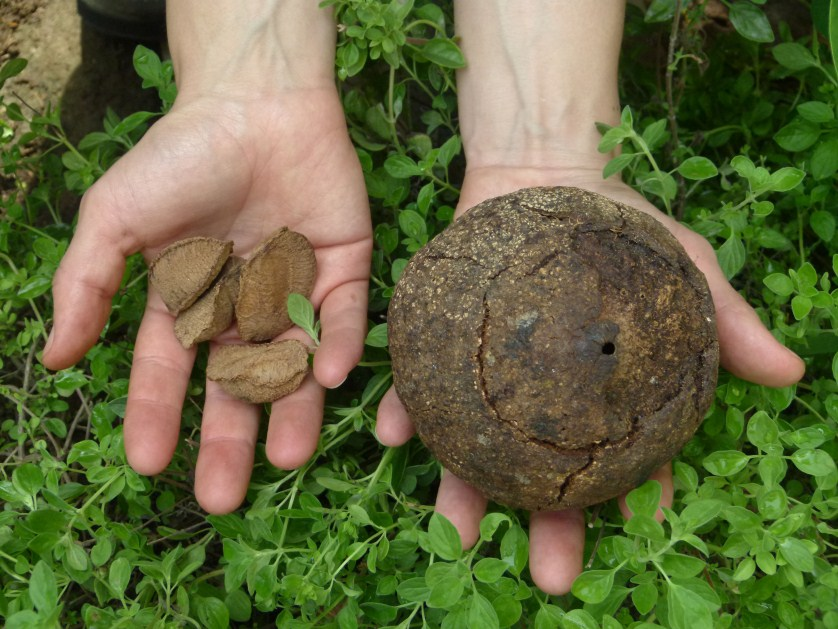
The Brazil nut seen near Cobija

A typical Jaguar in the Amazon

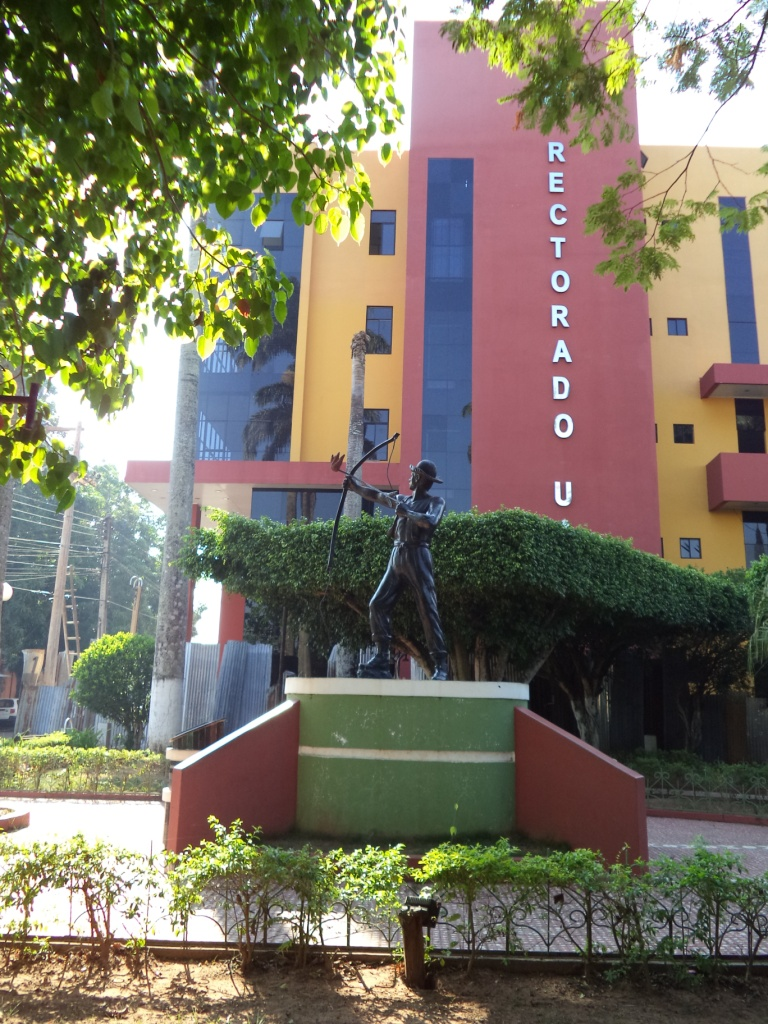
Cobija is the departamental capital

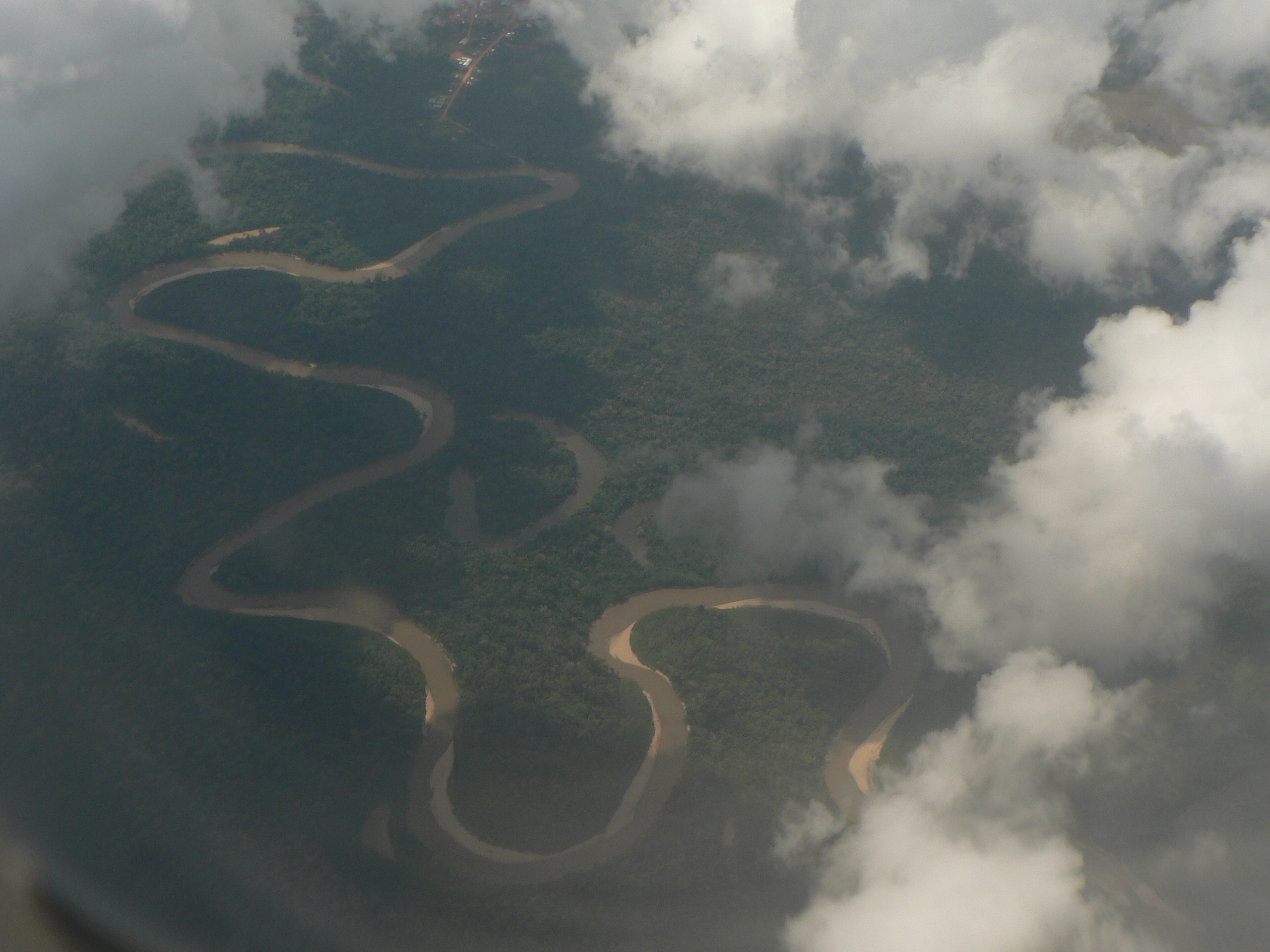
Typical Amazonian meanders on Tahuamanu River near Filadelfia, Pando, Bolivia

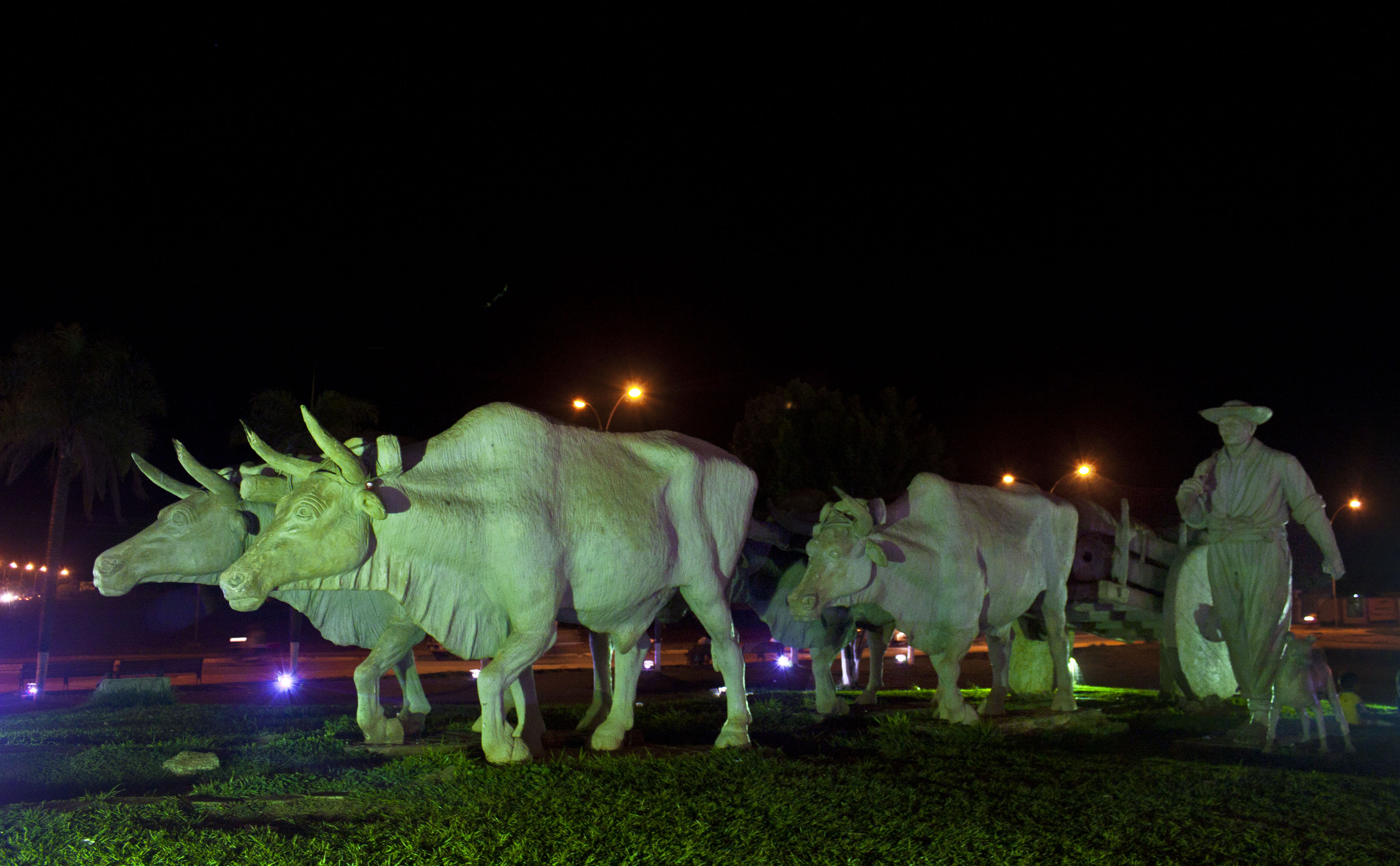
Monument in Cobija
