= Municipalities of Bolivia =

Municipalities in Bolivia (Spanish: municipios) are administrative divisions of the entire national territory governed by local elections. Municipalities are the third level of administrative divisions, below departments and provinces. Some of the provinces consist of only one municipality. In these cases the municipalities are identical to the provinces they belong to. There are 340 municipalities.

== History of governance ==
Municipalities in Bolivia are each led by a mayor, an executive office. Mayors were appointed by the national government from 1878 to 1942 and from 1949 to 1987. Local elections were held under the 1942 municipal code, which was in force until 1991. The 1985 Organic Law of Municipalities restored local elections for mayor and created a legislative body, the municipal council.

In 1994, the entire territory of Bolivia was merged into municipalities, where previously only urban areas were organized as municipalities. As an effect of decentralization through the 1994 Law of Popular Participation the number of municipalities in Bolivia has risen from an initial 273 (in 1985) to 327 (in 2002), to 337 (at the time of the 2010 elections), to 339 (as of August 2010). Of the 327 municipalities existing after 2005, 187 are inhabited by a mainly indigenous population; 184 of these are located in the five Andean departments, with the remaining three in Santa Cruz department. New municipalities must have at least 10,000 residents, or 5,000 in the case of border areas.

== List of municipalities ==
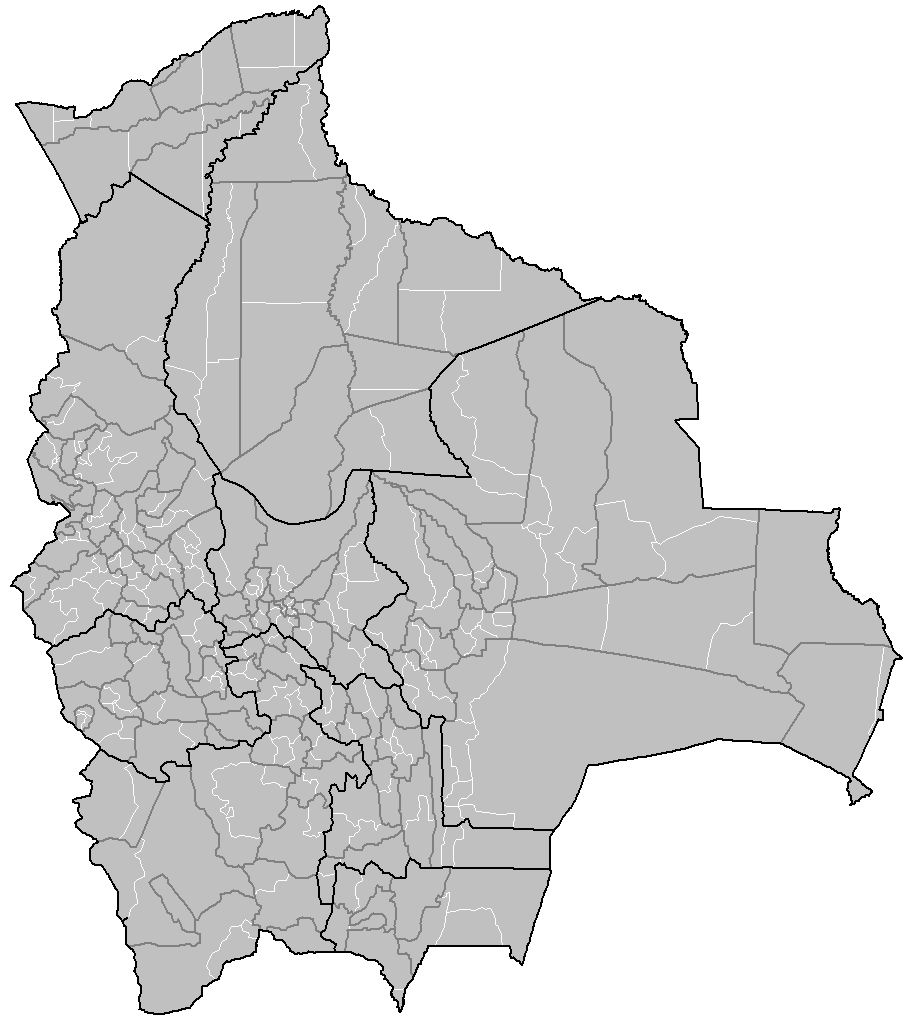
Municipalities of Bolivia

The municipalities are as follows ordered by department:

=== Beni ===
- Baures Municipality
- Exaltación Municipality
- Guayaramerín Municipality
- Huacaraje Municipality
- Loreto Municipality, Beni
- Magdalena Municipality, Beni
- Puerto Siles Municipality
- Reyes Municipality
- Riberalta Municipality
- Rurrenabaque Municipality
- San Andrés Municipality, Beni
- San Borja Municipality
- San Ignacio Municipality, Beni
- San Javier Municipality, Beni
- San Joaquín Municipality, Beni
- San Ramón Municipality, Beni
- Santa Ana Municipality, Beni
- Santa Rosa Municipality, Beni
- Trinidad Municipality, Beni

=== Cochabamba ===
- Aiquile Municipality
- Alalay Municipality
- Anzaldo Municipality
- Arani Municipality
- Arbieto Municipality
- Arque Municipality
- Ayopaya Municipality
- Bolívar Municipality, Cochabamba
- Capinota Municipality
- Chimoré Municipality
- Cliza Municipality
- Cocapata Municipality
- Cochabamba Municipality
- Colcapirhua Municipality
- Colomi Municipality
- Cuchumuela Municipality
- Entre Ríos Municipality, Cochabamba
- Mizque Municipality
- Morochata Municipality
- Muela Municipality
- Omereque Municipality
- Pasorapa Municipality
- Pocona Municipality
- Pojo Municipality
- Puerto Villarroel Municipality
- Punata Municipality
- Quillacollo Municipality
- Sacaba Municipality
- Sacabamba Municipality
- San Benito Municipality
- Santivañez Municipality
- Shinahota Municipality / Shinaota Municipality / Sinahota Municipality
- Sicaya Municipality
- Sipe Sipe Municipality
- Tacachi Municipality
- Tacopaya Municipality
- Tapacarí Municipality
- Tarata Municipality
- Tiquipaya Municipality
- Tiraque Municipality
- Toco Municipality
- Tolata Municipality
- Totora Municipality
- Vacas Municipality
- Vila Vila Municipality
- Villa Tunari Municipality
- Vinto Municipality

=== Chuquisaca ===
- Azurduy Municipality
- Camargo Municipality, Chuquisaca
- Culpina Municipality
- El Villar Municipality
- Huacareta Municipality
- Huacaya Municipality
- Icla Municipality
- Incahuasi Municipality
- Mojocoya Municipality
- Camataqui Municipality
- Las Carreras Municipality
- Macharetí Municipality
- Monteagudo Municipality
- Padilla Municipality
- Poroma Municipality
- Presto Municipality
- San Lucas Municipality
- Sopachuy Municipality
- Sucre Municipality, Bolivia
- Tarabuco Municipality
- Tomina Municipality
- Villa Alcalá Municipality
- Villa Abecia Municipality
- Villa Charcas Municipality
- Villa Serrano Municipality
- Villa Vaca Guzmán Municipality
- Villa Zudañez Municipality
- Tarvita Municipality
- Yotala Municipality
- Yamparáez Municipality

=== La Paz ===
- Achacachi Municipality
- Achocalla Municipality
- Alto Beni Municipality
- Ancoraimes Municipality
- Apolo Municipality
- Aucapata Municipality
- Ayata Municipality
- Ayo Ayo Municipality
- Batallas Municipality
- Cairoma Municipality
- Cajuata Municipality
- Calacoto Municipality
- Calamarca Municipality
- Caquiaviri Municipality
- Caranavi Municipality
- Catacora Municipality
- Chacarilla Municipality
- Charaña Municipality
- Chúa Cocani Municipality
- Chulumani Municipality
- Chuma Municipality
- Collana Municipality
- Colquencha Municipality
- Colquiri Municipality
- Comanche Municipality
- Combaya Municipality
- Copacabana Municipality, La Paz
- Coripata Municipality
- Coro Coro Municipality
- Coroico Municipality
- Curva Municipality
- Desaguadero Municipality
- El Alto Municipality, La Paz
- Escoma Municipality
- General Juan José Pérez Municipality
- Guanay Municipality
- Guaqui Municipality
- Huatajata Municipality
- Huarina Municipality
- Humanata Municipality
- Ichoca Municipality
- Inquisivi Municipality
- Irupana Municipality
- Ixiamas Municipality
- Jesús de Machaca Municipality
- La Asunta Municipality
- La Paz Municipality
- Laja Municipality
- Licoma Pampa Municipality
- Luribay Municipality
- Malla Municipality
- Mecapaca Municipality
- Mocomoco Municipality
- Nazacara de Pacajes Municipality
- Palca Municipality
- Palos Blancos Municipality
- Papel Pampa Municipality
- Patacamaya Municipality
- Pelechuco Municipality
- Pucarani Municipality
- Puerto Acosta Municipality
- Puerto Carabuco Municipality
- Puerto Pérez Municipality
- Quiabaya Municipality
- Quime Municipality
- San Andrés de Machaca Municipality
- San Buenaventura Municipality, La Paz
- San Pedro de Curahuara Municipality
- San Pedro de Tiquina Municipality
- Santiago de Callapa Municipality
- Santiago de Huata Municipality
- Santiago de Machaca Municipality
- Sapahaqui Municipality
- Sica Sica Municipality
- Sorata Municipality
- Tacacoma Municipality
- Taraco Municipality
- Tiwanaku Municipality
- Tipuani Municipality
- Tito Yupanqui Municipality
- Umala Municipality
- Viacha Municipality
- Waldo Ballivián Municipality
- Yaco Municipality
- Yanacachi Municipality

=== Oruro ===
- Andamarca Municipality
- Antequera Municipality
- Belén de Andamarca Municipality
- Caracollo Municipality
- Carangas Municipality
- Challapata Municipality
- Chipaya Municipality
- Choquecota Municipality
- Coipasa Municipality
- Corque Municipality
- Cruz de Machacamarca Municipality
- Curahuara de Carangas Municipality
- El Choro Municipality
- Escara Municipality
- Esmeralda Municipality
- Eucaliptus Municipality
- Huachacalla Municipality
- Huanuni Municipality
- Huayllamarca Municipality
- La Rivera Municipality
- Machacamarca Municipality
- Oruro Municipality
- Pampa Aullagas Municipality
- Pazña Municipality
- Sabaya Municipality
- Salinas de Garci Mendoza Municipality
- Santiago de Huari Municipality
- Santuario de Quillacas Municipality
- Todos Santos Municipality
- Toledo Municipality
- Totora Municipality, Oruro
- Turco Municipality
- Poopó Municipality
- Yunguyo del Litoral Municipality

=== Pando ===
- Bella Flor Municipality
- Bolpebra Municipality
- Cobija Municipality
- Filadelfia Municipality
- Ingavi Municipality
- Nueva Esperanza Municipality
- Porvenir Municipality
- Puerto Gonzalo Moreno Municipality
- Puerto Rico Municipality
- San Lorenzo Municipality, Pando
- San Pedro Municipality, Pando
- Santa Rosa del Abuná Municipality
- Santos Mercado Municipality
- Sena Municipality
- Villa Nueva Municipality

=== Potosí ===
- Acasio Municipality
- Arampampa Municipality
- Atocha Municipality
- Betanzos Municipality
- Caiza "D" Municipality
- Chochas Municipality / Cochas Municipality
- Caripuyo Municipality
- Chaquí Municipality
- Chayanta Municipality
- Chuquihuta Municipality / Chuquihuta Ayllu Jucumani
- Colcha "K" Municipality
- Colquechaca Municipality
- Cotagaita Municipality
- Llallagua Municipality
- Llica Municipality
- Mojinete Municipality
- Ocurí Municipality
- Pocoata Municipality
- Porco Municipality
- Potosí Municipality
- Puna Municipality
- Ravelo Municipality
- Sacaca Municipality
- San Agustín Municipality
- San Antonio de Esmoruco Municipality
- San Pablo de Lípez Municipality
- San Pedro de Buena Vista Municipality
- San Pedro de Quemes Municipality
- Tacobamba Municipality
- Tahua Municipality
- Tinguipaya Municipality
- Tomave Municipality
- Toro Toro Municipality
- Tupiza Municipality
- Uncía Municipality
- Urmiri Municipality
- Uyuni Municipality
- Villazón Municipality
- Vitichi Municipality
- Yocalla Municipality

=== Santa Cruz ===
- Ascensión de Guarayos Municipality
- Ayacucho Municipality, Santa Cruz / Porongo Municipality
- Boyuibe Municipality
- Buena Vista Municipality
- Cabezas Municipality
- Camiri Municipality
- Charagua Municipality
- Colpa Bélgica Municipality
- Comarapa Municipality
- Concepción Municipality
- Cotoca Municipality
- Cuatro Cañadas Municipality
- Cuevo Municipality
- El Carmen Rivero Tórrez Municipality
- El Puente Municipality, Santa Cruz
- El Torno Municipality
- Fernández Alonso Municipality
- General Saavedra Municipality
- Gutiérrez Municipality
- La Guardia Municipality
- Lagunillas Municipality, Santa Cruz
- Mairana Municipality
- Mineros Municipality
- Montero Municipality
- Moro Moro Municipality
- Okinawa Municipality
- Pailón Municipality
- Pampa Grande Municipality
- Portachuelo Municipality
- Postrer Valle Municipality
- Pucara Municipality
- Puerto Quijarro Municipality
- Puerto Suarez Municipality
- Quirusillas Municipality
- Roboré Municipality
- Saipina Municipality
- Samaipata Municipality
- San Antonio del Lomerío Municipality
- San Carlos Municipality, Santa Cruz
- San Ignacio Municipality, Santa Cruz
- San Javier Municipality, Santa Cruz
- San José Municipality
- San Julián Municipality
- San Matías Municipality
- San Miguel Municipality
- San Pedro, Santistevan
- San Rafael Municipality, Santa Cruz
- San Ramón Municipality, Santa Cruz
- Santa Cruz de la Sierra Municipality
- Santa Rosa del Sara Municipality
- Trigal Municipality
- Urubichá Municipality
- Vallegrande Municipality / Valle Grande Municipality
- Warnes Municipality
- Yapacaní Municipality

=== Tarija ===
- Bermejo Municipality
- Caraparí Municipality
- El Puente Municipality, Tarija
- Entre Ríos Municipality, Tarija
- Padcaya Municipality
- San Lorenzo Municipality, Tarija
- Tarija Municipality
- Uriondo Municipality
- Villamontes Municipality
- Yacuiba Municipality
- Yunchará Municipality
