= Nor Lípez Native Community Lands =

The Nor Lípez Native Community Lands are a collectively owned indigenous territory in the province of Nor Lípez, Potosí, Bolivia, registered as a Native Community Land and titled by the National Agrarian Reform Institute on 19 April 2011.

The territory is governed by the Sole Provincial Center of Originary Communities of Nor Lípez (Spanish: Central Única Provincial de Comunidades Originarias de Nor Lípez) and includes 2,000,291 hectares of land in the cantons of Chillco, Soracaya, Chocaya, San Vicente, Tacmari, Atulcha, Calcha K, Chuvica, Colcha "K", Julaca, Llovica, Río Grande, San Cristóbal, San Juan, Santiago, Santiago de Agencha, Soniquera, Cana, Chiguana, Payancha, Pelcoya, San Pedro de Quemes, San Antonio de Lípez, San Pablo de Lípez, Uyuni, Alota, Cerro Gordo, San Agustín, and Todos Santos. Its size made it the largest Native Community Land in Bolivia as of July 2011.
