= Colorado River (Potosi) =

Río Colorado

Location
- Country: Bolivia
- Region: Potosí Department

Physical characteristics
- Source
  - location: Bolivia
  - coordinates: 21°12′41″S 66°54′38″W
  - elevation: 3771
- Mouth
  - location: Salar de Uyuni
  - coordinates: 20°36′46″S 66°50′54″W
  - elevation: 3,667 m (12,031 ft)
- Length: 103 km (64 mi)

Basin features
- Progression: Río Grande de Lípez

The Río Colorado is a river of Bolivia in the Potosí Department, Nor Lípez Province. It is a tributary of the Río Grande de Lípez, which drains into the Salar de Uyuni, the world's largest salt flat, as part of Bolivia's Altiplano endorheic basin system.

== See also ==
- Puka Mayu
- List of rivers of Bolivia
