= Colcha "K" Municipality =

- Municipality
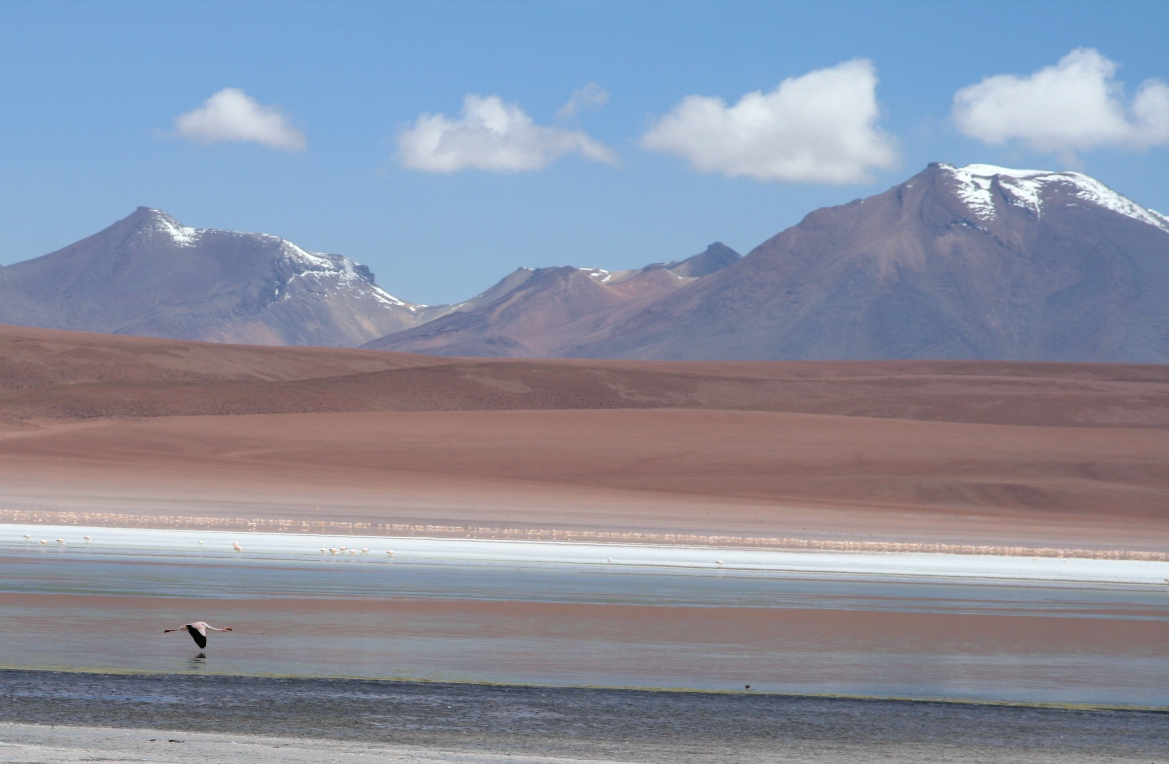
- Lake Kara in Colcha "K" Municipality

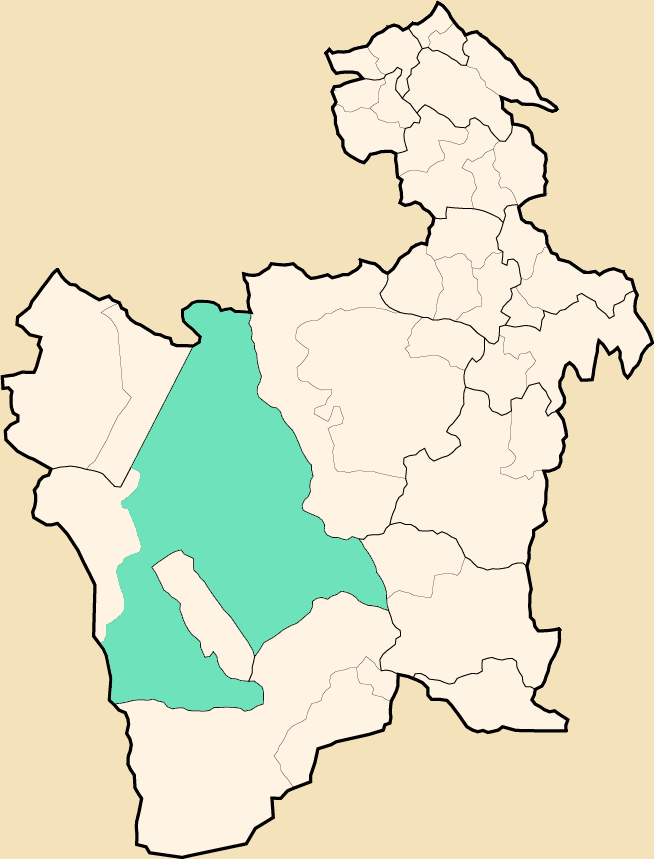
- Location within Potosí Department

- Location within Bolivia
- Coordinates: 20°57′S 67°17′W
- Country: Bolivia
- Department: Potosí Department
- Province: Nor Lípez Province
- Seat: Colcha "K"
- Elevation: 12,500 ft (3,800 m)

Population (2001)
  - Total: 9,645
  - Ethnicities: Quechua
- Time zone: UTC-4 (BOT)

Colcha "K" Municipality is the first municipal section of the Nor Lípez Province in the Potosí Department in Bolivia. Its seat is Colcha "K" or Villa Martín.

== Geography ==
The municipality lies at the Uyuni salt flat.

Some of the highest mountains of the municipality are listed below:

- Allqa Urqu
- Apachita
- Chakra Urqu
- Chinchillani
- Chiwana
- Chullunkhäni
- Chumpi Urqu
- Inti Pastu
- Kachi Unu
- Kuntur Wasi
- Muru
- Puka Urqu
- Puka Wasi
- Qala Wasi
- Qaral
- Siwinqani
- Suni K'ira
- Tijtin
- Yana Urqu
- Yanantillayuq

== Subdivision ==
The municipality consists of the following cantons:

- Atulcha Canton - 102 inhabitants (2001)
- Chuvica Canton - 53 inhabitants
- Calcha "K" Canton - 617 inhabitants
- Cocani Canton - 1.982 inhabitants
- Colcha "K" Canton - 1.229 inhabitants
- Julaca Canton - 61 inhabitants
- Llavica Canton - 274 inhabitants
- Río Grande Canton - 777 inhabitants
- San Cristóbal Canton - 1.980 inhabitants
- San Juan Canton - 981 inhabitants
- Santiago Canton - 509 inhabitants
- Santiago de Agencha Canton - 258 inhabitants
- Soniquera Canton - 822 inhabitants

== The people ==
The people are predominantly indigenous citizens of Quechua descent.

Ethnic group	%
Quechua	88.3
Aymara	5.6
Guaraní, Chiquitos, Moxos	0.1
Not indigenous	6.0
Other indigenous groups	0.1

== See also ==
- Ch'iyar Quta
- Laqaya
- Puka Mayu
