= Ukilla =

Volcano in Bolivia

- Location within Bolivia

Highest point
- Elevation: 5,092 m (16,706 ft)
- Coordinates: 20°50′59″S 68°11′54″W

Geography
- Location: Bolivia, Potosí Department
- Parent range: Andes

Ukilla (Quechua for a medical plant whose seed is used to dye, Hispanicized spelling Uquilla) is a 5,092-metre-high (16,706 ft) volcano in the Bolivian Andes. It is situated in the Potosí Department, Nor Lípez Province, Quemes Municipality. Ukilla lies south of the Uyuni salt flat in a volcanic field known as Pampa Luxsar.

Map of the area showing the location of Ukilla
