= Chulluncani =

Mountain in Bolivia

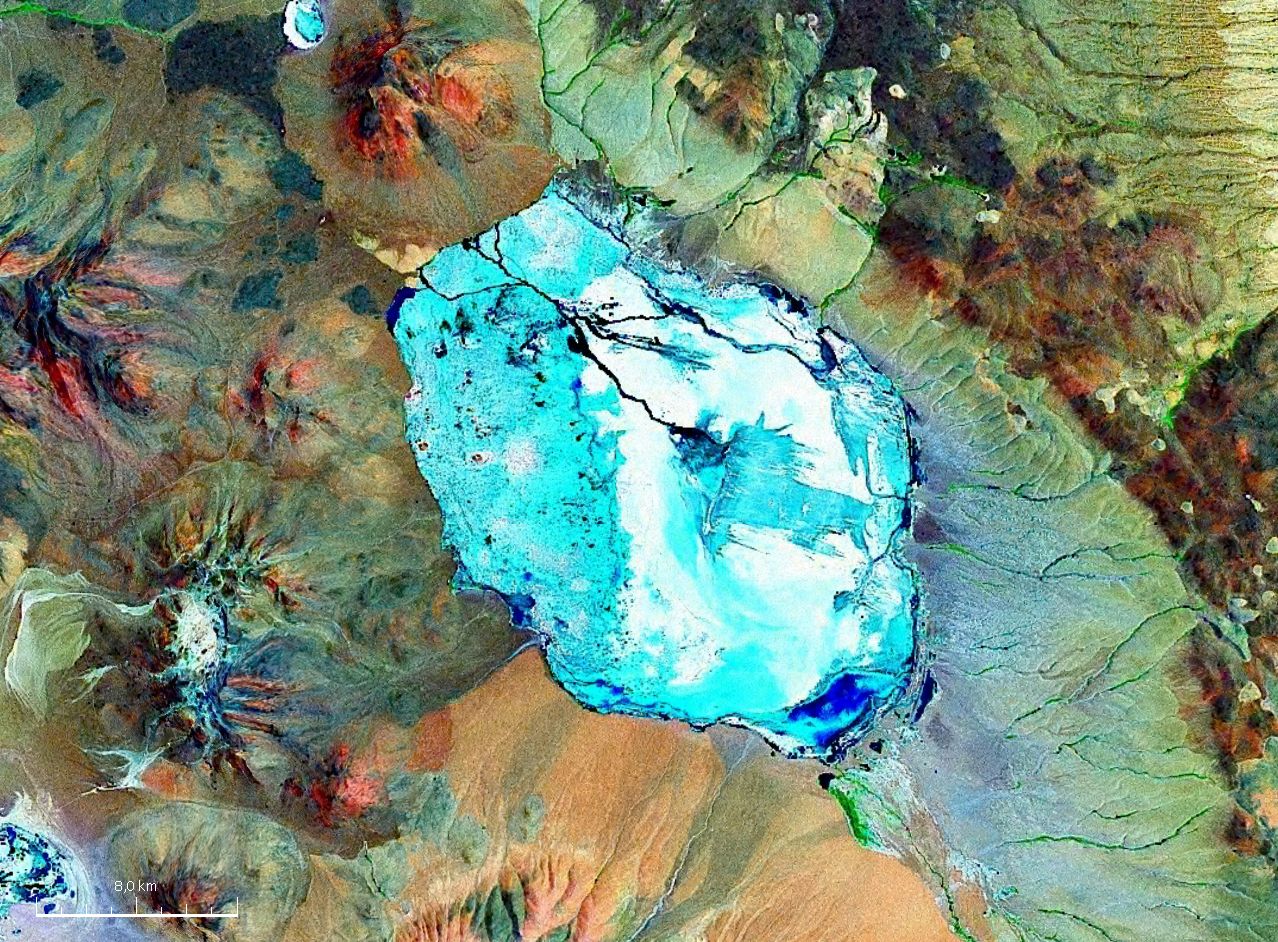
- Chulluncani (upper center left) and Pastos Grandes Lake as seen from above

Highest point
- Elevation: 5,000 m (16,000 ft)
- Coordinates: 21°33′47″S 67°51′20″W

Geography
- Location within Bolivia
- Location: Bolivia, Potosí Department, Nor Lípez Province
- Parent range: Andes

Chulluncani (possibly from Aymara chullunkhä ('ä' stands for a long 'a') icicle) is a mountain in the Andes of Bolivia, about 5,000 metres (16,404 ft) high. It is located in the Potosí Department, Nor Lípez Province, Colcha "K" Municipality, Soniquera Canton. Chulluncani lies at the northwestern shore of Pastos Grandes Lake.

== See also ==
- Ch'iyar Quta
