= Luxsar =

Mountain in Bolivia

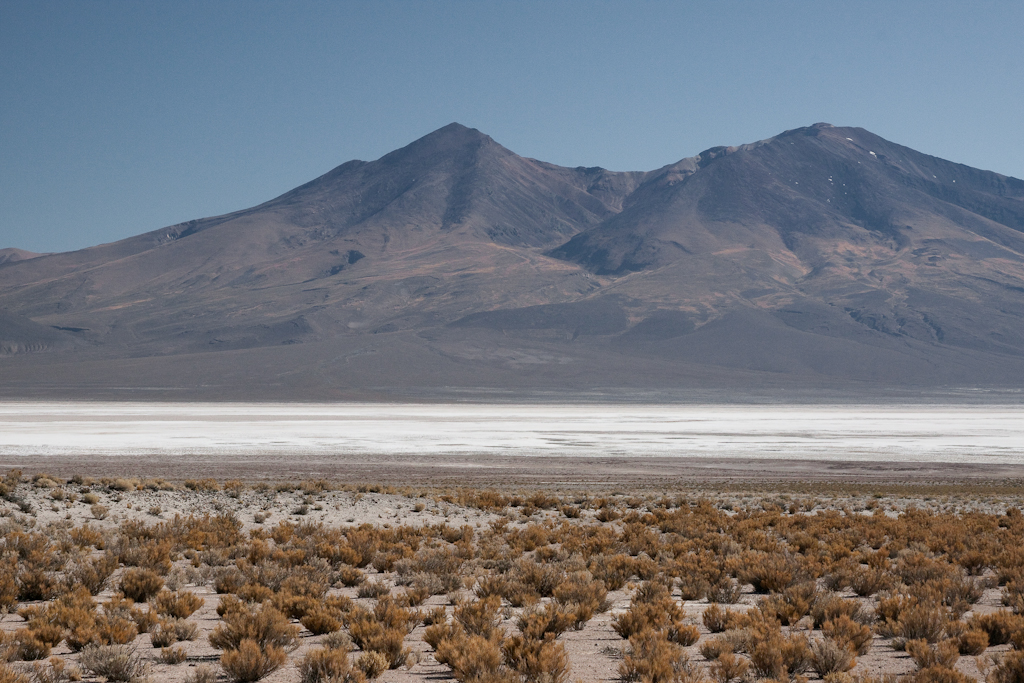
- The Chiwana salt flat with Luxar in the background

Highest point
- Elevation: 5,504 m (18,058 ft)
- Coordinates: 20°59′27″S 68°02′45″W

Geography
- Location within Bolivia
- Location: Bolivia; Potosí Department
- Parent range: Andes

Luxsar or Luxar (also spelled Llixar, Luxor) is a 5,504-metre-high (18,058 ft) mountain in Bolivia. It is located in the Potosí Department, Nor Lípez Province, Quemes Municipality. It lies north of the Chiwana salt flat (Salar de Chiguana).

== See also ==
- Pampa Luxsar
