= Tijtin =

Mountain in Bolivia

- Location within Bolivia

Highest point
- Elevation: 4,543 m (14,905 ft)
- Coordinates: 20°40′27″S 67°40′02″W

Geography
- Location: Bolivia, Potosí Department
- Parent range: Andes

Tijtin (Aymara tijti wart, -n a suffix) is a 4,543-metre-high (14,905 ft) mountain in the Bolivian Andes. It is situated in the Potosí Department, Nor Lípez Province, Colcha "K" Municipality. Tijtin lies south of the Uyuni salt flat, north-west of the mountains Qaral and Lliphi.
