= Millu Urqu =

Mountain in Bolivia

- Location within Bolivia

Highest point
- Elevation: 4,701 m (15,423 ft)
- Coordinates: 21°03′44″S 67°52′53″W

Geography
- Location: Bolivia, Potosí Department, Nor Lípez Province
- Parent range: Andes

Millu Urqu (Quechua millu salty, urqu mountain, "salty mountain", also spelled Millu Orkho) is a 4,701-metre-high (15,423 ft) mountain in the Andes of Bolivia. It is situated in the Potosí Department, Nor Lípez Province, Quemes Municipality. Millu Urqu lies southwest of Chakra Urqu and Kachi Unu and northwest of Chiwana.
