= Cerro Ascotan =

Mountain in Chile

- del Jardin
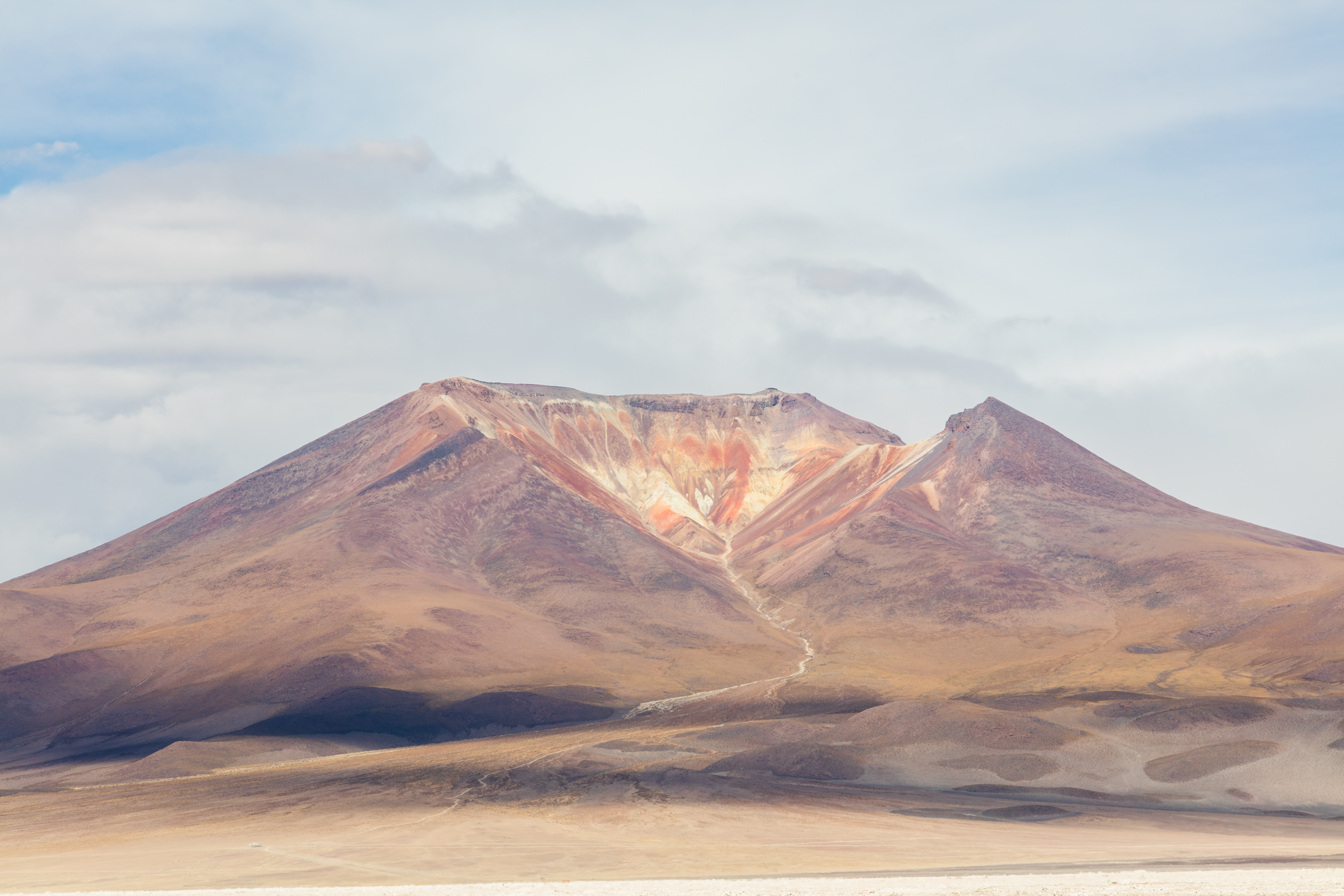
- Cerro Ascotan seen from Salar de Ascotán

Highest point
- Elevation: 5,473 m (17,956 ft)
- Coordinates: 21°41′S 68°07′W

Geography
- Location within Chile Location within Argentina
- Location: Chile / Bolivia

Geology
- Mountain type: Stratovolcano
- Last eruption: Pleistocene

Cerro Ascotan (also known as del Jardin) is a volcano on the border between Chile and Bolivia. It is 5,473 metres (17,956 ft) high, 1,770 metres (5,810 ft) above the terrain and a maximum slope in the summit area of 26°. A breach in the edifice is 1.9 kilometres (1.2 mi) wide and 3.4 kilometres (2.1 mi) long, with an azimuth of 252°. The current snowline lies between 5,700–5,900 metres (18,700–19,400 ft); during the Pleistocene it was lower at 4,900–5,000 metres (16,100–16,400 ft). The volcano's summit, about one third thereof, was removed by a large explosion, with debris thrown at large distances. Volcanic activity probably occurred during the Pleistocene. A mountain sanctuary has been found. The volcano is neighbor to Cerro Araral.
