= Colcha K =

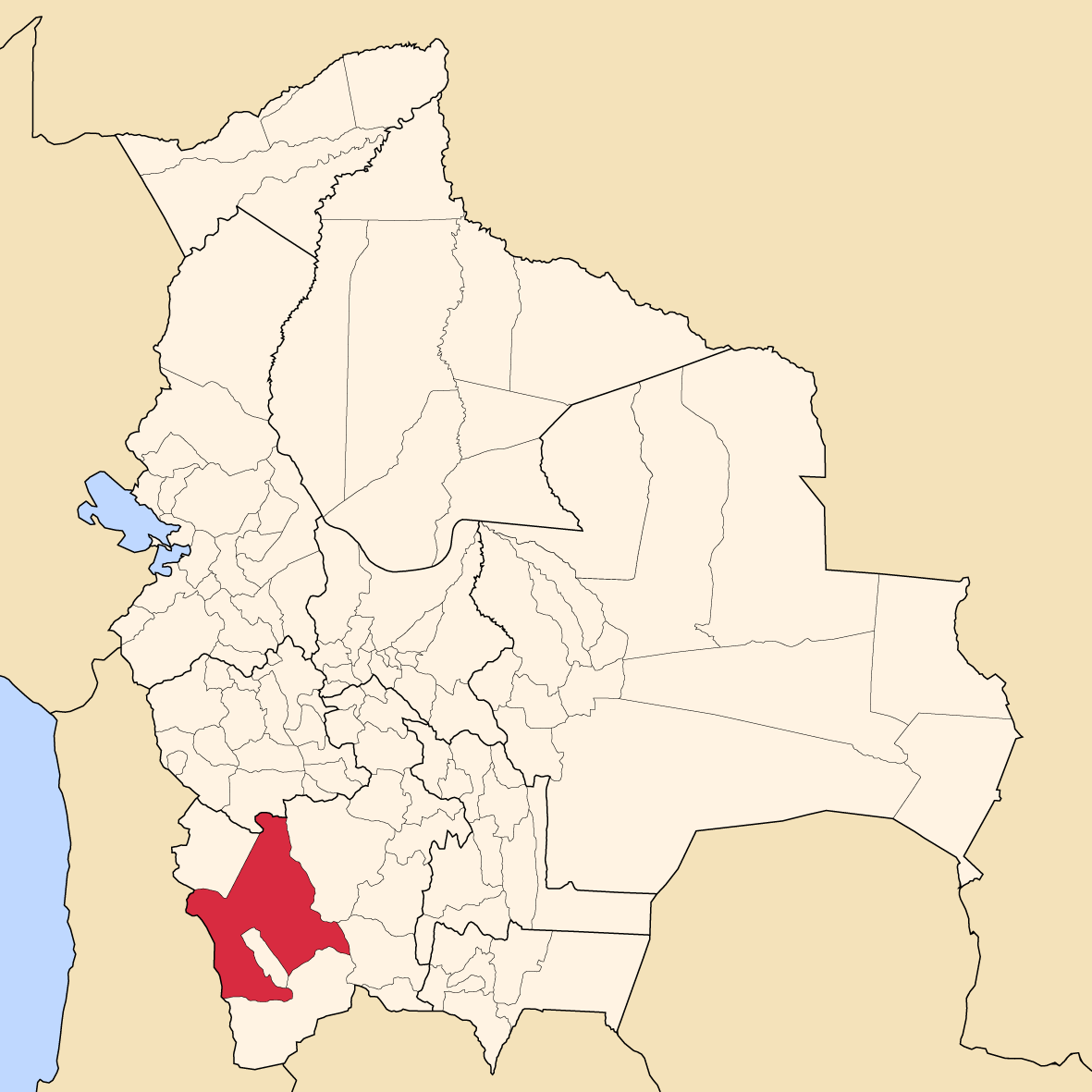
- Nor Lipez, Potosi

- Location in Bolivia
- Coordinates: 20°44′26″S 67°39′38″W
- Country: Bolivia
- Department: Potosí Department
- Province: Nor Lípez Province
- Municipality: Colcha "K" Municipality
- Canton: Colcha "K" Canton
- Elevation: 12,306 ft (3,751 m)

Population (2012)
  - Total: 1,221
- Time zone: UTC-4 (BOT)

Colcha K is a village serving as the capital of Nor Lípez Province, in the Potosí Department of Bolivia. It is also the capital of the Colcha "K" Canton and Colcha "K" Municipality.

== Climate ==
Climate data for Colcha K, elevation 3,780 m (12,400 ft), (1979–2012)
Month	Jan	Feb	Mar	Apr	May	Jun	Jul	Aug	Sep	Oct	Nov	Dec	Year
Record high °C (°F)	31.1 (88.0)	30.6 (87.1)	29.6 (85.3)	28.2 (82.8)	25.4 (77.7)	24.1 (75.4)	24.1 (75.4)	26.8 (80.2)	26.0 (78.8)	29.1 (84.4)	31.2 (88.2)	31.0 (87.8)	31.2 (88.2)
Mean daily maximum °C (°F)	22.5 (72.5)	21.9 (71.4)	22.3 (72.1)	21.2 (70.2)	17.7 (63.9)	15.6 (60.1)	15.3 (59.5)	17.4 (63.3)	19.0 (66.2)	21.4 (70.5)	22.9 (73.2)	23.7 (74.7)	20.1 (68.1)
Daily mean °C (°F)	13.9 (57.0)	13.3 (55.9)	13.1 (55.6)	11.2 (52.2)	7.6 (45.7)	5.6 (42.1)	5.4 (41.7)	7.3 (45.1)	9.0 (48.2)	11.2 (52.2)	12.7 (54.9)	14.0 (57.2)	10.4 (50.7)
Mean daily minimum °C (°F)	5.4 (41.7)	4.7 (40.5)	4.0 (39.2)	1.3 (34.3)	−2.5 (27.5)	−4.4 (24.1)	−4.4 (24.1)	−2.9 (26.8)	−1.0 (30.2)	0.9 (33.6)	2.6 (36.7)	4.3 (39.7)	0.7 (33.2)
Record low °C (°F)	−2.1 (28.2)	−1.5 (29.3)	−4.0 (24.8)	−7.2 (19.0)	−14.0 (6.8)	−12.4 (9.7)	−11.2 (11.8)	−11.0 (12.2)	−9.2 (15.4)	−6.1 (21.0)	−3.9 (25.0)	−2.5 (27.5)	−14.0 (6.8)
Average precipitation mm (inches)	84.8 (3.34)	49.0 (1.93)	23.1 (0.91)	2.8 (0.11)	0.8 (0.03)	0.5 (0.02)	1.0 (0.04)	0.8 (0.03)	0.2 (0.01)	1.0 (0.04)	2.0 (0.08)	21.5 (0.85)	187.5 (7.39)
Average precipitation days	10.3	6.3	4.7	0.7	0.6	0.2	0.3	0.2	0.2	0.4	0.6	3.5	28
Average relative humidity (%)	44.1	39.4	37.4	24.9	24.6	24.5	25.2	23.5	20.4	21.2	25.3	32.2	28.6
Source: Servicio Nacional de Meteorología e Hidrología de Bolivia
