= Río Grande de Lípez =

Location
- Country: Bolivia
- Region: Potosí Department

Physical characteristics
- Source
  - coordinates: 21°40′25″S 67°02′53″W
- Mouth: Uyuni salt flat
  - coordinates: 20°38′44″S 67°17′30″W
- Length: 153 km (95 mi)

The Río Grande de Lípez is a river in Nor Lípez Province, Potosí Department, Bolivia.

== See also ==
- Puka Mayu
- List of rivers of Bolivia
