= Puka Mayu =

Puka Mayu of Pukamayu (Quechua for "red river") may refer to:

- Pukamayu (Peru), a river in Peru
- Puka Mayu (Cochabamba), a river in the Cochabamba Department, Bolivia
- Puka Mayu (Potosí), a river in the Potosí Department, Bolivia
