= Pelcoya Canton =

Pelcoya
- Canton
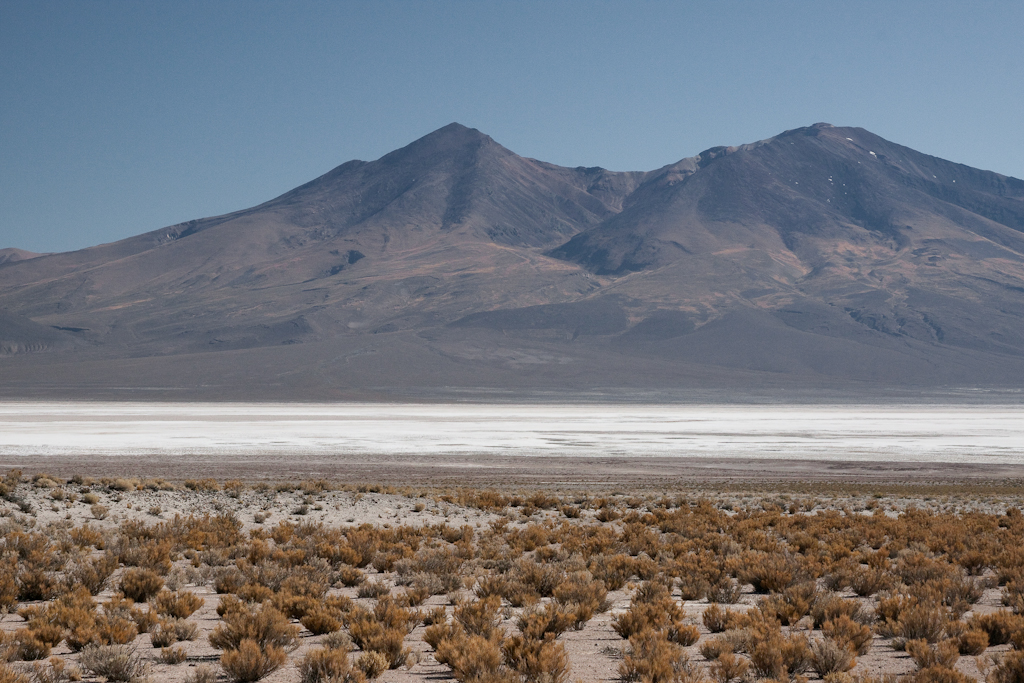
- Chiguana salt lake (Salar de Chiguana) in the Pelcoya and Chiguana Cantons

- Location of Pelcoya within Bolivia
- Coordinates: 20°57′S 68°2′W
- Country: Bolivia
- Department: Potosí Department
- Province: Nor Lípez Province
- Municipality: San Pedro de Quemes Municipality
- Seat: Pelcoya

Population (2001)
  - Total: 135
- Time zone: UTC-4 (BST)

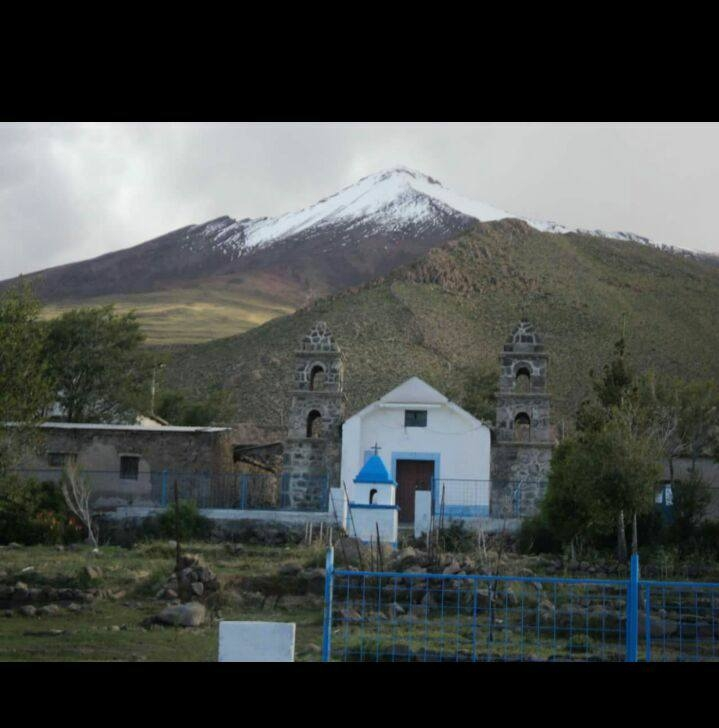
la iglesia

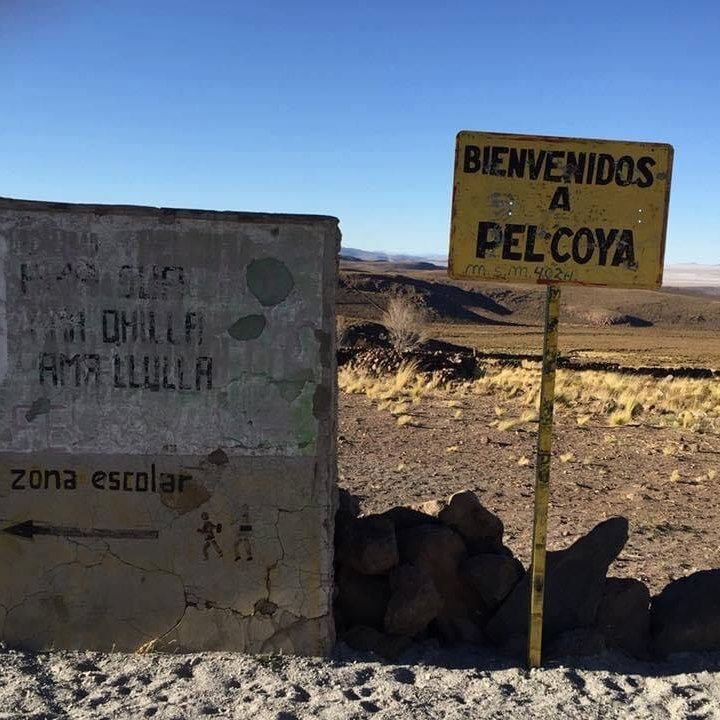
bienvenido a pelcoya

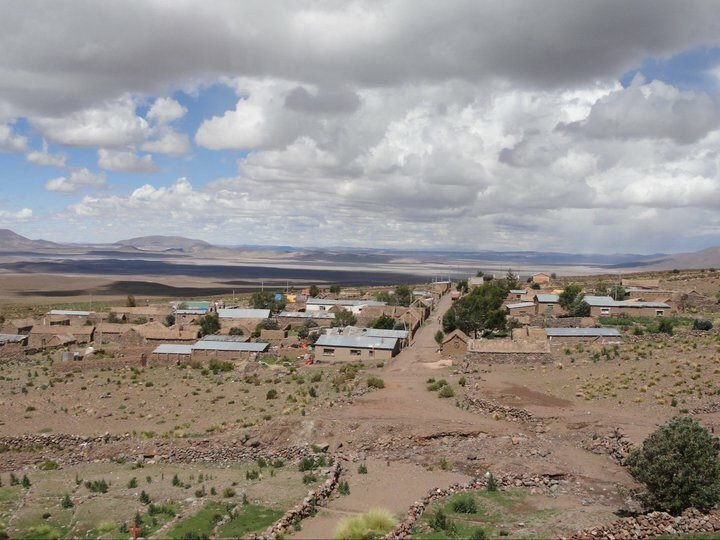
pelcoya

Pelcoya is one of the cantons of the San Pedro de Quemes Municipality, the second municipal section of the Nor Lípez Province in the Potosí Department of Bolivia. During the census of 2001 it had 135 inhabitants. Its seat is Pelcoya with a population of 79 in 2001.
