= San Agustín, Bolivia =

San Agustín
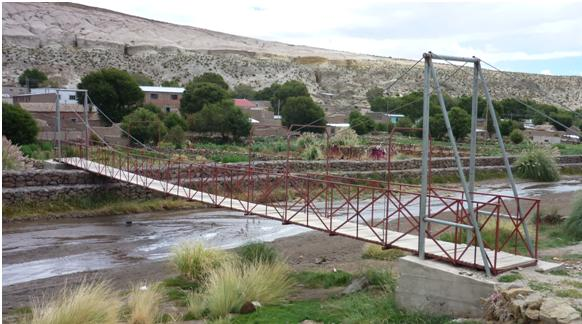

- Location in Bolivia
- Coordinates: 21°9′19″S 67°40′47″W
- Country: Bolivia
- Department: Potosí Department
- Province: Enrique Baldivieso Province
- Municipality: San Agustín Municipality
- Canton: San Agustín Canton
- Elevation: 12,589 ft (3,837 m)

Population (2012)
  - Total: 639
- Time zone: UTC-4 (BOT)

San Agustín is a village located in the Potosí Department of Bolivia. It is the capital of the San Agustín Canton, San Agustín Municipality and Enrique Baldivieso Province.

== Climate ==
Climate data for San Agustín, elevation 4,230 m (13,880 ft), (1993–2014)
Month	Jan	Feb	Mar	Apr	May	Jun	Jul	Aug	Sep	Oct	Nov	Dec	Year
Record high °C (°F)	29.0 (84.2)	28.6 (83.5)	28.8 (83.8)	27.1 (80.8)	26.3 (79.3)	22.4 (72.3)	22.0 (71.6)	23.9 (75.0)	24.0 (75.2)	29.0 (84.2)	27.5 (81.5)	29.0 (84.2)	29.0 (84.2)
Mean daily maximum °C (°F)	21.2 (70.2)	20.5 (68.9)	21.0 (69.8)	19.6 (67.3)	16.4 (61.5)	14.8 (58.6)	13.3 (55.9)	15.5 (59.9)	17.6 (63.7)	19.4 (66.9)	20.4 (68.7)	21.6 (70.9)	18.4 (65.2)
Daily mean °C (°F)	12.3 (54.1)	11.5 (52.7)	11.0 (51.8)	8.8 (47.8)	4.9 (40.8)	3.1 (37.6)	2.2 (36.0)	4.0 (39.2)	7.0 (44.6)	8.3 (46.9)	9.7 (49.5)	12.0 (53.6)	7.9 (46.2)
Mean daily minimum °C (°F)	3.4 (38.1)	2.5 (36.5)	1.0 (33.8)	−2.0 (28.4)	−6.6 (20.1)	−8.7 (16.3)	−9.0 (15.8)	−7.5 (18.5)	−3.7 (25.3)	−2.7 (27.1)	−1.0 (30.2)	2.4 (36.3)	−2.7 (27.2)
Record low °C (°F)	−9.0 (15.8)	−7.6 (18.3)	−8.0 (17.6)	−11.0 (12.2)	−18.7 (−1.7)	−17.4 (0.7)	−18.4 (−1.1)	−18.2 (−0.8)	−15.0 (5.0)	−13.7 (7.3)	−14.4 (6.1)	−9.9 (14.2)	−18.7 (−1.7)
Average precipitation mm (inches)	56.6 (2.23)	68.7 (2.70)	20.0 (0.79)	2.9 (0.11)	0.4 (0.02)	0.9 (0.04)	0.7 (0.03)	1.2 (0.05)	0.3 (0.01)	0.6 (0.02)	2.1 (0.08)	2.0 (0.08)	156.4 (6.16)
Average precipitation days	8.9	9.7	3.6	0.5	0.1	0.1	0.2	0.2	0.1	0.0	0.4	2.5	26.3
Average relative humidity (%)	77.3	75.4	75.3	73.8	72.8	70.3	71.4	72.9	70.7	69.7	70.8	71.7	72.7
Source: Servicio Nacional de Meteorología e Hidrología de Bolivia
