= Patilla =

Mountain in Bolivia

- Location within Bolivia

Highest point
- Coordinates: 20°50′58″S 68°32′57″W

Geography
- Location: Bolivia, Potosí Department, Nor Lípez Province, Chile, Antofagasta Region, El Loa Province
- Parent range: Andes

Patilla is a mountain in the Andes on the border of Bolivia and Chile. On the Bolivian side it is located in the Potosí Department, Nor Lípez Province, Quemes Municipality, Cana Canton. On the Chilean side it lies in the Antofagasta Region, El Loa Province. Patilla lies is situated south of the volcano Iru Phutunqu and north of the mountain Kuntur Umu.
