= San Pedro de Quemes Municipality =

San Pedro de Quemes
- Municipality
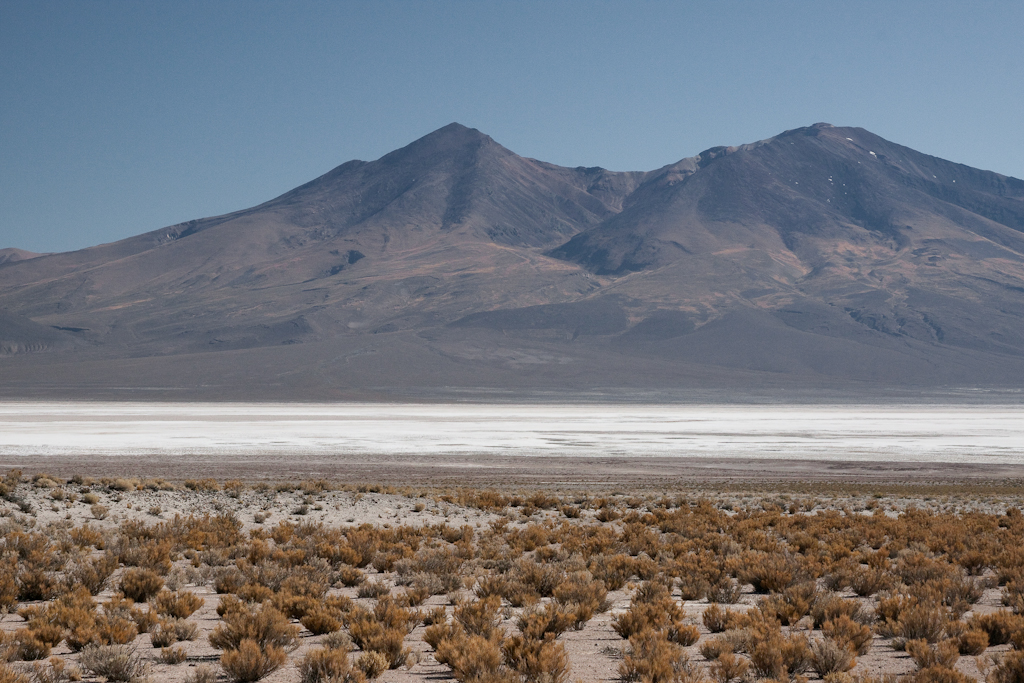
- Salar de Chiguana

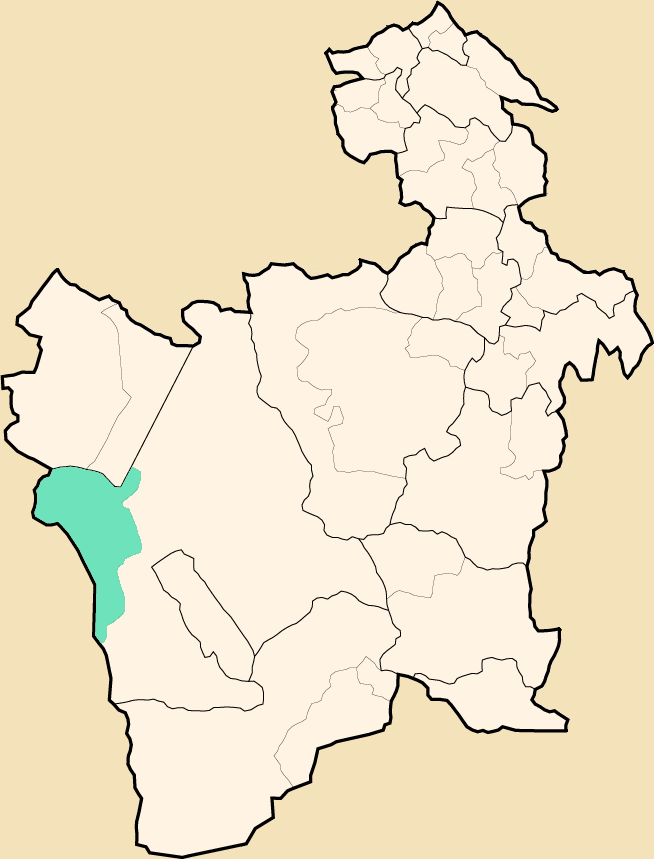
- Location within Potosí Department

- Location within Bolivia
- Coordinates: 21°3′S 68°18′W
- Country: Bolivia
- Department: Potosí Department
- Province: Nor Lípez Province
- Seat: San Pedro de Quemes

Area
  - Total: 1,657 sq mi (4,291 km^{2})
- Elevation: 13,000 ft (4,000 m)

Population (2001)
  - Total: 815
  - Ethnicities: Quechua
- Time zone: UTC-4 (BOT)

San Pedro de Quemes (Quechua: Qimis) is the second municipal section of the Nor Lípez Province in the Potosí Department in Bolivia. Its seat is San Pedro de Quemes.

== Geography ==
The municipality lies at the Uyuni salt flat.

Some of the highest mountains of the municipality are listed below:

- Araral
- Chiwana
- Ch'aska Urqu
- Iru Phutunqu
- Julina
- Kachi Unu
- K'uchu Unu
- Luxsar
- Michincha
- Millu Urqu
- Paruma
- Patilla
- Phuruncha
- Q'aluta Wintu Luma
- Sarapuru
- Tankani
- Tirani
- Ukilla
- Ullawi
- Ullqa
- Wanaku
- Yarita

Many of the mountains and volcanoes are a natural border to Chile.

== Subdivision ==
The municipality consists of the following cantons:

- Cana - 44 inhabitants (2001)
- Chiguana - 10 inhabitants
- Pajancha - 52 inhabitants
- Pelcoya - 135 inhabitants
- San Pedro de Quemes- 574 inhabitants

== The people ==
The people are mainly not indigenous and 45,0% are citizens of Quechua descent.

Ethnic group	%
Quechua	45.0
Aymara	6.3
Guaraní, Chiquitos, Moxos	0.2
Not indigenous	48.3
Other indigenous groups	0.2

== See also ==
- Ch'iyar Quta
