= Enrique Baldivieso Province =

Enrique Baldivieso
- Province
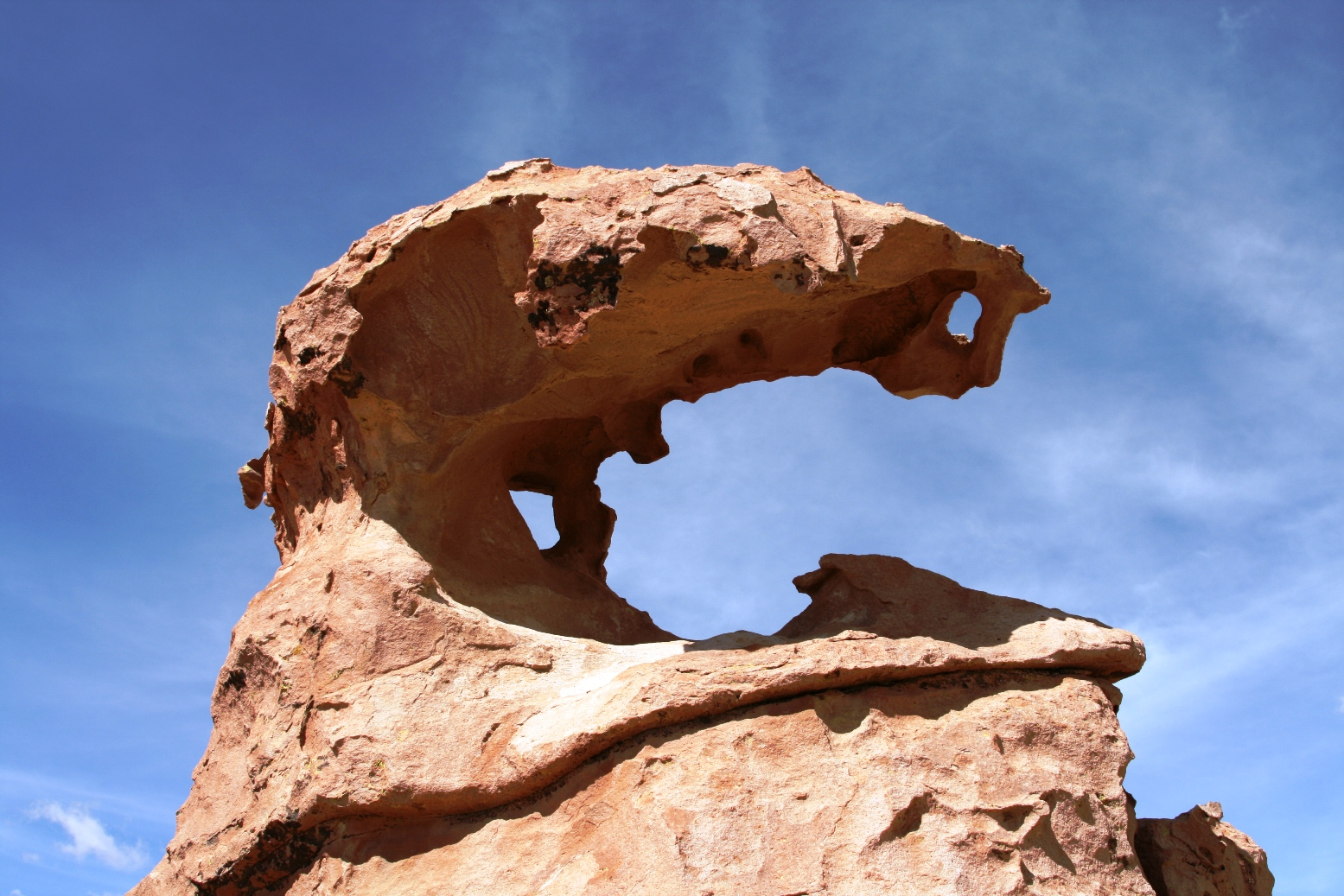
- Valle de las Rocas (Rock Valley) in Enrique Baldivieso Province

- Flag Seal

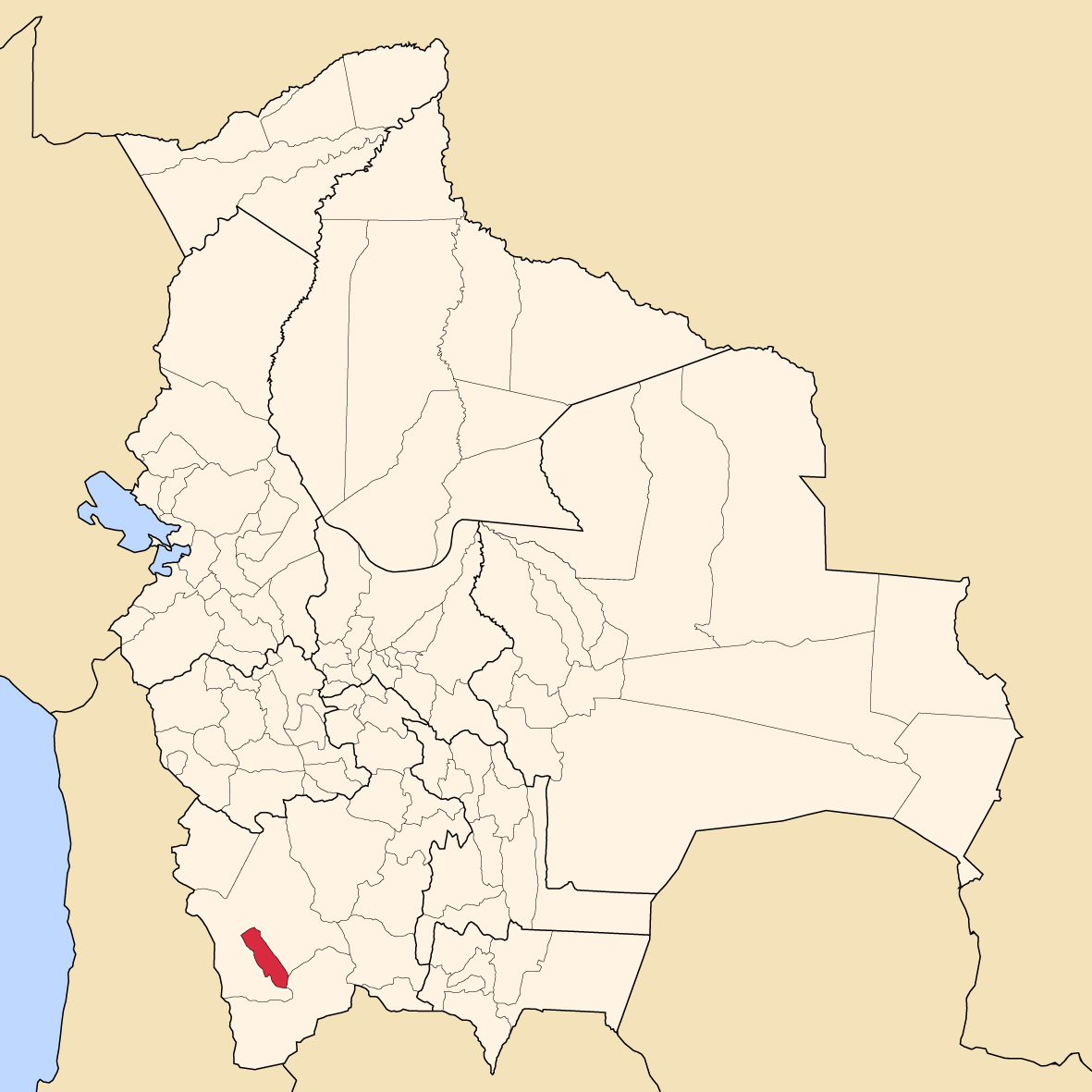
- Location of the Enrique Baldivieso Province or San Agustín Municipality within Bolivia

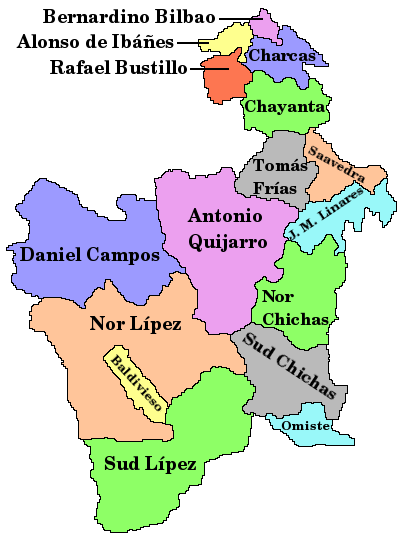
- Provinces of the Potosí Department
- Coordinates: 21°9′0″S 67°40′0″W
- Country: Bolivia
- Department: Potosí Department
- Capital: San Agustín

Area
  - Total: 870 sq mi (2,254 km^{2})

Population (2024 census)
  - Total: 2,119
  - Density: 2.435/sq mi (0.9401/km^{2})
  - Ethnicities: Quechua
- Time zone: UTC-4 (BOT)
- Area code: BO.PO.EV

Enrique Baldivieso (or: Enrique Valdivieso) is a province in the Bolivian department of Potosí. It is named after the former vice president Enrique Baldivieso. Its seat is San Agustín with a population of 533 during the census of 2001 situated on the bank of the Turuncha River in San Agustín Canton.

== Location ==
Enrique Baldivieso province is one of sixteen provinces in the Potosí Department. It is located between 21° 03' and 21° 51' South and between 67° 07' and 67° 48' West. In the east, north, west and south it is almost completely encircled by the Nor Lípez Province, only in the southeast it is bordered by the Sur Lípez Province for 20 km.

The province extends over 120 km from northwest to southeast at an average width of 35 km.

== Division ==
The province comprises only one municipality, San Agustín Municipality. It is identical to Enrique Baldivieso Province. The province is subdivided into four cantons:

- Alota - 533 inhabitants (2001)
- Cerro Gordo - 292 inhabitants
- San Agustín - 567 inhabitants
- Todos Santos - 248 inhabitants

== Population ==
The main language is Quechua, spoken by 96%, while 86% of the population speak Spanish. The population rose from 1,313 inhabitants (1992 census) to 1,640 (2001 census), an increase of 25%. 46.5% of the population are younger than 15 years old.

99.7% of the population have no access to electricity, 99% have no sanitary facilities. 72% of the population are employed in agriculture, 28% in general services. 95% of the population are Catholic, 2% Protestant.

== Places of interest ==
- Valle de las Rocas (Rock Valley)
- Turuncha River and Lake Turuncha in San Agustín Canton
