= Kachi Unu =

Mountain in Bolivia

- Location within Bolivia

Highest point
- Elevation: 4,641 m (15,226 ft)
- Coordinates: 21°2′34″S 67°52′13″W

Geography
- Location: Bolivia, Potosí Department, Nor Lípez Province
- Parent range: Andes

Kachi Unu (Quechua kachi salt, unu, yaku water, "salt water", Hispanicized spelling Cachi Unu) is a 4,641-metre-high (15,226 ft) mountain in the Andes of Bolivia. It is situated in the Potosí Department, Nor Lípez Province, Colcha "K" Municipality, San Juan Canton, and in the Quemes Municipality, Chiguana Canton. Kachi Unu lies northwest of Chiwana and Chakra Urqu and northeast of Tomasamil and Millu Urqu.
