= Chakra Urqu =

Mountain in Bolivia

- Location within Bolivia

Highest point
- Elevation: 4,347 m (14,262 ft)
- Coordinates: 21°03′31″S 67°50′32″W

Geography
- Location: Bolivia, Potosí Department, Nor Lípez Province
- Parent range: Andes

Chakra Urqu Quechua chakra field, urqu mountain, "field mountain", also spelled Chajra Orkho) or Ch'aqra Urqu (Quechua ch'aqra ford, "ford mountain") is a 4,347-metre-high (14,262 ft) mountain in the Andes of Bolivia. It is situated in the Potosí Department, Nor Lípez Province, Colcha "K" Municipality. Chakra Urqu lies northeast of the mountains Chiwana and Millu Urqu and southeast of Kachi Unu.
