= Laqaya =

Archaeological site in Bolivia

- Location within Bolivia
- 20°48′56″S 67°42′32″W
- Location: Bolivia, Potosí Department, Nor Lípez Province, Colcha "K" Municipality
- Region: Altiplano

Laqaya (Aymara for ruins of a building) is an archaeological site in the Altiplano of Bolivia. It is situated in the Potosí Department, Nor Lípez Province, Colcha "K" Municipality. The site was declared a National Archaeological Monument by Supreme Decrete 27607 on July 2, 2004.
