= Turuncha River =

Turuncha
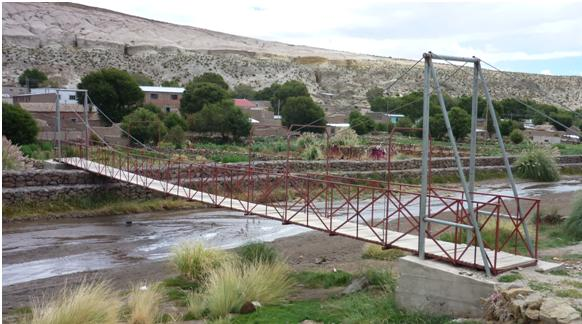
- San Agustín and Turuncha River

Location
- Country: Bolivia
- Region: Potosí Department
- Municipality: Enrique Baldivieso Province

Turuncha River is a Bolivian river in the Potosí Department, Agustín Municipality (which is identical to the Enrique Baldivieso Province), San Agustín Canton. It flows along the little town San Agustín, the capital of the province.

== See also ==
- List of rivers of Bolivia
