= Qaral =

Mountain in Bolivia

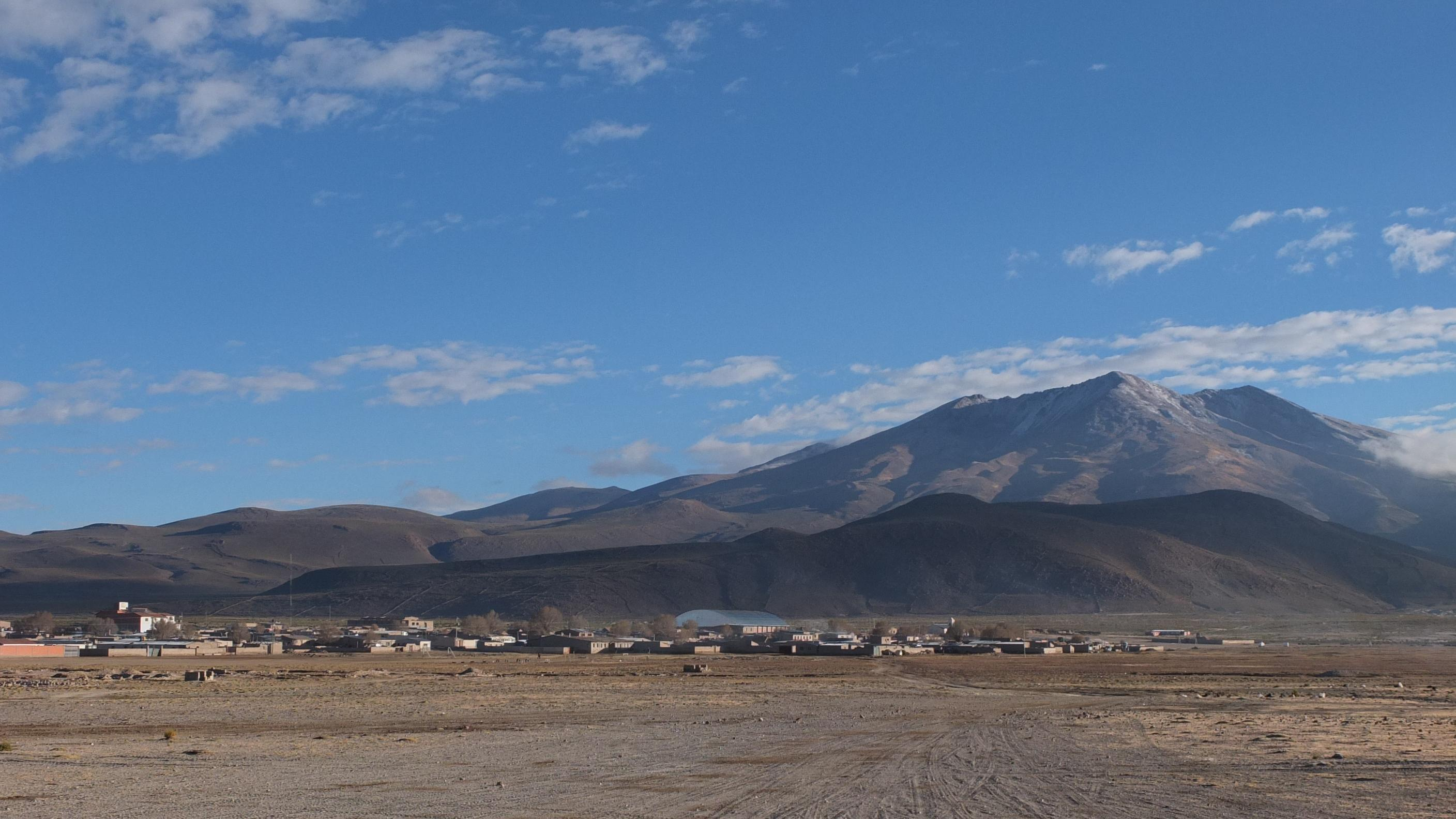
- Qaral as seen from the village of San Juan

Highest point
- Elevation: 4,988 m (16,365 ft)
- Coordinates: 20°49′07″S 67°46′53″W

Geography
- Location within Bolivia
- Location: Bolivia, Potosí Department
- Parent range: Andes

Qaral (Hispanicized spelling Caral, also spelled Karal, Kjaral, K'aral) is a 4,988-metre-high (16,365 ft) mountain in the Bolivian Andes. It is situated in the Potosí Department, Nor Lípez Province, Colcha "K" Municipality. Qaral lies south of the Uyuni salt flat, south-west of the mountain Lliphi. Some of the nearest villages are Santiago and San Juan (San Juan del Rosario). An intermittent stream named Urqu Sunqu (Quechua for mountain heart, Orkho Sonkho) originates at the mountain. It flows to the south-west.
