= Chiwana =

Mountain in Bolivia

- Location within Bolivia

Highest point
- Elevation: 5,301 m (17,392 ft)
- Coordinates: 21°06′14″S 67°51′52″W

Geography
- Location: Bolivia; Potosí Department
- Parent range: Andes

Chiwana (Quechua chiway mating of birds, -na a suffix, "where the birds mate", Hispanicized spelling Chiguana) is a 5,301-metre-high (17,392 ft) mountain in Bolivia. It is located in the Potosí Department, on the border of the Nor Lípez Province, Colcha "K" Municipality, and the Quemes Municipality. The mountain lies at the Chiwana salt flat (Salar de Chiguana).

== See also ==
- Kachi Unu
