= San Pedro de Quemes Canton =

San Pedro de Quemes
- Canton
- Location of San Pedro de Quemes within Bolivia
- Coordinates: 20°45′S 68°3′W
- Country: Bolivia
- Department: Potosí Department
- Province: Nor Lípez Province
- Municipality: San Pedro de Quemes Municipality
- Seat: San Pedro de Quemes
- Elevation: 12,090 ft (3,685 m)

Population (2001)
  - Total: 574
- Time zone: UTC-4 (BOT)

San Pedro de Quemes is one of the cantons of the San Pedro de Quemes Municipality, the second municipal section of the Nor Lípez Province in the Potosí Department of Bolivia. During the census of 2001 it had 574 inhabitants. Its seat is San Pedro de Quemes with a population of 490 in 2001.
