= Puka Mayu (Potosí) =

- Etymology: Quechua

Location
- Country: Bolivia
- Region: Potosí Department

Physical characteristics
- Source
  - location: Cordillera de Lípez
- Mouth: Uyuni salt flat
  - location: Colcha "K" Municipality
  - coordinates: 20°25′S 66°58′W
  - elevation: 3,653 m (11,985 ft)

Puka Mayu (Quechua puka red, mayu river, "red river") is a Bolivian river in the Potosí Department, Nor Lípez Province, Colcha "K" Municipality. It originates in the Cordillera de Lípez and empties into the Uyuni salt flat. The mouth lies west and south west of the town Uyuni and north east of the mouth of the Río Grande de Lípez.
