= Alota Canton =

Alota
- Canton
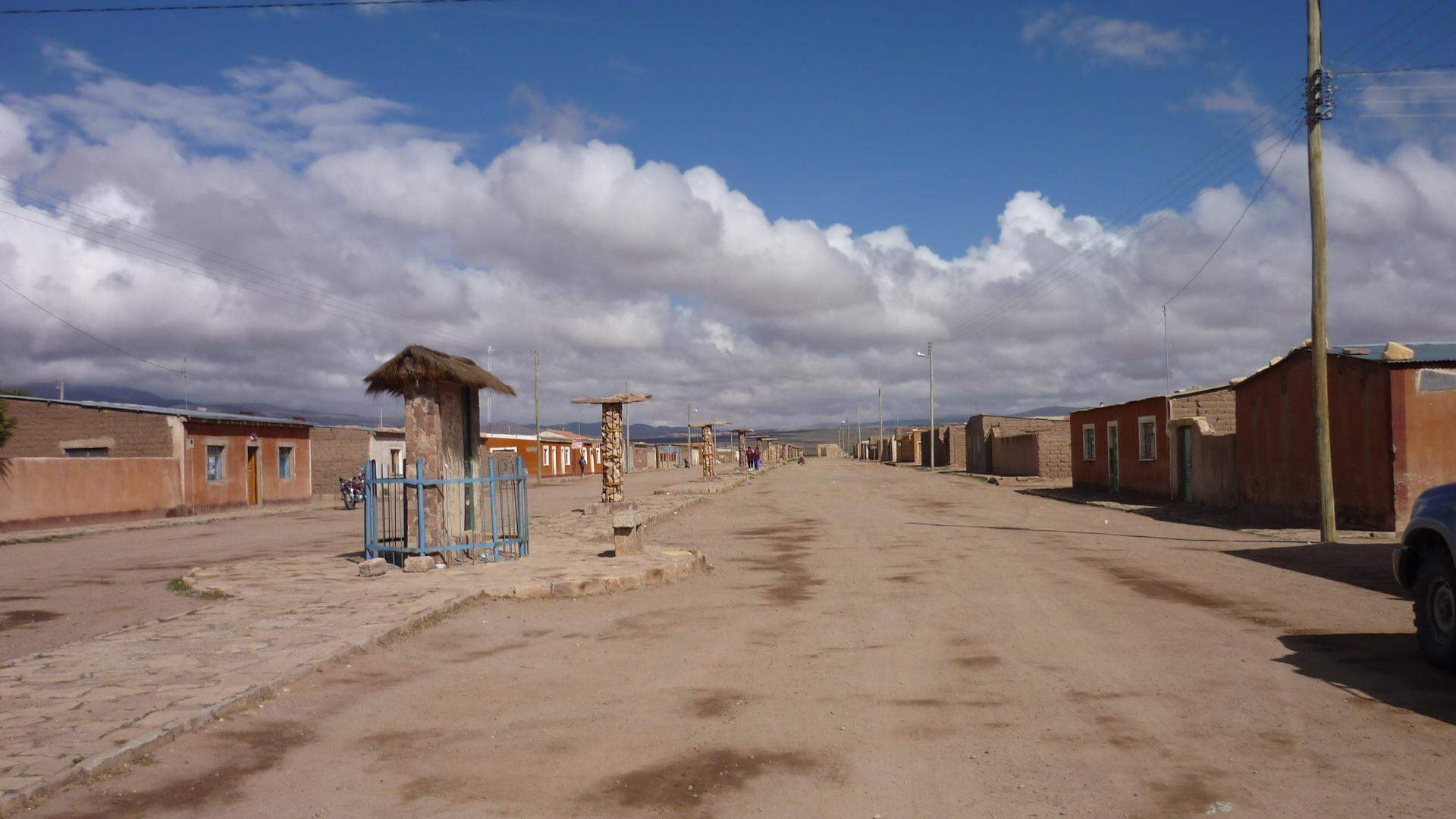

- Location of Alota within Bolivia
- Coordinates: 21°24′S 67°36′W
- Country: Bolivia
- Department: Potosí Department
- Province: Enrique Baldivieso Province
- Municipality: San Agustín Municipality
- Seat: Alota

Population (2001)
  - Total: 533
- Time zone: UTC-4 (BST)

Alota is one of the cantons of the Enrique Baldivieso Province (or "San Agustín Municipality") in the Potosí Department in south-west Bolivia. During the census of 2001 it had 533 inhabitants. Its seat is Alota with a population of 515 in 2001.
