= San Agustín Canton =

- Canton
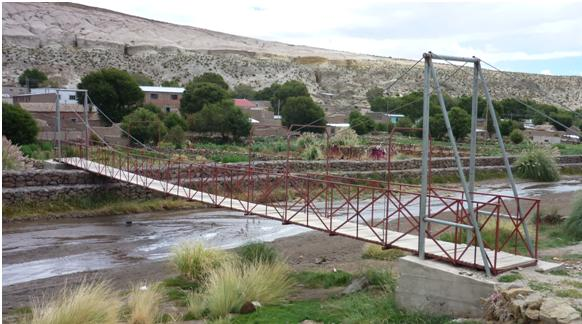
- San Agustín

- Location of San Agustín within Bolivia
- Coordinates: 21°9′0″S 67°41′0″W
- Country: Bolivia
- Department: Potosí Department
- Province: Enrique Baldivieso Province
- Municipality: San Agustín Municipality
- Seat: San Agustín
- Elevation: 12,589 ft (3,837 m)

Population (2001)
  - Total: 567
  - Ethnicities: Quechua

San Agustín Canton is one of the cantons of the Enrique Baldivieso Province (or "San Agustín Municipality") in the Potosí Department in south-west Bolivia. During the census of 2001 it had 567 inhabitants. Its seat is San Agustín which is also the capital of the Enrique Baldivieso Province with a population of 533 in 2001. It lies at the Turuncha River.
