= Pastos Grandes Lake =

Lake in the Pastos Grandes caldera in the Potosí Department, Bolivia

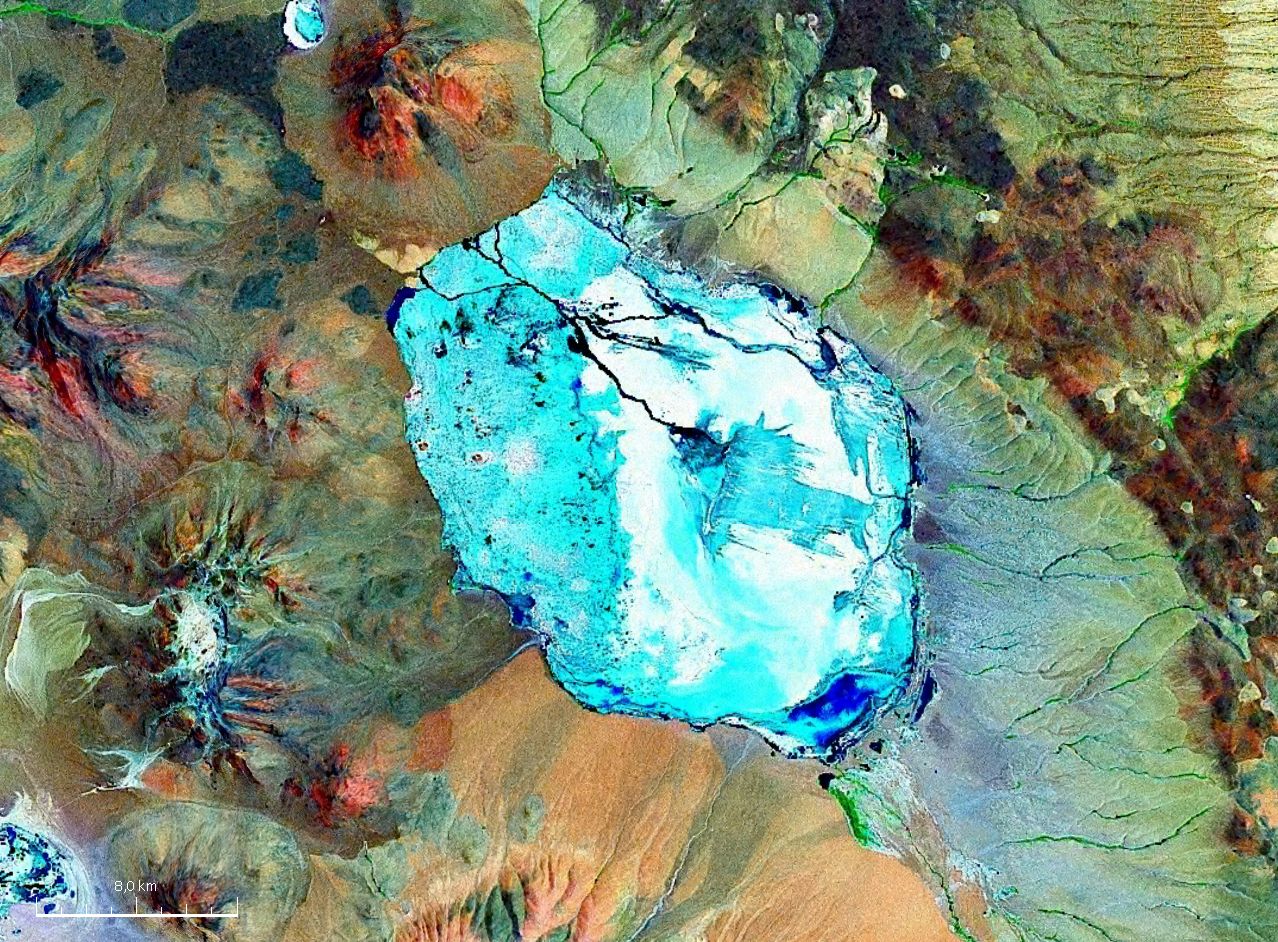

- Location within Bolivia Location within South America
- Interactive map of Pastos Grandes Lake
- Location: Potosí Department
- Coordinates: 21°38′22″S 67°48′00″W
- Primary outflows: evaporation
- Basin countries: Bolivia
- Surface area: 120 km^{2} (46 sq mi)
- Surface elevation: 4,330 m (14,210 ft)
- Islands: none

Pastos Grandes Lake is a lake in the Pastos Grandes caldera in the Potosí Department, Bolivia. At an elevation of 4,430 metres (14,530 ft), its surface area is 120 square kilometres (46 sq mi).

== Lake ==
At an elevation of 4,430 metres (14,530 ft), Pastos Grandes contains a lake basin north of Cerro Pastos Grandes, which is 10 kilometres (6.2 mi) wide and covers a surface area of about 100 square kilometres (39 sq mi)-120 square kilometres (46 sq mi) at an elevation of 4,400 metres (14,400 ft). It only covers a fraction of the area of Pastos Grandes caldera and is probably a remnant of a once-larger lake that filled the moat of the caldera. Earlier lacustrine episodes left a layer of beige mud behind. This mud freezes during the winter months to a certain depth and cryoturbation has formed polygonal structures as well as large cracks in the crust on its surface.

Surfaces of open water are concentrated on the eastern edge of the salt pan, in its very centre and isolated areas on the western side, these all form an intricated network of interconnected ponds especially in the western half of the salt pan. One of these open water surfaces on the western side of the lake basin is known as Laguna Caliente, while another square-shaped lake in the southern part of the caldera is known as Laguna Khara. Sometimes after heavy precipitation, these open water surfaces can join into a ring lake around the centre.

Intermittent streams drain the catchment of Pastos Grandes and reach the salt pan; the longest flow through the southeastern parts of the catchment. The entire drainage basin of the lake has a surface area of 655 square kilometres (253 sq mi)-660 square kilometres (250 sq mi) and is delimited to the west and east by rhyolitic ridges. Apart from surface streams, springs contribute to the water budget of Pastos Grandes. Hot springs are active or were recently active on the western side of the salt pan and bear names such as La Salsa, La Rumba and El Ojo Verde, where temperatures of 20–75 °C (68–167 °F) have been measured. On the western shore, colder springs predominate. The heat appears to originate from a 200–250 °C (392–482 °F) hot reservoir.

Salts found within the salt pan include gypsum, halite and ulexite. The brines are rich in boron, lithium and sodium chloride, the salt pan has been considered a potential site for lithium and potassium mining. Salt contents range 144–371 grams per litre (0.0052–0.0134 lb/cu in). The salt chemistry is strongly influenced by the climate; the precipitation of mirabilite due to cold and evaporation of water cause changes in the composition of the waters.

Unique among most other salars of the Andes, Pastos Grandes features a c. 40 square kilometres (15 sq mi) carbonate platform with numerous fabrics of carbonate deposition. It is unclear what drives its formation as the climate at Pastos Grandes is similar to that of other salt lakes without such platforms but it may be a consequence of carbon dioxide degassing under the salar. At numerous points, calcite pisoliths are found at Pastos Grandes, usually associated with active or former springs. Rimstone dams and sinter terraces are also encountered close to inactive springs. All these cave formations encountered at Pastos Grandes are caused by the precipitation of calcite from oversaturated waters at the surface. What drives the loss of carbon dioxide and thus the oversaturation is not clear but may involve photosynthesis by algae.

Algae and diatoms grow within the open waters in Pastos Grandes, the diatoms being represented by oligohaline species such as some Fragilaria and Navicularia species. Different water surfaces are dominated by different diatom species, distinctions that are only partly mediated by different salinities. Animal species found within the lakes include amphipods, elmids and leeches in freshwater and by Cricotopus in saltwater. Additional animals are Euplanaria dorotocephala, Chironomidae, Corixidae, Cyclopoida, Ephydridae, Harpacticoida, Orchestidae, Ostracoda and Tipulidae species. Similar but different animal species have been found in other local lakes, indicating that they are largely separate systems. The animal flora of such Altiplano lakes is not very diverse, probably due to their relative youth and the harsh and often highly variable climates of the past in the region.

Pastos Grandes is one of many endorheic lakes that cover the region. The neighbouring Altiplano was formerly covered by lakes as well during the Pleistocene. After they dried up, the Salar de Uyuni and Salar de Coipasa were left behind.

== See also ==
- Pastos Grandes
- Chullunkhäni
- Ch'iyar Quta
