= Laguna Hedionda (Nor Lípez) =

Saline lake in the Nor Lípez Province, Potosí Department, Bolivia

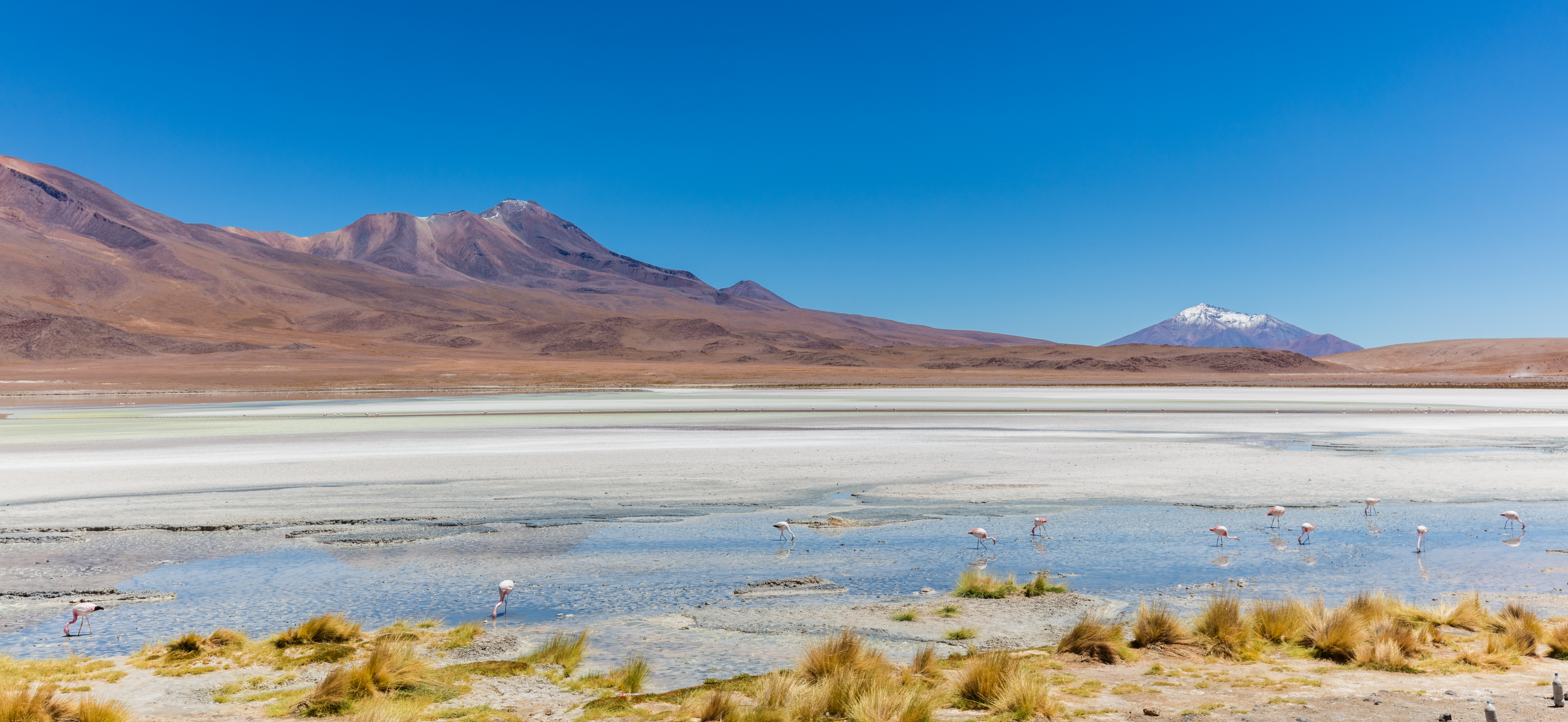
- Laguna Hedionda

- Location within Bolivia Location within South America
- Interactive map of Laguna Hedionda
- Location: Nor Lípez Province, Potosí Department
- Coordinates: 21.5667°S 68.05°W
- Type: Andean endorheic
- Basin countries: Bolivia
- Surface area: 3 km^{2} (1.2 sq mi)
- Average depth: 0.3 m (0.98 ft) mean depth
- Surface elevation: 4,121 m (13,520 ft)
- Frozen: Yes

Laguna Hedionda (Spanish for "stinking lake") is a saline lake in the Nor Lípez Province, Potosí Department in Bolivia. It is notable for various migratory species of pink and white flamingos.

Laguna Hedionda is one of the nine small saline lakes in the Andean Altiplano. It lies at an altitude of 4,121 metres (13,520 ft), with an area of 3 square kilometres (1.2 sq mi). Salt flats and bofedales (wetlands) are spread over the periphery of the lake. It is in a very remote area where human habitation is negligible. However, llamas and alpacas are seen grazing in the area.

== Geography ==
Laguna Hedionda is located in the Cordillera Occidental area of the Bolivian Altiplano of the central Andes, which is a volcanic landscape where many small closed lake basins have been noted. The central Andes of Bolivia has two other major basins, also running in a north–south direction, namely the freshwater Lake Titicaca basin and the Poopó and the Coipasa-Uyuni basins with shallow saline lakes and/or a salt crusts.

Specifically, the catchment of Laguna Hedionda borders with Chile and Argentina. It is located just north of lake Ch'iyar Quta in the central Andes Mountains at an elevation of 4,121 metres (13,520 ft). There are several mountains within 44 kilometres (27 mi) including Michincha, Cerro Volcanes, Cerro de Pajonal, Cerro de Tatio, Pabellón and Tocorpuri.

Laguna Hedionda has a water surface area of 3 square kilometres (1.2 sq mi). It is one of the four blue lakes that are seen on the way from the southern road that leads through Ollagüe volcano (elevation 5,865 metres (19,242 ft)), the only active volcano in Bolivia; the other three lakes are Cañapa, Ramaditas and Ch'iyar Quta. All the lakes are sourced by springs and have high sulphur content. The peripheral area of the lake is strewn with black volcanic rocks. Coal deposits are found near the lake. The catchment area of the lake is primarily covered with semi-desert steppe and dwarf scrub. Access to the lake is from San Juan via Chiguana which is a rail head and military post.

== Features ==
Diatom studies were carried out in the lake basins of the central Andes, which included the lake in the Lípez area, to determine the past lacustrine depth based on basin morphology, stratigraphy, sediment samples, altitude and diatom ecology. From these studies, it has been inferred that the hydrology of the closed basins of the Lípez (including several lakes such as Laguna Hedionda, Cañapa, Ch'iyar Quta, Honda, Pujito, Ramaditas and Ballivian) have a direct relationship with the regional climatic conditions since their catchment area is small compared to other lakes in the Coipasa-Uyuni basin. These are shallow lakes and their chemistry and diatom flora are well assessed.

The lake water has a high salinity level of 66–80% and therefore is rich in invertebrate zooplankton and benthos, such as Artemia. A survey carried out in 1979 described the presence of Artemia salina, nematodes and harpacticoids.

The lake has mineral deposits of thenardite and ulexite, gypsum, lithium, boron and potassium, among others.

== Fauna ==
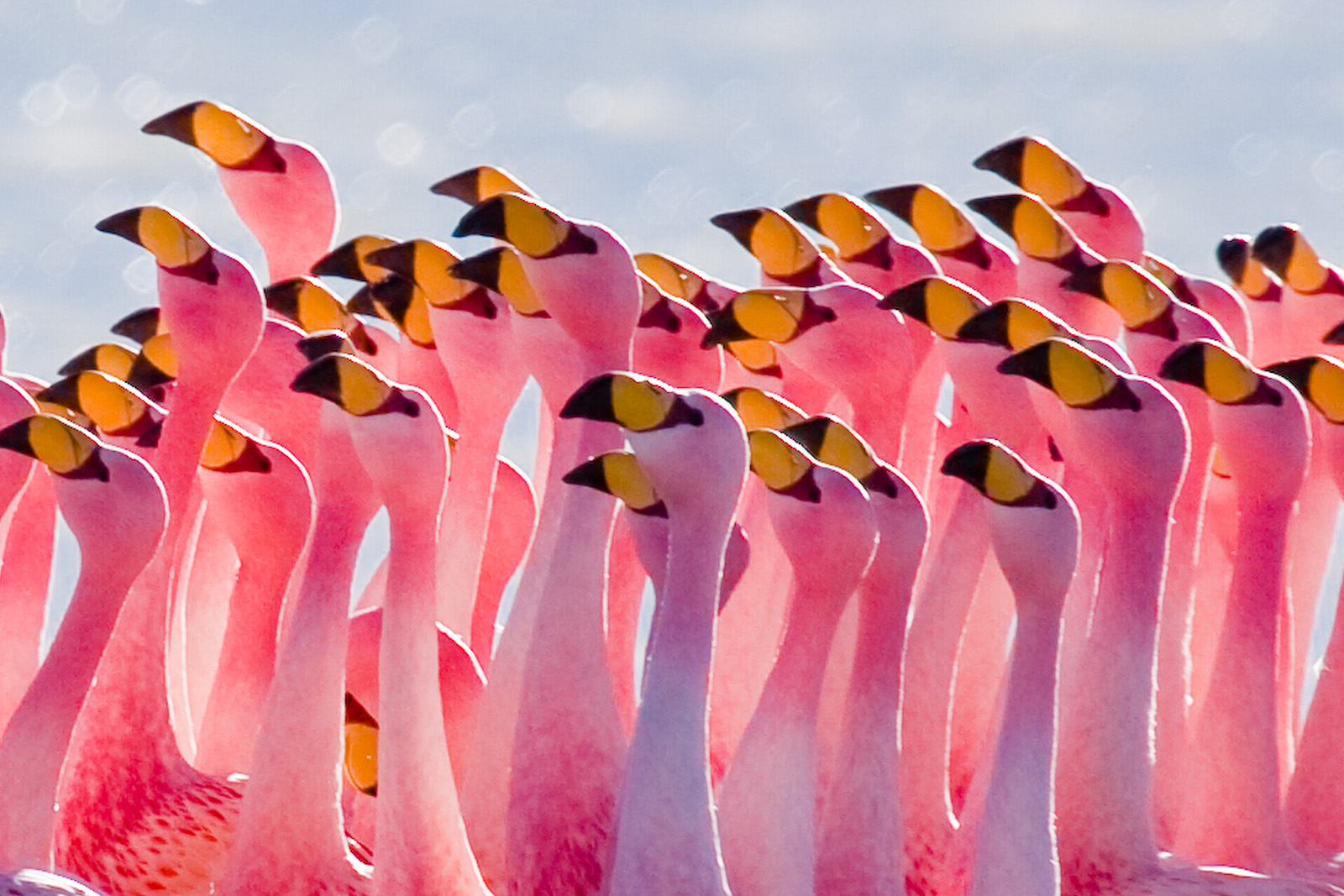
Flamingos in Laguna Hedionda

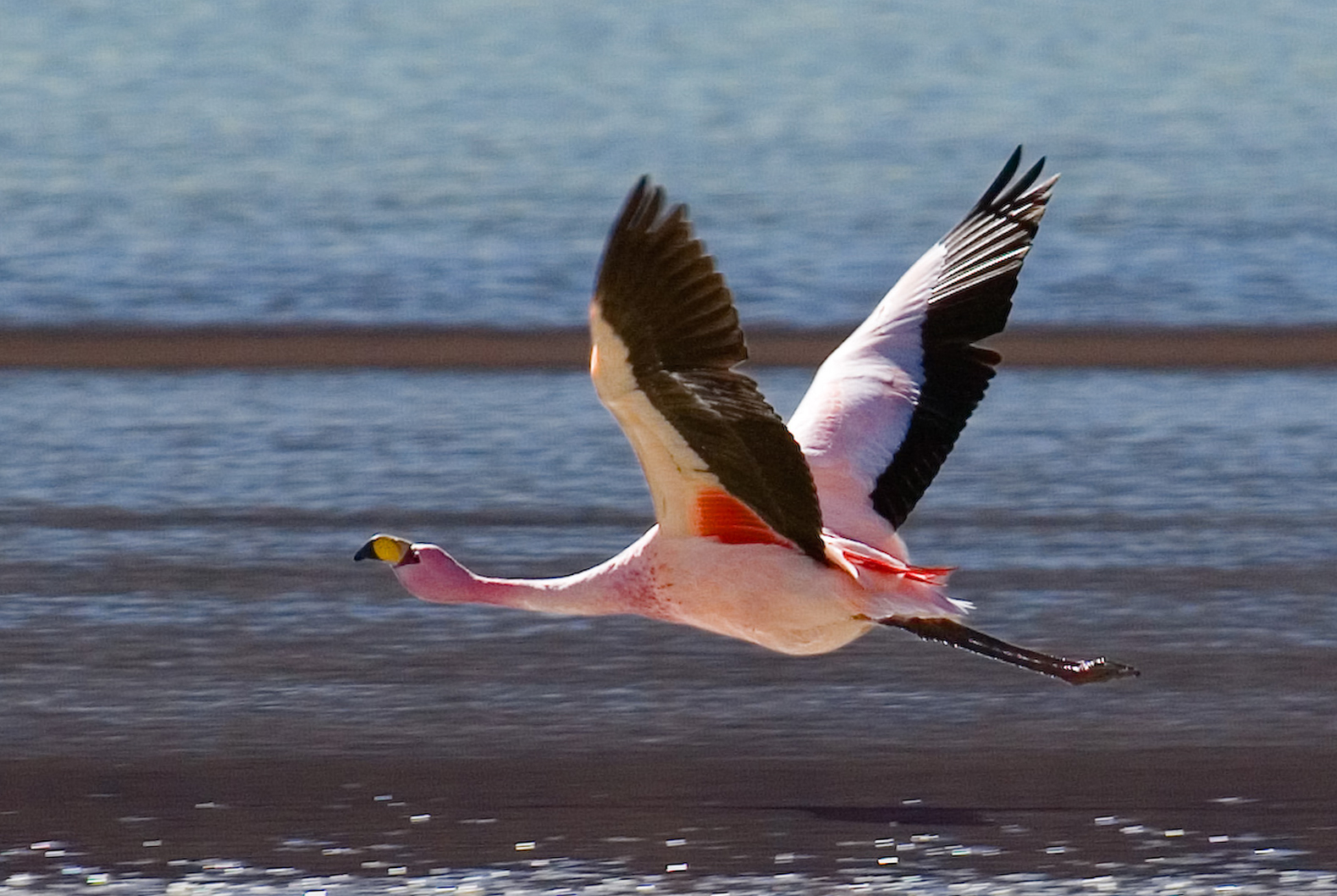
Flamingo flying over the Laguna Hedionda

Set in the backdrop of snow-covered mountains, the lake, like its neighbours, is famous for a variety of high Andean waterfowl, particularly flamingos (mostly white for the reason that algae that creates the pink colour is comparatively less in the lake waters), and other bird species such as ducks and the Andean goose, and herds of vicuña are also reported. The southern lakes in the Bolivian Altiplano including Laguna Hedionda form one of the major wintering grounds for Phalaropus tricolor followed by Phoenicopterus chilensis and Phoenicopterus jamesi. On one particular date in February 1979, Phalaropus tricolor, Phoenicoparrus jamesi, Phoenicoparrus andinus and Phoenicopterus chilensis counted in the area were about one million, out of which 500,000 were reported from Laguna Hedionda and two other lakes.

== Culture ==
Hunter gatherers of the paleo-ceramic or Paleo-Indian period (8,000 BC) lived in the vicinity of the lake. Between 10,000 BC and 2500 BC, the languages spoken in the area were Uru and Choquela.

== Gallery ==
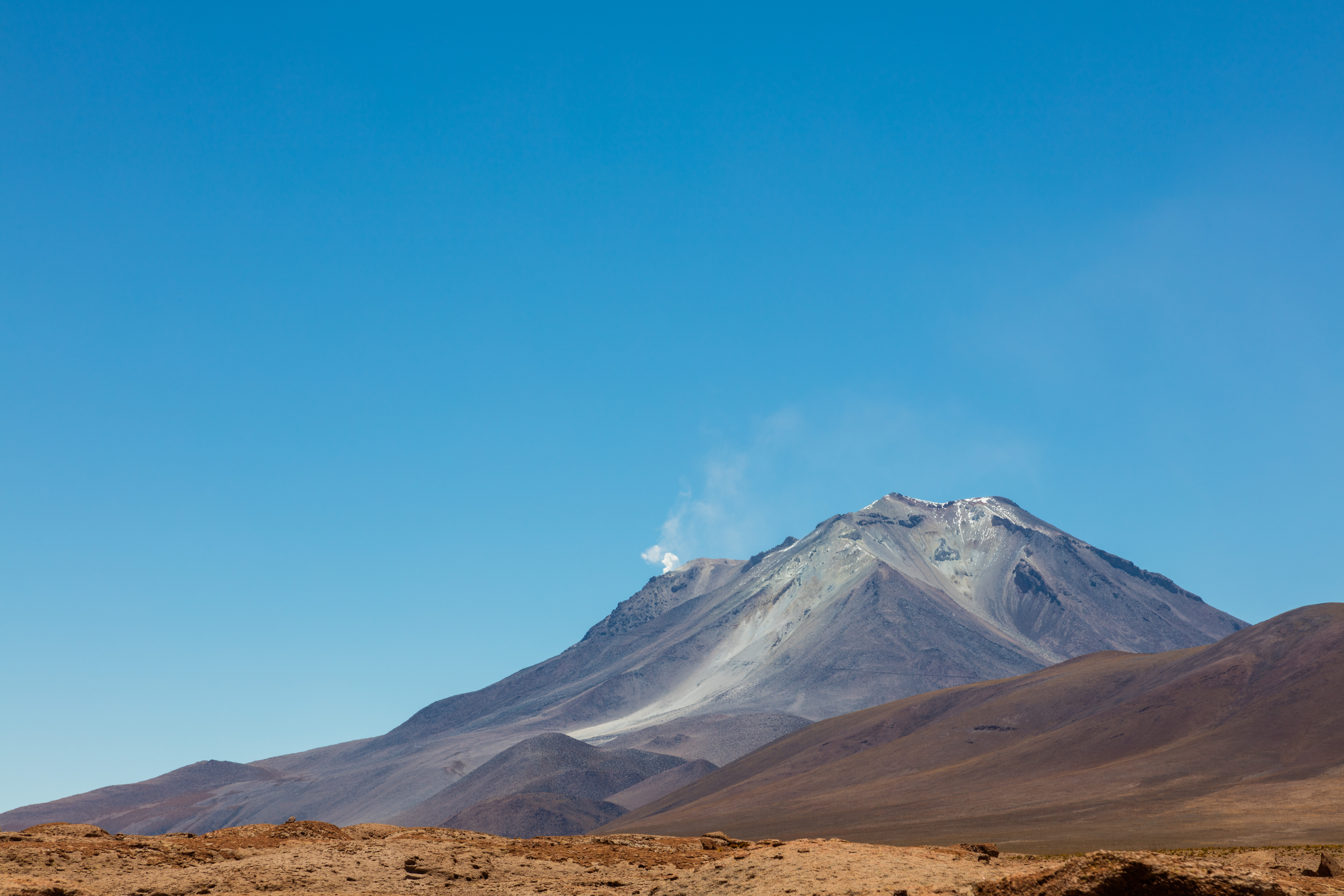
Ollagüe Volcano as seen from Bolivia

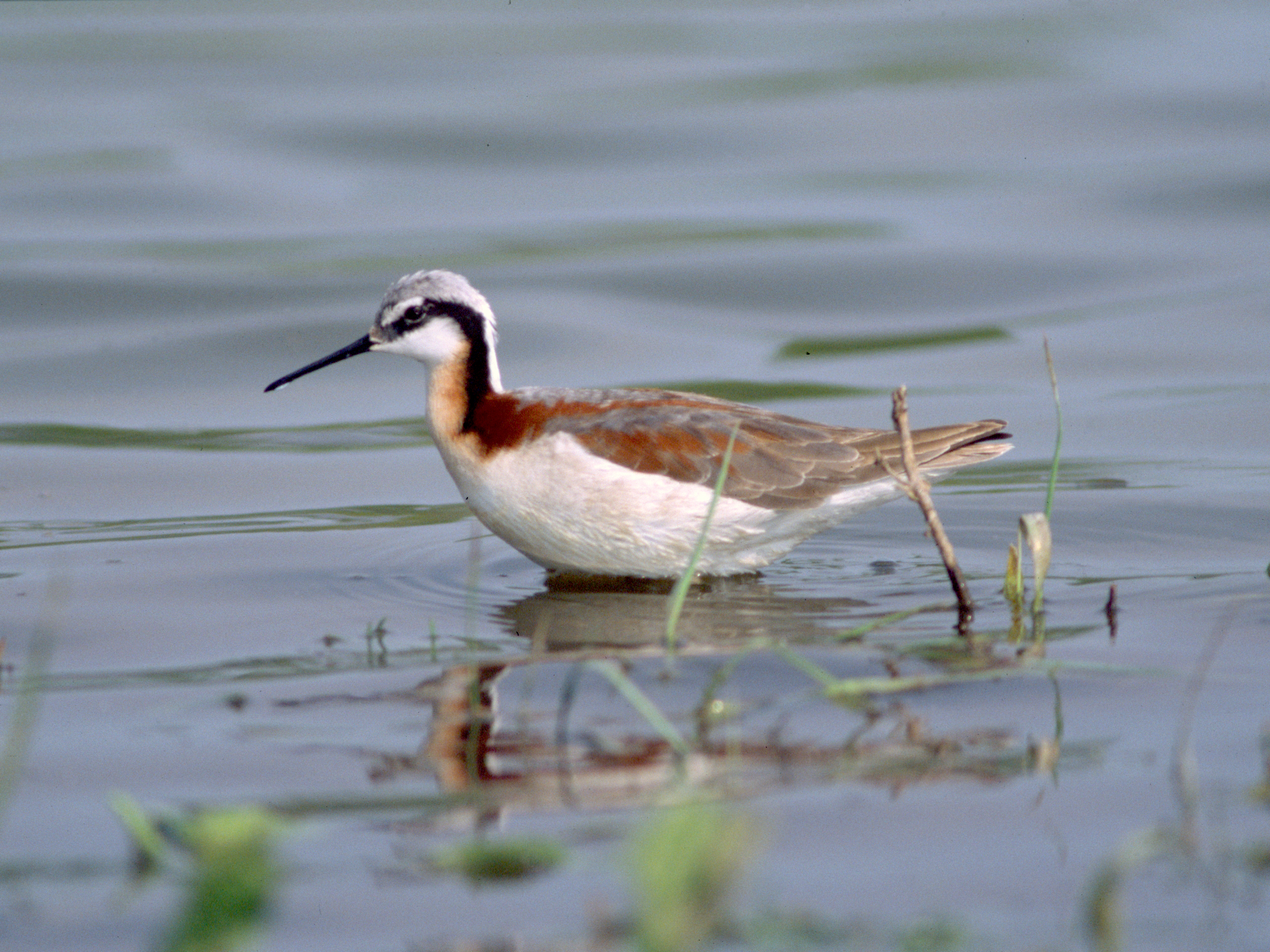
Phalaropus tricolor

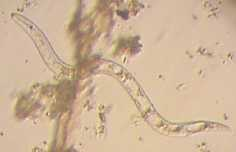
Nematodes

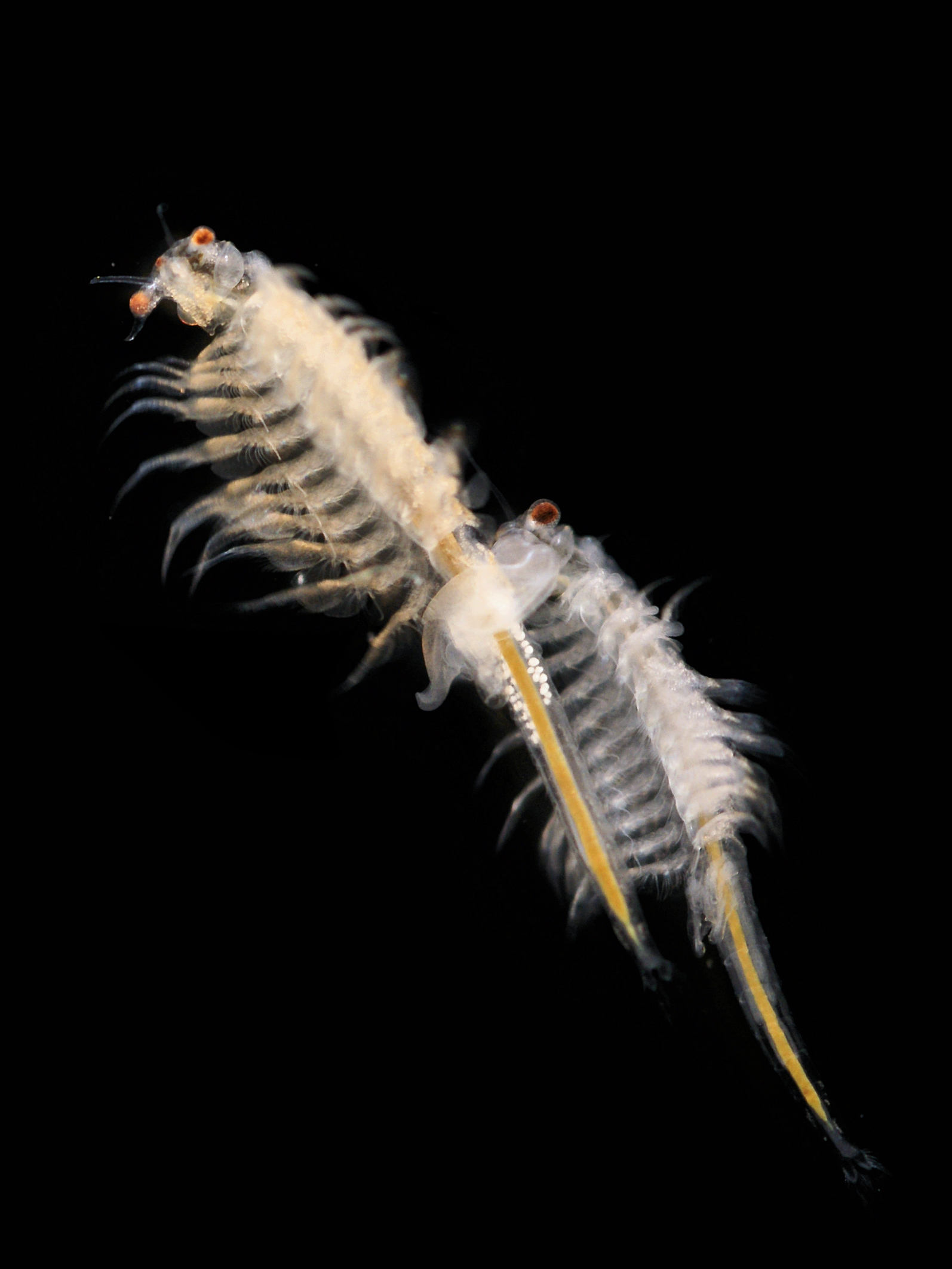
Artemia salina

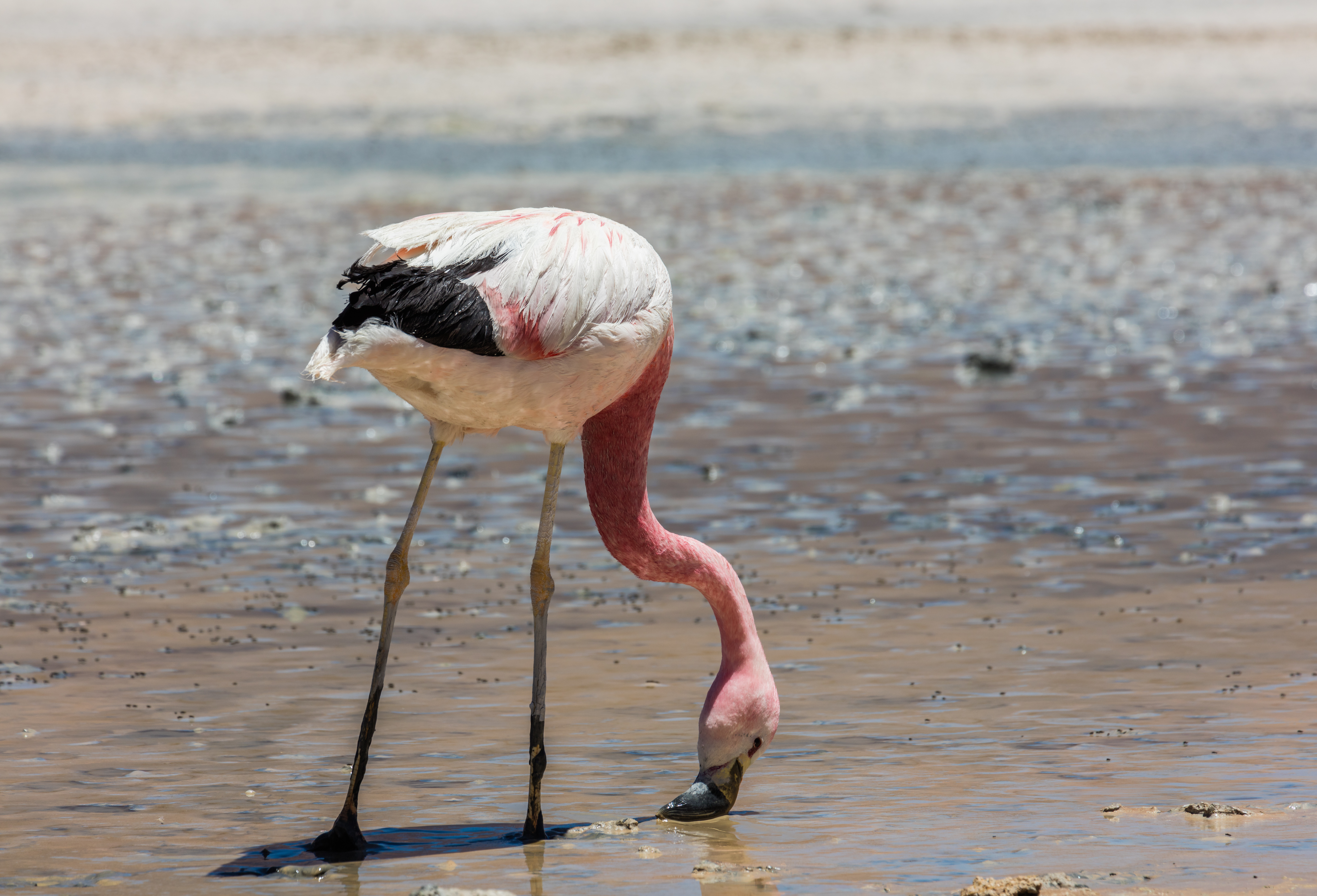
Andean flamingo (Phoenicoparrus andinus)

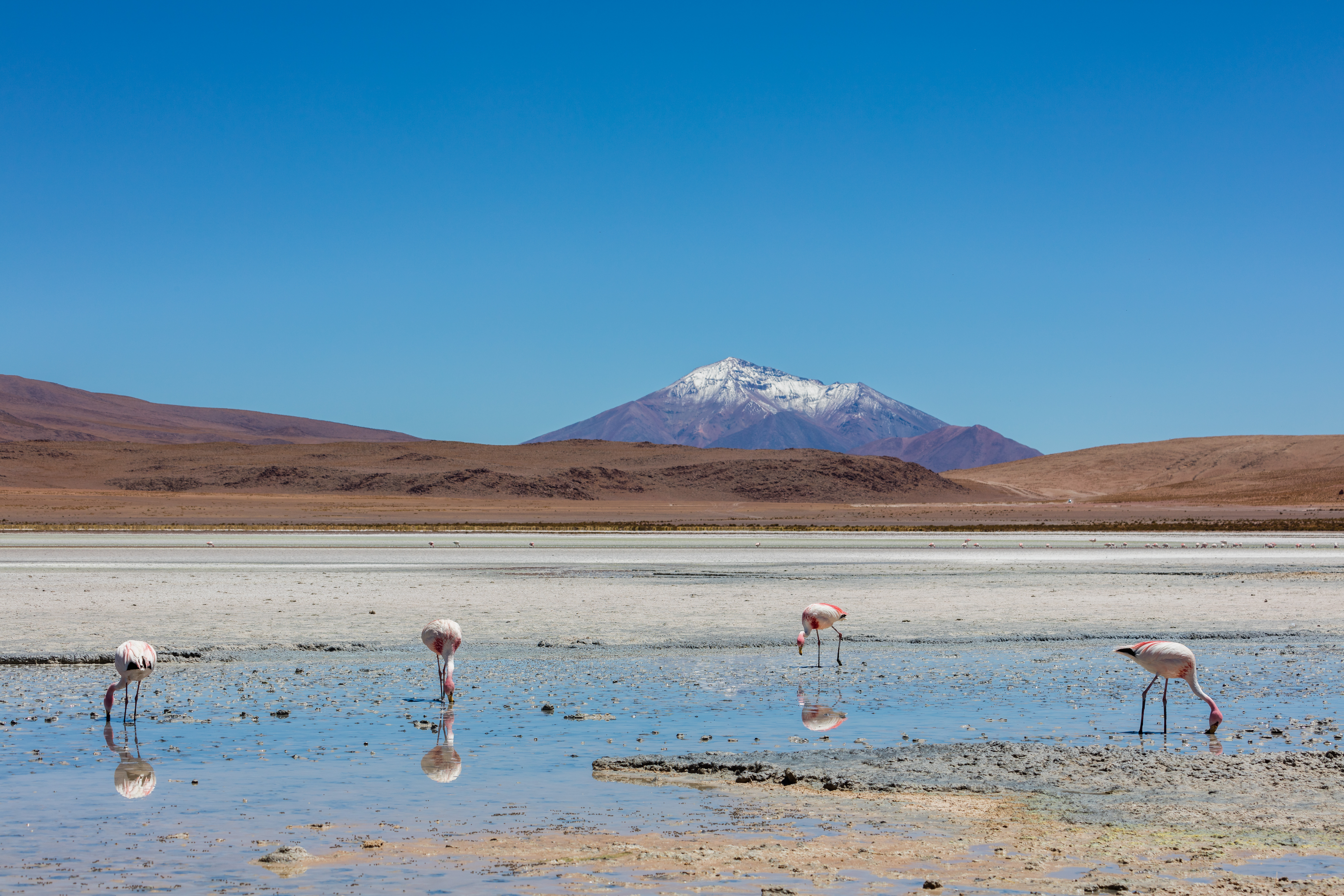
Landscape in Laguna Hedionda

== See also ==
- Laguna Hedionda (Sud Lípez), a smaller salt lake in Sud Lípez Province
