= Cerro Araral =

Mountain in Bolivia

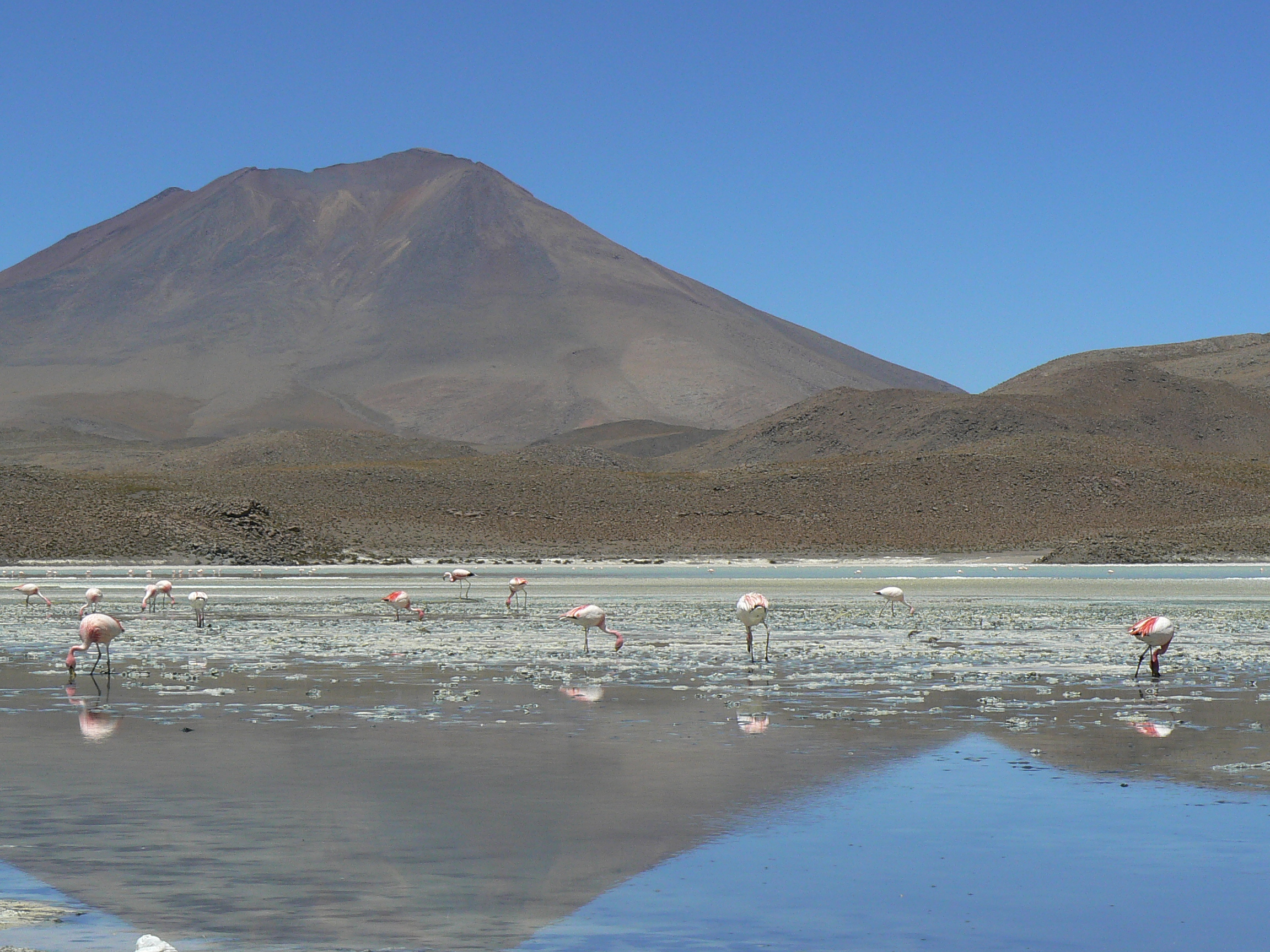
- Laguna Hedionda

Highest point
- Elevation: 5,647 m (18,527 ft)
- Coordinates: 21°37′S 68°13′W

Geography
- Location within Bolivia
- Location: Bolivia-Chile
- Parent range: Andes

Cerro Araral is an extinct volcano located in the Andes on the border between Chile and Bolivia in the Potosí Department and in the Antofagasta Region. It has a height of 5647 metres, rising over a base of 3900 metres and covers an area of 109.4 square kilometres (42.2 sq mi). The edifice has a volume of 43.4 cubic kilometres (10.4 cu mi), down from 47.2 cubic kilometres (11.3 cu mi) due to erosion. Based on the erosion rate, the volcano is 1.9-2.75 and forms an alignment with Cerro Ascotan. Its formation may be linked to the Altiplano-Puna Magma Body, which appear to have contributed to part of Araral's magmas. The modern snowline on the mountain lies at more than 5,700 metres (18,700 ft) altitude. There are archeological sites at its base and on its flanks. The volcanism is at first andesitic and later becomes intermediary between andesite and basalt, with olivine, plagioclase and pyroxene.

== See also ==
- List of mountains in the Andes
