= Ch'iyar Quta (Nor Lípez) =

Bolivian lake

- Location within Bolivia Location within South America
- Interactive map of Ch'iyar Quta
- Location: Bolivia, Potosí Department, Nor Lípez Province
- Coordinates: 21°35′14″S 68°03′52″W
- Surface elevation: 4,201 m (13,783 ft)

Ch'iyar Quta (Aymara ch'iyara black, quta lake, "black lake", hispanicized spellings Chiar Kkota, Chiar Khota, Chiar Kota) is a Bolivian lake located in the San Pedro de Quemes Municipality, Nor Lípez Province of the Potosí Department near the border to Chile. It is situated at a height of about 4,201 meters (13,783 feet) south west of Laguna Hedionda and east of Mount Araral.

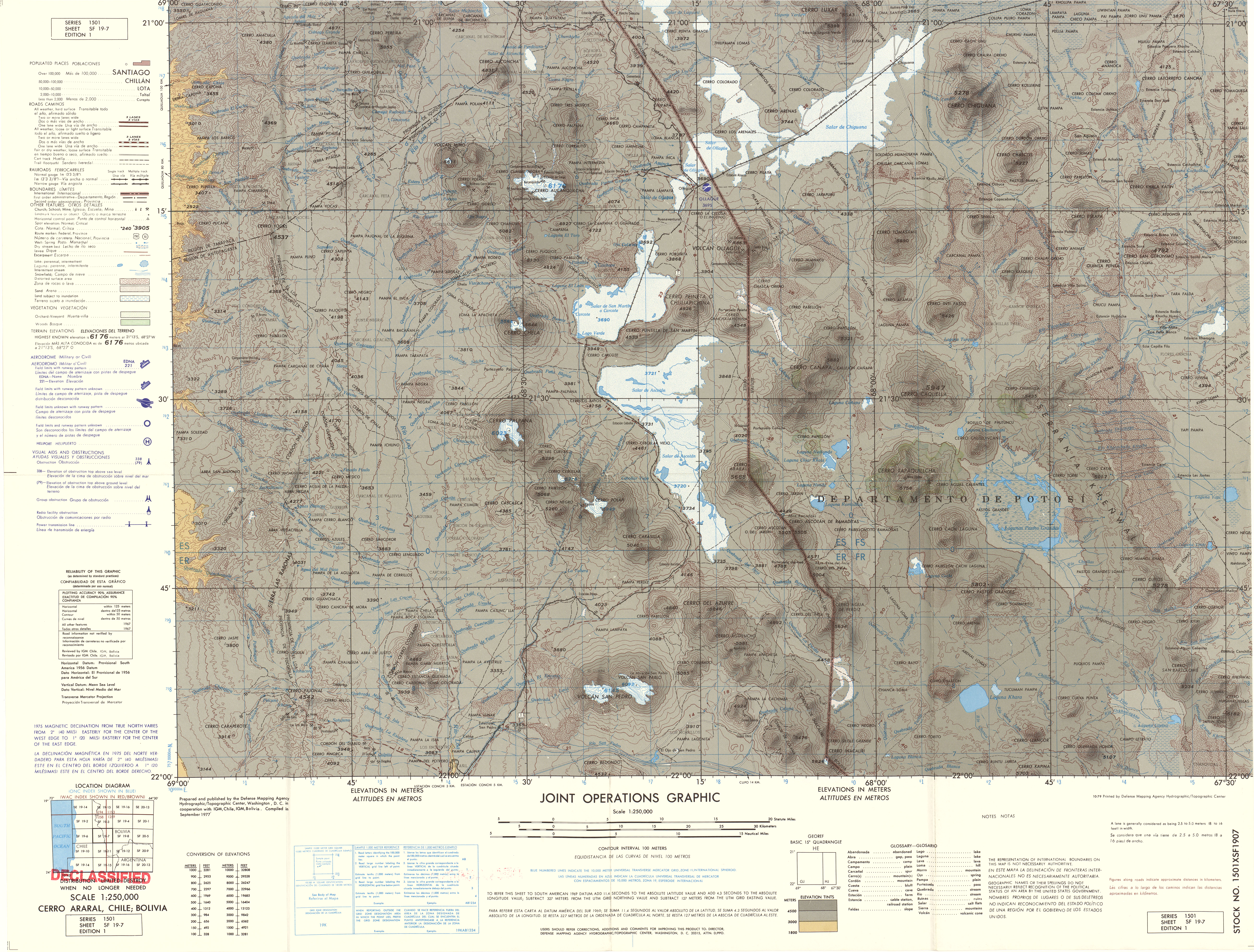

== See also ==
- Lake Kara
- Laguna Pastos Grande
