= Pampa Luxsar =

Volcanic field in Bolivia

Highest point
- Elevation: 5,543 m (18,186 ft)
- Coordinates: 20.85°S 68.20°W

Geography
- Location: Bolivia

Geology
- Rock age: Holocene
- Mountain type: Volcanic field
- Last eruption: Unknown

Pampa Luxsar is a little known volcanic field located in Bolivia, southwest of the Salar de Uyuni.

It consists of a field of lava flows that cover a surface area of 45 by 45 kilometres (28 mi × 28 mi). Cones are also found within the field, although vents are difficult to discern. The lava flows partly coalesce and are of uniform appearance, despite differences in their albedo. The field is constructed by basaltic andesite and andesite. The activity of the field may have been controlled by faults, which were later buried by lava flows.

The field surrounds the older stratovolcanoes Cerro Luxsar and Cerro Uquila, which are heavily eroded. It was erupted over several stages, with the youngest being of Pleistocene or Holocene age. One vent known as Cerro Negro is a maar and probably formed under the influence of paleolakes such as Lake Minchin or Lake Tauca, which have left lake terraces in the region.

== See also ==
- List of volcanoes in Bolivia
- List of volcanic fields
