= Kara Lake =

Lake in the Potosí Department, Bolivia

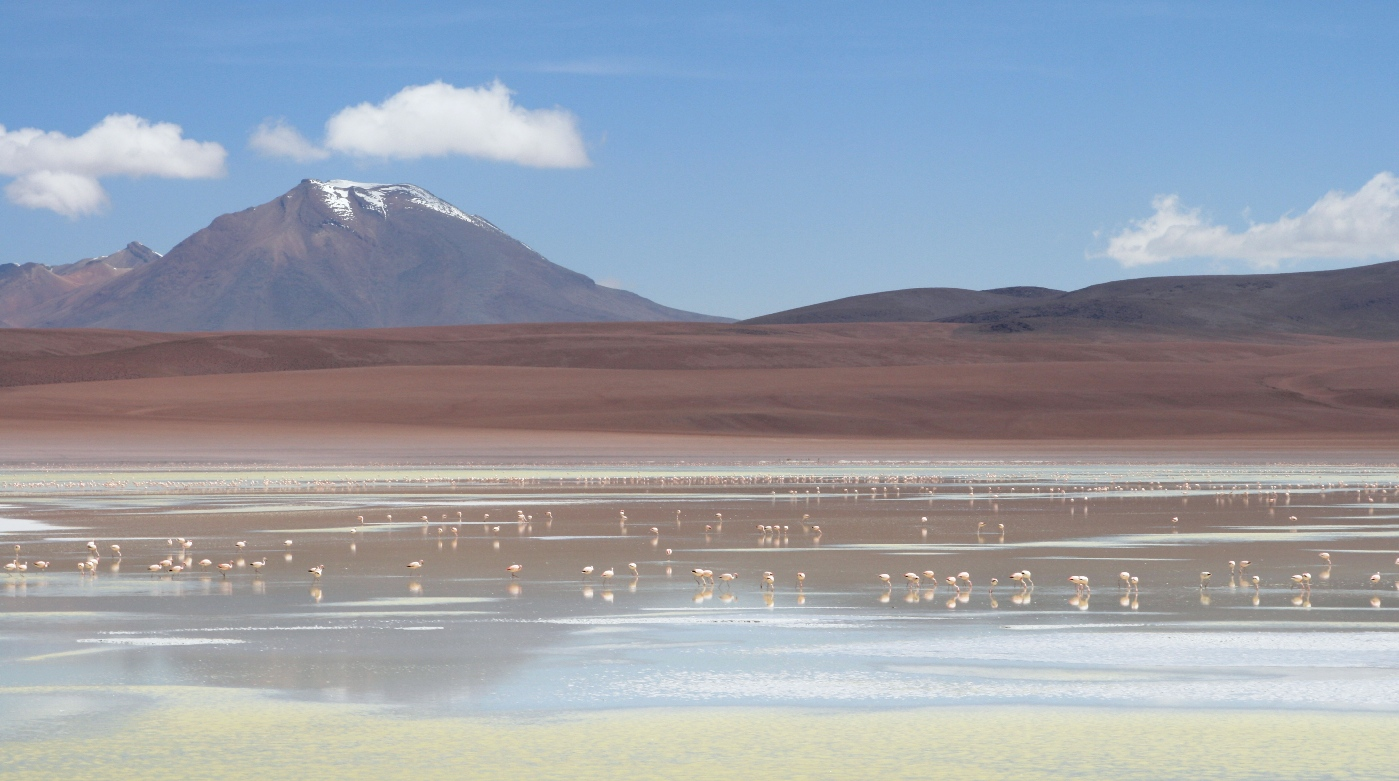

- Location within Bolivia Location within South America
- Interactive map of Kara Lake
- Location: Potosí Department
- Coordinates: 21°54′S 67°52′W
- Primary outflows: evaporation
- Basin countries: Bolivia
- Surface area: 13 km^{2} (5.0 sq mi)
- Surface elevation: 4,522 m (14,836 ft)

Kara Lake is a lake in the Potosí Department, Bolivia. At an elevation of 4522 m, its surface area is 13 km^{2}.

== See also ==
- Ch'iyar Quta
