= Nor Lípez Province =

Nor Lípez
- Province
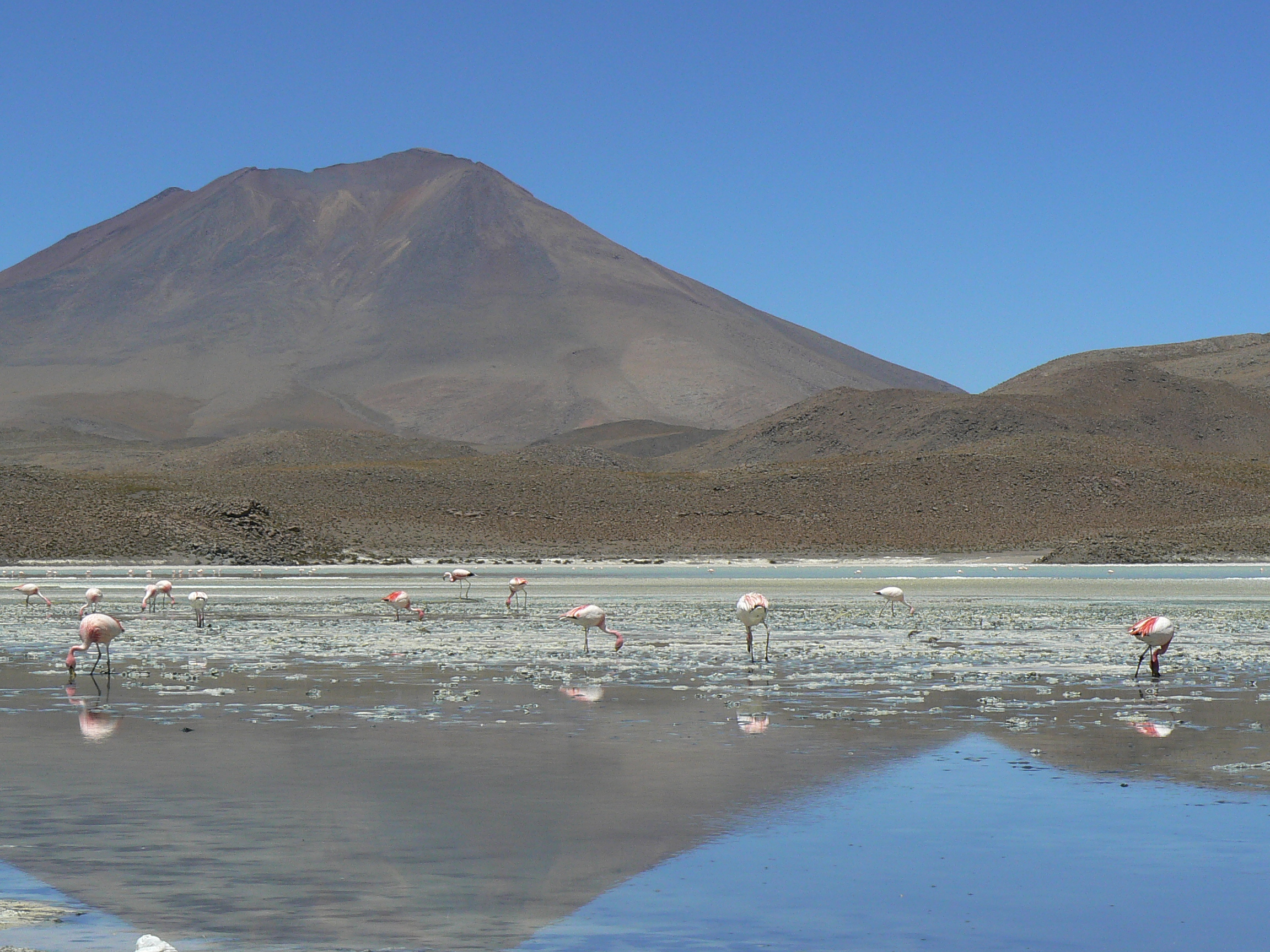
- James's flamingos at Cañapa Lake, Colcha "K" Municipality

- Flag Seal

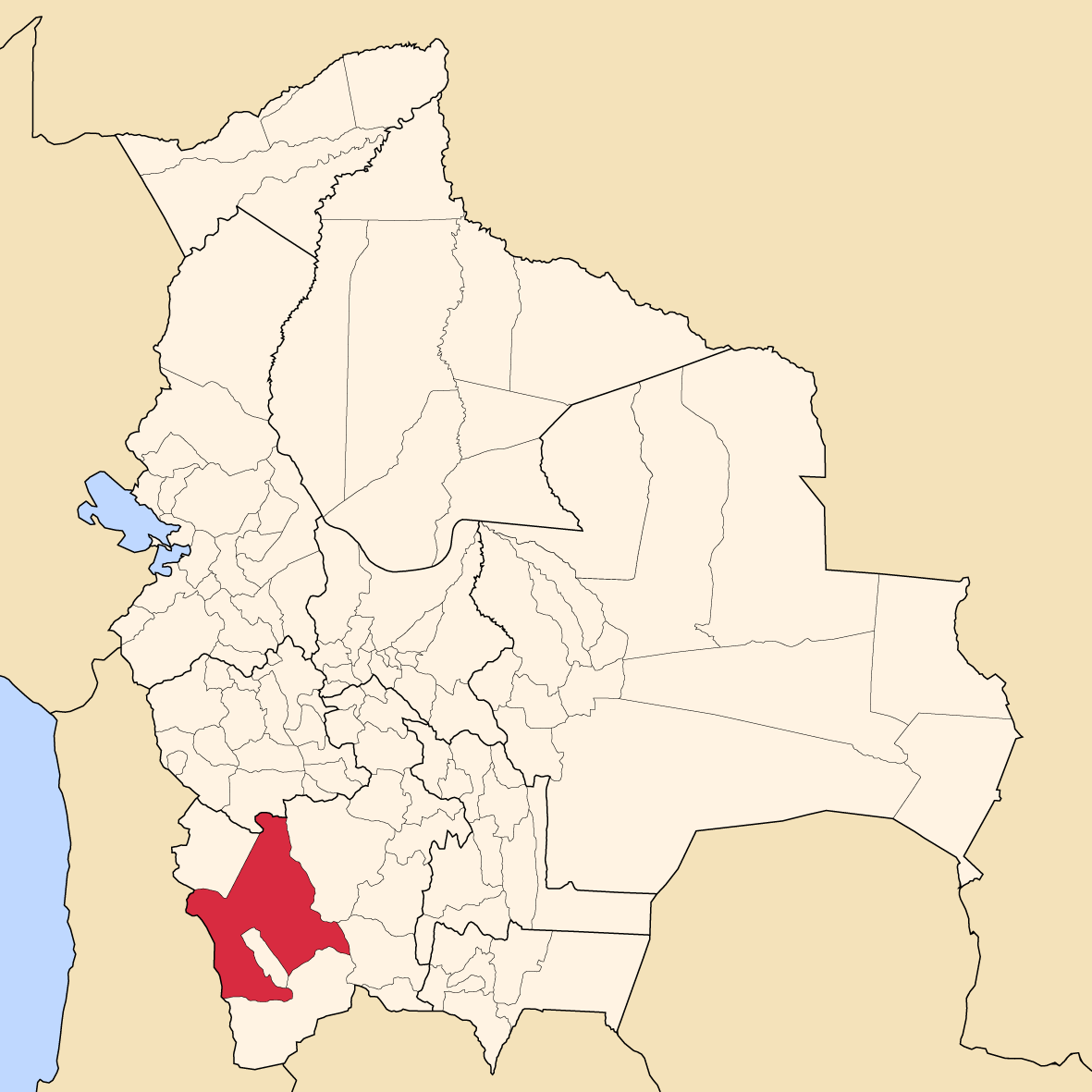
- Location of the Nor Lípez Province within Bolivia

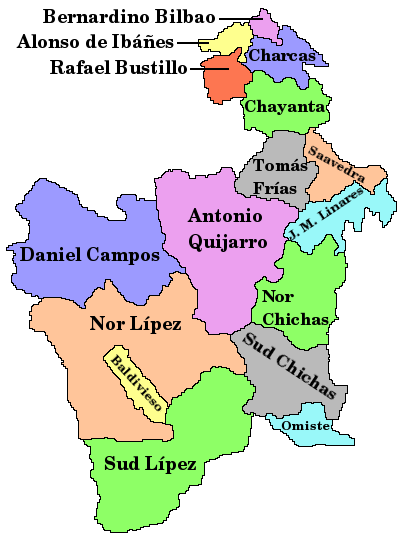
- Provinces of the Potosí Department
- Coordinates: 21°14′0″S 67°27′0″W
- Country: Bolivia
- Department: Potosí Department
- Capital: Colcha "K"

Area
  - Total: 10,883 sq mi (28,187 km^{2})

Population (2024 census)
  - Total: 14,241
  - Density: 1.3085/sq mi (0.50523/km^{2})
  - Ethnicities: Quechua
- Time zone: UTC-4 (BOT)

Nor Lípez is a province in the Bolivian department of Potosí. Its seat is Colcha "K", also called Villa Martín. The majority of the area of the province was titled as the Nor Lípez Native Community Land on 19 April 2011. One of the largest mines of Bolivia, the San Cristóbal Mine, is located near San Cristóbal in Colcha "K" municipality.

== Geography ==
Some of the highest mountains of the province are listed below:

- Allqa Urqu
- Chakra Urqu
- Chiwana
- Chullunkhäni
- Chumpi Urqu
- Ch'aska Urqu
- Iru Phutunqu
- Kachi Unu
- Kuntur Umu
- K'uchu Unu
- Luxsar
- Millu Urqu
- Muru
- Paruma
- Patilla
- Puka Wasi
- Qaral
- Suni K'ira
- Tankani
- Tijtin
- Ullawi
- Ullqa
- Wanaku
- Yanantillayuq
- Yarita

== Location ==
The province is one of sixteen provinces in the Potosí Department. It is located between 20° 27' and 22° 01' South and between 66° 18' and 68° 35' West.

It is bordered by the Daniel Campos Province to the north, the Republic of Chile to the west, the Enrique Baldivieso Province and Sur Lípez Province to the south, Sud Chichas Province to the east, and the Antonio Quijarro Province to the northeast.

The province extends over 270 km from east to west and 210 km from north to south.

== Division ==
The province comprises two municipalities which are further subdivided into cantons.

| Section | Municipality | Inhabitants 2001 | Seat | Inhabitants 2001 |
|---|---|---|---|---|
| 1st | Colcha "K" Municipality | 9,645 | Colcha "K" or Villa Martín | 853 |
| 2nd | San Pedro de Quemes Municipality | 815 | San Pedro de Quemes | 508 |

== Population ==
The population increased from 8,320 (1992 census) to 10,460 inhabitants (2001 census), an increase of 25,7%.

About 96% of the population have no access to electricity, 93% have no sanitary facilities. 61% of the population are employed in agriculture, 9% in mining, 2% in industry, 28% in general services. 90% of the population are Catholics, 6% are Protestants.

The people are predominantly indigenous citizens of Quechuan descent.

| Ethnic group | Colcha „K“ Municipality (%) | San Pedro de Quemes Municipality (%) |
|---|---|---|
| Quechua | 88.2 | 45.0 |
| Aymara | 5.6 | 6.3 |
| Guaraní, Chiquitos, Moxos | 0.1 | 0.2 |
| Not indigenous | 6.0 | 48.3 |
| Other indigenous groups | 0.1 | 0.2 |

== Languages ==
The languages spoken in the province are mainly Spanish and Quechua.

| Language | Colcha “K” Municipality | San Pedro de Quemes Municipality |
|---|---|---|
| Quechua | 7,256 | 187 |
| Aymara | 333 | 67 |
| Guaraní | 1 | 0 |
| Another native | 2 | 0 |
| Spanish | 7,932 | 721 |
| Foreign | 28 | 3 |
| Only native | 878 | 1 |
| Native and Spanish | 6,616 | 222 |
| Only Spanish | 1,319 | 499 |

Ref.: obd.descentralizacion.gov.bo

== Places of interest ==
- Cañapa Lake
- Chiguana Lake
- Laguna Hedionda
- Kara Lake
- Pastos Grandes Lake
- Sarapuru volcano
- Sonequera
- Tapaquilcha

== See also ==
- Ch'iyar Quta
- Laqaya
- Puka Mayu
