= Tarata =

Tarata may refer to:

== Geography ==
- Tarata, Peru, a city in the Tarata Province, Tacna Region, Peru
- Tarata District, a district in the Tarata Province, Peru
- Tarata Province, a province in the Tacna Region, Peru
- Tarata, Cochabamba, a town in the Cochabamba Department, Bolivia
- Tarata Municipality, a municipal section of the Esteban Arce Province, Cochabamba Department, Bolivia
- Tărâţa, a village in the commune of Pârjol, Bacău County, Romania
- Tarata statistical area, a census division in Taranaki, New Zealand
- Tarata, Taranaki, a locality in Taranaki, New Zealand

== Other uses ==
- Tarata bombing, a terrorist attack in Peru in 1992
- Tarata or lemonwood, the New Zealand tree Pittosporum eugenioides
