= Hatun Urqu =

Hatun Urqu or Jatun Urqu (Quechua hatun big (in Bolivia always jatun), urqu mountain, "big mountain", also spelled Atun Orco, Atún Orco, Atun Orcco, Atunorco, Ccatun Orcco, Ccatunorcco, Jatun Orcco, Jatun Orjo, Jatun Orkho, Jatún Orkho, Jatunorcco, Qatun Orqo) may refer to:

- Hatun Urqu (Acomayo), a mountain in the Acomayo Province, Cusco Region, Peru
- Hatun Urqu (Chumbivilcas), a mountain in the Chumbivilcas Province, Cusco Region, Peru
- Hatun Urqu (Huancavelica), a mountain in the Huancavelica Region, Peru
- Jatun Urqu (Bolivia), a mountain near Sacabamba in the Sacabamba Municipality, Esteban Arce Province, Cochabamba Department, Bolivia
- Jatun Urqu (Matarani), a mountain near Matarani in the Sacabamba Municipality, Esteban Arce Province, Cochabamba Department, Bolivia
- Jatun Urqu (Mizque), a mountain in the Mizque Province, Cochabamba Department, Bolivia
- Jatun Urqu (Potosí), a mountain in the Potosí Department, Bolivia
