= Jatun Urqu =

Jatun Urqu may refer to:

- Jatun Urqu (Bolivia), a mountain in the Bolivian Andes
- Jatun Urqu (Matarani), a mountain in the Bolivian Andes
- Jatun Urqu (Mizque), a mountain in the Bolivian Andes
- Jatun Urqu (Potosí), a mountain in the Bolivian Andes
