= Huasa Rancho Canton =

Huasa Rancho Canton Wasa Ranchu kantun
- Canton
- Interactive map of Huasa Rancho Canton
- Coordinates: 17.61450°S 65.96707°W
- Country: Bolivia
- Department: Cochabamba Department
- Province: Esteban Arce Province
- Municipality: Tarata Municipality
- Seat: Huasa Rancho

Population (2001)
  - Total: 822

Huasa Rancho Canton (Quechua: Wasa Ranchu kantun) is one of the cantons of the Tarata Municipality, the first municipal section of the Esteban Arce Province in the Cochabamba Department in central Bolivia. Its seat is Huasa Rancho.
