= Tarata Canton =

Tarata Canton T'arata
- Canton
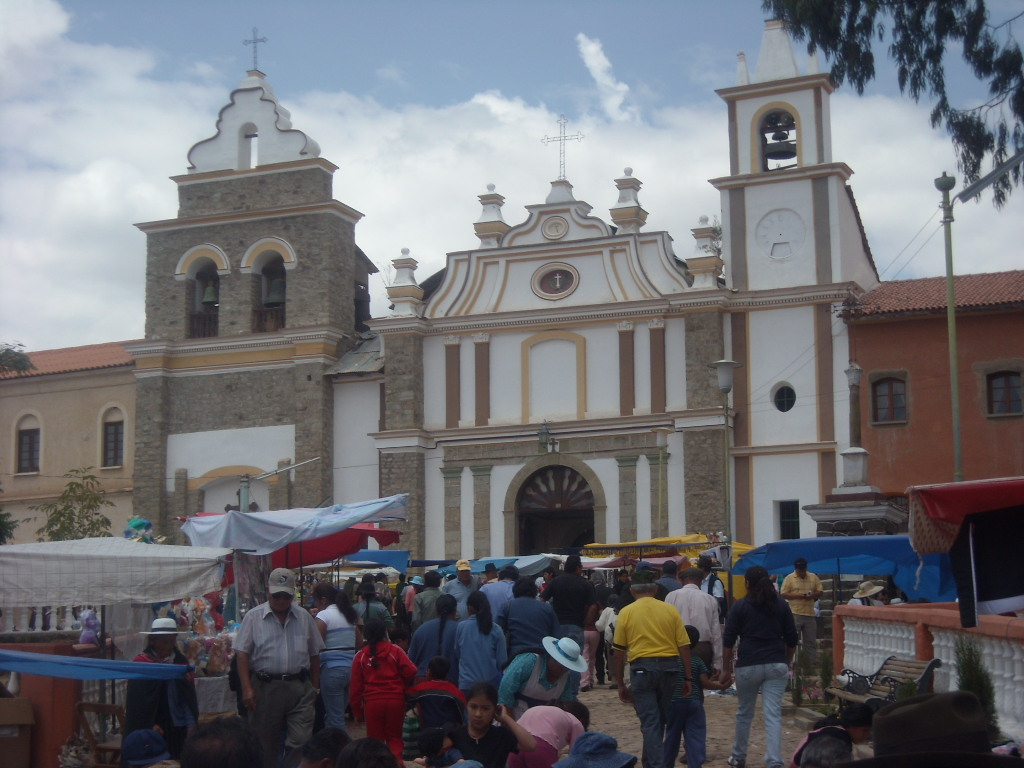
- San José church in Esteban Arce square (Moko Pata), Tarata

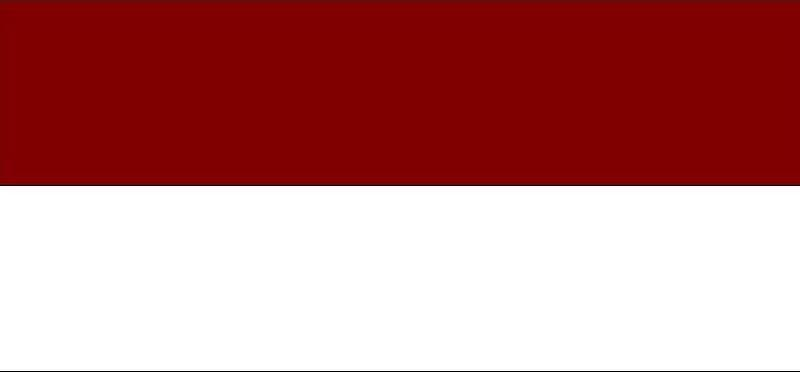
- Flag

- Location of Tarata within Bolivia
- Coordinates: 17°37′0″S 66°01′0″W
- Country: Bolivia
- Department: Cochabamba Department
- Province: Esteban Arce Province
- Municipality: Tarata Municipality
- Seat: Tarata

Population (2001)
  - Total: 5,983

Tarata Canton (Quechua: T'arata) is one of the cantons of the Tarata Municipality, the first municipal section of the Esteban Arce Province in the Cochabamba Department in central Bolivia. Its seat is the town of Tarata (3,323 inhabitants, census 2001).
