= Izata Canton =

- Canton
- Location of Izata within Bolivia
- Coordinates: 17°46′0″S 66°03′0″W
- Country: Bolivia
- Department: Cochabamba Department
- Province: Esteban Arce Province
- Municipality: Tarata Municipality
- Seat: Izata

Population (2001)
  - Total: 776

Izata Canton is one of the cantons of the Tarata Municipality, the first municipal section of the Esteban Arce Province in the Cochabamba Department in central Bolivia. Its seat is Izata.
