= Anzaldo Canton =

- Canton
- Location of Anzaldo within Bolivia
- Coordinates: 17°50′0″S 65°55′0″W
- Country: Bolivia
- Department: Cochabamba Department
- Province: Esteban Arce Province
- Municipality: Anzaldo Municipality
- Seat: Anzaldo

Population (2001)
  - Total: 7,026

Anzaldo Canton is one of the cantons of the Anzaldo Municipality, the second municipal section of the Esteban Arce Province in the Cochabamba Department in central Bolivia. Its seat is Anzaldo (1,178 inhabitants, census 2001).
