= Pukara (Cochabamba) =

Mountain in Bolivia

- Location within Bolivia

Highest point
- Elevation: 3,760 m (12,340 ft)
- Coordinates: 17°44′20″S 65°47′00″W

Geography
- Location: Bolivia, Cochabamba Department
- Parent range: Andes

Pukara (Aymara and Quechua for fortress, also spelled Pucara) is a mountain in the Bolivian Andes which reaches a height of approximately 3,760 m (12,340 ft). It is located in the Cochabamba Department, Esteban Arce Province, Sacabamba Municipality. Pukara lies southwest of Atuq Wachana and northwest of Jatun Urqu, southwest of the village of Yana Rumi.
