= Huayculi Canton =

- Canton
- Location of Huayculi within Bolivia
- Coordinates: 17°40′0″S 65°59′0″W
- Country: Bolivia
- Department: Cochabamba Department
- Province: Esteban Arce Province
- Municipality: Tarata Municipality
- Seat: Huayculi

Population (2001)
  - Total: 1,134

Huayculi Canton is one of the cantons of the Tarata Municipality, the first municipal section of the Esteban Arce Province in the Cochabamba Department in central Bolivia. Its seat is Huayculi.
