= Arbieto Canton =

- Canton
- Location of Arbieto within Bolivia
- Coordinates: 17°34′0″S 66°01′0″W
- Country: Bolivia
- Department: Cochabamba Department
- Province: Esteban Arce Province
- Municipality: Arbieto Municipality
- Seat: Arbieto

Population (2001)
  - Total: 4,156

Arbieto Canton is one of the cantons of the Arbieto Municipality, the third municipal section of the Esteban Arce Province in the Cochabamba Department in central Bolivia. Its seat is Arbieto (1,347 inhabitants, census 2001).
