= Quiriria Canton =

- Canton
- Location of Quiriria within Bolivia
- Coordinates: 17°54′0″S 65°56′0″W
- Country: Bolivia
- Department: Cochabamba Department
- Province: Esteban Arce Province
- Municipality: Anzaldo Municipality
- Seat: Quiriria

Population (2001)
  - Total: 1,043

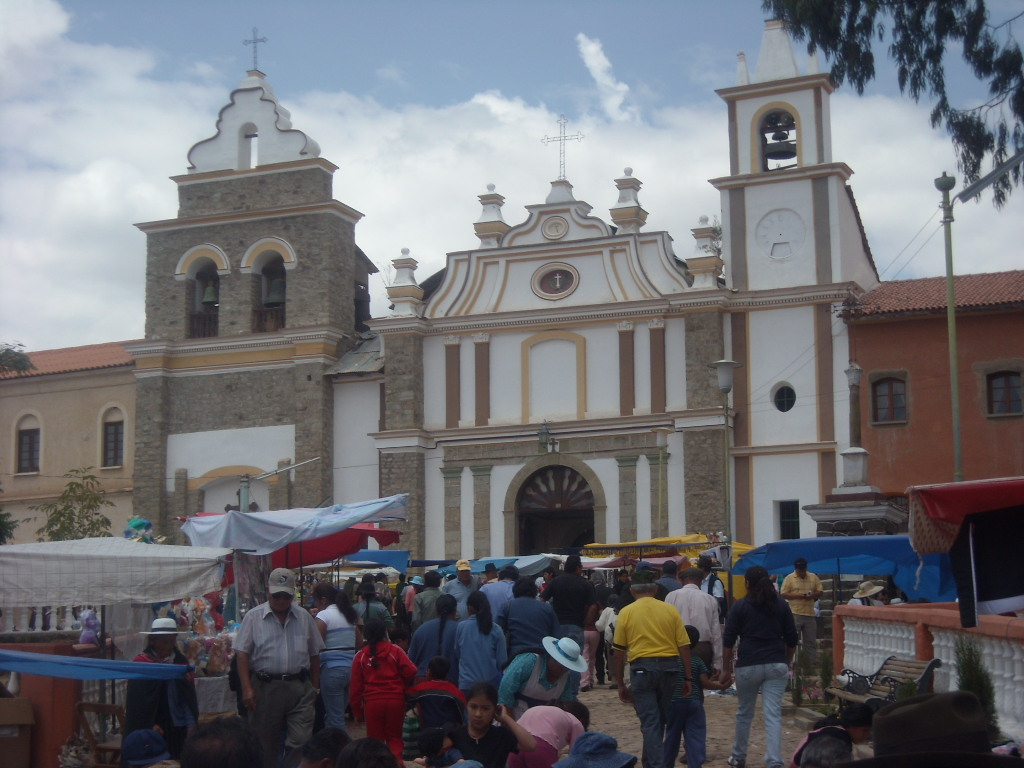
San José Temple

Quiriria Canton is one of the cantons of the Anzaldo Municipality, the second municipal section of the Esteban Arce Province in the Cochabamba Department in central Bolivia. Its seat is Quiriria.
