= La Viña Canton =

- Canton
- Country: Bolivia
- Department: Cochabamba Department
- Province: Esteban Arce Province
- Municipality: Anzaldo Municipality
- Seat: La Viña

Population (2001)
  - Total: 1,057

La Viña Canton used to be one of the cantons of the Anzaldo Municipality, the second municipal section of the Esteban Arce Province in the Cochabamba Department in central Bolivia. Its seat is La Viña.
