= Tarata, Cochabamba =

Tarata
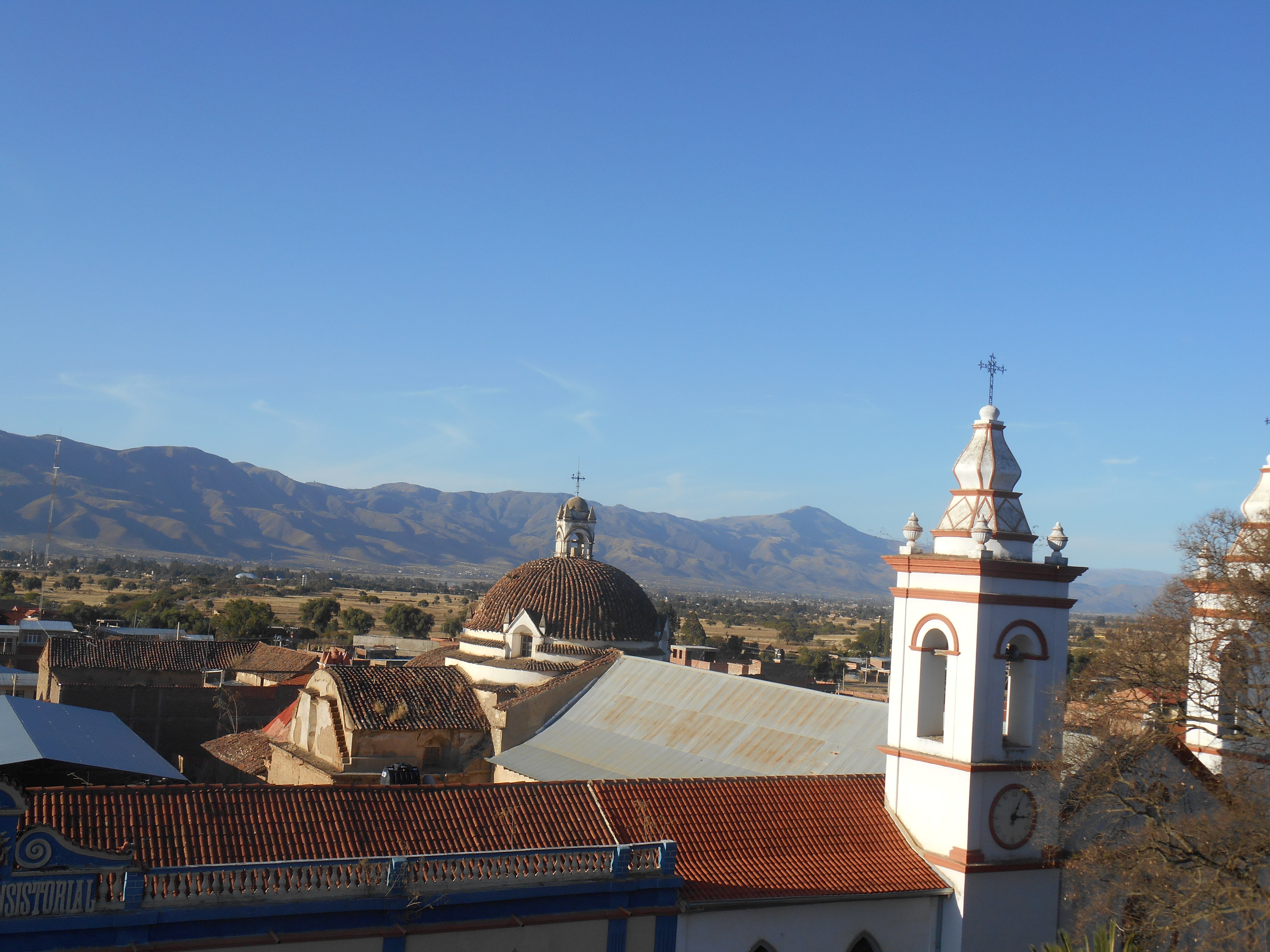
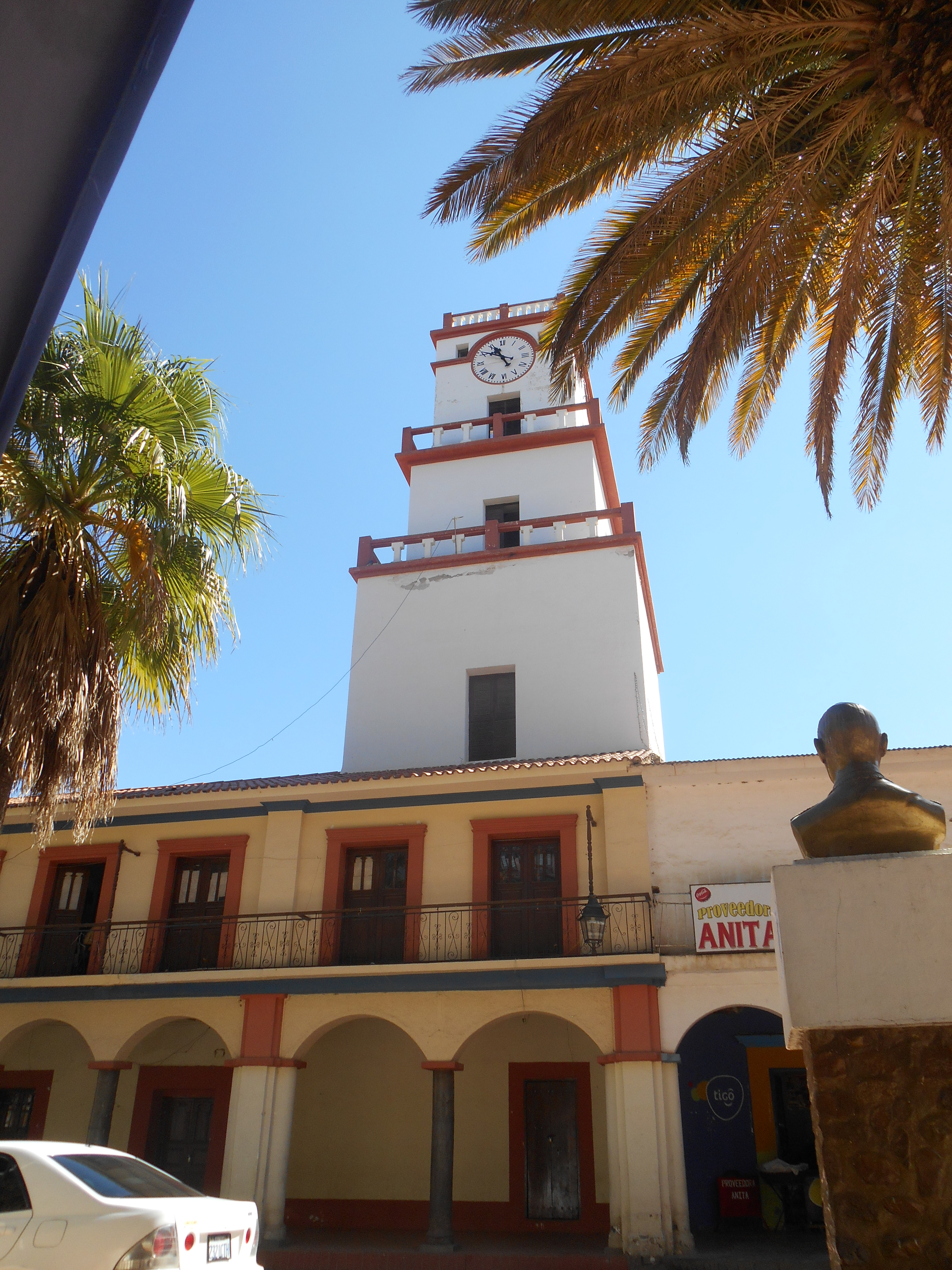
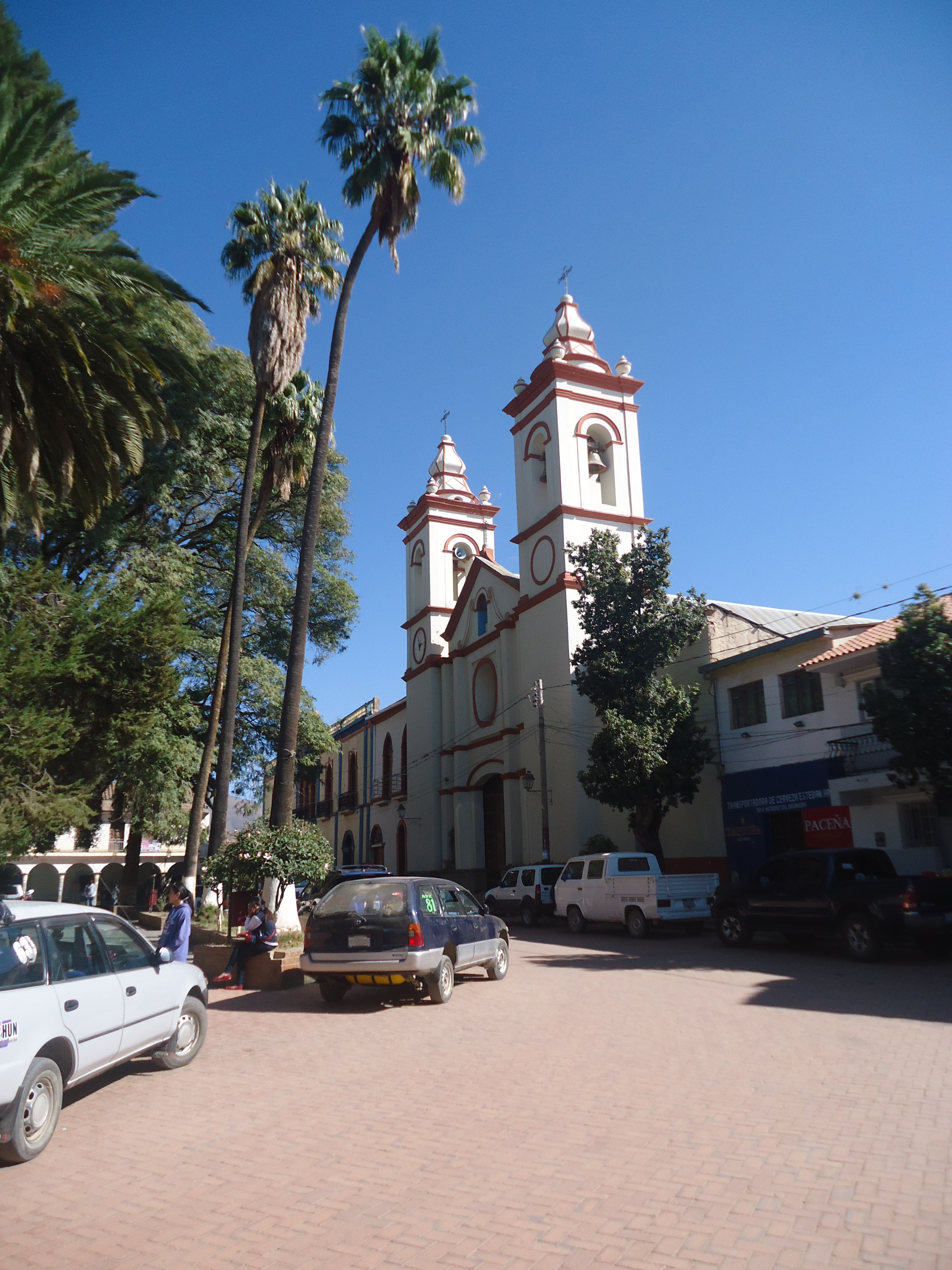
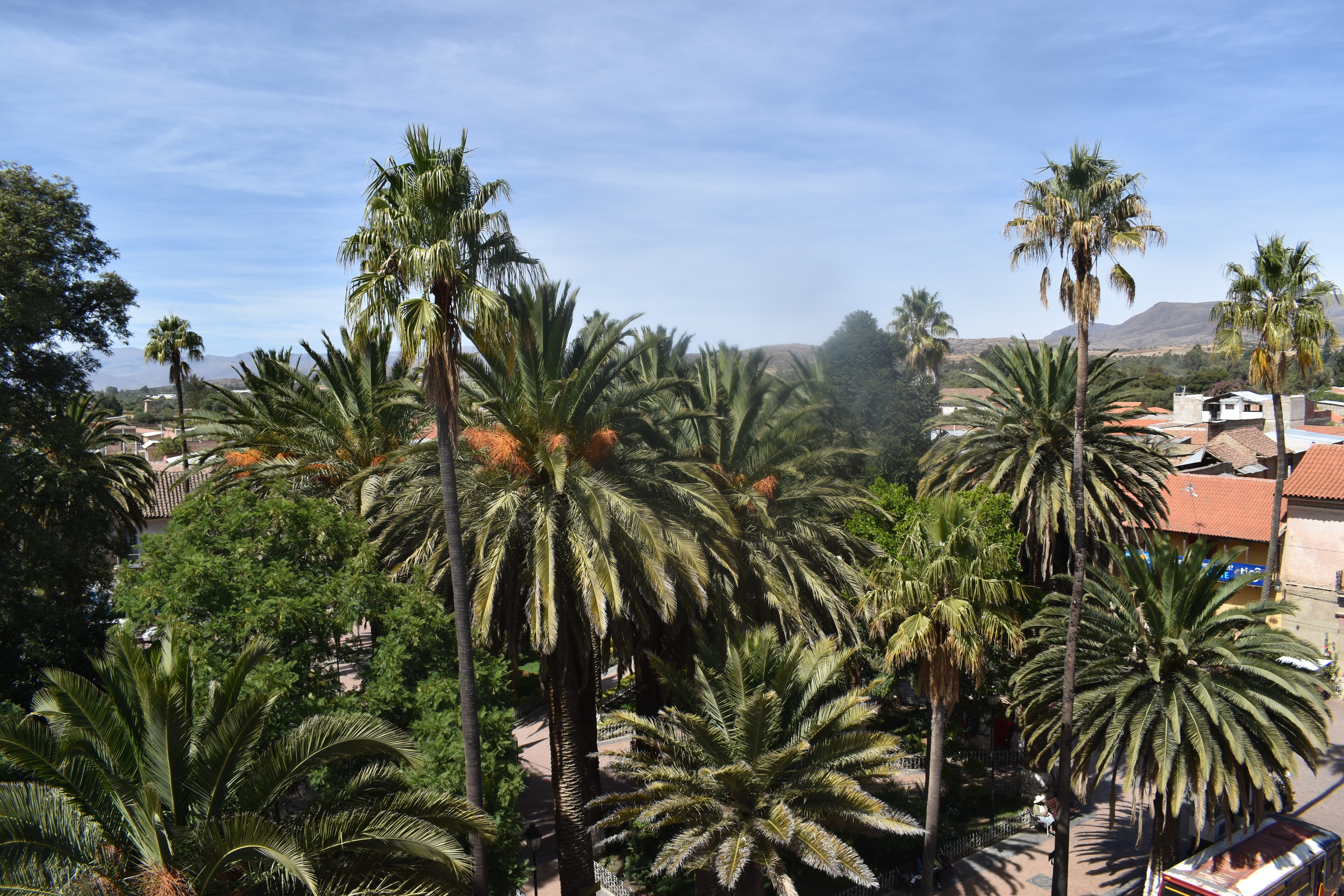
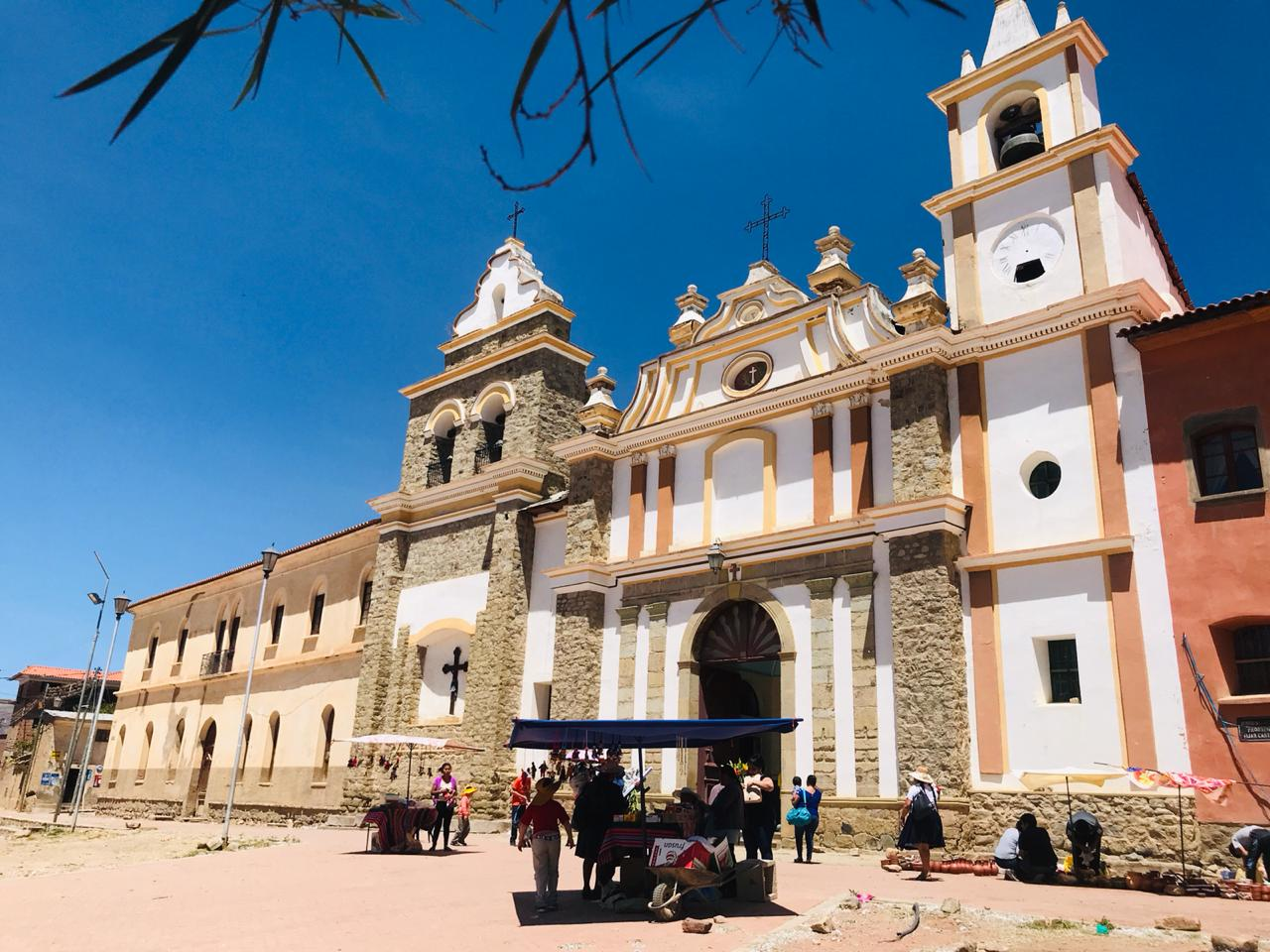
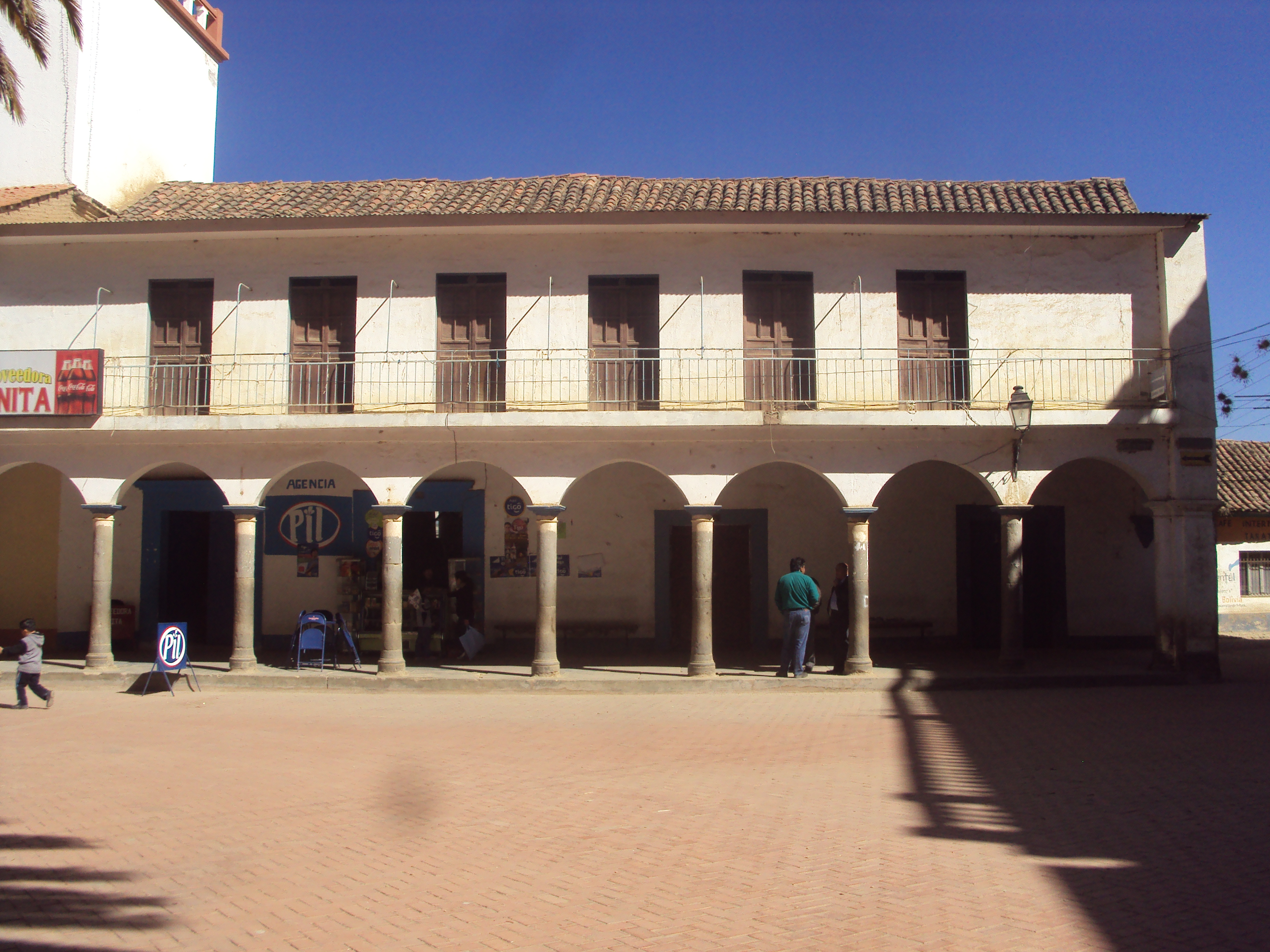
- Scenes of Tarata

- Location in Bolivia
- Coordinates: 17°36′41″S 66°01′24″W
- Country: Bolivia
- Department: Cochabamba Department
- Province: Esteban Arze Province
- Municipality: Tarata Municipality
- Canton: Tarata Canton

Government
  - Mayor: Pedro Hipolito Corrales Prado

Population (2001)
  - Total: 3,323
- Time zone: UTC-4 (BOT)

Tarata is a town in Cochabamba Department, Bolivia. It is the capital of the Esteban Arze Province.

The towns of Arbieto, Santa Rosa, and Tiataco, surround Tarata.

Tarata is known for its home-made cheese and sausage.

== Climate ==
Climate data for Tarata, elevation 2,775 m (9,104 ft)
Month	Jan	Feb	Mar	Apr	May	Jun	Jul	Aug	Sep	Oct	Nov	Dec	Year
Record high °C (°F)	35.0 (95.0)	35.0 (95.0)	36.2 (97.2)	34.8 (94.6)	33.2 (91.8)	32.0 (89.6)	32.8 (91.0)	33.0 (91.4)	33.5 (92.3)	37.5 (99.5)	35.5 (95.9)	35.0 (95.0)	37.5 (99.5)
Mean daily maximum °C (°F)	25.2 (77.4)	25.4 (77.7)	25.9 (78.6)	27.0 (80.6)	26.7 (80.1)	25.8 (78.4)	25.6 (78.1)	26.3 (79.3)	27.0 (80.6)	27.8 (82.0)	27.7 (81.9)	26.6 (79.9)	26.4 (79.6)
Daily mean °C (°F)	17.7 (63.9)	17.9 (64.2)	18.0 (64.4)	17.8 (64.0)	15.8 (60.4)	13.8 (56.8)	13.7 (56.7)	14.9 (58.8)	16.9 (62.4)	18.7 (65.7)	19.1 (66.4)	18.5 (65.3)	16.9 (62.4)
Mean daily minimum °C (°F)	10.2 (50.4)	10.3 (50.5)	10.1 (50.2)	8.6 (47.5)	4.9 (40.8)	1.8 (35.2)	1.8 (35.2)	3.6 (38.5)	6.8 (44.2)	9.5 (49.1)	10.4 (50.7)	10.5 (50.9)	7.4 (45.3)
Record low °C (°F)	2.4 (36.3)	2.5 (36.5)	3.0 (37.4)	−0.1 (31.8)	−4.5 (23.9)	−6.0 (21.2)	−4.5 (23.9)	−5.0 (23.0)	−4.0 (24.8)	−1.0 (30.2)	1.5 (34.7)	2.5 (36.5)	−6.0 (21.2)
Average precipitation mm (inches)	159.6 (6.28)	117.8 (4.64)	93.5 (3.68)	21.9 (0.86)	2.5 (0.10)	2.7 (0.11)	2.0 (0.08)	4.1 (0.16)	12.5 (0.49)	26.1 (1.03)	59.6 (2.35)	111.7 (4.40)	614 (24.18)
Average precipitation days	13.4	10.6	8.3	2.6	0.7	0.4	0.4	1.0	2.1	3.9	6.4	9.9	59.7
Source: Servicio Nacional de Meteorología e Hidrología de Bolivia

== Notable residents ==
- Mariano Melgarejo (1820–1871), President of Bolivia
- René Barrientos (1919–1969), President of Bolivia
- Julia Iriarte (1920–2015), track and field athlete
