= Severo Melgarejo =

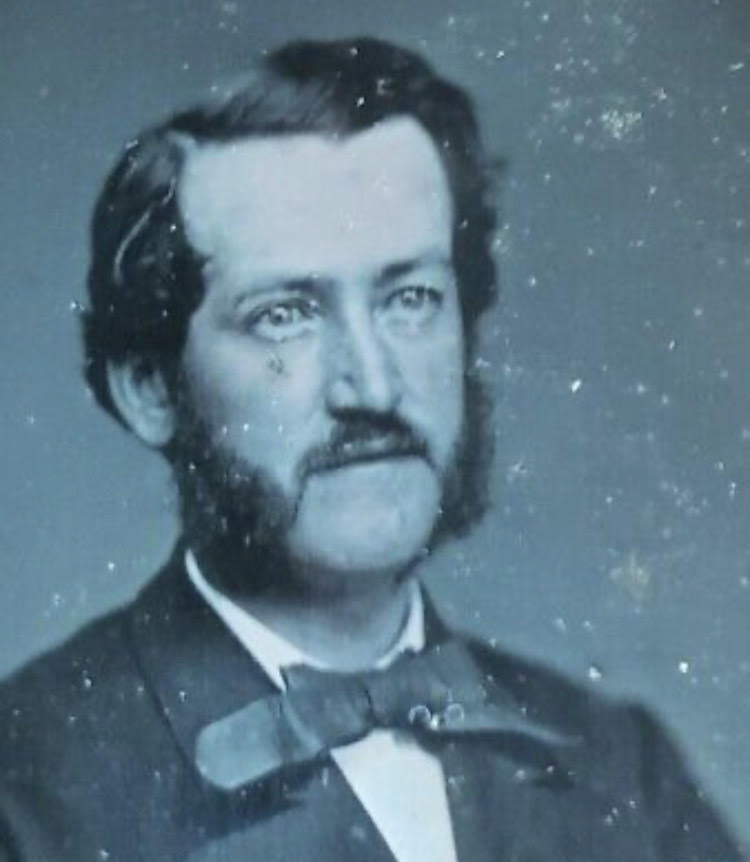

Personal details
- Born: Severo Miguel Melgarejo Rojas; January 10, 1842 Cochabamba, Bolivia
- Died: March 3, 1905 (aged 63) Santiago, Chile
- Spouse(s): Rosaura Sánchez; Helena Allende
- Children: Alfonso Melgarejo Sánchez; Daniel Melgarejo Allende; Margarita Melgarejo Allende; Eulalia Melgarejo Allende
- Parent(s): Mariano Melgarejo; Simona Cuenca
- Occupation: Military officer, Businessman

Military service
- Branch/service: Bolivian Army
- Rank: General

Severo Melgarejo Rojas (10 January 1842 - 3 March 1905) was a Bolivian military officer, business man and guano magnate. He was the son of the President of Bolivia, Mariano Melgarejo, and woman from the city of Tarija, Simona Cuenca. He was considered a traitor by most Bolivians of his day on account of his taking Chilean citizenship.

== Early life ==
=== Birth and youth ===
Melgarejo was born in Cochabamba, Bolivia, on January 10, 1842. He was the second son of future Bolivian president Mariano Melgarejo. His father was absent throughout the majority of his life so he was raised by his mother. He spent most of his youth in Tarata, where he grew close to Manuel Terrazas, a military officer during the War of the Pacific. The one influence his father did have in his life was his entrance into the Bolivian Army when Melgarejo was fourteen in 1856.

In 1857, his father rose to prominence due to his key role in the overthrow of President Jorge Córdova, after which a grateful José María Linares personally promoted him to the rank of colonel. His father again played a crucial role in the overthrow of the man he had previously aided, President Linares. After which President José María de Achá promoted his father to General. It was during the Achá presidency, Melgarejo graduated from the Military College of the Army in La Paz with the rank of second lieutenant. He was noted, in juxtaposition to his father, as a generous and calm man.

=== Son of the president ===
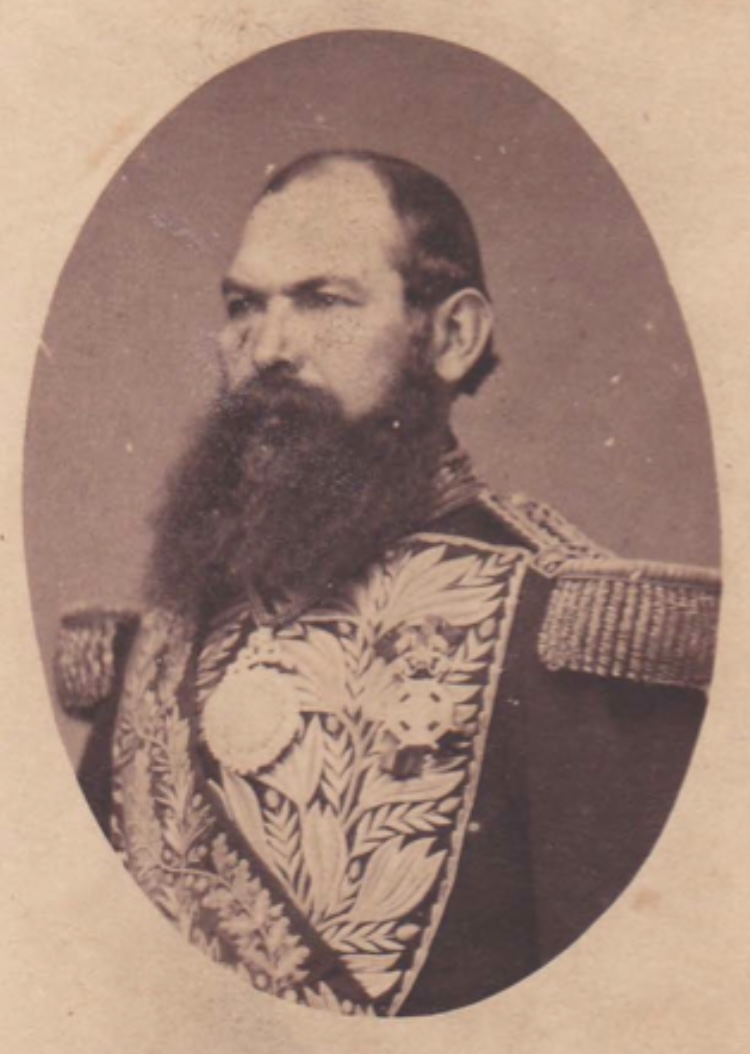
Mariano Melgarejo, father of Severo Melgarejo, and President of Bolivia between 1864 and 1871.

Just as Mariano Melgarejo had help toppling Córdova and Linares, he would now directly depose President Achá. With his father now in power, one would think he would have every benefit. However, the only thing his father would do for his son during his presidency was to promote him to colonel, and later general, and marry him to the sister of his mistress, Rosaura Sánchez. Although a general in the Bolivian Army, Melgarejo did not do much and mostly served his father's interests. In reality, Severo Melgarejo had no choice nor say.

== After the Presidency of Mariano Melgarejo ==
=== Land owner and controversy ===
Once Mariano Melgarejo was ousted in 1871, Severo Melgarejo remained in Bolivia. In fact, unlike his now deposed father, he was to become a relatively wealthy business owner. Although forcibly retired from the army by Agustín Morales, Melgarejo was allowed stay in the country. By 1873, he was the owner of rights on the guano rich areas Tocopilla, and was involved in several legal disputes regarding the lands of the former Litoral Department, now Antofagasta, Chile. He would also be the owner of several lands and businesses in Paraguay.

Because the transfer of the former Bolivian Litoral to Chile was just taking place, questions of citizenship and property rights began arising. Melgarejo, as a land owner, was involved in these conflicts. Because he was the owner of such a vast amount of land and rights to exploit natural resources in the region, the Chilean government decided to grant him Chilean citizenship. The Bolivian press vilified Melgarejo, slandering his name as a traitor and the son of Bolivia's worst president.

His wife, Rosaura, had abandoned Melgarejo and joined the rest of her clan in Lima, leaving their son as well. They were finally divorced in 1881, by which time Melgarejo was already engaged to marry a Chilean aristocrat, Helena Allende.

=== Self-exile and death ===
Unwelcome by his hostile native land, Melgarejo opted to move to Santiago, where the headquarters of his business empire would be based. He was to spend the rest of his life away from Bolivia.

Severo Melgarejo died on March 3, 1905, in the capital city of Chile, Santiago. He died considered a traitor by the people of his country and forever carried the negative legacy of his father with him.

== Personal life ==
Melgarejo was married to the sister of Juana and Aurelio Sánchez, Rosaura, with whom he had one child: Alfonso (1870-1935). After she abandoned him and their son. The marriage was annulled later and Melgarejo married his second wife, Helena Allende. They would have three children: Daniel (1883-1954), Margarita (1885-1921), and Eulalia (1888-1967).
