= Mariano Melgarejo =

15th president of Bolivia

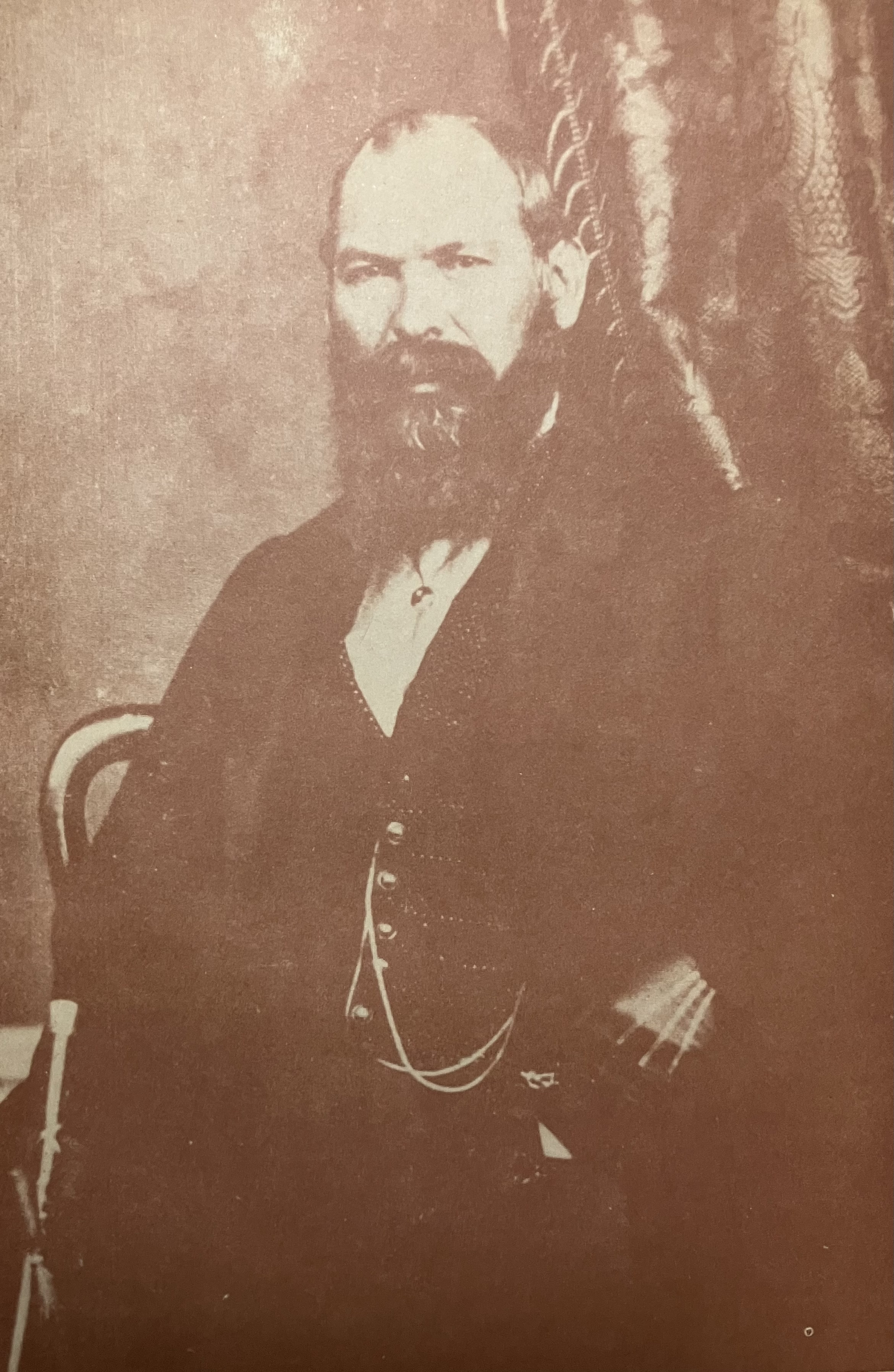

15th President of Bolivia
- In office 28 December 1864 – 15 January 1871; Provisional: 28 December 1864 – 15 August 1870
- Preceded by: José María de Achá
- Succeeded by: Agustín Morales

Personal details
- Born: Manuel Mariano Melgarejo Valencia; 13 April 1820 Tarata, United Provinces of the Río de la Plata
- Died: 23 November 1871 (aged 51) Lima, Peru
- Cause of death: Assassination
- Spouse: Rosa Rojas
- Domestic partner: Juana Sánchez
- Children: Federico Melgarejo Rojas; Severo Melgarejo Rojas; Valentina Melgarejo
- Parent(s): Ignacio Valencia; Lorenza Melgarejo
- Awards: Order of the Southern Cross
- Nickname(s): Capitán del Siglo (Captain of the Century), Héroe de Diciembre (December Hero)

Military service
- Allegiance: Bolivia
- Branch/service: Bolivian Army
- Rank: General
- Battles/wars: War of the Confederation; Peruvian-Bolivian War

Manuel Mariano Melgarejo Valencia (13 April 1820 – 23 November 1871) was a Bolivian military officer and politician who served as the fifteenth president of Bolivia from 28 December 1864, until his fall on 15 January 1871.

He assumed power in 1864 after staging a coup d'état against president José María de Achá, thus beginning six-year dictatorship, popularly known as the Sexenio. He would cement his power after personally killing former president Manuel Isidoro Belzu in 1865. He was of controversial personality and his dictatorship is remembered in Bolivia mainly for its poor government administration and its abuses against the indigenous population, in addition to having signed unfavorable border treaties with Chile and Brazil in 1866 and 1867, which proved to be devastating in coming years.

On 15 January 1871, the Commander-in-Chief of the Army at the time, General Agustín Morales, along with the support of the people of La Paz, tired of the president's despotic actions for almost seven years, rose up against Melgarejo and deposed him. With the people having risen against Melgarejo, a bloody battle ensued in the city of La Paz which has been considered one of the fiercest and most terrible battles in Bolivian history. At the end of that day, the uprising triumphed over government troops, thus managing ending the Melgarejo regime.

Once ousted from power, Melgarejo fled Bolivia for Chile, where he stayed for a few months. While in Santiago de Chile, he learned that Juana Sánchez, his lover, was living in the city of Lima, Peru. Consequently, Melgarejo decided to leave for that country, but, once he arrived in Lima, he was shot to death on 23 November 1871, by Juana's brother, José Aurelio Sánchez.

== Early life ==
He was born on 13 April 1820, in the town of Tarata, current department of Cochabamba, Bolivia; then belonging to the territory of the Viceroyalty of Peru. He was the son of mestiza Ignacia Melgarejo and the Spaniard José Linares. When he was born, his father did not recognize him as his legitimate son and abandoned him. For this reason, Melgarejo had to take the surname of his mother, who raised him during his childhood. Melgarejo grew up with his mother and spent his childhood in a humble home in the small town of Tarata; his house still remains today.

== Personal life ==
Melgarejo was married to Rosa Rojas, the member of a middle-class family. Together, they had two sons: Federico (1840–1872) and Severo (1842–1905). His younger son was married to Rosaura Sánchez, the sister of Juana and Aurelio Sánchez. Melgarejo was constantly disloyal to his wife, who is often excluded from history and rarely mentioned.

== Military career ==
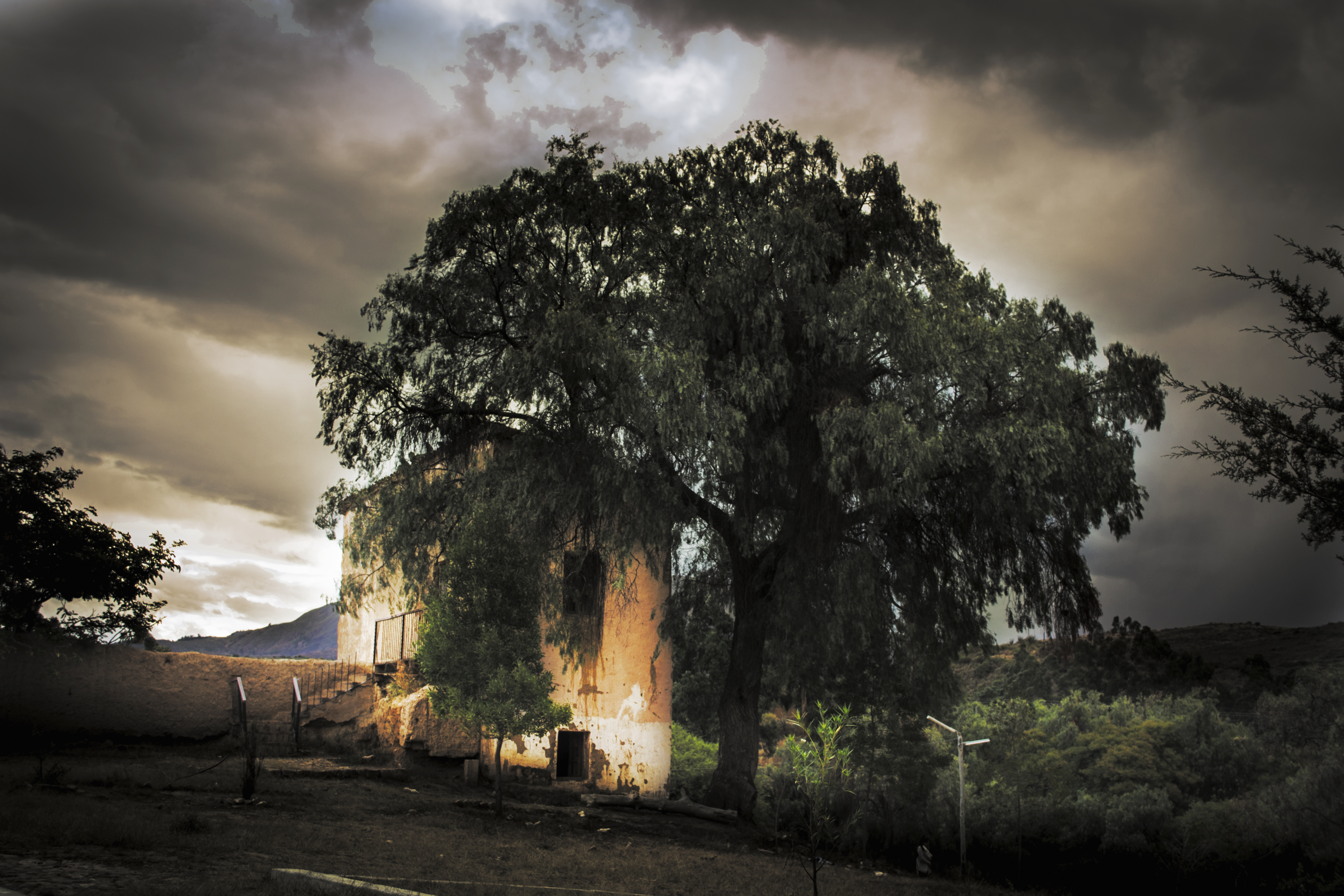
Melgarejo's childhood home in Tarta.

Melgarejo began his military career in the city of Cochabamba at a very young age. He entered the army at the age of 16, joining in 1836 with the rank of private. Melgarejo was present in many different battles during the War of the Confederation, during which the government of Andrés de Santa Cruz. At the end of the war in 1839, he was promoted to the rank of sergeant.

In 1841, at the age of 21, Melgarejo participated in the battle of Ingavi, a clash between Bolivia and Peru while he was a sergeant under the command of José Ballivián Segurola. During the battle, Melgarejo managed to demonstrate his heroism and bravery on the battlefield, for which the Bolivian government promoted him to the rank of second lieutenant.

After Ingavi, Ballivián kept the young soldier Melgarejo by his side, with the aim of protecting his government against future military uprisings by the opposition. It is worth mentioning that President Ballivián saw defects in the young soldier, which is why he kept him assigned to the borders, due to Melgarejo's conduct and dangerous behavior caused by his fondness and abuse of alcohol.

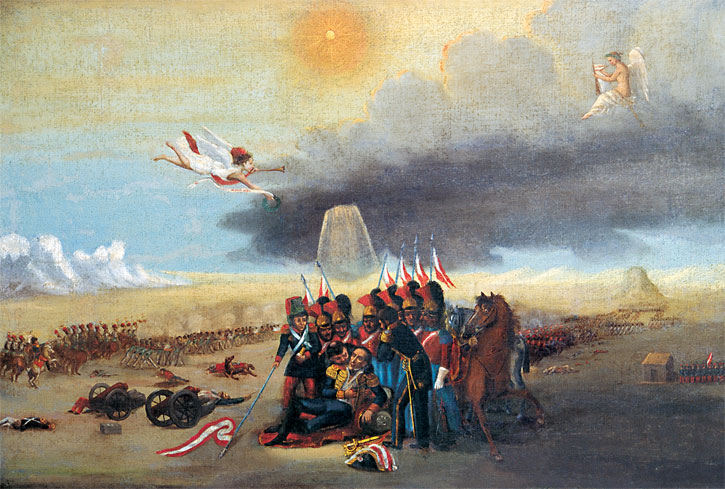
The death of Marshal Agustín Gamarra at the Battle of Ingavi.

During his military career, Melgarejo managed to rise in the military hierarchy through the adulation of his superiors, his willingness to participate in rebellions and in some isolated acts of courage. Unlike other soldiers of his time, Melgarejo was characterized for being poorly educated, but always willful.

=== Promotions ===
- In 1836, he entered the Bolivian army with the rank of soldier (at the age of 16).
- In 1839, he was promoted to the rank of sergeant (aged 19).
- In 1841, he was promoted to the rank of second lieutenant by José Ballivián himself after his heroic displays during the Battle of Ingavi (21 years old).
- In 1846, he was promoted to the rank of first lieutenant (26 years old).
- In 1850, he rose to the rank of captain (at the age of 30).
- In 1855, he was promoted to the rank of major (at the age of 35).
- In 1857, he was promoted to the rank of lieutenant colonel (at the age of 37).
- In 1859, the president of Bolivia, José María Linares, personally promoted Melgarejo to the rank of colonel, in gratitude for having helped him overthrow former president Jorge Córdova (at the age of 39).
- In 1862, the president of Bolivia, José María de Achá, personally promoted Melgarejo to the rank of army general (at the age of 42), in gratitude for having helped him overthrow former president José María Linares. This is the maximum degree that can be reached within the Bolivian army. In just 26 years, Mariano Melgarejo went from being a simple soldier (in 1836) to being the general of the entire Bolivian Army (in 1862).

== Political career ==
=== Death sentence and presidential pardon ===
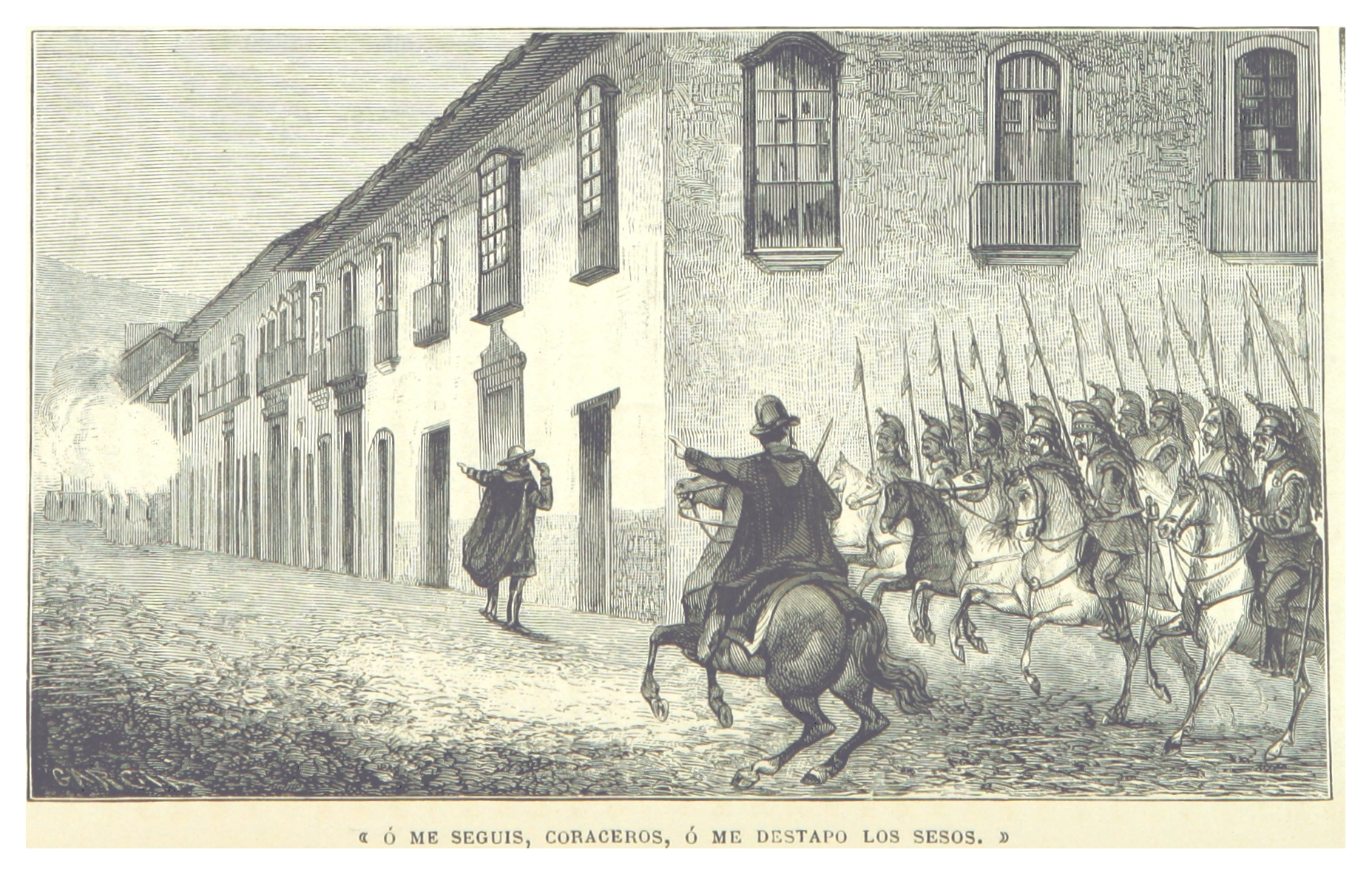
"Either you follow me, cuirassiers, or I blow my brains out!", an infamous harangue of Melgarejo during his imminent takeover in 1864.

In 1854, Melgarejo appears for the first time on the public and political scene of Bolivia. At the beginning of that year, he mutinied with his troops after carrying out a military uprising in the city of Santa Cruz de la Sierra, pronouncing himself against the government of President Manuel Isidoro Belzu, but his revolt was quickly crushed by government troops, being captured and immediately taken to the city of Cochabamba to stand trial. During his trial, Melgarejo was tried and charged with high treason and armed uprising against the Bolivian state and was sentenced to death.

When Melgarejo was awaiting his execution by firing squad (as befitted the military officers of that time), some ladies from the high society of Cochabamba (very close friends of his) met in person with President Belzu at the Palacio Quemado to plead for the life of the prisoner. They justified his actions of revolt and military uprising to his alcoholism.

President Manuel Isidoro Belzu, agreeing to the request, spared the life of Melgarejo, but later, in a prophetic way, told the women of Cochabamba that "one day they would regret" asking for mercy for the life of a womanizing and drunk military officer. After the presidential pardon, Melgarejo was released and continued his military career in the Bolivian Army.

Paradoxically, among the various ladies who asked for Melgarejo's life was the mother of the prestigious Bolivian poet and politician Néstor Galindo, who eleven years later in 1865, would be cruelly shot fighting in the Battle of the Cantería de Potosí against the Melgarejo government.

=== Political conspiracies ===
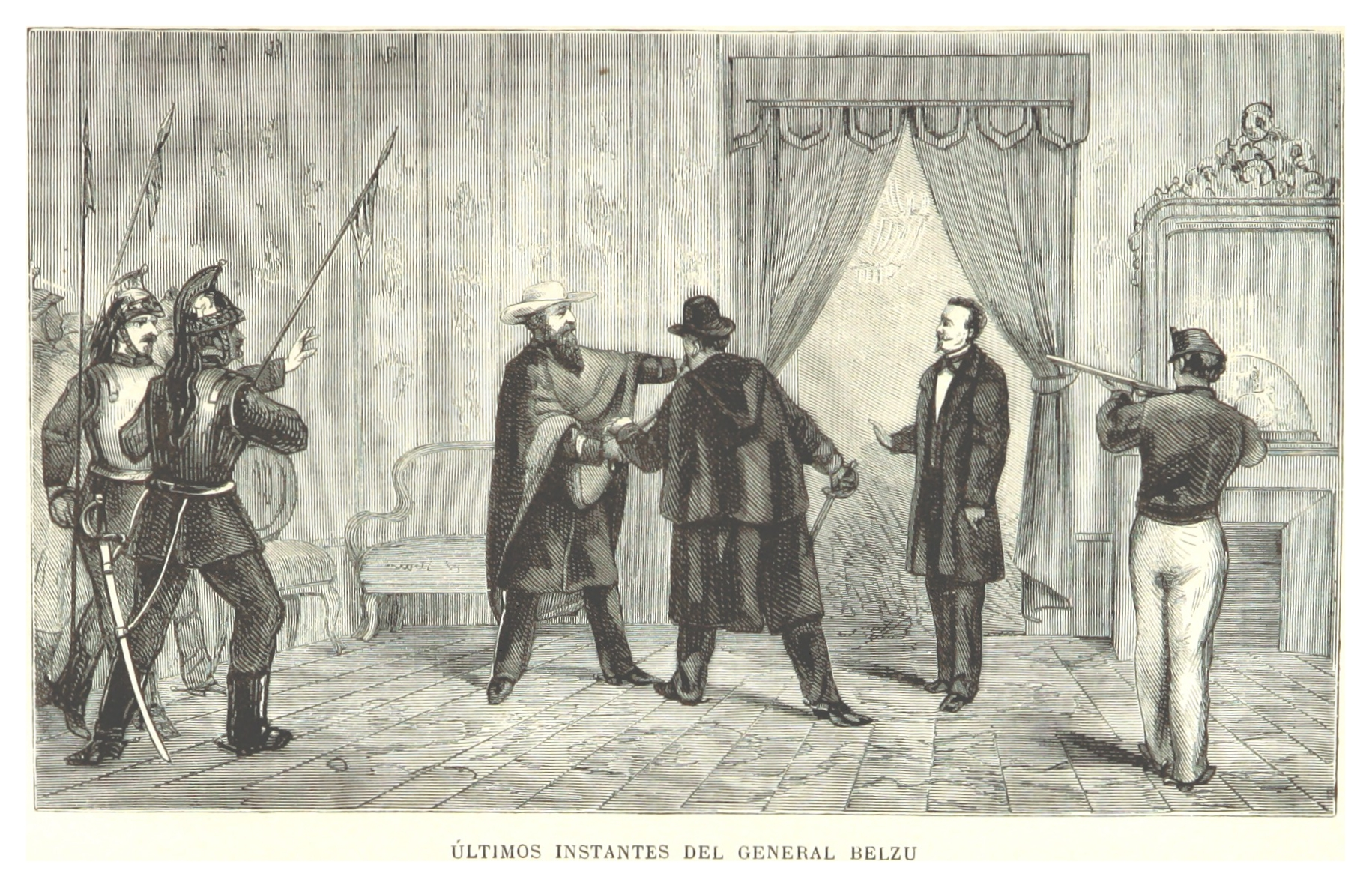
The assassination of Manuel Isidoro Belzu at the hands of Melgarejo.

After his military revolt in 1854, Melgarejo acquired a certain notoriety and a moderate leadership among the army troops. The governments of presidents Jorge Córdova (1855–1857) and José María Linares (1857–1861), considered him dangerous and kept him stationed at distant locations in the borderlands, far from the main cities. Doing so, Córdova and Linares regimes hoped to isolate Melgarejo and prevent him from influencing soldiers and officers with his alcoholism and immorality and, at the same time, also avoid future military uprisings.

During the government of President Córdova (1855–1857), Melgarejo already held the rank of lieutenant colonel. During that time he openly supported the conspiracies of politician José María Linares had and aided the civilian cause to overthrow Córdova. In September 1857, together with Colonel Plácido Yáñez, he rose up in favor of Linares during the coup d'état that ousted Córdova. Organizing and commanding the barricades in the city of Cochabamba, Melgarejo played a crucial role in the defeat of President Jorge Córdova who was overthrown after the Battle of Cochabamba. Linares rose to the presidency of Bolivia and, thankful for Melgarejo's support, promoted Melgarejo to the rank of colonel in 1859.

During the first months of the Linares regime, Melgarejo supported him openly. However, years later he rose up against him in rebellion and was crucial yet again in the overthrow of a president. Once Linares was overthrown in 1861, the former Minister of War, José María de Achá, rose to the presidency. During the coup, Melgarejo changed sides and, with Achá's victory, openly supported the new regime.

=== Rise to power ===
He crushed countless uprisings and rebellions on behalf of President Achá, who in return gave him his friendship and total trust, promoting Melgarejo to the rank of army general in 1862. At the beginning of the year 1864, a rumor spread in Bolivian society about the infidelity of President Achá's wife with General Melgarejo.

Upon discovering they were indeed lovers, the morale and health of President Achá seriously declined, as well losing respect from the army, being discredited by the opposition as a cuckold. His wife would die suddenly weeks later, also afflicted by a serious illness in August 1864.

== Presidency (1864–1871) ==
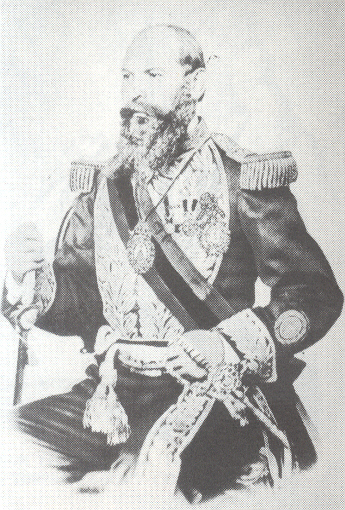
Mariano Melgarejo as President of Bolivia (1864–1871).

In December 1864, taking advantage of the delicate health of President Achá, Melgarejo revolted against him, and, together with his troops, carried out a coup against the government. By this point, the unpopular government was ruling over a chaotic and anarchic land, making Melgarejo's task far simpler. Melgarejo rose to the Presidency of Bolivia on 28 December 1864, at the age of forty-four.

=== The Constitutionalist Uprising of 1865-1865 ===
==== The early rebellion ====
Even after Belzu had been eliminated, Melgarejo still faced widespread discontent from several sector of society and would face nearly a year of rebellions by a collective group called "Constitutionalists". Having seized power only in December 1864, less than a month later Melgarejo clashed with rebel forces in Tacaquira, located in the southern area of the Chuquisaca Department, on 24 January 1865. The rebels would win this encounter, facing government troops again in a bigger battle on the banks of the Oscara River on 3 February and ultimately retreating.

==== The assassination of Manuel Isidoro Belzu ====
To Melgarejo's dismay, former President Manuel Isidoro Belzu, who was exiled in Europe, returned to Bolivia to dispute the rise of General Melgarejo, finally sparking a full civil war. On 22 March 1865, Belzu's army defeated the government forces in La Paz with the help of the popular masses. On 27 March, Melgarejo attacked La Paz with his army but was defeated, with several of his men choosing to side with Belzu.

However, as soon as Belzu entered the Palacio Quemado for the meeting, Melgarejo and his men murdered him. New investigations have come up with the theory that since Melgarejo's revolver failed (the seller found out that only 1 bullet came out of 5 shots), then the bullet that killed Belzu came from the revolver of some soldier who was behind him. Regardless of what happened that fateful day, Belzu was killed and Melgarejo had eliminated a huge threat to his government.

According to legend, when Melgarejo's presence was known, a crowd gathered in the Plaza Murillo, located in front of the Bolivian Government Palace, cheering Belzu's name. However, Melgarejo appeared on a balcony instead and announced, "Belzu is dead. Who lives now?" and the crowd gave a bestial cry: "Long live Melgarejo!"

==== The May uprising ====
Only two months after Belzu had been defeated and killed, on 25 May another Constitutionalist revolt broke out in La Paz. A week later, on 1 June, a committee was established in Oruro and proclaimed a revolution. The rebels managed to capture the government palace and, two days later, the garrison of Chayanta also rose up against Melgarejo. On 8 June, the Constitutionalists sent an army toward Oruro in the south, being defeated on 1 July by Melgarejo's troops. With Oruro now occupied by the government forces, Melgarejo still was unable to end the anarchy, facing rebellion in many more areas of the country. La Paz, Oruro, and Chayanta joined to create a board to lead the revolution and foment the spread of it to other cities and towns. Very quickly, Potosí, Sucre, Cobija, Tarija, and Cochabamba would join. Although all seemed lost for Melgarejo, by 8 August, he was able to recapture Sucre, Cochabamba, and Potosí. Generals Ildefonso Sanjinés and Nicanor Flores had been competing for leadership, resulting in the forestalling of rebel operations and allowing Melgarejo to exploit this weakness. On Septiember 5, Flores decided to lead an attack against the government forces, however, was defeated and was forced to flee to Argentina. On 25 October Santa Cruz declared itself in support of the revolution. However, on 22 November the government had retaken the city after a brief skirmish. The northern rebels, under the command of General Casto Arguedas, decided to launch an offensive which was ultimately defeated and hastily retreated to Viacha. On 24 January 1866, Melgarejo and his trusted second in command, Quintín Quevedo, met the remainder of the rebels in the hill of Letanias, scoring a major victory and achieving the unconditional surrender of the Constitutionalist rebels.

=== Administration ===
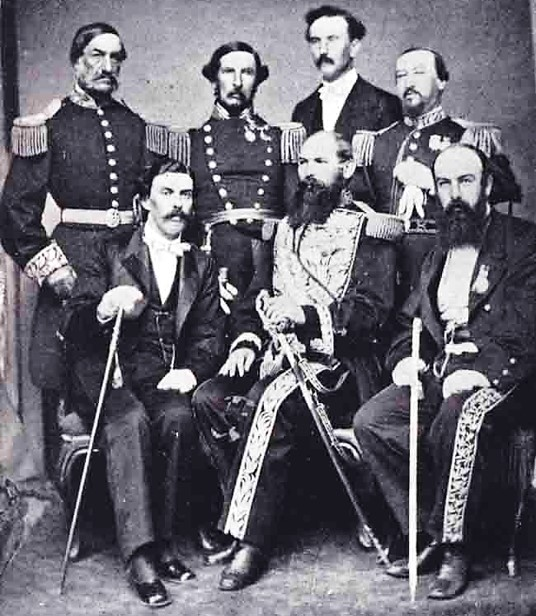
Melgarejo and his cabinet c. 1868.

After proclaiming himself president of Bolivia, Melgarejo proceeded to govern without rivals but with great incompetence. One of his first measures was to violently suppress the opposition and annul the traditional rights of the indigenous population, declaring that the communal lands of the native communities would be property of the State. He then ordered the violent eviction of the communities to grant the lands to allied landowners, an aggression that had not even been carried out during Spanish rule. He also abolished municipalities and local governments, refusing to appoint mayors.

Melgarejo entrusted the public administration to his chancellor, a young lawyer named Mariano Donato Muñoz, especially in foreign policy. Shortly after assuming power, he was visited by a young woman who belonged to a wealthy family from La Paz named Juana Sánchez. She had come to Melgarejo to ask for clemency for the life of her brother Aurelio Sánchez, who had been sentenced to death. Melgarejo not only spare his life, but also took Juana Sánchez as his concubine after holding her hostage in the Palacio Quemado for three consecutive days. Madly in love with the young woman (who succumbed to the personality of the general), Melgarejo gave her and her family great influence in the government, which the Sánchez family took advantage of, enriching themselves at the expense of the treasury.

Melgarejo's government turned out to be increasingly erratic and unstable. While the dictator spent much of his time in orgies with Juana Sánchez, who was as lustful as the general himself and also addicted to alcohol, her family dominated politics and the governing of the nation. In 1866, Melgarejo signed a border treaty with Chile, establishing the common border but recognizing all Chilean commercial interests in the exploitation of saltpeter on the Bolivian coast of Antofagasta. This practically left Bolivia without any compensation other than the right to collect taxes in their own territory. Later, in 1867, he negotiated with the Empire of Brazil the sale of 102,400 km^{2} of Bolivian territory (from the Acre region) through the Treaty of Ayacucho. This in exchange for the payment of two million pounds sterling and the Brazilian commitment to build the Madeira railway in the Mamoré region. In 1868, Melgarejo promulgated a new constitution, granting himself omnimodal powers over public administration and attributing to his position the power to "persecute and kill opponents". The promulgation ceremony ended with a banquet and consequent orgy where he made Juana Sánchez participate totally naked.

==== War of the Triple Alliance (1864–1870) ====
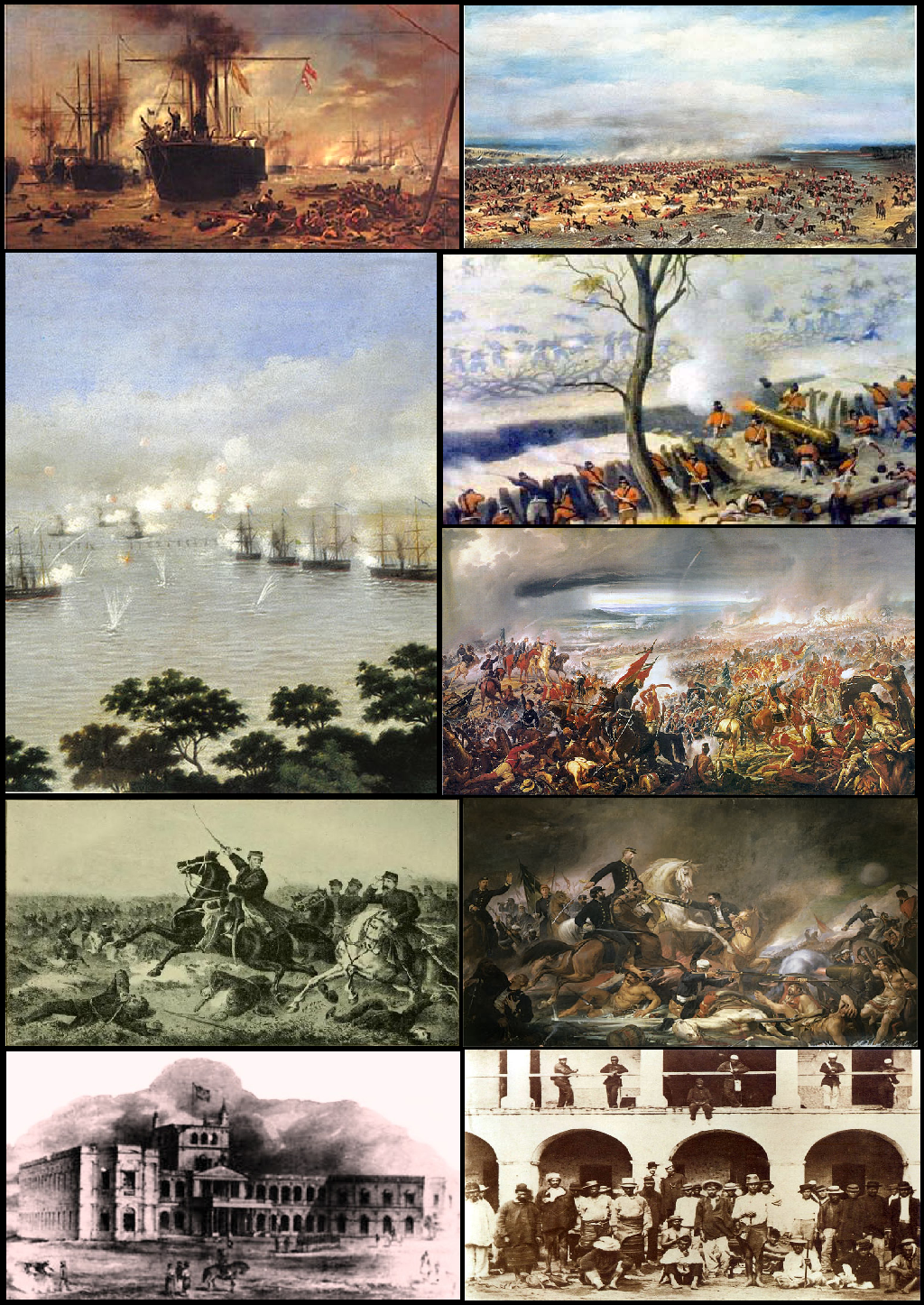
Scenes from the War of the Triple Alliance.

In 1864, Paraguay had been invaded by Brazil, Argentina and Uruguay in what is known as the War of the Triple Alliance. Melgarejo expressed solidarity with Paraguay, giving his full support to this nation. But his supposed support remained only in words, since Melgarejo in fact maintained a neutral stance and never mobilized troops to help Paraguay.

==== Franco-Prussian War (1870) ====
In July 1870, when Prussia invaded France, starting the Franco-Prussian War, Melgarejo asked one of his high-ranking generals to immediately send Bolivian troops to help the French army defend Paris. This was city that Melgarejo was fascinated by with its stories of sophistication and elegance but which he did not even know how to locate on a map. The Bolivian general replied that the plan was impossible, since it would take a long time to cross the Atlantic Ocean. Enraged, Melgarejo replied, "Don't be silly! We'll take a shortcut!"

Blinded by anger, Melgarejo arranged to gather a troop of 3,000 men to embark for Europe and help France. Attending a horse race in Oruro, he suffered a broken foot that stopped him for a month, and planned to cross the Amazon jungles of Brazil to reach the Atlantic Ocean and reach Europe. Resuming his march, Melgarejo received news that France had already capitulated to Prussia but he refused to believe such events. In mid-November, he was informed that Great Britain was expelling Bolivian residents from British soil and refusing to recognize the existence of Bolivia in retaliation for the British ambassador to Bolivia having been expelled by Melgarejo from the country, giving him a beating shortly before doing so. While this occurred, the city of Potosí revolted against the government.

=== Downfall ===
Alarmed, Melgarejo attacked Potosí and crushed the revolt through a series of massacres and cruelties, but soon he learned that, taking advantage of his absence, La Paz, Cochabamba, and other major cities had also joined in a general uprising. Melgarejo gathered his troops and marched on La Paz, but soon his men began to desert en masse. Finally, on 15 January 1871, his battered army, under the command of José María Calderón, was completely defeated by the Commander of the Army, General Agustín Morales.

Author Moisés Alcázar describes the jubilant sentiment of the Bolivian people after Melgarejo's overthrow:

Melgarejo's star had definitively died out. Bolivia jubilantly celebrated its liberation, taking in happily the awakening from a terrible nightmare, determined to return to normality, and to reverse the values invested in the dark and mournful times [of Melgarejo's regime] because the world has to regain its balance. In the history of humanity, power is nothing more than frequent alternative. Life is stronger than despotism and errors, and sometimes, gently or painfully, order and progress are restored, without which the existence of peoples would be impossible. Because good is imperative for superior souls, dignifying the human species. The malignant ends by being irretrievably defeated and devastated, although the brutality is supported by force, which is also transitory and variable. And there will be jubilant mornings like that of January 15, 1871, as there will be Melgarejos and crime and barbarism blocks, although only for a short time, the sun of Liberty.

Melgarejo was abandoned to his fate and, lacking troops and allies, had to flee to Chile. Almost in misery, Melgarejo learned in Chile that Juana Sánchez and her family had fled to Lima with part of their wealth. The ousted dictator managed to borrow money and went to Lima in search of his former partner. However, Juana Sánchez refused to receive the bankrupt Melgarejo at her residence, who spent days in front of the building crying out to be admitted by his former concubine. Finally, Melgarejo was shot dead on 23 November of the same year in front of Juana's house, at the hands of the man he had pardoned, Juana's brother, Aurelio Sánchez.

== Legacy ==
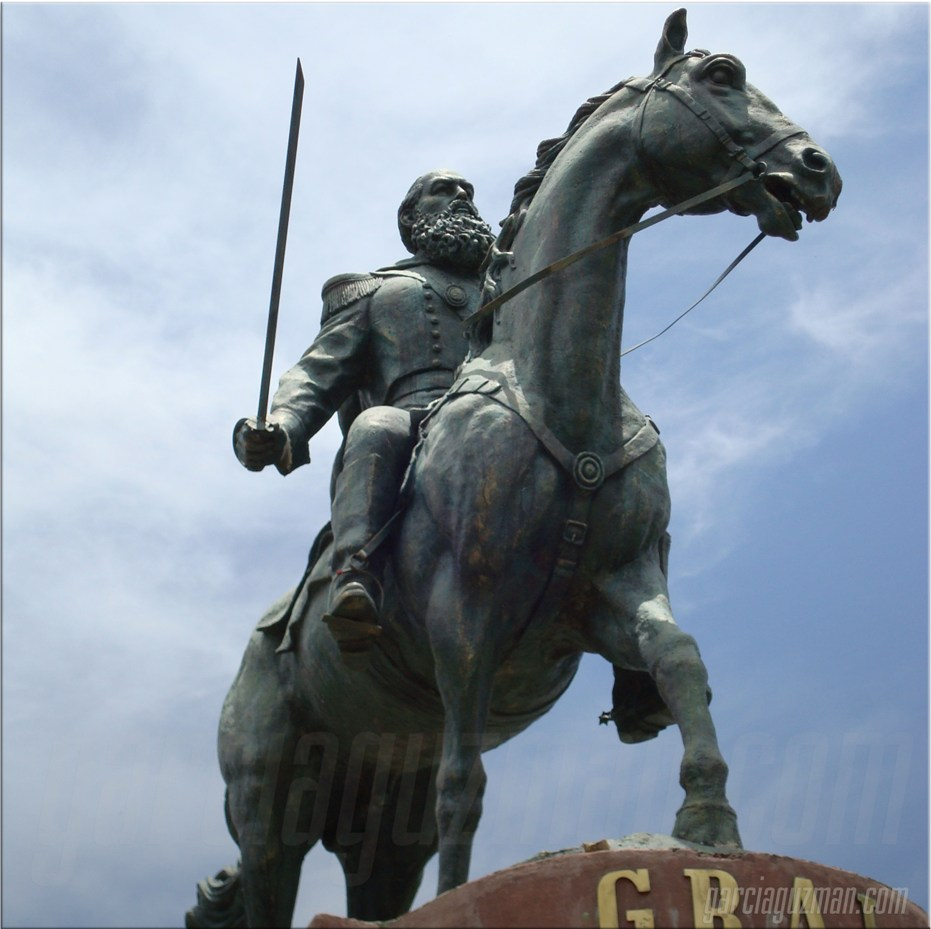
Equestrian statue in honor of Mariano Melgarejo.

As president, Melgarejo was notorious for his erratic behavior. He ruthlessly suppressed the opposition, violently crushing protests and dispossessing the country's indigenous population of their land. Melgarejo worked on behalf of a new mining elite in Bolivia, during a period of resurgent silver production and investment from Chile, Peru, North America, England and European capitalists. Despite the rising prices of guano and nitrates on the international market, the government of Bolivia faced recurring financial problems throughout Melgarejo's tenure.

Melgarejo's almost reckless courage and brutal stubbornness are the materials on which legends feed. In the popular anecdotes still in circulation today, 150 years after his death, his deeds, or rather misdeeds, are widely discussed.

Melgarejo was said to have given an immense amount of land to Brazil in exchange for what he described as a "magnificent white horse". The stories say that a Brazilian minister appeared before Melgarejo with a white horse and other gifts. To show his appreciation, Melgarejo took a map of Bolivia, marked it with the horse's hoof, and gave that land, hotly contested by indigenous Bolivians, as a gift to the Brazilian government. This and other incidents, such as the possession and sale of land in the altiplano (high plateau) to the highest bidder which deprived virtually all indigenous people of their land within a few decades, are among the most famous.

His literacy and intelligence is also constantly questioned and analyzed. It is said that Melgarejo, who did not know how to read, took a newspaper, but in reverse. When the guard informed him about his mistake, Melgarejo replied: "Damn! He who knows how to read, just reads."

The loyalty that his subordinates had for him was mixed with fear: on one occasion, while at a social gathering on the second floor of the Palacio Quemado, he called his presidential guard and ordered them to march straight ahead. When the soldiers reached the balcony of the palace, they had to continue marching until they fell to the ground in the Plaza Murillo. It is said that there were some fractures, but no deaths. If they had disobeyed Melgarejo's direct order, another fate would have awaited them.

However, there is more to Melgarejo than simply a mad despot who ruled with terror. Tomas O'Connor D'Arlach describes Melgarejo as follows:

Many have compared him with the tyrants of Paraguay and the Argentine Republic, even with those of ancient Rome. We who judge him calmly - sine amore nec odio - and with the severe impartiality of history, do not see in Melgarejo a scheming and gloomy tyrant like Tiberius, nor the forlorn, suspecting and neurotic Dr. Francia, nor the madly bloodthirsty Rosas. All we see in him is... an ingenuously good man in whom passion, sensual instincts and organic compulsion had driven out the seeds of virtue that a careful education might have salvaged. As a man, as a president, he exercised absolutely no influence on the political life of Bolivia because he represented no idea or party... He was a true soldier, ignorant of civil law and appreciative only of physical force.

Currently, in the Church of Tarata, there is a skull embedded in one of its walls that is attributed to be that of Melgarejo. A popular belief is that this skull can grant wishes to whoever asks for them.

== Political views ==
Compared to other dictators of Bolivia at the time, Melgarejo was different and supported capitalist economic policies. Mariano Melgarejo, attempted to privatize communal landholdings in the 1860s. He also advocated for militarism.

The growing strength of liberal ideologues can be seen even during the notorious regime of Mariano Melgarejo, when the government used liberal ideology.

Political offices
Preceded by José María de Achá	President of Bolivia; 1864–1871	Succeeded by Agustín Morales
