= Anzaldo Municipality =

- Municipality
- Location of the Anzaldo Municipality within Bolivia
- Coordinates: 17°49′0″S 65°56′0″W
- Country: Bolivia
- Department: Cochabamba Department
- Province: Esteban Arce Province
- Seat: Anzaldo

Government
  - Mayor: Asterio Camacho Ugarte (2007)
  - President: Alberto García Meneces (2007)

Area
  - Total: 247 sq mi (641 km^{2})
- Elevation: 8,500 ft (2,600 m)

Population (2001)
  - Total: 9,126
- Time zone: UTC-4 (BOT)

Anzaldo Municipality is the second municipal section of the Esteban Arce Province in the Cochabamba Department, Bolivia. Its seat is Anzaldo. At the time of census 2001 the municipality had 9,126 inhabitants.

== Subdivision ==
Anzaldo Municipality is divided into three cantons.

Kanton	Inhabitants (2001)	Seat
Anzaldo Canton	7,026	Anzaldo
Quiriria Canton	1,043	Quiriria
La Viña Canton	1,057	La Viña

== Languages ==
The languages spoken in the Anzaldo Municipality are mainly Quechua and Spanish.

Language	Inhabitants
Quechua	8,495
Aymara	20
Guaraní	5
Another native	2
Spanish	2,553
Foreign	12
Only native	6,039
Native and Spanish	2,464
Only Spanish	89

== See also ==
- Jatun Mayu
- Jaya Mayu
- Misuk'ani
- Puka Qawiña
