= Jatun Mayu (Esteban Arce) =

- Etymology: Quechua

Location
- Country: Bolivia
- Region: Cochabamba Department, Esteban Arce Province

Basin features
- Tributaries
  - left: Yuraq Corral
  - right: Kekoma Mayu, Yunkha Thaqui, Pisu Qullu

Jatun Mayu (Quechua hatun, jatun big, great, mayu river, "great river") is a Bolivian river in the Cochabamba Department, Esteban Arce Province, in the Anzaldo and Sacabamba Municipalities. Its waters flow to Laguna Angostura.

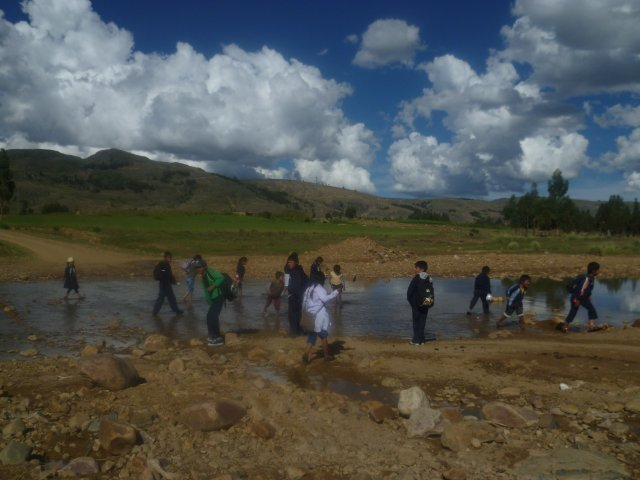
Children are crossing Sacabamba River.

Upstream the river is called Challaque. Its direction is mainly north west as it flows along Challaque, Sacabamba, Matarani and Apillapa. Before reaching the town Cliza the name of the river changes to the Siches River or Cliza River. It is the main tributary of Laguna Angostura.
