= Jaya Mayu =

- Etymology: Quechua

Location
- Country: Bolivia
- Region: Cochabamba Department, Esteban Arce Province

Jaya Mayu (Quechua jaya pungency, locoto, mayu river) is a Bolivian river in the Cochabamba Department, Esteban Arce Province, Anzaldo Municipality. The Jaya Mayu is a left tributary of Caine River.
