= Misuk'ani =

Mountain in Bolivia

- Location within Bolivia

Highest point
- Elevation: 3,256 m (10,682 ft)
- Coordinates: 17°48′15″S 65°49′16″W

Geography
- Location: Bolivia, Cochabamba Department
- Parent range: Andes

Misuk'ani (misuk'a common name of Adesmia miraflorensis, Aymara -ni a suffix, "the one with the misuk'a plant", also spelled Misucani) is a 3,256-metre-high (10,682 ft) mountain in the Bolivian Andes. It is located in the Cochabamba Department, Esteban Arce Province, Anzaldo Municipality, west of the village of Matarani.
