= Sacabamba =

Sacabamba Saqapampa
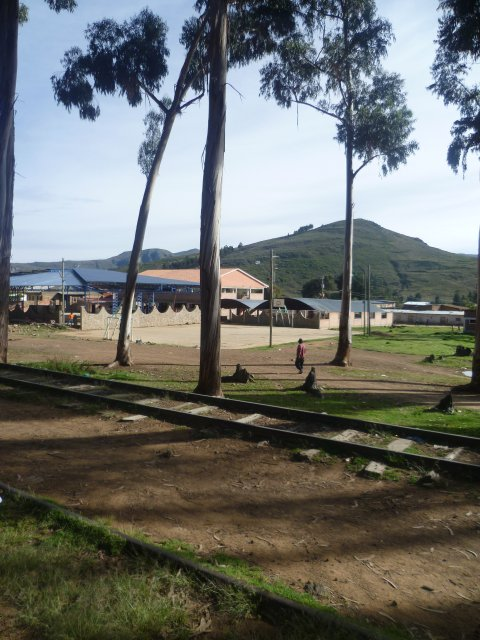

- Location of Sacabamba within Bolivia
- Coordinates: 17°48′0″S 65°45′0″W
- Country: Bolivia
- Department: Cochabamba Department
- Province: Esteban Arce Province
- Municipality: Sacabamba Municipality
- Canton: Sacabamba Canton

Population (2001)
  - Total: 636
- Time zone: UTC-4 (BOT)

Sacabamba (Quechua: Saqapampa) is a town in the Cochabamba Department in central Bolivia. It is the capital of Sacabamba Municipality, the fourth municipal section of Esteban Arce Province. At the time of census 2001 it had a population of 636.

The jawless fish Sacabambaspis, discovered in the nearby Anzaldo Formation, was named after this town, which in recent years has become a source of memes and fanarts after a viral tweet from August 2022 about a poorly reconstructed model of the creature from the Natural History Museum of Helsinki in Finland.

== See also ==
- Jatun Mayu
