= Sacabamba Municipality =

- Municipality
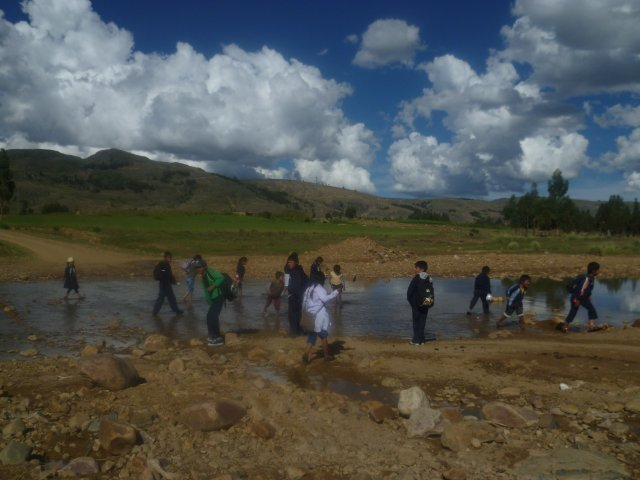
- Sacabamba River

- Location of the Sacabamba Municipality within Bolivia
- Coordinates: 17°46′0″S 65°48′0″W
- Country: Bolivia
- Department: Cochabamba Department
- Province: Esteban Arce Province
- Seat: Sacabamba

Government
  - Mayor: Alejandro Molina Ojeda (2007)
  - President: Gerardo Blanco Rioja (2007)

Area
  - Total: 184 km^{2} (71 sq mi)

Population (2001)
  - Total: 4,718
- Time zone: UTC-4 (BOT)

Sacabamba Municipality is the fourth municipal section of the Esteban Arce Province in the Cochabamba Department, Bolivia. Its seat is Sacabamba. At the time of census 2001 the municipality had 4,718 inhabitants.

== Cantons ==
Sacabamba Municipality is divided into five cantons.

Canton	Inhabitants (2001)	Seat
Sacabamba Canton	1,749	Sacabamba
Apillapa Canton	390	Apillapa
Challaque Canton	403	Challaque
Matarani Canton	1,004	Matarani
Quekoma Canton	1,172	Quekoma

== See also ==
- Atuq Wachana
- Jatun Mayu
- Jatun Urqu
- Jatun Urqu (Matarani)
- Pukara
