= Atuq Wachana (Arce-Punata) =

Mountain in Bolivia

- Location within Bolivia

Highest point
- Elevation: 3,862 m (12,671 ft)
- Coordinates: 17°43′49″S 65°45′23″W

Geography
- Location: Bolivia, Cochabamba Department
- Parent range: Andes

Atuq Wachana (Quechua atuq fox, wacha birth, to give birth, -na a suffix, 'where the fox is born', also spelled Atoj Huachana) is a 3,862-metre-high (12,671 ft) mountain in the Bolivian Andes. It is located in the Cochabamba Department, Esteban Arce Province, Sacabamba Municipality, and in the Punata Province, Cuchumuela Municipality. Atuq Wachana lies between Wila Jaqhi in the northeast and Pukara in the southwest.
