= Arbieto Municipality =

- Municipality
- Location of the Arbieto Municipality within Bolivia
- Coordinates: 17°33′0″S 66°5′0″W
- Country: Bolivia
- Department: Cochabamba Department
- Province: Esteban Arce Province
- Seat: Arbieto

Government
  - Mayor: Crecencio Soto Amurrio (2007)
  - President: Fernando Fernández Claros (2007

Area
  - Total: 56 sq mi (146 km^{2})

Population (2001)
  - Total: 9,438
- Time zone: UTC-4 (BOT)

Arbieto Municipality is the third municipal section of the Esteban Arce Province in the Cochabamba Department, Bolivia. Its seat is Arbieto. At the time of census 2001 the municipality had 9,438 inhabitants.

== Subdivision ==
Arbieto Municipality is divided into three cantons.

Kanton	Inhabitants (2001)	Seat
Arbieto Canton	4,156	Arbieto
Aranjuez Canton	1,284	Aranjuez
Arpita Canton	3,998	Arpita
