= Anzaldo =

- Location of Anzaldo within Bolivia
- Coordinates: 17°50′0″S 65°55′0″W
- Country: Bolivia
- Department: Cochabamba Department
- Province: Esteban Arce Province
- Municipality: Anzaldo Municipality
- Canton: Anzaldo Canton

Population (2001)
  - Total: 1,178
- Time zone: UTC-4 (BOT)

Anzaldo is a location in the Cochabamba Department in central Bolivia. It is the seat of the Anzaldo Municipality, the second municipal section of the Esteban Arce Province.

The municipality's population is 9,126 residents according to the 2012 Census.

== Climate ==
Climate data for Anzaldo, elevation 3,032 m (9,948 ft), (1976–2008)
Month	Jan	Feb	Mar	Apr	May	Jun	Jul	Aug	Sep	Oct	Nov	Dec	Year
Mean daily maximum °C (°F)	20.4 (68.7)	20.3 (68.5)	20.6 (69.1)	21.0 (69.8)	20.8 (69.4)	19.9 (67.8)	19.4 (66.9)	20.8 (69.4)	21.8 (71.2)	22.7 (72.9)	22.8 (73.0)	22.1 (71.8)	21.1 (69.9)
Daily mean °C (°F)	14.2 (57.6)	14.1 (57.4)	14.2 (57.6)	13.5 (56.3)	11.9 (53.4)	10.4 (50.7)	10.0 (50.0)	11.4 (52.5)	13.3 (55.9)	14.6 (58.3)	15.2 (59.4)	15.0 (59.0)	13.2 (55.7)
Mean daily minimum °C (°F)	8.1 (46.6)	7.9 (46.2)	7.8 (46.0)	5.9 (42.6)	3.0 (37.4)	1.0 (33.8)	0.7 (33.3)	2.2 (36.0)	4.9 (40.8)	6.4 (43.5)	7.6 (45.7)	8.0 (46.4)	5.3 (41.5)
Average precipitation mm (inches)	140.8 (5.54)	88.7 (3.49)	90.4 (3.56)	26.0 (1.02)	2.7 (0.11)	3.4 (0.13)	1.2 (0.05)	4.6 (0.18)	13.4 (0.53)	24.4 (0.96)	55.0 (2.17)	100.3 (3.95)	550.9 (21.69)
Average precipitation days (≥ 1.0 mm)	12.2	8.8	8.4	2.4	0.5	0.4	0.2	0.7	2.3	3.1	5.8	8.5	53.3
Source: Servicio Nacional de Meteorología e Hidrología de Bolivia
