= Tarata Municipality =

- Municipality
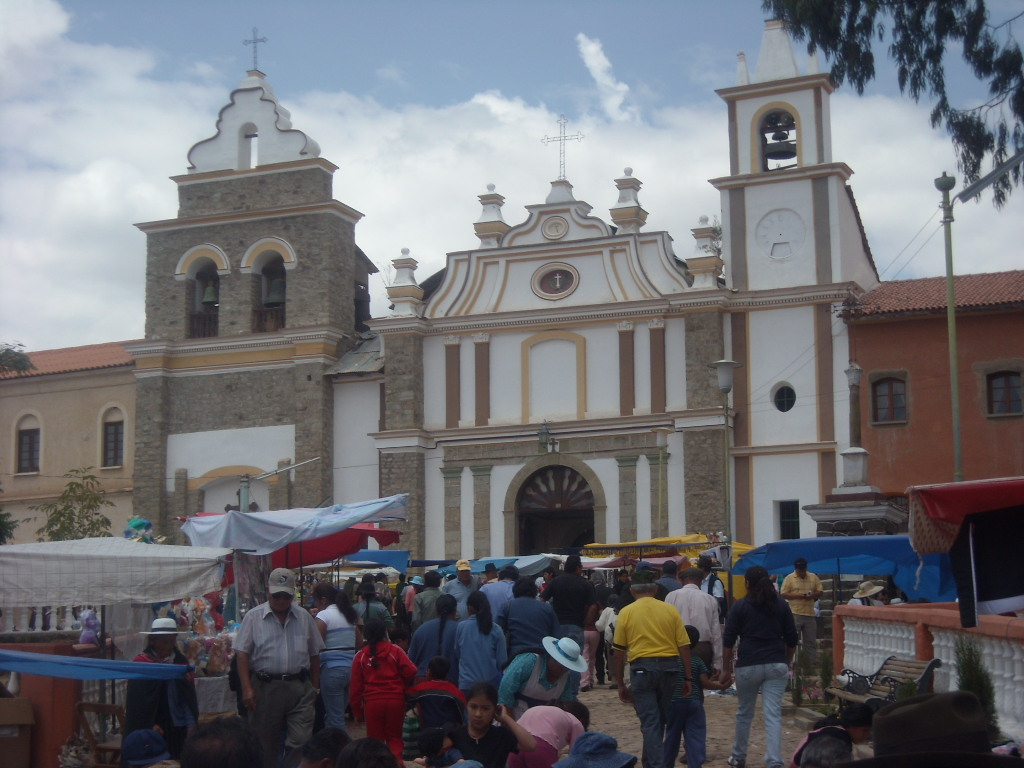
- San José church in Tarata

- Location of the Tarata Municipality within Bolivia
- Coordinates: 17°41′0″S 66°3′0″W
- Country: Bolivia
- Department: Cochabamba Department
- Province: Esteban Arce Province
- Seat: Tarata

Government
  - Mayor: Pedro Hipolito Corrales (2008)
  - President: Benjamin Zurita Meneses (2008)

Area
  - Total: 129 sq mi (335 km^{2})
- Elevation: 8,500 ft (2,600 m)

Population (2001)
  - Total: 8,715
  - Density: 68/sq mi (26.1/km^{2})
- Time zone: UTC-4 (BOT)

Tarata Municipality (Quechua: T'arata munisipyu) is the first municipal section of the Esteban Arce Province in the Cochabamba Department, Bolivia. Its capital is Tarata. At the time of census 2001 the municipality had 8,715 inhabitants. Along with neighboring municipalities such as Arbieto, Cliza, Tolata, and Punata, much of its population lives abroad, mainly in Argentina, Spain, Italy, and the Washington DC area in the United States.

== Subdivision ==
Tarata Municipality is divided into four cantons.

Kanton	Inhabitants (2001)	Seat
Tarata Canton	5,983	Tarata
Huasa Rancho Canton	822	Huasa Rancho
Huayculi Canton	1,134	Huayculi
Izata Canton	776	Izata

== Languages ==
The languages spoken in the Tarata Municipality are mainly Quechua and Spanish.

Language	Inhabitants
Quechua	7,321
Aymara	78
Guaraní	8
Another native	2
Spanish	5,491
Foreign	43
Only native	2,734
Native and Spanish	4,621
Only Spanish	871
