= Jatun Urqu (Bolivia) =

Mountain in Bolivia

- Location within Bolivia

Highest point
- Elevation: 3,600 m (11,800 ft)
- Coordinates: 17°47′57″S 65°43′28″W

Geography
- Location: Bolivia, Cochabamba Department
- Parent range: Andes

Jatun Urqu (Quechua jatun big, urqu mountain, "big mountain", also spelled Jatun Orkho) is a mountain in the Bolivian Andes which reaches a height of approximately 3,600 m (11,800 ft). It is located in the Cochabamba Department, Esteban Arce Province, Sacabamba Municipality, northeast of Sacabamba. It lies southwest of Inka Pirqa and Tunari.
