= Arbieto =

- Location of Arbieto within Bolivia
- Coordinates: 17°34′0″S 66°01′0″W
- Country: Bolivia
- Department: Cochabamba Department
- Province: Esteban Arce Province
- Municipality: Arbieto Municipality
- Canton: Arbieto Canton

Population (2001)
  - Total: 1,347
- Time zone: UTC-4 (BOT)

Arbieto is a location in the Cochabamba Department in central Bolivia. It is the seat of Arbieto Municipality, the third municipal section of Esteban Arce Province. At the time of census 2001 it had a population of 1,347.

== See also ==
- Ignacio de Arbieto
