= La Angostura Lake =

Lake in Bolivia

Laguna La Angostura
- Location within Cochabamba Location within Bolivia Location within South America
- Interactive map of Laguna La Angostura
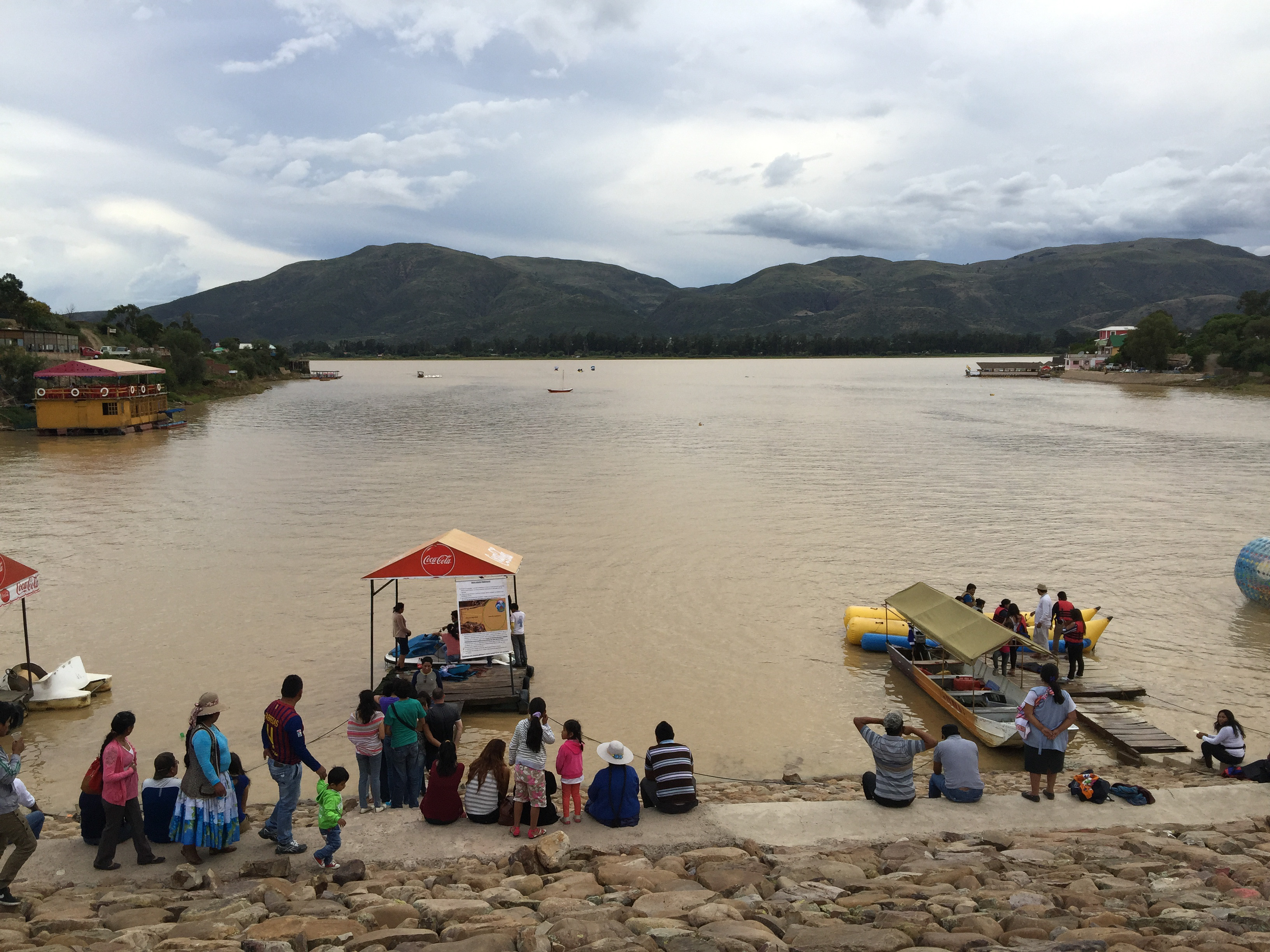
- Angustora Lake
- Location: Cochabamba Department
- Coordinates: 17°33′S 66°04′W
- Basin countries: Bolivia
- Surface area: 10.5 km^{2} (4.1 sq mi)
- Surface elevation: 2,700 m (8,900 ft)

Laguna La Angostura is a lake in the Cochabamba Department, Bolivia. At an elevation of 2700 m, its surface area is 10.5 km².

The lake was formed by the completion of the La Angostura Dam in the 1940s.
