= Jatun Urqu (Matarani) =

Mountain in Bolivia

- Location within Bolivia

Highest point
- Elevation: 3,552 m (11,654 ft)
- Coordinates: 17°46′09″S 65°46′48″W

Geography
- Location: Bolivia, Cochabamba Department
- Parent range: Andes

Jatun Urqu (Quechua jatun big, urqu mountain, "big mountain," also spelled Jatun Orkho) is a 3,552-metre-high (11,654 ft) mountain in the Bolivian Andes. It is in the Cochabamba Department, Esteban Arce Province, Sacabamba Municipality, northeast of the village of Matarani.
