= Esteban Arze Province =

Province in Bolivia

Coordinates: 17°50′S 66°20′W

Provincia Esteban Arze T'arata (Quechua)
- Province
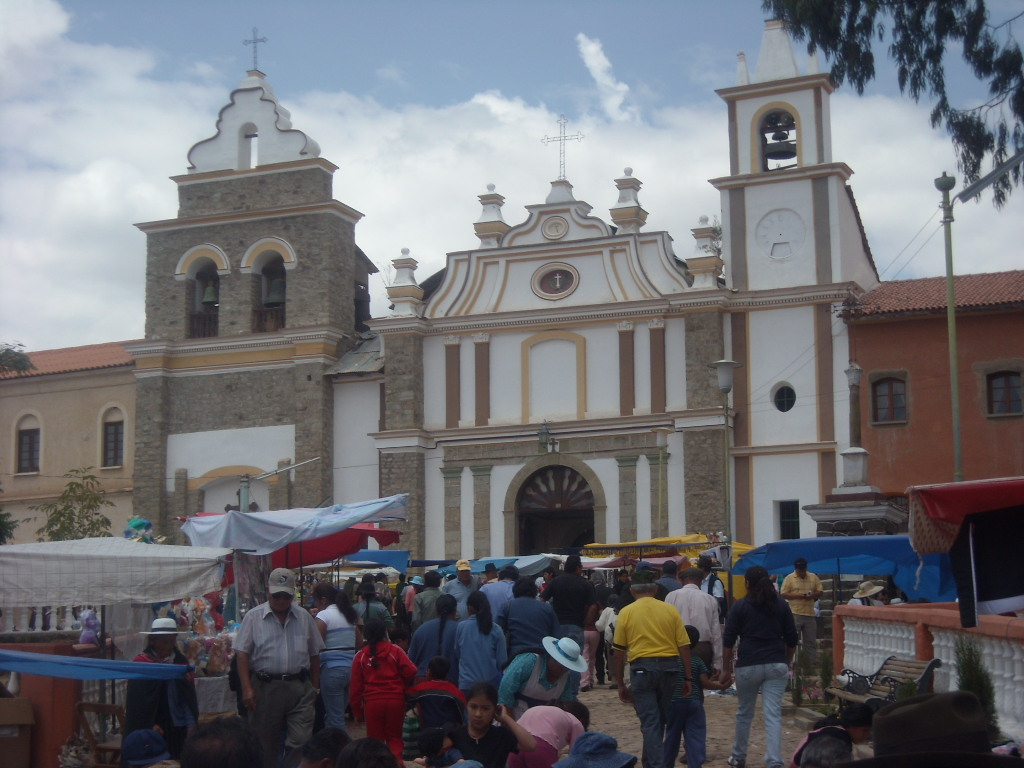
- San José church in Esteban Arze square (Moko Pata), Tarata
- Interactive map of Provincia Esteban Arze
- Country: Bolivia
- Department: Cochamba

Area
  - Total: 1,245 km^{2} (481 sq mi)
- Elevation: 2,750 m (9,020 ft)

Population (2024)
  - Total: 53,964
  - Density: 43.34/km^{2} (112.3/sq mi)
- ISO 3166 code: BO.CB.EA

Esteban Arze (Quechua: T'arata) is a province in Cochabamba Department, Bolivia. Its capital is Tarata.

Many people from the Esteban Arze province (Tarata and Arbieto) have migrated abroad, mainly to Argentina and to the Washington DC area (Arlington county, Fairfax county, and Alexandria Virginia, and Montgomery County Maryland).

== People ==
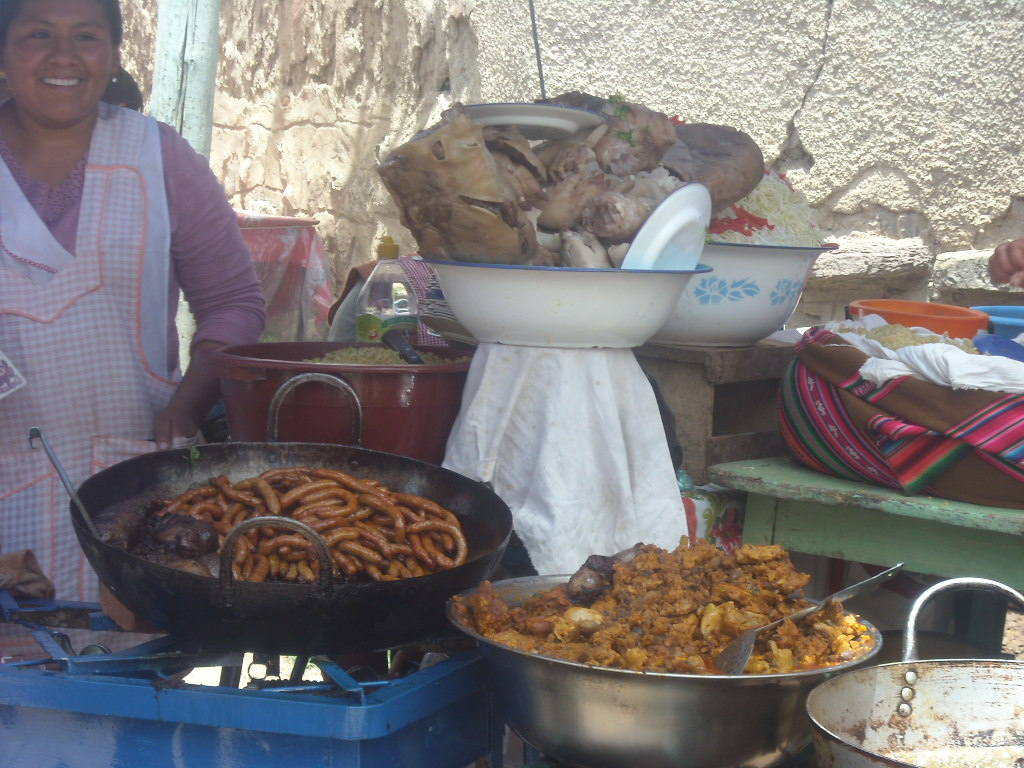
Traditional sausages (chorizos) from Tarata

Languages spoken in the province are Quechua and Spanish. The province's primary feast is in honor of Saint Severin, which is celebrated the last Sunday of November in the town of Tarata.

== Location ==
Esteban Arze boasts the lake Laguna La Angostura; rivers Jatun Mayu and Jaya Mayu; and mountains Atuq Wachana, Jatun Urqu, Jatun Urqu (Matarani), Misuk'ani, Puka Qawiña, and Pukara.

== Subdivision ==
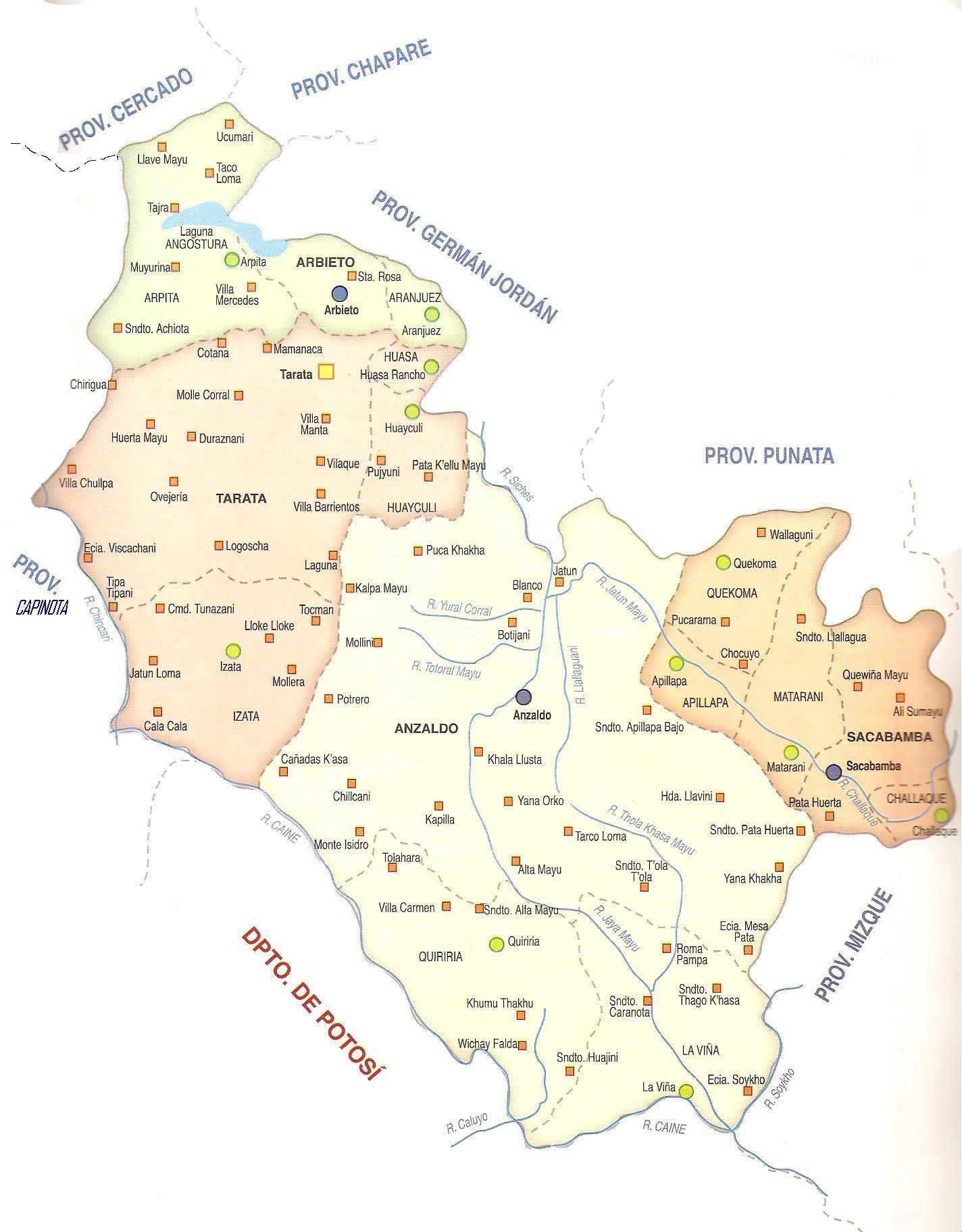
Political map of Esteban Arze Province

The province is divided into four municipalities which are further subdivided into fifteen cantons. The municipalities with their seats are:

| Section | Municipality | Seat |
|---|---|---|
| 1st | Tarata Municipality | Tarata |
| 2nd | Anzaldo Municipality | Anzaldo |
| 3rd | Arbieto Municipality | Arbieto |
| 4th | Sacabamba Municipality | Sacabamba |
