= Ch'uxñani =

Mountain in Bolivia

- Location within Bolivia

Highest point
- Elevation: 4,680 m (15,350 ft)
- Coordinates: 15°45′52″S 68°30′06″W

Geography
- Location: Bolivia, La Paz Department
- Parent range: Andes

Ch'uxñani (Aymara Ch'uxña green, Spanish -ni a suffix to indicate ownership, "the one with green color" or "the green one", also spelled Chojñani, Chojnani) is a 4,680-metre-high (15,354 ft) mountain in the Andes of Bolivia. It is located in the La Paz Department, Larecaja Province, Sorata Municipality, in the northern extensions of the Cordillera Real southeast of the mountain Jach'a Waylla Punta. Ch'uxñani lies near the confluence of the rivers Ch'uch'u Jawira which comes from the northwest and Jach'a Uma Jawira which originates between the mountain Wila Quta and the Janq'u Uma-Illampu massif.
