= Calzada (mountain) =

Mountain in Bolivia

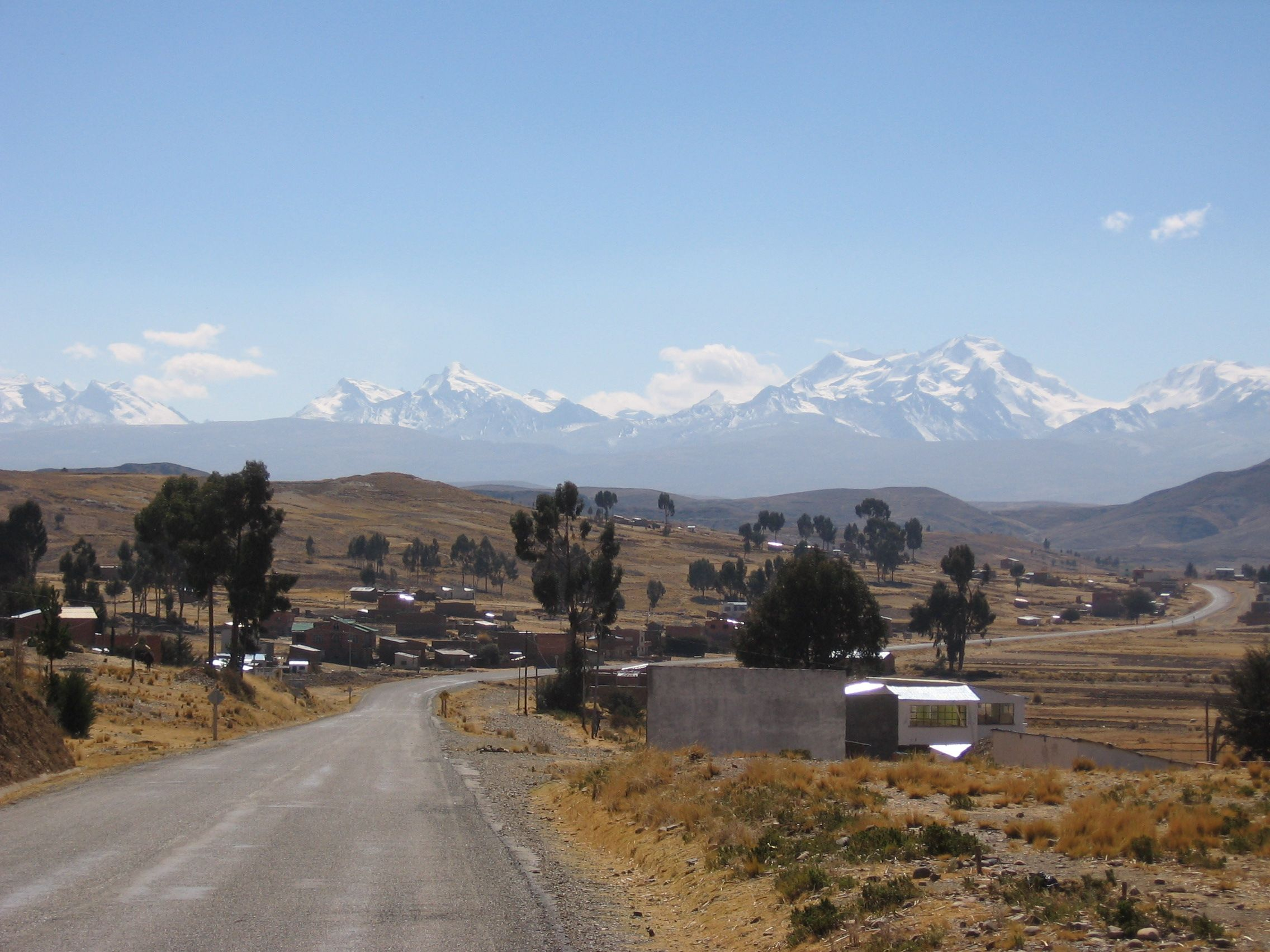
- Casiri, Calzada and Chearoco as seen from Chua Cocani (near Lake Titicaca)

Highest point
- Elevation: 5,874 m (19,272 ft)
- Coordinates: 15°55′57″S 68°26′16″W

Geography
- Location within Bolivia
- Location: Bolivia; La Paz Department, Larecaja Province, Sorata Municipality
- Parent range: Andes, Cordillera Real

Climbing
- First ascent: 1-1962 via N.W. face,

Calzada (possibly from Aymara qalsa, stones; or Spanish calzada, road) is a mountain in the Andes, about 5,874 m (19,272 ft) high, located in the Cordillera Real of Bolivia. It lies in the La Paz Department, Larecaja Province, on the border of the Sorata Municipality and the Guanay Municipality. It is situated south-east of Ancohuma, between the mountain Q'asiri in the north-west and Chearoco in the south-east, and east of San Francisco Lake.

== See also ==
- Chachacomani
- Illampu
- List of mountains in the Andes
