= Qala Phusa (Larecaja) =

Mountain in Bolivia

- Location within Bolivia

Highest point
- Elevation: 4,884 m (16,024 ft)
- Coordinates: 15°45′43″S 68°33′44″W

Geography
- Location: Bolivia, La Paz Department, Larecaja Province
- Parent range: Andes

Qala Phusa (Aymara qala stone, phusa siku, "stone siku", also spelled Calapusa) is a 4,884-metre-high (16,024 ft) mountain in the Andes of Bolivia. It is situated in the La Paz Department, Larecaja Province, Sorata Municipality. Qala Phusa lies north of the Janq'u Uma-Illampu massif of the Cordillera Real, northwest of the mountain Wila Quta and southeast of Llawi Imaña.
