= Q'asiri (Larecaja) =

Mountain in Bolivia

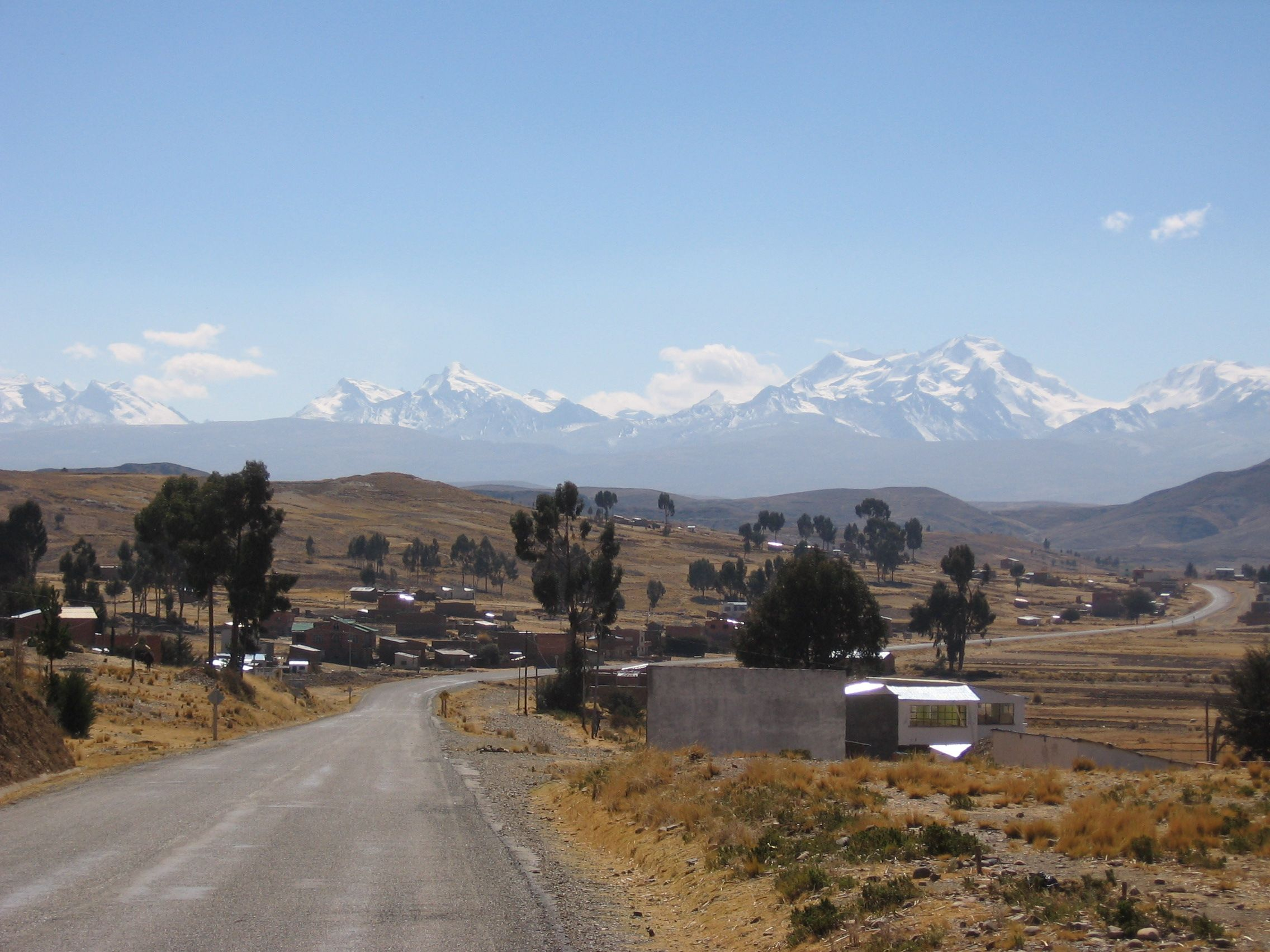
- Q'asiri, Qalsata and Ch'iyar Juqhu as seen from Chuwa (near Lake Titicaca)

Highest point
- Elevation: 5,828 m (19,121 ft)
- Coordinates: 15°53′46″S 68°28′45″W

Geography
- Location within Bolivia
- Location: Bolivia; La Paz Department, Larecaja Province, Sorata Municipality
- Parent range: Andes, Cordillera Real

Climbing
- First ascent: 1-1928: S.W. ridge-1990

Q'asiri (Aymara for bawler, Hispanicized spellings Casiri, Kasiri) is a mountain in the Cordillera Real in the Andes of Bolivia, about 5,828 m (19,121 ft) high. It is located in the La Paz Department, Larecaja Province, Sorata Municipality. It is situated south-east of the mountain Janq'u Uma, north-west of the mountains Qalsata and Ch'iyar Juqhu and north-east of San Francisco Lake.

The rivers Jisk'a Q'asiri ("little Q'asiri", Jiska Khasiri) and Jach'a Q'asiri ("big Q'asiri", Jacha Khasiri) originate on the west side of the mountain. They flow to San Francisco Lake.

== See also ==
- Illampu
- List of mountains in the Andes
