= Warus Quta (Larecaja) =

Lake in Bolivia

- Location within Bolivia
- Interactive map of Warus Quta
- Location: Bolivia, La Paz Department, Larecaja Province
- Coordinates: 15°51′02″S 68°26′06″W

Warus Quta (Aymara warusa grey-brown, quta lake, "grey-brown lake", also spelled Barros Kota) is a lake in the Cordillera Real in the Andes of Bolivia. It is situated in the La Paz Department, Larecaja Province, Sorata Municipality. Warus Quta lies south-east of the mountains Wiluyu Janq'u Uma and Yapuchañani and north-east of Uma Jalanta.
