= Jukumarini (Larecaja) =

Mountain in Bolivia

- Location within Bolivia

Highest point
- Elevation: 4,552 m (14,934 ft)
- Coordinates: 15°43′33″S 68°36′39″W

Geography
- Location: Bolivia, La Paz Department
- Parent range: Andes

Jukumarini (Aymara jukumari bear, -ni a suffix to indicate ownership, "the one with a bear", also spelled Jucumarini) is a 4,552-metre-high (14,934 ft) mountain in the Andes of Bolivia. It is situated in the La Paz Department, Larecaja Province, Sorata Municipality. Jukumarini lies north of the main range of the Cordillera Real, southwest of the mountain Ch'uch'u and west of Ch'uch'u Apachita.

== See also ==
- Chunta Qullu
