= Jach'a Pukara =

Mountain in Bolivia

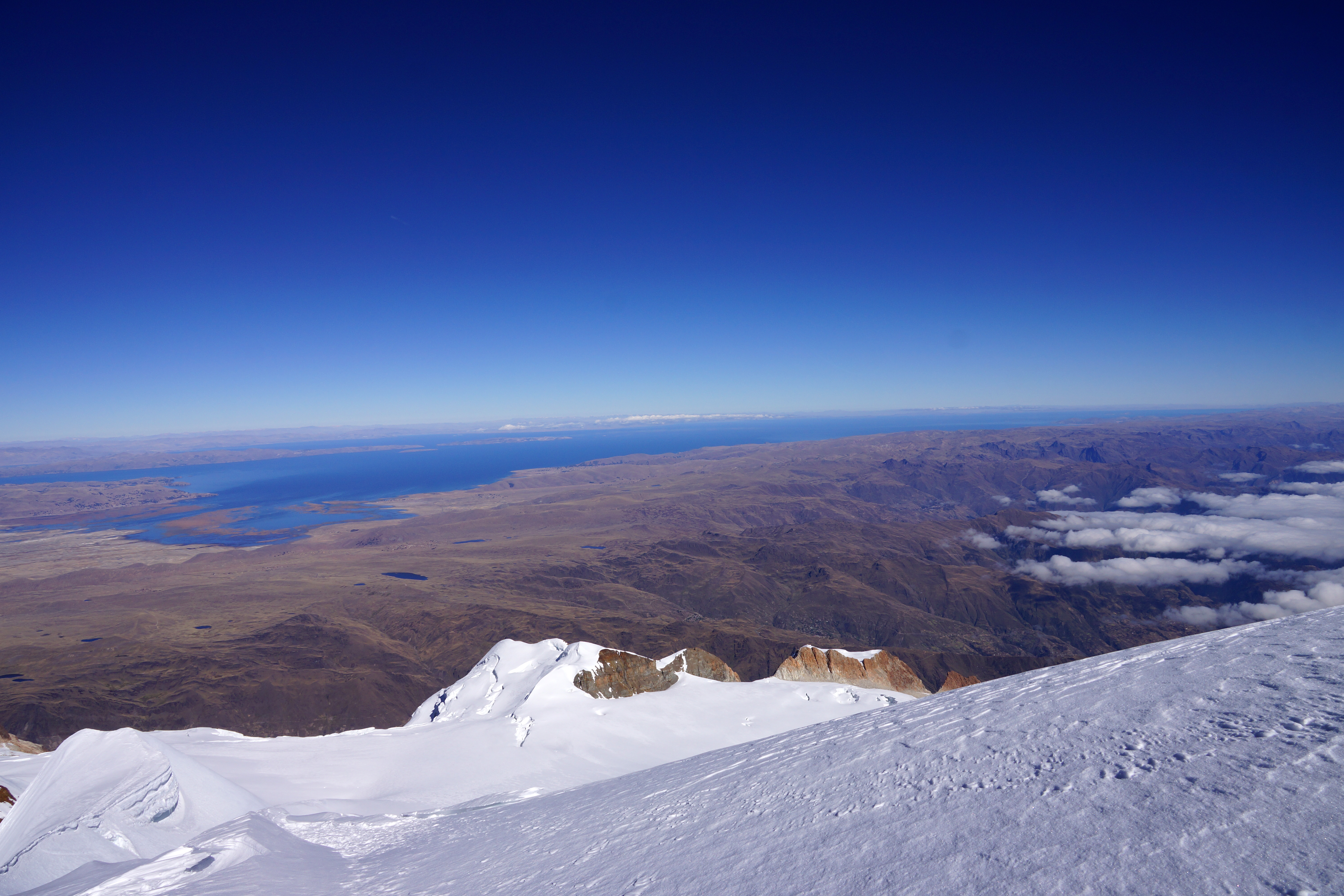
- Lake Titicaca as seen from the summit of Janq'u Uma. Jach'a Pukara is visible in the lower center of this image.

Highest point
- Elevation: 4,300 m (14,100 ft)
- Coordinates: 15°51′12″S 68°40′54″W

Geography
- Location within Bolivia
- Location: Bolivia, La Paz Department, Larecaja Province
- Parent range: Andes

Jach'a Pukara (Aymara jach'a big, pukara fortress, "big fortress", Hispanicized spelling Jachcha Pucara) is a mountain in the Andes of Bolivia, about 4,300 metres (14,108 ft) high. It is situated in the La Paz Department, Larecaja Province, Sorata Municipality. Jach'a Pukara lies between Lake Titicaca in the west and the Janq'u Uma-Illampu massif of the Cordillera Real in the east.
