= P'iq'iñ Qullu =

Mountain in Bolivia

- Location within Bolivia

Highest point
- Elevation: 4,875 m (15,994 ft)
- Coordinates: 15°48′48″S 68°35′39″W

Geography
- Location: Bolivia, La Paz Department, Larecaja Province
- Parent range: Andes, Cordillera Real

P'iq'iñ Qullu (Aymara p'iq'iña head, qullu mountain, "head mountain", also spelled Peken Kkollu) is a mountain in the north of the Cordillera Real in the Andes of Bolivia, about 4,875-metre (15,994 ft) high. It is situated in the La Paz Department, Larecaja Province, Sorata Municipality. P'iq'iñ Qullu lies west of the Janq'u Uma-Illampu massif southeast of Sorata.
