= Ch'iyar Qullu (Larecaja) =

Mountain in Bolivia

- Location within Bolivia

Highest point
- Elevation: 4,875 m (15,994 ft)
- Coordinates: 15°51′30″S 68°34′55″W

Geography
- Location: Bolivia, La Paz Department, Larecaja Province
- Parent range: Andes, Cordillera Real

Ch'iyar Qullu (Aymara ch'iyara black, qullu mountain, "black mountain", also spelled Chiar Kkollu) is a 4,875-metre-high (15,994 ft) mountain in the north of the Cordillera Real in the Andes of Bolivia. It is situated in the La Paz Department, Larecaja Province, Sorata Municipality. Ch'iyar Qullu lies west of the Janq'u Uma-Illampu massif and north-east of the mountain Achachi Qullu (Achachi Kkollu).
