= Ch'uxña Quta (Larecaja) =

Mountain in Bolivia

- Location within Bolivia

Highest point
- Elevation: 4,907 m (16,099 ft)
- Coordinates: 15°44′33″S 68°34′50″W

Geography
- Location: Bolivia, La Paz Department, Larecaja Province
- Parent range: Andes

Ch'uxña Quta (Aymara ch'uxña green, quta lake, "green lake", also spelled Chojña Kkota) is a 4,907-metre-high (16,099 ft) mountain in the Andes of Bolivia. It is situated in the La Paz Department, Larecaja Province, Sorata Municipality. Ch'uxña Quta lies in the northern extensions of the Cordillera Real southeast of the mountains Ch'uch'u and Ch'uch'u Apachita and northwest of Llawi Imaña.
