= Jach'a Apachita (La Paz) =

Mountain in Bolivia

- Location within Bolivia

Highest point
- Elevation: 4,420 m (14,500 ft)
- Coordinates: 15°45′11″S 68°27′31″W

Geography
- Location: Bolivia, La Paz Department, Larecaja Province
- Parent range: Andes

Jach'a Apachita (Aymara jach'a big, apachita the place of transit of an important pass in the principal routes of the Andes; name in the Andes for a stone cairn, a little pile of rocks built along the trail in the high mountains, also spelled Jacha Apacheta) is a mountain in the Andes of Bolivia, about 4,420 metres (14,501 ft) high. It is situated in the La Paz Department, Larecaja Province, Sorata Municipality. Jach'a Apachita lies northeast of the Janq'u Uma-Illampu massif of the Cordillera Real.
