= Quña Quñani =

Mountain in Bolivia

- Location within Bolivia

Highest point
- Elevation: 5,006 m (16,424 ft)
- Coordinates: 15°54′15″S 68°34′04″W

Geography
- Location: Bolivia, La Paz Department, Larecaja Province
- Parent range: Andes, Cordillera Real

Quña Quñani (Aymara quña wool of a lamb, quña quña hair of the body, -ni a suffix to indicate ownership, also spelled Kuna Kunani, Kuña Kuñani) is a 5,006-metre-high (16,424 ft) mountain in the north of the Cordillera Real in the Andes of Bolivia. It is located in the La Paz Department, Larecaja Province, Sorata Municipality. Quña Quñani lies south of the Janq'u Uma-Illampu massif between the lakes Laram Quta ("blue lake", Laram Kkota) in the northwest and Warawarani (Huara Huarani) and Jisk'a Warawarani (Jiskha Huara Huarani) in the east and southeast. It is situated north and northwest of the mountains Salluyu (Salluyo) and Janq'u K'ark'a.
