= Sorata (disambiguation) =

Sorata can refer to:

== Places ==
- Sorata, Bolivia
- Sorata Municipality, Bolivia

== Fictional characters ==
- Sorata Muon, from Mouse
- Sorata Arisugawa, from X
- Sorata Kanda, from ‘’The Pet Girl of Sakurasou’’

== Biology ==
- Sorata, a genus of spiders
