= Yapuchañani =

Mountain in Bolivia

- Location within Bolivia

Highest point
- Elevation: 5,526 m (18,130 ft)
- Coordinates: 15°50′29″S 68°27′36″W

Geography
- Location: Bolivia, La Paz Department, Larecaja Province, Sorata Municipality
- Parent range: Andes, Cordillera Real

Climbing
- First ascent: 1966

Yapuchañani (Aymara yapuchaña to cultivate land, -ni a suffix to indicate ownership, "the one with cultivated land", also spelled Yapuchanani) is a mountain in the Cordillera Real in the Andes of Bolivia, about 5,526 metres (18,130 ft) high. It is located in the La Paz Department, Larecaja Province, Sorata Municipality. It lies northeast of Misk'i T'ant'a and Uma Jalanta, east of Janq'u Uma and Janq'u Piti and southeast of Wiluyu Janq'u Uma (or Wiluyu).
