= Warachani (Bolivia) =

Mountain in Bolivia

- Location within Bolivia

Highest point
- Elevation: 4,540 m (14,900 ft)
- Coordinates: 15°44′45″S 68°35′45″W

Geography
- Location: Bolivia, La Paz Department, Larecaja Province
- Parent range: Andes

Warachani (Aymara waracha wooden camp bed,-ni a suffix, "the one with the wooden campbed", also spelled Huarachani) is a mountain in the northern extensions of the Cordillera Real in the Andes of Bolivia which reaches a height of approximately 4,540 m (14,900 ft). It is located in the La Paz Department, Larecaja Province, Sorata Municipality. It lies southwest of Chunta Qullu. The Ch'alla Suyu River ("sand region", Challa Suyu) originates at the mountain. It flows to the southwest.
