= Jichu Quta =

Mountain in Bolivia

- Location within Bolivia

Highest point
- Elevation: 4,560 m (14,960 ft)
- Coordinates: 15°36′39″S 68°35′18″W

Geography
- Location: Bolivia, La Paz Department, Larecaja Province, Sorata Municipality
- Parent range: Andes

Jichu Quta (Aymara jichu ichhu (Peruvian feather grass), quta lake, "ichhu lake", also spelled Jicho Kkota) is a mountain north of the Cordillera Real in the Andes of Bolivia which reaches a height of approximately 4,560 m (14,960 ft). It is located in the La Paz Department, Larecaja Province, Sorata Municipality, at the border with the Quiabaya Municipality. Jichu Quta lies south of Saywani at a lake named Quriwari. The Wayllani Jawira originates near the mountain. It flows to the west.
