= Chunta Qullu (Bolivia) =

Mountain in Bolivia

- Location within Bolivia

Highest point
- Elevation: 4,800 m (15,700 ft)
- Coordinates: 15°44′24″S 68°35′05″W

Geography
- Location: Bolivia, La Paz Department, Larecaja Province
- Parent range: Andes

Chunta Qullu (Aymara chunta prolonged, lengthened, qullu mountain, "prolonged mountain", also spelled Chunta Kkollu) is a mountain in the Andes of Bolivia, about 4,800-metre (15,748 ft) high. It is situated in the La Paz Department, Larecaja Province, Sorata Municipality, north of the Cordillera Real. Chunta Chullu lies southeast of the mountain Ch'uch'u and northwest of the mountain Llawi Imaña.

== See also ==
- Ch'uch'u Jawira
- Wila Wilani
