= Ch'usiq Uta =

Cave in Larecaja, La Paz, Bolivia

Ch'usiq Uta (Aymara ch'usiqa owl, uta house, "owl house", also spelled Ch'usek Uta), also known as Cueva de San Pedro or Gruta de San Pedro (Spanish for "cave of Saint Peter" or "grotto of Saint Peter"), is a cave with an enclosed lake in the La Paz Department in Bolivia. It is situated in the Larecaja Province, Sorata Municipality, about 16 kilometres (10 mi) from Sorata. Ch'usiq Uta is considered the largest and most famous cave of the department. It is a refuge for Geoffroy's tailless bat.
