= Allqamarini (disambiguation) =

Allqamarini (Aymara allqamari mountain caracara, -ni a suffix, "the one with the mountain caracara", also spelled Alcamarine, Alcamarini, Alccamarine, Alccamarini, Alkamarini, Allcamarine, Allkamarini, Allkhamarini, also Alqamarini) may refer to:

- Allqamarini, a mountain in the Franz Tamayo Province, La Paz Department, Bolivia
- Allqamarini (Larecaja), a mountain in the Larecaja Province, La Paz Department, Bolivia
- Allqamarini (Peru), a mountain in the Puno Region, Peru
