= Achachi Qala (Quiabaya) =

Mountain in Bolivia

- Location within Bolivia

Highest point
- Elevation: 4,760 m (15,620 ft)
- Coordinates: 15°39′41″S 68°34′44″W

Geography
- Location: Bolivia, La Paz Department, Larecaja Province
- Parent range: Andes

Achachi Qala (Aymara for "gigantic stone", also spelled Achachicala) is a mountain north of the Cordillera Real in the Andes of Bolivia which reaches a height of approximately 4,760 m (15,620 ft). It is located in the La Paz Department, Larecaja Province, Quiabaya Municipality. Achachi Qala lies southwest of Saywani, northeast of Quriwani and east of Mitalani.
