= Jach'a Waylla Punta =

Mountain in Bolivia

- Location within Bolivia

Highest point
- Elevation: 4,743 m (15,561 ft)
- Coordinates: 15°43′54″S 68°30′50″W

Geography
- Location: Bolivia, La Paz Department
- Parent range: Andes

Jach'a Waylla Punta (Aymara jach'a big, waylla Stipa obtusa, a kind of feather grass, Spanish punta point, also spelled Jacha Huaylla Punta or Jacha Huayna Punta) is a 4,743-metre-high (15,561 ft) mountain in the Andes of Bolivia. It is located in the La Paz Department, Larecaja Province, Sorata Municipality. Jach'a Waylla Punta lies in the northern extensions of the Cordillera Real southeast of the mountain Wila Wilani and south of Wankar Quta Qullu. It is situated at the rivers Q'asiri Jawira and Ch'uch'u Jawira.
