= Janq'u Quta (Larecaja) =

Lake in Bolivia

- Location within Bolivia Location within South America
- Interactive map of Janq'u Quta
- Location: Bolivia, La Paz Department, Larecaja Province, Guanay Municipality
- Coordinates: 15°57′40″S 68°26′33″W

Janq'u Quta (Aymara janq'u white, quta lake, "white lake", hispanicized spelling Janko Kota) is a lake in the Cordillera Real in the Andes of Bolivia. It is located in the La Paz Department, Larecaja Province, in the south-west of the Guanay Municipality. Janq'u Quta lies near the mountain Ch'iyar Juqhu. Lake can be reached from village Chajolpaya, Municipio Sorata, Provincia Larecaja, La Paz, Bolivia.

== See also ==
- Kuntur Jipiña
