= Ch'uxña Quta =

Ch'uxña Quta or Ch'uxñaquta (Aymara ch'uxña green, quta lake, "green lake", other spellings Chocñacota, Chocñaccota, Chojña Khota, Choiña Kkota, Chojna Kkota, Chojña Kkota, Chojña Kota, Chojñakhota, Chojñakota) may refer to:

== Lakes ==
- Ch'uxña Quta (Charasani), in the Charazani Municipality, Bautista Saavedra Province, La Paz Department, Bolivia
- Ch'uxña Quta (Curva), in the Curva Municipality, Bautista Saavedra Province, La Paz Department, Bolivia
- Ch'uxña Quta (Murillo), in the Murillo Province, La Paz Department, Bolivia
- Ch'uxñaquta (Carabaya), in the Carabaya Province, Puno Region, Peru

== Mountains ==
- Ch'uxña Quta (Larecaja), in the Larecaja Province, La Paz Department, Bolivia
- Ch'uxña Quta (Pacajes), in the Pacajes Province, La Paz Department, Bolivia
- Ch'uxña Quta (Loayza), in the Loayza Province, La Paz Department, Bolivia
- Ch'uxñaquta (Putina), a mountain at a lake of that name in the Putina Province, Puno Region, Peru
