= Wankar Quta Qullu =

Mountain in Bolivia

- Location within Bolivia

Highest point
- Elevation: 4,900 m (16,100 ft)
- Coordinates: 15°42′18″S 68°31′33″W

Geography
- Location: Bolivia, La Paz Department, Larecaja Province
- Parent range: Andes

Wankar Quta Qullu (Aymara wankara a kind of drum, quta lake, qullu mountain, "wankara lake mountain", also spelled Huancar Kkota Kkollu) is a mountain in the Andes of Bolivia, about 4,900 metres (16,076 ft) high. It is situated in the La Paz Department, Larecaja Province, Sorata Municipality, north of the main range of the Cordillera Real. Wankar Quta Qullu lies northeast of the mountain Wila Wilani. South of it there is a lake named Q'asiri Quta. A little river named Q'asiri Jawira originates here. It flows to Ch'uch'u Jawira in the south.
