= Wiluyu Janq'u Uma =

Mountain in Bolivia

- Wiluyu
- Location within Bolivia

Highest point
- Elevation: 5,540 m (18,180 ft)
- Coordinates: 15°49′52″S 68°28′12″W

Geography
- Location: Bolivia, La Paz Department, Larecaja Province, Sorata Municipality
- Parent range: Andes, Cordillera Real

Climbing
- First ascent: 1928

Wiluyu Janq'u Uma or Wiluyu (Aymara wila red, uyu corral, yard, janq'u white uma water, "red corral white water" or "red corral", also spelled Viluyo Jankhouma, Viluyo) is a mountain in the Cordillera Real in the Andes of Bolivia, about 5,540 metres (18,176 ft) high. It is located in the La Paz Department, Larecaja Province, Sorata Municipality. It lies northwest of the mountain Yapuchañani, northeast of Misk'i T'ant'a and Uma Jalanta and east of Illampu.
