= Ch'uch'u Apachita =

Mountain in Bolivia

- Location within Bolivia

Highest point
- Elevation: 4,855 m (15,928 ft)
- Coordinates: 15°43′35″S 68°36′05″W

Geography
- Location: Bolivia, La Paz Department
- Parent range: Andes

Ch'uch'u Apachita (Aymara ch'uch'u cold, cold liquid, apachita the place of transit of an important pass in the principal routes of the Andes; name in the Andes for a stone cairn, a little pile of rocks built along the trail in the high mountains, also spelled Chuchu Apacheta, Chunchu Apacheta) is a 4,855-metre-high (15,928 ft) mountain in the Andes of Bolivia. It is situated in the La Paz Department, Larecaja Province, Sorata Municipality. Ch'uch'u Apachita lies north of the main range of the Cordillera Real, south to southwest of the mountain Ch'uch'u, northwest of Chunta Qullu and east of Jukumarini. This is where the river Ch'uch'u Jawira originates.

== See also ==
- Llawi Imaña
