= Combaya =

Coordinates: 15°48′21″S 68°45′17″W

- Town
- Interactive map of Combaya
- Country: Bolivia
- Department: La Paz Department
- Province: Larecaja Province
- Municipality: Combaya Municipality
- Time zone: UTC-4 (BOT)

Combaya is a town in the La Paz Department, Bolivia.
