= Laguna Glaciar =

Lake in Bolivia

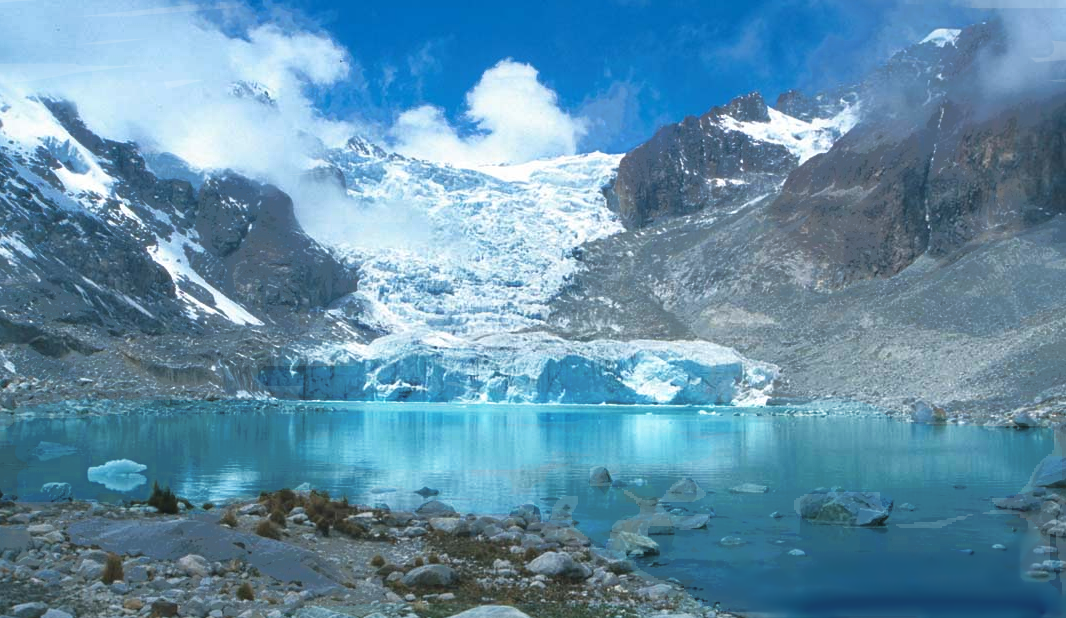

- Location within Bolivia Location within South America
- Interactive map of Laguna Glaciar
- Location: Larecaja Province, La Paz Department
- Coordinates: 15°49′49″S 68°33′44″W
- Basin countries: Bolivia
- Surface area: 0.2 km^{2} (0.077 sq mi)
- Surface elevation: 5,038 m (16,529 ft)

Laguna Glaciar (Spanish for "glacial lake") is a lake in the Larecaja Province, La Paz Department, Bolivia. It located in the Illampu - Janq'u Uma massif. Its surface area is 0.2 km^{2}. At an elevation of 5,038 m, it is the 19th highest lake in the world.
