= Teoponte Airport =

Teoponte Airport Aeropuerto Teoponte
- IATA: none; ICAO: SLTE

Summary
- Airport type: Public
- Serves: Teoponte
- Elevation AMSL: 1,400 ft / 427 m
- Coordinates: 15°29′28″S 67°49′35″W

Map
- Location of Teoponte Airport in Bolivia

Runways
Direction	Length		Surface
Direction	m	ft	Surface
07/25	939	3,081	Grass
- Sources: Landings.com Google Maps

Teoponte Airport (Spanish: Aeropuerto Teoponte, (ICAO: SLTE)) is a public use airstrip serving the village of Teoponte in the La Paz Department of Bolivia. The runway is just north of Teoponte, on the south bank of the Kaka River in the eastern foothills of the Bolivian Andes. There is high terrain nearby in all quadrants.

== See also ==
- Transport in Bolivia
- List of airports in Bolivia
