= Quiabaya =

Coordinates: 15°37′S 68°46′W

- Town
- Interactive map of Quiabaya
- Country: Bolivia
- Department: La Paz Department
- Province: Larecaja Province
- Municipality: Quiabaya Municipality
- Time zone: UTC-4 (BOT)

Quiabaya is the capital of the Quiabaya Municipality. It is located in the La Paz Department, Bolivia. As of 2012, it had a population of 378.
