= Phallata =

Mountain in Bolivia

- Location within Bolivia

Highest point
- Elevation: 4,780 m (15,680 ft)
- Coordinates: 15°40′20″S 68°31′26″W

Geography
- Location: Bolivia, La Paz Department, Larecaja Province
- Parent range: Andes

Phallata (Aymara phallaña to burst, -ta a suffix, "burst" or "exploded", also spelled Pallada, Pallana) is a mountain north of the Cordillera Real in the Andes of Bolivia which reaches a height of approximately 4,780 m (15,680 ft). It is located in the La Paz Department, Larecaja Province, Sorata Municipality. It lies at a lake of that name (Pallada).
