= Saywani (Sorata) =

Mountain in Bolivia

- Location within Bolivia

Highest point
- Elevation: 4,480 m (14,700 ft)
- Coordinates: 15°36′15″S 68°35′17″W

Geography
- Location: Bolivia, La Paz Department, Larecaja Province, Sorata Municipality
- Parent range: Andes

Saywani (Aymara saywa heap of stones indicating a landmark, -ni a suffix, "the one with a landmark", also spelled Saihuani) is a mountain north of the Cordillera Real in the Andes of Bolivia which reaches a height of approximately 4,480 m (14,700 ft). It is located in the La Paz Department, Larecaja Province, Sorata Municipality. Saywani lies north of Jichu Quta. The Wayllani Jawira originates near the mountain. It flows to the west.
