= Uma Manqha =

Mountain in Bolivia

- Location within Bolivia

Highest point
- Elevation: 4,428 m (14,528 ft)
- Coordinates: 15°31′02″S 68°32′18″W

Geography
- Location: Bolivia, La Paz Department
- Parent range: Andes

Uma Manqha (Aymara, also spelled Uma Mankha, Huama Mankha) is a 4,428-metre-high (14,528 ft) mountain in the Andes of Bolivia. It is situated in the La Paz Department, Larecaja Province, in the north of the Sorata Municipality.
