= Mapiri =

Coordinates: 15.3097°S 68.2161°W

- Town
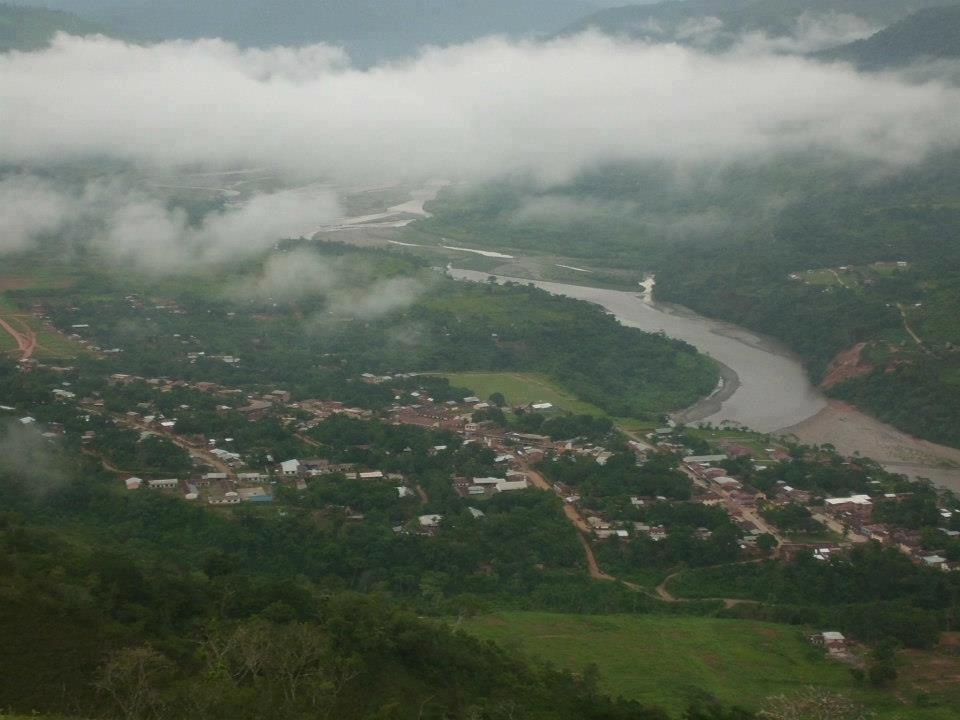
- Mapiri and the Mapiri River, La Paz Department
- Interactive map of Mapiri
- Country: Bolivia
- Department: La Paz Department
- Province: Larecaja Province
- Municipality: Mapiri Municipality

Population (2001)
  - Total: 2,561
- Time zone: UTC-4 (BOT)

Mapiri is a town in the La Paz Department, Bolivia.
