= Tawqani =

Mountain in Bolivia

- Location within Bolivia

Highest point
- Elevation: 2,500 m (8,200 ft)
- Coordinates: 15°33′52″S 68°42′00″W

Geography
- Location: Bolivia, La Paz Department
- Parent range: Andes

Tawqani (Aymara tawqaña to pile up, -ni a suffix, also spelled Taucani) is a mountain in the Andes of Bolivia which reaches a height of approximately 2,500 m (8,200 ft). It is located in the La Paz Department, Larecaja Province, Quiabaya Municipality, northwest of Tacacoma.
