= Tacacoma =

- Town
- Location within Bolivia
- Coordinates: 15°35′12″S 68°38′40″W
- Country: Bolivia
- Department: La Paz Department
- Province: Larecaja Province
- Municipality: Tacacoma Municipality
- Canton: Tacacoma Canton

Government
  - Mayor: Carlos Mamani Rodriguez (2007)
  - President: Guido Machicado Pizza (2007)

Population (2001)
  - Total: 684
- Time zone: UTC-4 (BOT)

Tacacoma is a town in the La Paz Department in Bolivia. It is the seat of the Tacacoma Municipality, the third municipal section of the Larecaja Province.
