= Combaya Municipality =

- Municipality
- Location of the Combaya Municipality within Bolivia
- Coordinates: 15.7784°S 68.7717°W
- Country: Bolivia
- Department: La Paz Department
- Province: Larecaja Province
- Seat: Combaya

Government
  - Mayor: Alejandro Cahuapaza Quispe (2007)
  - President: Julia Cori Condori (2007)

Area
  - Total: 38 sq mi (98 km^{2})
- Elevation: 11,500 ft (3,500 m)

Population (2001)
  - Total: 2,691
- Time zone: UTC-4 (BOT)

Combaya Municipality is the fifth municipal section of the Larecaja Province in the La Paz Department, Bolivia. Its seat is Combaya.

== Languages ==
The languages spoken in the Combaya Municipality are mainly Aymara and Spanish.

Language	Inhabitants
Quechua	20
Aymara	2.522
Guaraní	0
Another native	1
Spanish	1.214
Foreign	1
Only native	1.363
Native and Spanish	1.162
Only Spanish	52

Ref.: obd.descentralizacion.gov.bo
