= Tacacoma Municipality =

- Municipality
- Location of the Tacacoma Municipality within Bolivia
- Coordinates: 15.5834°S 68.7167°W
- Country: Bolivia
- Department: La Paz Department
- Province: Larecaja Province
- Seat: Tacacoma

Government
  - Mayor: Carlos Mamani Rodriguez (2007)
  - President: Guido Machicado Pizza (2007)

Area
  - Total: 315 sq mi (815 km^{2})
- Elevation: 9,800 ft (3,000 m)

Population (2001)
  - Total: 6,269
- Time zone: UTC-4 (BOT)

Tacacoma Municipality is the third municipal section of the Larecaja Province in the La Paz Department, Bolivia. Its seat is Tacacoma.

== Languages ==
The languages spoken in the Tacacoma Municipality are mainly Aymara, Spanish and Quechua.

Language	Inhabitants
Quechua	1.058
Aymara	4.389
Guaraní	1
Another native	17
Spanish	4.321
Foreign	6
Only native	1.599
Native and Spanish	3.389
Only Spanish	933

Ref.: obd.descentralizacion.gov.bo
