= Allqamarini (Larecaja) =

Mountain in Bolivia

- Location within Bolivia

Highest point
- Elevation: 4,600 m (15,100 ft)
- Coordinates: 15°40′40″S 68°37′13″W

Geography
- Location: Bolivia, La Paz Department, Larecaja Province
- Parent range: Andes

Allqamarini (Aymara and Quechua allqamari "mountain caracara",-ni a suffix to indicate ownership, "the one with the mountain caracara", also spelled Alkamarini) is a mountain in the northern extensions of the Cordillera Real in the Andes of Bolivia which reaches a height of approximately 4,600 m (15,100 ft). It is located in the La Paz Department, Larecaja Province, Sorata Municipality. It lies southwest of Quriwani. The small lake southeast of Allqamarini is Quriwani Machu.
