= Wila Quta (Larecaja) =

Mountain in Bolivia

- Location within Bolivia

Highest point
- Elevation: 4,960 m (16,270 ft)
- Coordinates: 15°46′40″S 68°33′27″W

Geography
- Location: Bolivia, La Paz Department, Larecaja Province
- Parent range: Andes

Wila Quta (Aymara wila blood, blood-red, quta lake, "red lake", also spelled Huila Kkota) is a mountain in the Andes of Bolivia, about 4,960 metres (16,273 ft) high. It is situated in the La Paz Department, Larecaja Province, Sorata Municipality, north of the massif of Janq'u Uma and Illampu of the Cordillera Real. The river Janq'u Uma Jawira ("white water river", Anco Humu Jahuira) originates south of the mountain. It flows to the north-east.

== See also ==
- Llawi Imaña
