= Larecaja Province =

- Province
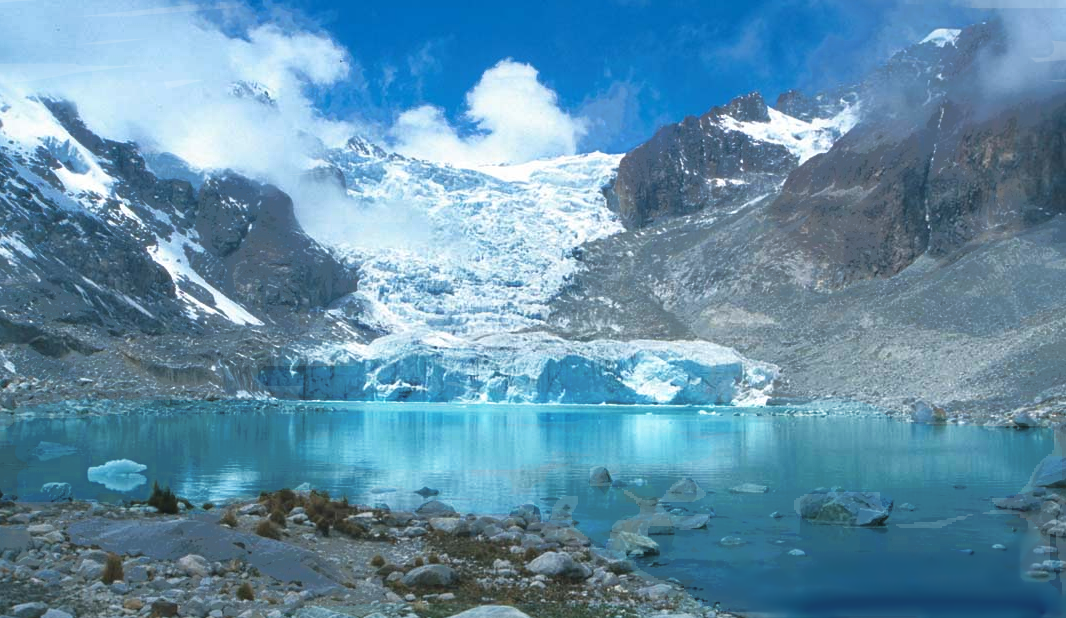
- Laguna Glaciar

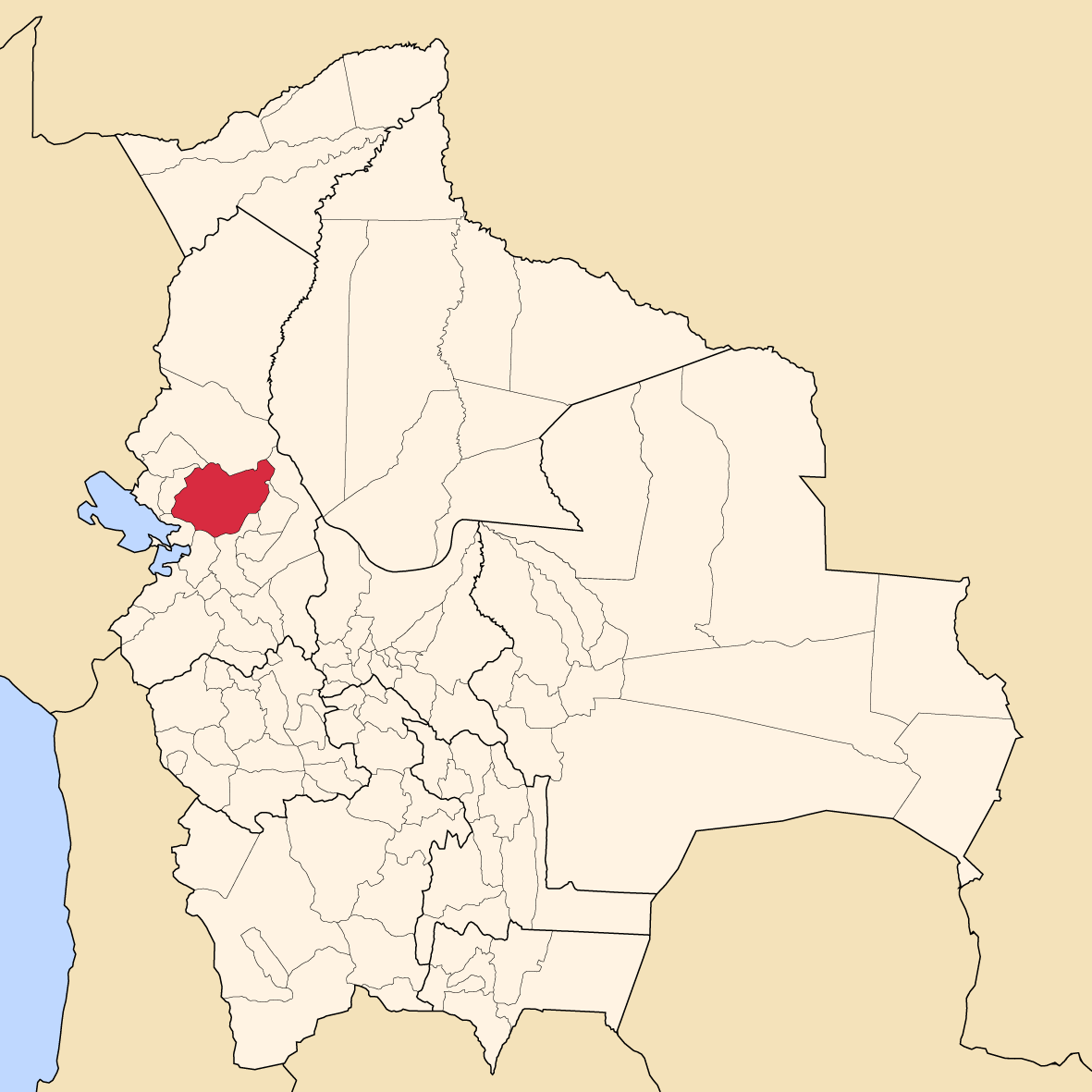
- Location of Larecaja Province within Bolivia

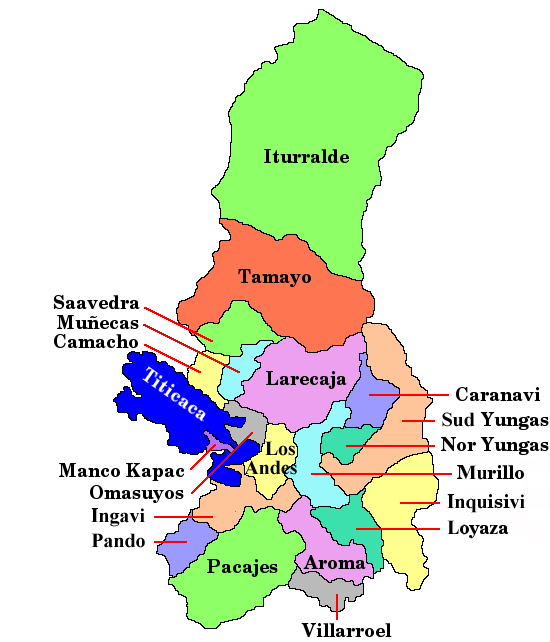
- Coordinates: 15°50′0″S 68°10′0″W
- Country: Bolivia
- Department: La Paz Department
- Municipalities: 8
- Capital: Sorata

Area
  - Total: 8,110 km^{2} (3,130 sq mi)

Population (2024 census)
  - Total: 106,735
  - Density: 13.2/km^{2} (34.1/sq mi)
  - Ethnicities: Aymara Quechua
- Time zone: UTC-4 (BOT)
- Website: Official website

Larecaja is a province in the Bolivian La Paz Department. It was founded by Antonio José de Sucre on October 18, 1826. Its capital is Sorata.

== Geography ==
The Cordillera Real traverses the province. Some of the highest peaks of the province are Illampu and Janq'u Uma. Other mountains are listed below:

- Achachi Qala
- Allqamarini
- Aqhuya Aqhuyani
- Chachakumani
- Chunta Qullu
- Ch'iyar Juqhu
- Ch'iyar Qullu
- Ch'uch'u
- Ch'uch'u Apachita
- Ch'uxña Quta
- Ch'uxñani
- Imasiña
- Jach'a Apachita
- Jach'a Pata
- Jach'a Pukara
- Jach'a Waylla Punta
- Janq'u K'ark'a (Larecaja-Murillo)
- Janq'u K'ark'a (Larecaja-Omasuyos)
- Jichu Quta
- Jukumarini
- Kuntur Jipiña
- Llawi Imaña
- Ñuñuni Qalani
- Pallqa K'ark'a
- Patapatani
- Phallata
- P'iq'iñ Qullu
- Qala Phusa
- Qillwani
- Quña Quñani
- Quriwani
- Q'asiri
- Saywani
- Saywani (Sorata)
- Tawqani
- Turini
- Uma Jalanta
- Uma Manqha
- Wankar Quta Qullu
- Warachani
- Wari Qalluni Pata
- Wila Lluxita
- Wila Quta
- Wila Umani
- Wila Wila
- Wila Wilani
- Wiluyu Janq'u Uma
- Yapuchañani

Parts of the Apolobamba Integrated Management Natural Area and the Pilón Lajas Biosphere Reserve and Communal Lands lie in the Larecaja Province.

== Subdivision ==
Larecaja Province is divided into eight municipalities which are partly further subdivided into cantons.

Section	Municipality	Seat
1st	Sorata Municipality	Sorata
2nd	Guanay Municipality	Guanay
3rd	Tacacoma Municipality	Tacacoma
4th	Quiabaya Municipality	Quiabaya
5th	Combaya Municipality	Combaya
6th	Tipuani Municipality	Tipuani
7th	Mapiri Municipality	Mapiri
8th	Teoponte Municipality	Teoponte

== Languages ==
The languages spoken in the Larecaja Province are mainly Aymara, Spanish and Quechua. The following table shows the number of those belonging to the recognised group of speakers.

Language	Sorata Municipality	Guanay Municipality	Tacacoma Municipality	Quiabaya Municipality	Combaya Municipality	Tipuani Municipality	Mapiri Municipality	Teoponte Municipality
Quechua	363	1.653	1.058	33	20	1.587	3.649	756
Aymara	16.029	3.405	4.389	2.269	2.522	2.534	1.767	2.837
Guaraní	7	5	1	0	0	20	6	6
Another native	8	94	17	2	1	18	7	22
Spanish	11.223	10.064	4.321	1.391	1.214	8.594	8.567	6.211
Foreign	70	86	6	6	1	61	17	33
Only native	6.680	737	1.599	1.023	1.363	190	363	472
Native and Spanish	9.540	4.123	3.389	1.256	1.162	3.499	4.653	2.925
Only Spanish	1.690	5.942	933	135	52	5.097	3.915	3.290

== See also ==
- Ch'alla Quta
- Ch'uch'u Jawira
- Ch'usiq Uta
- Janq'u Quta
- Warus Quta
- Laguna Glaciar, 17th highest lake in the world.
