= Teoponte =

- Town
- Location within Bolivia
- Coordinates: 15°28′S 67°49′W
- Country: Bolivia
- Department: La Paz Department
- Province: Larecaja Province
- Municipality: Teoponte Municipality

Population (2001)
  - Total: 1,421
- Time zone: UTC-4 (BOT)

Teoponte is a village in the La Paz Department, Bolivia.

The village is served by Teoponte Airport.
