= Saywani =

Mountain in Bolivia

- Location within Bolivia

Highest point
- Elevation: 4,760 m (15,620 ft)
- Coordinates: 15°39′15″S 68°34′12″W

Geography
- Location: Bolivia, La Paz Department, Larecaja Province, Quiabaya Municipality
- Parent range: Andes

Saywani (Aymara: saywa heap of stones indicating a landmark, -ni a suffix, "the one with a landmark", also spelled Sayhuani) is a mountain north of the Cordillera Real in the Andes of Bolivia which reaches a height of approximately 4,760 m (15,620 ft). It is located in the La Paz Department, Larecaja Province, Quiabaya Municipality. Saywani lies northeast of Achachi Qala. The little lake south of Saywani is named Ch'uxña Quta ("green lake").
