= Teoponte Municipality =

- Municipality
- Location of the Teoponte Municipality within Bolivia
- Coordinates: 15.3742°S 67.7403°W
- Country: Bolivia
- Department: La Paz Department
- Province: Larecaja Province
- Seat: Teoponte

Government
  - Mayor: Secundino Sanga Silvestre (2007)
  - President: Roner River Antelo (2007)

Area
  - Total: 610 sq mi (1,579 km^{2})
- Elevation: 1,600 ft (500 m)

Population (2001)
  - Total: 7,109
- Time zone: UTC-4 (BOT)

Teoponte Municipality is the eighth municipal section of the Larecaja Province in the La Paz Department, Bolivia. Its seat is Teoponte.

== Languages ==
The languages spoken in the Teoponte Municipality are mainly Spanish, Aymara and Quechua.

Language	Inhabitants
Quechua	756
Aymara	2.837
Guaraní	6
Another native	22
Spanish	6.211
Foreign	33
Only native	472
Native and Spanish	2.925
Only Spanish	3.290

Ref.: obd.descentralizacion.gov.bo

== See also ==
- Kaka River
