= Tipuani Municipality =

- Municipality
- Flag

- Location of the Tipuani Municipality within Bolivia
- Coordinates: 15.5477°S 68.0255°W
- Country: Bolivia
- Department: La Paz Department
- Province: Larecaja Province
- Seat: Tipuani

Government
  - Mayor: Amadeo Herrera Cerruto (2007)
  - President: Oscar Vera Gonzales (2007)

Area
  - Total: 115 sq mi (297 km^{2})
- Elevation: 3,300 ft (1,000 m)

Population (2001)
  - Total: 9,321
- Time zone: UTC-4 (BOT)

Tipuani Municipality is the sixth municipal section of the Larecaja Province in the La Paz Department, Bolivia. Its seat is Tipuani.

== Languages ==
The languages spoken in the Tipuani Municipality are mainly Spanish, Aymara and Quechua.

Language	Inhabitants
Quechua	1.587
Aymara	2.534
Guaraní	20
Another native	18
Spanish	8.594
Foreign	61
Only native	190
Native and Spanish	3.499
Only Spanish	5.097

Ref.: obd.descentralizacion.gov.bo
