= Mapiri Municipality =

- Municipality
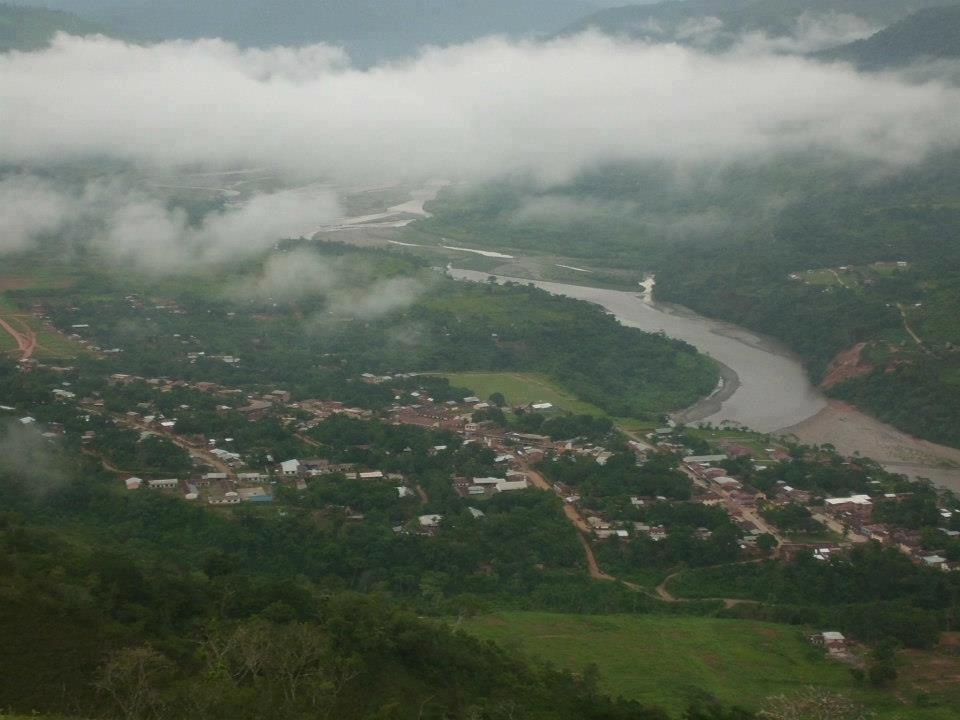
- Mapiri and the Mapiri River, La Paz Department

- Location of the Mapiri Municipality within Bolivia
- Coordinates: 15.3087°S 68.2412°W
- Country: Bolivia
- Department: La Paz Department
- Province: Larecaja Province
- Seat: Mapiri

Government
  - Mayor: Enrique Calle Onorio (2007)
  - President: Ramiro Jorge Vargas Orosco (2007)

Area
  - Total: 525 sq mi (1,361 km^{2})

Population (2001)
  - Total: 9,633
- Time zone: UTC-4 (BOT)

Mapiri Municipality is the seventh municipal section of the Larecaja Province in the La Paz Department, Bolivia. Its seat is Mapiri.

== Languages ==
The languages spoken in the Mapiri Municipality are mainly Spanish, Quechua and Aymara.

Language	Inhabitants
Quechua	3.649
Aymara	1.767
Guaraní	6
Another native	7
Spanish	8.567
Foreign	17
Only native	363
Native and Spanish	4.653
Only Spanish	3.915

Ref.: obd.descentralizacion.gov.bo
