= Ch'alla Quta =

Lake in Bolivia

- Location within Bolivia Location within South America
- Interactive map of Ch'alla Quta
- Location: Bolivia, La Paz Department, Larecaja Province, Sorata Municipality
- Coordinates: 15°53′24″S 68°21′16″W
- Surface elevation: ≈ 4,700 m (15,400 ft)

Ch'alla Quta (Aymara ch'alla sand, quta lake, "sand lake", also spelled Challa Kota) is a lake in the Cordillera Real in the Andes of Bolivia. It is situated in the La Paz Department, Larecaja Province, Sorata Municipality. Ch'alla Quta lies south of the mountain Larama Punta.
