= Tipuani =

- Town
- Location within Bolivia
- Coordinates: 15°32′31″S 68°0′15″W
- Country: Bolivia
- Department: La Paz Department
- Province: Larecaja Province
- Municipality: Tipuani Municipality
- Canton: Tipuani Canton

Government
  - Mayor: Amadeo Herrera Cerruto (2007)

Population (2001)
  - Total: 2,563
- Time zone: UTC-4 (BOT)

Tipuani is a town in the La Paz Department, Bolivia.
