= Ch'uch'u Jawira =

- Etymology: Aymara

Location
- Country: Bolivia
- Region: La Paz Department

Physical characteristics
- Source: north of the Cordillera Real
  - location: Larecaja Province

Basin features
- Tributaries
  - left: Q'asiri Jawira
  - right: Janq'u Uma Jawira

Ch'uch'u Jawira (Aymara ch'uch'u cold, cold liquid, jawira river, "cold river", Hispanicized spelling Chuchu Jahuira) is a Bolivian river in the La Paz Department, Larecaja Province, Sorata Municipality. Its waters flow the Kaka River which belongs to the watershed of the Beni River.

Ch'uch'u Jawira originates north of the main range of the Cordillera Real near the mountains Ch'uch'u and Llachasani. Along the mountains Wila Wilani and Jach'a Waylla Punta it flows to the village of Janq'uma (Ancoma) in the southeast. From now on its direction is to the northeast. Before reaching Janq'uma it receives waters from Q'asiri Jawira (Khasiri Jauira) from the left and from Janq'u Uma Jawira ("white water river", Anco Humu Jahuira) which originates between the mountain Wila Quta and the Janq'u Uma-Illampu massif.
