= Quiabaya Municipality =

- Municipality
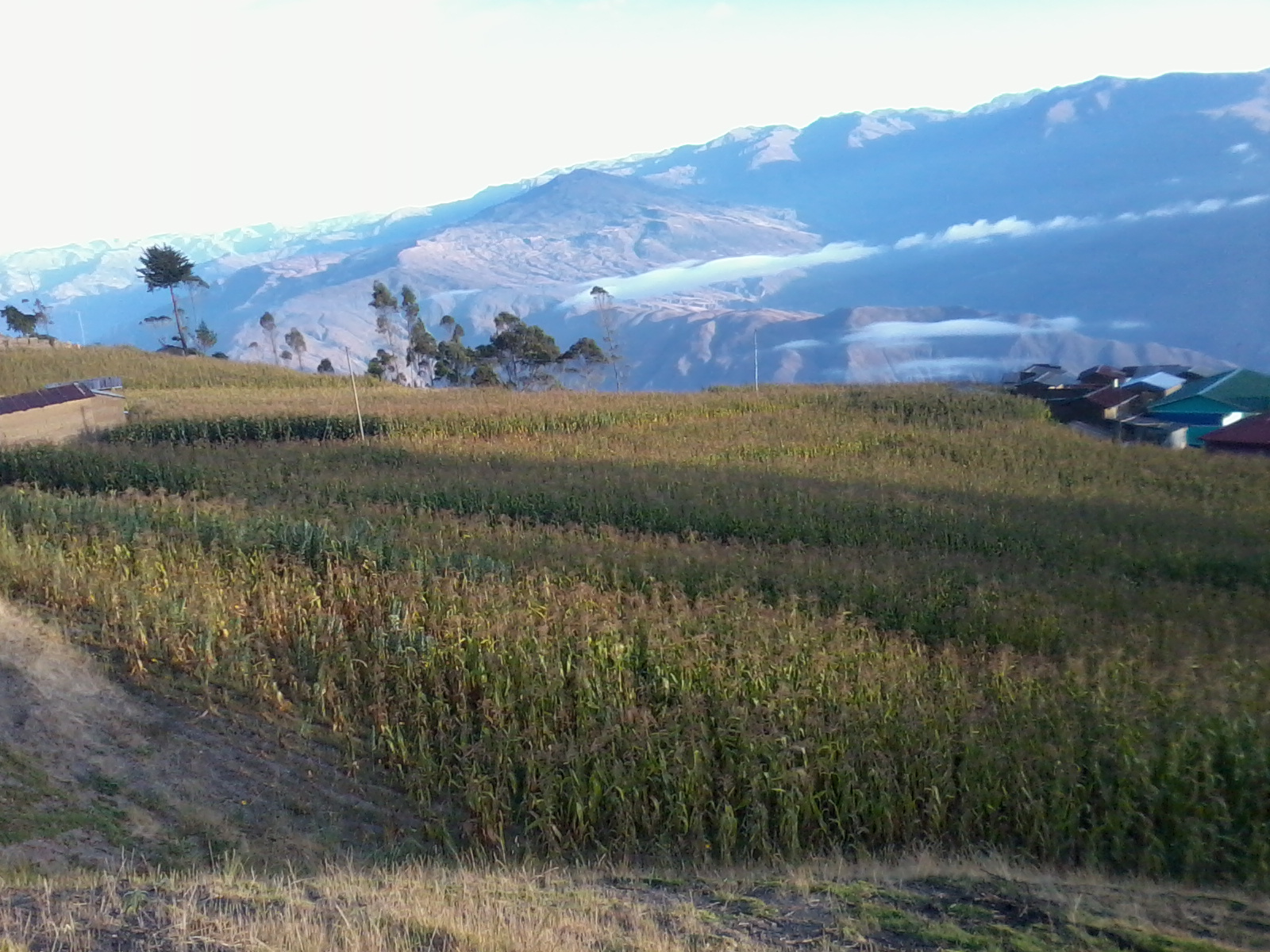
- The village Tarata in the Quiabaya Municipality

- Location of the Quiabaya Municipality within Bolivia
- Coordinates: 15.6167°S 68.7667°W
- Country: Bolivia
- Department: La Paz Department
- Province: Larecaja Province
- Seat: Quiabaya

Government
  - Mayor: Jorge Callisaya Peralta (2007)
  - President: Aurelio Machicado Miranda (2007)

Area
  - Total: 51 sq mi (132 km^{2})
- 46 sq mi (120 km^{2})
- Elevation: 9,800 ft (3,000 m)

Population (from 2012 census)
  - Total: 2,684
  - Density: 57.9/sq mi (22.36/km^{2})
  - Urban density: 980/sq mi (378/km^{2})
- Time zone: UTC-4 (BOT)

Quiabaya Municipality is the fourth municipal section of the Larecaja Province in the La Paz Department, Bolivia. Its seat is Quiabaya.

== Languages ==
The languages spoken in the Quiabaya Municipality are mainly Aymara and Spanish.

Language	Inhabitants
Quechua	33
Aymara	2.269
Guaraní	0
Another native	2
Spanish	1.391
Foreign	6
Only native	1.023
Native and Spanish	1.256
Only Spanish	135

Ref.: obd.descentralizacion.gov.bo

== See also ==
- Achachi Qala
- Saywani
- Tawqani
