= Quriwani =

Mountain in Bolivia

- Location within Bolivia

Highest point
- Elevation: 4,920 m (16,140 ft)
- Coordinates: 15°40′15″S 68°35′55″W

Geography
- Location: Bolivia, La Paz Department, Larecaja Province
- Parent range: Andes

Quriwani (Quechua quri gold, Aymara -wa, -ni suffixes, "the one where it is gold", also spelled Kkorihuani) is a mountain in the northern extensions of the Cordillera Real in the Andes of Bolivia which reaches a height of approximately 4,920 m (16,140 ft). It is located in the La Paz Department, Larecaja Province, Sorata Municipality. It lies north of Ch'uch'u. The small lake southwest of Quriwani is named Quriwani Machu.
