= Sorata Municipality =

Sorata
- Municipality
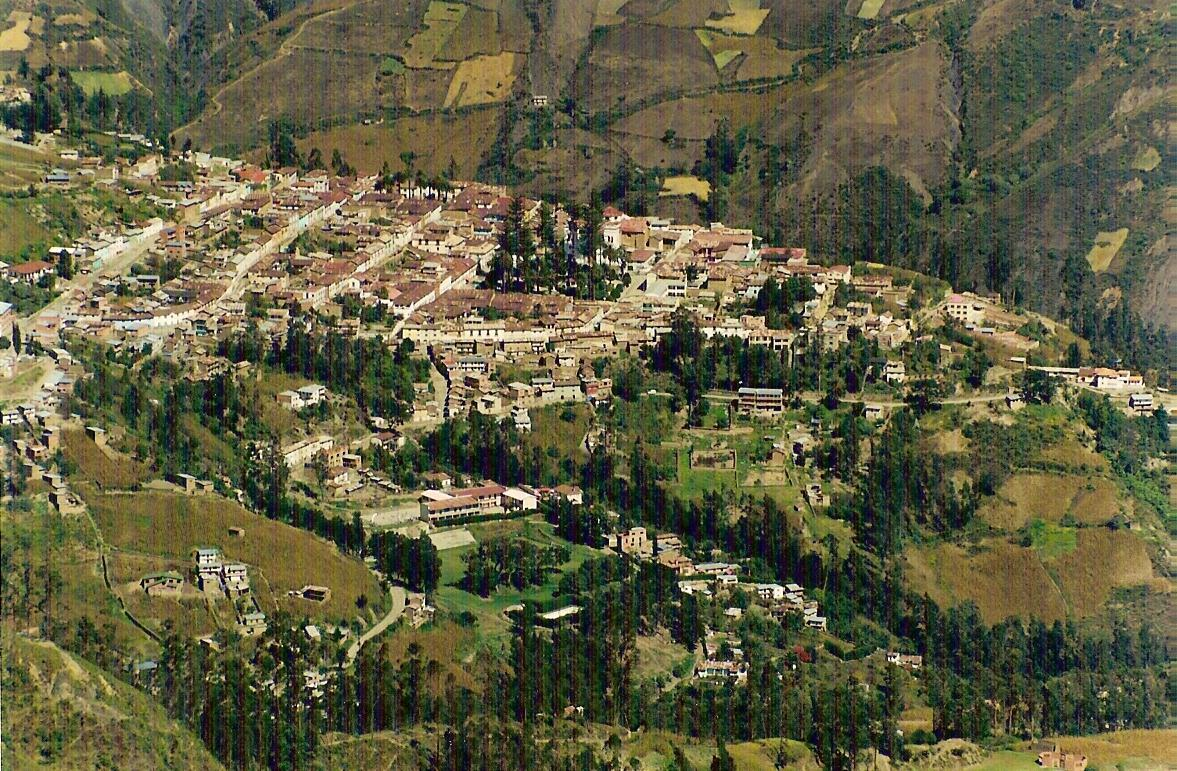
- Sorata town as seen from Purani Churiquimbaya botanic garden

- Flag

- Location of the Sorata Municipality within Bolivia
- Sorata Municipality and its local surroundings
- Coordinates: 15°45′S 68°32′W
- Country: Bolivia
- Department: La Paz
- Province: Larecaja
- Seat: Sorata

Government
  - Mayor: Eustaquio Huayta Poma (M.P.S., 2026)

Area
  - Municipality: 1,902 km^{2} (734 sq mi)

Population (2024)
  - Municipality: 30,083
  - Density: 16/km^{2} (41/sq mi)
  - Urban: 3,951
  - Rural: 26,132
  - Indigenous ethnicities: Aymara: 19,451 (65%); Unspecified Indigenous: 3,182 (11%)
- 2024 Bolivian census
- Time zone: UTC-4 (BOT)
- Geocode: 020601 (INE code); BO020601 (OCHA P-code)

Sorata Municipality (Aymara: Surat'a) is the first municipal section of the Larecaja Province in the La Paz Department, Bolivia. Its capital is Sorata. The Illampu - Janq'u Uma massif is located within the municipality, site of the 17th highest lake in the world, Laguna Glaciar.

== Geography ==
The Cordillera Real traverses the municipality. The highest peaks of the municipality are Illampu and Janq'u Uma. Other mountains are listed below:

- Allqamarini
- Chunta Qullu
- Ch'alla Quta
- Ch'iyar Qullu
- Ch'uch'u
- Ch'uch'u Apachita
- Ch'uxña Quta
- Ch'uxñani
- Illampu
- Jach'a Apachita
- Jach'a Pukara
- Jach'a Waylla Punta
- Janq'u K'ark'a
- Janq'u Uma
- Jichu Quta
- Jukumarini
- Llawi Imaña
- Phallata
- P'iq'iñ Qullu
- Qala Phusa
- Quña Quñani
- Quriwani
- Q'asiri
- Saywani
- Uma Jalanta
- Uma Manqha
- Wankar Quta Qullu
- Warachani
- Wila Quta
- Wila Wilani
- Wiluyu Janq'u Uma
- Yapuchañani

== Languages ==
The languages spoken in the Sorata Municipality are mainly Aymara and Spanish.

Language	Inhabitants
Quechua	363
Aymara	16,029
Guaraní	7
Another native	8
Spanish	11,223
Foreign	70
Only native	6,680
Native and Spanish	9,540
Only Spanish	1,690

== See also ==
- Ch'uch'u Jawira
- Ch'usiq Uta
- Warus Quta
