= Chua Cocani =

Coordinates: 16.1925°S 68.7447°W

- Town
- Interactive map of Chua Cocani
- Country: Bolivia
- Department: La Paz Department
- Province: Omasuyos Province
- Municipality: Chua Cocani Municipality
- Time zone: UTC-4 (BOT)

Chua Cocani is a small town in Bolivia. In 2009 it had an estimated population of 1050.

Near Lake Titicaca there is a Naval base of The 3rd Independent Regiment of the Bolivian Naval Force.
