= Sorata =

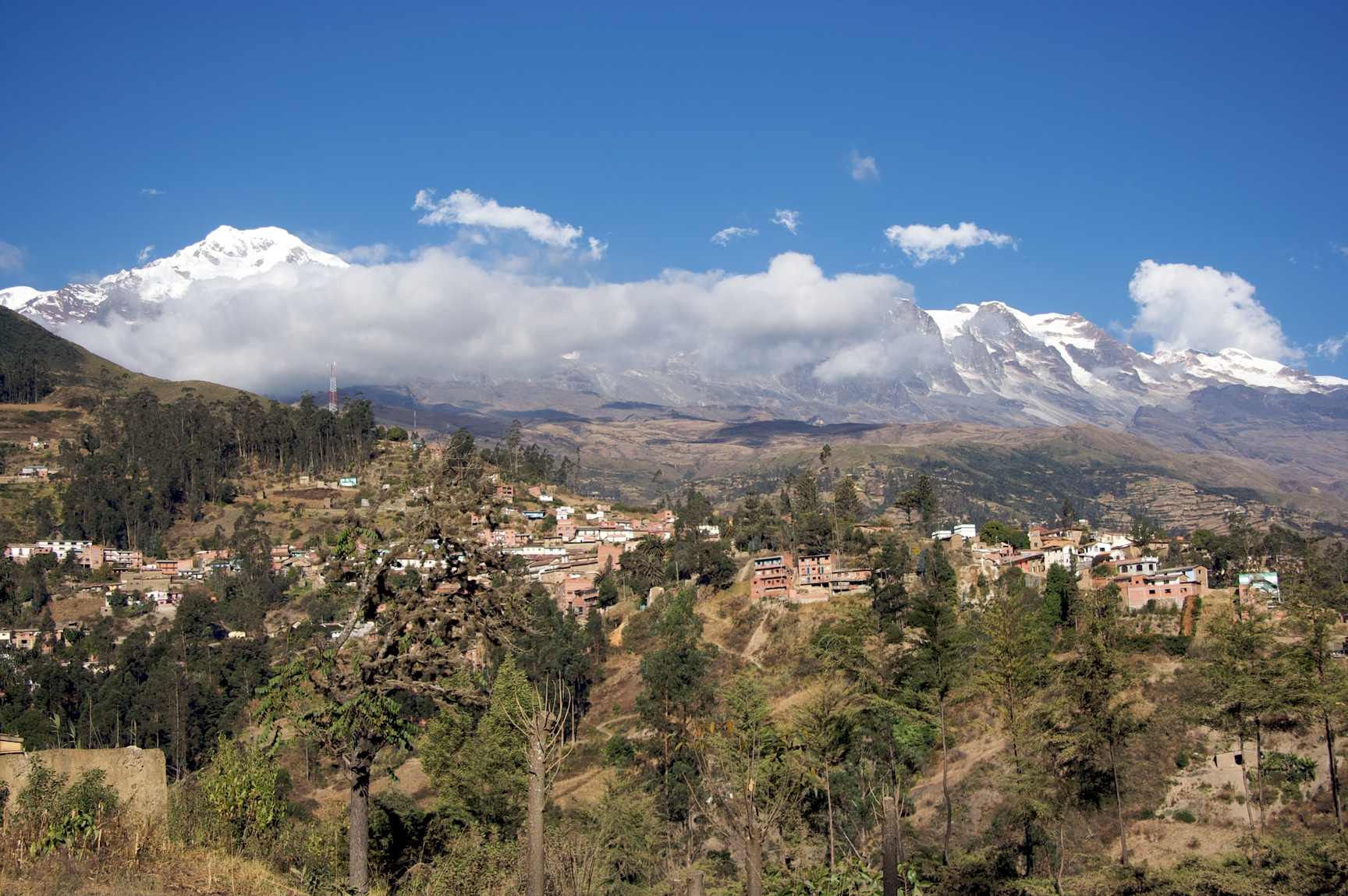
- Panoramic view of Sorata

- Location within Bolivia
- Coordinates: 15°46′S 68°38′W
- Country: Bolivia
- Department: La Paz Department
- Province: Larecaja Province
- Municipality: Sorata Municipality
- Canton: Sorata Canton
- Elevation: 8,786 ft (2,678 m)

Population (2029)
  - Total: 2,217
- Time zone: UTC-4 (BOT)

Sorata (Aymara: Surat'a) is a small town in the La Paz Department in the Bolivian Andes, northwest of the city of La Paz and east of Lake Titicaca. It is the seat of the Larecaja Province and the Sorata Municipality. At the time of census 2001 it had a population of 2,217. It is a somewhat popular weekend getaway and a relaxing base camp for a growing number of hikers. It includes several small hotels, including a converted Italian mansion.

== History ==
In colonial days, Sorata provided a link to the Alto Beni goldfields and rubber plantations, and a gateway to the Amazon Basin. In August 1781 it was the site of an unorthodox siege by the nephew of Tupac Amaru, Andres, and his 16,000 soldiers. They constructed dikes above the town, and when these had been filled with runoff from the slopes of the nearby peak Illampu, they opened the floodgates and the town was washed away.

== Cityscape ==

Sorata is no longer a major commercial center, as there is now a more direct route to the Yungas from La Paz. Today it is best known to foreign tourists, trekkers, and climbers, who visit this formerly little-known destination. The main square, Plaza General Enrique Penaranda, is Sorata's showcase. It is graced by towering date palms and immaculate gardens. The main town fiesta is held on September 14. Of note is Casa Gunthere, a historic mansion that now houses the Residencial Sorata. It was built in 1895 as the home of the Richters, a quinine trading family.

Sorata is located at the base of the mountains Illampu, 6,368 m (20,892 ft), and Janq'u Uma, 6,427 m (21,086 ft), which are the northern anchors of the Cordillera Real. By the most reliable figures, Janq'u Uma is 11 m (36 ft) lower than Illimani, near La Paz, but surveys in the area are imperfect, and there is much debate between the citizens of both areas as to which mountain is higher.

== Climate ==
Sorata features an unusual subtropical highland climate, with oceanic elements and high levels of diurnal temperature variation.

Climate data for Sorata, elevation 2,647 m (8,684 ft)
Month	Jan	Feb	Mar	Apr	May	Jun	Jul	Aug	Sep	Oct	Nov	Dec	Year
Mean daily maximum °C (°F)	21.3 (70.3)	20.8 (69.4)	21.1 (70.0)	21.4 (70.5)	20.9 (69.6)	20.4 (68.7)	20.1 (68.2)	21.3 (70.3)	22.2 (72.0)	23.0 (73.4)	22.9 (73.2)	22.2 (72.0)	21.5 (70.6)
Daily mean °C (°F)	15.7 (60.3)	15.6 (60.1)	15.4 (59.7)	15.3 (59.5)	14.4 (57.9)	13.7 (56.7)	13.4 (56.1)	14.5 (58.1)	15.4 (59.7)	16.2 (61.2)	16.4 (61.5)	16.0 (60.8)	15.2 (59.3)
Mean daily minimum °C (°F)	10.1 (50.2)	10.3 (50.5)	9.8 (49.6)	9.2 (48.6)	8.0 (46.4)	7.0 (44.6)	6.7 (44.1)	7.8 (46.0)	8.7 (47.7)	9.4 (48.9)	9.9 (49.8)	9.9 (49.8)	8.9 (48.0)
Average precipitation mm (inches)	178.4 (7.02)	160.5 (6.32)	142.1 (5.59)	53.2 (2.09)	19.2 (0.76)	8.0 (0.31)	6.2 (0.24)	14.7 (0.58)	34.1 (1.34)	53.7 (2.11)	63.6 (2.50)	116.9 (4.60)	850.6 (33.46)
Average precipitation days	20.5	18.8	18.8	9.0	4.2	2.3	2.5	3.6	6.3	8.6	9.7	15.9	120.2
Average relative humidity (%)	84.1	84.9	84.3	81.6	77.6	73.4	75.2	75.0	75.9	76.7	78.0	81.0	79.0
Source: Servicio Nacional de Meteorología e Hidrología de Bolivia
