= Uma Jalanta (La Paz) =

Mountain in Bolivia

- Location within Bolivia

Highest point
- Elevation: 5,723 m (18,776 ft)
- Coordinates: 15°52′17″S 68°28′06″W

Geography
- Location: Bolivia, La Paz Department, Larecaja Province, Sorata Municipality
- Parent range: Andes, Cordillera Real

Uma Jalanta (Aymara uma water, jalaña to fly, running of water, -nta a suffix, also spelled Huma Halanta, Umajalanta) is a mountain in the Cordillera Real in the Andes of Bolivia, about 5,723 metres (18,776 ft) high. It is located in the La Paz Department, Larecaja Province, Sorata Municipality. It lies south-east of the mountains Janq'u Uma and Janq'u Piti, near the mountain Misk'i T'ant'a.
