= Wila Wilani (Larecaja) =

Mountain in Bolivia

- Location within Bolivia

Highest point
- Elevation: 4,818 m (15,807 ft)
- Coordinates: 15°42′54″S 68°32′57″W

Geography
- Location: Bolivia, La Paz Department, Larecaja Province
- Parent range: Andes

Wila Wilani (Aymara wila blood, blood-red, the reduplication indicates that there is a group or a complex of something, "the one with a complex of red color") is a 4,818-metre-high (15,807 ft) mountain in the Andes of Bolivia. It is situated in the La Paz Department, Larecaja Province, Sorata Municipality, north of the Cordillera Real. Wila Wilani lies at the river Ch'uch'u Jawira.

== See also ==
- Llawi Imaña
