= Ch'uch'u =

Mountain in Bolivia

- Location within Bolivia

Highest point
- Elevation: 5,100 m (16,700 ft)
- Coordinates: 15°41′52″S 68°35′40″W

Geography
- Location: Bolivia, La Paz Department, Larecaja Province
- Parent range: Andes

Ch'uch'u (Aymara for cold, cold liquid, also spelled Chuchu) is a mountain in the Andes of Bolivia, about 5,100 metres (16,732 ft) high. It is situated in the La Paz Department, Larecaja Province, Sorata Municipality. Ch'uch'u lies north of the main range of the Cordillera Real, north to northeast of the mountain Ch'uch'u Apachita. This is where the river Ch'uch'u Jawira originates.

== See also ==
- Llawi Imaña
