= Llawi Imaña =

Mountain in Bolivia

- Location within Bolivia

Highest point
- Elevation: 4,854 m (15,925 ft)
- Coordinates: 15°45′11″S 68°34′11″W

Geography
- Location: Bolivia, La Paz Department, Larecaja Province
- Parent range: Andes

Llawi Imaña (Aymara llawi padlock, imaña to guard, to hide, to bury, also spelled Llavi Imana) is a 4,854-metre-high (15,925 ft) mountain in the Andes of Bolivia. It is situated in the La Paz Department, Larecaja Province, Sorata Municipality, north of the Cordillera Real.

== See also ==
- Wila Wilani
