= Illampu =

Mountain in Bolivia

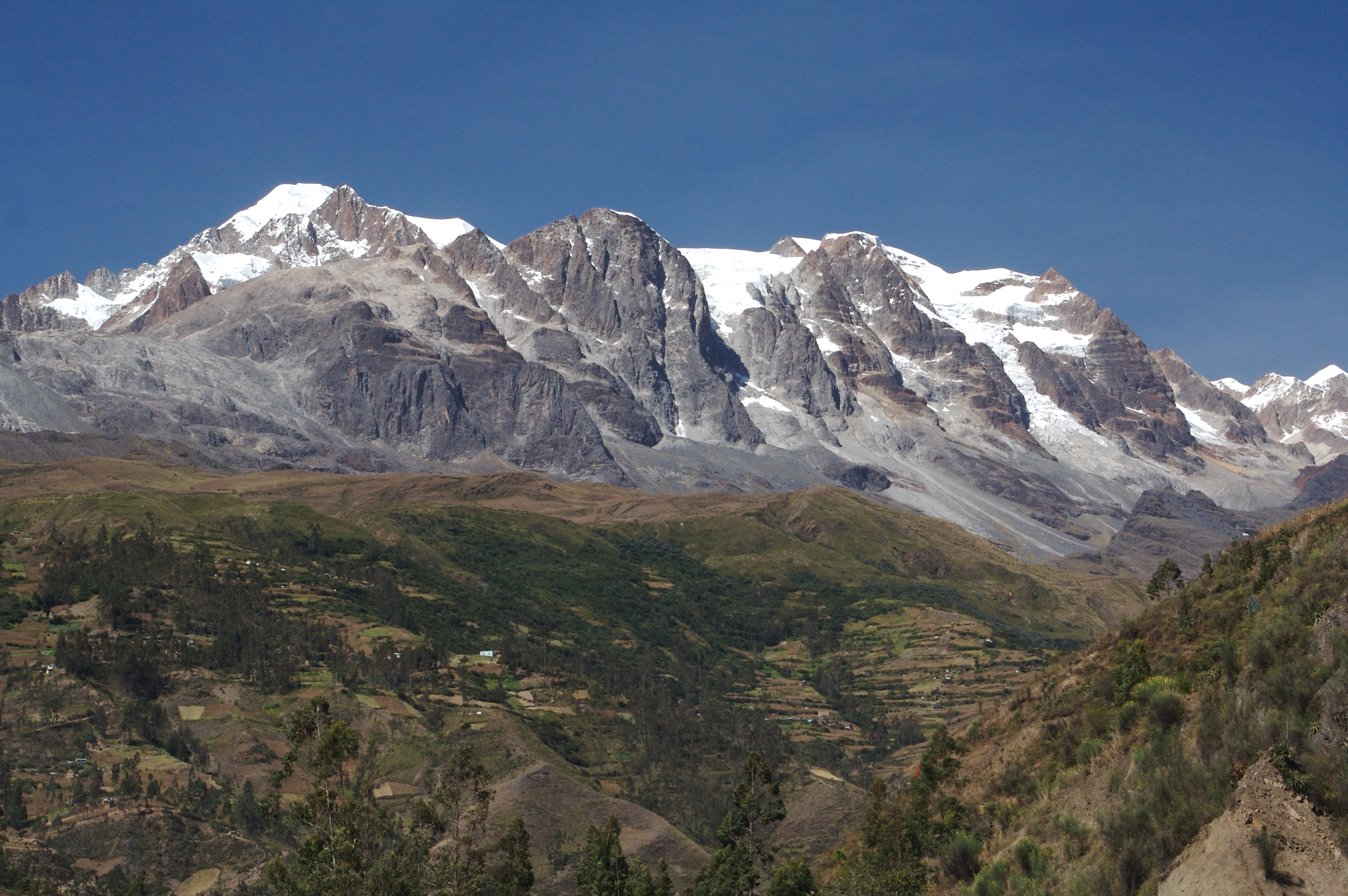

Highest point
- Elevation: 6,368 m (20,892 ft)
- Prominence: 575 m (1,886 ft)
- Coordinates: 15°49′00″S 68°32′36″W

Geography
- Location within Bolivia
- Location: Bolivia, La Paz Department, Larecaja Province, Sorata Municipality, Ancoma Canton
- Parent range: Cordillera Real, Andes
- Topo map(s): DAV Cordillera Real Nord; IGM Sorata 5846 I

Climbing
- First ascent: 1928 by Hans Pfann, Alfred Horescowsky, Hugo Hortnagel, Erwin Hein
- Easiest route: Southwest Ridge: Glacier/snow climb (AD)

Illampu is the fourth highest mountain in Bolivia. It is located in the northern section of the Cordillera Real, part of the Andes, east of Lake Titicaca. It lies just north of the slightly higher Janq'u Uma, near the town of Sorata. Laguna Glaciar, located in the Illampu-Janq'u Uma massif, is the 17th highest lake in the world.

Despite being lower than Janq'u Uma, Illampu has a steeper peak, with more local relief, and is a somewhat harder climb. In fact it has "the hardest normal route on any of the 6,000 metre peaks in Bolivia." The easiest route, by the Southwest Ridge, is rated AD (Fairly Difficult), with snow slopes up to 65 degrees. It is accessed from a high camp on the north side of the massif. The peak was first climbed on June 7, 1928, via this route, by Hans Pfann, Alfred Horeschowsky, Hugo Hörtnagel (Germans) and Erwin Hein (Austrian). Other routes include the "German Route" on the southwest face and the South Face route, both approached from the west side of the massif.
