= Ancohuma =

Mountain in Bolivia

- Janq'u Uma, Jankho Uma, Jankhouma, Janq'uma
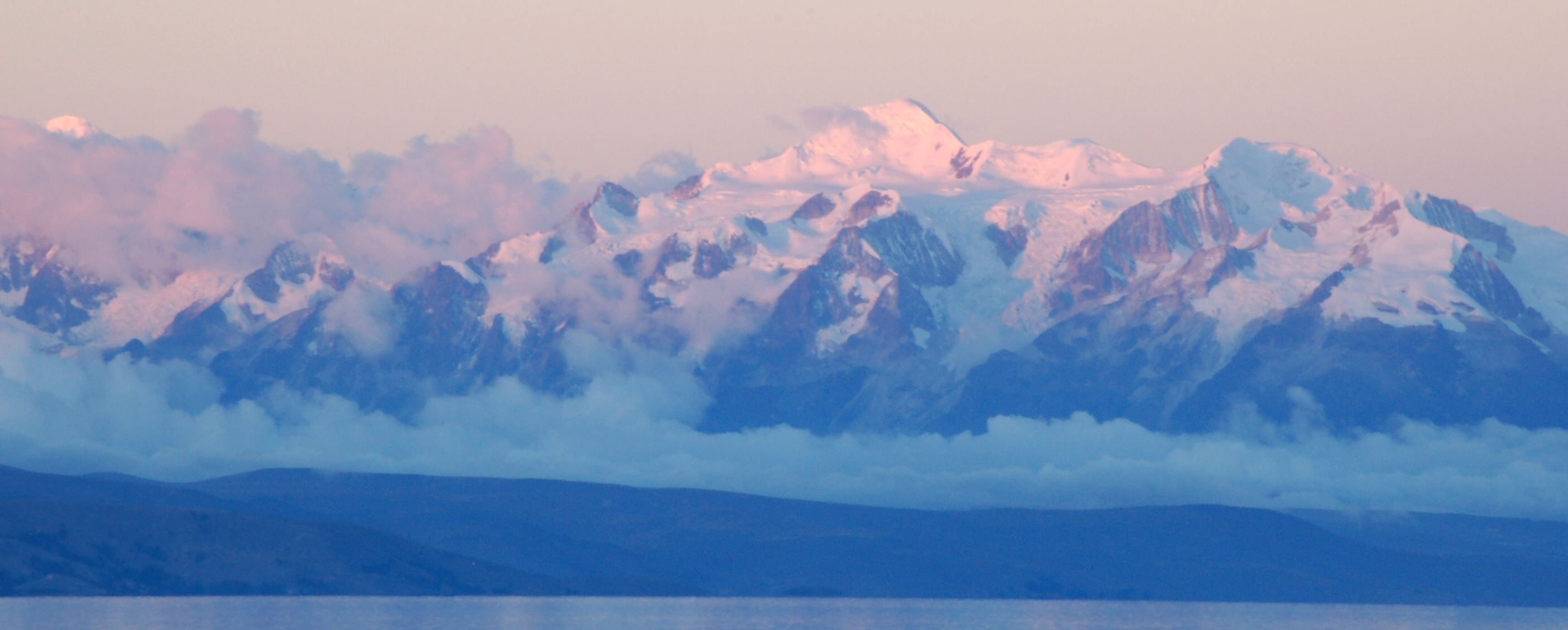
- The mountain over Lake Titiqaqa / Titicaca

Highest point
- Elevation: 6,427 m (21,086 ft)
- Prominence: 1,957 m (6,421 ft)
- Listing: Ultra
- Coordinates: 15°51′12″S 68°32′27″W

Geography
- Location within Bolivia
- Location: La Paz Department, Bolivia
- Parent range: Cordillera Real, Andes

Climbing
- First ascent: June 11, 1919 by Rudolf Dienst and Adolf Schulze
- Easiest route: Glacier/snow climb (PD/AD)

Ancohuma or Janq'u Uma (Aymara janq'u white, uma water, "white water", also spelled Janq'uma, other spellings, Jankho Uma, Jankhouma) is the third highest mountain in Bolivia (after Sajama and Illimani). It is located in the northern section of the Cordillera Real, part of the Andes, east of Lake Titicaca. It lies just south of the slightly lower Illampu, near the town of Sorata.

Despite being higher than Illampu, Ancohuma is a gentler peak, with less local relief, and it is a somewhat easier climb. The peak was first climbed in 1919, by Rudolf Dienst and Adolf Schulze. Their route, still the easiest, climbs the southwest face, and is rated PD (not very difficult). Other routes exist on the northwest ridge and the west face. Depending on the route desired, the mountain is approached either from the west or from the northeast; each approach requires two to three days from Sorata.
