= Lucio Huaycho =

Bolivian politician (born 1965)

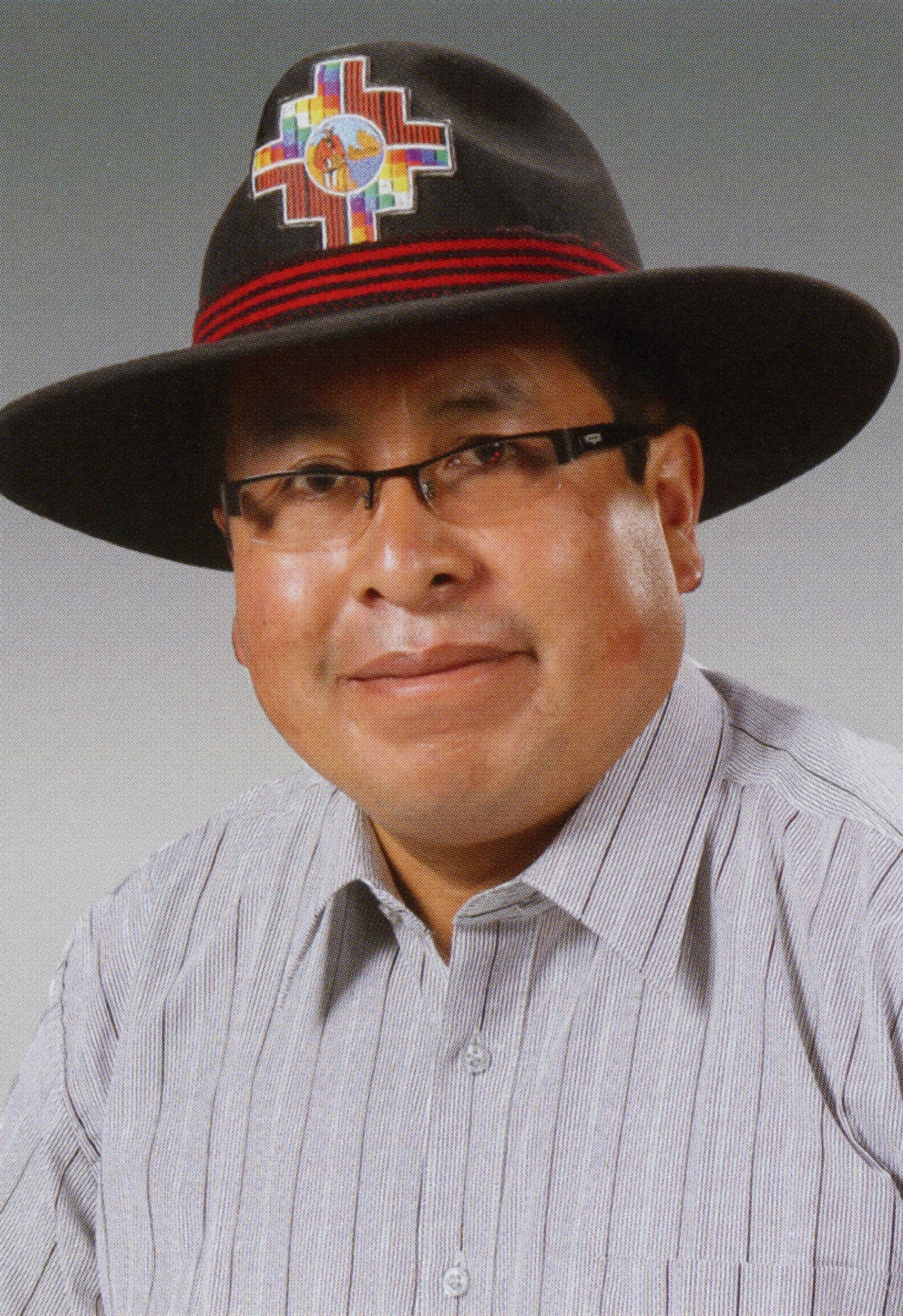
- Official portrait, 2014

Member of the Chamber of Deputies from La Paz's 17th constituency
- In office 19 January 2010 – 18 January 2015
- Substitute: Evarista Mayta
- Preceded by: Hilario Callisaya
- Succeeded by: Modesta Supo (Note: Redistribution; constituency 14.)
- Constituency: Camacho; Los Andes; Manco Kapac

Personal details
- Born: Lucio Huaycho Nina; 11 December 1965 (age 60) Puerto Acosta, La Paz, Bolivia
- Party: Movement Toward Socialism
- Education: Warisata Normal School; Bolivian Catholic University
- Occupation: Educator; politician; trade unionist
- Website: Official blog

Lucio Huaycho Nina (Note: In this Spanish name, the first or paternal surname is Huaycho and the second or maternal family name is Nina.) (born 11 December 1965) is a Bolivian educator, politician, and trade unionist who represented La Paz's 17th constituency in the Chamber of Deputies from 2010 to 2015.

Huaycho graduated from the Warisata Normal School and led the normal school national students' union from 1990 to 1991. He taught primary school in rural Camacho and Pacajes provinces and founded and directed schools in Mocomoco and Puerto Acosta. He was district director of education in Mocomoco Municipality from 2004 to 2009, president of the departmental association of district directors in 2009, and led the provincial teachers' union from 2007 to 2008.

Like many unionized educators, Huaycho sympathized with left-wing politics and joined the Movement Toward Socialism. Through his sector's pact with that party, he was nominated for a seat in parliament in 2009. He contested and handily won in a rural constituency spanning the Camacho, Los Andes, and Manco Kapac provinces. He was not nominated for reelection.

== Early life and career ==
=== Early life and education ===
Lucio Huaycho was born on 11 December 1965 in Puerto Acosta, a rural agrarian settlement in Camacho Province, La Paz Department, inhabited primarily by Aymara highlanders. He was raised in a peasant household, the fifth of eight children born to trade unionist Luis Huaycho Calcina and merchant Juana Nina Apaza. In his youth, Huaycho balanced schooling with farm work and managed his mother's finances, as she had no formal education and did not speak Spanish. He often accompanied his father to union meetings, which developed his interest in leadership.

Through his brother, a teacher, Huaycho enrolled in the Warisata Normal School. He held student leadership positions from 1986, and served as executive secretary of the Confederation of Rural Normal School Students of Bolivia from 1990 to 1991. Huaycho went on to complete a two-year licentiate in academic administration from the Bolivian Catholic University in 2005 and took postgraduate courses in Cusco and Lima.

=== Career and trade unionism ===
Huaycho graduated as a primary school teacher and taught at a public school in Pacajes Province for two years. Later, he moved to Mocomoco in his home province and founded a school, becoming its principal. He taught in El Alto for a time but returned in 1997 after passing the principal's exam. He spent six months as an official in the Puerto Acosta mayor's office, where he helped establish new schools and regularize those lacking documentation. Following that, Huaycho resumed as principal of his own school.

Huaycho was district director of education in Mocomoco from 2004 to 2009 and president of the Association of District Directors of La Paz in 2009. He presided the teachers' union in Camacho Province from 2007 to 2008. In his role, Huaycho also organized cultural and sports events in his municipality. His leadership made him a known quantity among local communities. Teachers like Huaycho held high standing in rural areas, where low literacy rates and limited access to education afforded influence and prestige to university-educated individuals.

== Chamber of Deputies ==
=== Election ===
Bolivia's teachers' unions long leaned far left, and their perennial conflict with the state forged members like Huaycho into political leaders. During the Bolivian gas conflict in 2003, he took part in roadblocks in his home province and participated in the protest march to La Paz that forced the resignation of President Gonzalo Sánchez de Lozada.

The Movement Toward Socialism (MAS) cultivated strong ties with teachers' unions and sought to translate their leftist sympathies into electoral support. Huaycho's party membership and leadership experience led communities in his province to nominate him as their representative in parliament in 2009. He ran as the MAS candidate for the Chamber of Deputies in single-member constituency 17 of La Paz, encompassing the Camacho, Los Andes, and Manco Kapac provinces, and won by a commanding margin.

=== Tenure ===
Huaycho denounced Bolivia's education system as an "instrument of ongoing colonization" and argued that a new educational approach was needed to better integrate schools into their communities. Early in his term, he mustered support among La Paz educators and administrators for education reform legislation. Enacted in 2010, the reforms made intercultural bilingual education the norm and strengthened the role of community members in school administration. Huaycho was not nominated for reelection.

=== Commission assignments ===
- Government, Defense, and Armed Forces Commission
  - Defense, Armed Forces, Borders, and Civil Defense Committee (Secretary: 2010–2011; 2011–2013)
- Territorial Organization of the State and Autonomies Commission (President: 2013–2014)
- Planning, Economic Policy, and Finance Commission
  - Science and Technology Committee (2014–2015)

== Electoral history ==
Electoral history of Lucio Huaycho
Year	Office		Party	Votes			Result	Ref.
Year	Office		Party	Total	%	P.	Result	Ref.
2009	Deputies	C-17	Movement Toward Socialism	41,101	88.59	1st	Won	
Source: Plurinational Electoral Organ | Electoral Atlas

Chamber of Deputies of Bolivia
Preceded by Hilario Callisaya	Member of the Chamber of Deputies from La Paz's 17th constituency 2010–2015	Succeeded by Modesta Supo
