= Escoma Municipality =

Escoma
- Municipality
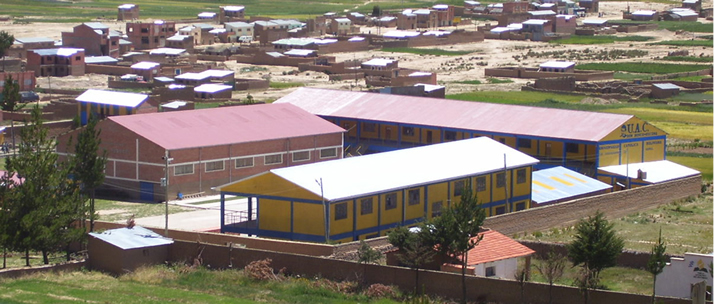
- UAC Escoma

- Location of the Umanata Municipality within Bolivia
- Coordinates: 15°37′0″S 69°9′0″W
- Country: Bolivia
- Department: La Paz Department
- Province: Eliodoro Camacho Province
- Foundation: February 6, 2009
- Seat: Escoma
- Elevation: 13,000 ft (4,000 m)

Population (2001)
  - Total: 7,077
- Time zone: UTC-4 (BOT)

Escoma Municipality is the fifth municipal section of the Eliodoro Camacho Province in the La Paz Department in Bolivia. It was created on February 6, 2009. Until then this area was part of the Viacha Municipality. Its seat is Escoma with 576 inhabitants in the year 2001.

Escoma Municipality is situated in the Altiplano on the western edge of the Cordillera Real. It is bordered to the north-east, north and west by the Puerto Acosta Municipality, to the south by Lake Titicaca, to the south-east by the Puerto Carabuco Municipality and to the east by the Mocomoco Municipality.

== Division ==
The municipality is divided into four cantons:

Canton	Inhabitants (2001)	Seat
Escoma Canton	5,097	Escoma
Challapata Peninsula Canton	905	Challapata
Collasuyo Canton	561	Collasuyo
Villa Puni Canton	514	Villa Puni

Formerly all these cantons which now make up the Escoma Municipality belonged to the Viacha Municipality.
