= Puerto Acosta Municipality =

- Municipality
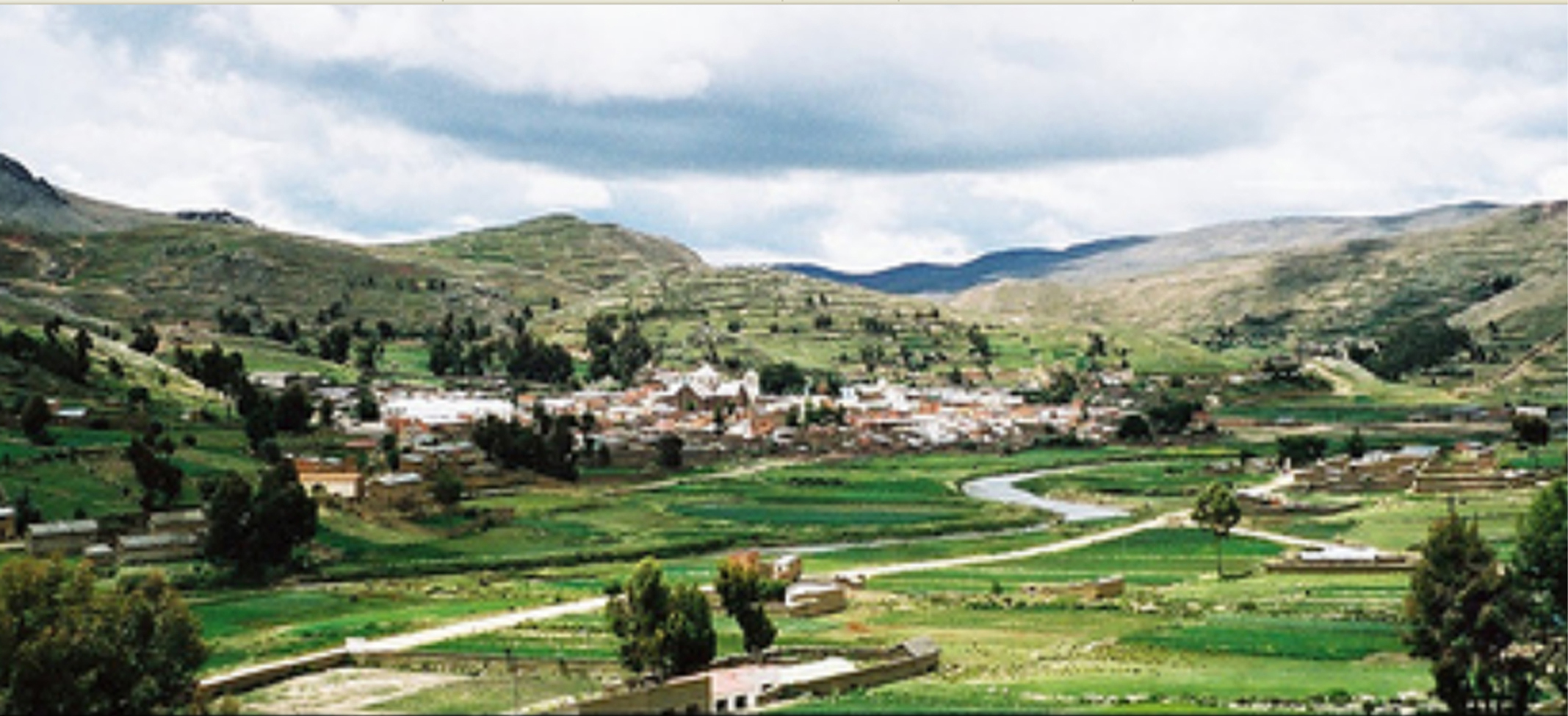
- Puerto Acosta (Huaycho)

- Location of the Puerto Acosta Municipality within Bolivia
- Coordinates: 15°30′0″S 69°10′0″W
- Country: Bolivia
- Department: La Paz Department
- Province: Eliodoro Camacho Province
- Seat: Puerto Acosta

Government
  - Mayor: Freddy Surco Toledo (2007)
  - President: Braulio Quispe Condori (2007)

Area
  - Total: 322 sq mi (833 km^{2})
- Elevation: 13,000 ft (4,000 m)

Population (2001)
  - Total: 27,296
- Time zone: UTC-4 (BOT)

Puerto Acosta Municipality is the first municipal section of the Eliodoro Camacho Province in the La Paz Department in Bolivia. Its seat is Puerto Acosta. At the time of census 2001 the municipality had a population of 27,296, still including Umanata and Escoma as cantons.

== Cantons ==
There are four cantons in the municipality: Puerto Acosta, Parajachi, Chiñaya and San Juan de Cancanani. Until 2009 the municipality consisted of nine cantons (cantones):

Canton	Inhabitants (2001)	Seat	Inhabitants (2001)
Puerto Acosta Canton	6,745	Puerto Acosta	1,123
Umanata Canton (now: Umanata Municipality)	6,447	Umanata	192
Escoma Canton (now in Escoma Municipality)	5,097	Escoma	576
Challapata Peninsula Canton (now in Escoma Municipality)	905	Challapata	-
Parajachi Canton or Puerto Parajachi Canton	2,245	Parajachi	-
Villa Puni Canton (now in Escoma Municipality)	514	Villa Puni	329
Collasuyo Canton (now in Escoma Municipality)	561	Collasuyo	22
Chiñaya Canton	3,296	Chiñaya	150
San Juan de Cancanani Canton	1,486	San Juan de Cancanani	172

On February 6, 2009 Umanata Municipality became the fourth municipal section of the Eliodoro Camacho Province with Umanata as its seat and Escoma Municipality became the fifth one with Escoma as its seat. The four cantons Escoma, Villa Puni, Collasuyo and Challapata Peninsula (Península de Challapata), formerly cantons of the Puerto Acosta Municipality, today make up the Escoma Municipality.
