= Umanata Municipality =

Umanata
- Municipality
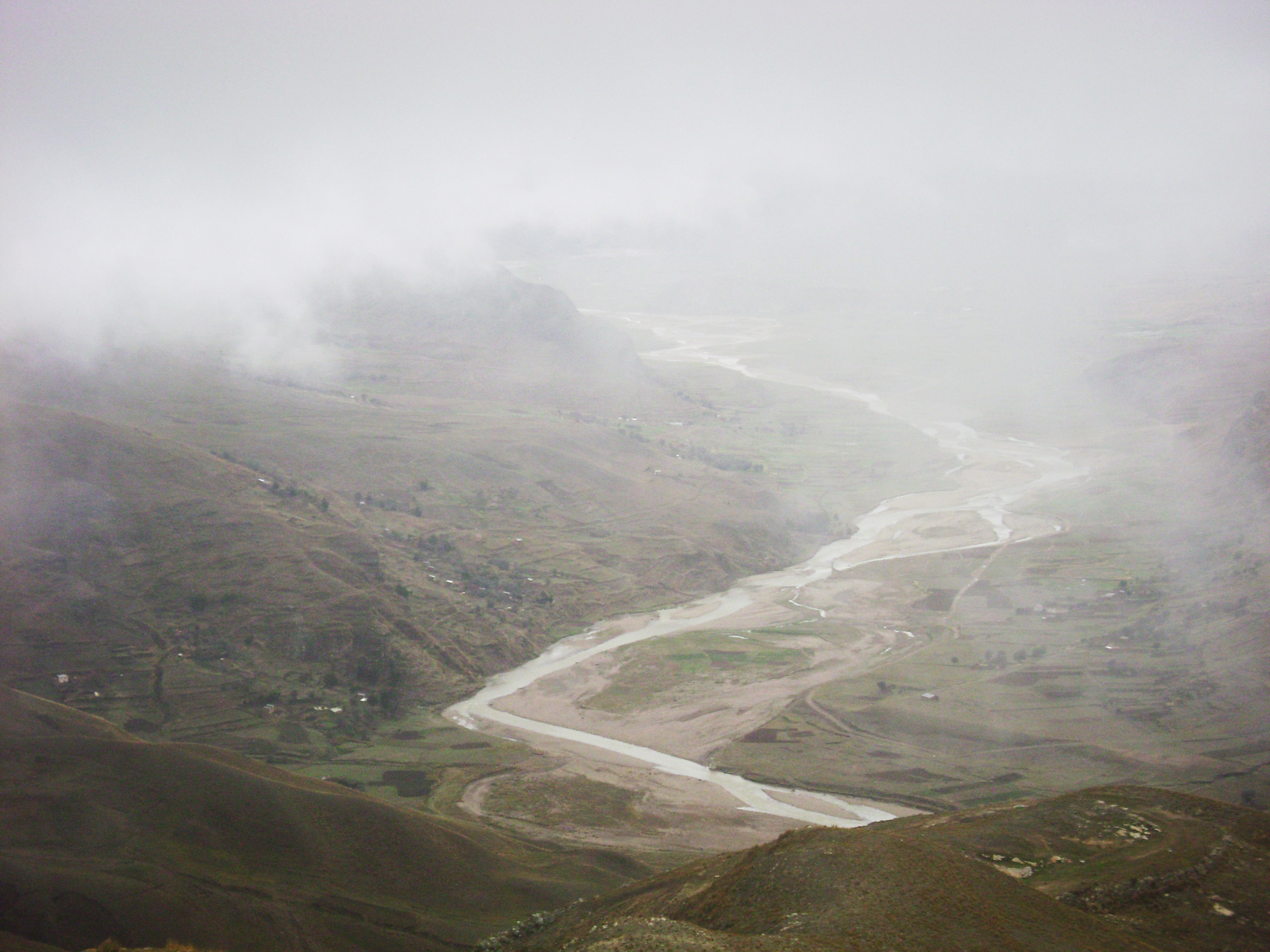
- Suches River, Umanata

- Location of the Umanata Municipality within Bolivia
- Coordinates: 15°24′0″S 69°11′0″W
- Country: Bolivia
- Department: La Paz Department
- Province: Eliodoro Camacho Province
- Foundation: February 6, 2009
- Seat: Umanata
- Elevation: 13,800 ft (4,200 m)

Population (2001)
  - Total: 6,447
- Time zone: UTC-4 (BOT)

Umanata Municipality (also Humanata) is the fourth municipal section of the Eliodoro Camacho Province in the La Paz Department in Bolivia. It was created on February 6, 2009. Until then it was one of the cantons of the Viacha Municipality. Its seat is Umanata (also Humanata) with 196 inhabitants in 2001.

Umanata Municipality is situated in the north-western part of the province. It is bordered to the northwest by Peru, to the east by the Mocomoco Municipality, to the south and southwest by the Puerto Acosta Municipality.

== See also ==
- Uma Jalsu
