= Quilima =

Coordinates: 15.8397°S 69.0025°W

- Town
- Interactive map of Quilima
- Country: Bolivia
- Department: La Paz Department (Bolivia)
- Province: Eliodoro Camacho Province
- Time zone: UTC-4 (BOT)

Quilima is a small town in Bolivia.
