= Villa Rosario de Wilacala =

Villa Rosario de Wilacala Wilaqala
- Village
- Location within Bolivia
- Coordinates: 15°21′S 69°3′W
- Country: Bolivia
- Department: La Paz Department
- Province: Eliodoro Camacho Province
- Municipality: Mocomoco Municipality
- Canton: Villa Rosario de Wila Khala Canton
- Elevation: 13,990 ft (4,264 m)

Population (2001)
  - Total: 303
  - Ethnicities: Aymara
- Time zone: UTC-4 (BOT)

Villa Rosario de Wilacala is a village in the La Paz Department in Bolivia. It is the seat of the Villa Rosario de Wila Khala Canton, one of the five cantons of the Mocomoco Municipality which is the second municipal section of the Eliodoro Camacho Province. The village is situated 4,264 m high at the north-western edge of the Muñecas Mountain Range (Cordillera Muñecas) near the border to Peru. At the time of census 2001 it had a population of 303.

Wilacala is the Hispanicized spelling of Aymara: Wilaqala, wila = blood or red, qala = stone, hard or quarry: So the name can mean "Red stone", "Blood stone" or "Red quarry".

The people in the Mocomoco Municipality are mainly Aymara (93.84%) and most citizens speak Aymara (92.68%) followed by Spanish (5.69%) and Quechua (1.25%) .

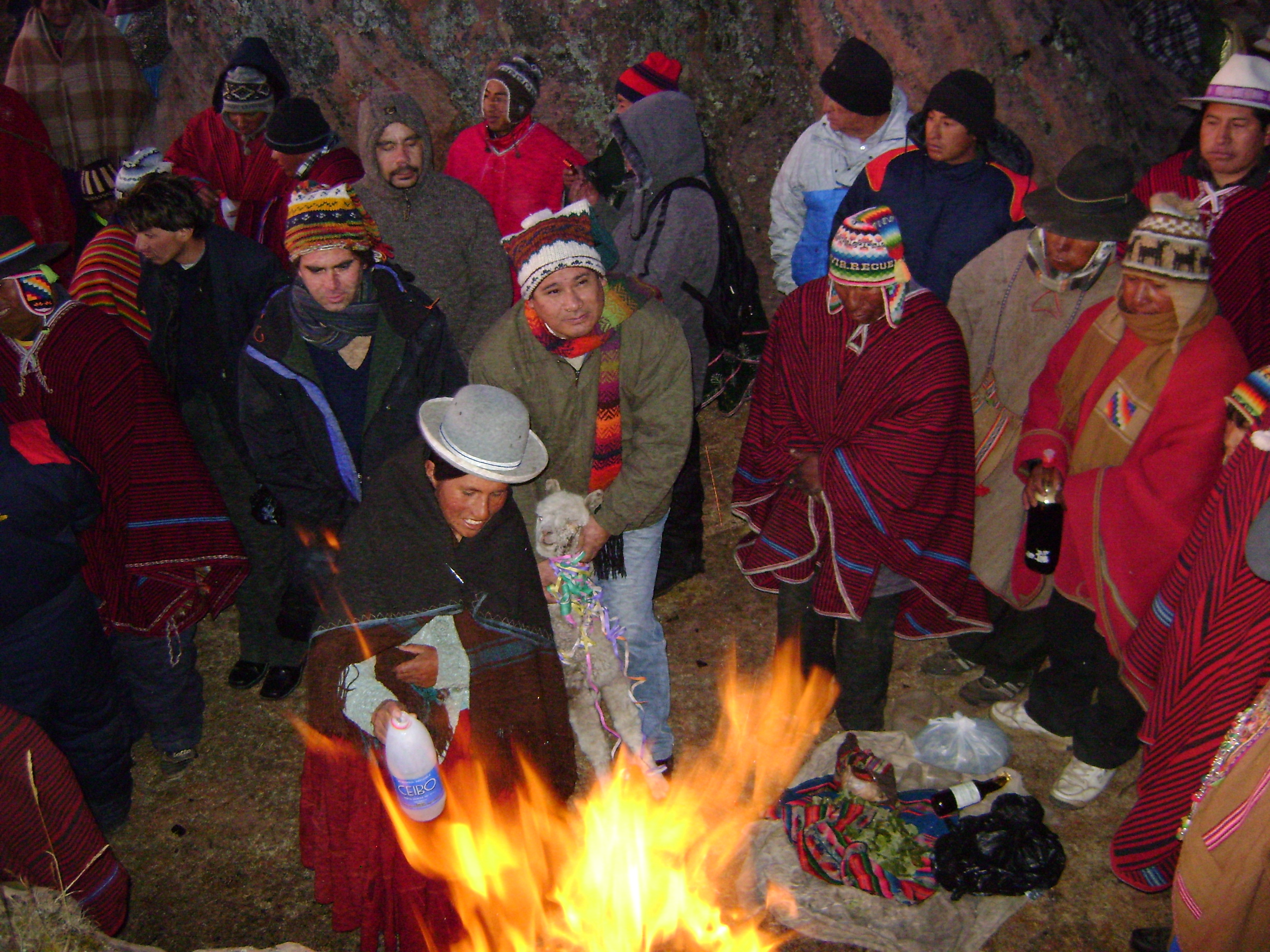
Sacrifice (Wilancha) in Wilaqala on the Aymara New Year (Willka Kuti) celebrated on June 21
