= Uma Jalsu =

Uma Jalsu (Aymara for spring, source, also spelled Huma Jalsu, Humajalso, Humajalsu, Uma Jalso, Umajalso, Umajalsu) may refer to:

- Uma Jalsu (Bolivia), a mountain in Bolivia
- Uma Jalsu (Moquegua), a mountain in the Moquegua Region, Peru
- Uma Jalsu (Puno), a mountain in the Puno Region, Peru
