= Willkakuti =

Aymara winter solstice celebration

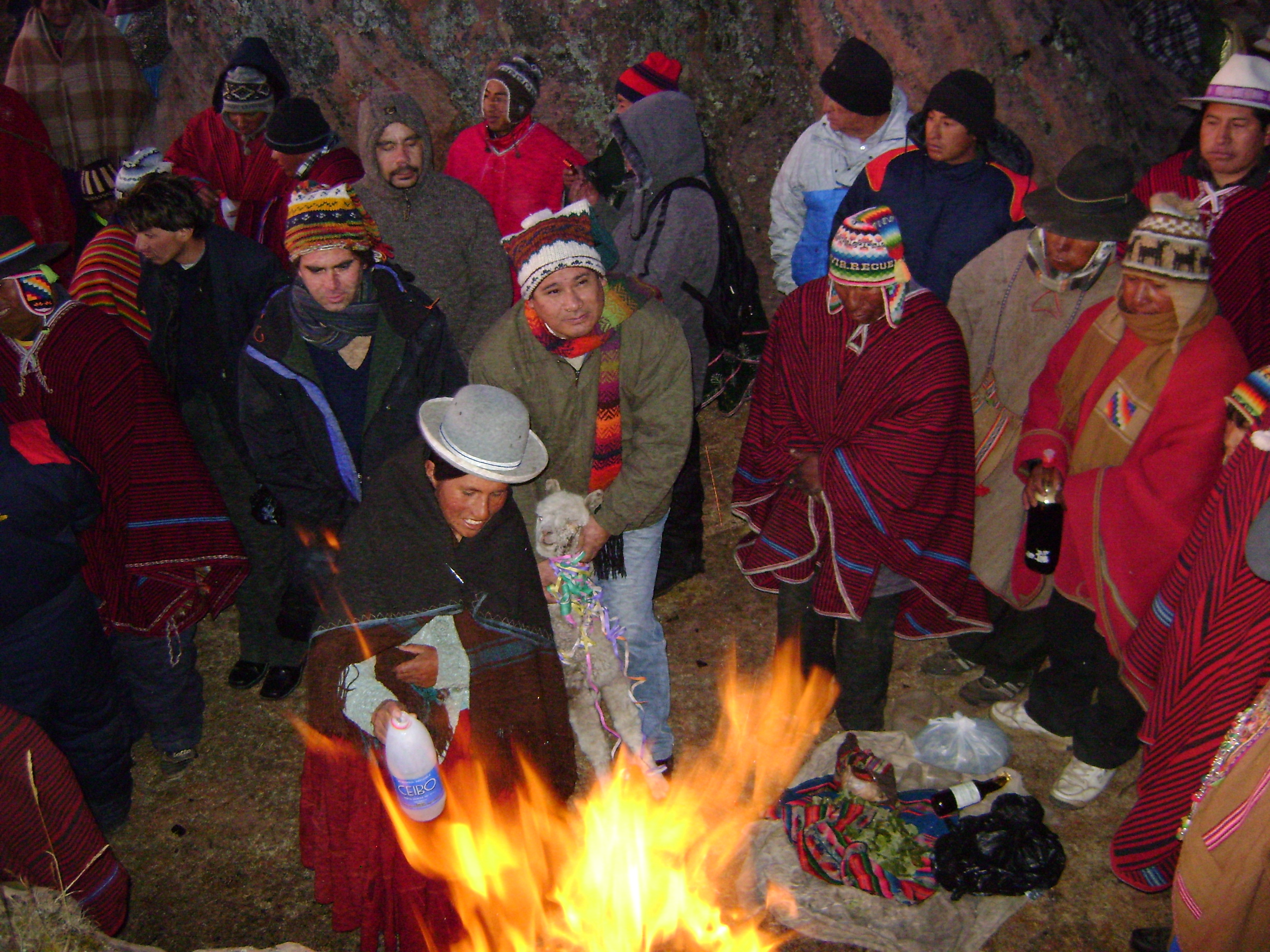
Wilancha (sacrifice) in Wilaqala on Willkakuti celebrated on June 21

Willkakuti (Aymara for Return of the Sun), Machaq Mara (Aymara for New Year), Mara T'aqa, Jach'a Laymi or Pacha Kuti (in Spanish named Año Nuevo Andino Amazónico (Andean-Amazonic New Year)) is an Aymara celebration in Bolivia, Chile and the Puno Region of Southern Peru which takes place annually on 21 June, commemorating the winter solstice in the Southern Hemisphere.

It was declared a national holiday in Bolivia in 2009 by the government of Evo Morales. In 2013, when the year 5521 of the Aymara calendar was marked, Willkakuti was celebrated in more than 200 places, among them Inkallaqta, Inka Raqay, Samaypata and Uyuni. Its major celebration hub is Tiwanaku.

== See also ==
- Inti Punku (Gate of the Sun)
- Indigenous peoples of the Americas
- Inti Raymi
- Tiwanaku
