= Inka Raqay, Bolivia =

Archaeological site in the Cochabamba Department, Bolivia

Inka Raqay
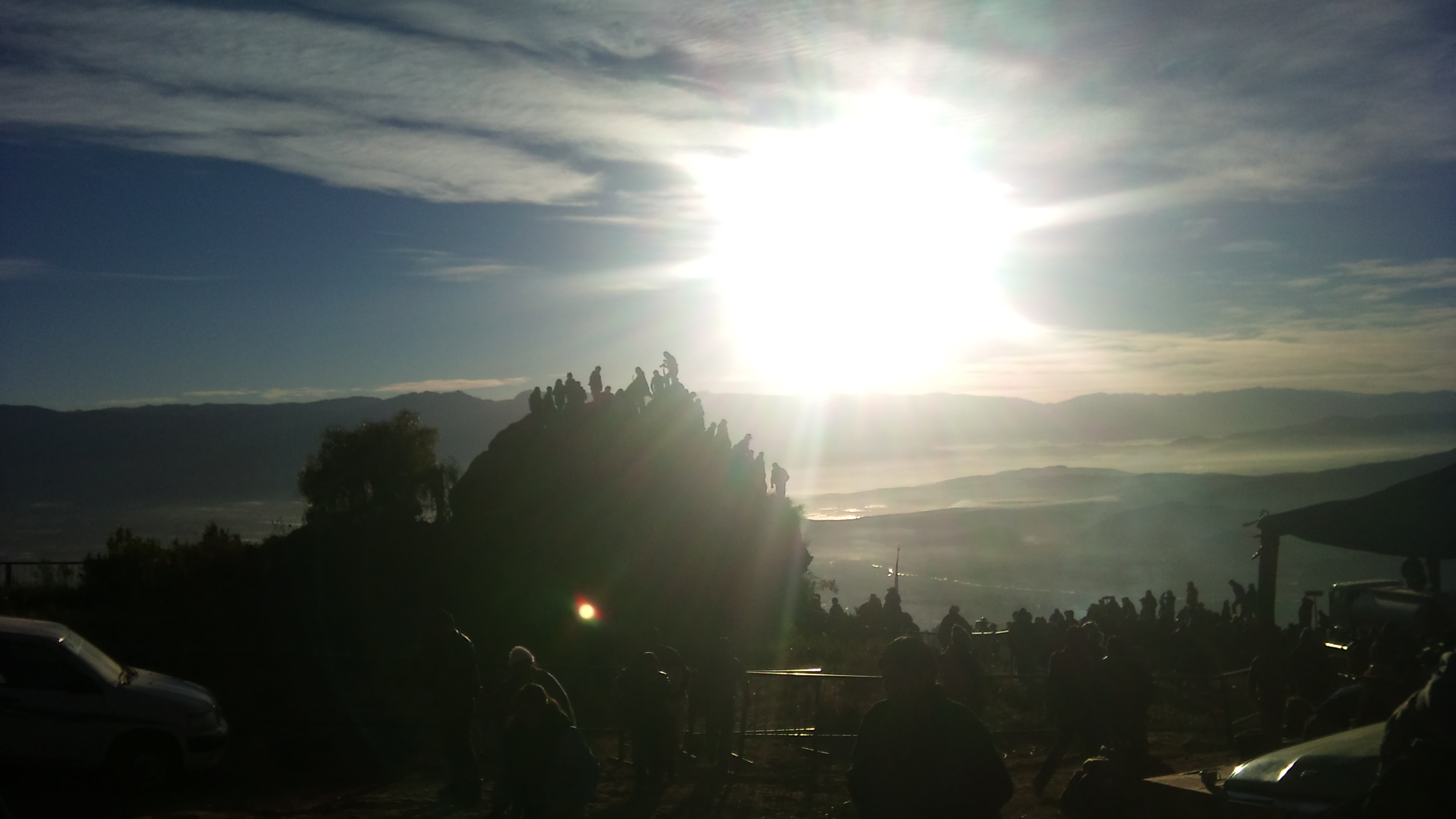
- Inka Raqay at sunrise during the Willkakuti ceremony in 2013
- Interactive map of Inka Raqay
- 17°28′44″S 66°23′6″W
- Location: Bolivia, Cochabamba Department, Quillacollo Province

Inka Raqay (Quechua Inka Inca, raqay ruin, a demolished building; shed, storehouse or dormitory for the laborers of a farm; a generally old building without roof, only with walls) is an archaeological site in Bolivia. It is located in the Cochabamba Department, Quillacollo Province, Sipe Sipe Municipality, near the community of Linku.

Inka Raqay was declared a National Archaeological Monument by Law No. 3479 of September 22, 2006. By Law No. 295 of September 28, 2012, it was declared a Historical and Cultural Heritage of the Bolivian state. It is one of the historical places where Willkakuti, the Andean-Amazonic New Year, is celebrated.
