= Uma Jalsu (Bolivia) =

Mountain in Bolivia

- Location within Bolivia

Highest point
- Elevation: 4,362 m (14,311 ft)
- Coordinates: 15°26′41″S 69°08′18″W

Geography
- Location: Bolivia, La Paz Department, Eliodoro Camacho Province
- Parent range: Andes

Uma Jalsu (Aymara for spring, source) is a 4,362-metre-high (14,311 ft) mountain in the Andes of Bolivia. It is located in the La Paz Department, Eliodoro Camacho Province, Umanata Municipality. Uma Jalsu lies on the right bank of the Suches River, northwest of Umanata.
