= Puerto Carabuco =

- Town
- Location within Bolivia
- Coordinates: 15°45′S 69°6′W
- Country: Bolivia
- Department: La Paz Department
- Province: Eliodoro Camacho Province
- Municipality: Puerto Carabuco Municipality

Population (2001)
  - Total: 416
  - Ethnicities: Aymara
- Time zone: UTC-4 (BOT)

Puerto Carabuco is a location in the La Paz Department in Bolivia.
