= Italaque =

Coordinates: 15°24′S 69°04′W

- Town
- Interactive map of Italaque
- Country: Bolivia
- Time zone: UTC-4 (BOT)

Italaque is a small town in Bolivia. The town had a population of 346 in 2012.
