= Escoma =

- Town
- Location within Bolivia
- Coordinates: 15°40′S 69°8′W
- Country: Bolivia
- Department: La Paz Department
- Province: Eliodoro Camacho Province
- Municipality: Escoma Municipality

Population (2001)
  - Total: 576
  - Ethnicities: Aymara
- Time zone: UTC-4 (BOT)
- Climate: Cwb

Escoma is a location in the La Paz Department in Bolivia. It is the seat of the Escoma Municipality, one of five municipalities of the Eliodoro Camacho Province. In 2009 Escoma had an estimated population of 712.
