= Mocomoco =

Mocomoco Muqu Muqu
- Town
- Location within Bolivia
- Coordinates: 15°22′S 68°59′W
- Country: Bolivia
- Department: La Paz Department
- Province: Eliodoro Camacho Province
- Municipality: Mocomoco Municipality

Population (2001)
  - Total: 444
  - Ethnicities: Aymara
- Time zone: UTC-4 (BOT)

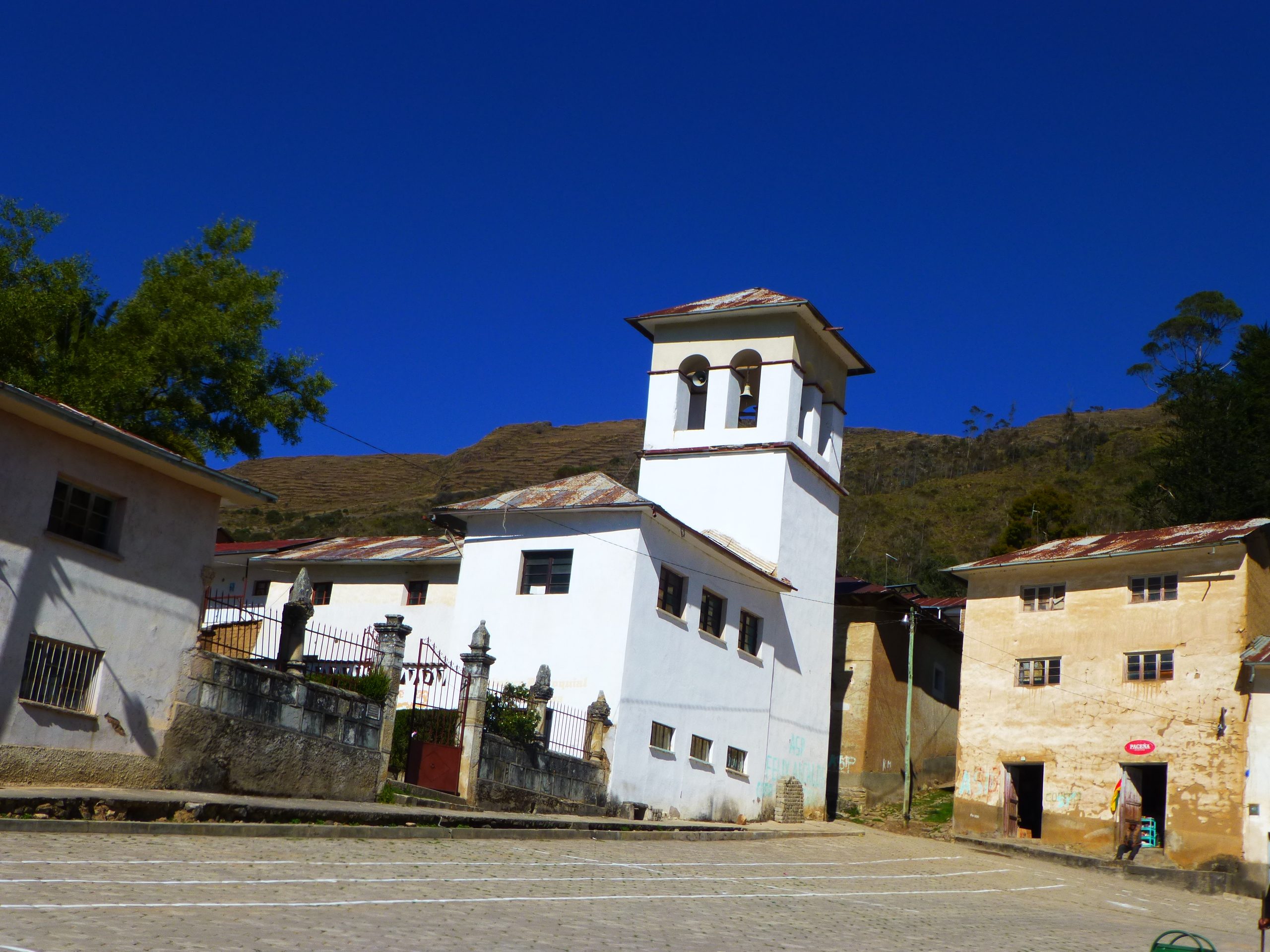
Moco Moco's main square, Bolivia

Mocomoco or Muqu Muqu (Aymara) is a location in the La Paz Department in Bolivia. It is the seat of the Mocomoco Municipality in the Eliodoro Camacho Province.
