= Puerto Carabuco Municipality =

- Municipality
- Location of the Puerto Carabuco Municipality within Bolivia
- Coordinates: 15°35′0″S 69°0′0″W
- Country: Bolivia
- Department: La Paz Department
- Province: Eliodoro Camacho Province
- Seat: Puerto Carabuco

Government
  - Mayor: Rene Corino Palli (2007)
  - President: Zenon Huanca Nina (2007)

Area
  - Total: 158 sq mi (408 km^{2})
- Elevation: 12,800 ft (3,900 m)

Population (2001)
  - Total: 16,499
- Time zone: UTC-4 (BOT)

Puerto Carabuco Municipality is the third municipal section of the Eliodoro Camacho Province in the La Paz Department, Bolivia. Its seat is Puerto Carabuco.

== Division ==
The municipality is subdivided into four cantons:

- Ambana Canton - 7,526 inhabitants (2001)
- Puerto Carabuco Canton - 2,202 inhabitants (2001)
- Chaguaya Canton - 5,278 inhabitants (2001)
- San Miguel de Yaricoa Canton - 1,493 inhabitants (2001)
