= Puerto Acosta =

Puerto Acosta Waychu
- Town
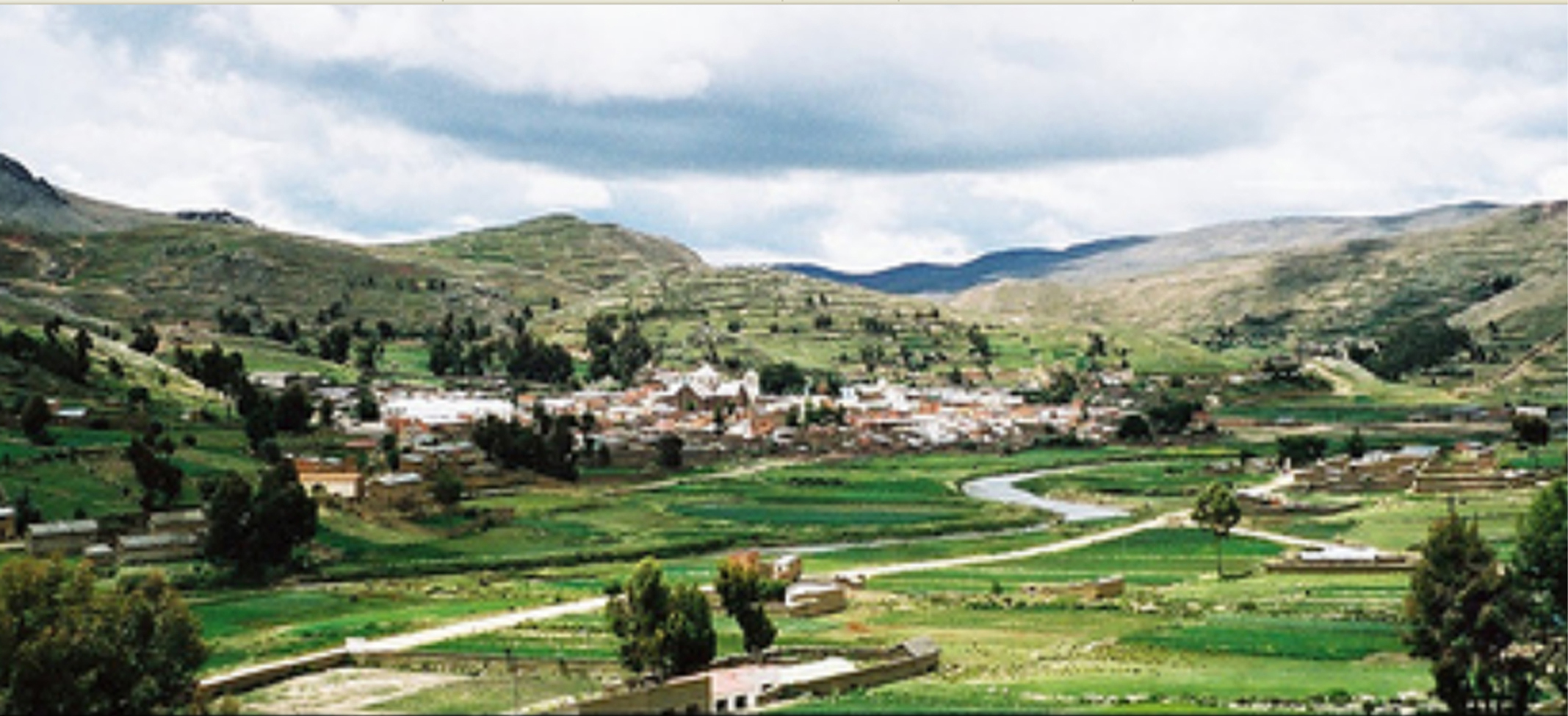
- Interactive map of Puerto Acosta
- Coordinates: 15°32′00″S 69°15′09″W
- Country: Bolivia
- Department: La Paz Department
- Province: Eliodoro Camacho Province
- Municipality: Puerto Acosta Municipality

Government
  - Mayor: Freddy Surco Toledo (2007)
  - President: Braulio Quispe Condori (2007)

Population (2001)
  - Total: 1,123
  - Ethnicities: Aymara
- Time zone: UTC-4 (BOT)
- Climate: Cwc

Puerto Acosta or Waychu (Aymara) is a town in the La Paz Department, Bolivia.

== Climate ==
Climate data for Puerto Acosta, elevation 3,880 m (12,730 ft)
Month	Jan	Feb	Mar	Apr	May	Jun	Jul	Aug	Sep	Oct	Nov	Dec	Year
Mean daily maximum °C (°F)	15.0 (59.0)	15.2 (59.4)	14.9 (58.8)	15.1 (59.2)	15.2 (59.4)	14.6 (58.3)	14.6 (58.3)	15.4 (59.7)	15.4 (59.7)	15.7 (60.3)	15.8 (60.4)	15.8 (60.4)	15.2 (59.4)
Daily mean °C (°F)	9.6 (49.3)	9.6 (49.3)	9.2 (48.6)	9.0 (48.2)	7.9 (46.2)	6.9 (44.4)	6.8 (44.2)	7.8 (46.0)	8.6 (47.5)	9.4 (48.9)	9.6 (49.3)	10.0 (50.0)	8.7 (47.7)
Mean daily minimum °C (°F)	4.2 (39.6)	4.0 (39.2)	3.5 (38.3)	2.9 (37.2)	0.7 (33.3)	−1.0 (30.2)	−1.1 (30.0)	0.2 (32.4)	1.8 (35.2)	3.1 (37.6)	3.5 (38.3)	4.3 (39.7)	2.2 (35.9)
Average precipitation mm (inches)	140.3 (5.52)	100.1 (3.94)	71.4 (2.81)	42.3 (1.67)	17.6 (0.69)	14.8 (0.58)	6.9 (0.27)	16.8 (0.66)	35.1 (1.38)	50.4 (1.98)	57.0 (2.24)	96.4 (3.80)	649.1 (25.54)
Average precipitation days	12.6	9.7	8.3	5.0	2.6	1.9	1.4	2.6	4.6	6.2	6.7	10.0	71.6
Source: Servicio Nacional de Meteorología e Hidrología de Bolivia
