= Umanata =

- Village
- Location within Bolivia
- Coordinates: 15°28′00″S 69°8′00″W
- Country: Bolivia
- Department: La Paz Department
- Province: Eliodoro Camacho Province
- Municipality: Umanata Municipality
- Elevation: 3,942 m (12,933 ft)

Population (2012)
  - Total: 426
- Time zone: UTC-4 (BOT)

Umanata is a village and the municipal seat of Umanata Municipality, the fourth municipal section of the Eliodoro Camacho Province in the La Paz Department in Bolivia.
