= Mocomoco Municipality =

Mocomoco Muqu Muqu
- Municipality
- Location of the Mocomoco Municipality within Bolivia
- Coordinates: 15°25′0″S 69°5′0″W
- Country: Bolivia
- Department: La Paz Department
- Province: Eliodoro Camacho Province
- Seat: Mocomoco (Muqu Muqu)

Government
  - Mayor: Pascual Maximo Kuno Condori (2007)
  - President: Felix Calle Tintaya (2007)

Area
  - Total: 202 sq mi (523 km^{2})
- Elevation: 11,500 ft (3,500 m)

Population (2001)
  - Total: 13,950
- Time zone: UTC-4 (BOT)

Mocomoco or Muqu Muqu (Aymara) is one of five municipalities of the Eliodoro Camacho Province in the La Paz Department in Bolivia. Its seat is Mocomoco (Muqu Muqu).

== Division ==
The municipality is divided into five cantons:

Canton	Inhabitants (2001)	Seat
Italaque Canton	1,320	Italaque
Mocomoco Canton (Muqu Muqu)	3,742	Mocomoco (Muqu Muqu)
Pacaures Canton (Pakawri)	3,421	Pacaures (Pakawri)
Tajani Canton	1,653	Tajani
Villa Rosario de Wila Khala Canton	3,881	Wilacala
