= Eliodoro Camacho Province =

Eliodoro Camacho
- Province
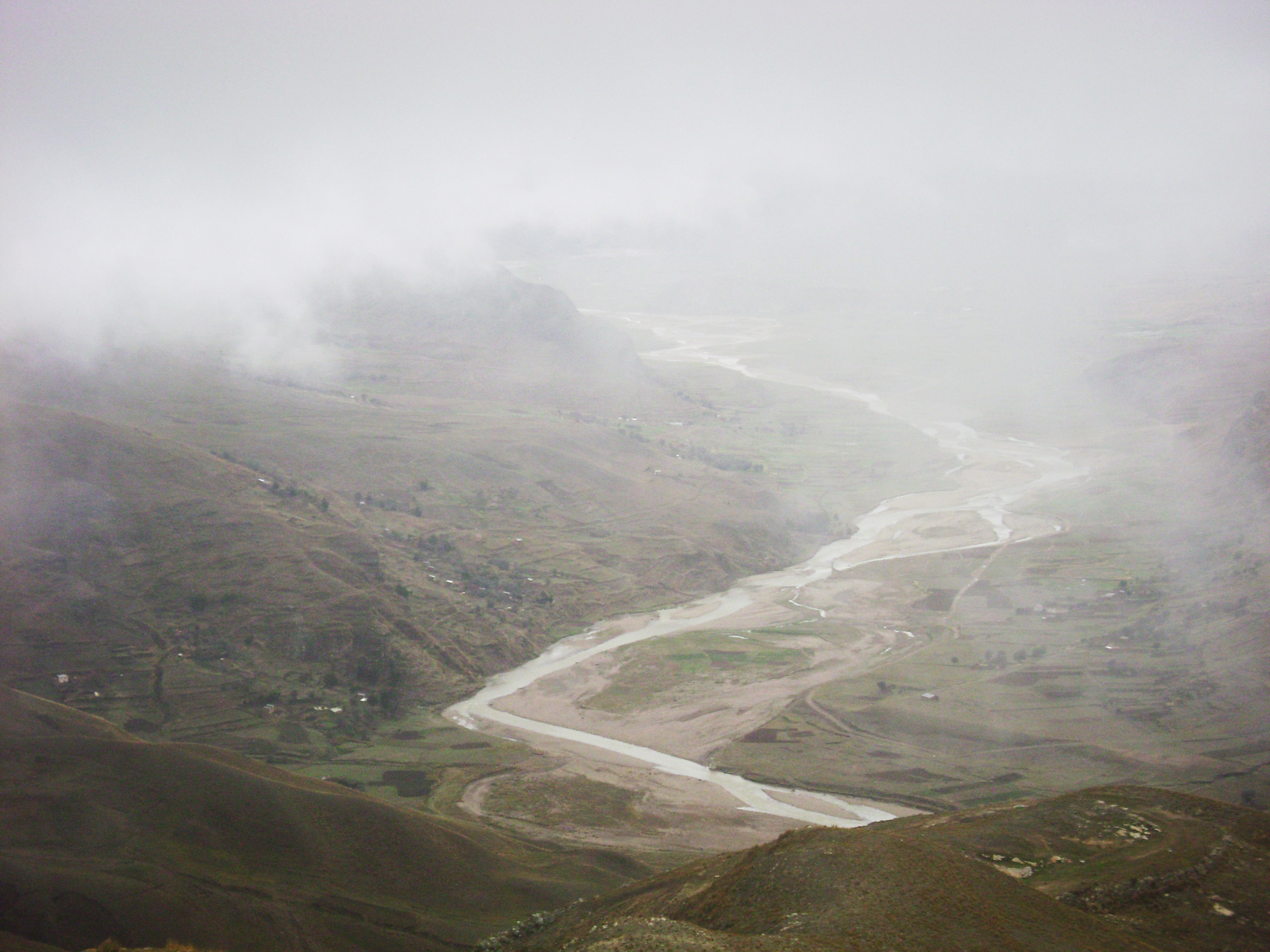
- Suches River in Umanata

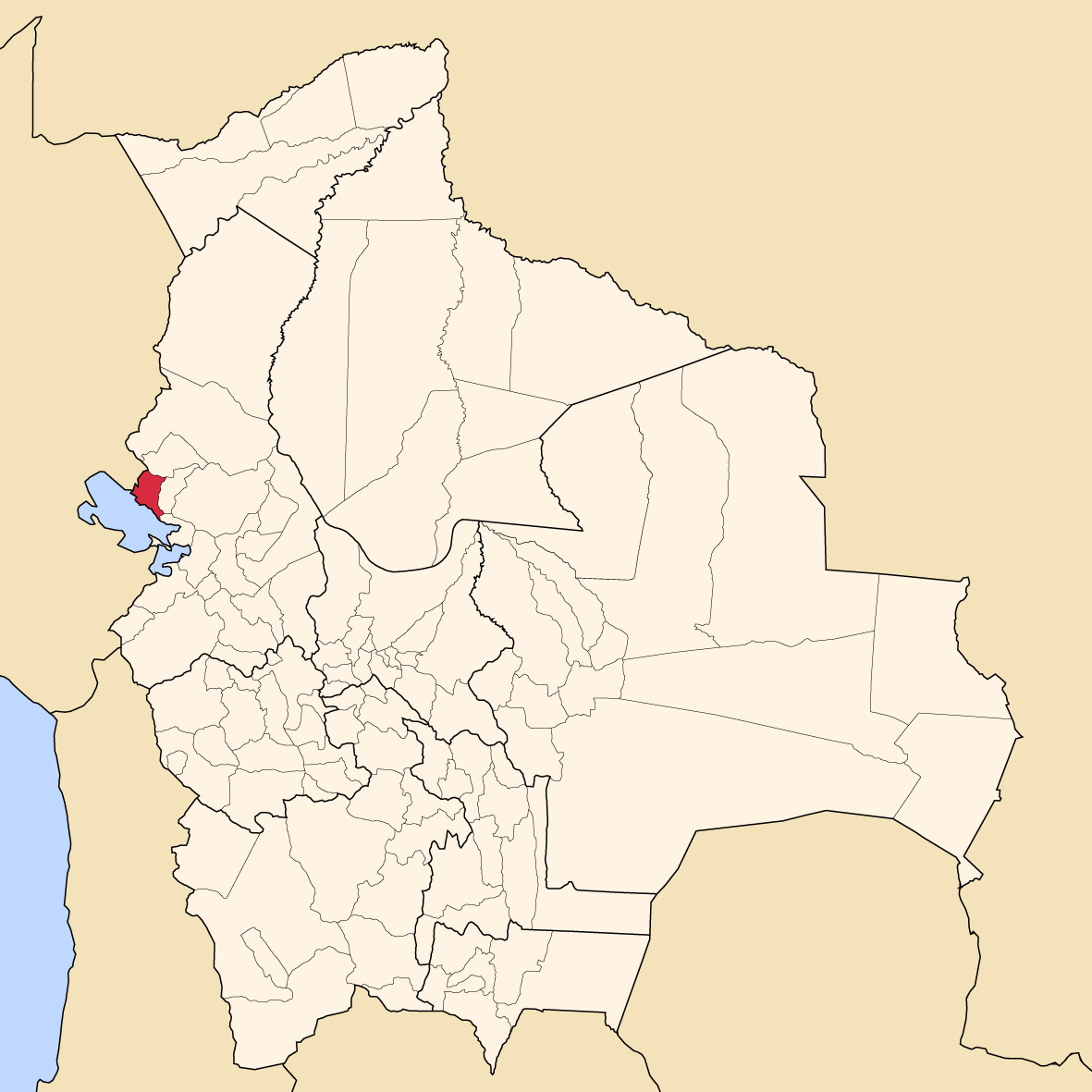
- Location of Eliodoro Camacho Province within Bolivia

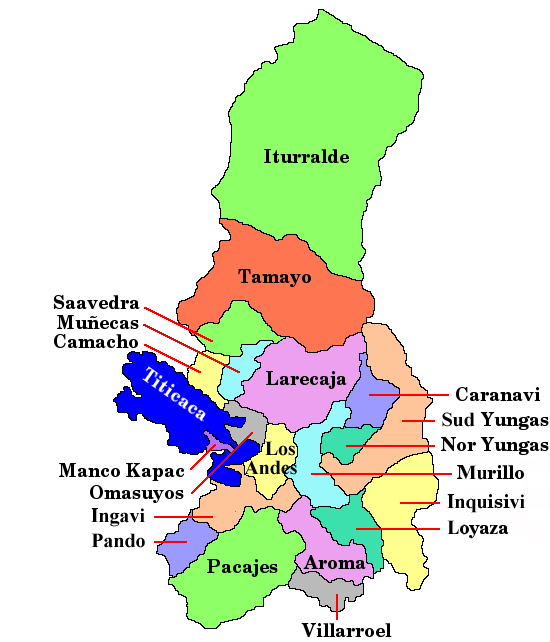
- Provinces of the La Paz Department
- Coordinates: 15°30′0″S 69°5′0″W
- Country: Bolivia
- Department: La Paz Department
- Municipalities: 5
- Foundation: November 5, 1908
- Capital: Puerto Acosta

Area
  - Total: 2,080 km^{2} (800 sq mi)

Population (2024 census)
  - Total: 63,266
  - Density: 30.4/km^{2} (78.8/sq mi)
  - Ethnicities: Aymara
- Time zone: UTC-4 (BOT)
- Website: Official website

Eliodoro Camacho is a province in the La Paz Department in Bolivia situated at Lake Titicaca. Its seat is Puerto Acosta.

Camacho Province is situated in the western region of the La Paz Department bordered to the north by the Muñecas Province, to the east by the Larecaja Province, to the south by the Omasuyos Province, to the west by Lake Titicaca and Moho Province located in the Puno Region of Peru.

Camacho Province was created during the presidency of General Ismael Montes on November 5, 1908, named after the Bolivian politician and officer Eliodoro Camacho. Originally it was composed of the cantons Huaycho, Escoma, Carabuco, Italaque, Mocomoco and Ambaná. Huaycho became the capital of the province under the name "Puerto Acosta" (meaning: "Port Acosta") in honor of the writer Nicolás Acosta (1844 - 1893).

== Subdivision ==
The province is divided into five municipalities which are further subdivided into cantons.

Section	Municipality	Seat	Inhabitants (2001)
1st	Puerto Acosta Municipality	Puerto Acosta	1,123
2nd	Mocomoco Municipality	Mocomoco	444
3rd	Puerto Carabuco Municipality	Puerto Carabuco	416
4th	Umanata Municipality (also Humanata Municipality)	Umanata (also Humanata)	192
5th	Escoma Municipality	Escoma	576

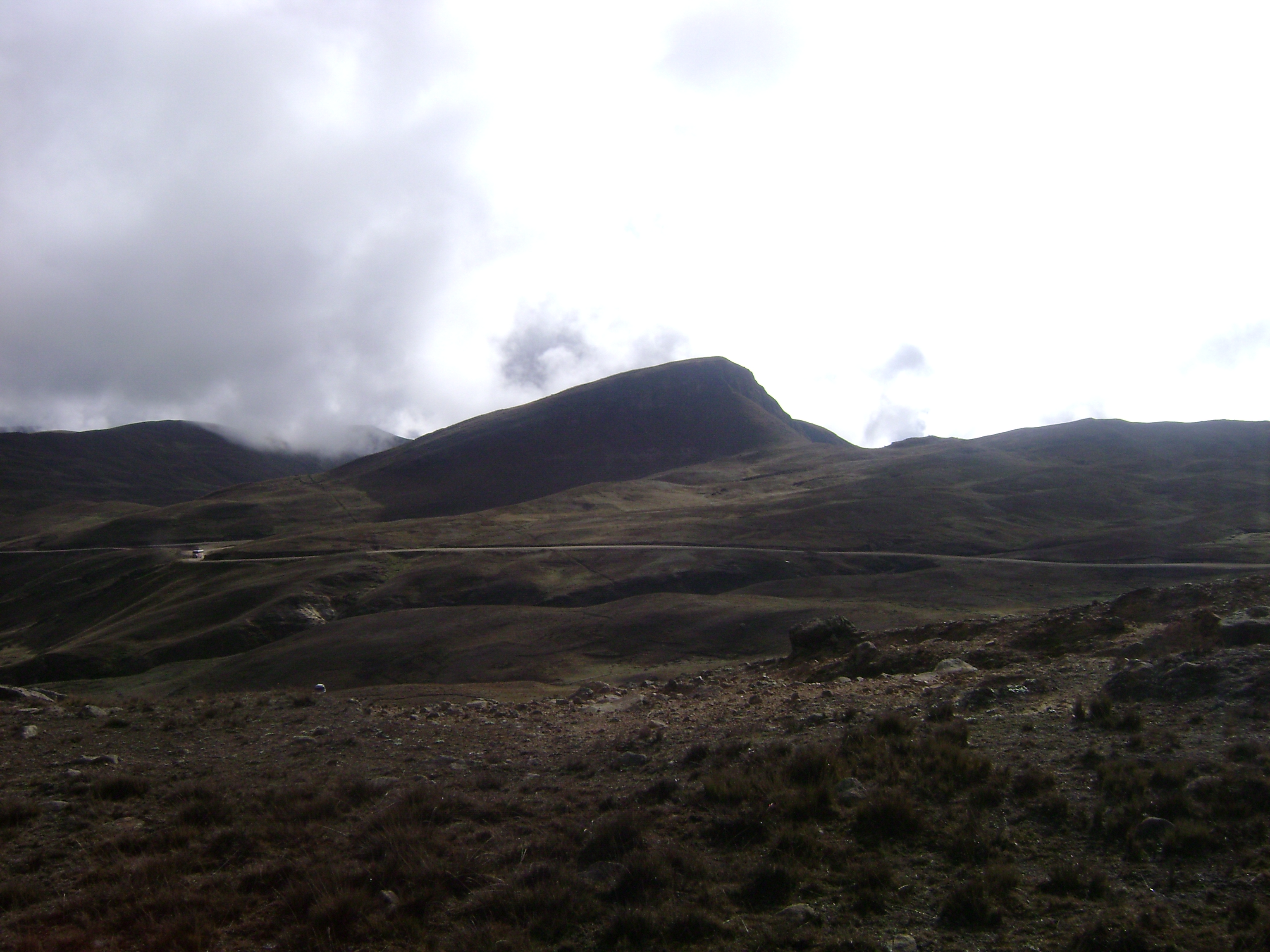

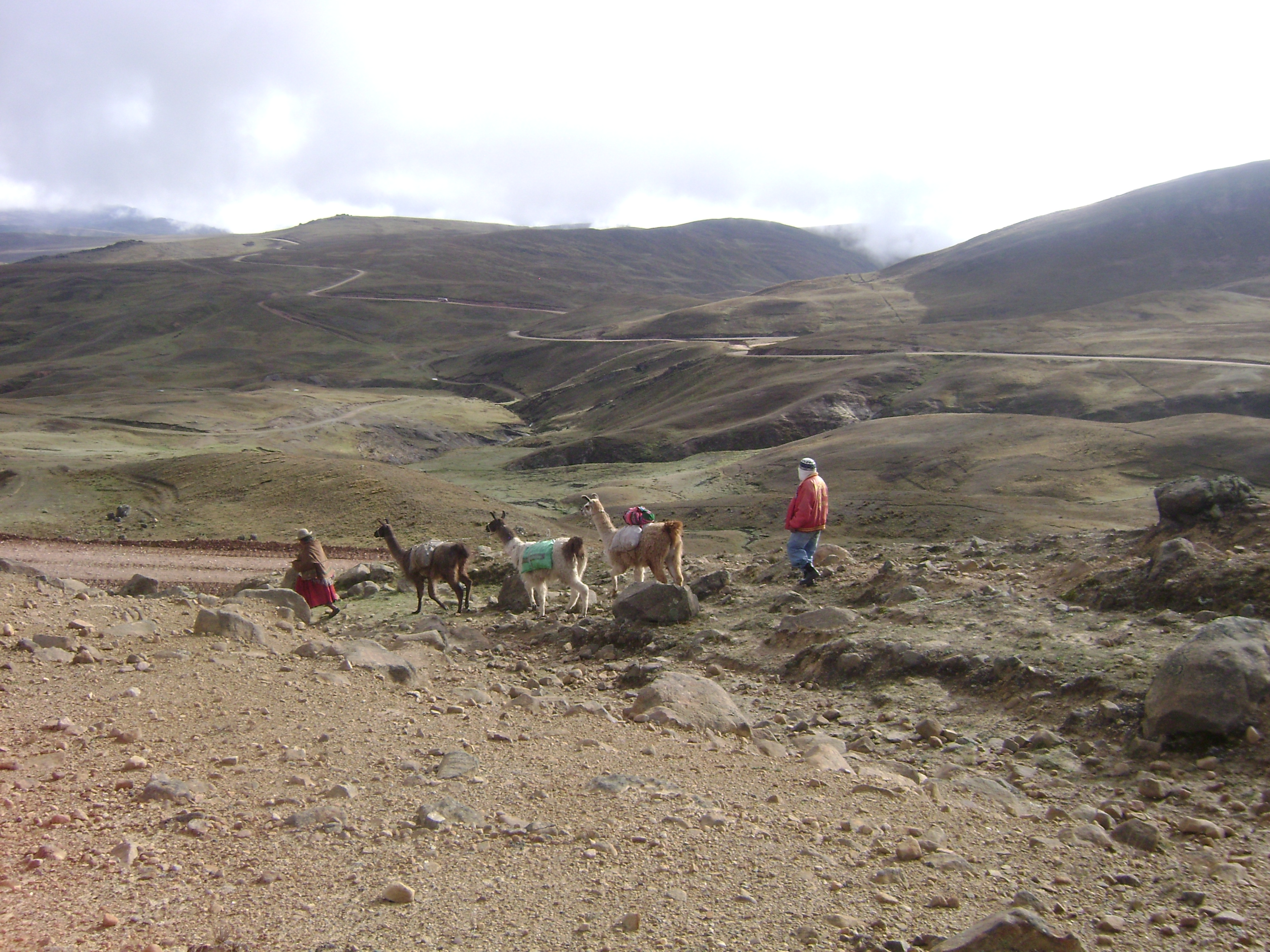
Transport in Eliodoro Camacho Province

== See also ==
- Qachu Quta
- Uma Jalsu
