= Suches River =

River in La Paz Department, Bolivia

Coordinates: 15.6939°S 69.1561°W

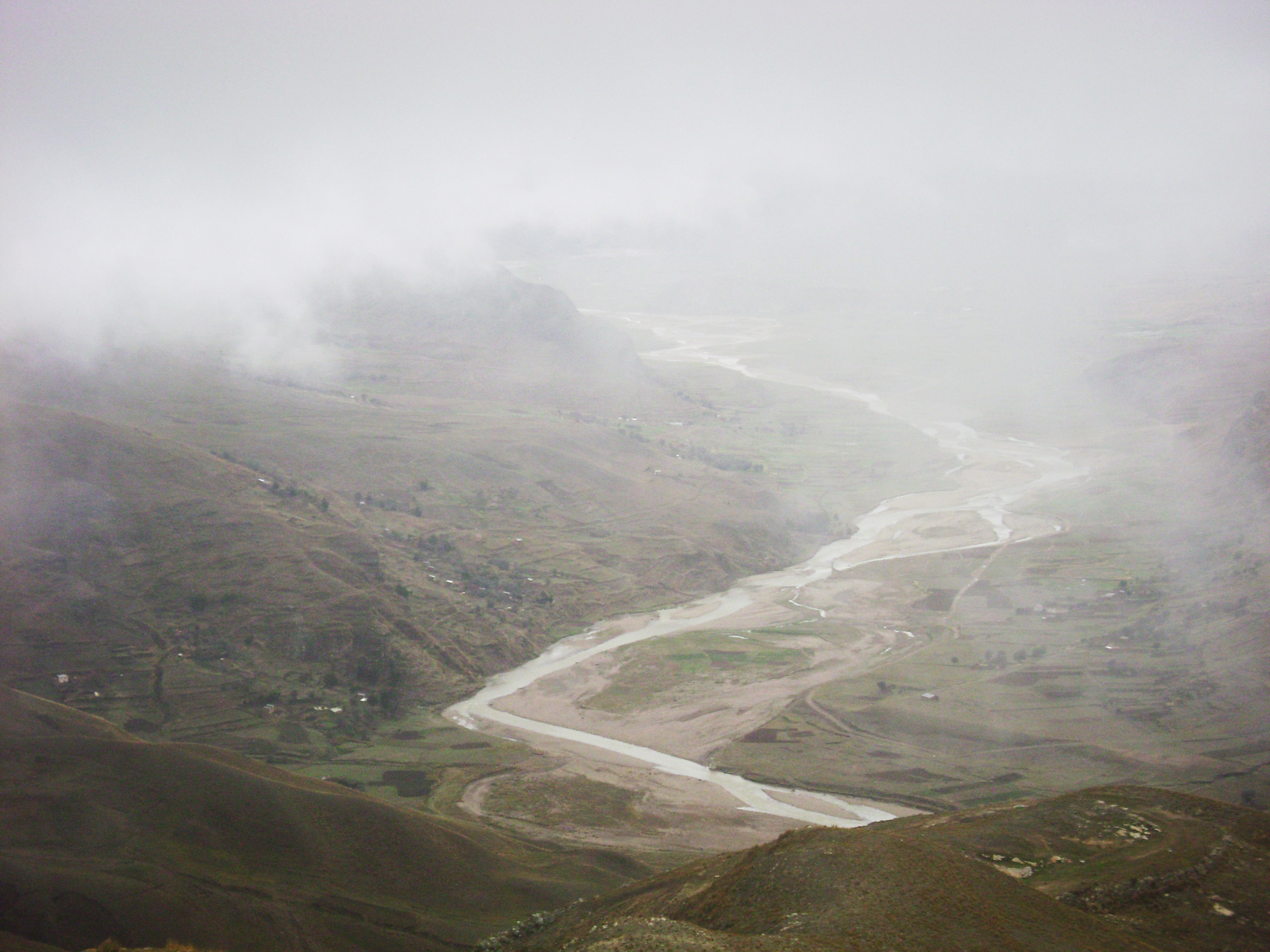

Location
- Country: Bolivia

Physical characteristics
- Source
  - location: Suches Lake
  - elevation: 4605 m
- Mouth
  - location: Lake Titicaca
  - elevation: 3810 m
- Length: 174 km

The Suches River is a river of Bolivia, running from the Suches Lake to Lake Titicaca. It forms a stretch of the Bolivia-Peru border.

== Course ==
The Suches River rises in Suches Lake at 4,605 meters above sea level. It then follows the length of the Bolivian-Peruvian border for 95 km before flowing for another 79 km within Bolivian territory, before flowing into Lake Titicaca at 3,800 metres (12,500 ft).

The river's elevation remains above 3,800 metres (12,500 ft) for its entire course, meaning water temperatures stay consistently cold throughout the year.

== See also ==
- List of rivers of Bolivia
