= Ivirgarzama =

- Town
- Location within Bolivia
- Coordinates: 17°2′S 64°51′W
- Country: Bolivia
- Department: Cochabamba Department
- Province: Carrasco Province
- Municipality: Puerto Villarroel Municipality
- Canton: Ivirgarzama Canton

Population (2001)
  - Total: 6,366
- Time zone: UTC-4 (BOT)

Ivirgarzama is a small town in Bolivia.

== See also ==
- Inkallaqta
- Carrasco National Park
