= Chillicchi Canton =

- Canton
- Country: Bolivia
- Department: Cochabamba Department
- Province: Carrasco Province
- Municipality: Pocona Municipality
- Seat: Chillicchi

Population (2001)
  - Total: 405

Chillicchi Canton is one of the cantons of the Pocona Municipality, the third municipal section of the Carrasco Province in the Cochabamba Department in central Bolivia. Its seat is the village of Chillicchi; as of 2001, Chillicchi had 130 inhabitants.

== See also ==
- Carrasco National Park
- Inkallaqta
