= Huayapacha Canton =

Huayapacha Canton Wayapacha
- Canton
- Location of Huayapacha within Bolivia
- Coordinates: 17°29′0″S 65°28′0″W
- Country: Bolivia
- Department: Cochabamba Department
- Province: Carrasco Province
- Municipality: Pocona Municipality
- Seat: Huayapacha

Population (2001)
  - Total: 5,461

Huayapacha Canton (Quechua: Wayapacha) is one of the cantons of the Pocona Municipality, the third municipal section of the Carrasco Province in the Cochabamba Department in central Bolivia. Its seat is Huayapacha (206 inhabitants, census 2001).

== See also ==
- Carrasco National Park
- Inkallaqta
