= Chimboata Canton =

Chimboata Canton Chimpuwata
- Canton
- Location of Conda within Bolivia
- Coordinates: 17°37′0″S 65°17′0″W
- Country: Bolivia
- Department: Cochabamba Department
- Province: Carrasco Province
- Municipality: Pocona Municipality
- Seat: Chimboata

Population (2001)
  - Total: 963

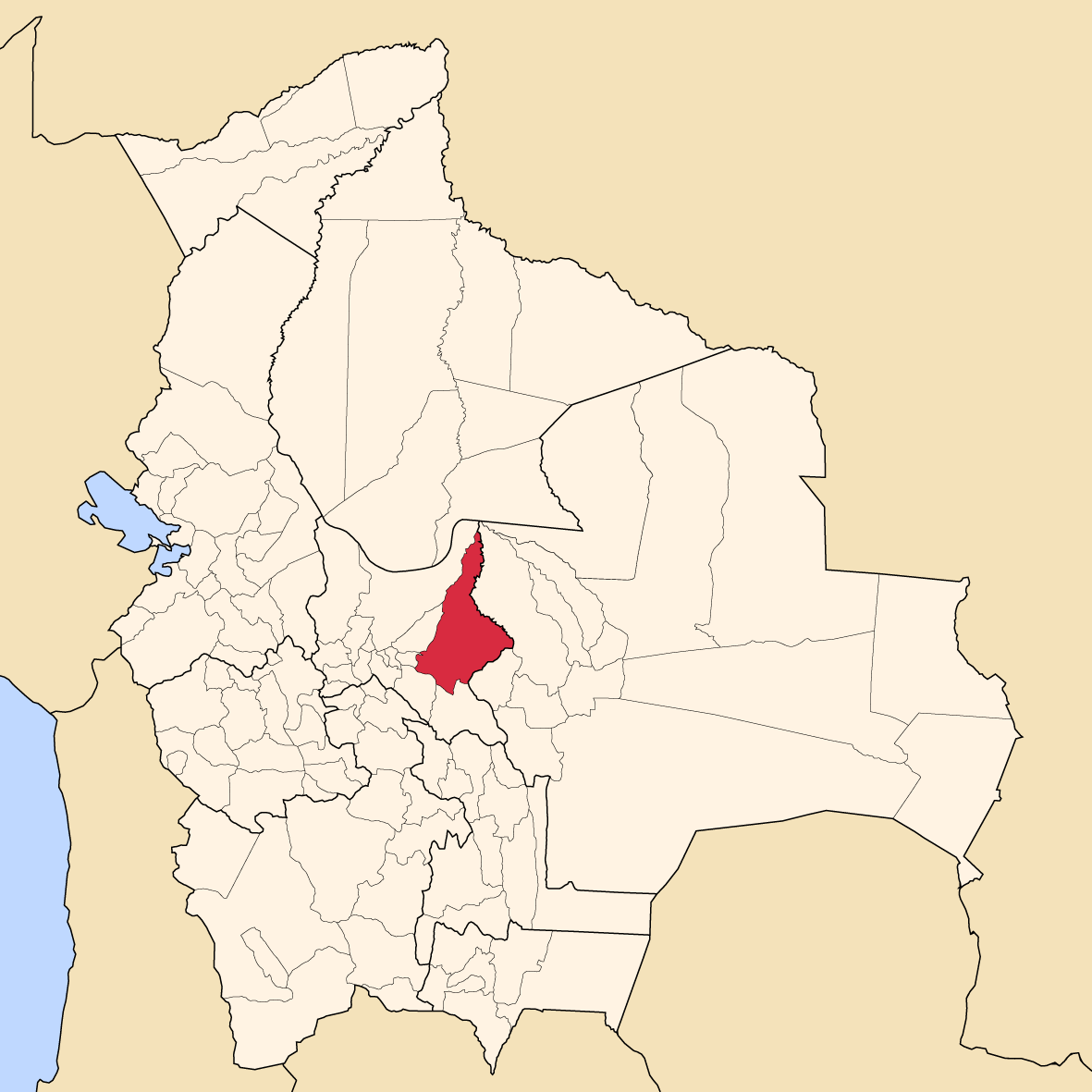
Map of Bolivia showing Carrasco province

Chimboata Canton (Quechua: Chimpuwata) is one of the cantons of the Pocona Municipality, the third municipal section of the Carrasco Province in the Cochabamba Department in central Bolivia. Its seat is Chimboata (69 inhabitants, census 2001).

== See also ==
- Carrasco National Park
- Inkallaqta
