= Conda Canton =

- Canton
- Location of Conda within Bolivia
- Coordinates: 17°41′0″S 65°21′0″W
- Country: Bolivia
- Department: Cochabamba Department
- Province: Carrasco Province
- Municipality: Pocona Municipality
- Seat: Conda

Population (2001)
  - Total: 2,408

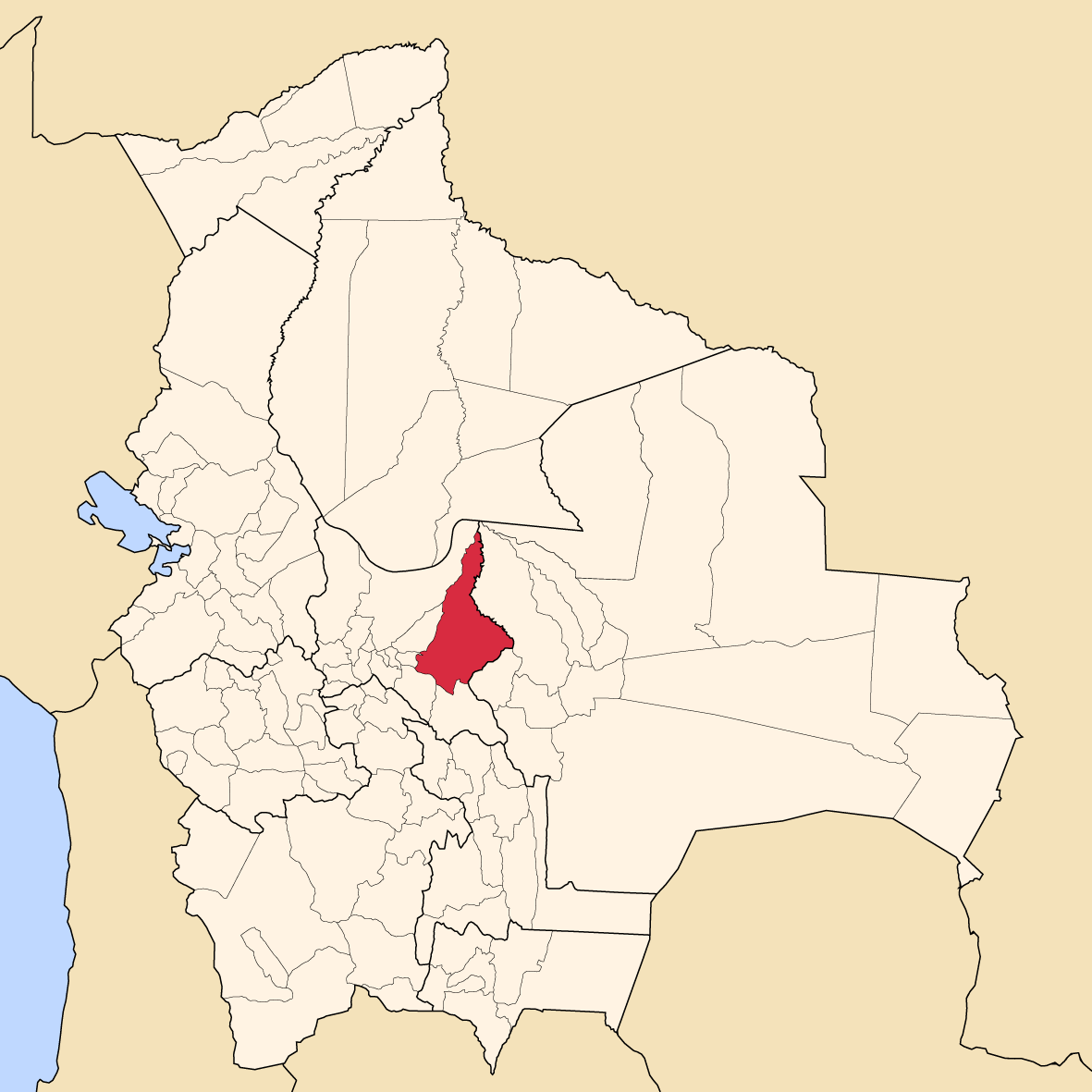

Conda Canton is one of the cantons of the Pocona Municipality, the third municipal section of the Carrasco Province in the Cochabamba Department in central Bolivia. Its seat is Conda (311 inhabitants, census 2001).

== See also ==
- Carrasco National Park
- Inkallaqta
