= Rumi Rumiyuq =

Mountain in Bolivia

- Location within Bolivia

Highest point
- Elevation: 4,160 m (13,650 ft)
- Coordinates: 17°32′50″S 65°30′40″W

Geography
- Location: Bolivia, Cochabamba Department
- Parent range: Andes

Rumi Rumiyuq (Quechua rumi stone, the reduplication indicates that there is a complex of something, -yuq a suffix, "the one with many stones", also spelled Rumi Rumiyoj, erroneously also Rumi Rumiroj) is a mountain in the Bolivian Andes which reaches a height of approximately 4,160 m (13,650 ft). It is located in the Cochabamba Department, Carrasco Province, Pocona Municipality. Rumi Rumiyuq lies east of Qucha Quchayuq Urqu and southeast of Iskay Wasi.
