= Pojo =

Pojo may refer to:

- Pojo, Cochabamba, a village in Bolivia
- Pojo Municipality, Bolivia, whose seat is Pojo
- Pojo, Finland, a Finnish bilingual former municipality
- POJO, abbreviation of plain old Java object in computer programming
- Poughkeepsie Journal
- A secret character in the 1996 arcade game and its 1997 N64 port Mace: The Dark Age, so called because of its chicken-like appearance and the on Spanish pollo
- A secret character/object with a chicken-like appearance in the video game Gauntlet Dark Legacy, which was created by the same company as the above-mentioned Mace: The Dark Age

== See also ==
- Pohja (disambiguation)
