= Pohja (disambiguation) =

Pohja is a former municipality of Finland.

Pohja may also refer to:

- Pohja, Kangasala, a former municipal centre of Kuhmalahti, now part of Kangasala
- Põhja, a village in northern Estonia
- Põhja-Kõrvemaa Nature Reserve in northern Estonia
- Põhja-Tallinn, an administrative district of Tallinn, the capital of Estonia
- Antti Pohja (born 1977), Finnish football player
- Pohja (myth), also known as Pohjola, a location in Finnish mythology

== See also ==
- Pohjola (disambiguation)
- Pojo (disambiguation)
