= Coacollo =

Coordinates: 16.4667°S 68.9064°W

Coacollo Q'uwa Qullu
- Town
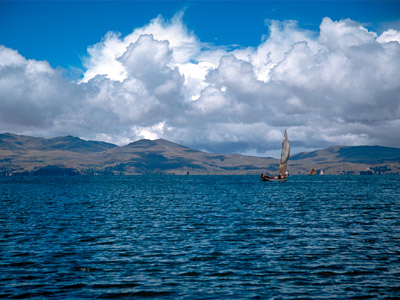
- Interactive map of Coacollo
- Country: Bolivia
- Department: La Paz Department
- Province: Ingavi Province
- Municipality: Taraco Municipality
- Time zone: UTC-4 (BOT)

Coacollo (from Aymara Q'uwa Qullu) is a small town in Bolivia. In 2009 it had an estimated population of 736.
