= Qucha Qucha =

Mountain in Bolivia

- Location within Bolivia

Highest point
- Elevation: 3,360 m (11,020 ft)
- Coordinates: 17°38′15″S 65°23′56″W

Geography
- Location: Bolivia, Cochabamba Department
- Parent range: Andes

Qucha Qucha (Quechua qucha lake, the reduplication indicates that there is a complex of something, "a complex of lakes", also spelled Khocha Khocha) is a mountain in the Bolivian Andes which reaches a height of approximately 3,360 m (11,020 ft). It is located in the Cochabamba Department, Carrasco Province, Pocona Municipality. Qucha Qucha lies southeast of the UNESCO World Heritage Site of Inkallaqta, north of the village of Pocona. The next peak to the northwest is Qutani (Aymara for "the one with a lake (or lakes)").
