= Totora, Cochabamba =

Totora
- Town
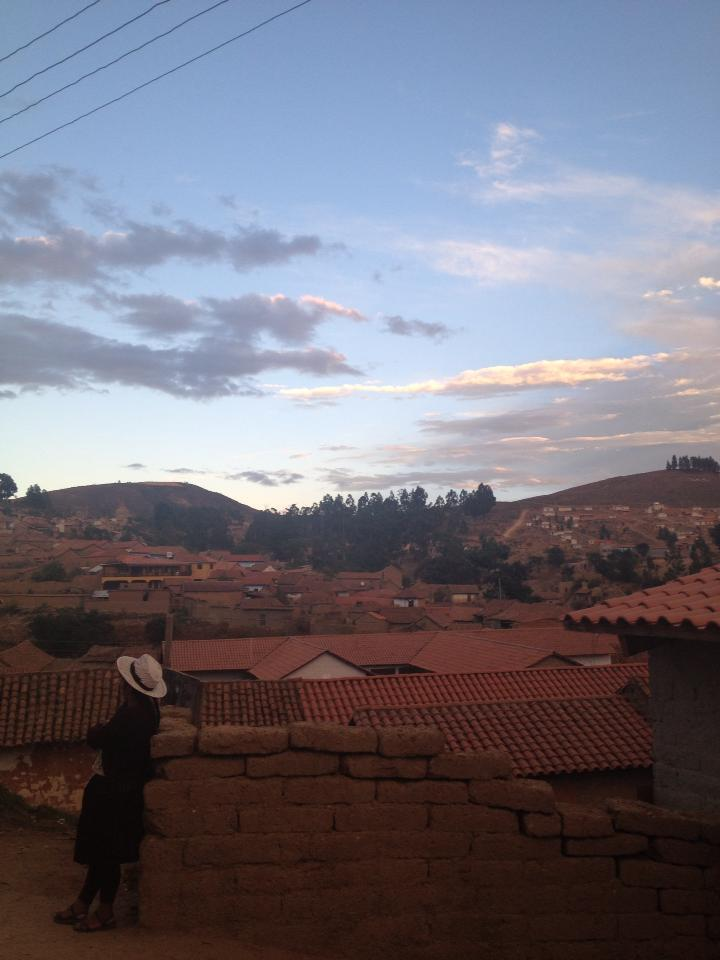
- Skyline, 2012
- Flag
- Nickname: City of the Pianos
- Location of Cochabamba Department in Bolivia

- Location of in Cochabamba Department
- Coordinates: 17°44′8″S 65°11′31″W
- Country: Bolivia
- Department: Cochabamba
- Province: Carrasco
- Settled: 24 June 1876
- Incorporated (city): 27 October 1894
- Named for: Tjutura, now-extinct aquatic plant from the area

Government
  - Type: Mayor–council government
  - Mayor: Emilio Mérida Meneces (MAS-IPSP)

Area
  - Total: 42 km^{2} (16 sq mi)
- Elevation: 2,805 m (9,203 ft)

Population (2012)
  - Total: 1,925
  - Density: 46/km^{2} (120/sq mi)
- Demonym: Totoreños

Ethnicity
  - Quechua: 88.6%
  - Aymara: 2.2%
  - Guaraní: 1.4%
  - Chiquitano: 0.3%
  - Other: 7.3%
- Time zone: UTC-4 (BOT)
- Country code: +591 4
- Website: www.totora.org

Totora (/toʊtʊərɑː/) (in Hispanicized spelling), Tutura or T'utura (Aymara and Quechua for Schoenoplectus californicus, an aquatic plant) is a town in the Carrasco Province of the Cochabamba Department in Bolivia. It is the capital and most-populous place of the Totora Municipality. As of the 2012 census, the population is 1,925. The first settlers were the Inca. Totora was officially settled in 1876, and declared a town by the Government of Bolivia in 1894.

== History ==
The first settlers of the city were from the Inca Empire. From 1530 until 1722, the land Totora occupied was in control of Spaniards, who mainly used the land for coca production. The first time the town was mentioned was in 1639, when a landowner named Don Fernando García Murillo had established a chaplaincy. The city was officially settled on 24 June 1876 after the Mizque Municipality was divided into the Mizque and the Totora Municipality. It was officially declared a city by the Bolivian Government on 27 October 1894. The first residents of Totora were wealthy landowners, traders, and textile artisans. It was also a trading stop between western and eastern Bolivia.

On 22 May 1998, a 6.8 M_{W} earthquake hit the Totora and Aiquile area. There were four foreshocks—ranging from 2.7 to 5.8—and consistent aftershocks until 27 May. 105 people were killed, and it was considered a "national tragedy" by then-President Hugo Banzer.

In 2000, Totora was declared "Cultural Heritage of Humanity" by the United Nations.

== Geography ==
=== Climate ===
Climate data for Pocona (Note: Pocona is located approximately 21 kilometres (13.0 mi) north-west of Totora.), elevation 2,658 m (8,720 ft)
Month	Jan	Feb	Mar	Apr	May	Jun	Jul	Aug	Sep	Oct	Nov	Dec	Year
Mean daily maximum °C (°F)	21.9 (71.4)	21.1 (70.0)	20.4 (68.7)	19.6 (67.3)	18.6 (65.5)	17.9 (64.2)	17.0 (62.6)	18.5 (65.3)	20.7 (69.3)	22.5 (72.5)	22.6 (72.7)	22.3 (72.1)	20.3 (68.5)
Daily mean °C (°F)	15.6 (60.1)	15.1 (59.2)	14.5 (58.1)	13.6 (56.5)	12.0 (53.6)	10.9 (51.6)	10.2 (50.4)	11.6 (52.9)	13.4 (56.1)	15.3 (59.5)	15.8 (60.4)	15.9 (60.6)	13.7 (56.6)
Mean daily minimum °C (°F)	9.4 (48.9)	9.1 (48.4)	8.7 (47.7)	7.6 (45.7)	5.3 (41.5)	4.0 (39.2)	3.4 (38.1)	4.6 (40.3)	6.2 (43.2)	8.0 (46.4)	9.0 (48.2)	9.4 (48.9)	7.1 (44.7)
Average precipitation mm (inches)	195.2 (7.69)	158.6 (6.24)	122.6 (4.83)	37.2 (1.46)	6.2 (0.24)	1.6 (0.06)	4.6 (0.18)	5.7 (0.22)	12.3 (0.48)	38.9 (1.53)	78.9 (3.11)	151.8 (5.98)	813.6 (32.02)
Average precipitation days	12.9	12.3	9.0	3.4	0.6	0.2	0.5	0.9	1.8	4.5	7.0	10.8	63.9
Average relative humidity (%)	68.1	66.6	66.6	63.3	51.7	44.3	39.2	43.3	48.3	54.2	62.6	62.5	55.9
Source: Servicio Nacional de Meteorología e Hidrología de Bolivia

== Demographics ==
Historical populations
Year	Pop.	±% p.a.
1845	1,000	—
1900	3,501	+2.30%
1992	1,347	−1.03%
2001	1,597	+1.91%
2012	1,925	+1.71%

According to the 2012 Bolivian census, the population of Totora was 1,925, an annual increase of 1.71% from 2001. The increase was unexpected, as the Association of Municipality of Cochabamba (AMDECO) projected the population to drop to 1,469. There were 892 (46.33%) men and 1,033 (53.66%) women, for a ratio of 1.15 women to men. In 2012, there were 1,069 homes, and 457 families, for an average household of 1.80 persons. Throughout history, the highest population of the city was 3,501 in 1992; the lowest population was 1,000 in 1845. With an estimated area of 42 km^{2} (16 sq mi), Totora has a population density of 46 people/km2.

Within the municipality Totora is the most-populous place, with 13.1% of the total population and, as of 2012, is the only town in its municipality with a population over 1,000. As of 2001, the racial makeup of the town was 88.6% Quechua, 2.2% Aymara, 1.4% Guaraní, 0.3% Chiquitano, and 7.3% from other races. As to languages, a majority of the population (65.4%) speak either Spanish or Quechua or both language. As of 2005, 98% of the population are of the Catholic religion and 2% are Evangelical.

== Cityscape ==
Totora is noted for having colonial-style building and architecture. Because of the town's topography, the streets have an atypical distribution. The most common style of house includes adobe walls, land floors, and cement roofing. From 1999 to 2005, 44.2% of the households use firewood to power their house, 55.1% use gas power, and 0.6% use other means. In 2011, solar panels were introduced in the town to power its schools, with the help of the European Union.

The protected Carrasco National Park is northeast of Totora. Created in 1991, the park has an area of 6,226 km^{2} (2,404 sq mi) and it ranges in altitude from 300 and 4,700 m (980 and 15,420 ft). It is estimated that there are 3,000 plant species, estimated 700 species of birds, and 382 confirmed type of wildlife located in the park. The main tourist attractions are The House of Culture, which used to be a mansion but is now a museum; the colonial bridges; the plaza; Phaqcha (Pajcha), a 30 m (98 ft) waterfall; Julpe, a place that holds cave paintings.

== Economy ==
In 2013, a deal was made with the Local Committee for the Productive Development of Wheat and Potato Township Totora to have around 300 families in Totora produce wheat for five cereal companies in Cochabamba.

== Education ==
There are three schools located in Totora: José Carrasco Torrico High school, named after ex-Vice President José Carrasco Torrico, Martin Mostajo Middle school and La Paz Middle School. The college has 320 students. The middle school was constructed in 2013 and cost Bs. 2,000,000 ($289436). It holds 11 classrooms and supports up to 250 students. As of 2001, the literacy rate in Totora is 82.4%, lower than the country average of 86.7%.

== Transportation ==
The main two ways to reach Totora by road are from Route 7, if coming from Cochabamba, and Route 5, if coming from Sucre. The Bolivian Department of Education is in the process of making a road from Tarata to Totora, since both are historic towns.
