= Pocona Canton =

Pocona Canton Puquna
- Canton
- Location of Pocona within Bolivia
- Coordinates: 17°39′0″S 65°24′0″W
- Country: Bolivia
- Department: Cochabamba Department
- Province: Carrasco Province
- Municipality: Pocona Municipality
- Seat: Pocona

Population (2001)
  - Total: 4,251

Pocona Canton (Quechua: Puquna) is one of the cantons of the Pocona Municipality in the Carrasco Province in the Cochabamba Department in central Bolivia.

== Visitor attractions ==
- Inkallaqta
