= Pocona =

Pocona Puquna
- Village
- Location within Bolivia
- Coordinates: 17°40′31″S 65°24′21″W
- Country: Bolivia
- Department: Cochabamba Department
- Province: Carrasco Province
- Municipality: Pocona Municipality
- Canton: Pocona Canton

Government
  - Mayor: Carlos Rodriguez Peredo (2008)
  - President: Felix Guardia (2008)

Population (2001)
  - Total: 244
- Time zone: UTC-4 (BOT)

Pocona (Quechua: Puquna) is a location in the Cochabamba Department in central Bolivia. It is the seat of the Pocona Municipality, the third municipal section of the Carrasco Province. At the time of census 2001 it had a population of 244.

== Climate ==
Climate data for Pocona, elevation 2,658 m (8,720 ft)
| Month | Jan | Feb | Mar | Apr | May | Jun | Jul | Aug | Sep | Oct | Nov | Dec | Year |
|---|---|---|---|---|---|---|---|---|---|---|---|---|---|
| Mean daily maximum °C (°F) | 21.9 (71.4) | 21.1 (70.0) | 20.4 (68.7) | 19.6 (67.3) | 18.6 (65.5) | 17.9 (64.2) | 17.0 (62.6) | 18.5 (65.3) | 20.7 (69.3) | 22.5 (72.5) | 22.6 (72.7) | 22.3 (72.1) | 20.3 (68.5) |
| Daily mean °C (°F) | 15.6 (60.1) | 15.1 (59.2) | 14.5 (58.1) | 13.6 (56.5) | 12.0 (53.6) | 10.9 (51.6) | 10.2 (50.4) | 11.6 (52.9) | 13.4 (56.1) | 15.3 (59.5) | 15.8 (60.4) | 15.9 (60.6) | 13.7 (56.6) |
| Mean daily minimum °C (°F) | 9.4 (48.9) | 9.1 (48.4) | 8.7 (47.7) | 7.6 (45.7) | 5.3 (41.5) | 4.0 (39.2) | 3.4 (38.1) | 4.6 (40.3) | 6.2 (43.2) | 8.0 (46.4) | 9.0 (48.2) | 9.4 (48.9) | 7.1 (44.7) |
| Average precipitation mm (inches) | 195.2 (7.69) | 158.6 (6.24) | 122.6 (4.83) | 37.2 (1.46) | 6.2 (0.24) | 1.6 (0.06) | 4.6 (0.18) | 5.7 (0.22) | 12.3 (0.48) | 38.9 (1.53) | 78.9 (3.11) | 151.8 (5.98) | 813.6 (32.02) |
| Average precipitation days | 12.9 | 12.3 | 9.0 | 3.4 | 0.6 | 0.2 | 0.5 | 0.9 | 1.8 | 4.5 | 7.0 | 10.8 | 63.9 |
| Average relative humidity (%) | 68.1 | 66.6 | 66.6 | 63.3 | 51.7 | 44.3 | 39.2 | 43.3 | 48.3 | 54.2 | 62.6 | 62.5 | 55.9 |
Source: Servicio Nacional de Meteorología e Hidrología de Bolivia

== Places of interest ==
- Inkallaqta

== See also ==
- Carrasco National Park
