= Entre Ríos Municipality =

Entre Ríos Municipality may refer to:

- Entre Ríos Municipality, Cochabamba, Bolivia
- Entre Ríos Municipality, Tarija, Bolivia
