= Lawayqu =

Mountain in Bolivia

- Location within Bolivia

Highest point
- Elevation: 4,185 m (13,730 ft)
- Coordinates: 17°34′02″S 65°30′02″W

Geography
- Location: Bolivia, Cochabamba Department
- Parent range: Andes

Lawayqu (Aymara for "long-necked", also spelled Lahuayko, Lawaykho) is a 4,185-metre-high (13,730 ft) mountain in the Bolivian Andes. It is located in the Cochabamba Department, Carrasco Province, Pocona Municipality. Lawayqu lies southwest of Jatun Salla and southeast of Qucha Quchayuq Urqu and Rumi Rumiyuq.
