= Entre Ríos, Cochabamba =

Entre Ríos
- Town
- Location within Bolivia
- Coordinates: 17°11′50″S 64°32′07″W
- Country: Bolivia
- Department: Cochabamba Department
- Province: Carrasco Province
- Municipality: Entre Ríos Municipality
- Elevation: 790 ft (240 m)

Population (2010 upgraded)
  - Total: 5,080
- Time zone: UTC-4 (BOT)

Entre Ríos is a small town in the Cochabamba Department of the South American Republic of Bolivia.

== Location ==
Entre Ríos is the capital of the Entre Ríos Municipality, which was newly established in 2004, the sixth municipal section of Carrasco Province.

The town is located at an elevation of 240 m (787 ft) in the central regions of Bolivia on the left bank of the Ichoa River, which 13 km (8.1 mi) downstream discharges into the Ichilo River.

== Geography ==
Entre Ríos is situated in the Bolivian lowlands on the north-eastern foothills of the Cordillera Oriental. The region has an average temperature of 24 °C, the monthly averages range from 26 °C (October to December) to 20 °C (June and July). The average yearly precipitation is higher than 1,000 mm (39 in), with a wet season from November to February and a drier season with less than 50 mm (2 in) per month in July and August.

== Regional traffic ==
Entre Ríos is located 265 km east of Cochabamba, the department's capital.
The small town is passed by the 1,657 km (1,030 mi) long state road Ruta 4, which goes from Tambo Quemado on the Chilenean border all through the country to Puerto Suárez on the Brazilian border. From Cochabamba to Entre Ríos the road passes Villa Tunari, Chimoré and Ivirgarzama, east of Entre Ríos the road leads to Warnes and Santa Cruz de la Sierra.

== Population ==
The population of the place has increased rapidly over the past two decades:

- 1992: 1,952 inhabitants (census)
- 2001: 3,796 inhabitants (census)
- 2010: 5,080 inhabitants (updating)

Due to the historically developed population distribution, the region is predominantly inhabited by Quechuas, 76.6 percent of the population in the Entre Ríos Municipality speak the Quechua language.
