= Machaqa Marka (Cochabamba) =

Mountain in Bolivia

- Location within Bolivia

Highest point
- Elevation: 3,862 m (12,671 ft)
- Coordinates: 17°34′50″S 65°24′57″W

Geography
- Location: Bolivia, Cochabamba Department
- Parent range: Andes

Machaqa Marka (Aymara machaqa new, marka village, "new village", also spelled Machacamarca) is a 3,862-metre-high (12,671 ft) mountain in the Bolivian Andes near a village of that name. It is located in the Cochabamba Department, Carrasco Province, Pocona Municipality, north of the UNESCO World Heritage Site of Inkallaqta. Machaqa Marka lies southeast of Jatun Salla and Mama Wasi.

Salla or Machaqa Marka is also the name of the river which originates near Jatun Salla and flows along the southern slope of Machaqa Marka. It runs to the southeast.
