= Puerto Villarroel =

- Location of Puerto Villarroel within Bolivia
- Coordinates: 16°52′0″S 64°46′59″W
- Country: Bolivia
- Department: Cochabamba Department
- Province: Carrasco Province
- Municipality: Puerto Villarroel Municipality
- Canton: Puerto Villarroel Canton
- Elevation: 548 ft (167 m)

Population (2001)
  - Total: 1,778
- Time zone: UTC-4 (BOT)

Puerto Villarroel is a locality in the Cochabamba Department in central Bolivia. It is the seat of Puerto Villarroel Municipality, the fifth municipal section of Carrasco Province. At the time of census 2001 it had a population of 1,778.
