= Cavernas de Repechón =

Cave system in Chapare Province, Bolivia

- Cuevas De Los Pajaros Nocturnos
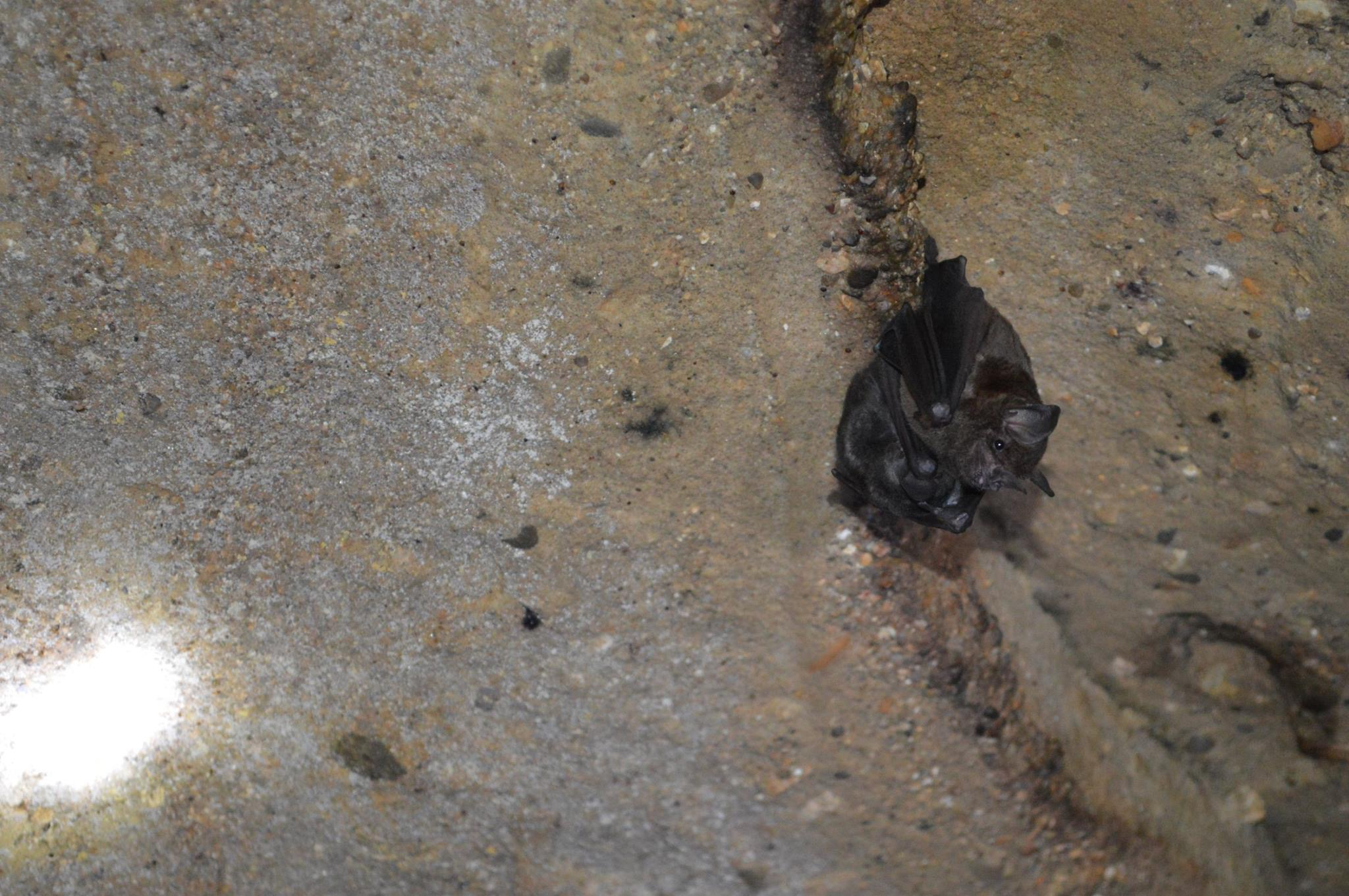
- Bats in the Repechón caves.
- Interactive map of Cavernas de Repechón
- Location: Carrasco National Park, Chapare Province
- Length: 50m to 150m

Cavernas de Repechón (Caverns of Repechon), or Cuevas De Los Pajaros Nocturnos (Caves of the Night Birds), is a karst cave system located in Carrasco National Park, Chapare Province, Bolivia. The park is home to a population of oilbirds, and is rarely visited as it very difficult to approach, and very remote.
