= Iskay Wasi =

Mountain in Bolivia

- Location within Bolivia

Highest point
- Elevation: 4,120 m (13,520 ft)
- Coordinates: 17°32′24″S 65°31′23″W

Geography
- Location: Bolivia, Cochabamba Department
- Parent range: Andes

Iskay Wasi (Quechua iskay two, wasi house, "two houses", also spelled Iscay Huasi) is a mountain in the Bolivian Andes which reaches a height of approximately 4,120 m (13,520 ft). It is located in the Cochabamba Department, at the border of the Arani Province, Vacas Municipality, and the Carrasco Province, Pocona Municipality. Iskay Wasi lies northeast of Qucha Quchayuq Urqu. The Iskay Wasi Mayu originates at the mountain. It flows to Misk'i Mayu.
