= Entre Ríos Municipality, Tarija =

Entre Ríos Municipality
- Municipality
- Location within Bolivia
- Coordinates: 21°31′35″S 64°10′24″W
- Country: Bolivia
- Department: Tarija Department
- Province: Burdett O'Connor Province
- Foundation: August 25, 1800
- Seat: Entre Ríos

Population (2024)
  - Total: 20,864
  - Ethnicities: Quechua
- Time zone: UTC-4 (BOT)

Entre Ríos Municipality is the only municipal section of the Burdett O'Connor Province in the Tarija Department in central Bolivia. Its seat, Entre Ríos, dates to 1616 and has taken the four names of Ciudad de Las Vegas de la Nueva Granada, Villa de San Carlos, San Luis, and finally San Luis de Entre Ríos. It is one of the 11 municipalities of Tarija Department.
