= Alonso de Ibáñez Province =

Alonso de Ibáñez
- Province
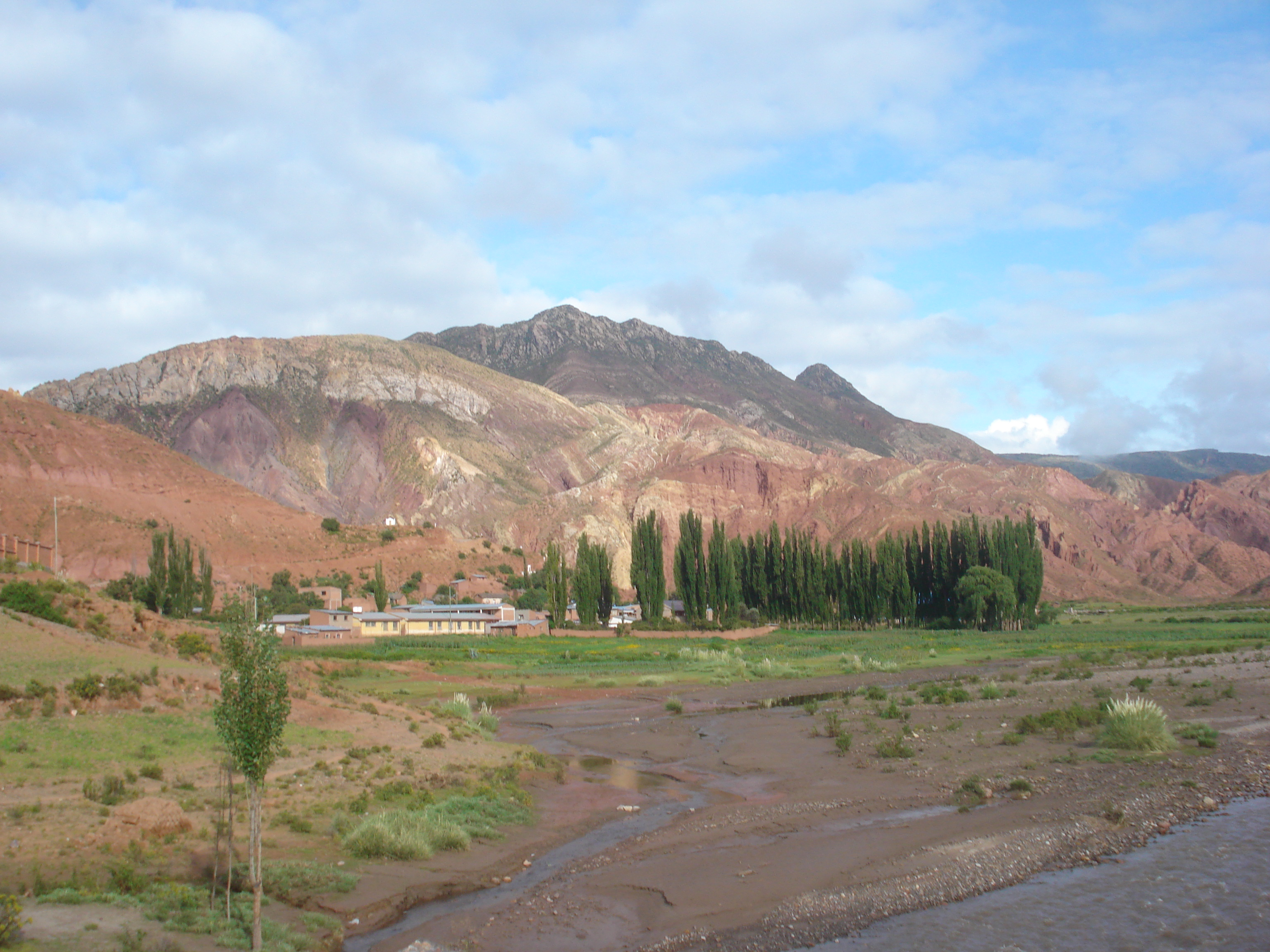
- Landscape at the Huanacoma River, Alonso de Ibáñez Province

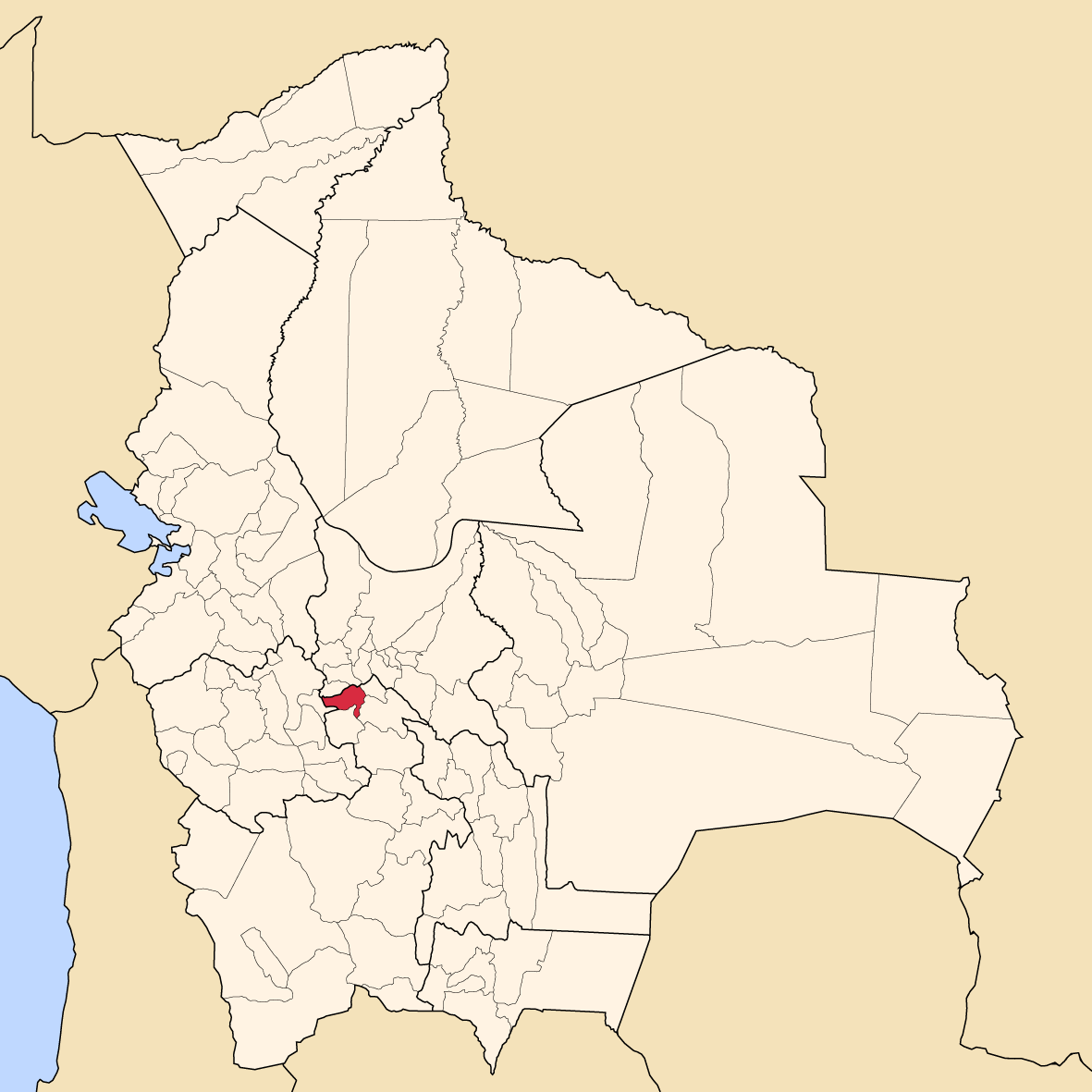
- Location of the Alonso de Ibáñez Province within Bolivia

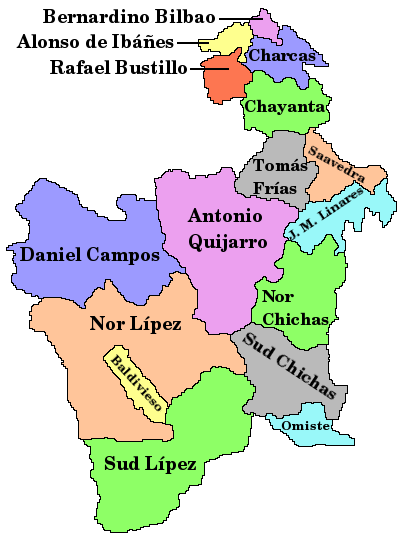
- Provinces of the Potosí Department
- Coordinates: 18°8′S 66°29′W
- Country: Bolivia
- Department: Potosí Department
- Municipalities: 2
- Cantons: 11
- Capital: Sacaca

Area
  - Total: 532 sq mi (1,378 km^{2})

Population (2024 census)
  - Total: 25,615
  - Density: 48.14/sq mi (18.59/km^{2})
  - Ethnicities: Quechua Aymara
- Time zone: UTC-4 (BOT)
- Area code: BO.PO.AI

Alonso de Ibáñez is a province in the northern parts of the Bolivian Potosí Department. Its capital is Sacaca (1,862 inhabitants in 2001).

== Location ==
Alonso de Ibáñez province is one of sixteen provinces in the Potosí Department. It is located between 17 56' und 18 20' South and between 66 10' und 66 48' West. It borders Cochabamba Department in the north, Oruro Department in the southwest, Rafael Bustillo Province in the south, Charcas Province in the southeast, and Bernardino Bilbao Province in the northeast. The province extends over 75 km from east to west and 60 km from north to south.

== Division ==
The province comprises two municipalities which are further subdivided into cantons.

Section	Municipality	Seat
1st	Sacaca Municipality	Sacaca
2nd	Caripuyu Municipality	Caripuyu

== Population ==
The main language of the province is Quechua, spoken by 88%, while 62% of the population speak Aymara and 49% speak Spanish. The population increased from 23,512 inhabitants (1992 census) to 27,755 (2001 census), an increase of 18%.

96% of the population have no access to electricity, 95% have no sanitary facilities. 78.5% of the population are employed in agriculture, 0.3% in mining, 8.7% in industry, 12.5% in general services. 95.5% of the population are Catholics, 3.5% Protestants.

The people are predominantly indigenous citizens of Quechua and Aymara descent.

Ethnic group	Sacaca Municipality (%)	Caripuyu Municipality (%)
Quechua	65,2	25,9
Aymara	29,8	71,2
Guaraní, Chiquitos, Moxos	0,0	0,0
Not indigenous	4,9	2,7
Other indigenous groups	0,1	0,1
