= Belisario Boeto Province =

- Province
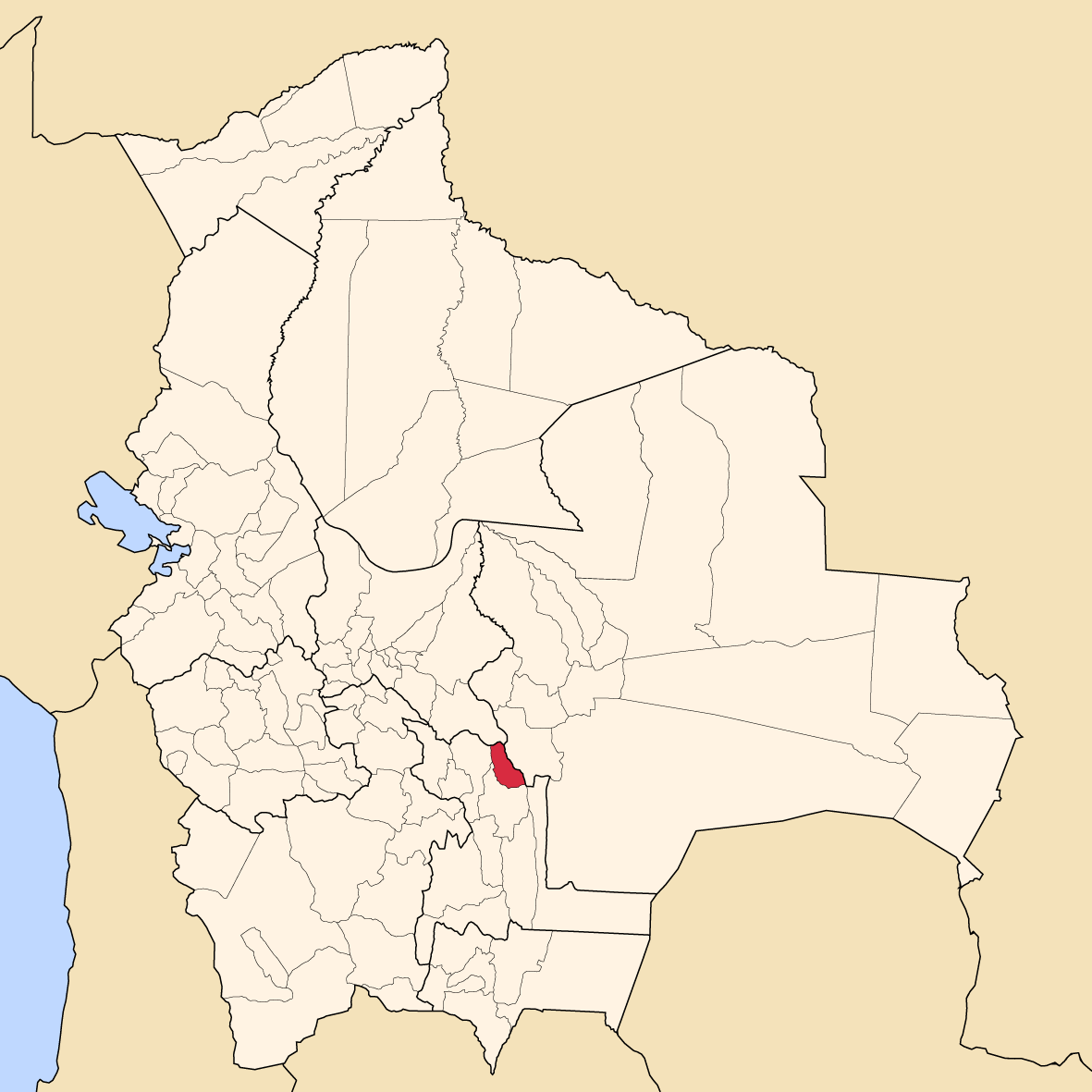
- Location of Belisario Boeto Province within Bolivia
- Coordinates: 18°55′S 64°20′W
- Country: Bolivia
- Department: Chuquisaca Department
- Capital: Villa Serrano

Area
  - Total: 658 sq mi (1,704 km^{2})
- Elevation: 7,900 ft (2,400 m)

Population (2024 census)
  - Total: 8,961
  - Density: 13.62/sq mi (5.259/km^{2})
  - Ethnicities: Quechuas
- Time zone: UTC-4 (BOT)

Belisario Boeto is a province in the Bolivian department of Chuquisaca.

== Subdivision ==
The province consists of only one municipality, Villa Serrano Municipality, which is identical to the province. Belisario Boeto Province is further subdivided into three cantons. The cantons with their seats are:

Canton	Seat
Villa Serrano Canton	Villa Serrano
Mendoza Canton	Mendoza
Urriolagoitia Canton	Urriolagoitia

== The people ==
The people are predominantly not indigenous, 36.0% are of Quechuan descent.

Ethnic group	Inhabitants (%)
Quechua	36.0
Aymara	0.2
Guaraní, Chiquitos, Moxos	0.2
Not indigenous	63.4
Other indigenous groups	0.1

Ref.: obd.descentralizacion.gov.bo

== Languages ==
The languages spoken in the province are mainly Spanish and Quechua.

Language	Inhabitants
Quechua	3,262
Aymara	24
Guaraní	2
Another native	0
Spanish	10,443
Foreign	19
Only native	1,133
Native and Spanish	2,138
Only Spanish	8,305

Ref.: obd.descentralizacion.gov.bo
