= Villa Serrano =

- Town
- Location within Bolivia
- Coordinates: 19°7′S 64°19′W
- Country: Bolivia
- Department: Chuquisaca Department
- Province: Belisario Boeto Province
- Municipality: Villa Serrano Municipality
- Canton: Villa Serrano Canton
- Elevation: 6,962 ft (2,122 m)

Population (2001)
  - Total: 2,877
- Time zone: UTC-4 (BOT)

Villa Serrano is a small town in the Chuquisaca Department, Bolivia. It is the seat of the Belisario Boeto Province. At the time of census 2001 it had 2,877 inhabitants.

The town is famous for its Christmas celebration, when people dance many "Chuntunquis" in honor of the Jesus Christ's birth.

During September 2019, Villa Serrano started to be consumed into burn. People asked for help to the Bolivian government but it was not given.

== Climate ==
Climate data for Villa Serrano, elevation 2,108 m (6,916 ft)
Month	Jan	Feb	Mar	Apr	May	Jun	Jul	Aug	Sep	Oct	Nov	Dec	Year
Mean daily maximum °C (°F)	25.2 (77.4)	24.4 (75.9)	24.4 (75.9)	23.4 (74.1)	23.0 (73.4)	23.1 (73.6)	23.3 (73.9)	24.1 (75.4)	24.7 (76.5)	26.0 (78.8)	25.7 (78.3)	25.8 (78.4)	24.4 (76.0)
Daily mean °C (°F)	19.1 (66.4)	18.4 (65.1)	18.3 (64.9)	16.9 (62.4)	15.1 (59.2)	13.8 (56.8)	13.5 (56.3)	14.7 (58.5)	16.3 (61.3)	18.2 (64.8)	18.7 (65.7)	19.2 (66.6)	16.8 (62.3)
Mean daily minimum °C (°F)	12.9 (55.2)	12.5 (54.5)	12.1 (53.8)	10.5 (50.9)	7.0 (44.6)	4.3 (39.7)	3.7 (38.7)	5.4 (41.7)	7.8 (46.0)	10.5 (50.9)	11.6 (52.9)	12.6 (54.7)	9.2 (48.6)
Average precipitation mm (inches)	148.6 (5.85)	149.8 (5.90)	109.9 (4.33)	43.5 (1.71)	11.8 (0.46)	3.5 (0.14)	3.9 (0.15)	9.4 (0.37)	22.3 (0.88)	53.9 (2.12)	82.9 (3.26)	130.7 (5.15)	770.2 (30.32)
Average precipitation days	11.5	11.3	9.2	5.3	2.2	0.9	1.0	1.6	3.2	5.6	7.8	9.6	69.2
Average relative humidity (%)	79.5	81.8	83.3	82.2	78.9	75.5	74.4	71.9	72.1	74.2	76.1	79.0	77.4
Source: Servicio Nacional de Meteorología e Hidrología de Bolivia
