= Qutani (Cochabamba) =

Mountain in the Bolivian Andes

- Location within Bolivia

Highest point
- Elevation: 3,482 m (11,424 ft)
- Coordinates: 17°38′02″S 65°24′54″W

Geography
- Location: Bolivia, Cochabamba Department
- Parent range: Andes

Qutani (Aymara quta lake, -ni a suffix, "the one with a lake (or lakes)", also spelled Khotani, Kkotani) is a 3,482-metre-high (11,424 ft) mountain in the Bolivian Andes. It is located in the Cochabamba Department, Carrasco Province, Pocona Municipality. Qutani lies south of the UNESCO World Heritage Site of Inkallaqta, north of the village of Pocona. The next peak to the southeast is Qucha Qucha (Quechua for "a complex of lakes").
