= P'isaqa (Cochabamba) =

Mountain in Bolivia

- Location within Bolivia

Highest point
- Elevation: 3,200 m (10,500 ft)
- Coordinates: 17°45′58″S 65°25′42″W

Geography
- Location: Bolivia, Cochabamba Department
- Parent range: Andes

P'isaqa (Aymara and Quechua for Nothoprocta, a bird, also spelled Pizaca) is a mountain in the Bolivian Andes which reaches a height of approximately 3,200 m (10,500 ft). It is located in the Cochabamba Department, Carrasco Province, Pocona Municipality. It lies at the Wanaku Mayu.
