= Yana Urqu (Carrasco) =

Mountain in Bolivia

- Location within Bolivia

Highest point
- Elevation: 3,200 m (10,500 ft)
- Coordinates: 17°45′56″S 65°24′38″W

Geography
- Location: Bolivia, Cochabamba Department
- Parent range: Andes

Yana Urqu (Quechua yana black, urqu mountain, "black mountain", also spelled Yana Orkho) is a mountain in the Bolivian Andes which reaches a height of approximately 3,200 m (10,500 ft). It is located in the Cochabamba Department, Carrasco Province, Pocona Municipality. It lies north of the Wanaku Mayu ("guanaco river").
