= Pohjola (disambiguation) =

Pohjola is a place in Finnish mythology.

Pohjola may also refer to:

== Places ==
- Nordic countries (Pohjoismaat in Finnish)
- Pohjola, Turku
- 3606 Pohjola, asteroid

== Surname ==
- Pohjola (surname), Finnish surname

== Companies and groups ==
- Pohjola Bank, Finnish company, precursor of OP Financial Group
- Pohjola Insurance Company (Palovakuutus-Osakeyhtiö Pohjola), Finnish company, precursor of OP Financial Group
- Pohjola-Norden, Finnish name for Foreningen Norden

== Other ==
- Pohjola Stadion, former name of Myyrmäen jalkapallostadion in Vantaa

== See also ==
- Pohjolan Liikenne, Finnish company
- Pohjolan Sanomat, Finnish newspaper
- Pohjolan Voima, Finnish company
