= Misk'i =

Mountain in Bolivia

- Location within Bolivia

Highest point
- Elevation: 2,880 m (9,450 ft)
- Coordinates: 17°46′42″S 65°23′08″W

Geography
- Location: Bolivia, Cochabamba Department
- Parent range: Andes

Misk'i (Aymara and Quechua for 'sweet' or 'honey', also spelled Mizque) is a mountain in the Bolivian Andes which reaches a height of approximately 2,880 m (9,450 ft). It is located in the Cochabamba Department, Carrasco Province, Pocona Municipality. It lies at the Wanaku Mayu ("guanaco river").
