= Taraco Municipality =

- Municipality
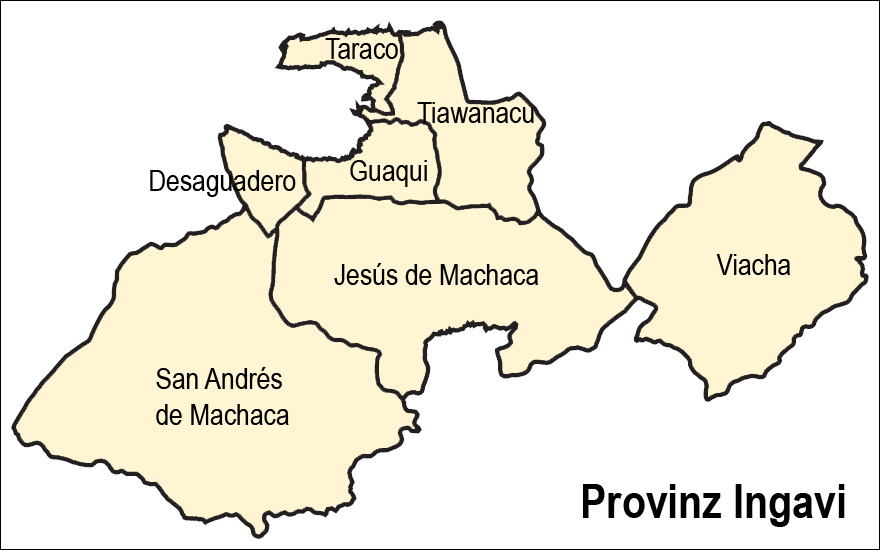
- Location of the municipality within Ingavi province

- Location of the Taraco Municipality within Bolivia
- Coordinates: 16°27′0″S 68°50′0″W
- Country: Bolivia
- Department: La Paz Department
- Province: Ingavi Province
- Seat: Taraco

Government
  - Mayor: Idelfonso Choque Cortez (2008)
  - President: Fidel Tapia Choquehuanca (2008)

Area
  - Total: 42 sq mi (108 km^{2})
- Elevation: 12,800 ft (3,900 m)

Population (2001)
  - Total: 5,922
- Time zone: UTC-4 (BOT)

Taraco Municipality is the seventh municipal section of the Ingavi Province in the La Paz Department, Bolivia. Most of its area is situated on Taraco Peninsula jutting into Lake Wiñaymarka, the southern branch of Lake Titicaca. Its seat is Taraco.

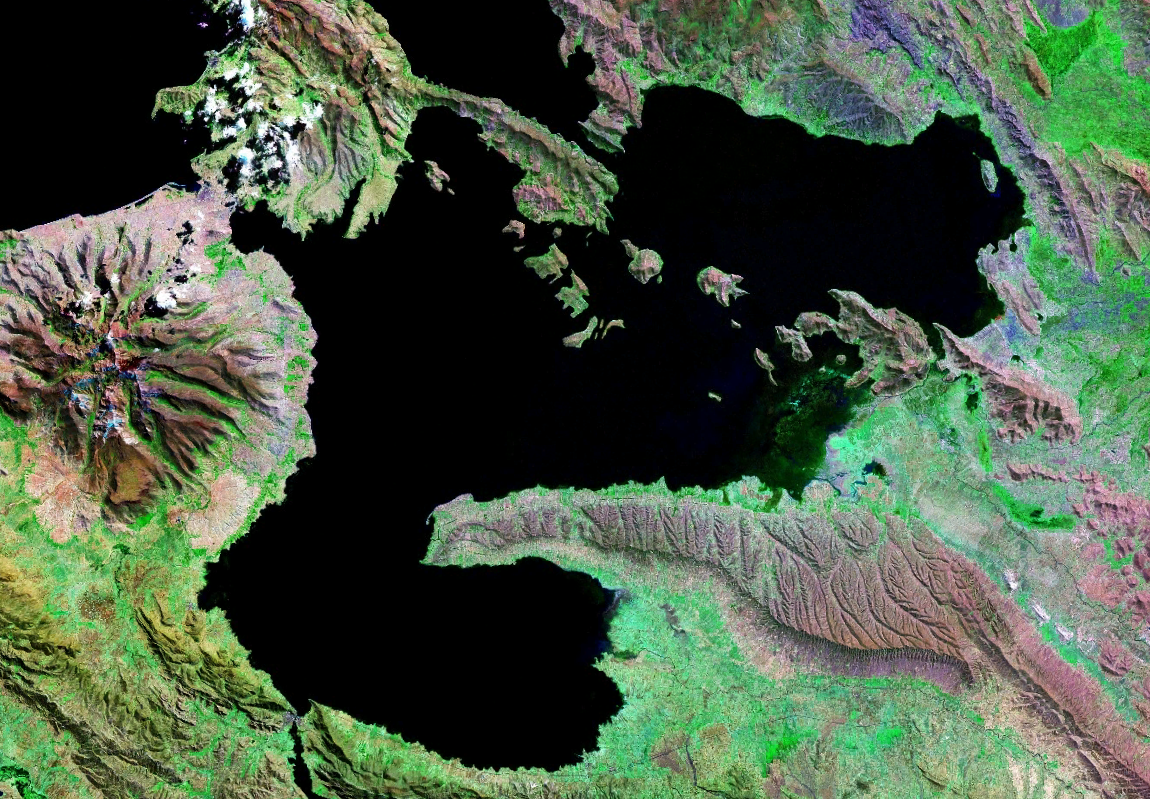
Taraco Peninsula (in the middle) in Lake Wiñaymarka (Titicaca)

== Division ==
The municipality is divided into the following cantons:

- Santa Rosa de Taraco - 1,071 inhabitants (2001)
- Taraco - 4,851 inhabitants

== The people ==
The people are predominantly indigenous citizens of Aymara descent.

Ethnic group	%
Quechua	0.2
Aymara	96.4
Guaraní, Chiquitos, Moxos	0.0
Not indigenous	3.3
Other indigenous groups	0.1

== Places of interest ==
Some of the tourist attractions of the municipalities are:

- the archaeological sites on Taraco Peninsula:
  - Chiripa and its museum
  - Kala Uyuni, Pumani and Achacachi Coacollo in Coacollo
  - Iwawi (Kolata Quenacache, Ojje Puku, Awichu and Chojna Qala) in Higuagui Grande
- Sikuya Island in Taraco Canton
- The church of Taraco dating from 1767
- Taraco museum in Taraco Canton
