= Totora Municipality =

Totora T'utura
- Municipality
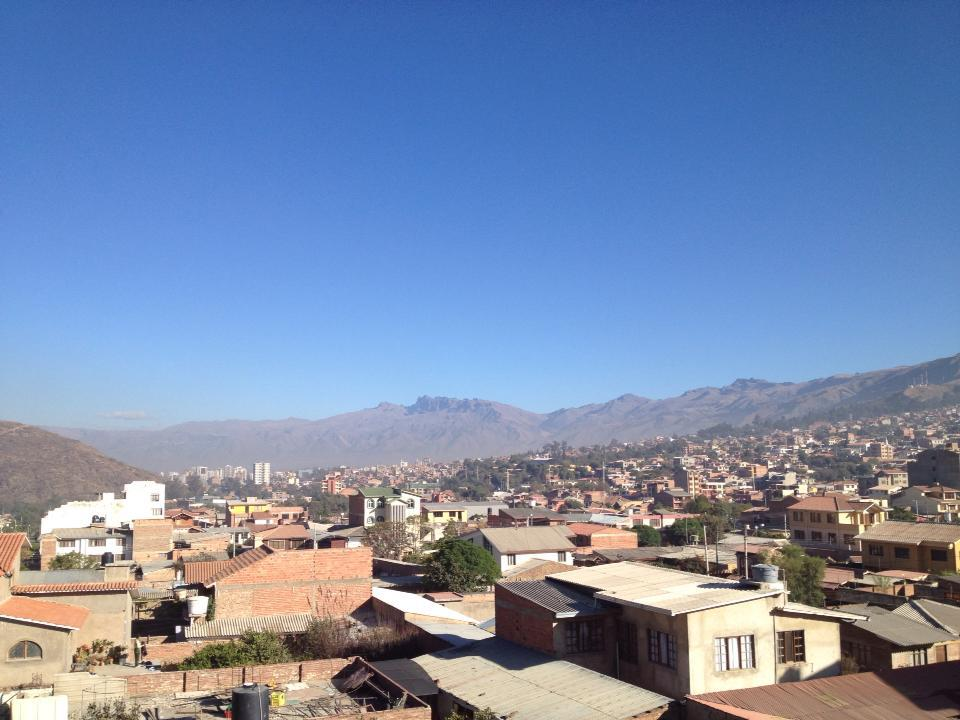
- View of Totora

- Location within Bolivia
- Coordinates: 17°42′S 65°11′W
- Country: Bolivia
- Department: Cochabamba Department
- Province: Carrasco Province
- Seat: Totora

Government
  - Mayor: Nicolas Rosas Jaldin
  - President: Gabriel Zurita
- Elevation: 9,200 ft (2,800 m)

Population (2001)
  - Total: 12,961
  - Ethnicities: Quechua
- Time zone: UTC-4 (BOT)

Totora Municipality is the first municipal section of the Carrasco Province in the Cochabamba Department, Bolivia. Its seat is Totora.

== Subdivision ==
Totora Municipality is divided into four cantons.

Canton	Inhabitants (2001)	Seat
Totora Canton	10,203	Totora
Arepucho Canton	360	Arepucho
Icuna Canton	199	Icuna
Tiraque "C" Canton	2,199	Tiraque "C"

== Languages ==
The languages spoken in the municipality are mainly Quechua and Spanish.

Language	Inhabitants
Quechua	11,671
Aymara	72
Guaraní	7
Another native	16
Spanish	4,967
Foreign	32
Only native	7,060
Native and Spanish	4,645
Only Spanish	322
