= Pocona Municipality =

- Municipality
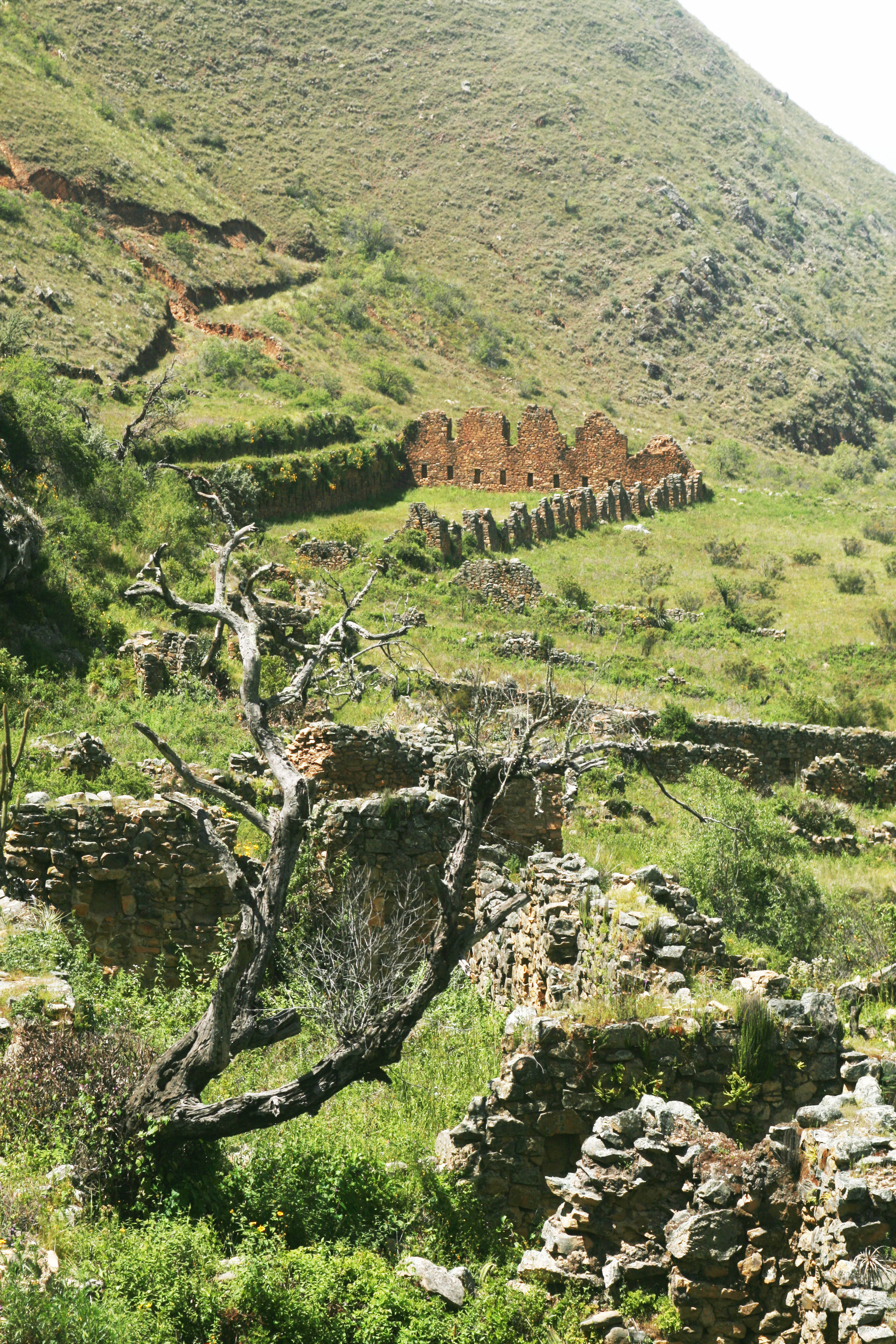
- The UNESCO World Heritage Site of Inkallaqta in the Pocona Municipality

- Flag

- Location of the Pocona Municipality within Bolivia
- Coordinates: 17°40′0″S 65°12′0″W
- Country: Bolivia
- Department: Cochabamba Department
- Province: Carrasco Province
- Seat: Pocona

Government
  - Mayor: Carlos Rodriguez Peredo (2008)
  - President: Felix Guardia (2008)
- Elevation: 13,000 ft (4,000 m)

Population (2001)
  - Total: 13,488
  - Density: 40/sq mi (15.5/km^{2})
- Time zone: UTC-4 (BOT)

Pocona Municipality is the third municipal section of the Carrasco Province in the Cochabamba Department in Bolivia. Its seat is Pocona. At the time of census 2001 the municipality had 13,488 inhabitants.

== Geography ==
Some of the highest mountains of the municipality are listed below:

- Ch'uru Wayq'u
- Ch'utu Ch'utu
- Iskay Wasi
- Jatun Muqu
- Jatun Pampa
- Jatun Salla
- Juch'uy
- Lawayqu
- Layqa
- Machaqa Marka
- Mama Rumi
- Mama Wasi
- Misk'i
- Nina
- Putu Phutunqu
- P'isaqa
- P'ukru
- Qucha Qucha
- Qucha Quchayuq Urqu
- Qutani
- Rumi Rumiyuq
- Salla Punta
- Sallani
- Tawri
- T'utura
- Wathiya
- Yana Urqu
- Yuraq Qallpa
- Yuraq Yuraq

== Cantons ==
The municipality is divided into five cantons.

Canton	Inhabitants (2001)	Seat	Inhabitants (2001)
Pocona Canton	4.251	Pocona / Puquna	244
Chimboata Canton	963	Chimboata / Chimpuwata	69
Chillicchi Canton	405	Chillicchi	130
Huayapacha Canton	5,461	Huayapacha / Wayapacha	206
Conda Canton	2,408	Conda	311

== People ==
Some data:

Pocona Municipality	
National ranking (out of 314 municipalities)	264
Human Development Index (2001)	0.475
Life Expectancy Index	0.526
Education Index	0.576
Life expectancy (years)	56.6
Literacy of adults (% of 15 years old and more)	72.0
Average years of schooling	3.3
Population census 2001	13,488
Percentage of rural population	100.0%

== Languages ==
The languages spoken in the Pocona Municipality are mainly Quechua and Spanish.

Language	Inhabitants
Quechua	12,482
Aymara	39
Guaraní	3
Another native	6
Spanish	4,954
Foreign	22
Only native	7,706
Native and Spanish	4,790
Only Spanish	166

== Economy ==
The principal economic activities are the cultivation of stone fruit and potatoes and tourism.

== Places of interest ==
The monumental Inca site of Inkallaqta is situated in the Pocona Municipality.

== See also ==
- Julpe River
