= Sacaca =

- Location in Bolivia
- Coordinates: 18°4′10″S 66°23′4″W
- Country: Bolivia
- Department: Potosí Department
- Province: Alonso de Ibáñez Province
- Municipality: Sacaca Municipality
- Canton: Sacaca Canton
- Elevation: 12,057 ft (3,675 m)

Population (2012)
  - Total: 2,292
- Time zone: UTC-4 (BOT)

Sacaca is a village located in the Potosí Department of Bolivia. It is the capital of the Sacaca Canton, Sacaca Municipality and Alonso de Ibáñez Province.

== Climate ==
Climate data for Sacaca, elevation 3,722 m (12,211 ft)
Month	Jan	Feb	Mar	Apr	May	Jun	Jul	Aug	Sep	Oct	Nov	Dec	Year
Mean daily maximum °C (°F)	17.4 (63.3)	17.3 (63.1)	18.0 (64.4)	18.4 (65.1)	18.1 (64.6)	17.1 (62.8)	16.9 (62.4)	17.7 (63.9)	18.2 (64.8)	19.1 (66.4)	19.3 (66.7)	18.8 (65.8)	18.0 (64.4)
Mean daily minimum °C (°F)	5.0 (41.0)	4.6 (40.3)	4.0 (39.2)	1.5 (34.7)	−2.5 (27.5)	−4.8 (23.4)	−4.9 (23.2)	−3.0 (26.6)	−0.3 (31.5)	2.0 (35.6)	3.3 (37.9)	4.6 (40.3)	0.8 (33.4)
Average precipitation mm (inches)	112.3 (4.42)	82.3 (3.24)	64.2 (2.53)	20.4 (0.80)	3.4 (0.13)	3.4 (0.13)	1.9 (0.07)	7.6 (0.30)	16.9 (0.67)	23.2 (0.91)	40.2 (1.58)	70.5 (2.78)	446.3 (17.56)
Average relative humidity (%)	52.8	53.4	53.1	51.6	49.2	48.8	47.1	45.0	44.3	44.7	45.8	49.1	48.7
Source: Servicio Nacional de Meteorología e Hidrología de Bolivia
