= Entre Ríos Municipality, Cochabamba =

Entre Ríos Municipality
- Municipality
- Location within Bolivia
- Coordinates: 17°20′S 64°32′W
- Country: Bolivia
- Department: Cochabamba Department
- Province: Carrasco Province
- Foundation: July 4, 2009
- Seat: Entre Ríos

Population (2001)
  - Total: 22,187
  - Ethnicities: Quechua
- Time zone: UTC-4 (BOT)

Entre Ríos Municipality is the sixth municipal section of the Carrasco Province in the Cochabamba Department in central Bolivia. Its seat, Entre Ríos, had 3,796 inhabitants at the time of the 2001 census.

== Languages ==
The languages spoken in the municipality are mainly Spanish and Quechua.

Language	Inhabitants
Quechua	14,789
Aymara	907
Guaraní	41
Another native	27
Spanish	17,164
Foreign	142
Only native	3,207
Native and Spanish	11,864
Only Spanish	5,314
