= Pojo, Cochabamba =

Pojo
- Location of Pojo within Bolivia
- Coordinates: 17°45′0″S 64°49′0″W
- Country: Bolivia
- Department: Cochabamba Department
- Province: Carrasco Province
- Municipality: Pojo Municipality
- Canton: Pojo Canton

Population (2001)
  - Total: 706
- Time zone: UTC-4 (BOT)

Pojo is a village in the Cochabamba Department in central Bolivia. It is the seat of Pojo Municipality, the second municipal section of Carrasco Province. At the time of census 2001 it had a population of 706.
