= Layqa (Bolivia) =

Mountain in Bolivia

- Location within Bolivia

Highest point
- Elevation: 2,960 m (9,710 ft)
- Coordinates: 17°44′12″S 65°25′13″W

Geography
- Location: Bolivia, Cochabamba Department
- Parent range: Andes

Layqa (Aymara and Quechua, also spelled Laica) is a mountain in the Bolivian Andes which reaches a height of approximately 2,960 m (9,710 ft). It is located in the Cochabamba Department, Carrasco Province, Pocona Municipality.
