= Pohjola (surname) =

Pohjola is a Finnish surname. Notable people with the surname include:

- Jukka Pohjola (1878–1948), Finnish politician
- Pekka Pohjola (1952–2008), composer and producer
- Kaija Pohjola (born 1951), singer
- Matti Pohjola, economist
- Ilmari Pohjola, trombonist, see Ultra Bra
- Mika Pohjola (born 1971), musician
- Mike Pohjola (born 1978), game designer
- Verneri Pohjola (born 1977), Finnish jazz trumpeter
