= Puerto Villarroel Municipality =

- Municipality
- Flag

- Location within Bolivia
- Coordinates: 16°55′S 64°45′W
- Country: Bolivia
- Department: Cochabamba Department
- Province: Carrasco Province
- Seat: Puerto Villarroel

Government
  - Mayor: Felix Acosta Vasquez (2007)
  - President: Desiderio Mendoza Tococari (2007)
- Elevation: 660 ft (200 m)

Population (2001)
  - Total: 40,790
  - Ethnicities: Quechua Yuracaré
- Time zone: UTC-4 (BOT)

Puerto Villarroel Municipality is the fifth municipal section of the Carrasco Province in the Cochabamba Department, Bolivia. Its seat is Puerto Villarroel.

== The people ==
The people are predominantly indigenous citizens of Quechuan descent. There are also groups of Yuracaré.

Ethnic group	Inhabitants (%)
Quechua	79.9
Aymara	3.1
Guaraní, Chiquitos, Moxos	1.1
Not indigenous	14.6
Other indigenous groups	1.3

== Languages ==
The languages spoken in the municipality are mainly Quechua and Spanish.

Language	Inhabitants
Quechua	29,940
Aymara	1,590
Guaraní	39
Another native	235
Spanish	29,377
Foreign	199
Only native	8,131
Native and Spanish	22,426
Only Spanish	6,956
