= Pojo Municipality =

- Municipality
- Flag

- Location within Bolivia
- Coordinates: 17°20′S 64°42′W
- Country: Bolivia
- Department: Cochabamba Department
- Province: Carrasco Province
- Seat: Pojo

Government
  - Mayor: Pedro Rojas Rocha
  - President: Flabio Jaldín Coria

Population (2001)
  - Total: 11,515
  - Ethnicities: Quechua
- Time zone: UTC-4 (BOT)

Pojo Municipality is the second municipal section of the Carrasco Province in the Cochabamba Department, Bolivia. Its seat is Pojo.

== Languages ==
The languages spoken in the municipality are mainly Quechua and Spanish.

Language	Inhabitants
Quechua	10,203
Aymara	74
Guaraní	9
Another native	9
Spanish	4,991
Foreign	15
Only native	5,623
Native and Spanish	4,598
Only Spanish	393
