= Taraco, La Paz =

Coordinates: 16°27′S 68°52′W

- Town
- Interactive map of Taraco, La Paz
- Country: Bolivia
- Department: La Paz Department
- Time zone: UTC-4 (BOT)
- Climate: Cwc

Taraco, La Paz is a town in the La Paz Department, Bolivia.
