= Qucha Quchayuq Urqu =

Mountain in Bolivia

- Location within Bolivia

Highest point
- Elevation: 4,304 m (14,121 ft) B
- Coordinates: 17°32′54″S 65°31′33″W

Geography
- Location: Bolivia, Cochabamba Department, Carrasco Province
- Parent range: Andes

Qucha Quchayuq Urqu (Quechua qucha lake, the reduplication indicates that there is a group or a complex of something, -yuq a suffix, urqu mountain, "a mountain with many lakes", also spelled Khocha Khochayoj Orkho) is a 4,304-metre-high (14,121 ft) mountain in the Bolivian Andes. It is located in the Cochabamba Department, the Carrasco Province, Pocona Municipality, near the border with the Arani Province, Vacas Municipality. Qucha Quchayuq Urqu lies on a ridge east of Vacas, southwest of Rumi Rumiyuq.
