= Carrasco Province =

- Province
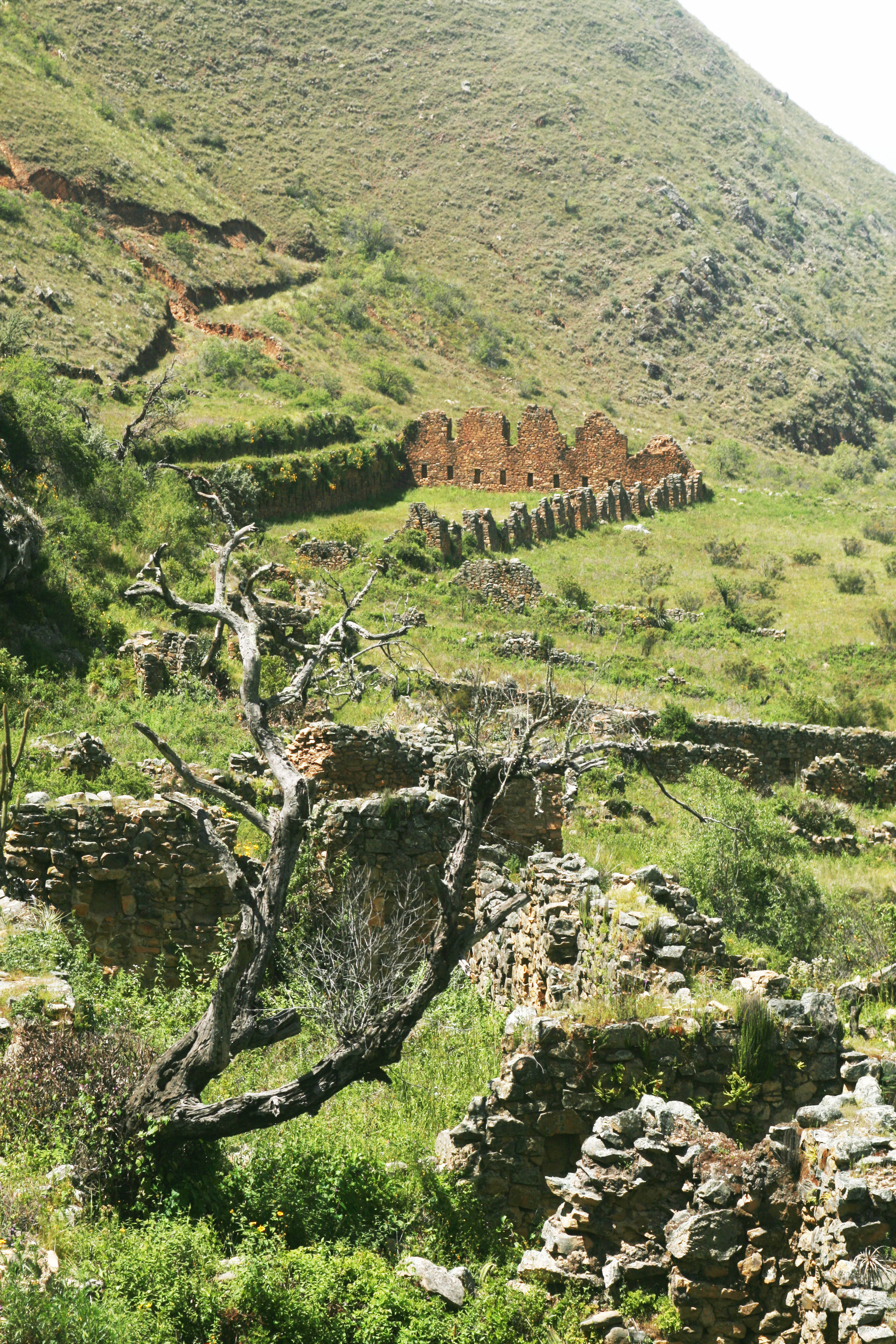
- The UNESO World Heritage Site of Inkallaqta in the Carrasco Province

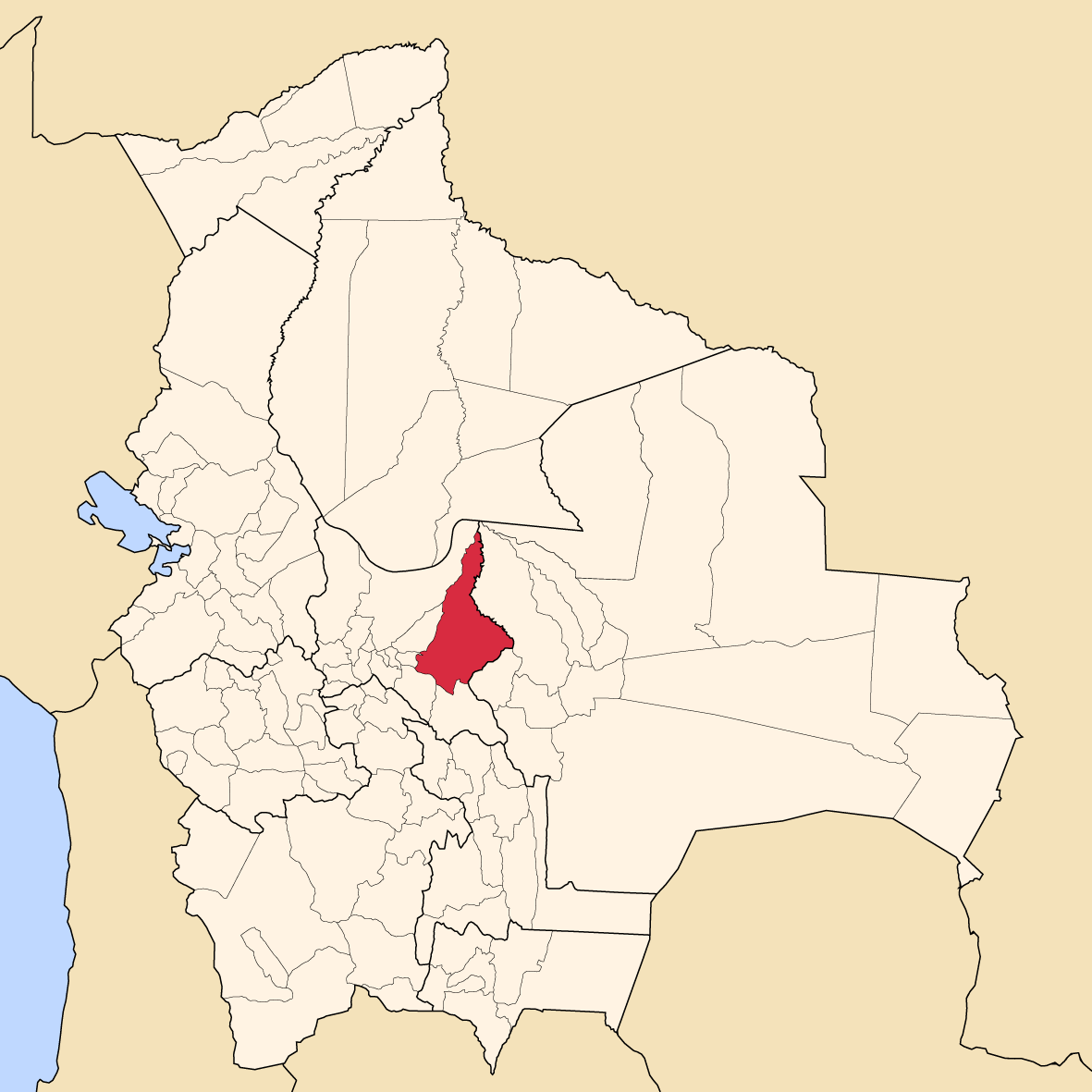
- Location of the Carrasco Province within Bolivia

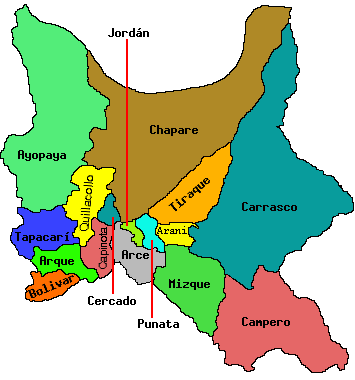
- Provinces of the Cochabamba Department
- Coordinates: 17°20′0″S 65°20′0″W
- Country: Bolivia
- Department: Cochabamba Department
- Municipalities: 6
- Cantons: 24
- Capital: Totora

Government
  - Mayor: Nicolas Rosas Jaldin

Area
  - Total: 5,809 sq mi (15,045 km^{2})

Population (2024 census)
  - Total: 176,061
  - Density: 30.309/sq mi (11.702/km^{2})
  - Ethnicities: Quechua Yuracaré
- Time zone: UTC-4 (BOT)

Carrasco is a province in the Cochabamba Department in central Bolivia. Its capital is Totora.

== Geography ==
Some of the highest mountains of the province are listed below:

- Apachita
- Ch'uru Wayq'u
- Ch'utu Ch'utu
- Iskay Wasi
- Jatun Muqu
- Jatun Pampa
- Jatun Salla
- Juch'uy
- Lawayqu
- Layqa
- Machaqa Marka
- Mama Rumi
- Mama Wasi
- Misk'i
- Nina
- Putu Phutunqu
- P'isaqa
- P'ukru
- Qucha Qucha
- Qucha Quchayuq Urqu
- Qutani
- Rumi Rumiyuq
- Salla Punta
- Sallani
- Tawri
- T'utura
- Wasa Mayu
- Wathiya
- Yana Urqu
- Yuraq Qallpa
- Yuraq Yuraq

== Subdivision ==
Carrasco Province is divided into six municipalities which are further subdivided into cantons.

Section	Municipality	Inhabitants 2001	Seat	Inhabitants
1st	Totora Municipality	12,961	Totora	1,597
2nd	Pojo Municipality	11,515	Pojo	786
3rd	Pocona Municipality	13,488	Pocona	244
4th	Chimoré Municipality	15,264	Chimoré	3,874
5th	Puerto Villarroel Municipality	40,790	Puerto Villarroel	1,778
6th	Entre Ríos Municipality	30,398	Entre Ríos	3,796

Entre Ríos Municipality was created in 2004.

== The people ==
The people are predominantly indigenous citizens of Quechuan descent. There are also groups of Yuracaré along Chapare River in the municipalities Chimoré and Puerto Villarroel.

Ethnic group	Totora Municipality (%)	Pojo Municipality (%)	Pocona Municipality (%)	Chimoré Municipality (%)	Puerto Villarroel Municipality (%)	Entre Ríos Municipality (%)
Quechua	93.9	88.5	94.0	67.6	79.9	76.3
Aymara	0.7	0.5	0.2	5.1	3.1	3.8
Guarani, Chiquitos, Moxos	0.9	0.0	0.1	2.0	1.1	1.6
Not indigenous	4.4	10.8	5.6	20.1	14.6	17.4
Other indigenous groups	0.1	0.2	0.9	5.1	1.3	0.9

== Languages ==
The languages spoken in the Carrasco Province are mainly Quechua and Spanish. The following table shows the number of those belonging to the recognized group of speakers.

Language	Totora Municipality	Pojo Municipality	Pocona Municipality	Chimoré Municipality	Puerto Villarroel Municipality	Entre Ríos Municipality
Quechua	11,671	10,203	12,482	9,596	29,940	14,789
Aymara	72	74	39	965	1,590	907
Guarani	7	9	3	19	39	41
Another native	16	9	6	424	235	27
Spanish	4,967	4,991	4,954	11,530	29,377	17,164
Foreign	32	15	22	128	199	142
Only native	7,060	5,623	7,706	2,518	8,131	3,207
Native and Spanish	4,645	4,598	4,790	7,811	22,426	11,864
Only Spanish	322	393	166	3,726	6,956	5,314

== Visitor attractions ==
Carrasco National Park and the archaeological site of Inkallaqta are situated within the province.
