= Carrasco National Park =

National park in Cochabamba Department, Bolivia

- IUCN category II (national park)
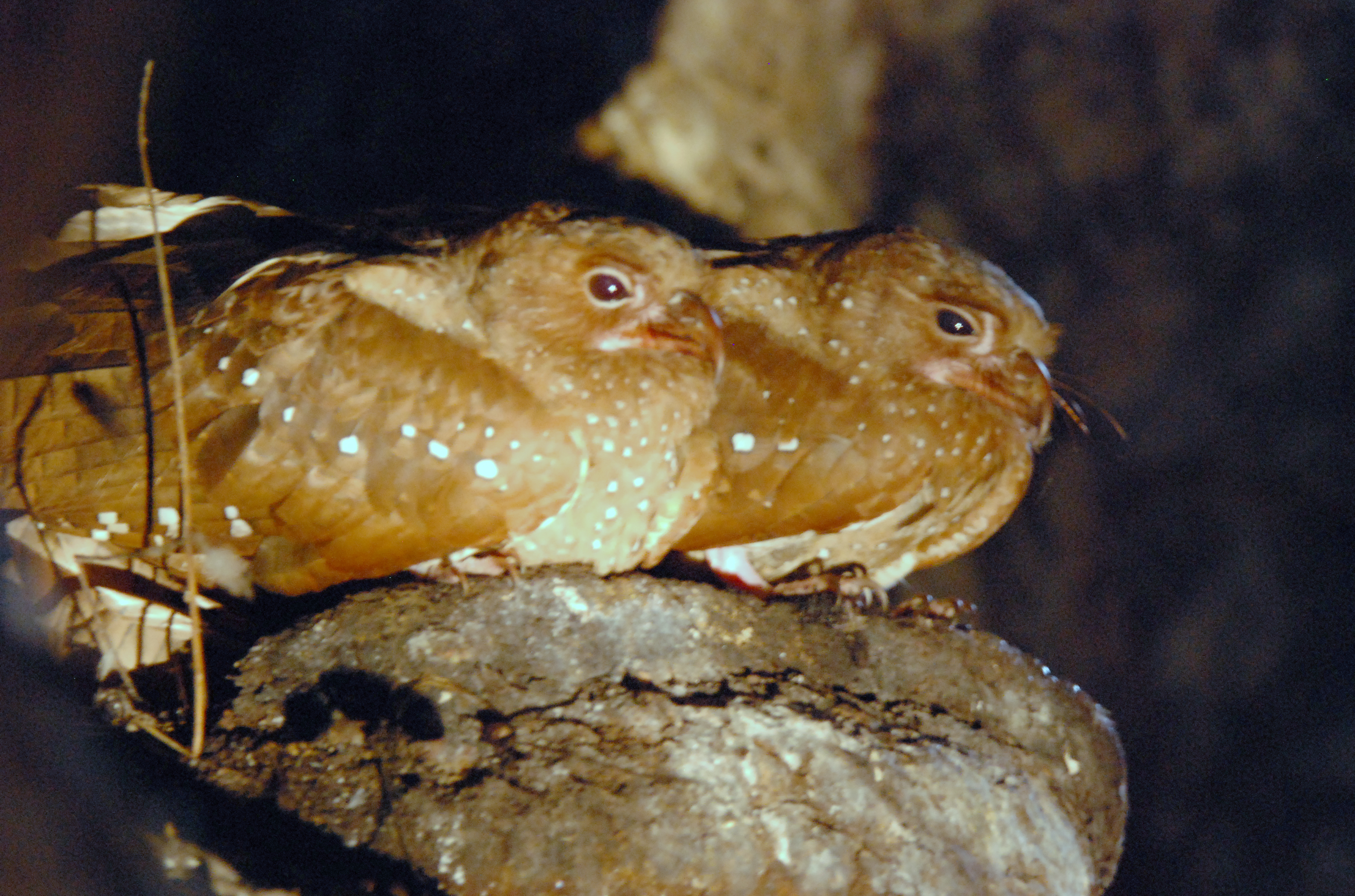
- Oilbirds

- Location within Bolivia
- Location: Bolivia; Cochabamba Department
- Coordinates: 17°23′S 65°03′W
- Area: 622,600 ha (1,538,000 acres)
- Established: 1991
- Governing body: Servicio Nacional de Áreas Protegidas (SERNAP)

Carrasco National Park is a national park in Cochabamba Department, Bolivia. It has a surface area of 6,226 square kilometers. More than 5,000 plant species have been registered in the area, placing the park among Bolivia's most biologically diverse. It is a protected area and people are prohibited from living inside the park. It was created on October 11, 1991. The park is a mountainous landscape of rivers, waterfalls, gentle valleys and deep canyons. It protects part of the Bolivian Yungas ecoregion. There is exuberant vegetation that protects and harbors several animals, plants and trees that are in danger of extinction.

The park is located to the east of Cochabamba Department and extends along the provinces of Carrasco, Tiraque and Chapare.
