= Inkallaqta =

Archaeological site in Bolivia

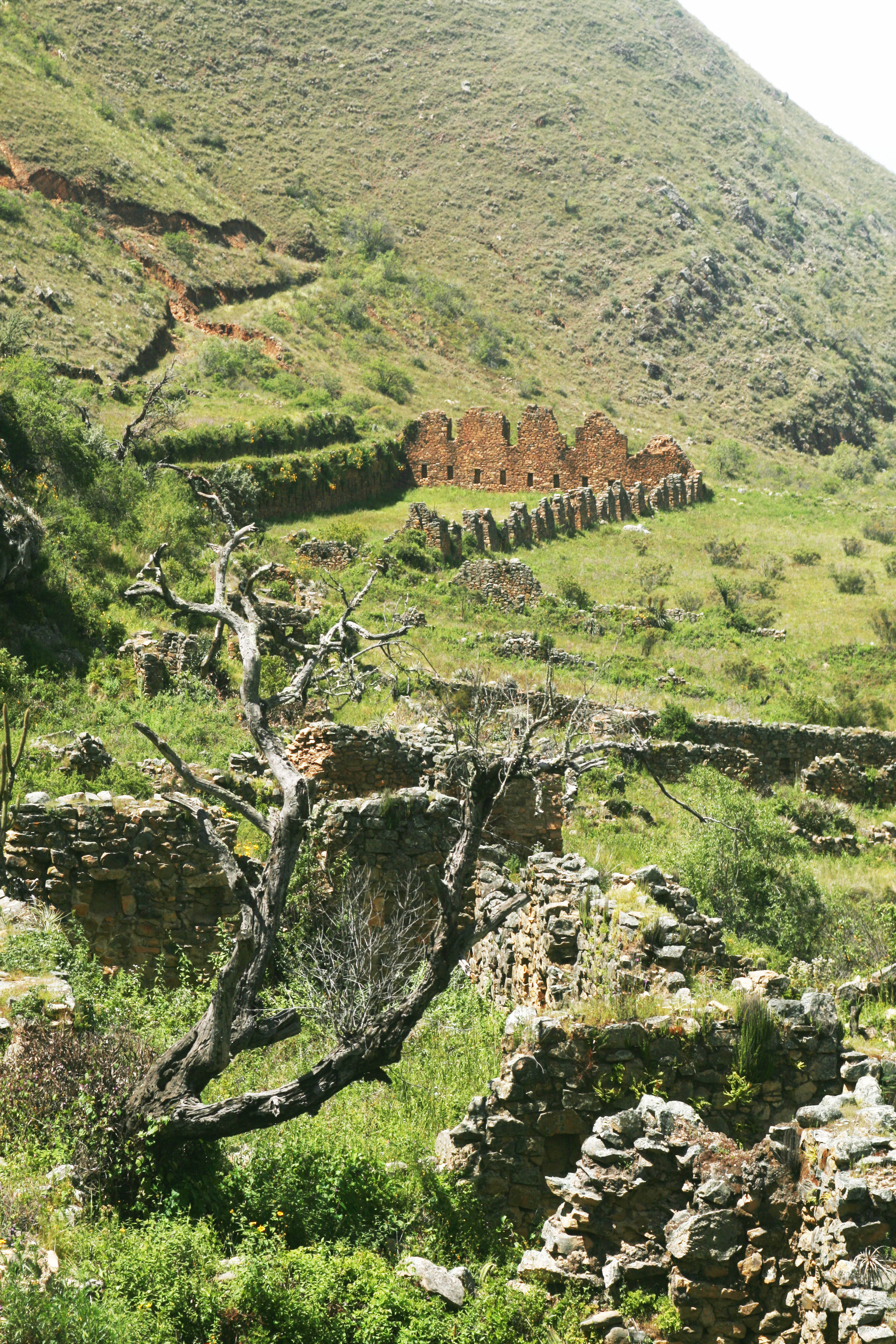
- Interactive map of the Inkallaqta area

General information
- Architectural style: Inca
- Location: Cochabamba Department, Bolivia
- Coordinates: 17°36′18″S 65°24′57″W
- Elevation: 2,950 m (9,680 ft)

Inkallaqta (Quechua inka Inca, llaqta place (village, town, city, country, nation), "Inca place", Hispanicized spellings Incallacta, Incallajta, Incallakta, Inkallajta, Inkallakta) is a monumental Inca site in central Bolivia. It is located in the Cochabamba Department, Carrasco Province, Pocona Municipality, approximately 130 kilometers east of Cochabamba. It was most recently excavated by Larry Coben. He believes that the site was used to perform rites for the ceremonial calendar. The site has several important structures such as the Kallanka. It was the largest single roofed room in the western hemisphere when it was built, and measures 78 by 25 meters. There's also an ushnu or a ritual platform on the site. The Torreon of Inkallaqta is also located on this site. Positioned on the western side of the site this six sided structure supposedly had calendrical or astronomical significance. There is a zigzag wall immediately north of the site which is meant to mark and protect it.

== World Heritage Status ==
This site was added to the UNESCO World Heritage Tentative List on July 1, 2003, in the Cultural category.

== Opera ==
There is also an opera called "Incallajta" in honor of these ruins. The libretto was written by Norma Méndez de Paz, the music was composed by Atiliano Auza León. It is the first Bolivian opera. The premiere was in La Paz, Bolivia in 1980. It will have its reinstatement in September 2010, in Cochabamba, in honor of the Bicentenary of this city. Gastón Paz Zegarra, a recognized Bolivian baritone represented the role of Sovereign Inca, a role that will repeat in the new version of this opera.
