= T'utura Qucha =

Lake in Bolivia

- Location within Cochabamba Location within Bolivia Location within South America
- Interactive map of T'utura Qucha
- Location: Cochabamba Department, Tiraque Province, Tiraque Municipality
- Coordinates: 17°27′00″S 65°38′20″W
- Basin countries: Bolivia
- Surface elevation: 3,758 m (12,329 ft)

T'utura Qucha (Quechua t'utura totora, qucha lake, "totora lake", hispanicized spellings Totora Khocha, Totora Kocha, Totora Qhocha, Totora Qocha, Totora Q'ocha) is a Bolivian lake located in the Cochabamba Department, Tiraque Province, Tiraque Municipality, Tiraque Canton, situated about 3,758 m high.

== See also ==
- Jatun Mayu
- Parqu Qucha
- Asiru Qucha
- Qullpa Qucha
- Wasa Mayu
