= Chullpa Ch'utu =

Mountain in Bolivia

- Location within Bolivia

Highest point
- Elevation: 3,748 m (12,297 ft)
- Coordinates: 17°33′19″S 65°34′49″W

Geography
- Location: Bolivia, Cochabamba Department
- Parent range: Andes

Chullpa Ch'utu (Quechua chullpa stone tomb, burial tower, ch'utu cone, "chullpa cone", also spelled Chullpa Chutu) is a 3,748-metre-high (12,297 ft) mountain in the Bolivian Andes. It is located in the Cochabamba Department, Arani Province, Vacas Municipality, north of Vacas. The Jatun Mayu ("big river"), a tributary of Parqu Qucha, flows along its western slope.
