= Tiraque Municipality =

- Municipality
- Location within Bolivia
- Coordinates: 17°26′S 65°39′W
- Country: Bolivia
- Department: Cochabamba Department
- Province: Tiraque Province
- Seat: Tiraque

Government
  - Mayor: Fidel Felix Salazar Bustamante (2008)
  - President: Gabriel Inturias Ríos (2007)

Population (2001)
  - Total: 35,017
  - Ethnicities: Quechuas
- Time zone: UTC-4 (BOT)

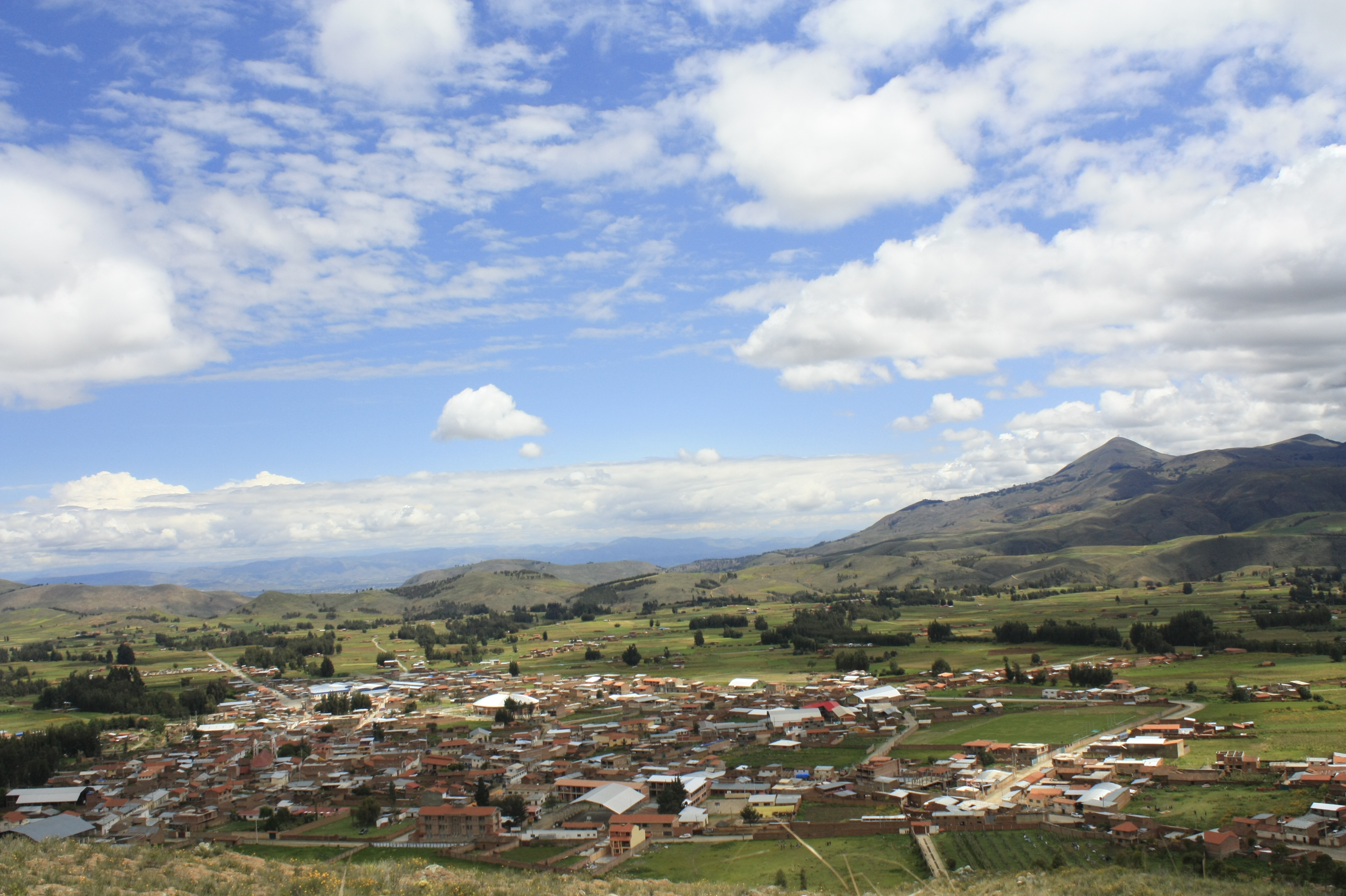
Tiraque municipality in 2018

Tiraque Municipality is the first municipal section of the Tiraque Province in the Cochabamba Department, Bolivia. At the time of census 2001 - still including Shinahota Canton (now Shinahota Municipality) - it had a population of 35,017. Its seat is Tiraque.

== Cantons ==
The municipality is divided into two cantons. They are (their seats in parentheses):

- Palca Canton - (Palca)
- Tiraque Canton - (Tiraque)

In 2009 Shinahota Canton (also named Central Busch Canton) got the status of a municipality. Now Shinahota Municipality with its seat Shinahota is the second municipal section of the Tiraque Province.

== See also ==
- Jatun Mayu
- Pila Qucha
- Sayt'u Qucha
- T'utura Qucha
- Wasa Mayu
