= Challwa Mayu, Bolivia =

Challwa Mayu
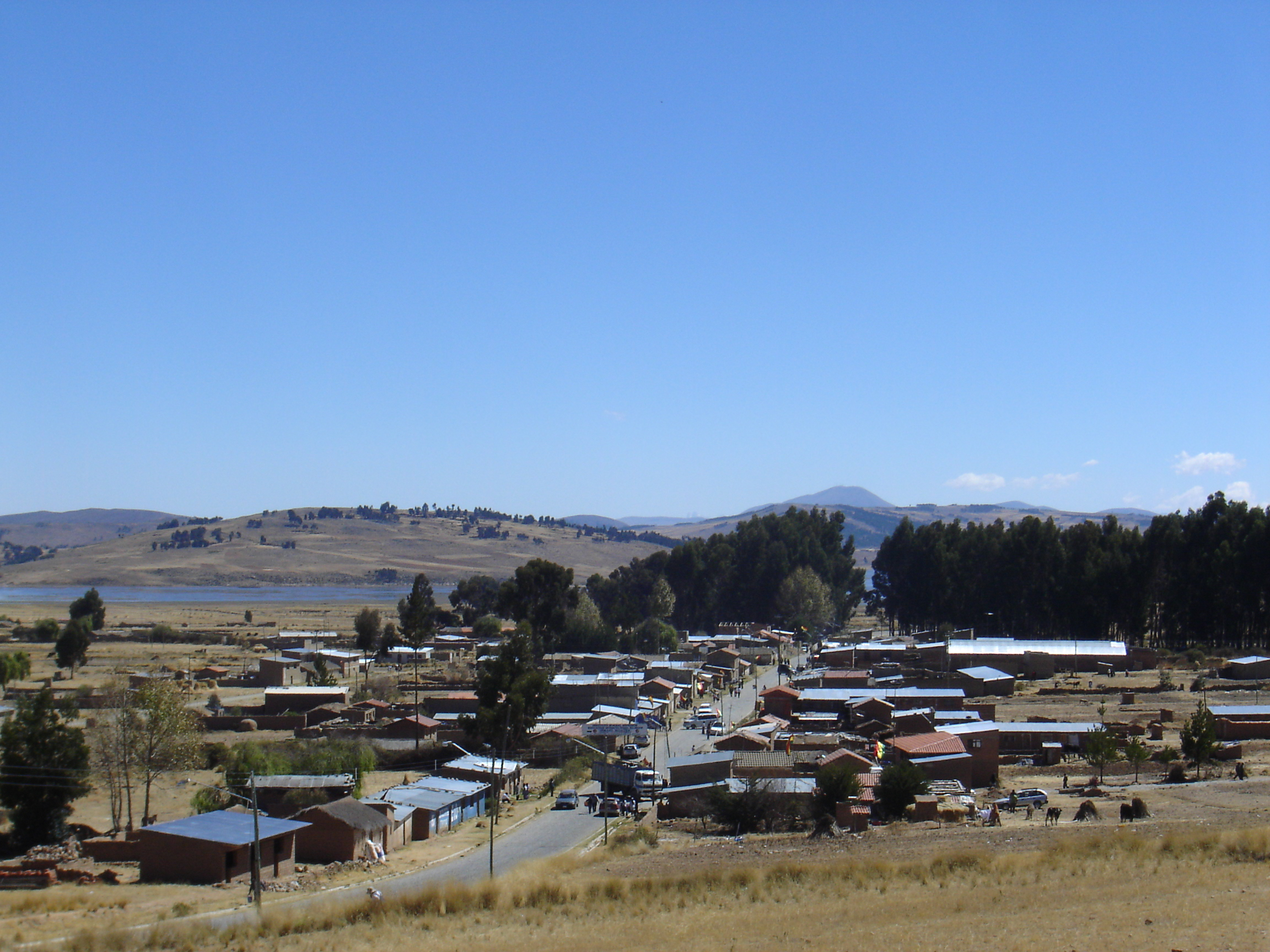

- Location within Bolivia
- Coordinates: 17°33′54″S 65°35′42″W
- Country: Bolivia
- Department: Cochabamba Department
- Province: Arani Province
- Municipality: Vacas Municipality
- Elevation: 3,474 m (11,398 ft)

Population (2001)
  - Total: 770
- Time zone: UTC-4 (BOT)

Challwa Mayu (Quechua challwa 'fish', mayu 'river', "fish river", hispaniciced spelling Challhua Mayu) is a Bolivian village in the south-east of the Cochabamba Department located in the Arani Province, Vacas Municipality, north-west of Vacas. At the time of census 2001 it had 770 inhabitants.

The Ismael Montes Teacher Training College is situated in Challwa Mayu.

== Gallery ==
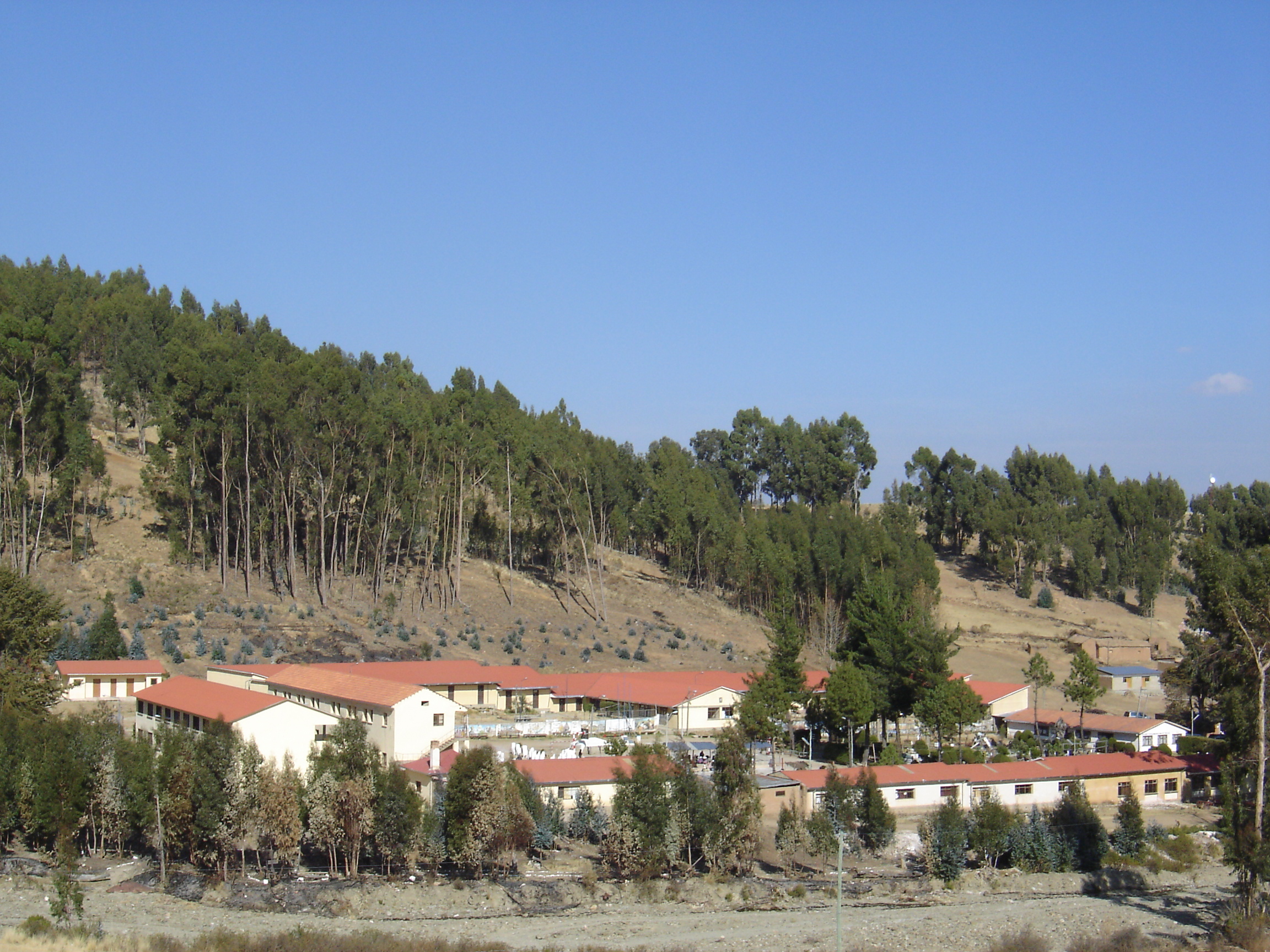
Ismael Montes Teacher Training College in Challwa Mayu

== See also ==
- Asiru Qucha
- Parqu Qucha
- Qullpa Qucha
