= Llusk'a Llusk'a =

Mountain in Bolivia

- Location within Bolivia

Highest point
- Elevation: 3,720 m (12,200 ft)
- Coordinates: 17°32′36″S 65°35′49″W

Geography
- Location: Bolivia, Cochabamba Department
- Parent range: Andes

Llusk'a Llusk'a (Quechua llusk'a polished; slippery, "very slippery", also spelled Lluskha Lluskha) is a mountain in the Bolivian Andes which reaches a height of approximately 3,720 m (12,200 ft). It is located in the Cochabamba Department, Arani Province, Vacas Municipality, northwest of Vacas. The Jatun Mayu, a tributary of Parqu Qucha, flows along its eastern and southern slopes.
