= Vacas Municipality =

Vacas Wak'as
- Municipality
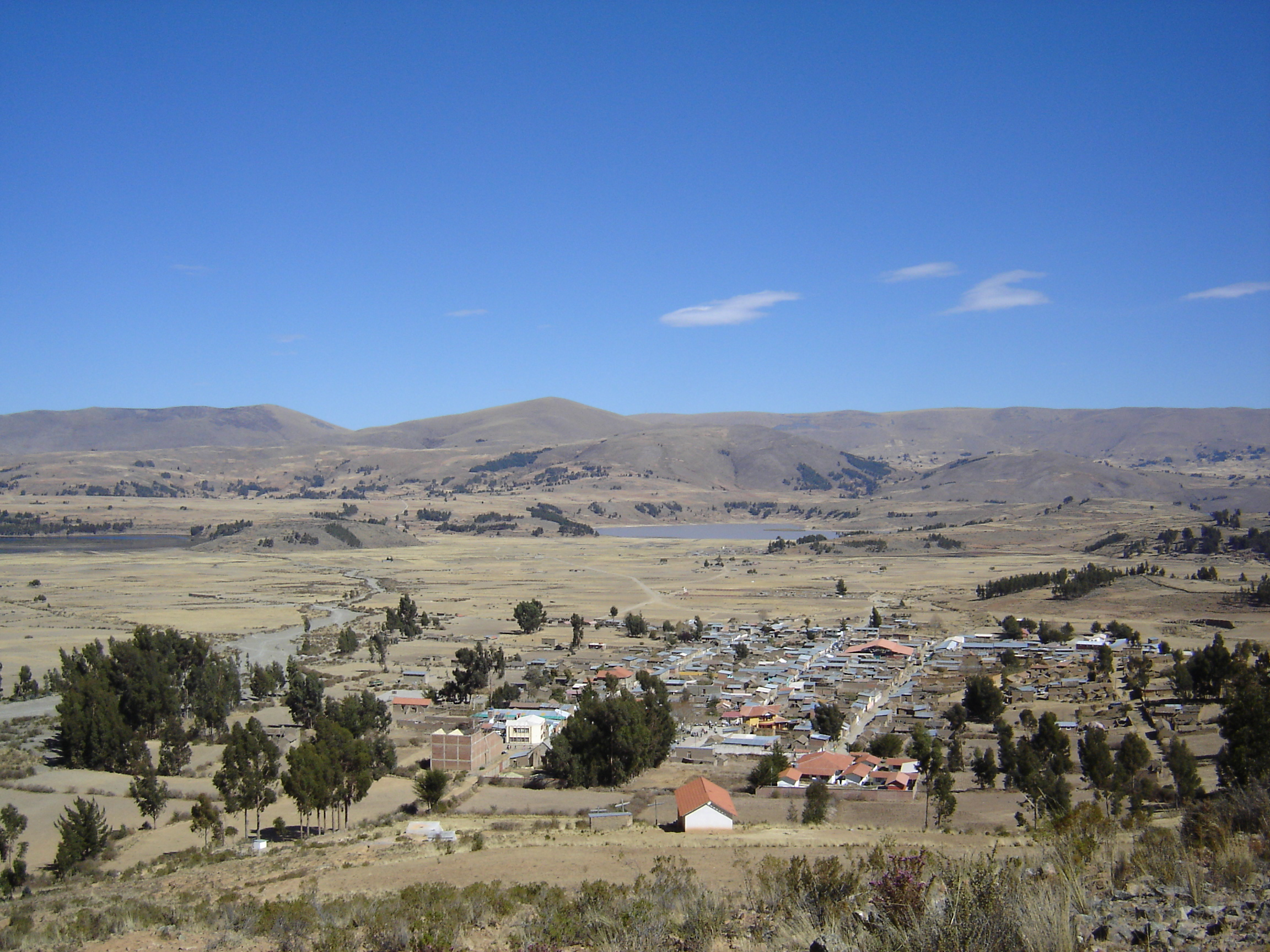
- Vacas with its lakes Pilawit'u on the left and Qullpaqucha in the center

- Flag

- Location of the Quillacollo Municipality within Bolivia
- Coordinates: 17°36′0″S 65°36′0″W
- Country: Bolivia
- Department: Cochabamba Department
- Province: Arani Province
- Cantons: 1
- Foundation: 1986
- Seat: Vacas

Government
  - Mayor: Teófilo Vásquez Santos (2010)

Area
  - Total: 129 sq mi (334 km^{2})
- Elevation: 11,150–14,500 ft (3,400–4,420 m)

Population (2001)
  - Total: 12,511
  - Density: 110/sq mi (44/km^{2})
  - Ethnicities: Quechua
- Time zone: UTC-4 (BOT)
- Area code: 30502

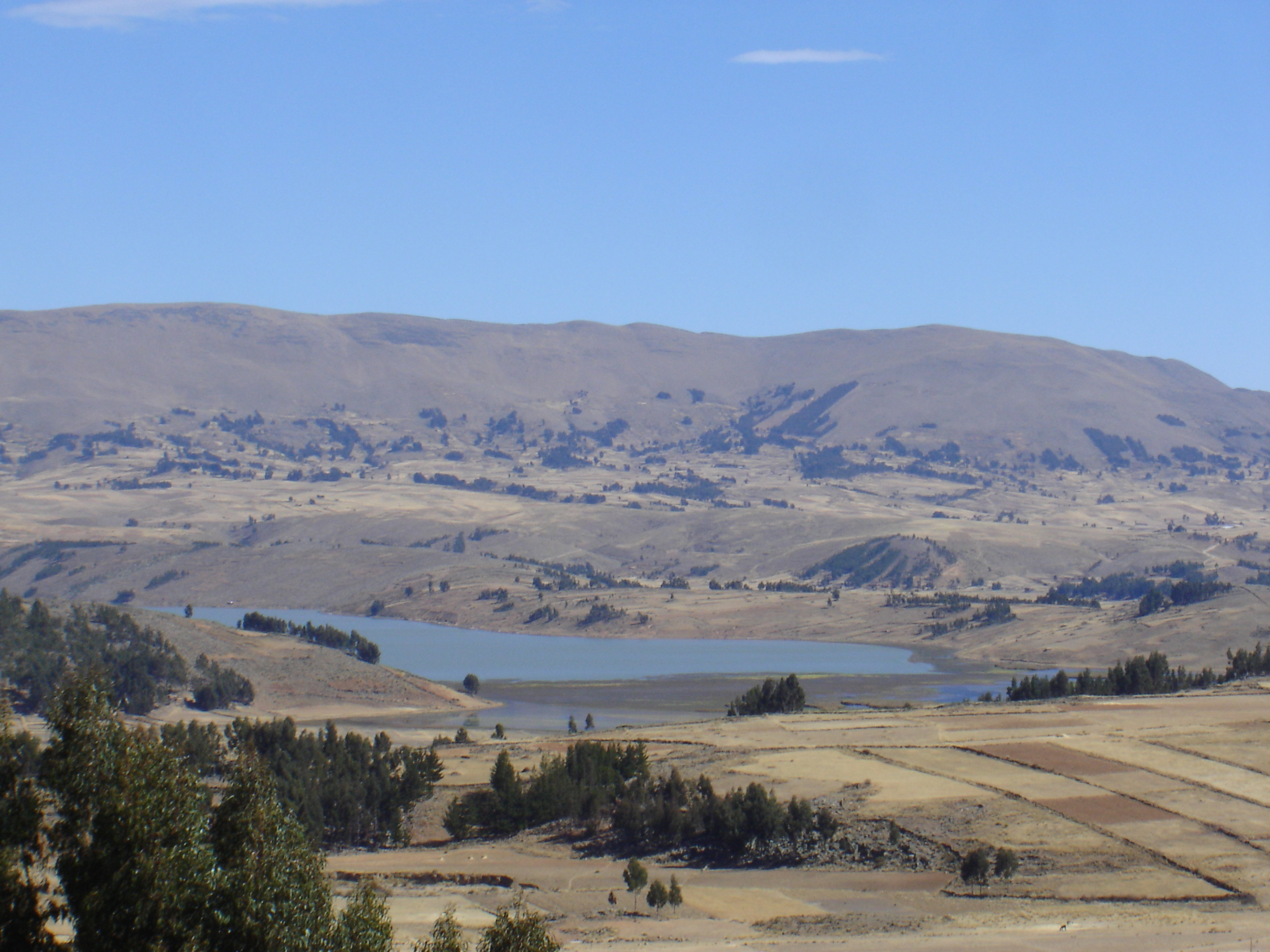
Asiruqucha

Vacas Municipality (Quechua name: Wak'as, deriving from Wak'a) is the second municipal section of the Arani Province in the Cochabamba Department in central Bolivia. Its capital is Vacas known as the "Land of the potato" (Quechua: Papaq llaqtan, Spanish: La patria de la papa). During the Inca Empire Vacas served as a tampu along the Inca road system that led to Inkallaqta and Pocona.

It is bordered to the north by the Tiraque Province, to the west by the Arani Municipality, to the south by the Mizque Province and to the southeast by the Carrasco Province, and it is sized 334 km^{2}.

== Geography ==
The municipality is known for its lakes some of which belong to the largest ones in the Cochabamba Department, Parqu Qucha, Asiru Qucha, Junt'utuyu, Qullpa Qucha, Pilawit'u and Yanatama. The Jatun Mayu is the most important tributaries of Parqu Qucha. Other smaller rivers are Phaqcha Mayu, Challwa Mayu and Q'asa Mayu. Turu Wayq'u is one of the waterfalls within the municipality.

Some of the highest mountains are Kuntur Puñuna, Khurupampa, P'allqaluma, Juch'uy Llallawa and Quturi Punta. Other mountains are listed below:

- Chawpi Urqu
- Chullpa Ch'utu
- Ikma Mayu
- Inka P'iqi
- Iskay Wasi
- Jatun Llallawa
- Jatun Punta Mayuq
- Jatun Salla
- Kuntur
- Llusk'a Llusk'a
- Mayu Urqu
- Murun Pampa
- Ñuñu Urqu
- Puka Chanka
- Pukara
- Phaqcha Urqu
- Qucha Quchayuq Urqu
- Qullpa Qucha Urqu
- Qullu Mayu
- Qutu Rumi
- Q'illu Q'asa
- Salla Punta
- Salla Q'asa
- Siqina Urqu
- T'utura Pampa
- Urqu Punta
- Wanu Wanu
- Waylla Qucha
- Yana Qucha

== Flora ==
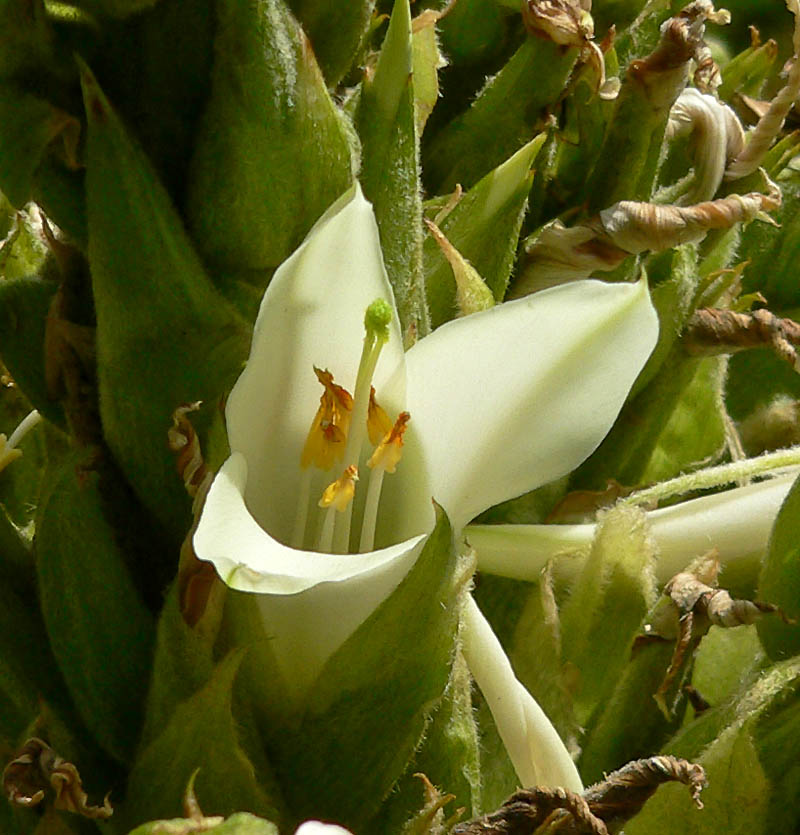
The Puya raimondii grows in Vacas. It has the longest inflorescence in the world (up to 8 m tall, depending on the environmental conditions). The image is showing part of the inflorescence with blossom.

In the surroundings of Vacas the famous Puya raimondii, a gigantic, up to 10 m high plant which is considered to be a living fossile but also an endangered species, can be found. It was the French scientist Alcide d'Orbigny (1802–1857) who was the first to discover the puya in the region of Vacas in 1830. Later the Italian biologist Antonio Raimondi (1826–1890) discovered it in the region of Chavín de Huantar during his trips to Peru. In Bolivia - apart from Vacas where these plants are spread on an area of about 1 km^{2} - the only other place to find the Puya raimondii is Comanche mountain in the Caquiaviri Canton, Pacajes Province, La Paz Department. The plants all use to grow on the eastern side of the mountains because they prefer having sun from morning until the middle of the afternoon.

The typical vegetation of this region also includes the following plants:

- Alder (Alnus acuminata)
- Andres waylla (Cestrum Parqui L’Herit, Cestrum mathewsi)
- Baccharis
- Peruvian feather grass (Stipa ichu)
- Eucalyptus
- Buddleja
- Totora (Schoenoplectus californicus ssp. tatora)
- Rebutia sp., Rebutia steinbachii
- Oca (Oxalis tuberosa)
- Polylepis
- Rattail cactus (Disocactus flagelliformis, Eriocereus tephracanthus)
- Willow (Salix sp.)

The last four thousand years of environmental and vegetation change has been recently reconstructed from the lake sediments of Pilawit'u (Lake Challacaba).

== Fauna ==
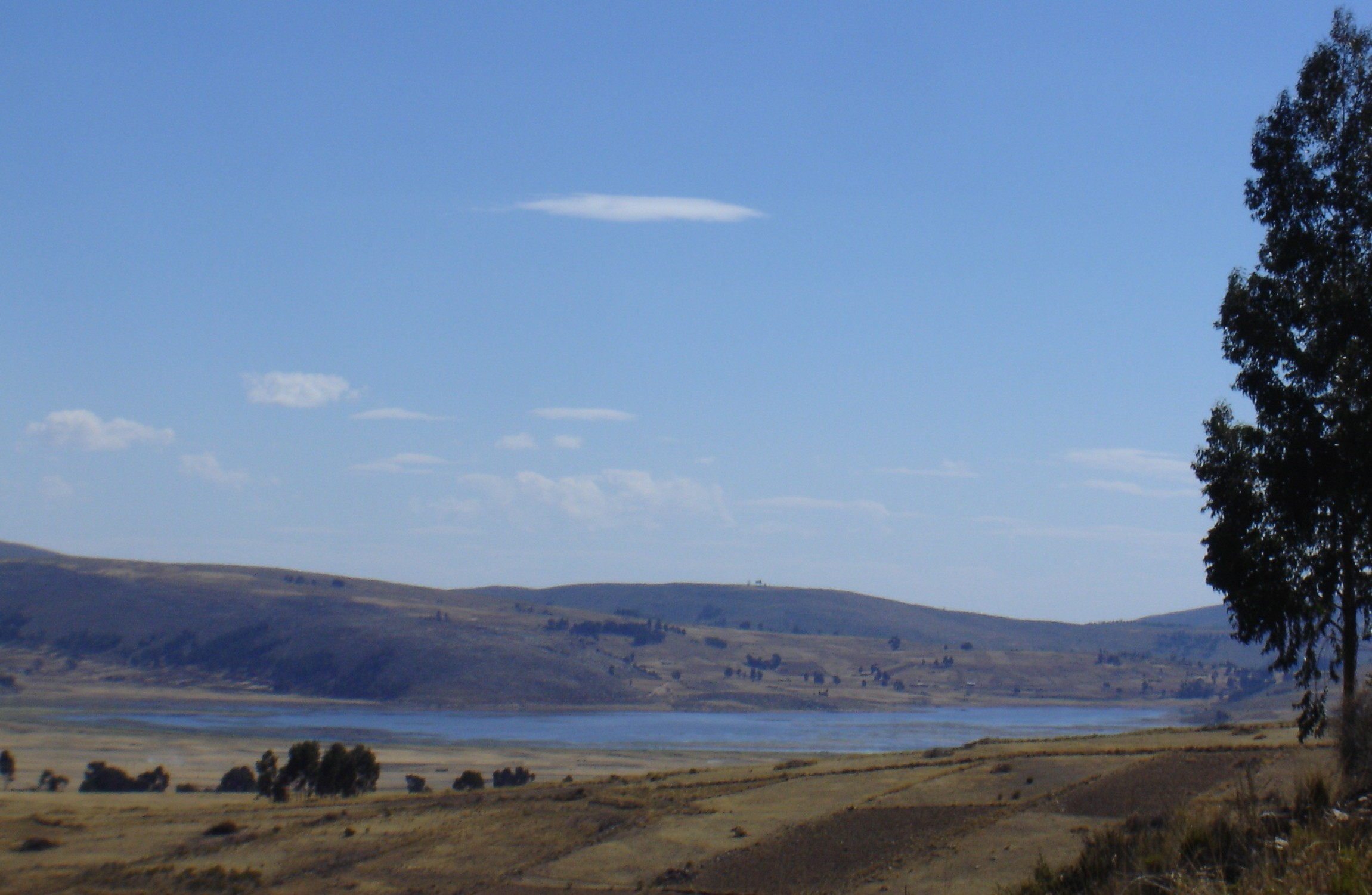
Parququcha west of Vacas

The Andean goose (Chloephaga melanoptera) is resident around the lakes in the Vacas Municipality. Viscacha, culpeo (Pseudalopex culpaeus), also known as the Andean fox, skunk, guinea pig, owl, falcon, tinamou (Tinamidae, Nothoprocta spp.) and viper are typical representatives of the fauna.

== The People ==
Vacas, located in the Cono Sur (south cone) of Cochabamba with altitudes ranging from 3,400 m to 4,420 m, has a rural character. The peasants cultivate potatoes, wheat, barley, broad bean and oat. The fields are prepared with the help of yokes of oxen. In addition, cows, sheep, pigs and hens are kept.

The people are predominantly indigenous citizens of Quechuan descent. In this place Andean customs and the Quechua culture including the usage of Quechua, a Native American language, still play an important part in daily life as well as in several other communities of the Cochabamba Department. According to census 2001 Quechua was spoken by 6,668 of the 12,511 residents of the municipality and Aymara, another Native American language used in Bolivia, by 13 residents. Today many of the Quechua people here are bilingual: They can communicate in Spanish, too. Yet the women are less accustomed to the Spanish language than the men. Many of them speak Quechua exclusively.

The latest results about the ethnic-linguistic composition of the population are as follows:

Ethnic group	%
Quechua	94.4
Aymara	0.2
Guaraní, Chiquitos, Moxos	0.0
Not indigenous	5.4
Other indigenous groups	0.1

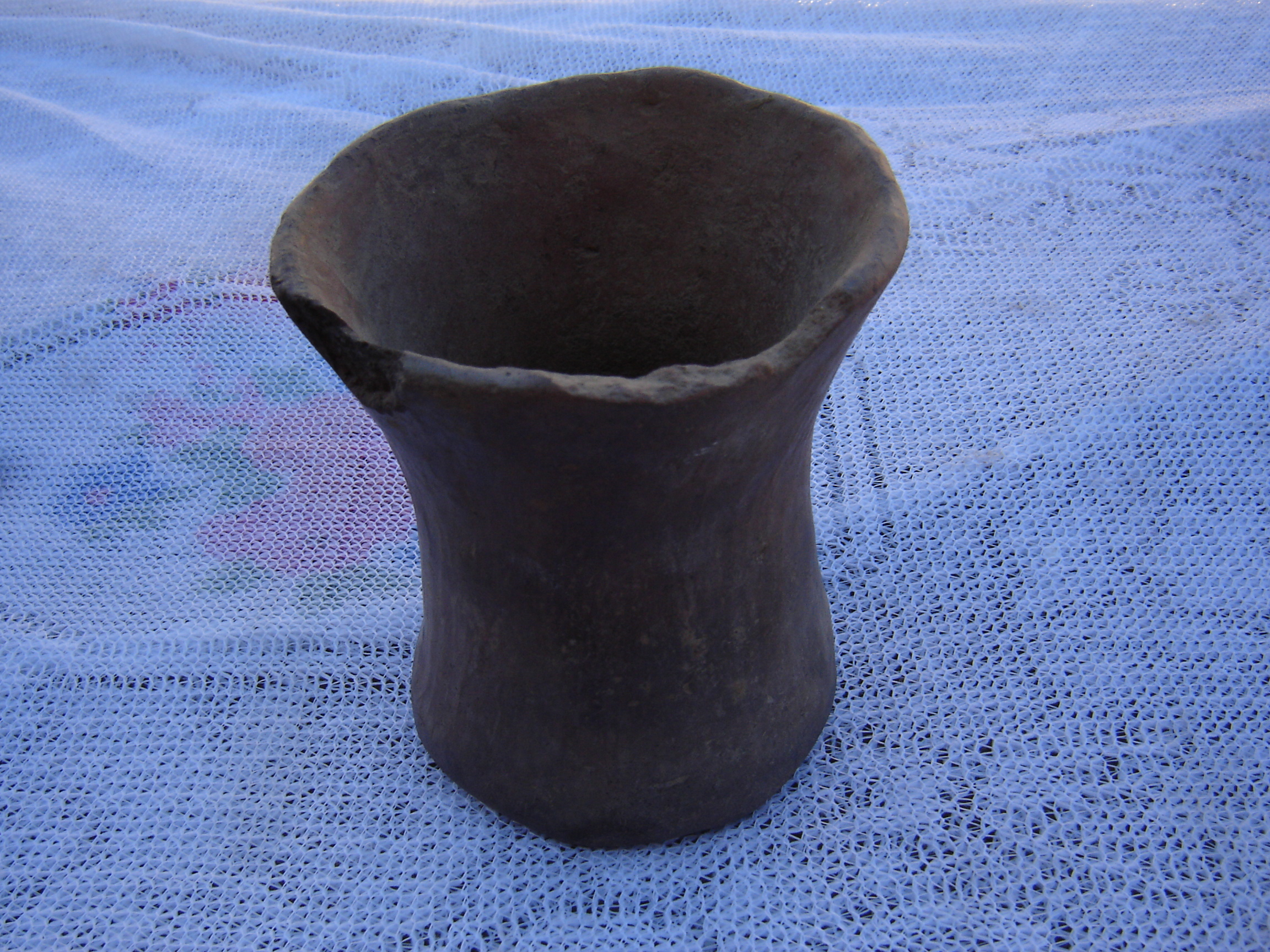
A qiru, an archeological piece of one of the ancient peoples and cultures who lived in Vacas, found during recent constructions

Language	Inhabitants
Quechua	11,662
Aymara	39
Guaraní	2
Another native	2
Spanish	4,236
Foreign	11
Only native	7,540
Native and Spanish	4,131
Only Spanish	106

Regarding medical services there are five local health offices and one medical center available in the municipality now to promote the people's quality of life. At the time of census 2001 an average life expectancy of only 52.9 years at birth was measured.

== Education ==
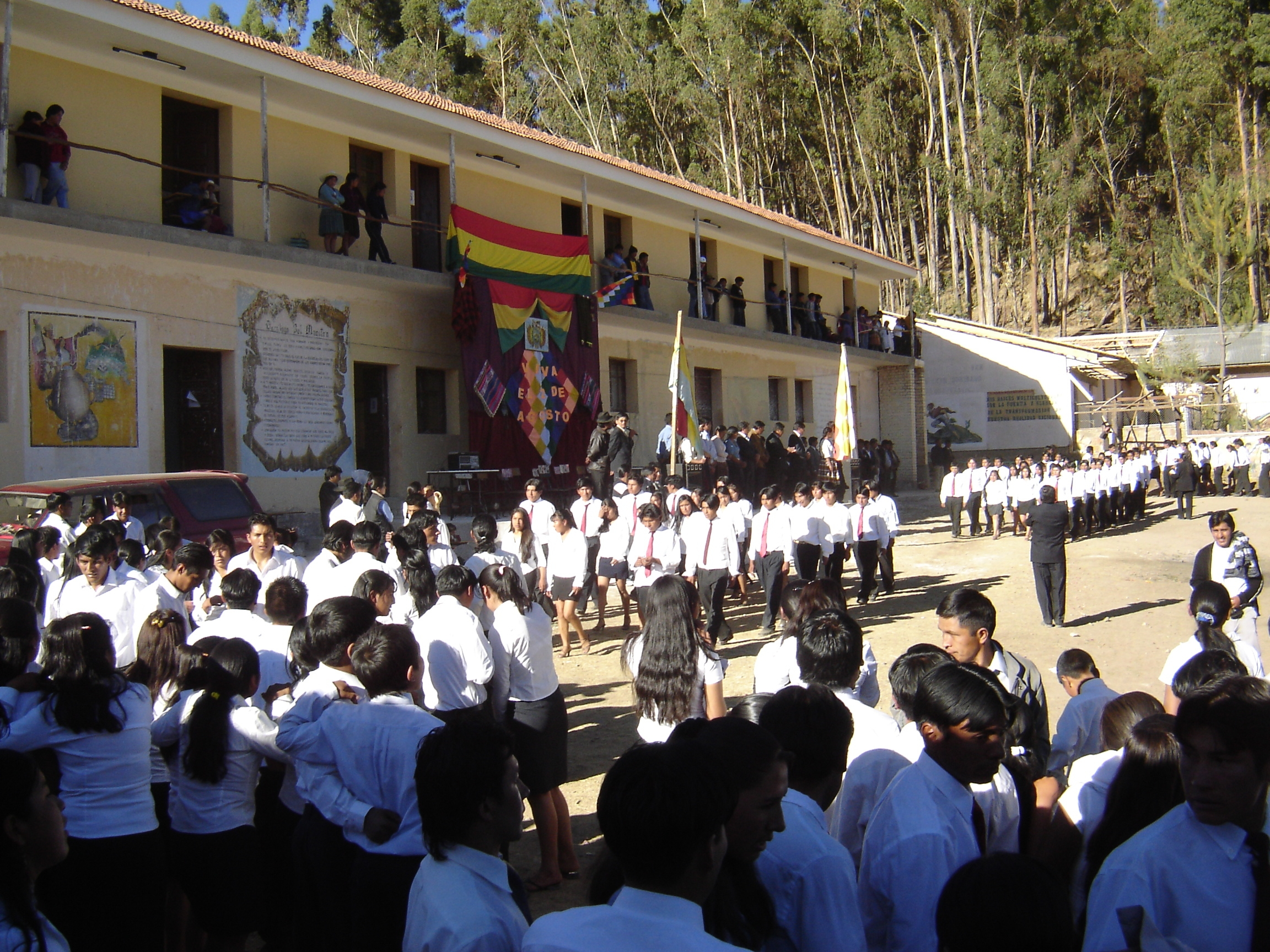
Ismael Montes Teacher Training College in Challwamayu

All types of schools are available in the Vacas Municipality. There is also an institute for higher education situated in the community of Challwa Mayu, the Ismael Montes Teacher Training College (Escuela Superior de Formación de Maestros "Ismael Montes" or ESFM "Ismael Montes"), founded in 1916 as Escuela Normal "Ismael Montes",. It is a teacher training college. The ESFM puts an emphasis on bilingual education which is practised during the students' teaching units in the schools of the nearby communities.

But some parents do not see why it is important that their children, and particularly their daughters, should attend school. The children's help is needed in the household and in the fields. For those who attend school the infrastructure of the classrooms is not always sufficient and the distances between house and school demand long and arduous walks.

Illiteracy is still high, especially among women. In 2001 54.5% of the women being 19 years old and more were illiterate and 19.8% of the men. On an average the inhabitants of the Vacas Municipality being 19 years old and more have attended school for 3.23 years (women: 2.24 years, men: 4.38 years).

The number of pupils attending the different types of schools is shown below.

Year	Initial	Primary school	Secondary school	Total
2002	184	3,284	463	3,931
2003	145	3.157	515	3,817
2004	115	2,951	550	3,616
2005	127	2,881	639	3,647
2006	109	2,839	688	3,636
2007	91	2,401	718	3,210

== Radio Chiwalaki ==
The idea of a farmers' radio awoke in 1987. The peasants themselves demanded more information, education and intercommunication. After three years, on September 1, 1990, Radio Chiwalaki was inaugurated in the rural community of Misuk’ani, about two kilometres far from Vacas. The 1,000 watt transmission on medium wave allows a distribution of news to various neighbouring municipalities and provinces. So even the people in the Arani Province, Tiraque Province, Pocona Municipality and Alalay Municipality can benefit from it. The programs are preferably broadcast in the Quechua language because they are meant for the rural population. Presently Radio Chiwakali is on the air for three hours in the morning and three hours in the afternoon.

== History ==
Vacas is one of the rural Bolivian communities of early rebellion. The forming of trade unions began on April 3, 1936 when the colonos (workers with an intermediate status between slavery and freedom) of the hacienda of Santa Clara monastery demanded to administer that land directly, whereas the administration had been in the hands of a priest until that moment. This was quite a radical proposal at that period of time because the colonos neither had the right to organize themselves nor to administer land. Nevertheless, the Trade Union of Agrarian Workers of Vacas (Sindicato de Trabajadores Agrarios de Vacas) was actually founded on December 20, 1936. It was the second trade union in the Cochabamba Department.

In 1832 the Vacas Canton was created being part of the Mizque Province. In 1986 it became the second municipal section of the Arani Province.

== Festivities ==
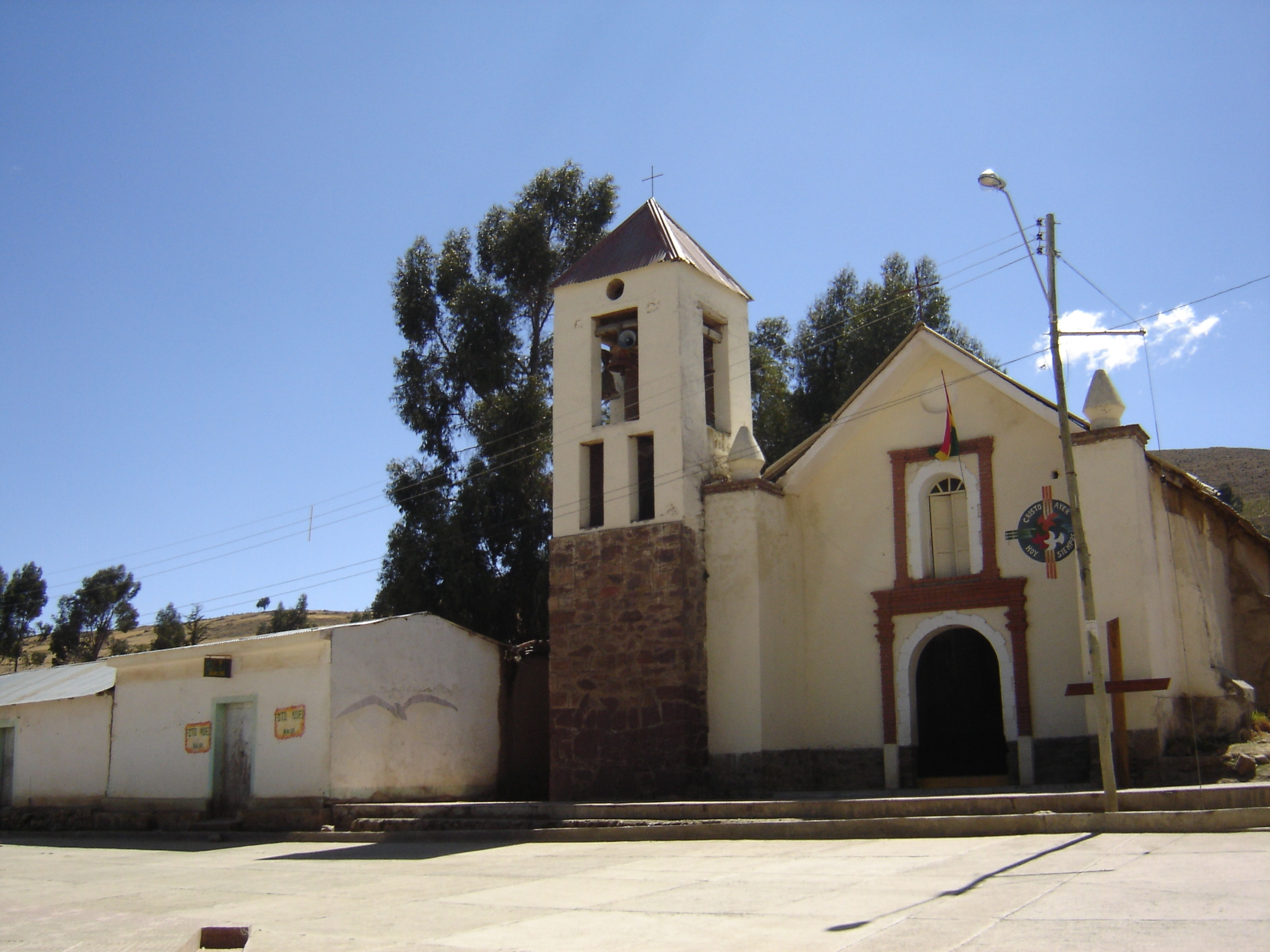
Saint Barbara church in Vacas

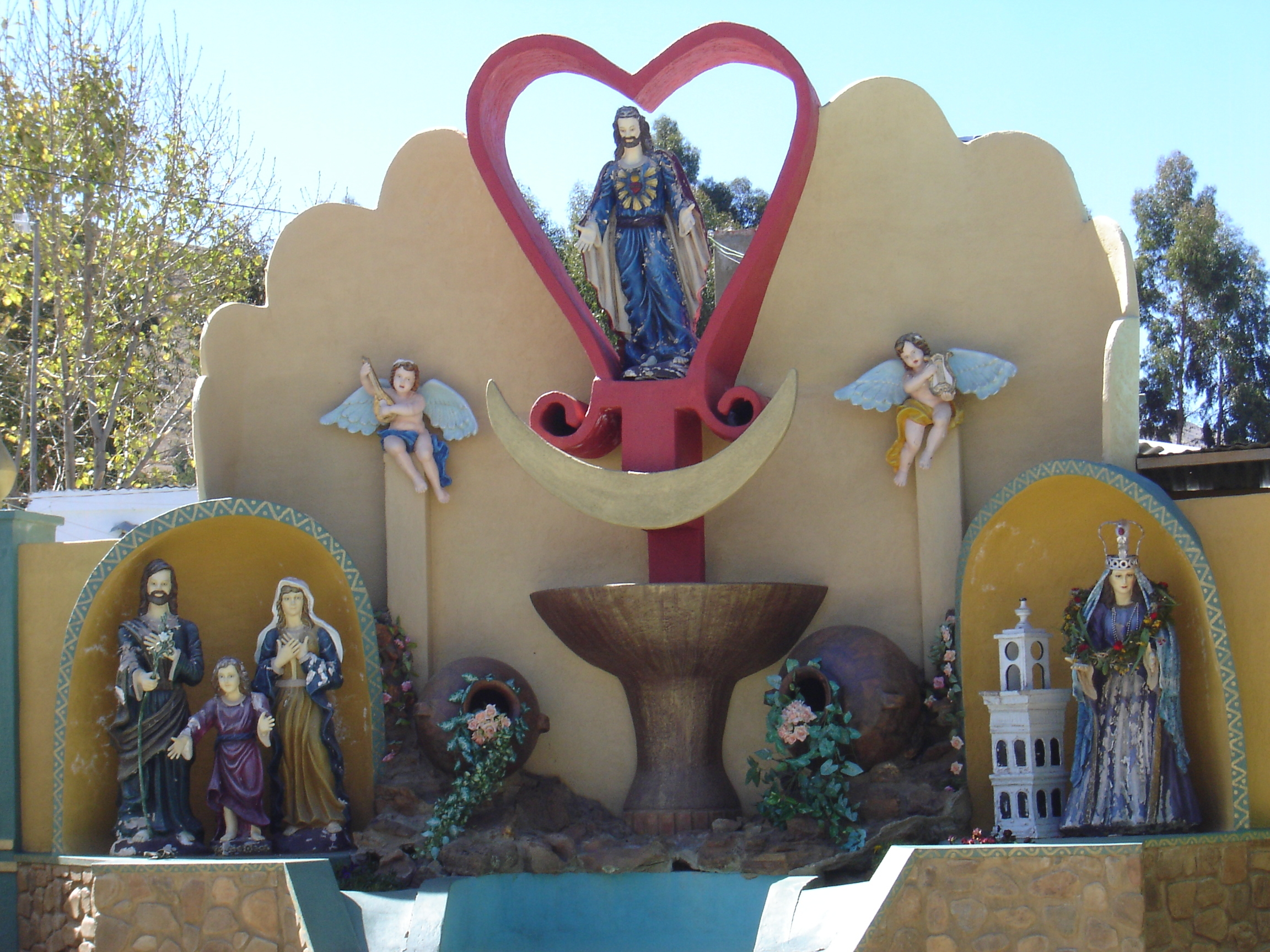
The grotto of the kindergarten Sagrado Corazón de Jesús (Holy Heart of Jesus) at the central place Plaza 4 de diciembre in Vacas. In the upper part there is an image of the Holy Heart of Jesus, accompanied by two angels. On the left there is an image of the Holy Family, Jesus, Mary and Joseph, and on the right there is an image of Saint Barbara, patron saint of Vacas

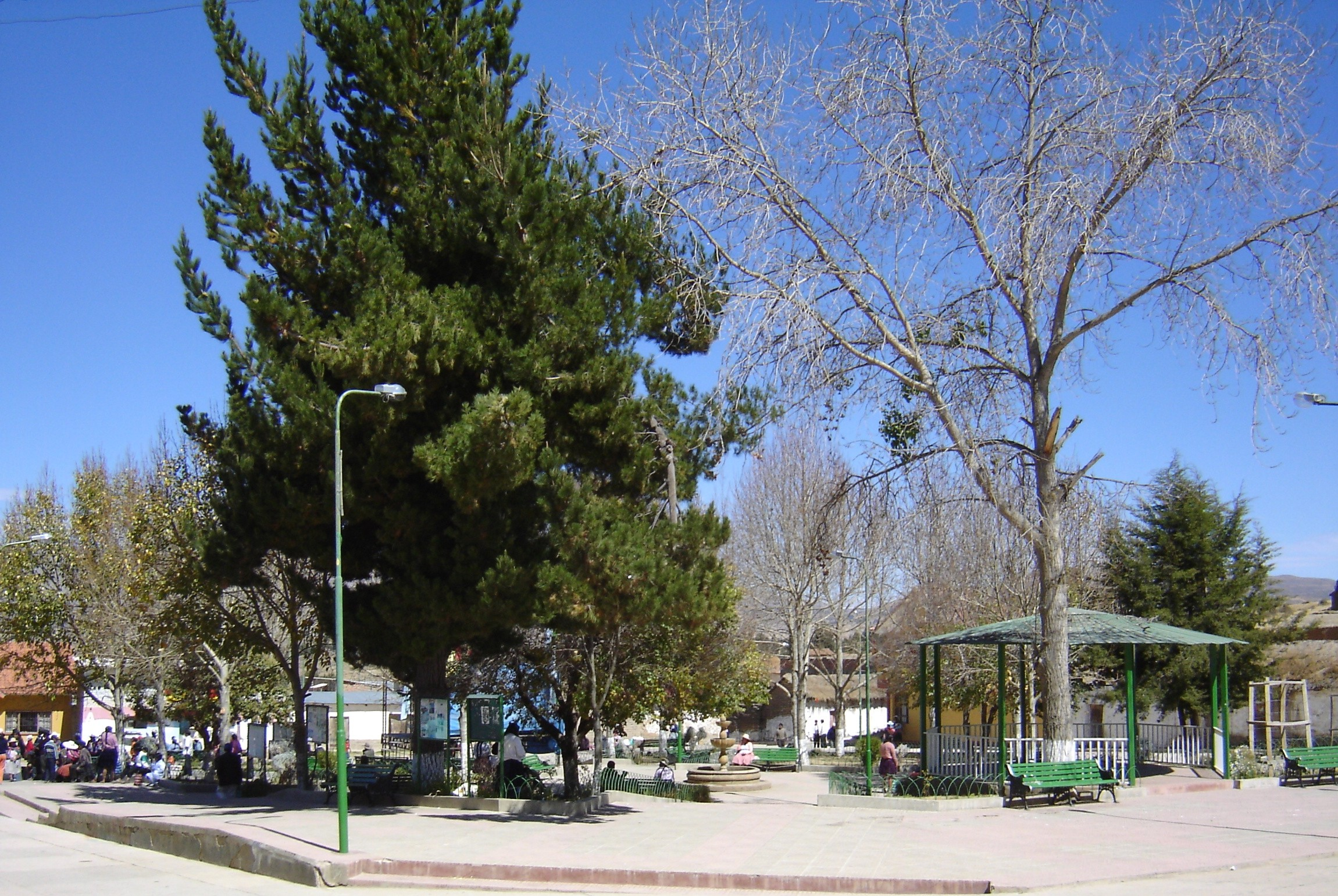
Vacas, Plaza 4 de diciembre (Place of December 4th)

- February or March: Carnival, Takipayanakus (variable date)
- April: Fish, potato and crafts fair in Vacas (second or third Sunday).
- May 4: Santa Vera Cruz Tatala in Vacas and Paredones
- May 14: Saint Isidore in Misuk'ani and Paredones
- May or June: Corpus Christi in Vacas
- June 29: Saint Peter in Vacas
- July 16: Our Lady of Mount Carmel, the patron saint of Bolivia, in Vacas
- August 2: Peasant Day in Challwa Mayu and Ch'alla Q'awa
- August 3: Our Lady of Copacabana in Challwa Mayu
- October 15: Anniversary of Vacas Municipality
- November 2: All Souls' Day (All Saints), Wayllunk'as.
- December 4: Saint Barbara, Anniversary of Vacas.

Every year on December 4, combined with a couple of activities, the population of Vacas celebrates its anniversary of foundation and the feast of its patron Saint Barbara whose image is venerated with much devotion by the residents and people from abroad. The pilgrims come to worship and to ask their patron for little favours, especially for rain and the protection from lightning.

There is a traditional tale telling that many years ago Saint Barbara appeared as a shepherdess on the shore of Qucha Quchita. The people who arrived at this place attracted by the incident found a beautiful image of the saint which they carried to the village of Vacas. Because of this event Vacas was founded officially as Santa Bárbara de Bacas in the middle of the 17th century.

== Villages ==
- Challwamayu
- Chiwalaki
- Ch'akiqucha
- Ch'allaqawa
- Junt'utuyu
- Kañara
- Misuk'ani
- Muyuqch'ipa
- Parirun
- Parququcha
- Pilawit'u
- Phaqchapata
- P'isqumayu
- Qullpaqucha
- Rudiyu
- Sapillikha
- Tuturapampa
- Wak'as
- Yanatama
- Yiwakancha
- Waynillu

== Notable residents ==
- Pablo Fernández, composer, born in Vacas on June 29, 1954
- Ronald Rodríguez Clavijo, classical guitar soloist, born in Vacas on September 10, 1959
- Freddy Veizaga Siles, musician, born in Vacas
- Juan Carlos Rodriguez Clavijo, musician, born in Vacas on November 22, 1963, member of different folklore groups like: Inkallajta, Siembra, Kharkas, Proyección and other
- Natividad Betty Veizaga Siles, composer, singer and musician, born in Vacas on December 25, 1957, member of the group Pukaj Wayra since 1977

== Literature ==
- A Revolution for our Rights - Indigenous Struggles for Land and Justice in Bolivia, 1880–1952, Excerpt online: page 72 ff
