= Veizaga =

Veizaga or Véizaga is a surname. Notable people with the surname include:

- Betty Veizaga (born 1957), Bolivian folk musician
- Benedicto Godoy Véizaga (born 1924), Bolivian footballer
- Cielo Veizaga (born 2001), Bolivian footballer and politician
- Wálter Veizaga (born 1988), Bolivian footballer
