= Inka P'iqi =

Mountain in Bolivia

- Location within Bolivia

Highest point
- Elevation: 4,110 m (13,480 ft)
- Coordinates: 17°41′39″S 65°34′53″W

Geography
- Location: Bolivia, Cochabamba Department
- Parent range: Andes

Inka P'iqi (Aymara p'iqi, p'iq'iña, phiq'i, phiq'iña head, Inka Inca, "Inca head", also spelled Inca Pekhe) is a 4,110-metre-high (13,480 ft) mountain in the Bolivian Andes. It is located in the Cochabamba Department, on the border of the Arani Province, Vacas Municipality, and the Mizque Province, Alalay Municipality. Inka P'iqi lies southwest of Jatun Llallawa and south of Juch'uy Llallawa.
