= Q'illu Q'asa (disambiguation) =

Q'illu Q'asa (Quechua q'illu yellow, q'asa mountain pass, "yellow mountain pass", also spelled Ccello Ccasa, Jello Jasa, Jellojasa, Khellu Khasa, Quellu Casa, Quellojasa) may refer to:

- Q'illu Q'asa, a mountain in the Apurímac Region, Peru
- Q'illu Q'asa (Bolivia), a mountain in the Potosí Department, Bolivia
- Q'illu Q'asa (Cochabamba), a mountain in the Cochabamba Department, Bolivia
