= Sayt'u Qucha (Tiraque) =

Lake in Bolivia

- Location within Cochabamba Location within Bolivia Location within South America
- Interactive map of Sayt'u Qucha
- Location: Cochabamba Department, Tiraque Province, Tiraque Municipality
- Coordinates: 17°22′53″S 65°39′28″W
- Basin countries: Bolivia
- Surface elevation: 4,004 m (13,136 ft)

Sayt'u Qucha (Quechua sayt'u long and narrow, rectangular, qucha lake, "long and narrow lake", hispanicized spellings Saythu Khocha, Saytu Khocha, Saytu Qhocha) is a Bolivian lake located in the Cochabamba Department, Tiraque Province, Tiraque Municipality, Tiraque Canton situated about 4,004 m high.
