= Juch'uy Llallawa =

Mountain in Bolivia

- Location within Bolivia

Highest point
- Elevation: 4,122 m (13,524 ft)
- Coordinates: 17°39′19″S 65°34′48″W

Geography
- Location: Bolivia, Cochabamba Department, Arani Province
- Parent range: Andes

Juch'uy Llallawa (Quechua juch'uy small, llallawa the god of seed-time during the Inca period, "little Llallawa", Hispanicized spelling Juchuy Llallagua) is a 4,122-metre-high (13,524 ft) mountain in the Bolivian Andes. It is located in the Cochabamba Department, Arani Province, Vacas Municipality. Juch'uy Llallawa lies south-east of the lake Asiru Qucha, beside the mountain Jatun Llallawa ("big Llallawa").
