= Ismael Montes Teacher Training College =

Ismael Montes Teacher Training College Escuela Superior de Formación de Maestros "Ismael Montes"
- Ismael Montes Jatun Yachay Wasi Yachachiqkunaq Wakichikunankupaq
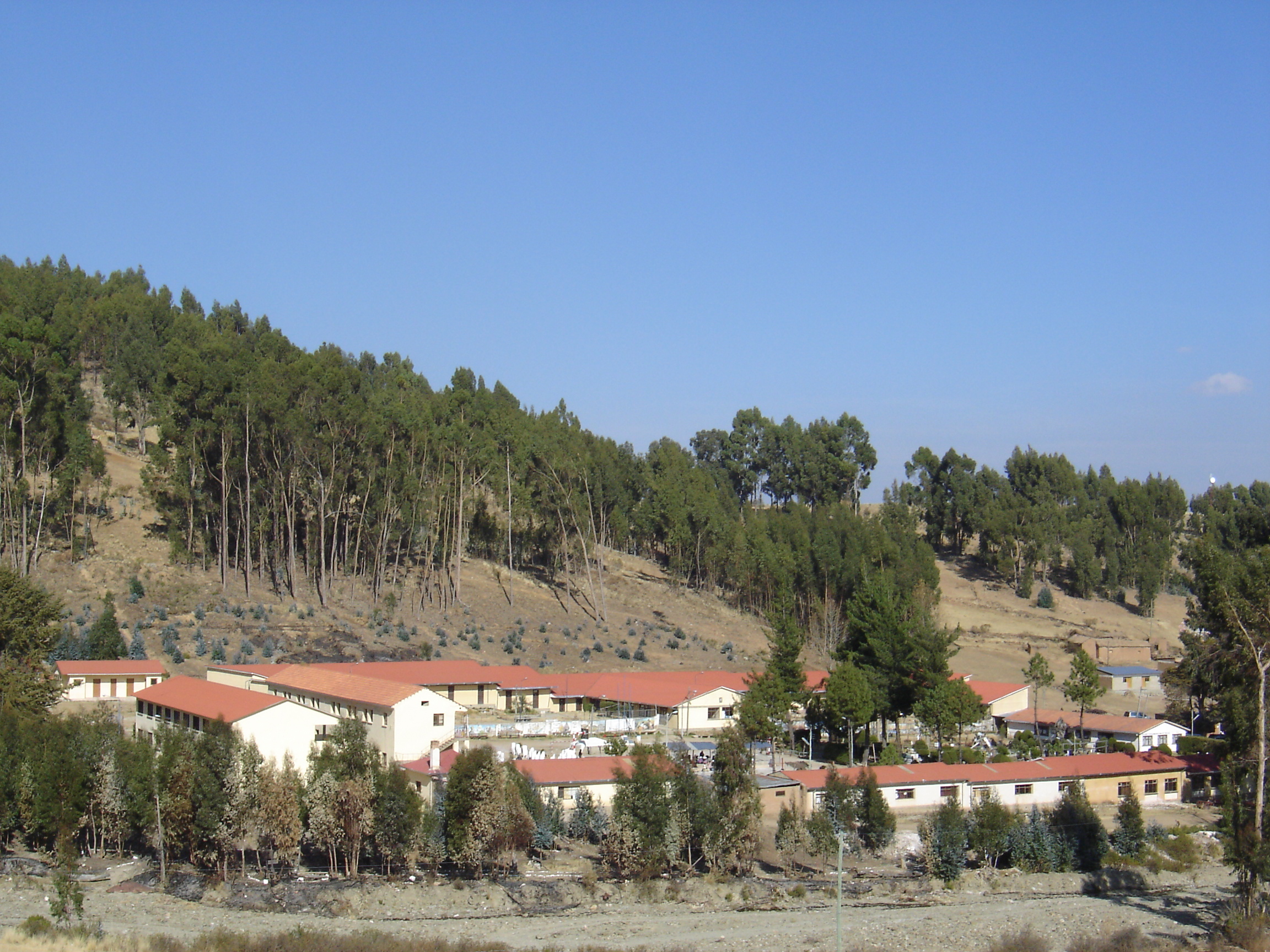
- Ismael Montes Teacher Training College as seen from the west
- Established: February 18, 1916
- Rector: Lic. Calixto Borda
- Students: about 1,500
- Location: Challwa Mayu, Cochabamba Department, Bolivia
- Campus: Rural
- Colours: Red and White
- Website: www.normalvacas.edu.bo

The Ismael Montes Teacher Training College (Escuela Superior de Formación de Maestros "Ismael Montes" or ESFM "Ismael Montes") is an institution of public higher education under the authority of the Ministry of Education of Bolivia, also known as Normal de Vacas.

Its facilities are situated in Challwa Mayu, Vacas Municipality, Arani Province, Cochabamba Department, about 1 km north west of Vacas.

One distinctive feature of this institution is that it prepares bilingual, Quechua and Spanish speaking teachers, for primary as well as for secondary education.

== See also ==
- Ismael Montes
