= Phaqcha Mayu =

Bolivian river

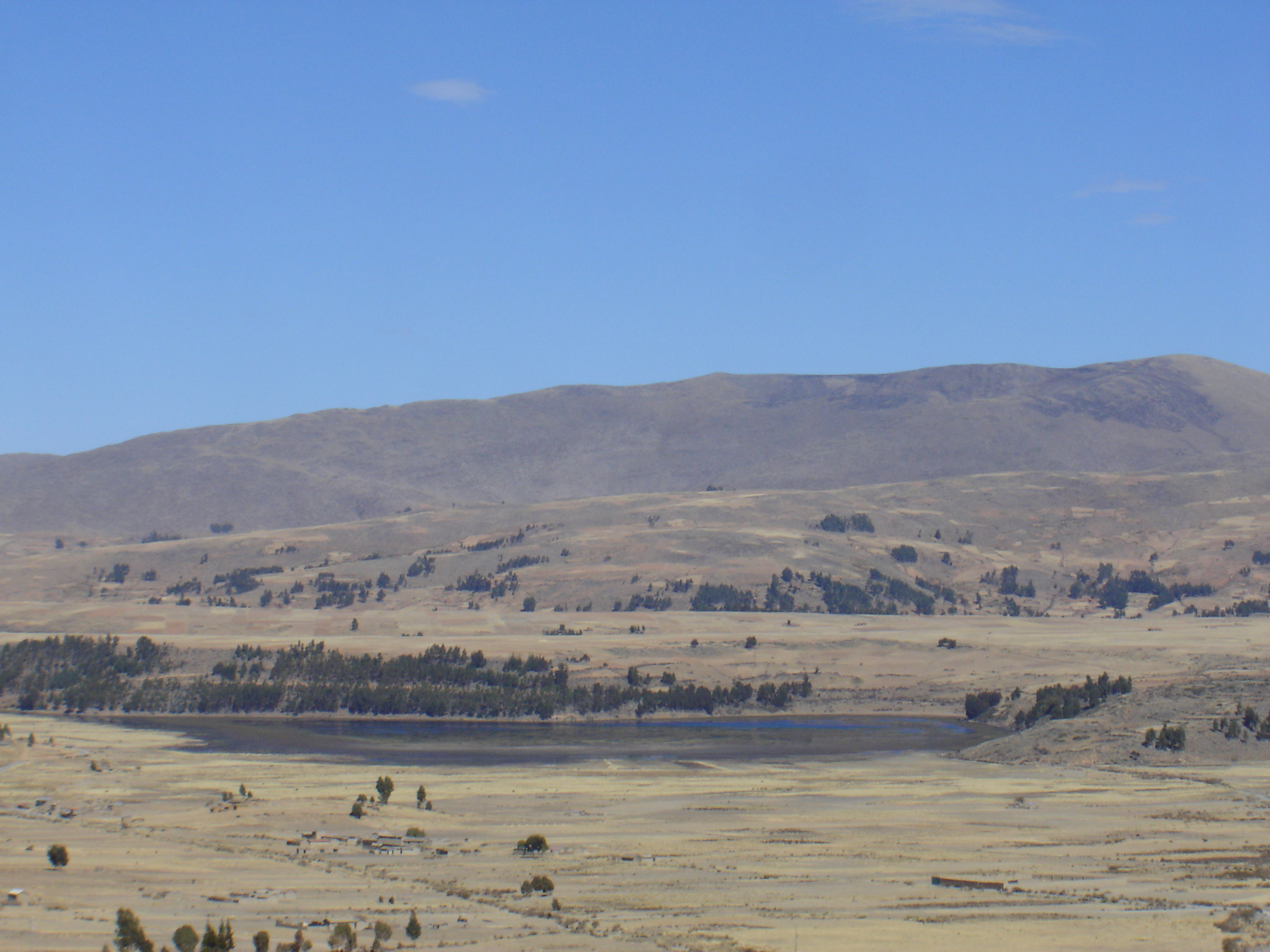
- Pilawit'u lake. From here Phaqcha Mayu flows to the southeast.

Location
- Country: Bolivia
- Region: Cochabamba Department
- Municipality: Arani Province, Carrasco Province

Phaqcha Mayu (Quechua phaqcha waterfall, mayu river, "waterfall river", also spelled Pajcha Mayu) is a Bolivian river in the Cochabamba Department, Arani Province, Vacas Municipality, and in the Carrasco Province, Pocona Municipality. It originates near Vacas. From the lake Pilawit'u it flows southeast. Downstream, south of Pocona, it is also known under the name Ch'akiri.

== See also ==
- List of rivers of Bolivia
