= Wasa Mayu =

Location
- Country: Bolivia
- Region: Cochabamba Department
- Municipality: Tiraque Province, Carrasco Province

Physical characteristics
- Mouth: Ivirizu River

Wasa Mayu (Quechua wasa the human back or the back of an animal, mayu river, "back river" Hispanicized spelling Huasa Mayu) is a Bolivian river in the Cochabamba Department, Tiraque Province, Tiraque Municipality and in the Carrasco Province. It is a left tributary of Ivirizu River, the most important affluent of San Matéo River.

== See also ==
- List of rivers of Bolivia
