= Pila Qucha =

Lake in Bolivia

- Location within Cochabamba Location within Bolivia Location within South America
- Interactive map of Pila Qucha
- Location: Cochabamba Department, Tiraque Province, Tiraque Municipality
- Coordinates: 17°25′30″S 65°33′50″W
- Basin countries: Bolivia
- Surface elevation: 4,019 m (13,186 ft)

Pila Qucha (Quechua pila hose qucha lake, "hose lake", hispanicized spellings Pila Cocha, Pila Khocha, Pilakhocha) is a Bolivian lake located in the Cochabamba Department, Tiraque Province, Tiraque Municipality, Tiraque Canton situated about 4,019 m high.
