= Jatun Salla =

Mountain in Bolivia

- Location within Bolivia

Highest point
- Elevation: 3,956 m (12,979 ft)
- Coordinates: 17°33′23″S 65°27′43″W

Geography
- Location: Bolivia, Cochabamba Department
- Parent range: Andes

Jatun Salla (Quechua jatun big, salla large cliff or gravel, "big cliff (or gravel)") is a 3,956-metre-high (12,979 ft) mountain in the Bolivian Andes. It is located in the Cochabamba Department, at the border of the Arani Province, Vacas Municipality, and the Carrasco Province, Pocona Municipality.
