= Pilawit'u =

Lake in Bolivia

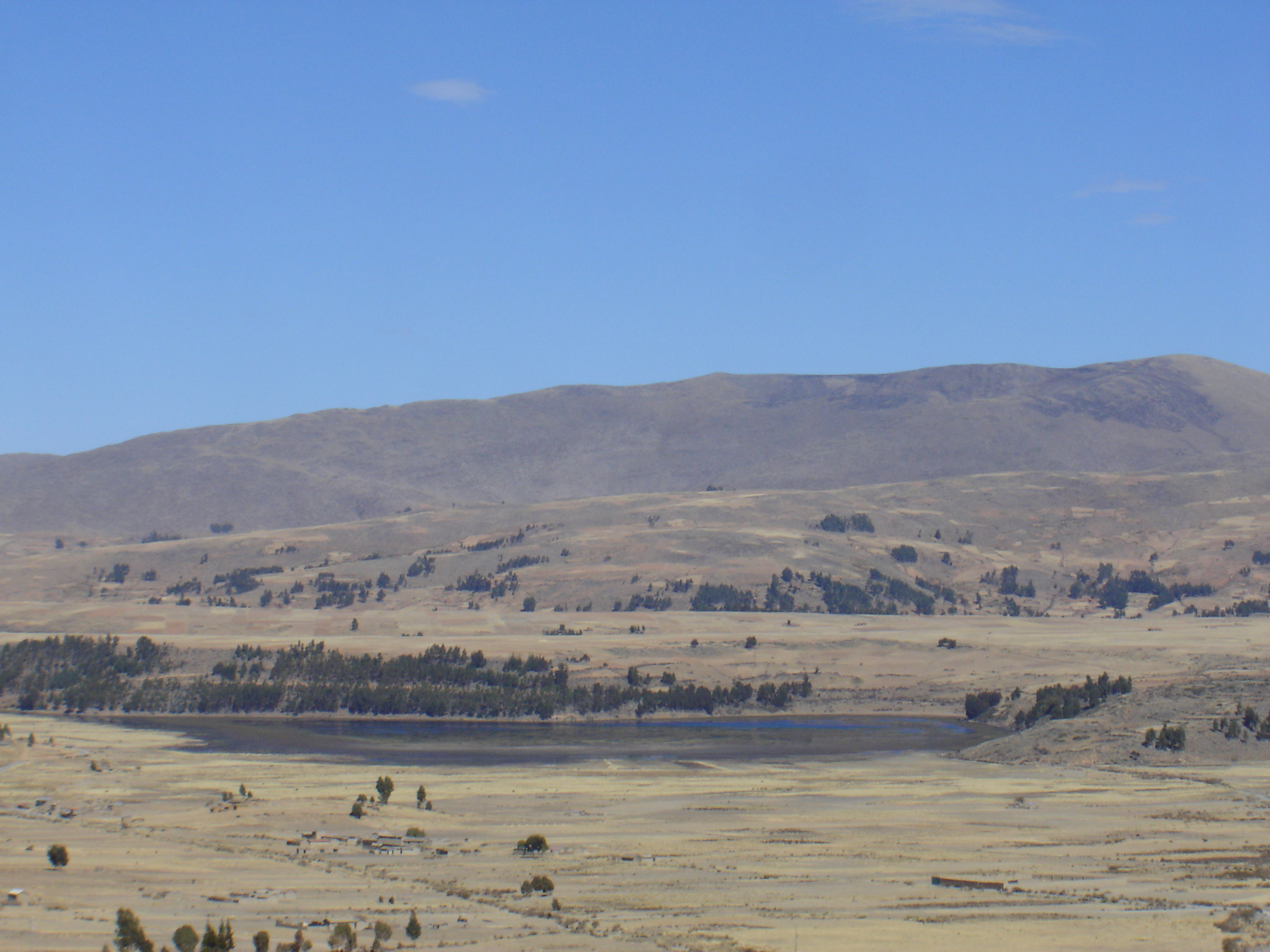

- Location within Cochabamba Location within Bolivia Location within South America
- Interactive map of Pilawit'u
- Location: Cono Sur, Vacas Municipality, Cochabamba Department, Arani Province
- Coordinates: 17°35′50″S 65°34′10″W
- Basin countries: Bolivia
- Surface area: 2.0 km^{2} (0.77 sq mi)
- Surface elevation: 3,407 m (11,178 ft)
- Settlements: Vacas, Pilawit'u, Parirun

Pilawit'u is a Bolivian lake located in Vacas Municipality, Arani Province, Cochabamba Department. The last four thousand years of environmental and vegetation change has been recently reconstructed from the lake sediments of Pilawit'u (Lake Challacaba)

The main tributaries of Pilawit'u are Chiwalaki, Challa Q'awa, Muña Mayu and Phaqcha Pata Mayu whose tributaries are T'utura Mayu, Phaqcha Pata and the Phaqcha River. Its surface area is 2.0 km^{2} (0.77 sq mi).

== See also ==
- Asiru Qucha
- Parqu Qucha
- Phaqcha Mayu
- Qullpa Qucha
