= Shinahota Municipality =

Coordinates: 17°16′S 65°30′W

- Municipality
- Interactive map of Shinahota Municipality
- Country: Bolivia
- Department: Cochabamba Department
- Province: Tiraque Province
- Foundation: July 4, 2009
- Seat: Shinahota

Government
  - Mayor: Rimer Ágreda
- Time zone: UTC-4 (BOT)

Shinahota Municipality (also sometimes spelled Sinahota or Shinaota) is the second municipal section of the Tiraque Province in the Cochabamba Department in central Bolivia. Its seat Shinahota had 4,291 inhabitants at the time of census 2001.
