= Jatun Mayu (Tiraque) =

- Etymology: Quechua

Location
- Country: Bolivia
- Region: Cochabamba Department, Tiraque Province, Arani Province

Jatun Mayu (Quechua hatun, jatun big, great, mayu river, "great river") is a Bolivian river in the Cochabamba Department, Tiraque Province, Tiraque Municipality and south of it in the Arani Province, Vacas Municipality. It is one of the most important tributaries of Parqu Qucha, a lake north west of Vacas. It originates north east of Punata. It changes its directions from north west to north, then near Palca it abruptly turns to the south east.
