= Shinahota =

Shinahota Shinahuta
- Town
- Location within Bolivia
- Coordinates: 17°0′S 65°15′W
- Country: Bolivia
- Department: Cochabamba Department
- Province: Tiraque Province
- Municipality: Shinahota Municipality
- Elevation: 876 ft (267 m)

Population (2001)
  - Total: 4,291
- Time zone: UTC-4 (BOT)

Shinahota, Shinahuta (also sometimes spelled Sinahota or Shinaota) is a small town in the Cochabamba Department in central Bolivia. It is the seat of the Shinahota Municipality, the second municipal section of the Tiraque Province.

== See also ==
- Carrasco National Park
