= Q'illu Q'asa (Cochabamba) =

Mountain in Bolivia

Qucha Quchayuq Urqu
- Location within Bolivia

Highest point
- Elevation: 4,200 m (13,800 ft)
- Coordinates: 17°33′09″S 65°33′01″W

Geography
- Location: Bolivia, Cochabamba Department
- Parent range: Andes

Q'illu Q'asa (Quechua q'illu yellow, q'asa mountain pass, "yellow mountain pass", also spelled Khellu Khasa) is a mountain in the Bolivian Andes which reaches a height of approximately 4,200 m (13,800 ft). It is located in the Cochabamba Department, Arani Province, Vacas Municipality. It lies southwest of Qucha Quchayuq Urqu.
