= Betty Veizaga =

Bolivian folk music musician

Natividad Betty Veizaga Siles (Vacas, Cochabamba, 1957) is a Bolivian folk music musician.

She can play the charango and the ronroco and sings mainly in Quechua.

She started in Vacas local radio station and she is a member of Grupo Pukaj Wayra with her siblings, and duets Takiytinku with her husband Rufo Zurita, and Quilla Zurita with her daughter.

== Discography ==
=== Betty Veizaga in Grupo Pukaj Wayra ===
- Ama Sua, Ama Qhella, Ama Llulla, Lyrichord disc – United States, 1981.
- A Mi Tierra, Origo 1004 – (Europe), 1984
- Vi bygger en skola, 1987.
- Vaqueñita, Lauro – Bolivia, 1993.
- Tinkuy, Lauro – Bolivia, 1994
- Así es mi tierra, Lauro – Bolivia, 1997; Sol de los Andes – Ecuador, 1998.
- Con sentimiento a mi tierra, Lauro – Bolivia, 1999.
- Canta conmigo ..., Lauro – Bolivia, 2000.
- El valluno cholero, Bolivia.

=== Betty – Quilla and Grupo Pukaj Wayra ===
- Nuestra ilusión, Lauro – Bolivia, 2003.
- A mi Bolivia, Bolivia, 2009.

=== Betty – Quilla ===
- Con lo mejor y algo más, Bolivia.

=== Takiytinku (Rufo Zurita – Betty Veizaga) ===
- Un encuentro de canto tradicional, Bolivia.
- El valluno cholero, Bolivia.
- Lo Nuevo, lo Mejor de Pukay Wayra, Bolivia.
- Soledad, Bolivia, 2010.

=== Betty Veizaga and Rolando Quinteros ===
- Carnavaleando con..., Bolivia.
