= Tiraque =

- Location in Bolivia
- Coordinates: 17°25′36″S 65°43′22″W
- Country: Bolivia
- Department: Cochabamba Department
- Province: Tiraque Province
- Municipality: Tiraque Municipality
- Canton: Tiraque Canton
- Elevation: 10,810 ft (3,295 m)

Population (2001)
  - Total: 1,906
- Time zone: UTC-4 (BOT)

Tiraque is a location in the Cochabamba Department, Bolivia, and capital of the Tiraque Province. At the time of census 2001 it had a population of 1,906.

== Climate ==
Climate data for Tiraque, elevation 3,304 m (10,840 ft)
Month	Jan	Feb	Mar	Apr	May	Jun	Jul	Aug	Sep	Oct	Nov	Dec	Year
Mean daily maximum °C (°F)	19.3 (66.7)	19.1 (66.4)	19.7 (67.5)	20.2 (68.4)	20.1 (68.2)	19.1 (66.4)	18.9 (66.0)	19.2 (66.6)	19.6 (67.3)	20.8 (69.4)	20.8 (69.4)	20.0 (68.0)	19.7 (67.5)
Daily mean °C (°F)	13.1 (55.6)	12.9 (55.2)	13.0 (55.4)	12.7 (54.9)	11.7 (53.1)	10.5 (50.9)	10.2 (50.4)	11.0 (51.8)	12.0 (53.6)	13.2 (55.8)	13.6 (56.5)	13.4 (56.1)	12.3 (54.1)
Mean daily minimum °C (°F)	7.0 (44.6)	6.7 (44.1)	6.2 (43.2)	5.2 (41.4)	3.3 (37.9)	2.0 (35.6)	1.5 (34.7)	2.8 (37.0)	4.4 (39.9)	5.7 (42.3)	6.5 (43.7)	6.9 (44.4)	4.9 (40.7)
Average precipitation mm (inches)	120.2 (4.73)	98.3 (3.87)	77.2 (3.04)	19.3 (0.76)	5.7 (0.22)	4.0 (0.16)	4.3 (0.17)	7.5 (0.30)	12.0 (0.47)	23.6 (0.93)	46.5 (1.83)	94.2 (3.71)	512.8 (20.19)
Average precipitation days	13.9	12.4	10.3	3.3	0.9	0.7	0.6	1.6	2.2	3.7	6.4	10.7	66.7
Source: Servicio Nacional de Meteorología e Hidrología de Bolivia
