= Vacas, Cochabamba =

Vacas Wak'as
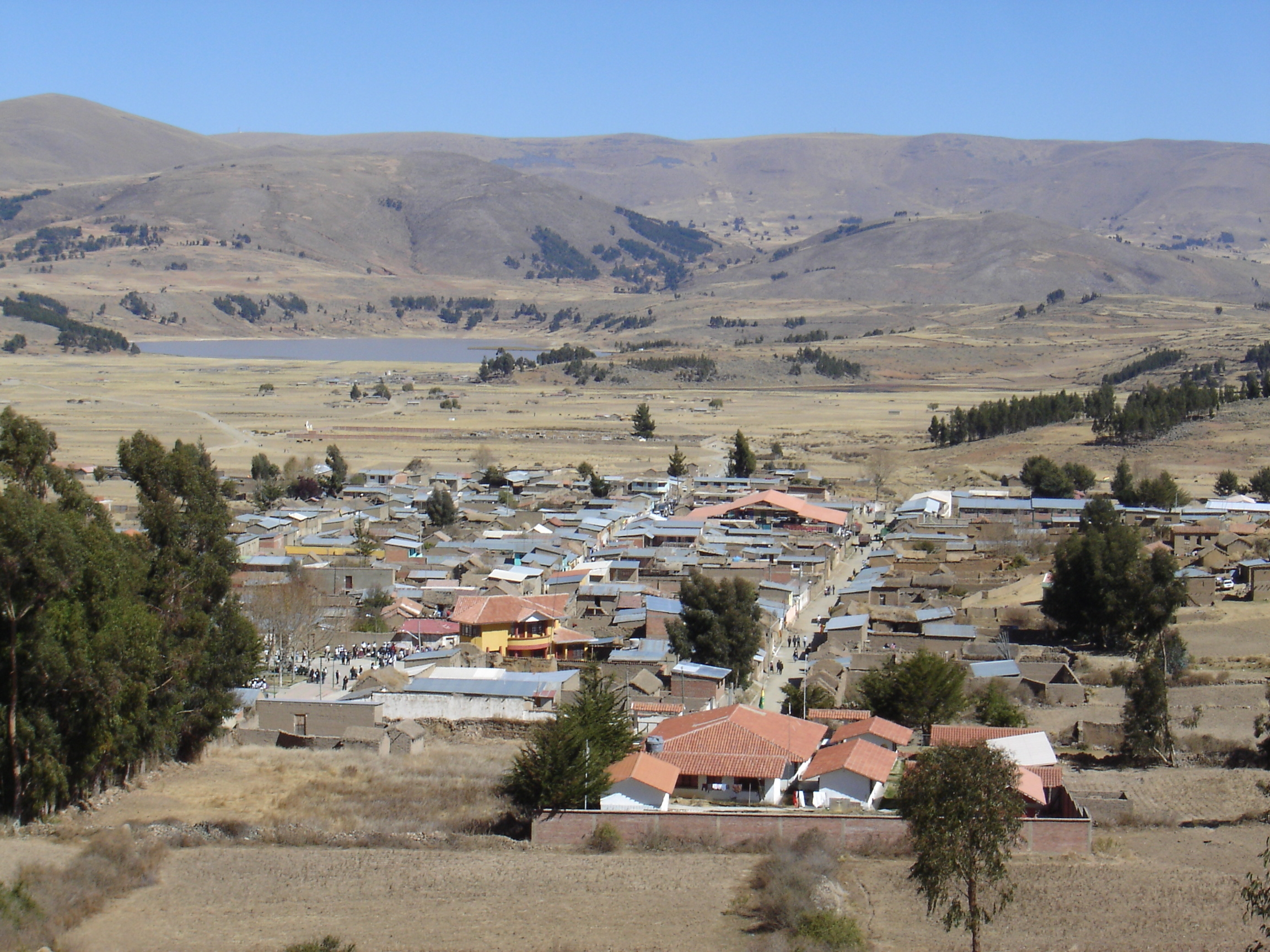
- Panoramic view of Vacas as seen from Calvario de la Virgen Santa Bárbara

- Location within Bolivia
- Coordinates: 17°34′26″S 65°34′46″W
- Country: Bolivia
- Department: Cochabamba Department
- Province: Arani Province
- Municipality: Vacas Municipality
- Established: 1986

Government
  - Mayor: Teófilo Vásquez Santos
- Elevation: 3,475 m (11,401 ft)

Population (2001)
  - Total: 650
- Time zone: UTC-4 (BOT)
- Area code: 00 591 4

Vacas (Quechua name: Wak'as, deriving from Wak'a) is a Bolivian village in the southeast of the Cochabamba Department. It is the capital of the Vacas Municipality, the second municipal section of the Arani Province. Vacas is located about 85 km far from Cochabamba and about 30 km far from Arani.

The people living in Vacas and surrounding areas are predominantly indigenous citizens of Quechuan descent. During the Inca period Vacas served as a tampu along the Inca road system that led to Inkallaqta and Pocona. Later on, during the colonial period, it was founded under the name of "Santa Bárbara de Bacas".

Vacas is situated in a rural environment in the altitudes of the Cono Sur (Southern Cone) of Cochabamba. The climate is suitable for the cultivation of potatoes, wheat, barley, broad bean and oat. Vacas is known as the "Land of the potato" (Quechua: Papaq llaqtan, Spanish: La patria de la papa). The fields are prepared with the help of yokes of oxen. The cultivation of the soil is supplemented by animal husbandry of cows, sheep, pigs and hens.

== Education ==
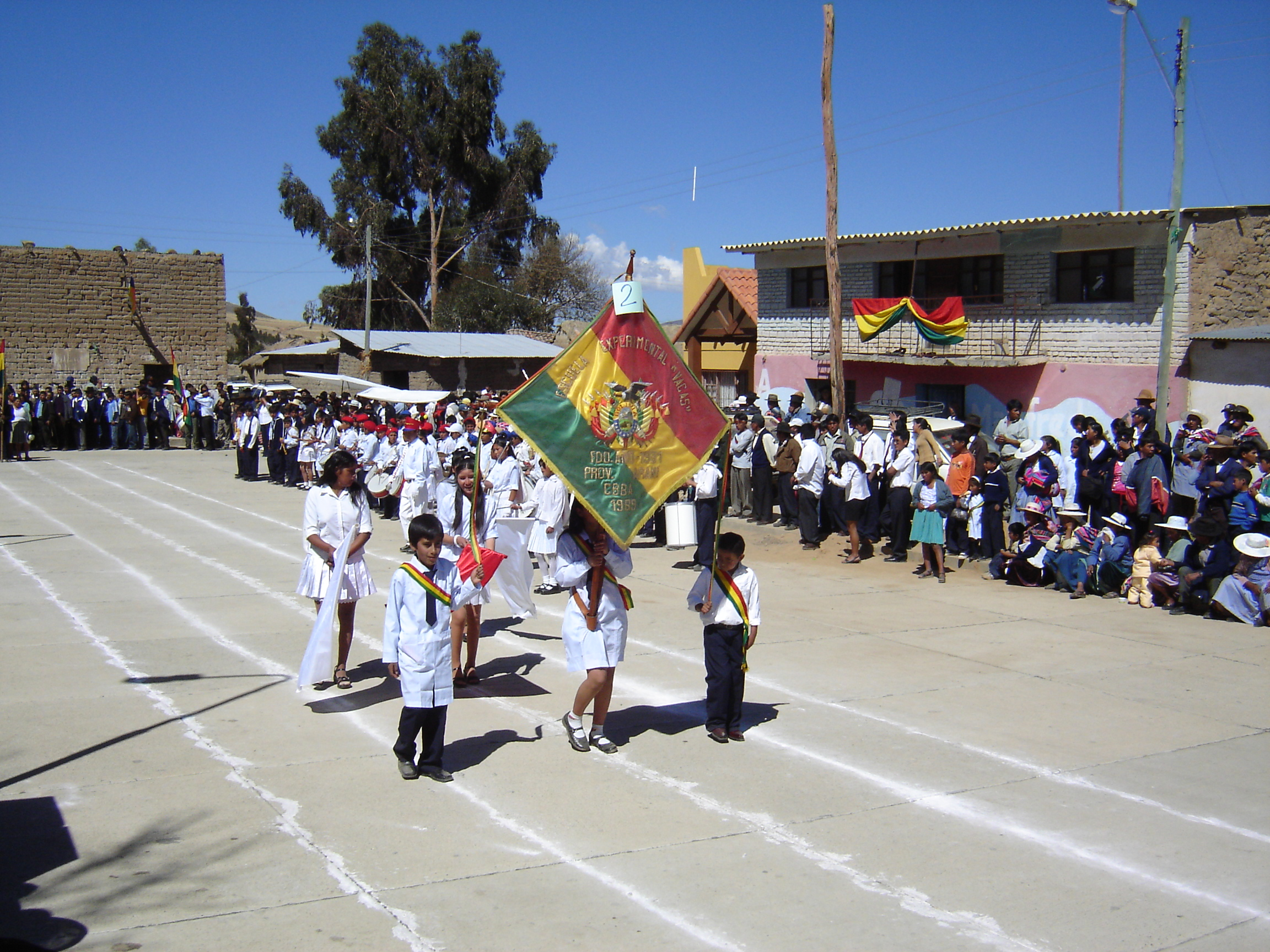
Pupils of the Escuela Unidad Experimental in Vacas during the parade of August 6

As to education all types of schools are available in or next to Vacas.

- Preschool education: Guardería Sagrado Corazón de Jesús.
- Primary school: Escuela Unidad Experimental, founded in 1862
- Secondary school: Colegio Profesor Toribio Claure
- Higher education: Ismael Montes Teacher Training College (Escuela Superior de Formación de Maestros "Ismael Montes" or ESFM "Ismael Montes") (in Challwa Mayu)

== Festivities ==
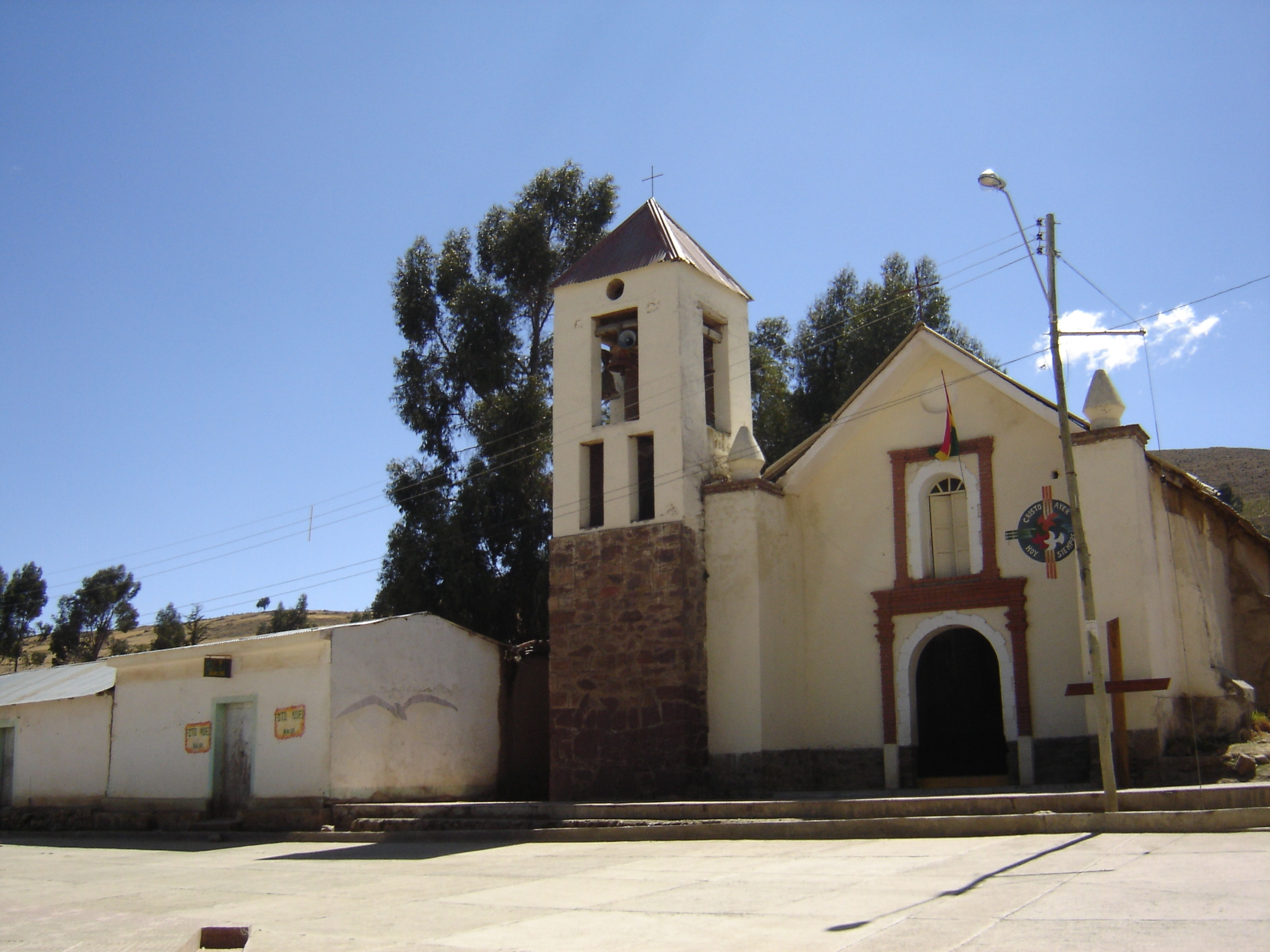
Saint Barbara church

- May 4: Santa Vera Cruz Tatala
- May or June: Corpus Christi
- June 29: Saint Peter
- July 16: Our Lady of Mount Carmel, patron saint of Bolivia
- October 15: Anniversary of Vacas Municipality
- December 4: Saint Barbara, Anniversary of Vacas

== Fairs ==
- April: Fish, potato and crafts fair

== See also ==
- Asiru Qucha
- Parqu Qucha
- Qullpa Qucha
