= Qullpa Qucha =

Salt lake in Bolivia

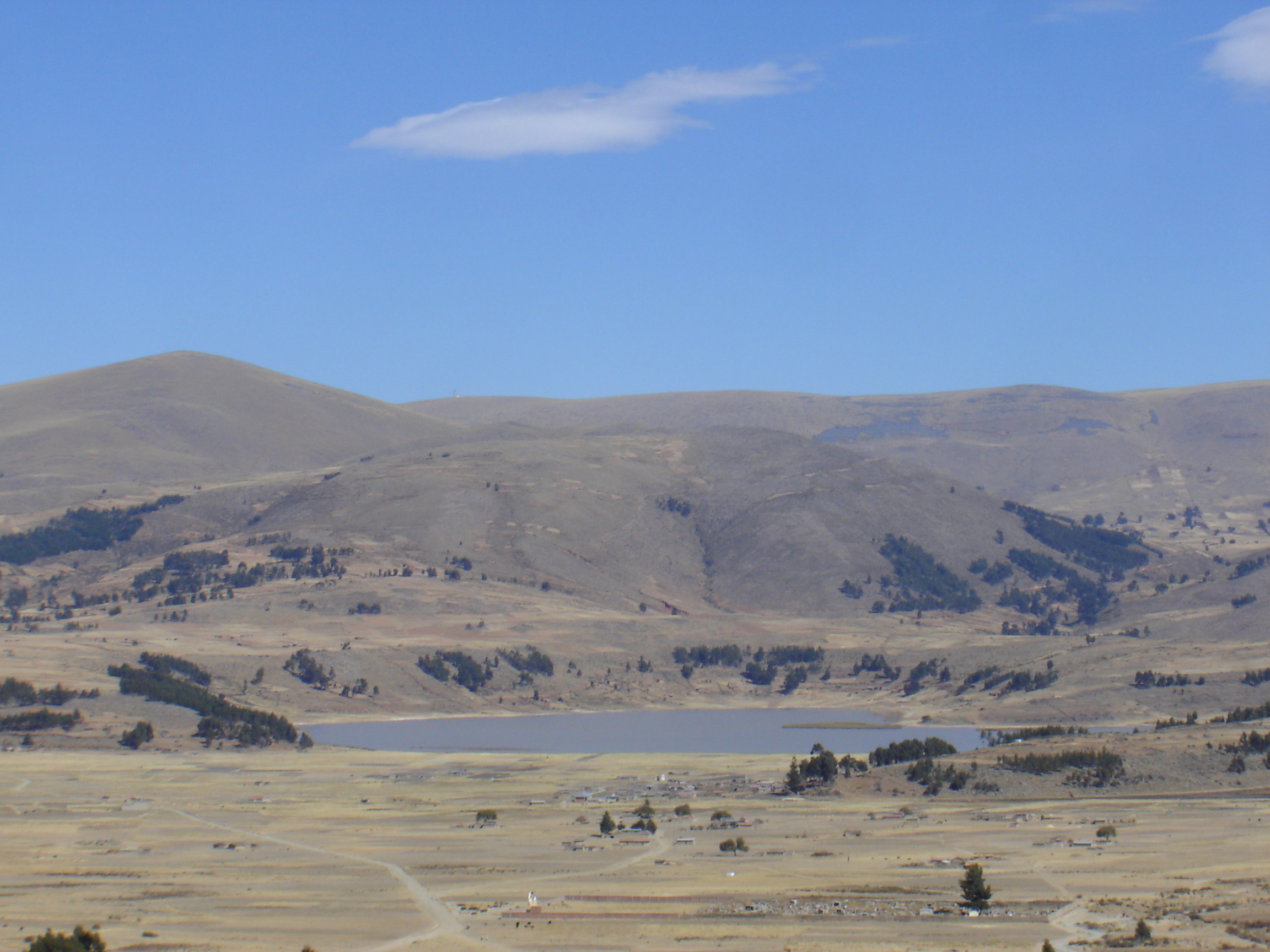

- Location within Cochabamba Location within Bolivia Location within South America
- Interactive map of Qullpa Qucha
- Location: Cono Sur, Vacas Municipality, Cochabamba Department, Arani Province
- Coordinates: 17°36′30″S 65°35′00″W
- Basin countries: Bolivia
- Surface area: 2.3 km^{2} (0.89 sq mi)
- Surface elevation: 3,404 m (11,168 ft)
- Settlements: Vacas, Qullpaqucha

Qullpa Qucha (Quechua qullpa salty, saltpeter, qucha lake, hispanicized spellings Collpa Cocha, Collpacocha, Khollpa Khocha, Kollpa Q'ocha) is a Bolivian lake located in Vacas Municipality, Arani Province, Cochabamba Department.

Its surface area is 2.3 km^{2} (0.89 sq mi).

== See also ==
- Phaqcha Mayu
- Parqu Qucha
- Asiru Qucha
- Pilawit'u
