= Arani Province =

Arani
- Province
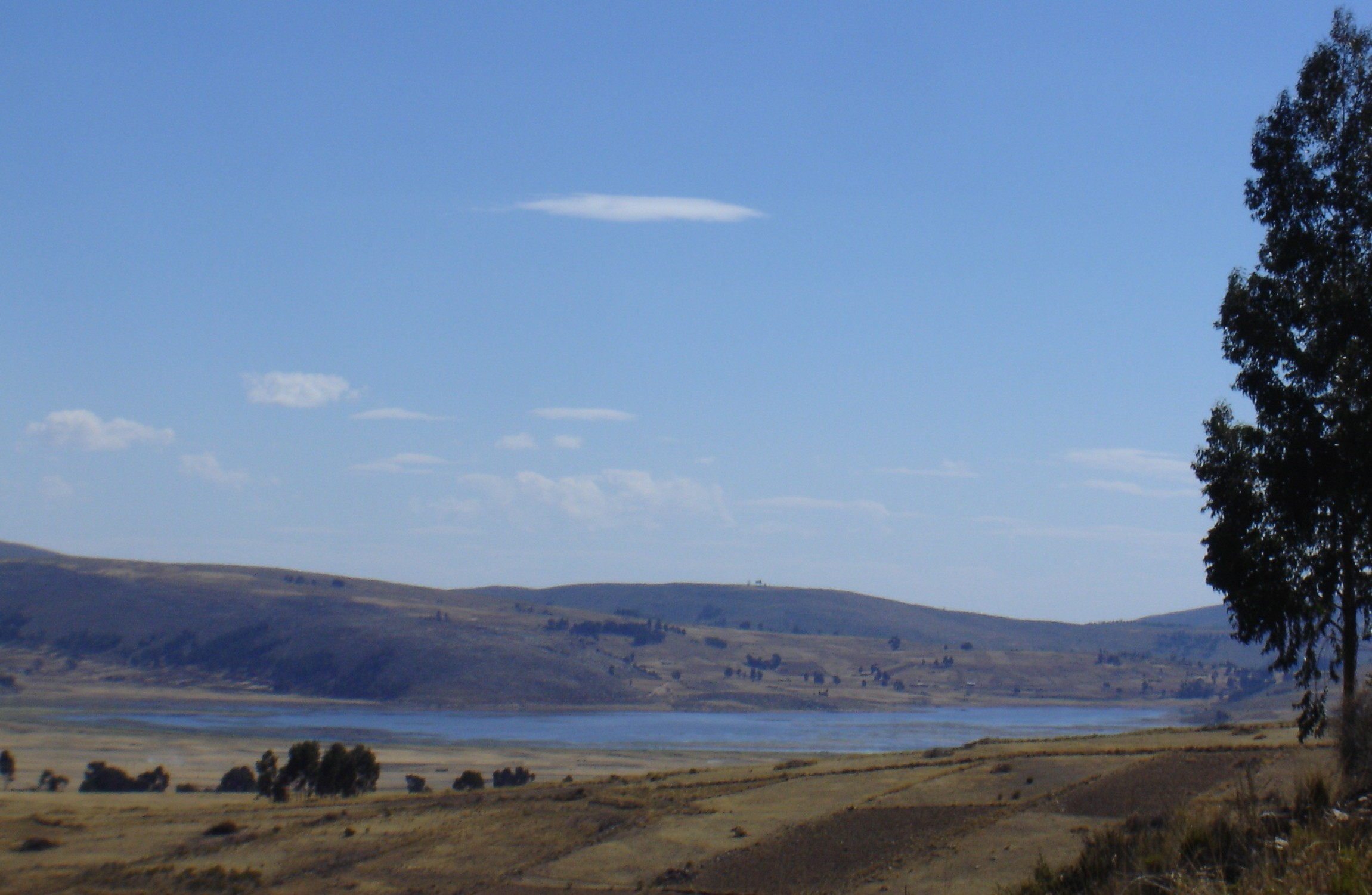
- Parqu Qucha, one of the lakes of the Vacas Municipality

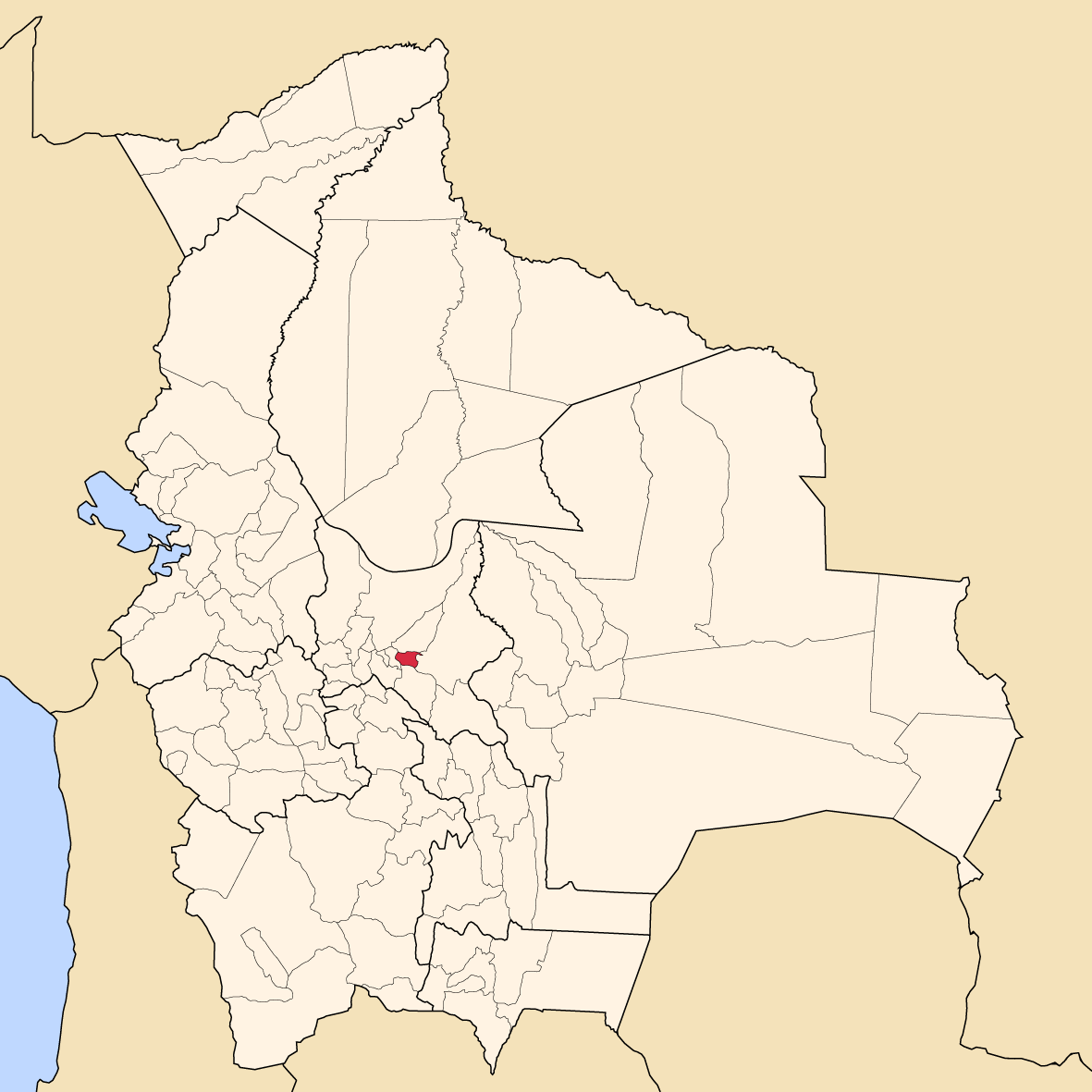
- Location of the Arani Province within Bolivia

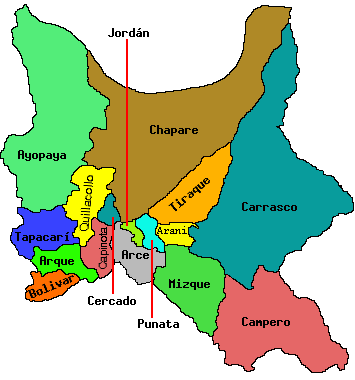
- Provinces of the Cochabamba Department
- Coordinates: 17°37′S 66°05′W
- Country: Bolivia
- Department: Cochabamba Department
- Municipalities: 2
- Cantons: 4
- Foundation: November 24, 1914
- Capital: Arani

Area
  - Total: 867 sq mi (2,245 km^{2})

Population (2024 census)
  - Total: 19,836
  - Density: 22.88/sq mi (8.836/km^{2})
  - Ethnicities: Quechua
- Time zone: UTC-4 (BOT)
- Area code: BO.CB.AR

Arani is a province in Cochabamba Department, Bolivia. Its capital is Arani, situated about 53 km from Cochabamba. Arani is known for its bread and its artisan wickerwork.

== Geography ==
Some of the highest mountains of the province are listed below:

- Chawpi Urqu
- Chullpa Ch'utu
- Ikma Mayu
- Inka P'iqi
- Iskay Wasi
- Jatun Llallawa
- Jatun Punta Mayuq
- Jatun Salla
- Juch'uy Llallawa
- Kuntur
- K'illi K'illi
- Llusk'a Llusk'a
- Mayu Urqu
- Murun Pampa
- Ñuñu Urqu
- Puka Chanka
- Pukara
- Phaqcha Urqu
- Qucha Quchayuq Urqu
- Qullpa Qucha Urqu
- Qullu Mayu
- Qutu Rumi
- Q'illu Q'asa
- Salla Punta
- Salla Q'asa
- Siqina Urqu
- T'utura Pampa
- Urqu Punta
- Wanu Wanu
- Waylla Qucha
- Yana Qucha

== Subdivision ==
The province is divided into two municipalities which are further subdivided into four cantons.

Section	Municipality	Inhabitants	Seat	Inhabitants
1st	Arani	11,542	Arani	3,512
2nd	Vacas	12,511	Vacas	650

Arani Municipality consists of three cantons, Arani, Pocoata and Collpaciaco. Vacas Municipality is not further subdivided, so Vacas Canton and Vacas Municipality are identical.

== Population ==
The people in the Arani Province are mainly indigenous citizens of Quechua descent.

Ethnic group	Arani Municipality	Vacas Municipality
Quechua	87.2	94.4
Aymara	0.4	0.2
Guarani, Chiquitos, Moxos	0.2	0.0
Not indigenous	12.1	5.4
Other indigenous groups	0.1	0.1

== Languages ==
The languages spoken in the Arani Province are mainly Quechua and Spanish. The following table shows the number of those belonging to the recognized group of speakers.

Language	Arani Municipality	Vacas Municipality
Quechua	10,347	11,662
Aymara	76	39
Guarani	5	2
Another native	5	2
Spanish	7,082	4,236
Foreign	49	11
Only native	3,902	7,540
Native and Spanish	6,467	4,131
Only Spanish	615	106

== Tourism ==
Festivals and Fairs:

- August 14–15: Saint Isidore the Laborer in Qullpayaku, 2 days
- August 24–25: Virgen la Bella in Arani, 2 days
- September 20: Farmers' fair in Tacopaya, 1 day
- 3rd week in November: Bread fair in Arani, 1 day
- December 4: Saint Barbara in Vacas

Other tourist attractions include the church of Saint Bartholomew (San Bartolomé) in Arani, built in 1610, which is dedicated to the Virgen la Bella, and the lakes in Vacas Municipality: Parqu Qucha, Asiru Qucha, Junt'utuyu, Pilawit'u, Qullpa Qucha and Yanatama.

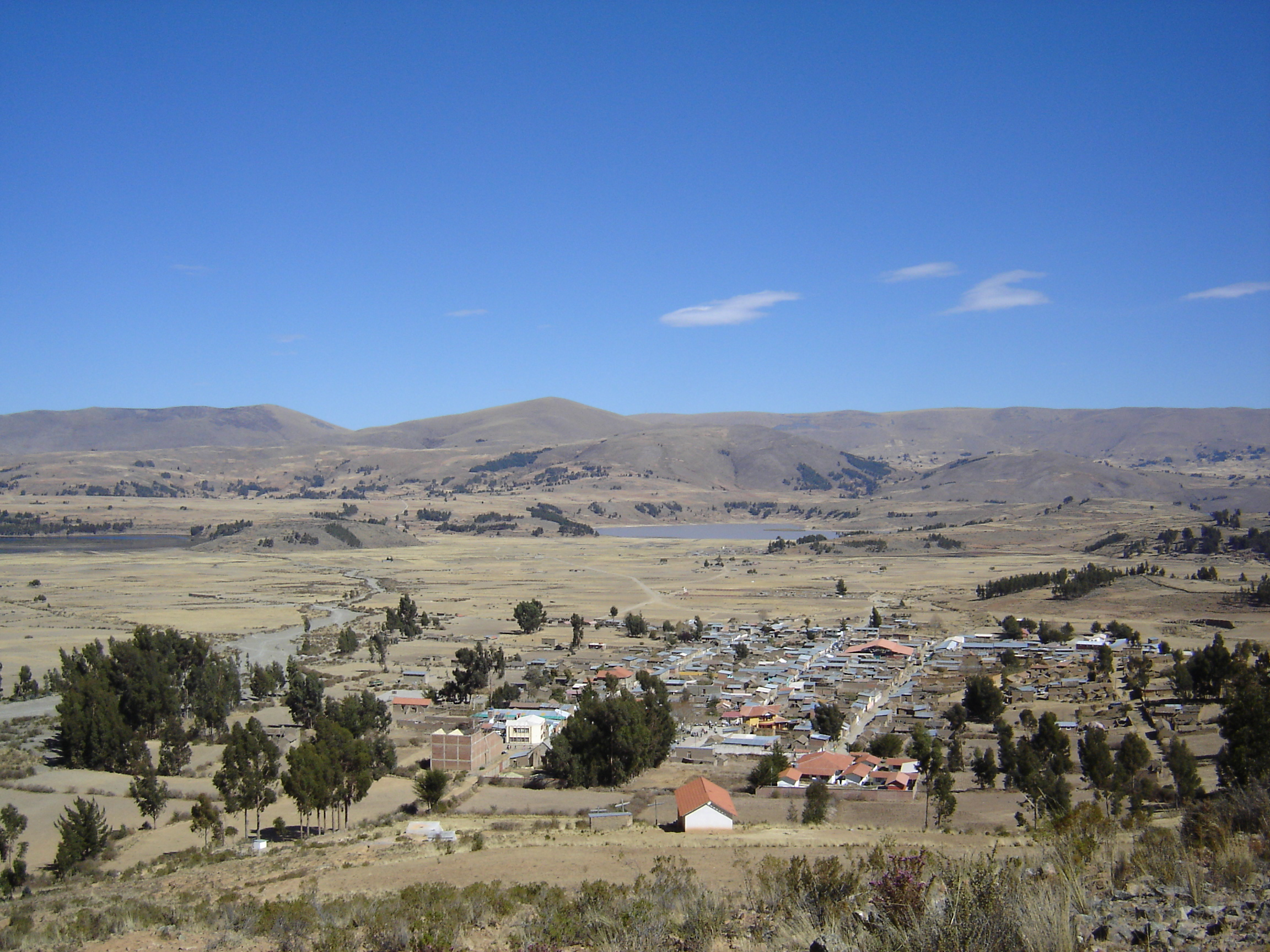
Vacas with two of its lakes: Pilawit'u on the left and Qullpa Qucha in the center

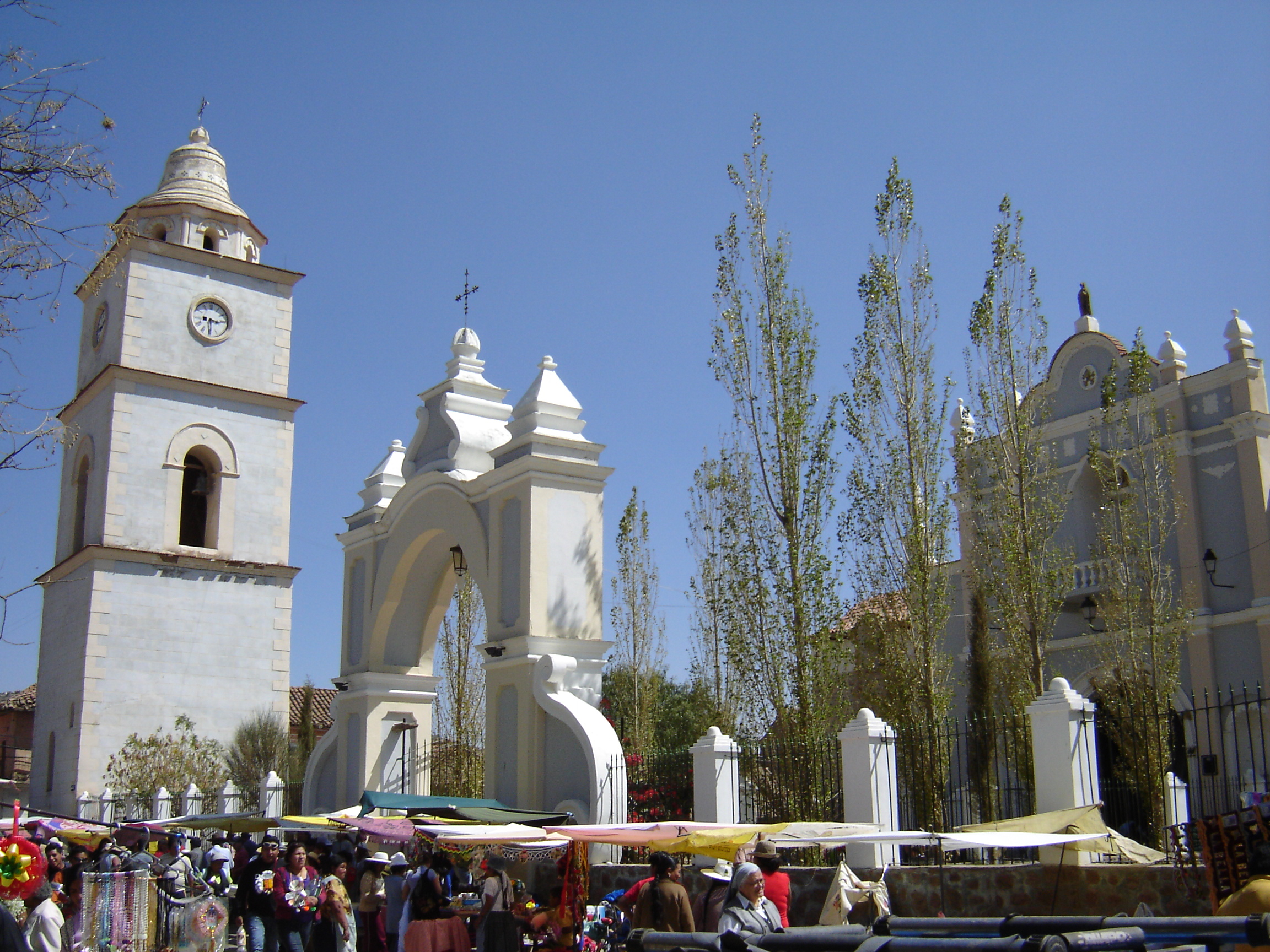
San Bartolomé church in Arani which keeps the shrine of the Virgen La Bella

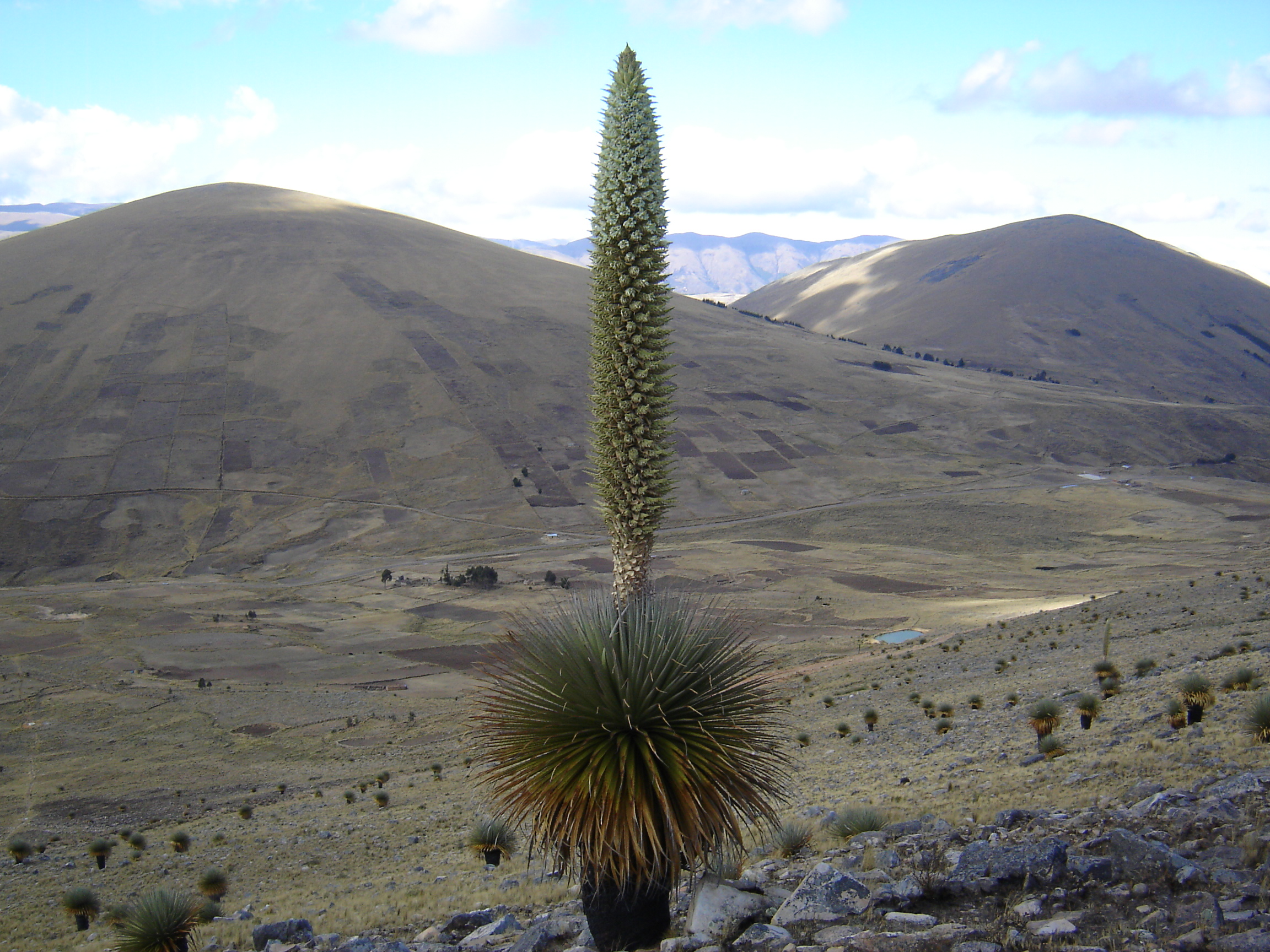
The giant Puya raimondi plants grow on Khurupampa mountain in the Vacas Municipality.

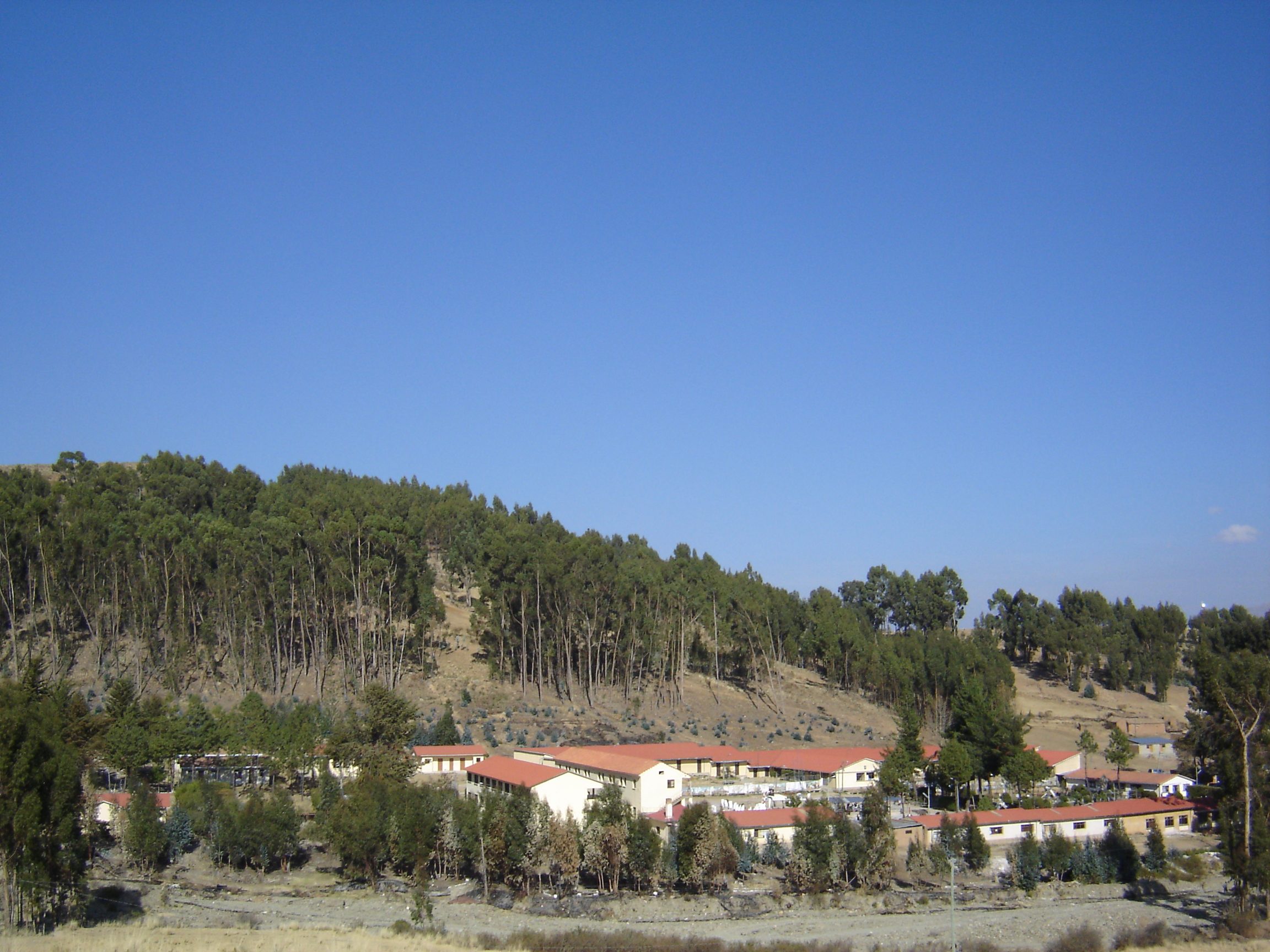
Ismael Montes Teacher Training College in Challwa Mayu

== See also ==
- Ismael Montes Teacher Training College
