= Tiraque Province =

- Province
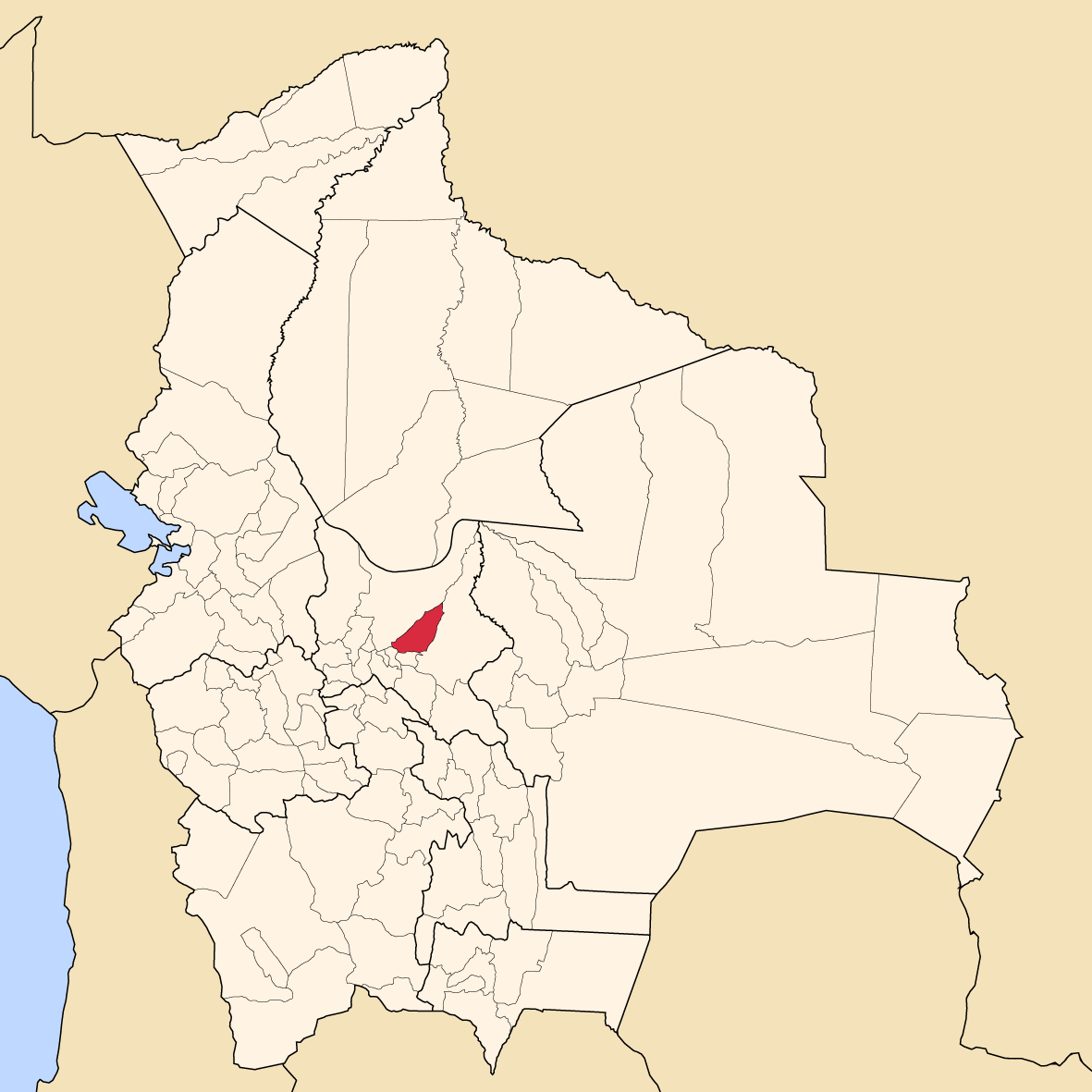
- Location of the Tiraque Province within Bolivia

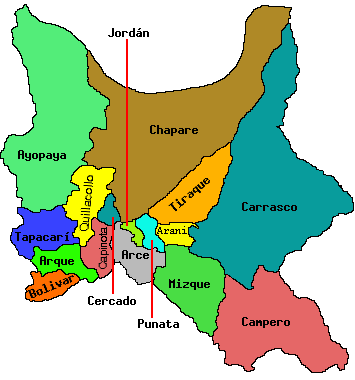
- Location of the Tiraque Province within the Cochabamba Department
- Coordinates: 17°20′0″S 65°55′0″W
- Country: Bolivia
- Department: Cochabamba Department
- Capital: Tiraque

Government
  - Mayor: Fidel Felix Salazar Bustamante (2008)
  - Council President: Gabriel Inturias Rios

Area
  - Total: 1,060 sq mi (2,740 km^{2})
- Elevation: 10,500 ft (3,200 m)

Population (2024 census)
  - Total: 45,257
  - Density: 42.8/sq mi (16.5/km^{2})
- Time zone: UTC-4 (BOT)

Tiraque is a province in the Cochabamba Department in central Bolivia. Its capital is Tiraque.

== Subdivision ==
The province is divided into two municipalities which are further subdivided into cantons.

Section	Municipality	Seat
1st	Tiraque Municipality	Tiraque
2nd	Shinahota Municipality	Shinahota

Shinahota Municipality (formerly Shinahota Canton or Central Busch Canton being a part of Tiraque Province) was created on July 4, 2009.

== Languages ==
The languages spoken in the Tiraque Province are mainly Quechua and Spanish.

Language	Inhabitants
Quechua	29,569
Aymara	757
Guaraní	30
Another native	39
Spanish	19,789
Foreign	101
Only native	12,739
Native and Spanish	17,025
Only Spanish	2,765

== Places of interest ==
- Carrasco National Park

== See also ==
- Jatun Mayu
- Pila Qucha
- Sayt'u Qucha
- T'utura Qucha
