= Asiru Qucha =

Lake in Bolivia

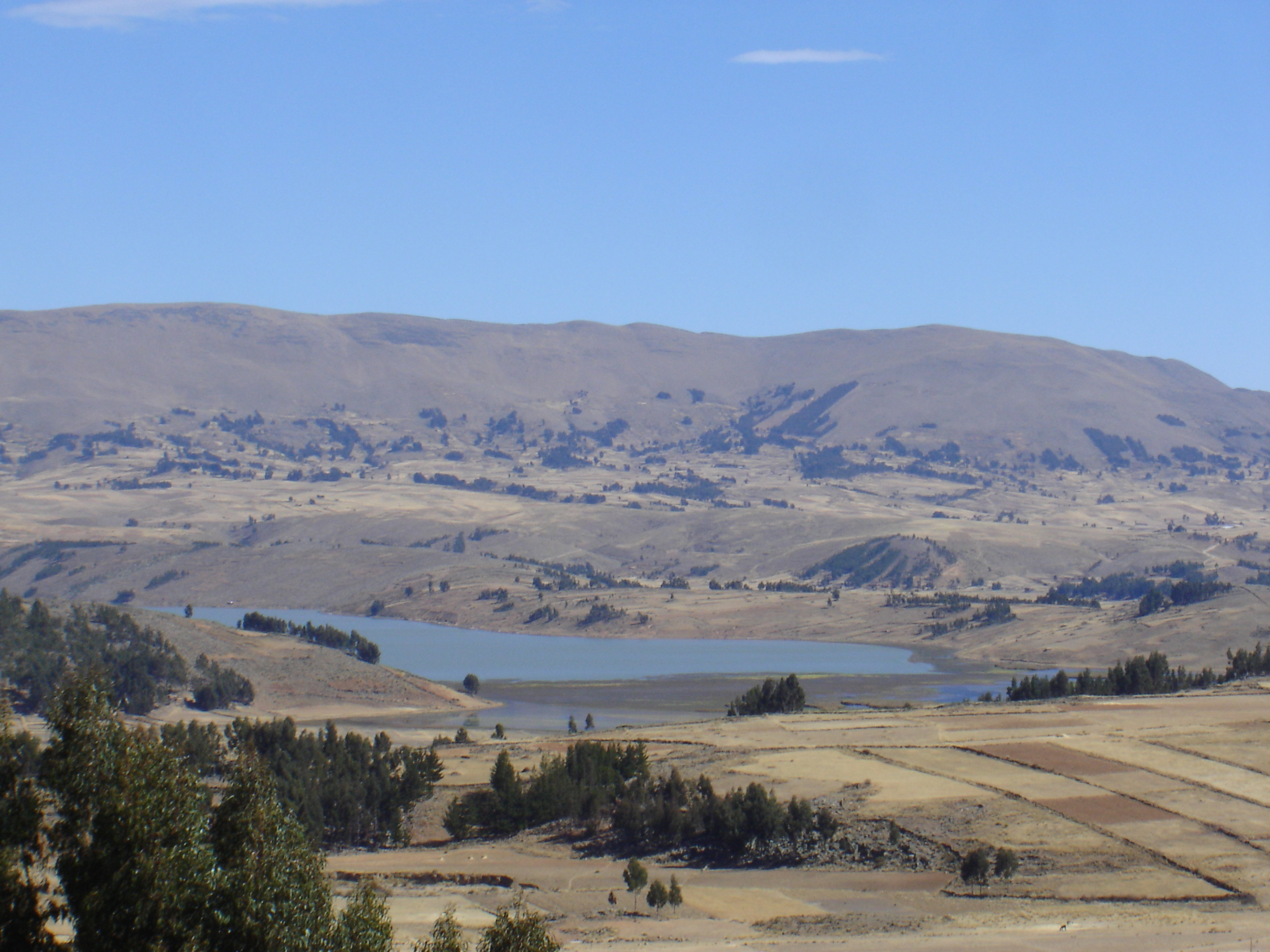
- partial view

- Location within Cochabamba Location within Bolivia Location within South America
- Interactive map of Asiru Qucha
- Location: Cono Sur, Vacas Municipality, Arani Province, Cochabamba Department
- Coordinates: 17°36′15″S 65°36′5″W
- Primary inflows: Asiru Qucha River, Chillawi P'ujru, Inka Mayu with Q'asa Mayu, Uqullu Mayu, Pisqu Mayu
- Basin countries: Bolivia
- Surface area: 5.9 km^{2} (2.3 sq mi)
- Surface elevation: 3,420 m (11,220 ft)
- Settlements: Vacas

Asiru Qucha (Aymara asiru snake, Quechua qucha lake, Hispanicized spellings Acero Cocha, Acero Khocha, Acero Q'ocha) is a Bolivian lake located in the Vacas Municipality, Arani Province, Cochabamba Department.

The main tributaries of Asiru Qucha are Asiru Qucha River, Chillawi P'ujru, Inka Mayu with Q'asa Mayu, Juq'ullu Mayu, and Pisqu Mayu. Its surface area is 5.9 km^{2} (2.3 sq mi).

== See also ==
- Phaqcha Mayu
- Parqu Qucha
- Qullpa Qucha
- Pilawit'u
