= Parqu Qucha (Bolivia) =

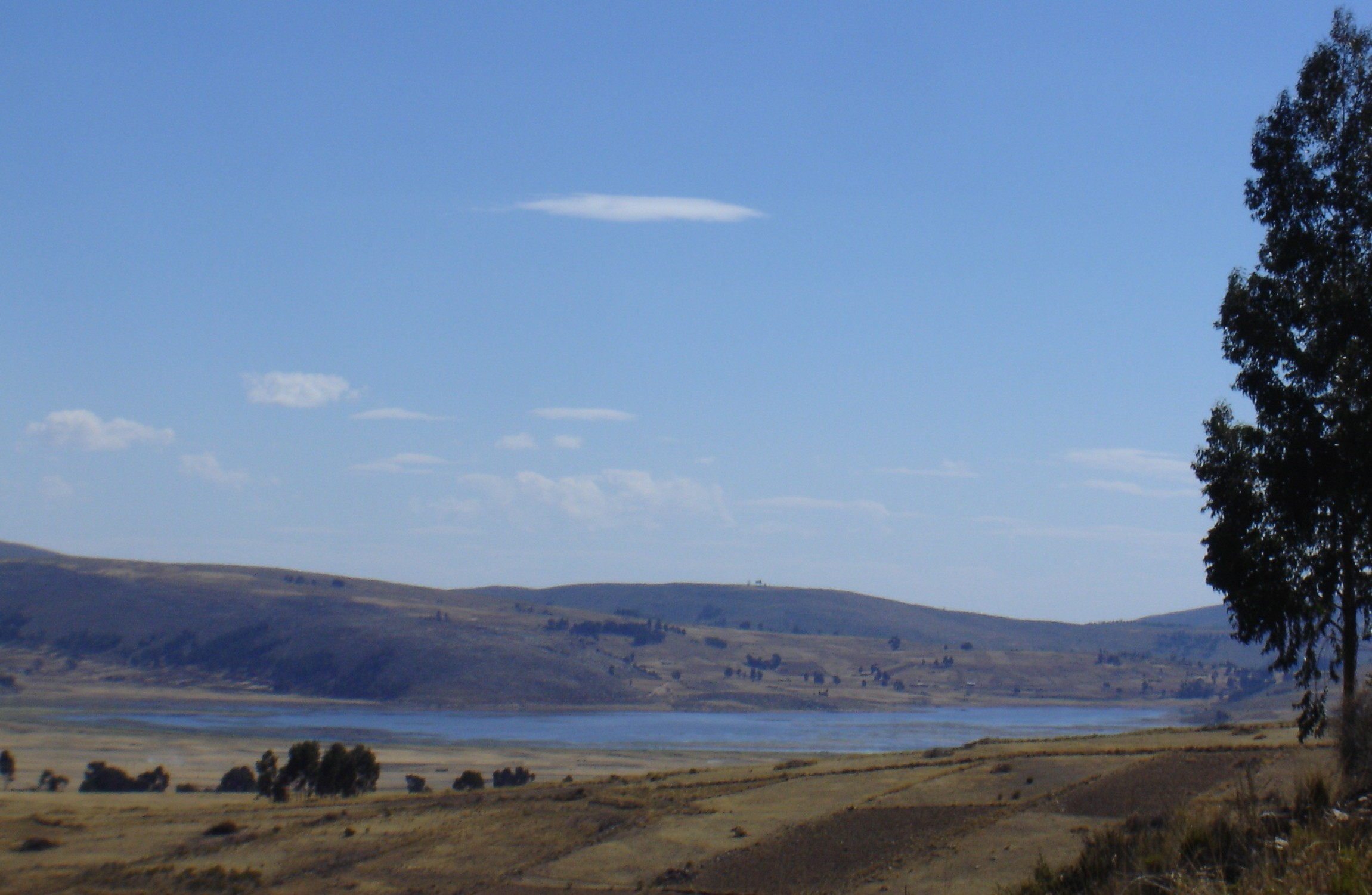
- Partial view of the lake

- Location within Cochabamba Location within Bolivia Location within South America
- Interactive map of Parqu Qucha
- Location: Cono Sur, Vacas Municipality, Arani Province, Cochabamba Department
- Coordinates: 17°33′20″S 65°37′30″W
- Primary inflows: Challwa Mayu, Jatun Calada, Jatun Mayu, Kañara, Parqu Qucha, Pedregal River, Wasa K'uchu
- Basin countries: Bolivia
- Surface area: 10.7 km^{2} (4.1 sq mi)
- Surface elevation: 3,414 m (11,201 ft)
- Settlements: Vacas, Parqu Qucha

Parqu Qucha (Quechua parquy irrigation, qucha lake, "irrigation lake", hispanicized spellings Parco Cocha, Parco Khocha, Parcococha, Parkho Khocha, Parko Q'ocha) is a Bolivian lake located in Vacas Municipality, Arani Province, Cochabamba Department.

The most important rivers which flow into Parqu Qucha are Challwa Mayu, Jatun Calada, Jatun Mayu, Kañara, Parqu Qucha, Pedregal River, Wasa K'uchu. Its surface area is 10.7 km^{2} (4.1 sq mi).

== See also ==
- Asiru Qucha
- Qullpa Qucha
- Pilawit'u
