= List of senators of Cochabamba =

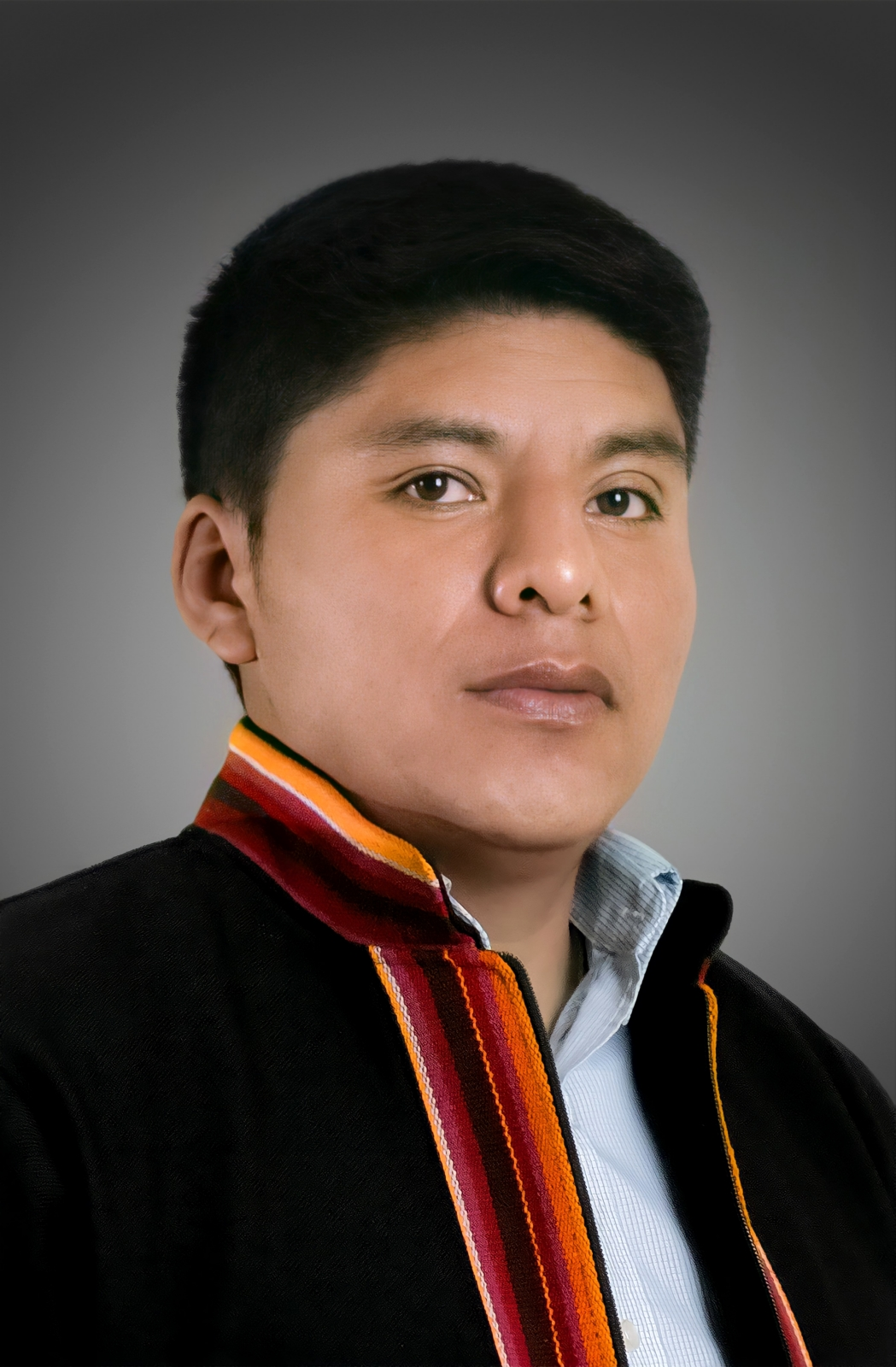
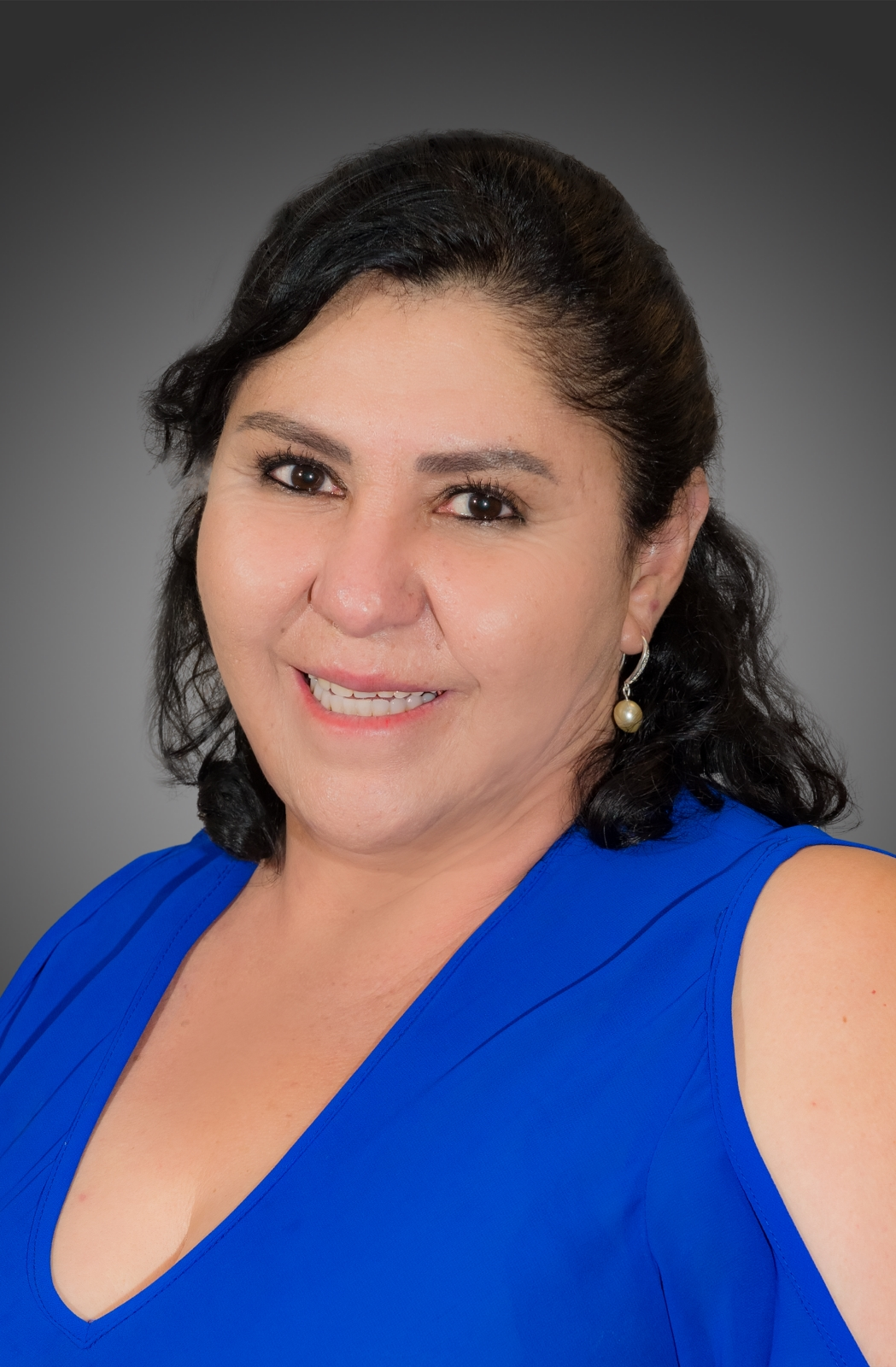
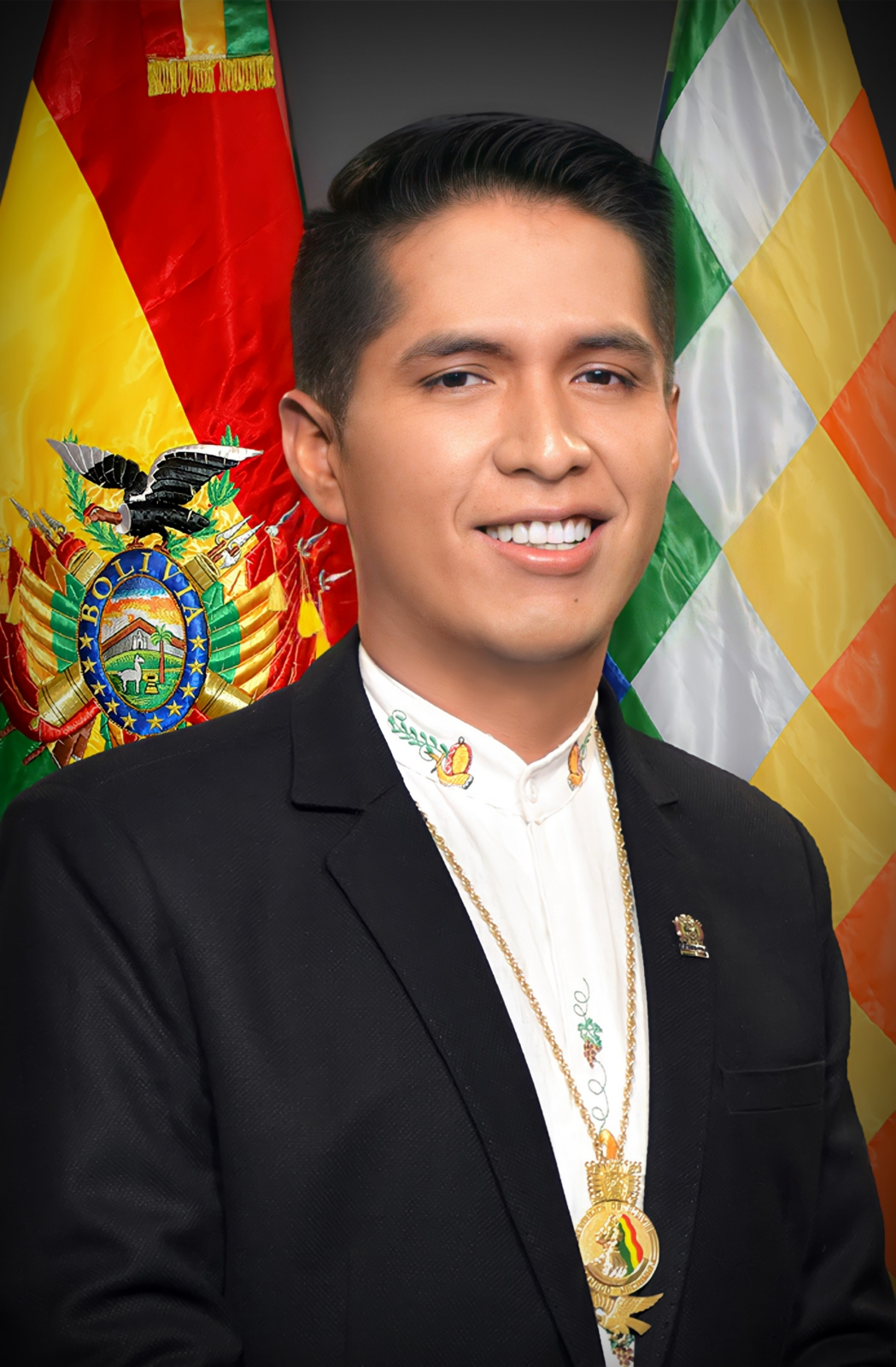
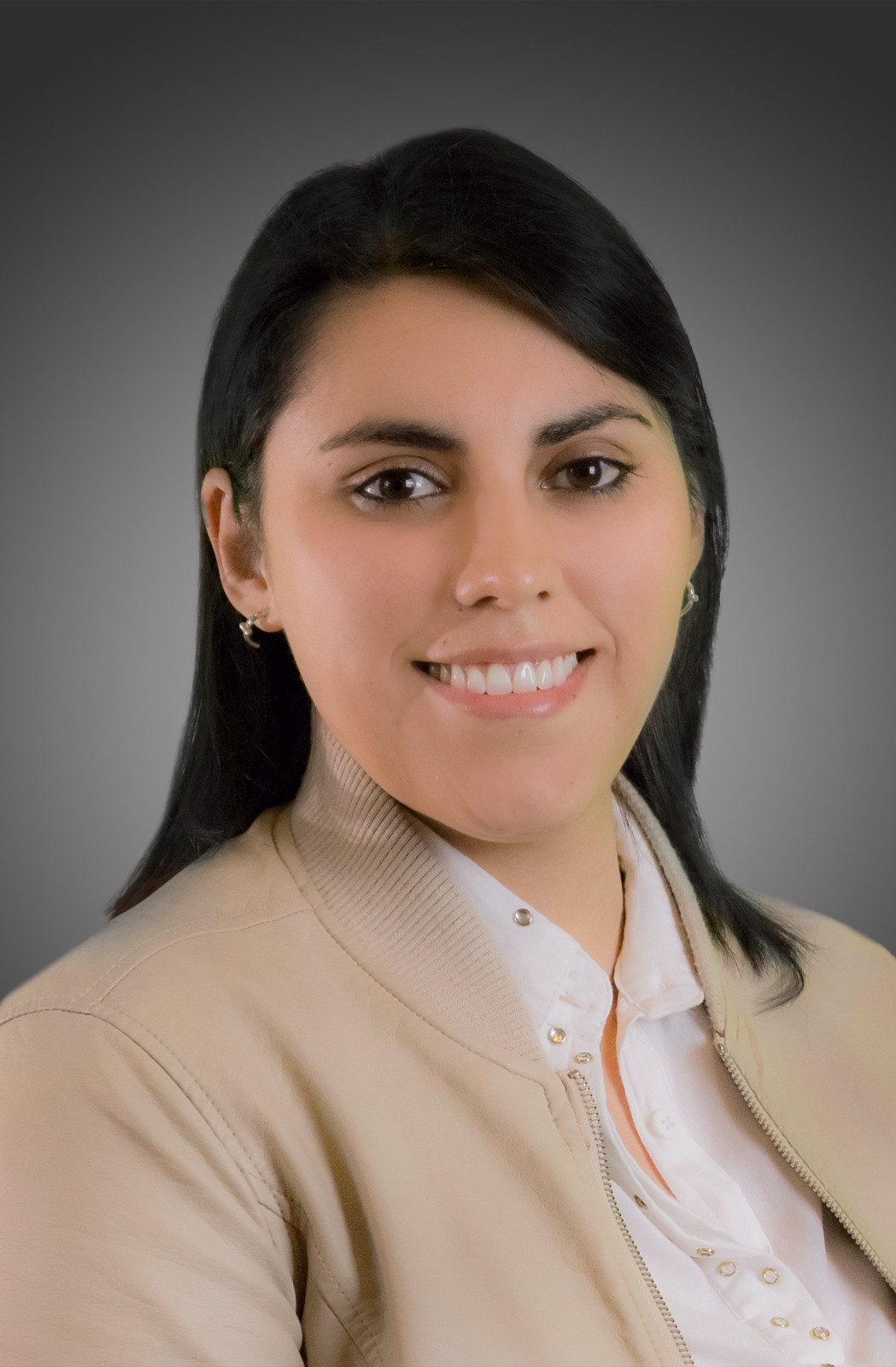
From left to right, top to bottom: Leonardo Loza (MAS), Patricia Arce (MAS), Andrónico Rodríguez (MAS), and Andrea Barrientos (MAS).

Cochabamba is represented in the Plurinational Legislative Assembly of Bolivia by four senators and their alternates elected through proportional representation. They serve five-year terms and qualify for reelection indefinitely. The current delegation comprises three senators from the Movement for Socialism (MAS-IPSP) and one from Civic Community (CC): Leonardo Loza, Patricia Arce, Andrónico Rodríguez, and Andrea Barrientos. Their respective alternates are: Lucy Escobar, Hermo Pérez, Dilma Cabrera, and Guillermo Seoane. Although the bicameral system was adopted in the 1831 Constitution and was maintained in subsequently promulgated constitutions, it can be affirmed that with the exception of very small intervals, the Senate did not, in fact, exercise its functions until the convocation of the 1882 legislature. Furthermore, due to heavy political instability and frequent military interventions since 1882, Bolivia did not experience a continuous, uninterrupted legislative session until 1982.

== List of senators ==
Legislature	L.	Senator	Party	Term of office		Alternate	Party	Term of office		E.	Caucus	Ref.	
Legislature	L.	Senator	Party	Took office	Left office	Alternate	Party	Took office	Left office	E.	Caucus	Sen.	Alt.
2010–2015	1°	Adolfo Mendoza	MAS	19 January 2010	18 January 2015	Carmen Peredo	MAS	19 January 2010	18 January 2015	2009	MAS		
2010–2015	2°	Marcelina Chávez	MAS	19 January 2010	16 April 2014	Julio César Torrico	MAS	19 January 2010	8 May 2014	2009	MAS	(Note: Died in office.)	
2010–2015	2°	Julio César Torrico	MAS	8 May 2014	18 January 2015	Nora Martínez	MAS	8 May 2014	18 January 2015	2009	MAS		
2010–2015	3°	Julio Salazar	MAS	19 January 2010	18 January 2015	Nelly Fernández	MAS	19 January 2010	18 January 2015	2009	MAS		
2010–2015	1°	Bernard Gutiérrez	IND	19 January 2010	10 July 2014	Lenny Zaconeta	IND	19 January 2010	25 July 2014	2009	CN	(Note: Resigned to run for office.)	
2010–2015	1°	Lenny Zaconeta	IND	25 July 2014	18 January 2015	Vacant		25 July 2014	18 January 2015	2009	CN		
2015–2020	1°	Ciro Zabala	MAS	18 January 2015	3 November 2020	Carola Arraya	MAS	23 January 2015	3 November 2020	2014	MAS		
2015–2020	2°	Ester Torrico	MAS	18 January 2015	2 May 2018	Cupertino Mamani	MAS	23 January 2015	2 May 2018	2014	MAS	(Note: Resigned to become counselor in Argentina.)	
2015–2020	2°	Cupertino Mamani	MAS	2 May 2018	3 November 2020	Praxides Castellón	MAS	5 September 2018	3 November 2020	2014	MAS		
2015–2020	3°	Efraín Chambi	MAS	18 January 2015	3 November 2020	Cándida Aguilar	MAS	23 January 2015	3 November 2020	2014	MAS		
2015–2020	1°	Arturo Murillo	UN	18 January 2015	30 November 2018	Carmen R. Guzmán	IND	23 January 2015	16 January 2020	2014	UD	(Note: Partisan of UN until 30 November 2018. Resigned to become minister of government.)	
2015–2020	1°	Arturo Murillo	IND	30 November 2018	13 November 2019	Carmen R. Guzmán	IND	23 January 2015	16 January 2020	2014	UD	(Note: Partisan of UN until 30 November 2018. Resigned to become minister of government.)	
2015–2020	1°	Carmen R. Guzmán	IND	16 January 2020	3 November 2020	Vacant		16 January 2020	3 November 2020	2014	UD		
2020–2025	1°	Leonardo Loza	MAS	3 November 2020	Incumbent	Lucy Escobar	MAS	9 November 2020	Incumbent	2020	MAS		
2020–2025	2°	Patricia Arce	MAS	3 November 2020	Incumbent	Hermo Pérez	MAS	9 November 2020	Incumbent	2020	MAS		
2020–2025	3°	Andrónico Rodríguez	MAS	3 November 2020	Incumbent	Dilma Cabrera	MAS	9 November 2020	Incumbent	2020	MAS		
2020–2025	1°	Andrea Barrientos	IND	3 November 2020	Incumbent	Guillermo Seoane	FRI	9 November 2020	Incumbent	2020	CC		(Note: Partisan of the FRI.)
