= Patricia Arce =

Bolivian lawyer and politician

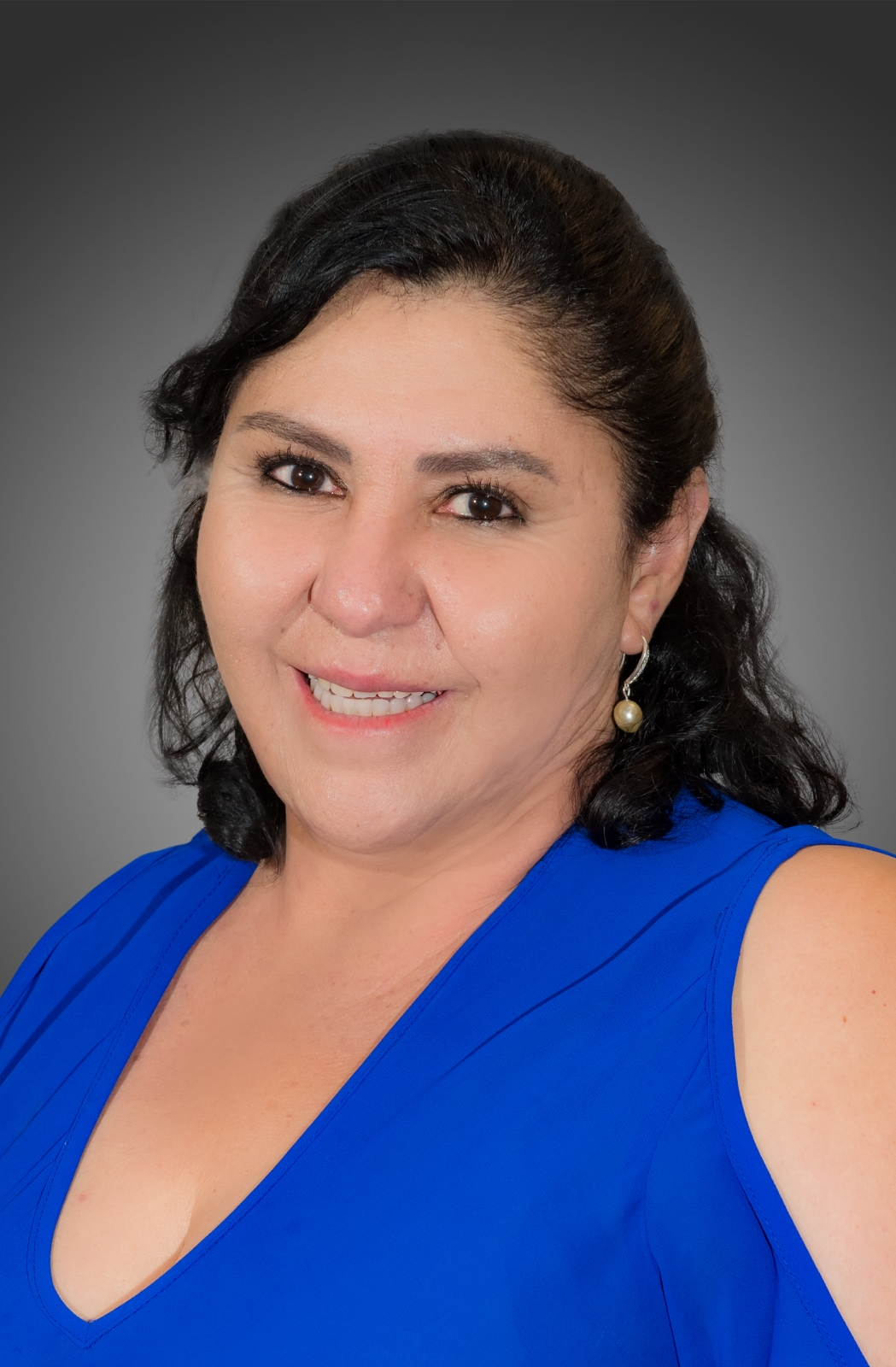

Senator for Cochabamba
- Incumbent
- Assumed office 3 November 2020 Serving with Andrea Barrientos, Leonardo Loza, and Andrónico Rodríguez
- Substitute: Hermo Pérez

Mayor of Vinto
- In office 30 May 2015 – 20 October 2020
- Succeeded by: Julieta Alcocer Gonzales

Personal details
- Born: María Patricia Arce Guzmán; 6 May 1970 (age 56) Quillacollo, Bolivia
- Party: Movimiento al Socialismo
- Occupation: Lawyer; politician

María Patricia Arce Guzmán (born 6 May 1970) is a Bolivian lawyer and politician serving as senator for Cochabamba since 2020. A member of Movimiento al Socialismo, she also served as mayor of Vinto from 2015 to 2020.

== Early life and career ==
Arce was born in Quillacollo on 6 May 1970, being the youngest of 10 siblings. After studying high school and automotive mechanics, she graduated as a lawyer and later became a tax assistant in Chapare and coordinator of the Rural Patrol Mobile Unit. She gave seminars and was an advisor to peasant communities and entities.

== Mayor of Vinto ==
Arce was invited to be a candidate for Solidarity Civic Unity, which she rejected, and in 2015, Evo Morales offered her to run for mayor of Vinto, a municipality where she had lived for two decades. She thus joined the Movimiento al Socialismo (MAS-IPSP) and won the local election.

Within the framework of the 2019 Bolivian political crisis, on 6 November, Arce was lynched in public when a group of protesters entered the Vinto Municipality building to forcefully expel her under accusations of "counteracting" citizen mobilizations with miners, burning plus government facilities. She was kidnapped by a mob and dragged down the street, being forced to walk barefoot for several kilometers and suffering various physical attacks when she was beaten, shaved, and sprayed with red paint all over her body. She was rescued by police officers and treated at a hospital in Capinota. Despite the facts, she continued in the position of mayor.

At the end of December 2019, the Inter-American Commission on Human Rights granted precautionary measures in favor of Arce and her children "after considering that they are in a serious and urgent situation of risk of irreparable damage to their rights", noting that Arce had not received any protection scheme from the Bolivian State.

== Chamber of Senators ==
In the 2020 general elections, in which the presidential binomial of the MAS (Luis Arce (no relation)-David Choquehuanca) triumphed, Arce was elected senator for the Department of Cochabamba for the 2020-2025 legislative period, occupying second place on the list of incumbent candidates for the MAS. She took office in November of the same year.

== Other work ==
In 2018, Arce had received the International Maya Award. She has worked as an Advisor to the Bartolina Sisa Women's Organization.
