= Apillapampa =

- Town
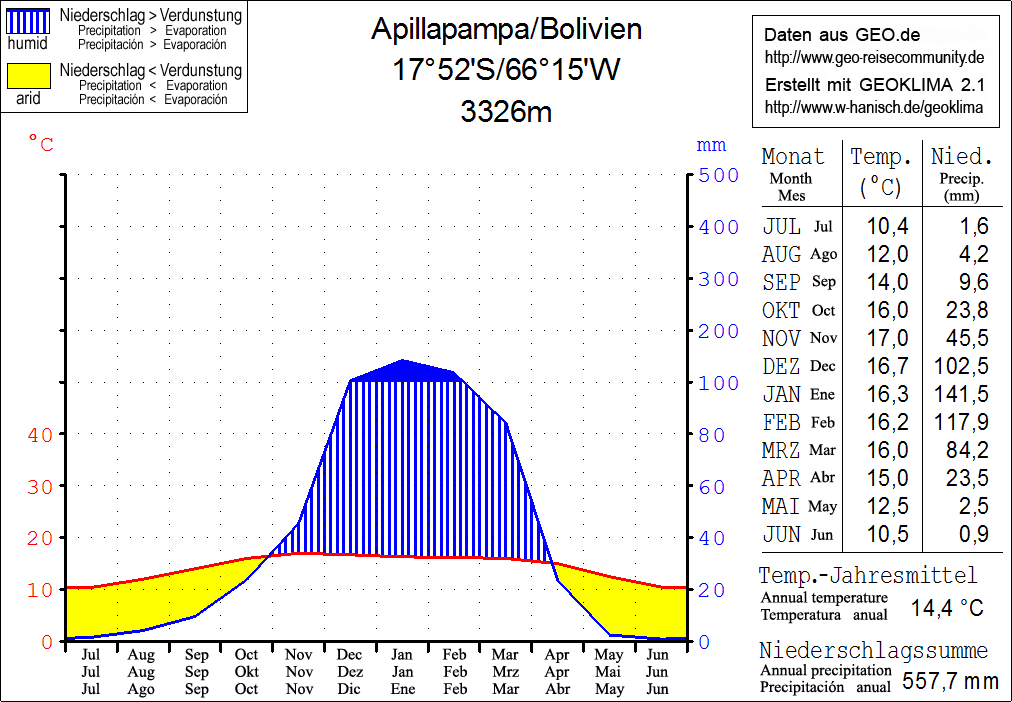
- Climate chart in the Walter and Lieth format, metric, °Celsius und millimeters, made with Geoklima 2.1

- Location within Bolivia
- Coordinates: 17°52′S 66°15′W
- Country: Bolivia
- Department: Cochabamba Department
- Province: Capinota Province
- Municipality: Capinota Municipality

Population (2001)
  - Total: 1,318
- Time zone: UTC-4 (BOT)

Apillapampa is a small town in Bolivia. In 2010 it had an estimated population of 1478.
