= Andrea Barrientos =

Bolivian Senator for Cochabamba (since 2020)

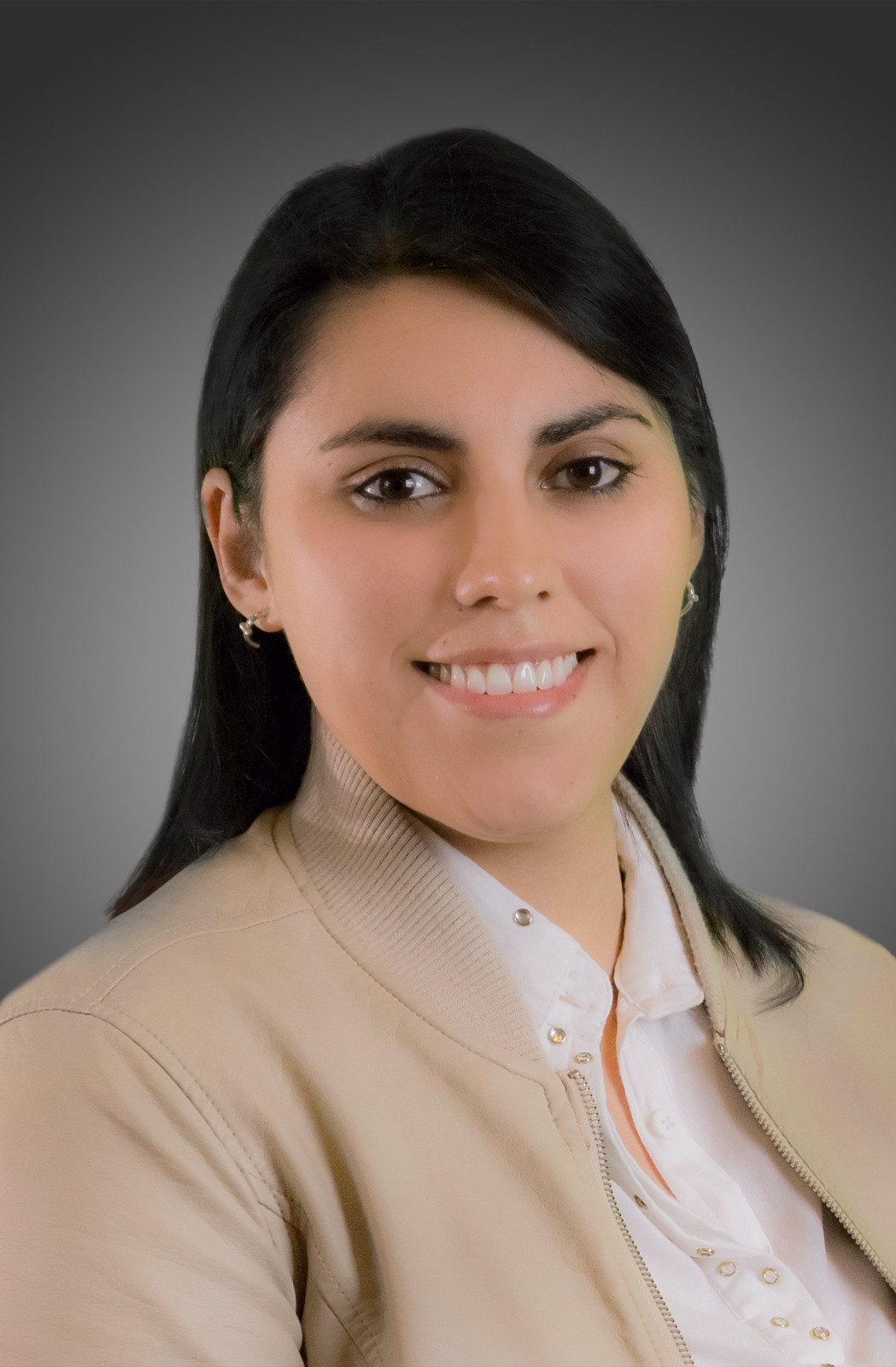

Senator for Cochabamba
- Incumbent
- Assumed office 3 November 2020 Serving with Leonardo Loza, Patricia Arce, and Andrónico Rodríguez
- Substitute: Guillermo Seoane
- Preceded by: Carmen Rosa Guzmán

Leader of the Senate Civic Community caucus
- In office 28 October 2020 – 10 September 2021
- Leader: Carlos Mesa
- Preceded by: Position established
- Succeeded by: Corina Ferreira

Personal details
- Born: Andrea Bruna Barrientos Sahonero; 30 March 1989 (age 36) Cochabamba, Bolivia
- Party: independent
- Education: Federico Froebel German School
- Alma mater: Bolivian Catholic University

Andrea Bruna Barrientos Sahonero (born 30 March 1989) is a Bolivian businesswoman, politician, and singer-songwriter serving as senator for Cochabamba since 2020. A member of Civic Community, she served as the leader of the alliance's caucus in the Senate from 2020 to 2021.

== Early life and career ==
Andrea Barrientos was born on 30 March 1989 in Cochabamba. Barrientos was educated at the Federico Froebel German School, where from a young age, she participated in volunteer and leadership activities aimed at environmental conservation. In high school, she assisted in various urban forestry projects, planting and maintaining trees in the streets and squares of Cochabamba. At the same time, Barrientos worked part-time with Terapéutica Puntiti, an organization dedicated to assisting children with learning disabilities. Barrientos attended the Bolivian Catholic University, where she graduated with degrees in Philosophy and Letters. As a university student, she involved herself in numerous United Nations programs, representing Bolivia at events in Mexico and Switzerland. In 2014, she joined the Cochabamba branch of Global Shapers Community, an international youth organization dedicated to developing projects surrounding political activism, education, environmentalism, and technology.

At the age of 15, she started the band Inédito. Upon entering university, Barrientos became a singer for the rock band Espiral, with which she has participated in multiple festivals and tours. During this time, she wrote songs for both herself and other popular Bolivian singers and bands. However, she eventually put an end to that life path to pursue an entrepreneurial career. She is the co-founder and chief innovation officer of the company Andes Business Solutions.

== Chamber of Senators ==
=== Elections ===
Barrientos entered the political sphere in late 2016 and early 2017 when she joined the D-19 youth platform, which stood in opposition to the Plurinational Constitutional Court's decision to allow President Evo Morales to run for a fourth term. Through a family friend, she began participating in political meetings, where she met César Virguetti, who invited her to join the national directorate of Civic Community (CC). In the 2019 general elections, CC presented Barrientos as its candidate for first senator for Cochabamba. Though the results of that election were annulled, she was once again presented in 2020, where she was elected as the only opposition senator in the department.

=== Tenure ===
At a plenary session of elected legislators of CC held in La Paz on 28 October 2020, Barrientos was elected as the leader of the alliance's caucus in the Chamber of Senators. Politically, she has aligned herself at the left wing of the coalition, making statements in support of women's and LGBT rights as well as the unrestricted legalization of abortion. She has also called for substantial educational, health, judicial, and tax reform. To combat the illicit drug trade, Barrientos proposed the legalization of medical marijuana, though she affirmed that any further steps would necessitate "a great national debate".

Unlike other opposition leaders, Barrientos was not entirely opposed to cooperating with the ruling Movement for Socialism (MAS-IPSP), stating: "we want to break that idea that the opposition opposes everything for the sake of it ... and that involves a constant dialogue with the MAS". In one statement at a Senate session, Barrientos stated that she "has more in common" with the MAS than with the right-wing Creemos. Those assertions garnered criticism from opposition politicians, including from within her own bloc, and led CC to publicly clarify that they were made in a "personal capacity". As a result, on 10 September 2021, she stepped down as CC's Senate leader in order to avoid potential divisions within the opposition.

During a debate in the Senate on 29 July 2021, La Paz Senator Hilarion Padilla stated that "I don't have to argue with [Barrientos], because in the end she is a woman", a statement Barrientos repudiated as "explicit machismo". The following day, Barrientos filed a complaint against Padilla with the Ethics Commission, saying that it was "extremely important that a precedent be established within the institution so that this doesn't repeat". She went on to consider that it was "unacceptable that we have sexist representatives" in government. Padilla later apologized and confirmed that he would appear before the Ethics Commission if summoned.

==== Commission assignments ====
- Plural Justice, Public Ministry, and Legal Defense of the State Commission
  - Public Ministry and Legal Defense of the State Committee (Secretary; 10 November 2021–present)
- Rural Indigenous Nations and Peoples, Cultures, and Interculturality Commission
  - Culture, Interculturality, and Cultural Heritage Committee (Secretary; 10 November 2020–10 November 2021)

== Electoral history ==
Year	Office	Alliance	Votes			Result	Ref.
Year	Office	Alliance	Total	%	P.	Result	Ref.
2019	Senator	Civic Community	369,156	32.21%	2nd (Note: Presented on an electoral list. The data shown represents the share of the vote the entire party/alliance received in that constituency.)	Annulled	
2020	Senator	Civic Community	371,826	31.68%	2nd	Won	
Source: Plurinational Electoral Organ | Electoral Atlas

Party political offices
Position established	Leader of the Senate; Civic Community caucus 2020–2021	Succeeded by Corina Ferreira
Senate of Bolivia
Preceded by Carmen Rosa Guzmán	Senator for Cochabamba; 2020–present Served alongside: Leonardo Loza, Patricia Arce, Andrónico Rodríguez	Incumbent
