= Irpa Irpa =

- Town
- Location within Bolivia
- Coordinates: 17°43′S 66°17′W
- Country: Bolivia
- Department: Cochabamba Department
- Province: Capinota Province
- Municipality: Capinota Municipality
- Canton: Capinota Canton

Population (2001)
  - Total: 2,721
- Time zone: UTC-4 (BOT)

Irpa Irpa is a small town in Bolivia.
