= Waña Quta (Cochabamba) =

- Location within Cochabamba Location within Bolivia Location within South America
- Interactive map of Waña Quta
- Location: Bolivia; Cochabamba Department, Capinota Province
- Coordinates: 17°33′20″S 66°09′20″W
- Surface elevation: 2,752 m (9,029 ft)

Waña Quta (Aymara waña dry, quta lake, "dry lake", Hispanicized spellings Huanacota, Guañacoba, Guañacota, Huañacota, Huna Khota) is a lake in Bolivia located in the Cochabamba Department, Capinota Province, Santiváñez Municipality, Waña Quta Canton and Santiváñez Canton. It is situated south east of the village Waña Quta and east of the town Santiváñez at a height of about 2,752 metres (9,029 ft).
