= List of senators of Beni =

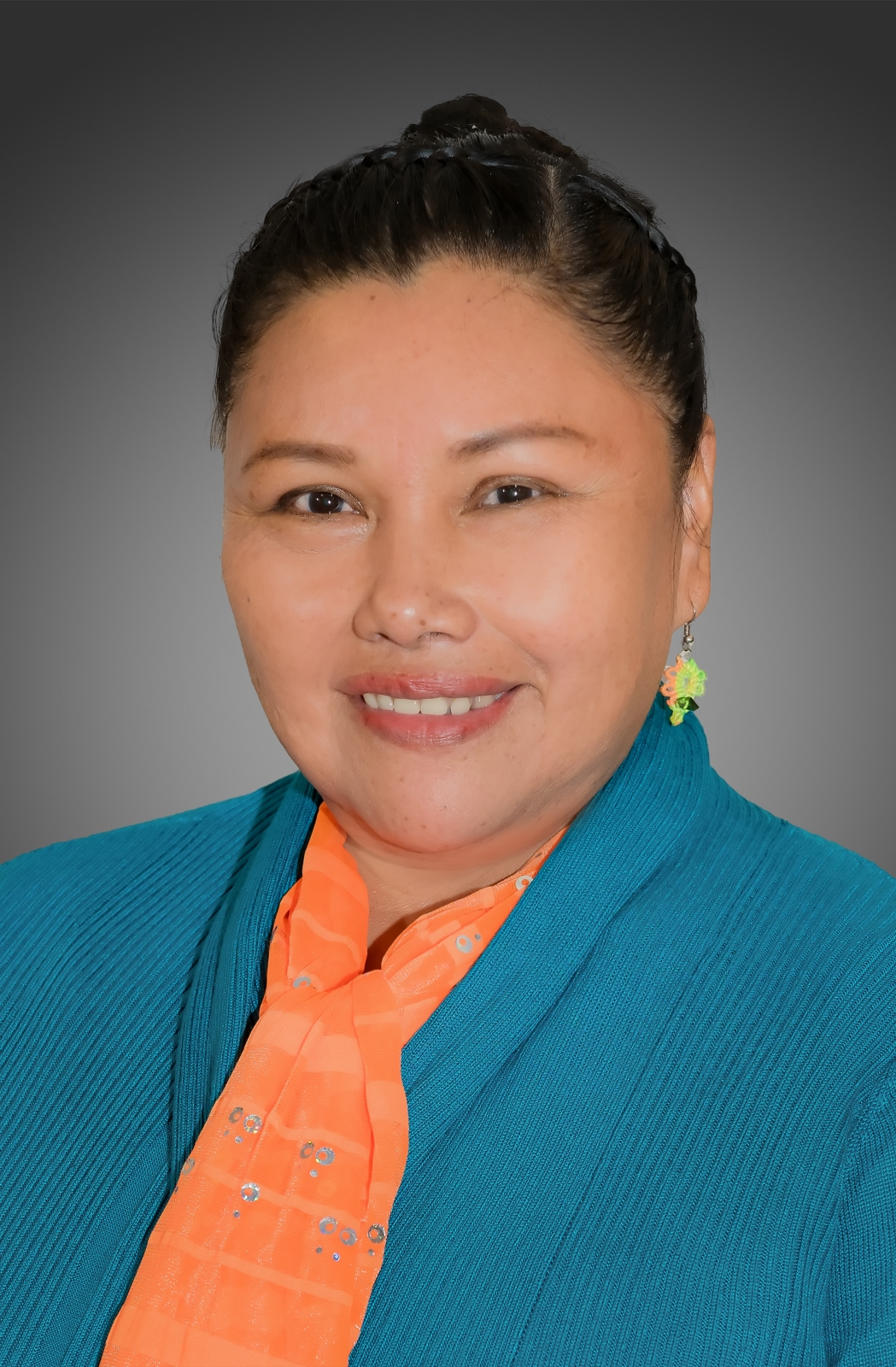
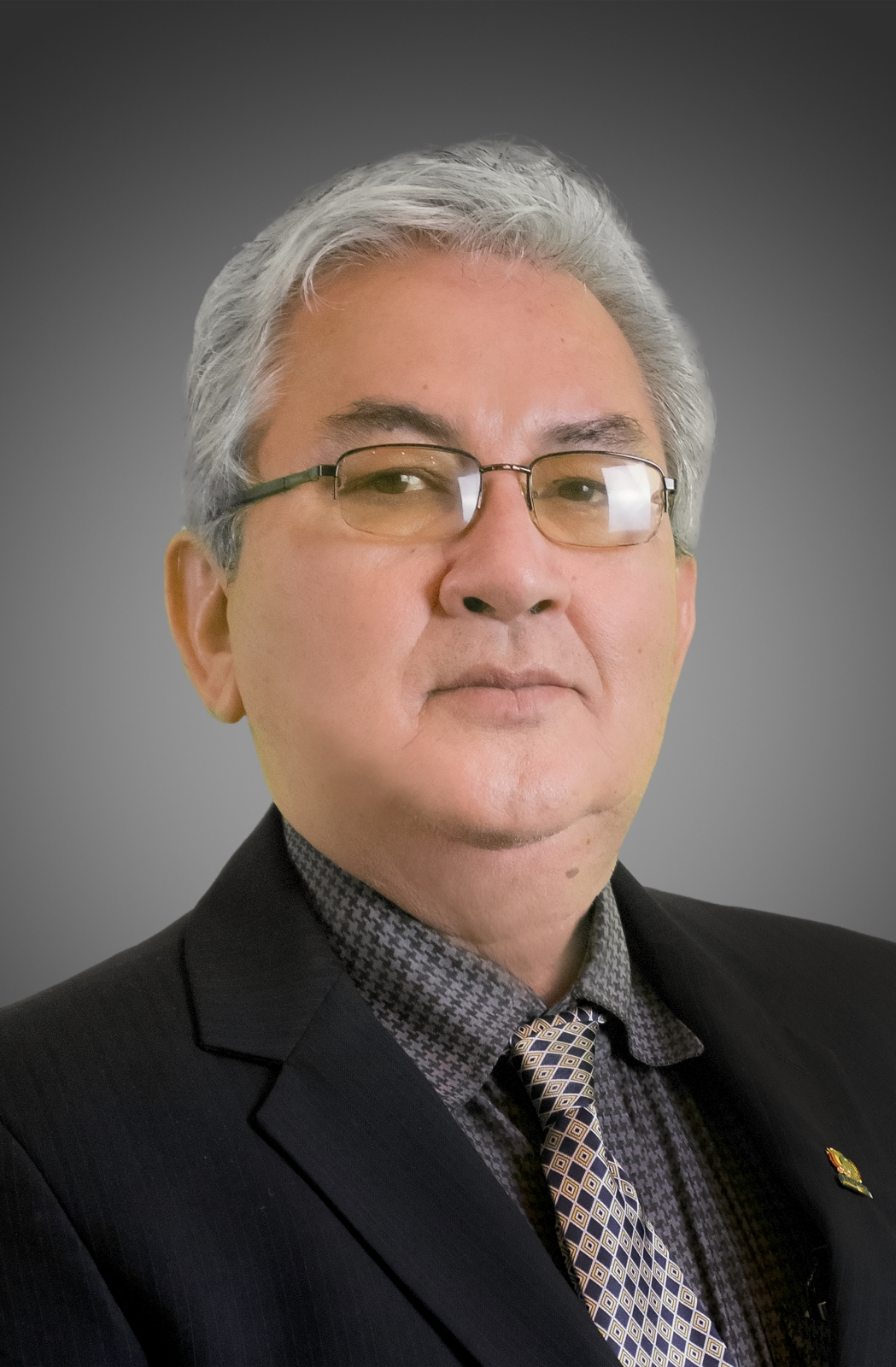
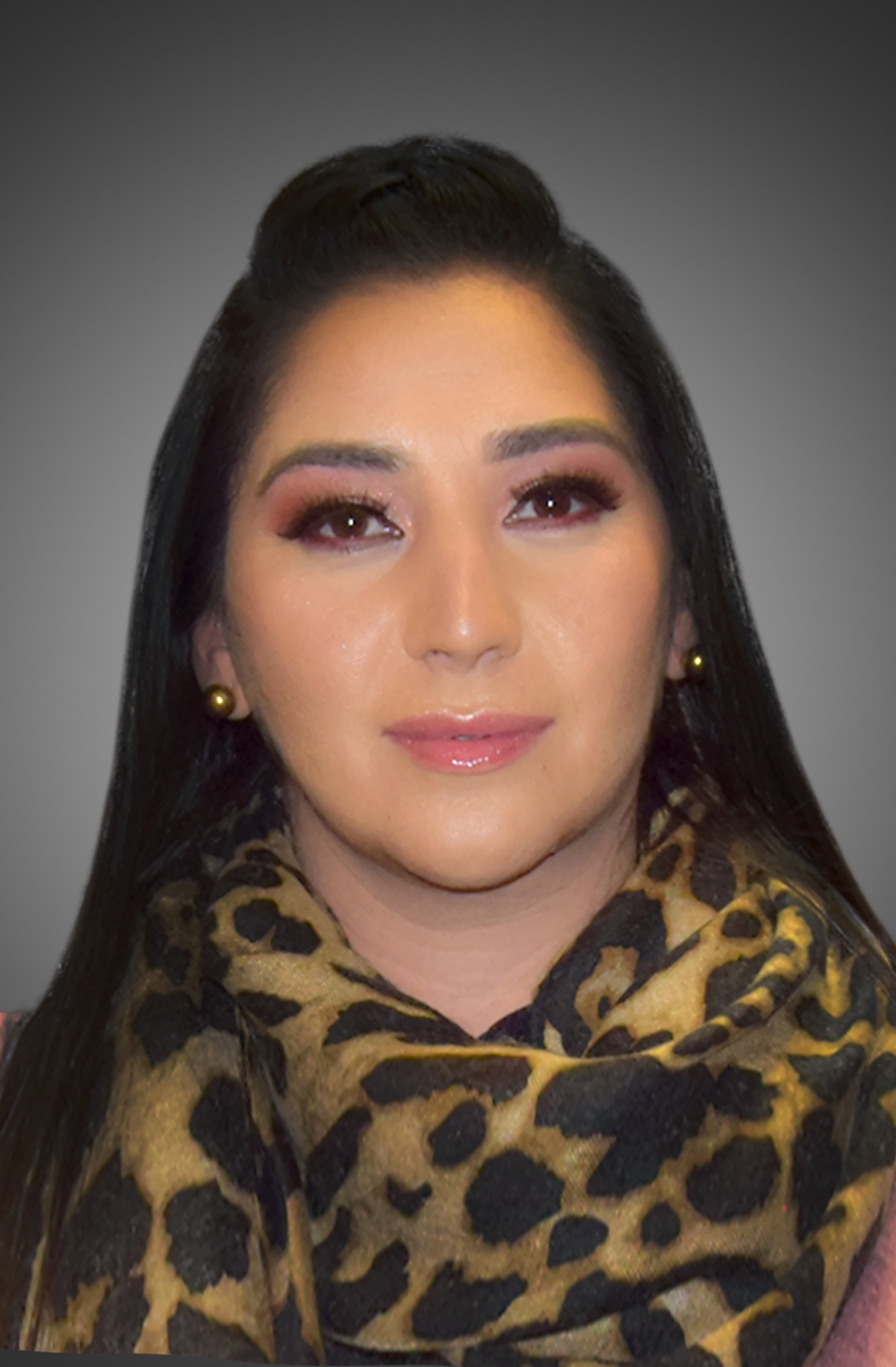
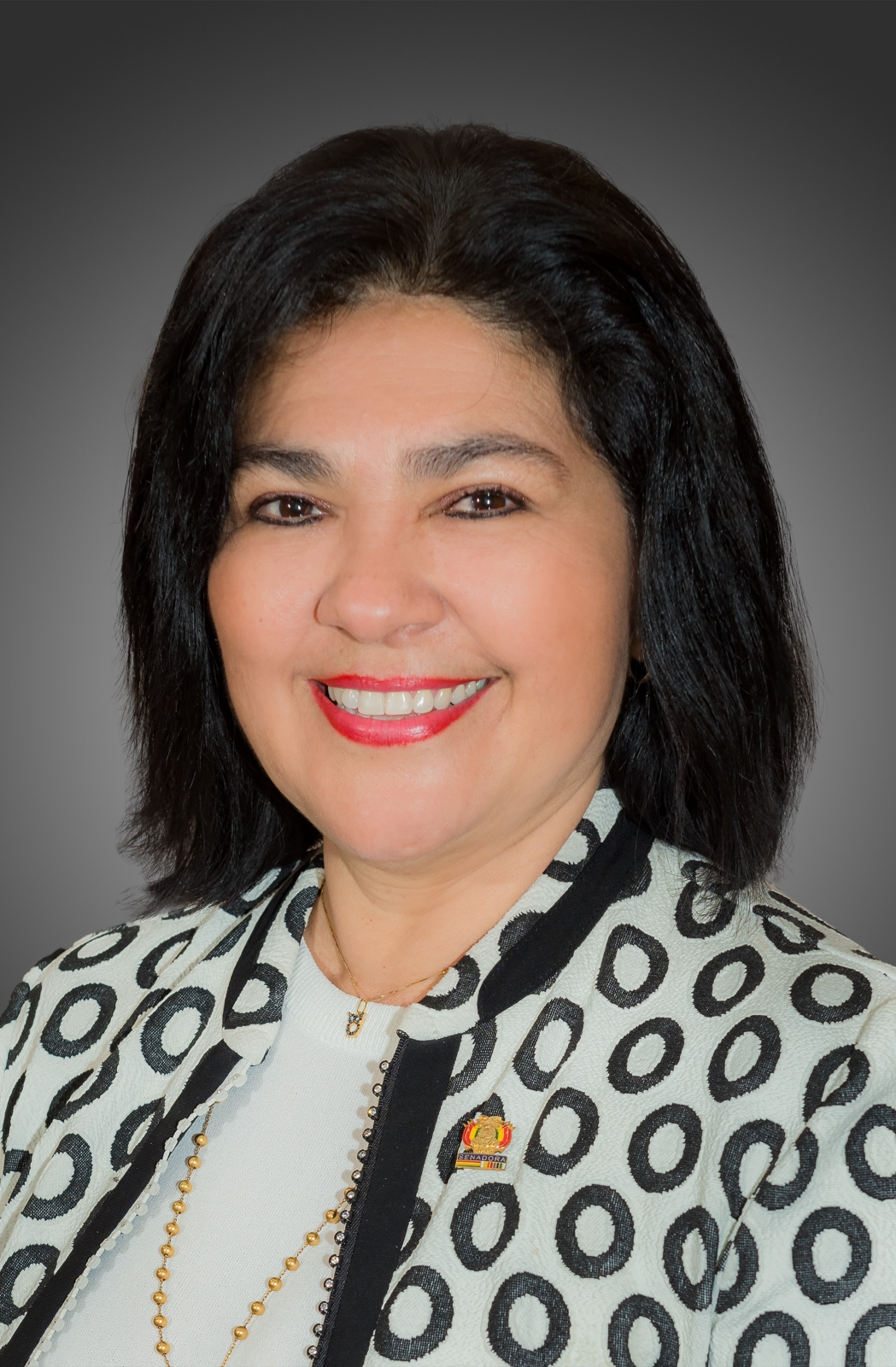
From left to right, top to bottom: Cecilia Myoviri (CC), Walter Justiniano (CC), Suka Nacif (MAS), and Claudia Égüez (CRMS).

Beni is represented in the Plurinational Legislative Assembly by four senators and their substitutes elected through proportional representation. They serve five-year terms and qualify for reelection indefinitely. The current delegation comprises two senators from Civic Community (CC), one from the Movement for Socialism (MAS-IPSP), and one from Creemos: Cecilia Moyoviri, Walter Justiniano, Suka Nacif, and Claudia Égüez. Their respective substitutes are: Fernando Vaca, Neila Velarde, Misdrael Mamani, and Javier Villavicencio. Although the bicameral system was adopted in the 1831 Constitution and was maintained in subsequently promulgated constitutions, it can be affirmed that with the exception of very small intervals, the Senate did not, in fact, exercise its functions until the convocation of the 1882 legislature. Furthermore, due to heavy political instability and frequent military interventions since 1882, Bolivia did not experience a continuous, uninterrupted legislative session until 1982.

== List of senators ==
Legislature	L.	Senator	Party	Term of office		Substitute	Party	Term of office		E.	Caucus	Ref.	
Legislature	L.	Senator	Party	Took office	Left office	Substitute	Party	Took office	Left office	E.	Caucus	Sen.	Sub.
2020–2025	1°	Cecilia Moyoviri	IND	3 November 2020	Incumbent	Fernando Vaca	IND	9 November 2020	Incumbent	2020	CC		
2020–2025	2°	Walter Justiniano	IND	3 November 2020	Incumbent	Neila Velarde	IND	9 November 2020	Incumbent	2020	CC		
2020–2025	1°	Suka Nacif	MAS	3 November 2020	Incumbent	Misdrael Mamani	MAS	9 November 2020	Incumbent	2020	MAS		
2020–2025	1°	Claudia Égüez	IND	3 November 2020	Incumbent	Javier Villavicencio	IND	9 November 2020	Incumbent	2020	CRMS		
