= Senator Gutierrez =

Senator Gutierrez may refer to:

== Bolivia (Chamber of Senators) ==
- Bernard Gutiérrez (born 1972), senator for Cochabamba

== Colombia (Senate of the Republic) ==
- Nancy Patricia Gutiérrez (born 1963)

== Guam (Senate of Guam) ==
- Carl Gutierrez (born 1941)
- Franklin J. Gutierrez

== Mexico (Senate of the Republic) ==
- Alejandro Gutiérrez Gutiérrez (born 1956), senator for Coahuila
- Daniel Gutiérrez Castorena (born 1954), senator for Aguascalientes
- Dolores Gutiérrez Zurita (born 1963), senator for Tabasco
- Fernando Gutiérrez Barrios (1927–2000), senator for Veracruz

== Spain (Spanish Senate) ==
- Antonio Gutiérrez Limones (born 1963)

== United States ==
- Jaime Gutierrez (born 1949), Arizona State Senate
- Roland Gutierrez (born 1970), Texas State Senate

== Venezuela (former Senate of the Republic) ==
- José Bernabé Gutiérrez (born 1952), senator for Amazonas
