= Sicaya Municipality =

- Municipality
- Flag

- Location within Bolivia
- Coordinates: 17°46′S 66°21′W
- Country: Bolivia
- Department: Cochabamba Department
- Province: Capinota Province
- Seat: Sicaya

Government
  - Mayor: Dario Mamani Zenteno (2007)
  - President: Justiniano Catorceno Valencia (2007)
- Elevation: 8,500 ft (2,600 m)

Population (2001)
  - Total: 2,235
  - Ethnicities: Quechua
- Time zone: UTC-4 (BOT)

Sicaya Municipality is the third municipal section of the Capinota Province in the Cochabamba Department in Bolivia. Its seat is Sicaya.

== Subdivision ==
Sicaya Municipality is divided into two cantons.

Canton	Inhabitants (2001)	Seat
Sicaya Canton	1,714	Sicaya
Orcoma Canton	521	Orcoma

== See also ==
- Kuntur Wachana
