= Kuntur Wachana (Bolivia) =

Mountain in Bolivia

- Location within Bolivia

Highest point
- Elevation: 3,396 m (11,142 ft)
- Coordinates: 17°42′44″S 66°21′06″W

Geography
- Location: Bolivia, Cochabamba Department
- Parent range: Andes

Kuntur Wachana (Quechua kuntur condor, wacha birth, to give birth, -na a suffix, 'where the condor is born', also spelled Condor Huachana) is a 3,396-metre-high (11,142 ft) mountain in the Bolivian Andes. It is located in the Cochabamba Department, Capinota Province, Sicaya Municipality.
