= Santiváñez Municipality =

- Municipality
- Location within Bolivia
- Coordinates: 17°34′S 66°14′W
- Country: Bolivia
- Department: Cochabamba Department
- Province: Capinota Province
- Seat: Santivañez

Government
  - Mayor: Angel Villarroel Loza (2007)
  - President: Casiano Choque Cartagena (2007)
- Elevation: 8,500 ft (2,600 m)

Population (2001)
  - Total: 6,402
- Time zone: UTC-4 (BOT)

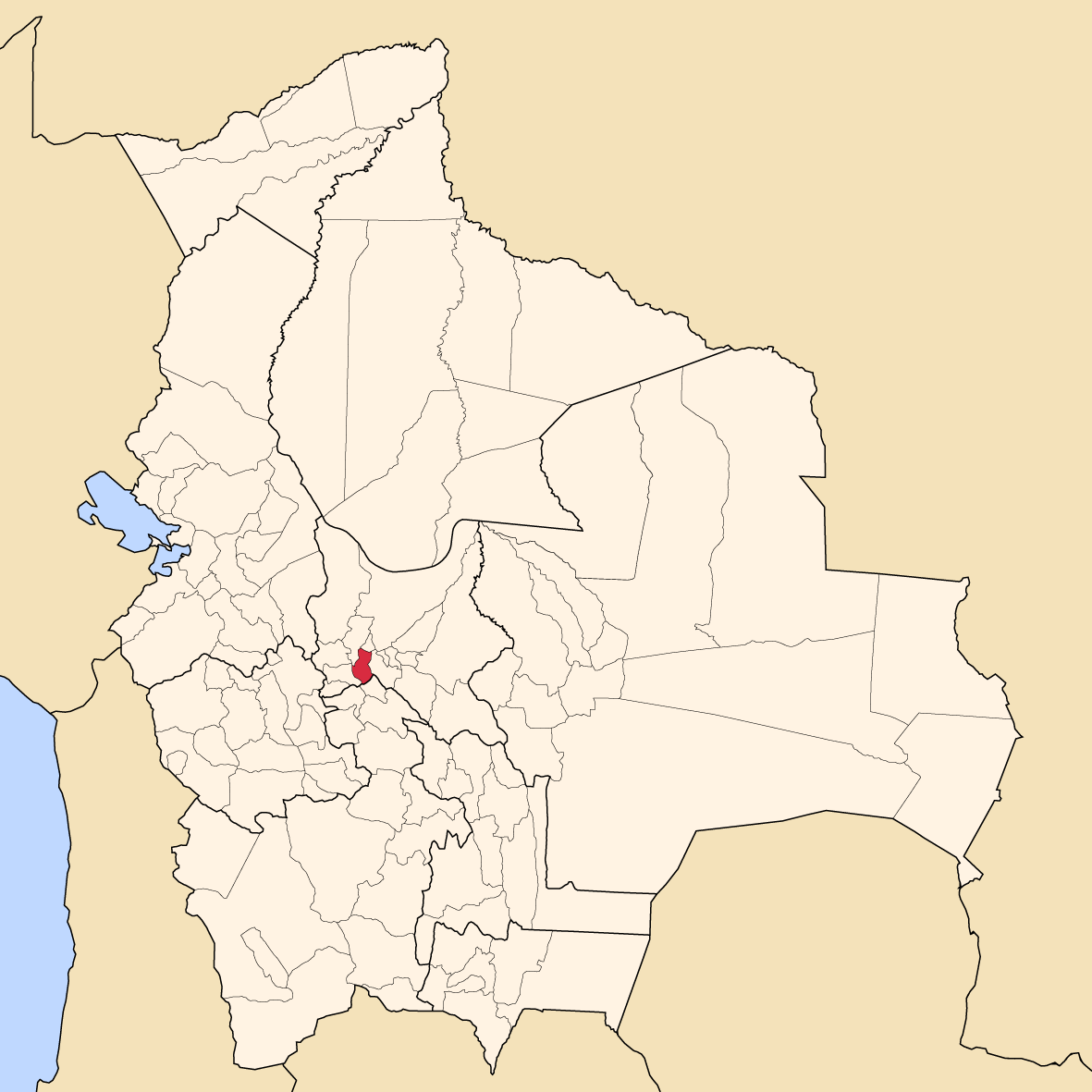

Santiváñez Municipality is the second municipal section of the Capinota Province in the Cochabamba Department, Bolivia. Its seat is Santiváñez.

== Subdivision ==
Santiváñez Municipality is divided into seven cantons.

Canton	Inhabitants (2001)
Calera Canton	32
Caporaya Canton	620
Caraza Canton	457
Chojtama Canton	632
Poquera Canton	375
Santiváñez Canton	3.793
Waña Quta Canton	493

== Climate ==
Climate data for Santiváñez, elevation 2,540 m (8,330 ft)
Month	Jan	Feb	Mar	Apr	May	Jun	Jul	Aug	Sep	Oct	Nov	Dec	Year
Record high °C (°F)	36.7 (98.1)	37.1 (98.8)	37.8 (100.0)	37.8 (100.0)	37.8 (100.0)	32.2 (90.0)	36.7 (98.1)	37.2 (99.0)	35.0 (95.0)	36.1 (97.0)	37.8 (100.0)	37.2 (99.0)	37.8 (100.0)
Mean daily maximum °C (°F)	25.1 (77.2)	24.1 (75.4)	26.5 (79.7)	26.7 (80.1)	26.3 (79.3)	24.4 (75.9)	25.5 (77.9)	25.5 (77.9)	26.3 (79.3)	26.7 (80.1)	24.9 (76.8)	25.0 (77.0)	25.6 (78.1)
Daily mean °C (°F)	18.1 (64.6)	17.6 (63.7)	18.0 (64.4)	16.2 (61.2)	14.2 (57.6)	12.4 (54.3)	12.8 (55.0)	13.8 (56.8)	15.7 (60.3)	16.8 (62.2)	16.6 (61.9)	18.0 (64.4)	15.9 (60.5)
Mean daily minimum °C (°F)	9.7 (49.5)	8.8 (47.8)	8.0 (46.4)	5.4 (41.7)	2.1 (35.8)	0.3 (32.5)	0.0 (32.0)	2.1 (35.8)	5.0 (41.0)	7.0 (44.6)	8.0 (46.4)	9.3 (48.7)	5.5 (41.9)
Record low °C (°F)	−2.2 (28.0)	−3.3 (26.1)	−3.3 (26.1)	−5.5 (22.1)	−7.9 (17.8)	−8.5 (16.7)	−7.9 (17.8)	−11.0 (12.2)	−9.0 (15.8)	−4.0 (24.8)	−1.1 (30.0)	−1.1 (30.0)	−11.0 (12.2)
Average precipitation mm (inches)	140.0 (5.51)	96.8 (3.81)	83.5 (3.29)	18.1 (0.71)	1.2 (0.05)	1.6 (0.06)	1.0 (0.04)	6.0 (0.24)	5.2 (0.20)	15.2 (0.60)	36.2 (1.43)	114.3 (4.50)	519.1 (20.44)
Average precipitation days	14	10	9	4	1	1	0	1	2	3	6	14	65
Source: Servicio Nacional de Meteorología e Hidrología de Bolivia

== See also ==
- Waña Quta
