= Puka Mayu (Cochabamba) =

- Etymology: Quechua

Location
- Country: Bolivia
- Region: Cochabamba Department

Physical characteristics
- Mouth: Caine River

The Puka Mayu (Quechua puka red, mayu river, "red river") is a Bolivian river in the Cochabamba Department, Capinota Province, Capinota Municipality. It is a tributary of the Caine River.
