= Sicaya, Cochabamba =

Sicaya
- Location of Sicaya within Bolivia
- Coordinates: 17°46′0″S 66°18′0″W
- Country: Bolivia
- Department: Cochabamba Department
- Province: Capinota Province
- Municipality: Sicaya Municipality
- Canton: Sicaya Canton

Population
  - Total: 374
- Time zone: UTC-4 (BOT)

Sicaya or Silaya is a locality in the Cochabamba Department in central Bolivia. It is the seat of the Sicaya Municipality, the third municipal section of the Capinota Province.
