= César Virguetti =

Bolivian politician (1955–2021)

Member of the Chamber of Deputies from Cochabamba circumscription 20
- In office 3 November 2020 – 29 June 2021
- Substitute: Mayra Zalles
- Preceded by: Víctor Gutiérrez
- Succeeded by: Mayra Zalles

Personal details
- Born: César Augusto Virguetti Pinto; 17 June 1955 Cochabamba, Bolivia
- Died: 29 June 2021 (aged 66) Cochabamba, Bolivia
- Cause of death: COVID-19
- Party: Civic Community (2018–2021)
- Other political affiliations: Revolutionary Left Movement; Free Bolivia Movement
- Children: 2
- Education: Higher University of San Simón
- Occupation: Politician; sociologist

César Augusto Virguetti Pinto (17 June 1955 – 29 June 2021) was a Bolivian sociologist and politician who served as a uninominal member of the Chamber of Deputies from Cochabamba representing circumscription 20 from 2020 until his death from COVID-19 in 2021. He was a member of Civic Community.

== Early life and career ==
César Virguetti was born on 17 June 1955 in Cochabamba. He studied sociology at the Higher University of San Simón, where he began his political activity fighting for the recovery of democracy in the country. In 1980, during the dictatorship of Luis García Meza, he was a member of an underground student committee aimed at recovering university autonomy from the government. A sociologist by profession, he later returned to the Higher University of San Simón as a professor at the Faculty of Humanities.

From 1982 to 1984, he served as executive secretary of the Association of Promotion and Education Institutions OF Cochabamba. Later, from 1993 to 2003, he was the executive director and the city's Center for Research, Promotion, and Development. An active members of the Revolutionary Left Movement and Free Bolivia Movement, he worked as executive secretary of the Cochabamba Mayor's Office from 2006 to 2007. Additionally, he worked as a researcher and consultant for various NGOs.

== Chamber of Deputies ==
In 2019, Virguetti participated in the foundation of the Cochabamba branch of the Civic Community (CC) alliance, serving in the front's departmental directorate. That year, he was elected as a deputy for Cochabamba in circumscription 20, though the results were annulled in the midst of a political crisis. In the rerun elections in October 2020, Virguetti achieved a second victory in the same district, winning over sixty percent of the vote.

An avid environmentalist, he served on the Chamber of Deputies' Science and Technology Committee during his brief tenure.

=== Commission assignments ===
- Planning, Economic Policy, and Finance Commission
  - Science and Technology Committee

== Health issues and death ==
In mid-2021, Virguetti contracted COVID-19 and was interned at a medical center in Cochabamba. After over a month in intensive care, he had a stroke as a complication of the virus and died on 29 June 2021. CC leader Carlos Mesa recalled that he was a "tireless fighter for democracy and human rights". Virguetti was married and had two children.

== Electoral history ==
Year	Office	Alliance	Votes			Result	Ref.
Year	Office	Alliance	Total	%	P.	Result	Ref.
2019	Deputy	Civic Community	87,780	64.65%	1st	Annulled	
2020	Deputy	Civic Community	95,917	66.63%	1st	Won	
Source: Plurinational Electoral Organ | Electoral Atlas

Chamber of Deputies of Bolivia
Preceded by Víctor Gutiérrez	Member of the Chamber of Deputies from Cochabamba circumscription 20; 2020–2021	Vacant Title next held by Mayra Zalles
