= Corina Ferreira =

Bolivian Senator for Pando (since 2020)

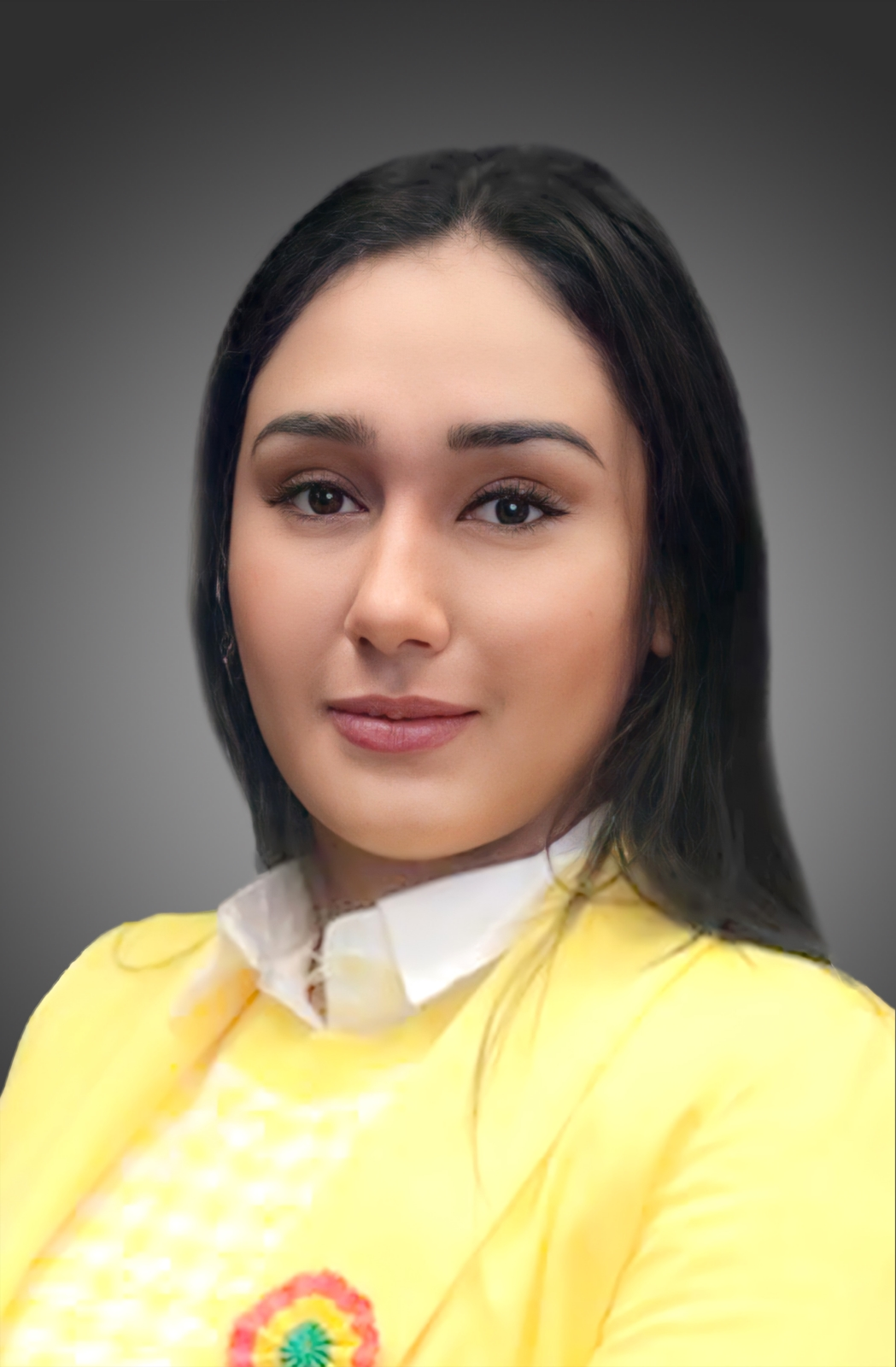

Senator for Pando
- Incumbent
- Assumed office 3 November 2020 Serving with Eva Humérez, Luis Adolfo Flores, and Julio Romaña
- Substitute: Walter Buitrago
- Preceded by: Carmen Eva Gonzales

Leader of the Senate Civic Community caucus
- In office 14 September 2021 – 3 November 2021
- Leader: Carlos Mesa
- Preceded by: Andrea Barrientos
- Succeeded by: Guillermo Seoane

Personal details
- Born: Corina Ferreira Domínguez; 8 December 1989 (age 36) Cobija, Pando, Bolivia
- Party: Civic Community
- Parent: William Ferreira (father)
- Relatives: Leopoldo Fernández
- Education: Private Technological University of Santa Cruz

Corina Ferreira Domínguez (born 8 December 1989) is a Bolivian businesswoman, model, and politician serving as senator for Pando since 2020. A member of Civic Community, she served as the leader of the alliance's caucus in the Senate in 2021 and, aged thirty-one at her entry, is the youngest legislator in the upper house. Prior to entering politics, she worked as a professional model and was crowned Miss Pando 2009.

== Early life and career ==
Corina Ferreira was born on 8 December 1989 in Cobija, Pando. She is the daughter of William Ferreira, though they shared no familial relationship since she was four; between 2006 and 2008, he served as a government contractor under his cousin, Pando Prefect Leopoldo Fernández, later obtaining asylum in Epitaciolândia, Acre following the Porvenir massacre. Ferreira was educated at the Private Technological University of Santa Cruz, where she graduated with a degree in International Relations. From 2009 to 2012, she worked as a professional model, representing various brands in multiple countries. In 2009, she was crowned Miss Pando and participated in that year's Miss Bolivia competition. After that, she became an entrepreneur, starting two businesses dedicated to the sale of beauty items, clothing, and gastronomy.

== Chamber of Senators ==
=== Elections ===
During her time in university, Ferreira became a supporter of former president Carlos Mesa. When Mesa presented his presidential candidacy on behalf of the Civic Community (CC) alliance, she joined the coalition as its departmental coordinator in Pando. In the 2019 general elections, CC presented an all-women roster to top its senatorial party list, with Ferreira as its candidate for first senator for Pando. Though the results of that election were annulled, she was once again presented in 2020. In winning that election, she became the youngest legislator in the Senate at thirty-one years old.

=== Tenure ===
Prior to taking office, CC elected Ferreira as the alliance's deputy leader in the Chamber of Senators. In accordance with its internal regulations, she assumed the leadership of CC's Senate caucus on 14 September 2021, succeeding Andrea Barrientos, who resigned four days prior after a minor controversy. Ferreira affirmed that CC was "satisfied with the work that Andrea did as [its] head", considering the case closed and maintaining that it had not affected the opposition's unity. She held the post until the renewal of CC's directive on 3 November, when Guillermo Seoane was chosen to lead it for the 2021 to 2022 Senate session.

Ferreira's agenda in the Senate prioritized issues of interconnectivity between Pando and the other departments of the country. She has advocated for the expansion of Pando's domestic production sector in order to create new jobs and reduce the amount of natural resources being processed in other departments, stating: "we cannot allow our natural resources to continue to be pillaged without a penny arriving as a royalty". Ferreira has also called for an increase in Pando's health budget and the connection of its electrical grid with the national system.

==== Commission assignments ====
- Plural Economy, Production, Industry, and Industrialization Commission
  - Plural Economy, Productive Development, Public Works, and Infrastructure Committee (Secretary; 10 November 2021–present)
- International Policy Commission
  - International Economic Relations Committee (Secretary; 10 November 2020 – 10 November 2021)

== Electoral history ==
| Year | Office | Alliance | Votes | | | Result | Ref. |
| Year | Office | Alliance | Total | % | P. | Result | Ref. |
|---|---|---|---|---|---|---|---|
| 2019 | Senator | Civic Community | 23,271 | 40.22% | 2nd (Note: Presented on an electoral list. The data shown represents the share of the vote the entire party/alliance received in that constituency.) | Annulled | |
| 2020 | Senator | Civic Community | 14,635 | 25.89% | 3rd | Won | |
Source: Plurinational Electoral Organ | Electoral Atlas

Awards and achievements
| Preceded by Paula Alexis Camacho | Miss Pando; 2009 | Succeeded by Susan Herrera Clavijo |
Party political offices
| Preceded by Andrea Barrientos | Leader of the Senate; Civic Community caucus 2021 | Succeeded by Guillermo Seoane |
Senate of Bolivia
| Preceded by Carmen Rosa Guzmán | Senator for Pando; 2020–present Served alongside: Eva Humérez, Luis Adolfo Flores, Julio Romaña | Incumbent |
