= Caine River =

River in Bolivia

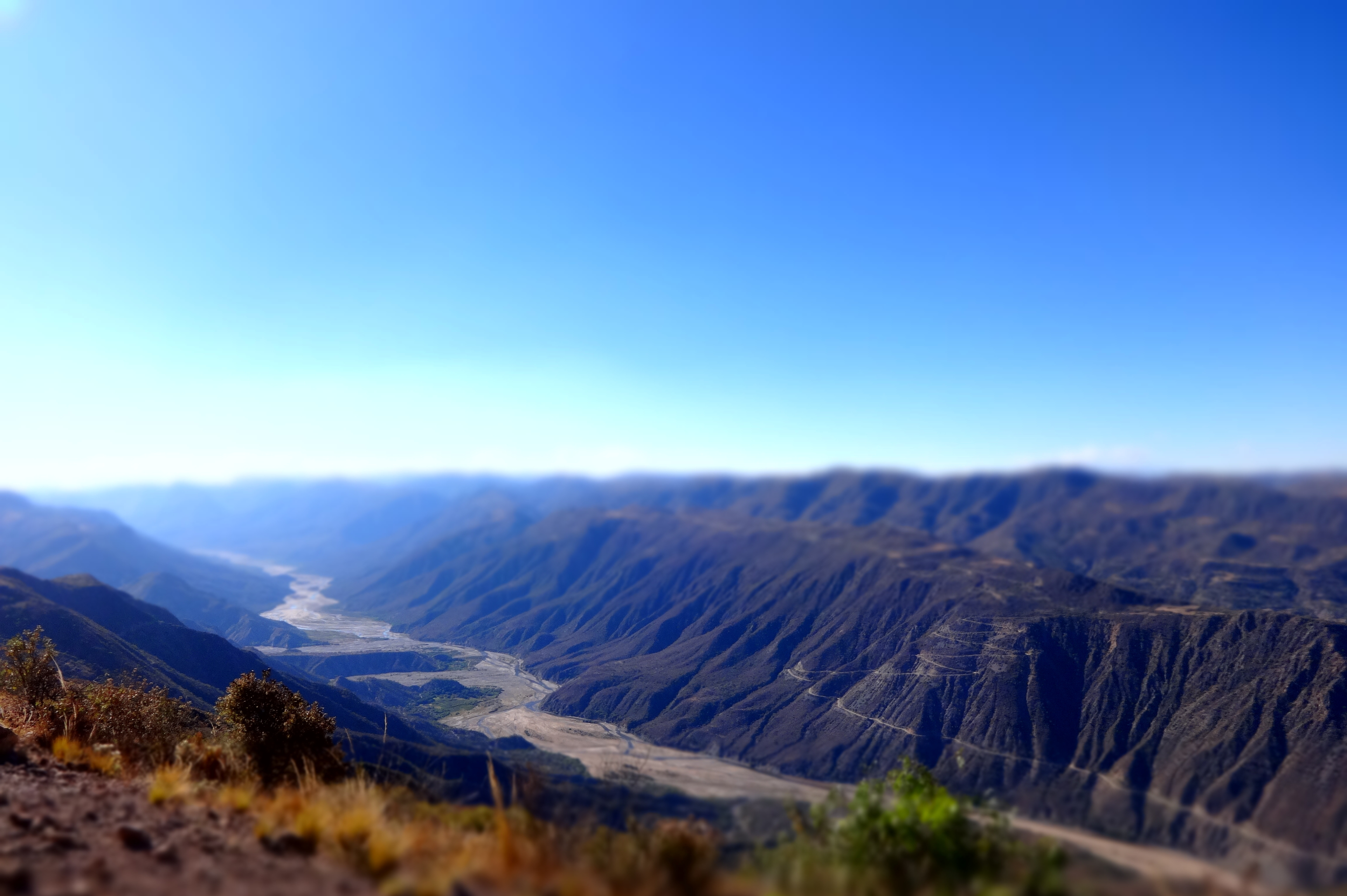

Location
- Country: Bolivia
- Region: Cochabamba Department, Potosí Department

Physical characteristics
- Source
  - coordinates: 17°42′11″S 66°14′39″W

The Caine is a river located in the eastern cordilleras of the Bolivian Andes in South America. It flows through the Cochabamba Department and the Potosí Department.

Verlauf des Río Caine

At one point, Caine joins San Pedro River from the left, boosting the flow by 80% to form the Río Grande.

== See also ==
- Jaya Mayu
- Puka Mayu
