= Capinota Municipality =

- Municipality
- Location within Bolivia
- Coordinates: 17°46′S 66°14′W
- Country: Bolivia
- Department: Cochabamba Department
- Province: Capinota Province
- Seat: Capinota

Population (2001)
  - Total: 16,945
  - Ethnicities: Quechuas
- Time zone: UTC-4 (BOT)

Capinota Municipality is the first municipal section of the Capinota Province in the Cochabamba Department, Bolivia. Its seat is Capinota.

== See also ==
- Puka Mayu
