= Santiváñez =

- Location of Santiváñez within Bolivia Santiváñez (Cochabamba)
- Coordinates: 17°33′0″S 66°15′0″W
- Country: Bolivia
- Department: Cochabamba Department
- Province: Capinota Province
- Municipality: Santiváñez Municipality
- Canton: Santiváñez Canton

Population (2001)
  - Total: 1,046
- Time zone: UTC-4 (BOT)

Santiváñez is a locality in the Cochabamba Department in central Bolivia. It is the capital of Santiváñez Municipality, the second municipal section of the Capinota Province. At the time of census 2001 it had a population of 1,046.

== Climate ==
Climate data for Santiváñez, elevation 2,540 m (8,330 ft)
Month	Jan	Feb	Mar	Apr	May	Jun	Jul	Aug	Sep	Oct	Nov	Dec	Year
Record high °C (°F)	36.7 (98.1)	37.1 (98.8)	37.8 (100.0)	37.8 (100.0)	37.8 (100.0)	32.2 (90.0)	36.7 (98.1)	37.2 (99.0)	35.0 (95.0)	36.1 (97.0)	37.8 (100.0)	37.2 (99.0)	37.8 (100.0)
Mean daily maximum °C (°F)	25.1 (77.2)	24.1 (75.4)	26.5 (79.7)	26.7 (80.1)	26.3 (79.3)	24.4 (75.9)	25.5 (77.9)	25.5 (77.9)	26.3 (79.3)	26.7 (80.1)	24.9 (76.8)	25.0 (77.0)	25.6 (78.1)
Daily mean °C (°F)	18.1 (64.6)	17.6 (63.7)	18.0 (64.4)	16.2 (61.2)	14.2 (57.6)	12.4 (54.3)	12.8 (55.0)	13.8 (56.8)	15.7 (60.3)	16.8 (62.2)	16.6 (61.9)	18.0 (64.4)	15.9 (60.5)
Mean daily minimum °C (°F)	9.7 (49.5)	8.8 (47.8)	8.0 (46.4)	5.4 (41.7)	2.1 (35.8)	0.3 (32.5)	0.0 (32.0)	2.1 (35.8)	5.0 (41.0)	7.0 (44.6)	8.0 (46.4)	9.3 (48.7)	5.5 (41.9)
Record low °C (°F)	−2.2 (28.0)	−3.3 (26.1)	−3.3 (26.1)	−5.5 (22.1)	−7.9 (17.8)	−8.5 (16.7)	−7.9 (17.8)	−11.0 (12.2)	−9.0 (15.8)	−4.0 (24.8)	−1.1 (30.0)	−1.1 (30.0)	−11.0 (12.2)
Average precipitation mm (inches)	140.0 (5.51)	96.8 (3.81)	83.5 (3.29)	18.1 (0.71)	1.2 (0.05)	1.6 (0.06)	1.0 (0.04)	6.0 (0.24)	5.2 (0.20)	15.2 (0.60)	36.2 (1.43)	114.3 (4.50)	519.1 (20.44)
Average precipitation days	14	10	9	4	1	1	0	1	2	3	6	14	65
Source: Servicio Nacional de Meteorología e Hidrología de Bolivia
