= Bernard Gutiérrez =

Bolivian politician (born 1972)

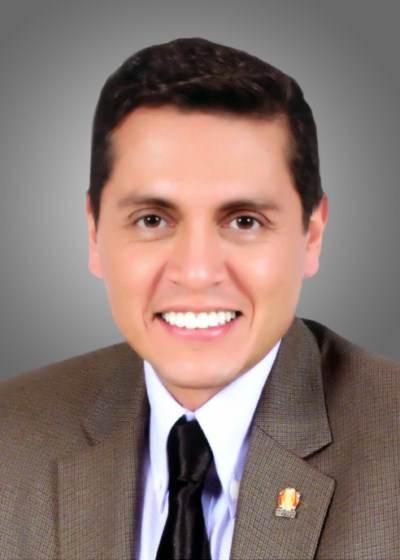
- Official portrait, 2015

Member of the Chamber of Deputies from Cochabamba
- In office 18 January 2015 – 14 January 2020
- Substitute: Isabel Bustamante
- Preceded by: Apolinar Rivera
- Succeeded by: Isabel Bustamante
- Constituency: Party list

Senator for Cochabamba
- In office 19 January 2010 – 10 July 2014
- Substitute: Lenny Zaconeta
- Preceded by: Seat established
- Succeeded by: Lenny Zaconeta

Personal details
- Born: Bernard Osvaldo Gutiérrez Sanz; 8 January 1972 (age 54) Cochabamba, Bolivia
- Party: Social Democratic Movement (2013–present)
- Education: Higher University of San Simón
- Occupation: Lawyer; politician; television presenter
- Website: Official website

Bernard Osvaldo Gutiérrez Sanz (born 8 January 1972) is a Bolivian lawyer, politician, and former television presenter who served as senator for Cochabamba from 2010 to 2014 and as a party-list member of the Chamber of Deputies from Cochabamba from 2015 to 2020.

Though born to a well-off family from Cochabamba, Gutiérrez chose to begin working from a young age, taking jobs at local and nearby business entities throughout his teens and early 20s. A graduate of the Higher University of San Simón, he practiced law and taught as a university professor before gaining fame as host of various programs on the PAT network in the early 2000s.

In 2008, Gutiérrez was brought on to the legal team of Cochabamba Prefect Manfred Reyes Villa, who invited him to run for Senate the following year. Though operating within a fractured caucus, Gutiérrez played an active role as a member of the political opposition. He attained reelection to the Chamber of Deputies in 2014 but grew estranged from the parliamentary process, ultimately vacating his seat.

== Early life and career ==
Bernard Gutiérrez was born on 8 January 1972 to an affluent family from Cochabamba. Despite his household's relative economic comfort—his father was a doctor for the National Health Fund and a docent at the Higher University of San Simón—Gutiérrez began working early in life. At age 12, he dropped out of school and began taking night courses in order to focus on commercial activities. By 19, he had been brought on as a manager at a company in Cochabamba, later working in sales for various local business entities. In 1993, he moved to Santa Cruz de la Sierra, where he was hired as a business manager for a company that handled the commercial operations of the Bolivian National Brewery.

In 1995, Gutiérrez returned to Cochabamba to pursue a formal academic education. He graduated as a lawyer from the Higher University of San Simón, receiving a bachelor's in legal and political science with a specialization in civil and constitutional law. He later undertook a series of postgraduate studies abroad in Spain and the United States, completing a master's in business administration from the European School of Business and taking public policy courses at the universities of Salamanca and Georgetown.

Gutiérrez worked as a private practice lawyer and taught academic courses on roman law and civil procedure throughout the early 2000s. In tandem, he began operating in media spaces, writing as an opinion columnist for various local and national press outlets. He gained national notoriety as host of the program Nuestro Derecho, which aired on the PAT network between 2004 and 2005. He followed that up in 2007 with the political analysis show Contrapeso, which he co-hosted alongside José María Leyes.

== Chamber of Senators ==
=== Election ===
As a natural evolution of his legal work, Gutiérrez quickly began participating in local Cochabamba politics. In 2006, he joined the Cochabamba Civic Committee as an advisor to the body's president, and in 2008, he was named general counsel to the prefecture. In that role, he assisted Cochabamba's then-prefect, Manfred Reyes Villa, who at the time was facing—and ultimately lost—a recall vote against him and sought to challenge the referendum's legality.

As a member of the prefect's legal team, Gutiérrez quickly converted himself into a close confidant of Reyes Villa. When the latter launched his 2009 presidential campaign, Gutiérrez was invited to join the National Convergence (CN) ticket as a candidate for Senate. He won the race, becoming CN's lone senator for the Cochabamba Department.

=== Tenure ===
Confined to the absolute minority and limited in their ability to pass legislation, many members of CN's caucus—including Gutiérrez —focused their work on parliamentary oversight, "monitoring and denouncing the [ruling party's] legislative management," as Gutiérrez put it. In that regard, Gutiérrez played an active role as a member of the political opposition, including serving as leader of CN's Senate caucus from 2011 to 2012. At just ten members, the alliance fared better in the upper chamber than in the lower, where frequent infighting and lack of coherent leadership caused it to crumble almost immediately. Even then, Gutiérrez's term in leadership consistently contended with a few renegade senators—namely Marcelo Antezana and Gerald Ortiz—who posed problems for CN throughout his and his successor's terms.

=== Commission assignments ===
- Chamber of Senators Directorate (Second Vice President: 2013–2014)
- Constitution, Human Rights, Legislation, and Electoral System Commission
  - Electoral System, Human Rights, and Social Equity Committee (Secretary: 2010–2013)
- International Policy Commission
  - International Economic Relations Committee (Secretary: 2014)

== Chamber of Deputies ==
=== Election ===
For many legislators who entered parliament at the invitation of Reyes Villa, prospects for reelection in his absence were slim. The exceptions—as in the case of Gutiérrez—centered on those that adapted to the ever-changing opposition political landscape. In 2013, Gutiérrez became a founding member of the Social Democratic Movement (MDS), a group led—in Cochabamba—by his old television partner, José María Leyes. The party nominated Gutiérrez for reelection, and in mid-2014, he resigned his Senate seat to contest a space in the Chamber of Deputies.

The switch from the upper to lower chamber could be construed as a regression in political influence on the part of Gutiérrez. However—in an instance of uncertainty regarding its electoral prospects in the department—it could also be interpreted as an attempt by the MDS to guarantee Gutiérrez's presence in parliament where a candidacy for a more prominent position would have otherwise failed. The strategy worked, with Gutiérrez joining the small group of former CN legislators that returned to parliament waving the MDS flag.

=== Tenure ===
Throughout his term, Gutiérrez developed a reputation for truancy, accumulating frequent absences from legislative sessions. Between 2015 and 2016, he filed a total of forty-six leave of absence petitions, many citing invitations by the Cochabamba municipal government, where his friend Leyes had been elected mayor. Gutiérrez had been part of Leyes's transition team and even considered resigning his parliamentary seat to instead join the mayor's cabinet. Although that never came to pass, he continued to make frequent trips to the city, often citing his oversight role as justification.

In May 2017, an investigation into Gutiérrez's lack of attendance was opened at the Ethics Commission. The complaint accused him of benefitting from multiple approved leave requests based on false pretenses and having amassed over two weeks' worth of unapproved absences, begetting expulsion from office. Shortly after the case was admitted, Gutiérrez requested and was granted approval for an extended period of leave, preventing the Ethics Commission from delivering his summons and causing the process to stall. By September 2018, Gutiérrez had been on unpaid leave for seven months and had extended it for a few more, leading officials to theorize that he intended to draw out the process until the end of the legislative term to avoid being sanctioned.

For his part, Gutiérrez attributed his extended absence to personal, family, and health motives: "For eight years, I was constantly traveling; I didn't realize it, but this affected my nervous system." Although Gutiérrez signaled his intent to return on 21 January 2019, he ultimately never did so. His substitute, Isabel Bustamante, was given his committee assignment on 24 January, and she was formally sworn in as his permanent replacement the following year. Distanced from political life, Gutiérrez returned to private practice lawyering and is currently a partner at Prediction Point, a political consultancy firm, in addition to having taken up painting as a side hobby.

=== Commission assignments ===
- Planning, Economic Policy, and Finance Commission
  - Planning and Public Investment Committee (2015–2016)
- Plural Economy, Production, and Industry Commission
  - Industry, Commerce, Transport, and Tourism Committee (2016–2019)

== Electoral history ==
Electoral history of Bernard Gutiérrez
| Year | Office | Party | Alliance | Votes | | | Result | Ref. |
| Year | Office | Party | Alliance | Total | % | P. | Result | Ref. |
|---|---|---|---|---|---|---|---|---|
| 2009 | Senator | Independent | National Convergence | 203,041 | 24.55% | 2nd | Won | (Note: Presented on an electoral list. The data shown represents the share of the vote the entire party/alliance received in that constituency.) |
| 2014 | Deputy | Social Democratic Movement | Democratic Unity | 186,346 | 19.50% | 2nd | Won | |
Source: Plurinational Electoral Organ | Electoral Atlas

Senate of Bolivia
| Seat established | Senator for Cochabamba; 2010–2014; Served alongside: Adolfo Mendoza, Marcelina Chávez, Julio Salazar | Succeeded by Lenny Zaconeta |
| Preceded by Centa Rek | Second Vice President of the Senate; 2013–2014 | Succeeded by Jimena Torres |
Party political offices
| Preceded by Germán Antelo | Leader of the Senate; National Convergence Caucus; 2011–2012 | Succeeded by Roger Pinto |
Chamber of Deputies of Bolivia
| Preceded by Apolinar Rivera | Member of the Chamber of Deputies from Cochabamba; 2015–2020 | Succeeded by Isabel Bustamante |
