= Capinota =

- Location in Bolivia
- Coordinates: 17°42′54″S 66°15′49″W
- Country: Bolivia
- Department: Cochabamba Department
- Province: Capinota Province

Population (2012)
  - Total: 29,659
- Time zone: UTC-4 (BOT)

Capinota is a small town in the Bolivian Department of Cochabamba and capital of the Capinota Province.

== Location ==
Capinota is situated at an altitude of 2,380 m where the rivers Río Arque and Río Rocha meet to become the Río Caine and the Río Grande downstream. It is located 66 kilometers south of the department capital Cochabamba on the northern river bank of Río Arque, at 17°42′54″S 66°15′49″W.

== Climate ==
The climate is semi-arid with a yearly rainfall average of 500 mm and a temperature average of 18 °C. The dry season lasts from May to September and the town experiences lower temperatures but no frost. The rainy season lasts from December to February and is warmer.

Climate data for Capinota, elevation 2,406 m (7,894 ft)
Month	Jan	Feb	Mar	Apr	May	Jun	Jul	Aug	Sep	Oct	Nov	Dec	Year
Record high °C (°F)	39.0 (102.2)	36.0 (96.8)	35.5 (95.9)	33.8 (92.8)	32.0 (89.6)	30.5 (86.9)	30.8 (87.4)	34.0 (93.2)	36.0 (96.8)	38.0 (100.4)	39.2 (102.6)	41.0 (105.8)	41.0 (105.8)
Mean daily maximum °C (°F)	28.3 (82.9)	27.8 (82.0)	27.9 (82.2)	27.8 (82.0)	26.2 (79.2)	24.4 (75.9)	24.9 (76.8)	27.1 (80.8)	29.2 (84.6)	30.6 (87.1)	30.7 (87.3)	29.3 (84.7)	27.9 (82.1)
Daily mean °C (°F)	20.4 (68.7)	20.0 (68.0)	19.8 (67.6)	18.9 (66.0)	15.7 (60.3)	13.3 (55.9)	13.4 (56.1)	15.8 (60.4)	18.7 (65.7)	20.8 (69.4)	21.6 (70.9)	21.0 (69.8)	18.3 (64.9)
Mean daily minimum °C (°F)	12.4 (54.3)	12.3 (54.1)	11.7 (53.1)	10.0 (50.0)	5.2 (41.4)	2.2 (36.0)	1.9 (35.4)	4.4 (39.9)	8.3 (46.9)	11.0 (51.8)	12.5 (54.5)	12.8 (55.0)	8.7 (47.7)
Record low °C (°F)	5.0 (41.0)	5.2 (41.4)	3.0 (37.4)	1.8 (35.2)	−3.2 (26.2)	−5.3 (22.5)	−7.0 (19.4)	−3.0 (26.6)	−1.3 (29.7)	1.5 (34.7)	4.0 (39.2)	3.0 (37.4)	−7.0 (19.4)
Average precipitation mm (inches)	124.0 (4.88)	98.2 (3.87)	76.6 (3.02)	21.6 (0.85)	3.4 (0.13)	2.8 (0.11)	1.4 (0.06)	6.5 (0.26)	11.6 (0.46)	24.4 (0.96)	57.7 (2.27)	103.0 (4.06)	531.2 (20.93)
Average precipitation days	13.6	11.5	9.4	3.4	0.8	0.5	0.5	1.5	2.9	4.8	7.3	11.4	67.6
Source: Servicio Nacional de Meteorología e Hidrología de Bolivia

== Population ==
The population is mainly of Quechua and mestizo of origin. The Capinota province has three sections: Capinota, Santivanes, and Sicaya and according to the 2012 census, the 29.659 population was distributed among Capinota, Santivanes, and Sicaya as 19.392, 6.527 and 3.740 inhabitants, respectively. The Capinota city is the biggest urban town and its population has risen from 3,955 (census 1992) to 4,801 (census 2001) and to 5.264 (census 2012). The second urban city is Irpa Irpa, having 3.868 inhabitants (census 2012).

== Industry and Trade ==
Four kilometers from the city, in the community Irpa-Irpa is where Coboce Mill a cement production industry is located. This is the only major industrial activity in Capinota. Recently, Coboce concluded its expansion with a brand new mill. The Coboce company brought economic importance in trade and transportation to the province. The transportation of Coboce products is dominated by the local citizens.

== Agriculture ==
Because of the absence of frost, conditions for agriculture are favourable all year round. Crops which are mainly cultivated are potatoes, carrots, beets, onions, corn and alfalfa. There are also horticultural activities, such as vineyards and fruit trees, like peaches and apples.

The average field size is only 0.35 ha, ranging from 600 to 6000 m^{2}. Land is owned privately as well as rented on a sharecropping basis. The land is prepared and ploughed manually and with oxen, tractors are rarely used.

== Lameo ==
Farmers in Capinota, as in some other valleys of the Cochabamba Department, practise the technique of lameo (or: may'kas), an indigenous method of soil conservation, to enrich and conserve their soils. They make use of the minerals and organic sediments of Río Arque which are freed by rains in the upper part of the river basin. These materials are trapped by altering the course of the river in the Capinota basin to flood some of the fields along the river bed.

To alter the course of the river, bocatomas are made, man-made openings or inlets, which have to be rebuilt after each flooding by the river, which is done every 1–3 years. These bocatomas are 30 cm high and capture an average layer of sediment of 10 cm in every field. Building these 'dykes' around the fields is mainly done in December at the beginning of the rainy season. Between the outer dykes and inside the fields, small canals 35 cm deep and 80 cm wide are built to distribute the water equally. At the lower end of the field furrows drain the excess water, so that the land inside the outer dykes is covered by 12 to 15 cm of water.

Lameo irrigation and sedimentation at Capinota cover 228 ha and more than 200 farmers participate in it. It enables the farmers to practise an intensive and market oriented agriculture where mainly potatoes and Dutch tomatoes are grown. In fields located further away from the river, the soil is enriched by mixing the river sediments with the existing soil, adding chicken manure.

From studies of geomorphology and sedimentation in the Valle Alto region it can be estimated that the technique of lameo goes back as far as 1500 BCE.

== Sources ==
- Lameo, an indigenous method of soil conservation
- Estimating spatial patterns of soil erosion and deposition in the Andean region
- Appropriate designs and appropriating irrigation systems
