= Capinota Province =

Province in the Cochabamba Department, Bolivia

Coordinates: 17°45′S 66°40′W

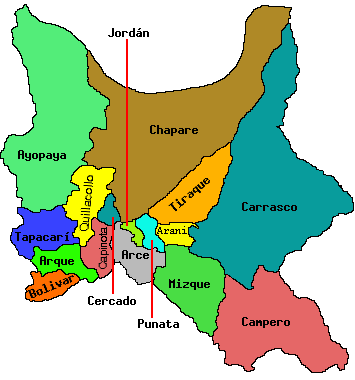
Location in the Cochabamba Department

Capinota is one of sixteen provinces in the Cochabamba Department, Bolivia. Its capital is the city of Capinota. The province has a projected population over 33,000 inhabitants by 2017. Capinota has three sections and the most populous is Capinota section, followed by Santivanes.

== Subdivision ==
Capinota Province is divided into three municipalities which are further subdivided into cantons.

Section	Municipality	Seat
1st	Capinota Municipality	Capinota
2nd	Santiváñez Municipality	Santiváñez
3rd	Sicaya Municipality	Sicaya

== See also ==
- Kuntur Wachana
- Puka Mayu
- Waña Quta
