= Leonardo Loza =

Bolivian politician (born 1983)

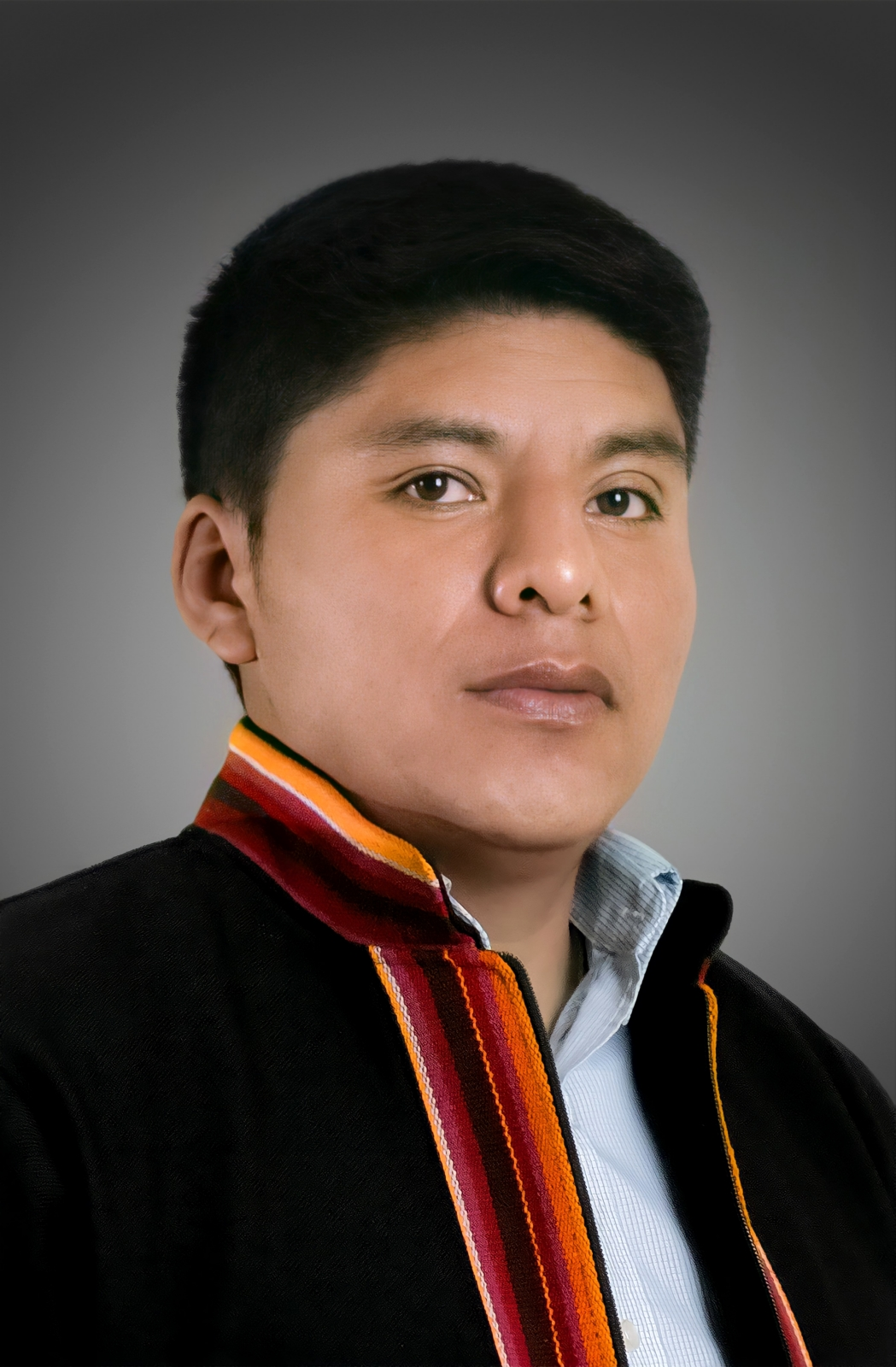
- Loza in 2020

Governor of Cochabamba
- Incumbent
- Assumed office 4 May 2026
- Preceded by: Humberto Sánchez

Member of the Chamber of Senators
- In office 3 November 2020 – 6 November 2025
- Constituency: Cochabamba

Personal details
- Born: 13 November 1983 (age 42)
- Party: EVO Pueblo

Leonardo Loza (born 13 November 1983) is a Bolivian politician serving as governor of Cochabamba since 2026. From 2020 to 2025, he was a member of the Chamber of Senators.
