= Civic Community =

Bolivian political coalition

Civic Community Comunidad Ciudadana
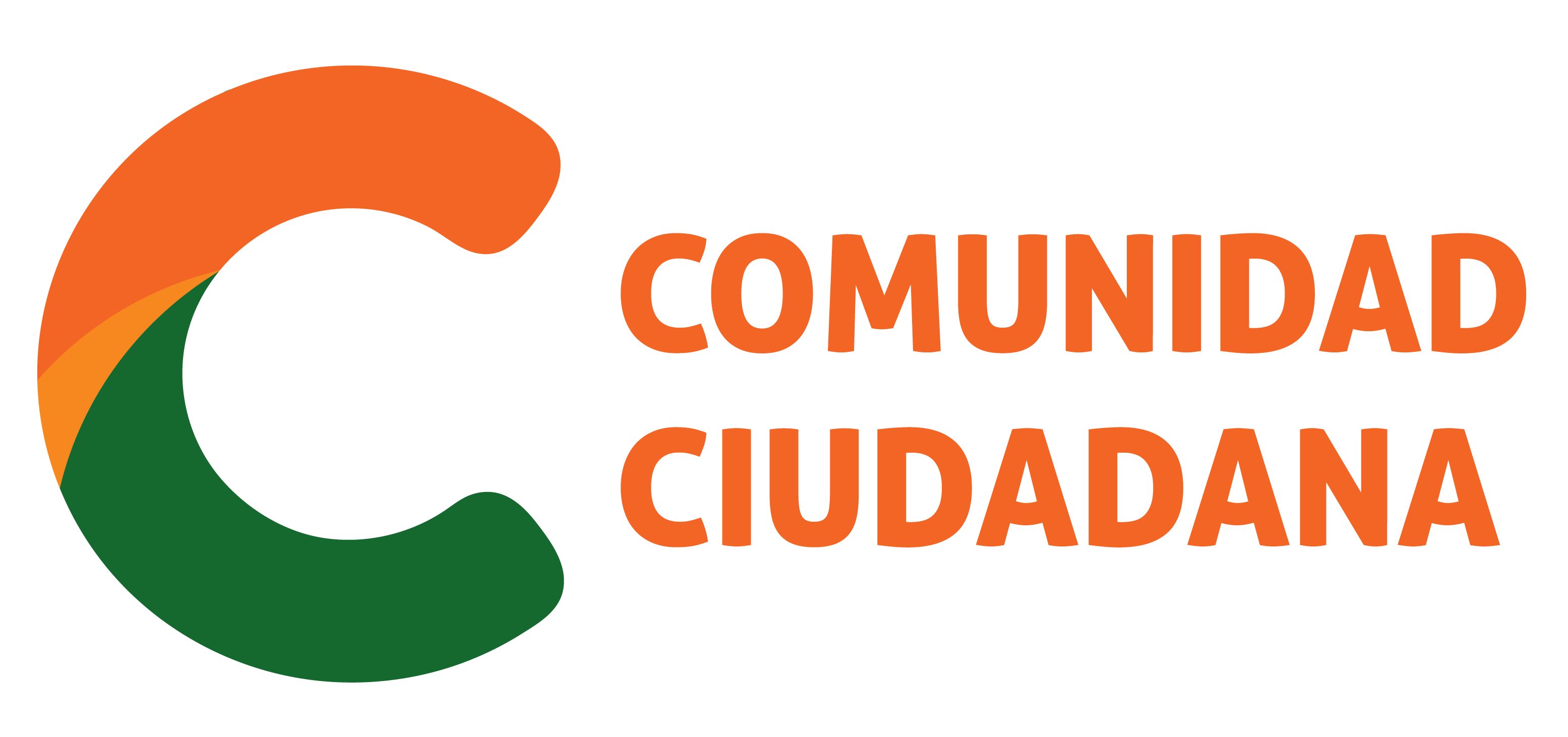
- Abbreviation: CC
- Leader: Carlos Mesa
- Senate spokesperson: Andrea Barrientos
- Chamber spokesperson: Carlos Alarcón
- Founded: 13 November 2018; 7 years ago
- Membership (2019): 88,122
- Ideology: Liberalism; Third Way; Constitutionalism
- Political position: Centre to centre-right
- Colours: Dark Orange; Orange; Green
- Members: List: Revolutionary Left Front (2018–2024); First the People (2020–present)
- Senate: 0 / 36
- Chamber of Deputies: 0 / 130
- Governorships: 0 / 9
- Mayors: 6 / 337

Party flag

Website
- https://comunidadciudadanabo.com/

Civic Community (Spanish: Comunidad Ciudadana, CC) is a liberal Bolivian political coalition led by former president Carlos Mesa, founded in 2018 to contest the 2019 general election. It was born of the alliance of Revolutionary Left Front (FRI), Sovereignty and Freedom (Sol.Bo), All Organization, and Kochala Force parties. The alliance holds Mesa's presidential candidacy, with former minister Gustavo Pedraza as his running mate. The CC elected 50 deputies and 14 senators in the country's Plurinational Legislative Assembly in the election.

The CC campaign focused on condemning the candidacy of incumbent president Evo Morales to an unconstitutional fourth consecutive five-year term. The election took place on October 20, 2019. With a preliminary vote count of 45% for incumbent president Evo Morales and 38% for his leading challenger, former president Carlos Mesa, after 83% of votes were counted, neither of those conditions appeared likely to be met. A second-round runoff vote between those two candidates would therefore be held on 15 December.

After that figure of 83% of the total, however, no further updates to the preliminary results were made after 19:40 hours local time, which caused consternation among opposition politicians and the election monitors deployed by the Organization of American States; candidate Mesa described the suspension as "extremely serious" and spoke of manipulation, while the OAS said an explanation was essential. The electoral authorities explained that updates to the preliminary count had been halted because the official results were beginning to be released; nevertheless, no official results were published overnight.

== Constituent parties ==
=== 2019 ===
On 6 October 2018, former president Carlos Mesa accepted the invitation of the Revolutionary Left Front (FRI) to be the party's presidential candidate in the 2019 general elections. Soon after, various parties expressed their interest in forming a unified opposition alliance with Mesa at the helm. On 24 October, La Paz Mayor Luis Revilla announced that his Sovereignty and Liberty (SOL.bo) civic group had decided to support Mesa's candidacy. After a 26-minute walk through the Central Urban Park La Paz on 30 October, Revilla and Mesa, before the media, presented their "Citizen" alliance. The pact was formalized the following day. Civic Community (CC) was registered with the Supreme Electoral Tribunal on 13 November 2018 as a coalition between the FRI, SOL.bo, and over 50 citizens platforms. The coalition was further expanded the following day, when CC signed an alliance with TODOS, the regional party of Tarija Governor Adrián Oliva.

Despite last minute hopes of constructing a "greater agreement" between CC and the two largest opposition fronts, the National Unity Front (UN) and the Democrat Social Movement (MDS), both parties registered their own alliance dubbed "Bolivia Says No".

Party	Ideology	Type	Registration
Revolutionary Left Front	Reformism, Social democracy	Political party	National
Sovereignty and Liberty	Social democracy	Civic group	La Paz

=== 2020–2021 ===
CC contested regional elections for the first time in 2021. In all but three departments, CC ran its own candidates under the variant name Civic Community – Autonomies for Bolivia (Comunidad Ciudadana-Autonomías para Bolivia, CA). The exceptions were in Beni where it aligned with Creemos to form the Let's Change (Cambiemos) alliance, Pando where it joined with the regional Democratic Integration Community (CID), and Tarija where it gained the support of incumbent governor Adrián Oliva to form Community of Everyone (Comunidad de Todos). Santa Cruz was the only department where it did not present a gubernatorial candidate, choosing instead to endorse Creemos leader Luis Fernando Camacho.

Largely as a result of the hugely divided opposition field, CC failed to win any gubernatorial elections and won six mayoral elections. These were in Camiri, Colcapirhua, Ingavi, Puerto Rico, San Pedro de Manuripi, and Santos Mercado. The latter four were all located in Pando, where CC saw its best performance.

In the 2021 elections the Civic Community coalition was composed of the following groups:

Party		Ideology	Type	Registration
Revolutionary Left Front	Reformism; Social democracy	Political party	National	
First the People	Reformism; Social democracy	Civic group	Tarija	

=== 2024 ===
In December 2024 the Revolutionary Left Front left the coalition in order to support the candidacy of Jorge Quiroga in the 2025 presidential election. Marcelo Pedrazas, a CC deputy from Chuquisaca, stated that the FRI's withdrawal indicated that "Civic Community has become a failed project" as a result of internal strife within the coalition.

== Electoral results ==
=== Presidential elections ===
Election	Presidential nominee	Running mate	Votes	%	Votes	%	Result
Election	Presidential nominee	Running mate	First Round		Second Round		Result
2019	Carlos Mesa	Gustavo Pedraza	2,240,920	36.51%			Annulled ✗
2020	Carlos Mesa	Gustavo Pedraza	1,775,943	28.83%			Lost ✗
2025	Did not contest						

=== Legislative elections ===
Plurinational Legislative Assembly
Election	Votes		Seats				Position	Government
Election	No.	%	Chamber	±	Senate	±	Position	Government
2019	2,240,920	36.51	50 / 130	▲50	14 / 38	▲14	2nd	Results annulled
2020	1,775,943	28.83	39 / 130	▼11	11 / 38	▼3	2nd	Movement for Socialism
2025	Did not contest		0 / 130	▼39	0 / 36	▼11	N/A	Extra-parliamentary

=== Regional elections ===
Election	Seats			
Election	Mayors	±	Governors	±
2021	6 / 337	▲6	0 / 9	0

== See also ==
- List of political parties in Bolivia
