= Cochabamba Department =

Department of Bolivia

Coordinates: 17°20′S 65°30′W

Cochabamba Departamento de Cochabamba (Spanish) Quchapampa Suyu (Quechua)
- Department
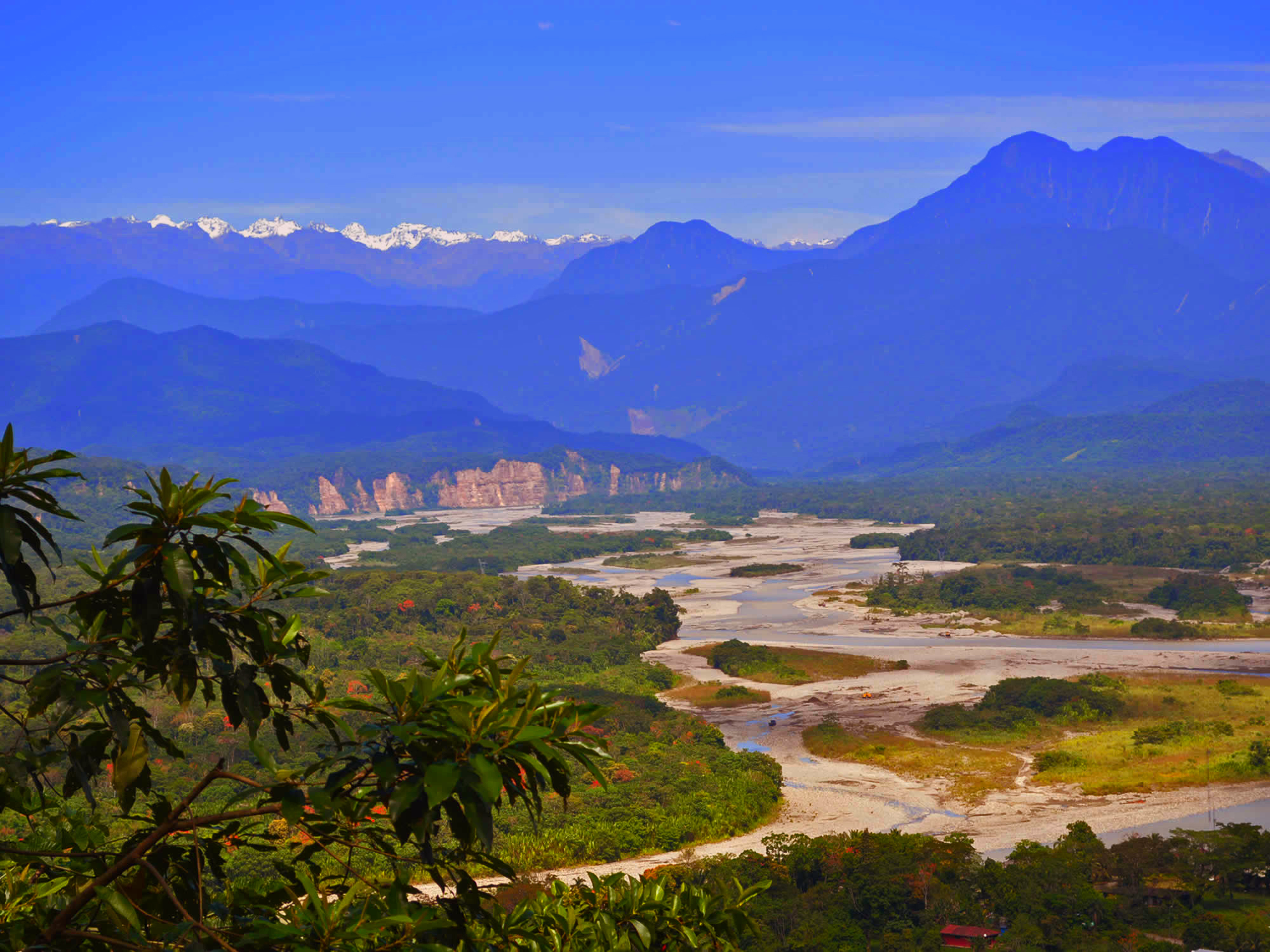
- Incallajta, Carrasco Province

- Flag Coat of arms

- Location within Bolivia
- Country: Bolivia
- Established as department by law: 1826
- Autonomous department by referendum: 2009
- Capital: Cochabamba

Government
  - Body: Departmental Legislative Assembly of Cochabamba
  - Governor: Leonardo Loza (EVO Pueblo)

Area
  - Total: 55,631 km^{2} (21,479 sq mi)
- Elevation: 2,574 m (8,445 ft)

Population (2024)
  - Total: 2,005,373
  - Rank: 3rd
- Time zone: UTC-4 (BOT)
- HDI (2019): 0.708 high · 7th of 9
- ISO 3166-2: BO-C
- GDP (2023): in constant currency of 2015
- Total: US$ 6.6 billion Int$ 15.4 billion (PPP)
- Per capita: US$ 3,000; Int$ 7,100 (PPP)
- Website: Official website

Cochabamba (Aymara: Quchapampa Jach'a Suyu, Spanish: Departamento de Cochabamba pronounced [kotʃaˈβamba], Quechua: Quchapampa Suyu), from Quechua qucha or qhucha, meaning "lake", pampa meaning "plain", is one of the nine departments of Bolivia. It is known to be the breadbasket of the country because of its variety of agricultural products from its geographical position. It has an area of 55,631 km^{2}. Its population in the 2024 census was 2,005,373. Its capital is the city of Cochabamba, known as the "City of Eternal Spring" and "The Garden City" because of its spring-like temperatures all year.

== History ==
The Cochabamba valley has been inhabited for over a thousand years due to its fertile productive soils and climate. Archaeological evidence suggests that the initial valley inhabitants were of various ethnic indigenous groups. Tiwanaku, Tupuraya, Mojocoya, Omereque and Inca inhabited the valley at various times before the Spanish arrived.

The first Spanish inhabitant of the Valley was Garci Ruiz de Orellana in 1542. He purchased the majority of the land from local tribal chiefs Achata and Consavana through a title registered in 1552 at the Imperial City of Potosí. The price paid was 130 pesos. His residence, known as the House of Mayorazgo, still stands in the Cala Cala neighbourhood of the city.

The city, called Villa de Oropesa was founded on 2 August 1571 by order of Viceroy Francisco de Toledo, Count of Oropesa. It was to be an agricultural production centre to provide food for the mining towns of the relatively nearby Altiplano region, particularly the city of Potosí which became one of the largest and richest cities in the world during the 17th century – funding the vast wealth that ultimately made Spain a world power at the time. With the silver mining industry in Potosi at its height, Cochabamba thrived during its first centuries of existence. The city entered a period of decline during the 18th century as mining began to wane.

In 1786, King Charles III of Spain renamed the city to the 'loyal and valiant' Villa of Cochabamba. This was done to commend the city's pivotal role in suppressing the indigenous rebellions of 1781 in Oruro by sending armed forces to Oruro to quell the uprisings. Since the late 19th century it has again been generally successful as an agricultural centre for Bolivia.

The 1793 census shows that the city had a population of 22,305 persons. There were 12,980 mestizos, 6,368 Spaniards, 1,182 indigenous natives, 1,600 mulattos and 175 African slaves.

In 2000, Cochabamba was wracked by large-scale protests over the privatisation of the city's water supply, known as the Water War.

In January 2007 city dwellers clashed with mostly rural protestors, leaving four dead and over 130 injured. The democratically elected Prefect of Cochabamba, Manfred Reyes Villa, a former military aide to the Luis García Meza dictatorship of the 1980s, had allied himself with the leaders of Bolivia's eastern departments in a dispute with President Evo Morales over regional autonomy and other political issues. The protestors blockaded the highways, bridges, and main roads, having days earlier set fire to the departmental seat of government, trying to force the resignation of Reyes Villa. Citizens attacked the protestors, breaking the blockade and routing them, while the police did little to stop the violence. Further attempts by the protestors to reinstate the blockade and threaten the government were unsuccessful, but the underlying tensions have not been resolved.

In July 2007, a monument erected by veterans of January's protest movement in honour of those killed and injured by government supporters was destroyed in the middle of the night, reigniting racial conflicts in the city.

In August 2008, a nationwide referendum was held, and while President Evo Morales had 67% support in Bolivia, the Prefect of Cochabamba, Manfred Reyes Villa, was not confirmed by the voters of the department.

In 2018 Cochabamba hosted the 2018 South American Games ODESUR.

Around 74% of Cochabambinos identify as indigenous, while most of the remaining population is mestizo.

== Geography ==
Cochabamba Department is bordered by Chuquisaca and Potosi Departments to the south, Oruro and La Paz Departments to the west, Beni Department to the north, and Santa Cruz Department to the east. The borders are formed mainly by rivers, like Ichilo to the east, Rio Grande to the south and Cotacajes to the west.

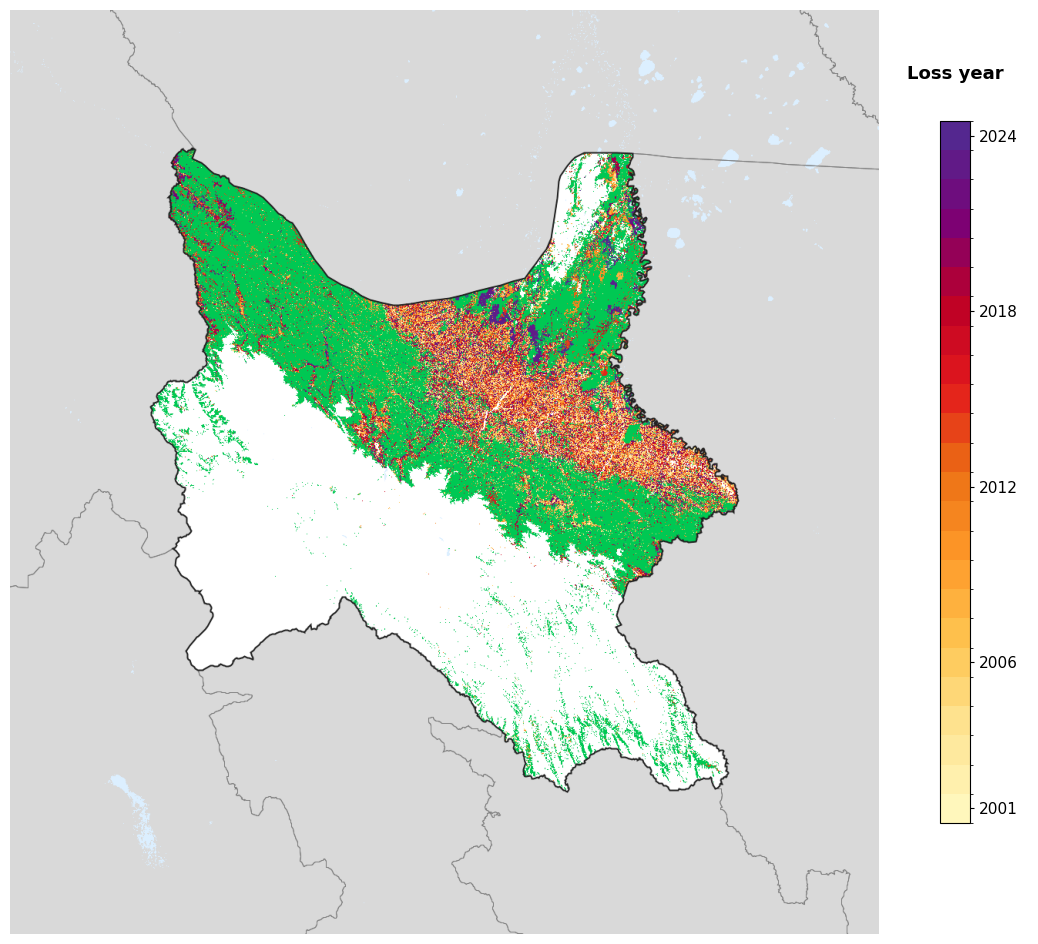
Tree-cover loss year in Cochabamba, 2001-2024, from the Global Forest Change dataset.

Geographically and climatically, Cochabamba is one of Bolivia's most diverse regions, with a similar orography and diversity to La Paz department. Cochabamba is made up of a variety of regions. The northern portions of the department, known as the Chapare, is a region of moist Southwestern Amazonian moist forests with high levels of precipitation between 2,000mm and 7,000mm a year. This region is marked by steep hills and mountains at the edge of the Central Andes descending into the flat floodplains of the Llanos de Moxos to the north of Cochabamba. Further east of this region is a transition zone between the Tropical Wet-and-Dry forests of Santa Cruz and the Chapare, where Monsoonal climates predominate with an average annual precipitation between 1,800mm and 3,000mm.

South of the Tropical lowlands of Cochabamba lies a thin band of montane cloud forests that run slightly southeast from north to south in Cochabamba. This region features an unusual subtropical highland climate and Oceanic climate, with precipitation year-round, with some drying periods. Precipitation in this region ranges between 1,000mm and 2,500mm.

The center of the department is marked by the temperate xeric valleys of Cochabamba (known as Kanata), Alto Cochabamba, and Capinota. These valley areas are marked by dry montane forests, and semi-arid orographies. Temperate climates year-round feature considerable diurnal temperature variation due to the high altitude. A majority of the department's population lives in this area, where major cities are located like Cochabamba, Cliza, Punata, Sacaba, Quillacollo, Arani, Santivańez, Capinota, Irpa Irpa, among others.

Surrounding the smaller valleys of the department's center from the west to the east, is a region of Andean highlands, featuring a subtropical highland climate, with annual precipitation averaging between 400mm and 1,400mm. This region of rocky valleys and moderately sized mountains features mosaics of high altitude forests and agricultural heartland. This region features dramatic and diverse geographies, with a considerable historical and archaeological importance.

To the southeast of the highlands of Cochabamba, are semi-arid valleys and mountains terminating at the banks of the Wapaymayu or Río Grande. This area, famous for its cultural history, is marked by dry valleys and mountains, with agricultural lands bordering rivers throughout the region. Precipitation in this region is generally sparse, oscillating between 300mm and 600mm per year, bordering on a Desert climate

To the extreme southwest, is a small tract of Puna which features a cold Tundra climate, with unusual subpolar oceanic characteristics. Precipitation in this area ranges between 300mm and 650mm per year.

== Government ==
=== Executive offices ===
Since May 2010, the chief executive officer of Bolivia departments has been the governor; before then, the officer was called the prefect, and until 2006, the prefect was appointed by the president of Bolivia. The current governor, Humberto Sánchez of the Movement for Socialism – Political Instrument for the Sovereignty of the Peoples (MAS–IPSP) was elected on 7 March 2021 and took office on 4 May.

The MAS–IPSP has been the dominant political party in the department since the 2008 recall referendum.

Took office	Office expired	Prefect/Governor	Party	Notes
10 Jun 1999	8 Apr 2000	Hugo Galindo Saucedo		Appointed prefect by President Hugo Banzer through Supreme Decree 25411. Resigned during the 2000 Cochabamba water protests after his advice to concede protester demands was ignored.
8 Apr 2000	10 Apr 2000	Eduardo Wayar Cortéz		Police commander. Appointed interim prefect via Supreme Decree 25734 on the same day a state of siege was declared by President Hugo Banzer.
10 Apr 2000		Walter Céspedes Ramallo		Appointed prefect via Supreme Decree 25735.
23 Jan 2006	12 Aug 2008	Manfred Reyes Villa	New Republican Force	First elected prefect. Elected in Bolivian general election, December 2005, and removed by the 2008 recall election.
12 Aug 2008	26 Aug 2008	Johnny Gutierrez Ferrel (acting, de facto)		
29 Aug 2008	12 Dec 2008	Rafael Puente Calvo (acting)	MAS-IPSP	
12 Dec 2008	30 May 2010	Jorge Ledezma Cornejo (interim)	MAS-IPSP	Final prefect
30 May 2010	31 May 2015	Edmundo Novillo Aguilar	MAS-IPSP	Elected in regional election on 4 April 2010; first governor
31 May 2015	11 Nov 2019	Iván Canelas	MAS-IPSP	Elected in regional election on 29 March 2015.
14 Nov 2019	3 May 2021	Esther Soria Gonzáles	MAS-IPSP	Elected by the Legislative Assembly of Cochabamba following the resignation of Canelas.
3 May 2021	3 May 2026	Humberto Sánchez Sánchez	MAS-IPSP	Elected in the first round of the regional election on 7 March 2021.
3 May 2026	Incumbent	Leonardo Loza	EVO Pueblo	Elected in the first round of the regional election on 22 March 2026.
Source: worldstatesmen.org

=== Legislative Assembly ===
Under the 2009 Constitution, Bolivian departments have an elected legislature, the Departmental Legislative Assembly. The Cochabamba Assembly has 34 members including two indigenous representatives. The first elections were held 4 April 2010 and the current composition was determined at the regional election on 7 March 2021.

The current executive committee, elected on 3 May 2022, consists of Elena Aine Espinoza as president, Francisco Otalora Ticona as first vice-president, Pedro Andrés Badran Leon as second vice-president and Julieta Veizaga Guevara as first secretary.

== Subdivisions ==
=== Provinces ===
Cochabamba Department is divided into 16 provinces (provincias), which are further subdivided into 47 municipalities (municipios) and – on the fourth level – into 144 cantons.

The provinces with their capitals and population according to census 2012 are listed as follow:

Province	Capital	Area (km^{2})	Population (2012 census)
Arani	Arani	506	18,444
Arque	Arque	1.077	20,630
Ayopaya	Ayopaya	9.620	54,408
Bolívar	Bolívar	413	7,279
Capinota	Capinota	1.495	29,659
Carrasco	Totora	15.045	135,097
Cercado	Cochabamba	391	630,587
Chapare	Sacaba	12.445	262,845
Esteban Arce	Tarata	1.245	37,152
Germán Jordán	Cliza	305	34,342
Mizque	Mizque	2.730	35,586
Narciso Campero	Aiquile	5.550	35,763
Punata	Punata	850	54,409
Quillacollo	Quillacollo	720	335,393
Tapacarí	Tapacarí	1.500	24,595
Tiraque	Tiraque	1.739	41.954

=== Regions ===
The municipalities in Cochabamba Department can also be grouped informally into large regions. Provinces are not subsumed under regions, which have rather different borders. The five regions are:

- Región Andina (lit. 'Andean Region' or 'Region of the Andes'): the cordilleras in the west, part of the Altiplano.
- Cono Sur (lit. 'Southern Cone'), a cone-shaped (vaguely triangular) corner in the southeast.
- Región Metropolitana: the department's most populous region, centered around the capital city, Cochabamba
- Trópico (el Trópico de Cochabamba): the department's largest region, including Chimoré, Colomi, Entre Rios, Puerto Villarroel, Shinahota, Villa Tunari, and part of the llanos tropicales
- Valles (lit. 'Valleys'): south of Metropolitana.

== Languages ==
The languages spoken in Cochabamba Department are mainly Spanish and Quechua. The following table shows the number of those belonging to the recognised group of speakers.

Language	Department	Bolivia
Quechua	872,010	2,281,198
Aymara	84,921	1,525,321
Guaraní	1,379	62,575
Another native	3,351	49,432
Only native	269,588	960,491
Native and Spanish	648,195	2,739,407
Spanish	1,101,822	6,821,626
Foreign	40,579	250,754
Spanish and foreign	454,273	4,115,751

== Population and demographics ==
Description	Department 1976	Department 1992	Department 2001	Department 2012	Department 2024
Inhabitants	720,952	1,110,205	1,455,711	1,758,143	2,005,373
Rural	-	-	41 %	-	-
Urban	-	-	59 %	-	-
Total fertility rate	-		4.00		
Infant mortality	-		72.00		
Annualized decade growth rate	-	3.46	2.93	1.68	1.1
Net migration rate	-	-	2.40	-	-

== Religion ==
Cochabamba is home to a diverse amount of religious adherents, with 42% identifying as Catholics, 32% as Evangelical Christians, 0.67% as Muslims, and the remaining 27% as identifying with either no religion or other religions.

== Economy ==
The Cochabamba economy is based mainly in services, but recently it is experiencing some diversification in manufacturing, agriculture and tourism. The geographic location of Cochabamba makes it the main routes of transport joining the two main cities, the host government La Paz and the industrial hub Santa Cruz. Therefore, many cervices i.e. transport, banking, telecommunication, gastronomy, are economically important in the corridor La Paz – Santa Cruz. Extraction of oil was very important for the economy in the past; especially in Chapare where the wells are located. By 2013 many of the exploited wells were showing signs of depletion. Thus, investment is needed to find new productive wells. Once called “the basket grain of Bolivia” today Cochabamba produces just a portion of the agriculture output of the country. Overpopulation in the productive valleys and “minifundio” doomed the once competitive production. Nevertheless, Cochabamba is still important in poultry, dairy, tropical fruits, potatoes, among others. Recently, Cochabamba experiences some improvement in manufacturing and industry. The cement mill of COBOCE located in Capinota almost triples the production tapering the strong demand. The roads to the industrial park and other facilities of the park were improved making it more competitive for the local and new industries. Also, it is worth to mention the almost 1b USD government investment in the petro chemistry (urea plant) located in Bulo Bulo.

== Places of interest ==
- Carrasco National Park
- Tunari National Park
- Isiboro Sécure National Park and Indigenous Territory
- Inkallaqta
- Inkachaka
- Inka Raqay
- Quillacollo
- Villa Tunari
- Laguna La Angostura
- Payrumani: The Payrumani estate about 20 km from the city of Cochabamba comprises Villa Albina, a landed estate which was property of the Bolivian industrialist Simón I. Patiño, built between 1925 and 1932, a model farm and seed centre and a Centre for Phytoecogenetic Research.

== Towns and villages ==
- Apillapampa

== See also ==
- Ismael Montes Teacher Training College
