= 2013 Bolivian special municipal elections =

Local Election in Bolivia

The 2013 Bolivian special municipal elections were held on 13 January 2013 in the municipalities of Punata (in Cochabamba Department) and Bermejo (in Tarija Department. Newly elected mayors will receive their credentials from the Supreme Electoral Tribunal, after which they may be sworn in.

City	Outgoing Mayor (Party)	Notes	Candidates	Mayor Elect
Bermejo, Tarija	Délfor Burgos Aguirre (Movimiento Alternativo Regional; MAR)	Suspended under indictment in August 2010; resigned 22 June 2011.	Afrodisio Tarqui, Acción Social Independiente (ASI); Reynaldo García, Movement Towards Socialism (MAS); José Gutiérrez, Poder Autonómico Nacional (MAR/PAN); Wilson Caiguara, Alliance for Bermejo (MNR-UN)	José Gutiérrez Baldivieso
Punata, Cochabamba	Víctor Balderrama (Insurgente Martín Uchu)	Suspended under indictment for aggravated rape of a minor on August 10, 2010 (convicted September 2011); pledged to resign to allow new elections	Silvia Jaldín, Insurgente Martín Uchu (IMU); José Antonio Gonzales, Movement Towards Socialism (MAS); Henry Rojas, Without Fear Movement (MSM); Guido Mérida, National Unity (UN).	José Antonio Gonzales
