= Arani Municipality =

- Municipality
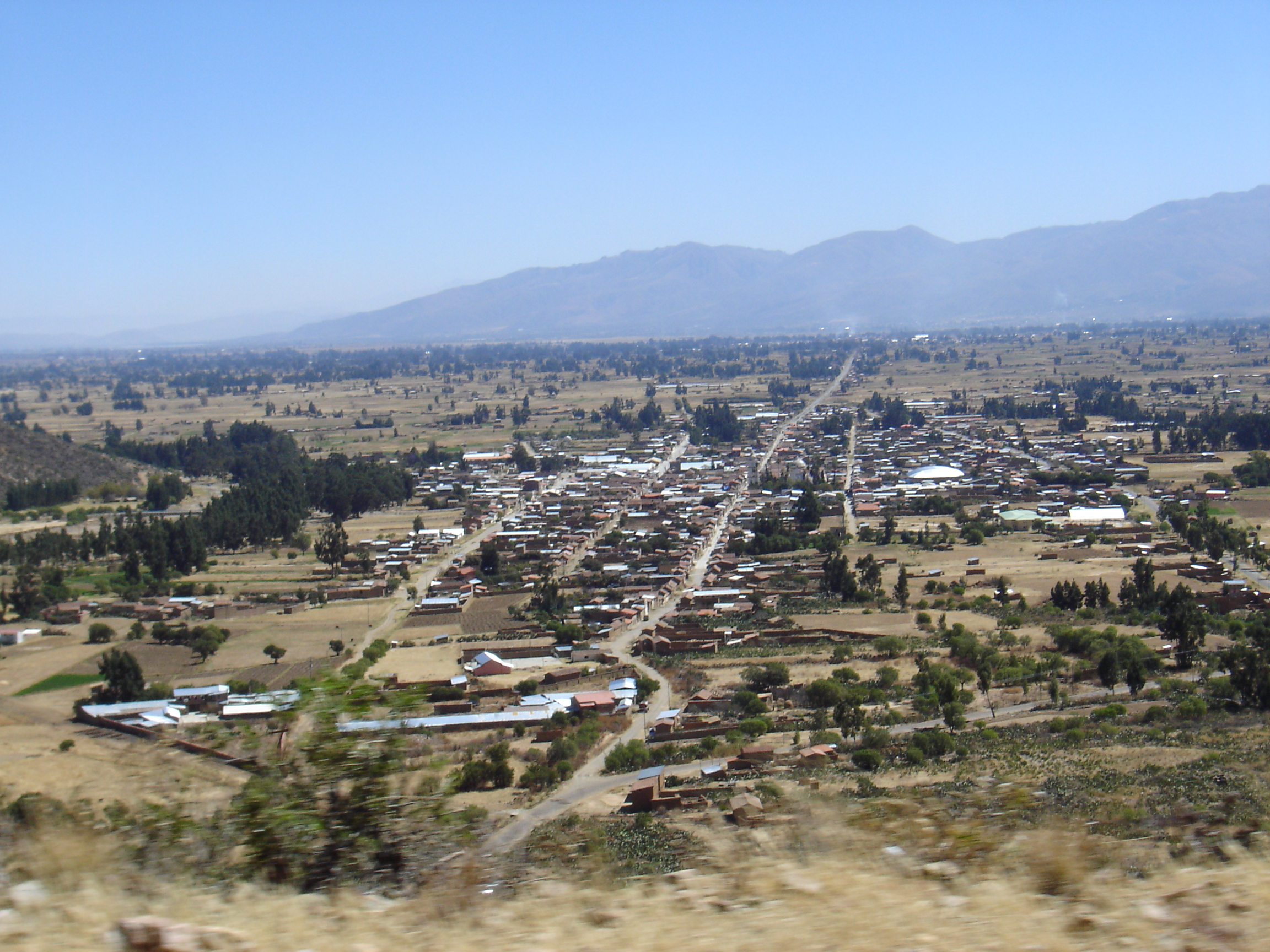
- Arani

- Location of the Arani Municipality within Bolivia
- Coordinates: 17°34′0″S 65°46′0″W
- Country: Bolivia
- Department: Cochabamba Department
- Province: Arani Province
- Seat: Arani

Government
  - Mayor: Vicente Rojas Camacho (2007)
  - President: Ramiro Montaño Orellana (2007)

Area
  - Total: 83 sq mi (214 km^{2})

Population (2001)
  - Total: 11,542
  - Ethnicities: Quechuas
- Time zone: UTC-4 (BOT)

Arani Municipality mahallah geocode map

Arani Municipality is the first municipal section of the Arani Province in the Cochabamba Department, Bolivia. Its seat is Arani. At the time of census 2001, the municipality had 11,542 inhabitants.

It is bordered to the north by the Tiraque Province, to the east by the Vacas Municipality, to the south by the Mizque Province and to the west by the Punata Province.

== Subdivision ==
The municipality consists of the following three cantons:

Canton	Inhabitants (2001)	Seat	Inhabitants (2001)
Arani Canton	6,978	Arani / Jarani	3,512
Collpaciaco Canton	3,190	Collpaciaco / Qullpayaku	246
Pocoata Canton	1,374	Pocoata / Puquqwata	685

== Population ==
The people are predominantly indigenous citizens of Quechua descent.

Ethnic group	%
Quechua	87.2
Aymara	0.4
Guaraní, Chiquitos, Moxos	0.2
Not indigenous	12.1
Other indigenous groups	0.1

== Festivities ==
Every year on August 24 the population of Arani celebrates one of its most important Catholic festivities, Virgen La Bella, dedicated to the Virgin Mary, whose image is venerated with much devotion by the residents and people from abroad.

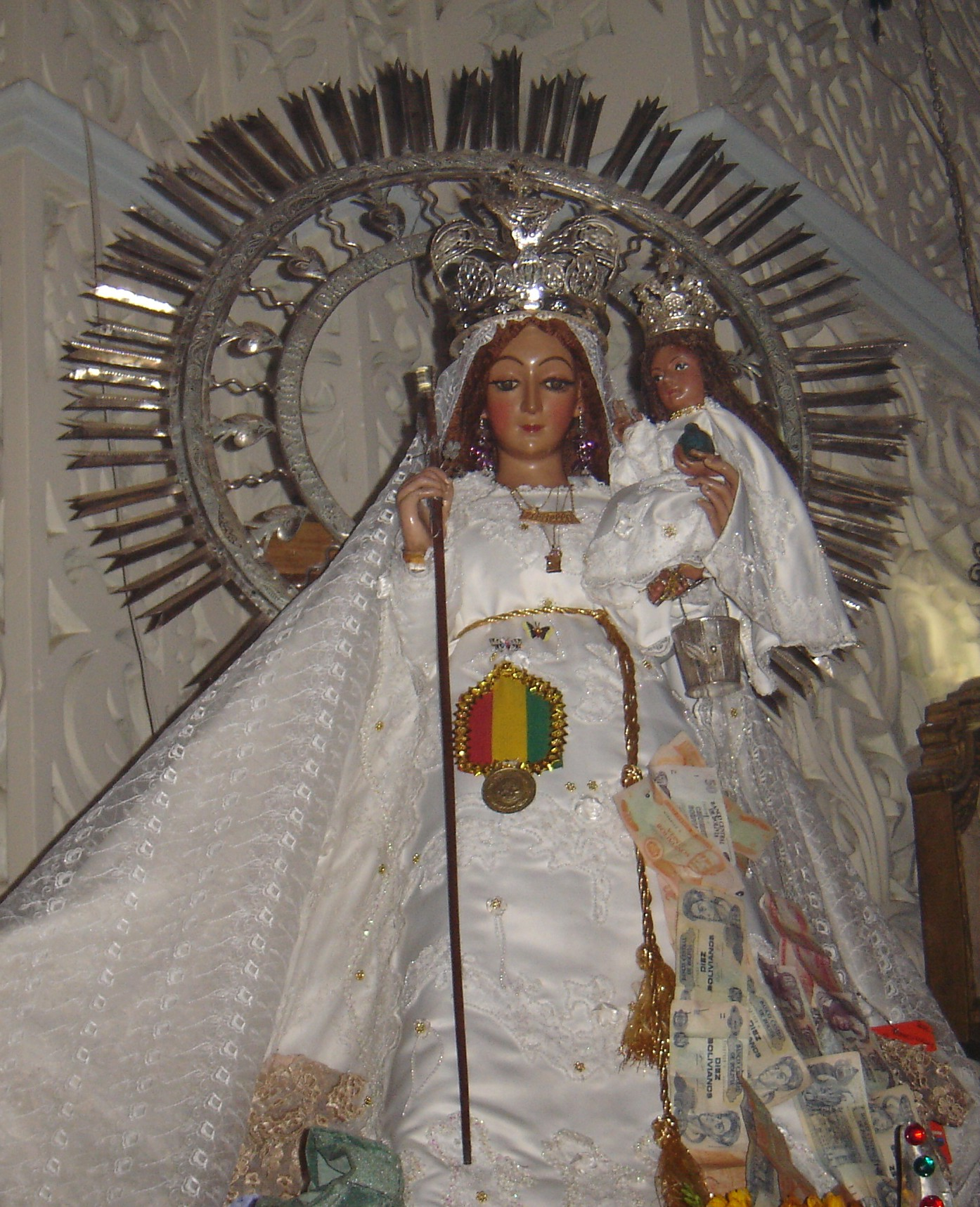
Virgen María La Bella

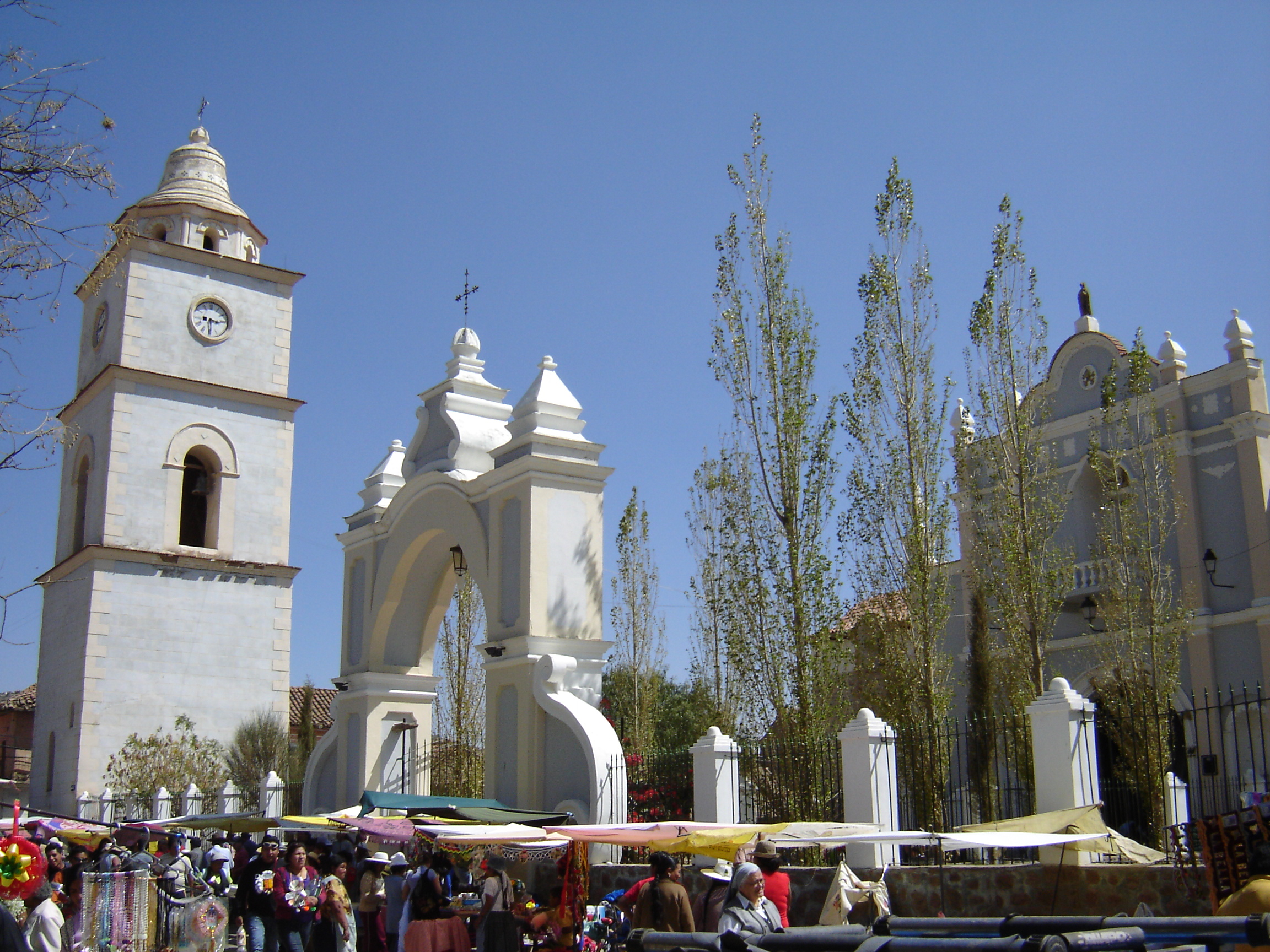
San Bartolomé church in Arani which keeps the shrine of the Virgen La Bella

== See also ==
- K'illi K'illi
