= K'illi K'illi =

Mountain in Bolivia

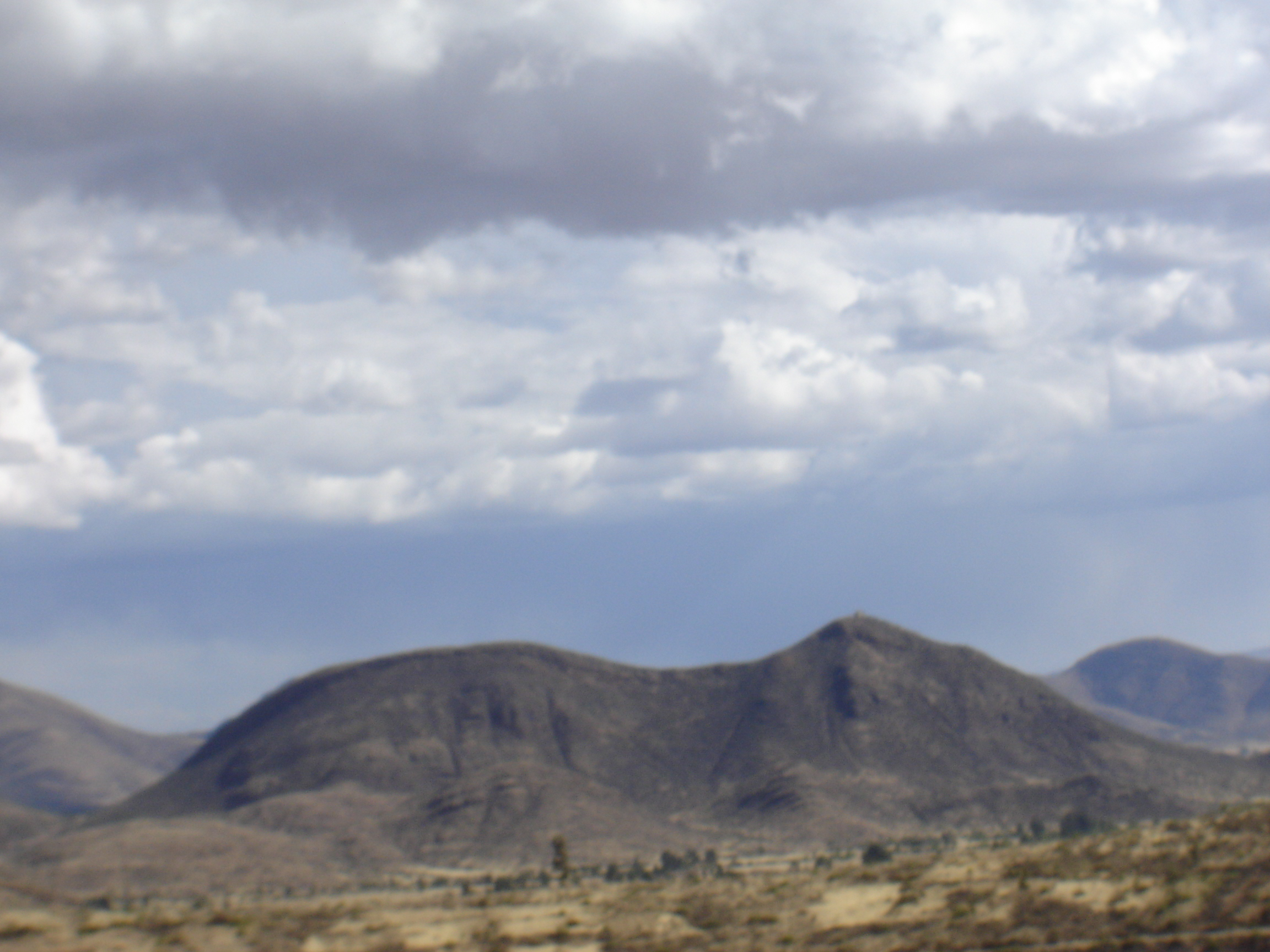
- The mountain K'illi K'illi. Seen from the Arani Province it resembles a sleeping elephant.

Highest point
- Coordinates: 17°36′40.9″S 65°47′36.5″W

Geography
- Location within Bolivia
- Location: Bolivia, Cochabamba Department, Arani Province, Punata Province
- Parent range: Andes

K'illi K'illi (Quechua k'illi American kestrel (Falco sparverius) / fringe, the reduplication indicates that there is a group or a complex of something, Aymara k'illi k'illi a certain bird of prey, a little smaller than a hawk, also spelled Killi Killi) is a mountain in the Andes of Bolivia. It is situated in the Cochabamba Department, at the border of the Arani, Villa Rivero and Tacachi Municipalities of the Arani Province and the Punata Province. Its Spanish nickname is Elefante dormido ("sleeping elephant") because of its shape.

There are two mountains of similar Quechua names in the Arani Municipality, K'illi K'illi Urqu (Quechua urqu mountain, Hispanicized Killi Killi Orkho) north-west of Arani and Jatun K'illi Killi (Quechua jatun big, Jatun Killi Killi) north-east of Arani.

== See also ==
- List of mountains in the Andes
