= Wila Jaqhi (Punata) =

Mountain in Bolivia

- Location within Bolivia

Highest point
- Elevation: 3,808 m (12,493 ft)
- Coordinates: 17°43′26″S 65°43′58″W

Geography
- Location: Bolivia, Cochabamba Department
- Parent range: Andes

Wila Jaqhi (Aymara wila blood, blood-red, jaqhi precipice, cliff, "red cliff", also spelled Wila Jakke) is a 3,808-metre-high (12,493 ft) mountain in the Bolivian Andes. It is located in the Cochabamba Department, Punata Province, Cuchumuela Municipality. Wila Jaqhi lies northeast of Atuq Wachana, southeast of the village of Yana Rumi. The Wila Jaqhi Mayu originates west of the mountain. It flows to the south as an affluent of the Jatun Mayu.
