= Villa Rivero =

- Location within Bolivia
- Coordinates: 17°36′57″S 65°48′38″W
- Country: Bolivia
- State: Cochabamba Department
- Province: Punata Province
- Municipality: Villa Rivero Municipality (Muela Municipality)
- Canton: Villa Rivero Canton
- Elevation: 2,735 m (8,973 ft)

Population (2001)
  - Total: 671
- Time zone: UTC-4 (BOT)

Villa Rivero, Rivero, or Muela is a village in the Cochabamba Department, Bolivia. It is the seat of the Villa Rivero Municipality (or Muela Municipality), the second municipal section of the Punata Province. At the time of the 2001 census it had a population of 671. The size of the population of Muela is not unusual, considering Bolivia's population density of 8.9 inhabitants per square kilometre (23/sq mi) in the 2001 census. As is the case with most of Bolivia's territory, this village is situated at high altitude, with nearby glacial lakes approximately 5 km (3.1 mi) from Piscumayu.

The village is known for its beautiful architecture and is named after named after Francisco del Rivero, a hero of the Cochabamba Revolution. The word "Rivero" is not to be confused with the Spanish word for river. Villa Rivero's central square, Plaza Principal, is considered an important local attraction. The village itself was constructed in the early 19th century and has a fairly large Afro-Bolivian community. Many migrants moved to the village in the 20th century to escape violence and poverty in Bolivia's larger cities. Villa Rivero is also the birthplace of Bolivian president Villaroel Lopez.
