= Tacachi Municipality =

- Municipality
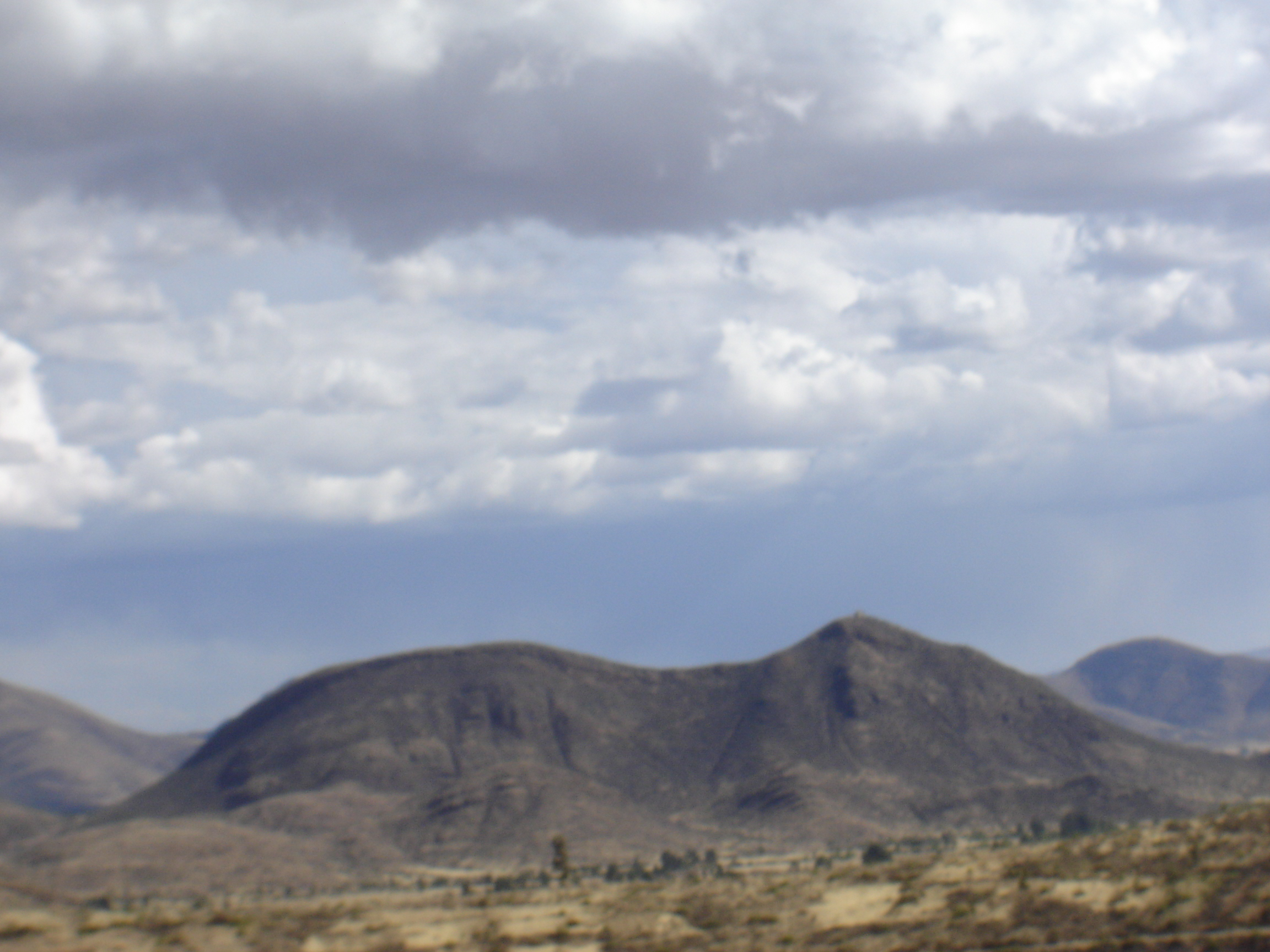
- Mount K'ili K'ili in Tacachi Municipality seen from Arani as "sleeping elephant"

- Location within Bolivia
- Coordinates: 17°38′S 65°47′W
- Country: Bolivia
- Department: Cochabamba Department
- Province: Punata Province
- Seat: Tacachi

Government
  - Mayor: Jhonny Ireneo Alvarez Terrazas (2007)
  - President: Julieta Zurita Claure
- Elevation: 9,800 ft (3,000 m)

Population (2001)
  - Total: 1,076
- Time zone: UTC-4 (BOT)

Tacachi Municipality is the fourth municipal section of the Punata Province in the Cochabamba Department in Bolivia. Its seat is Tacachi.

== Cantons ==
The municipality consists of only one canton, Tacachi Canton. It is identical to the municipality.

== Languages ==
The languages spoken in the Tacachi Municipality are mainly Quechua and Spanish.

| Language | Inhabitants |
|---|---|
| Quechua | 953 |
| Aymara | 4 |
| Guaraní | 1 |
| Another native | 0 |
| Spanish | 674 |
| Foreign | 3 |
| Only native | 350 |
| Native and Spanish | 603 |
| Only Spanish | 71 |

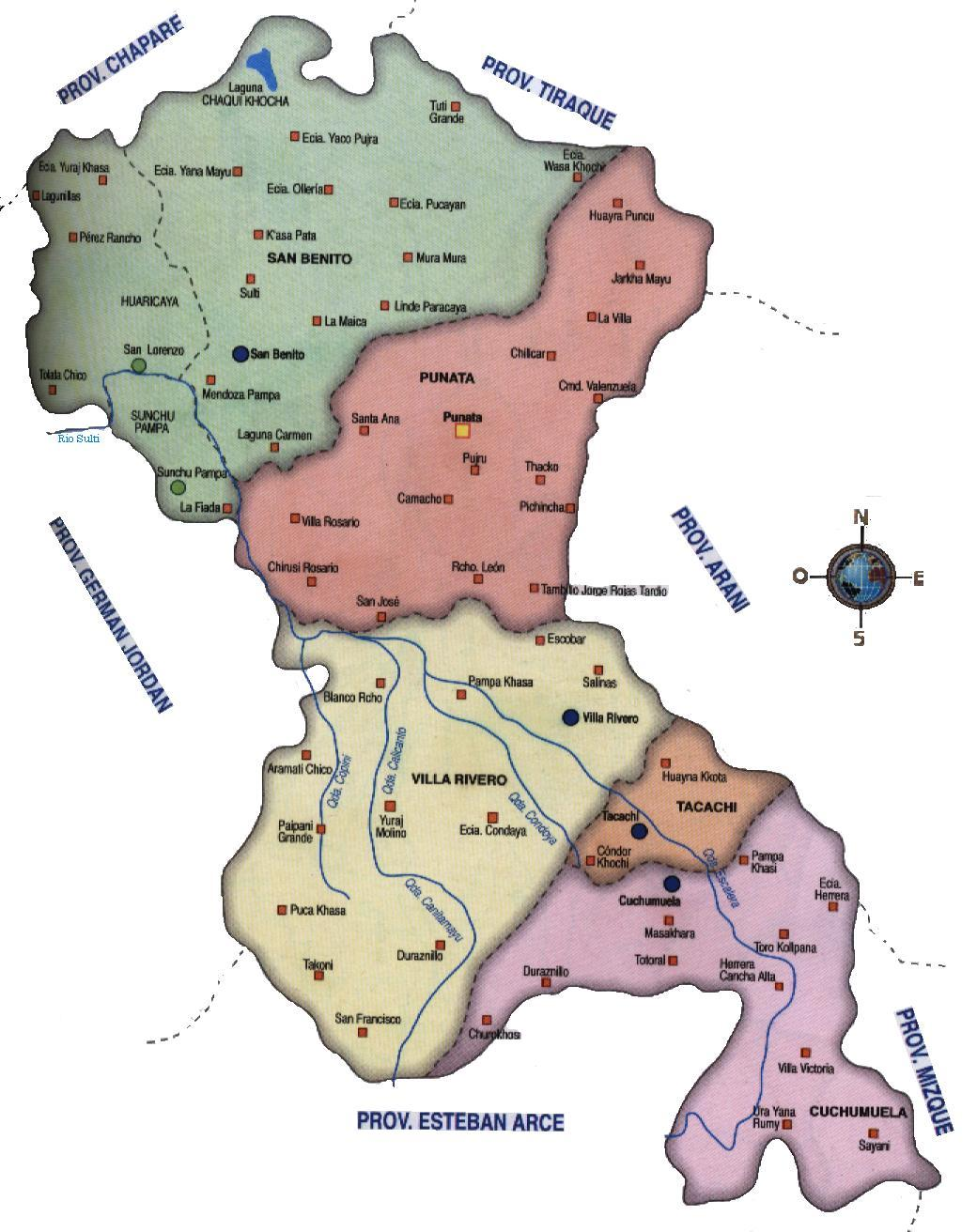
Political map of Punata Province

== See also ==
- K'illi K'illi
