= Punata Municipality =

- Municipality
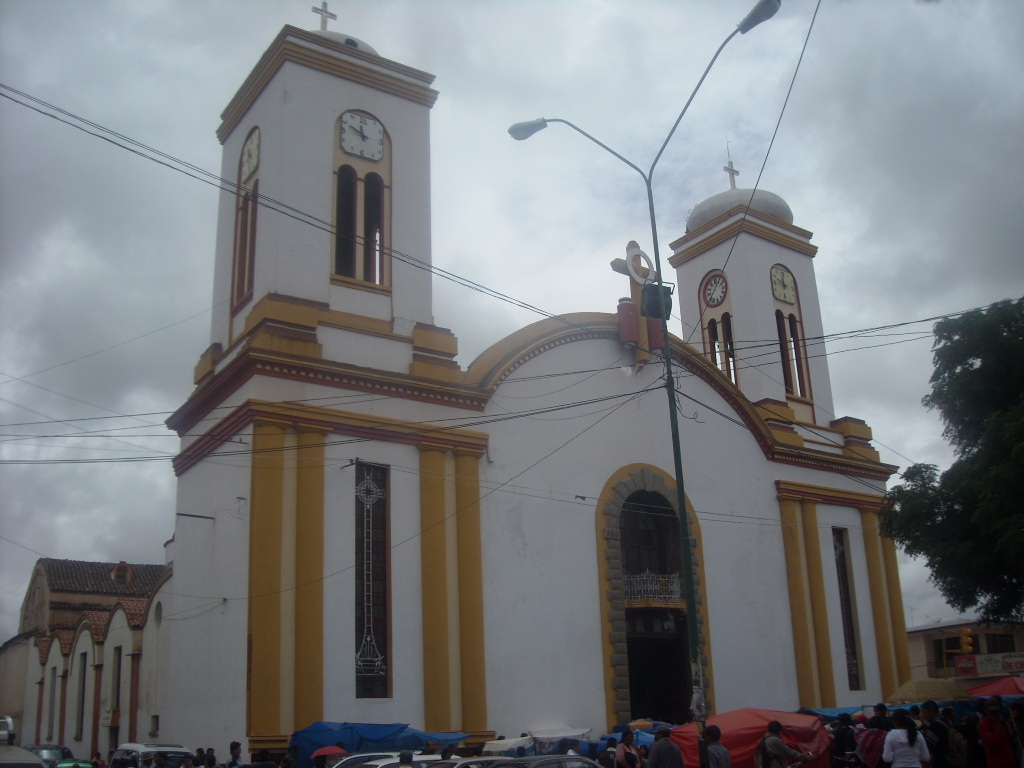
- John the Baptist (San Juan Bautista) church in Punata

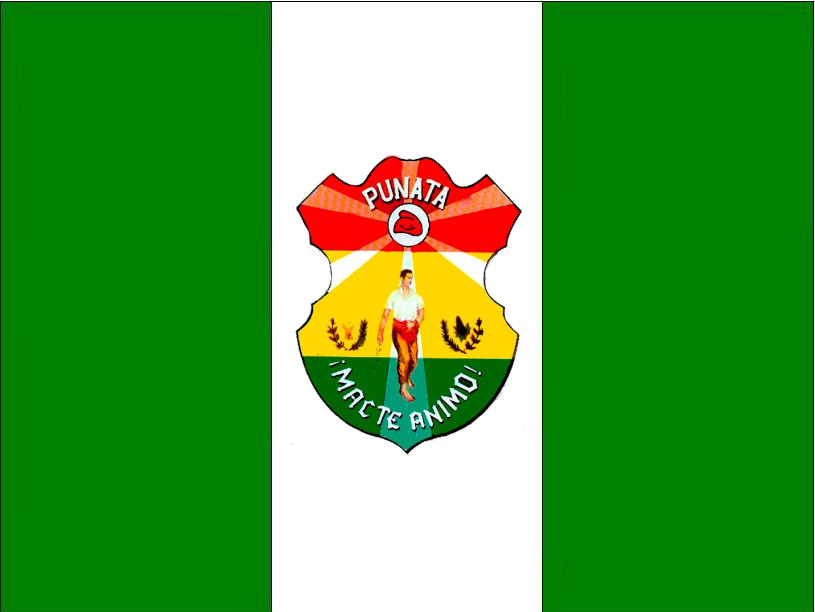
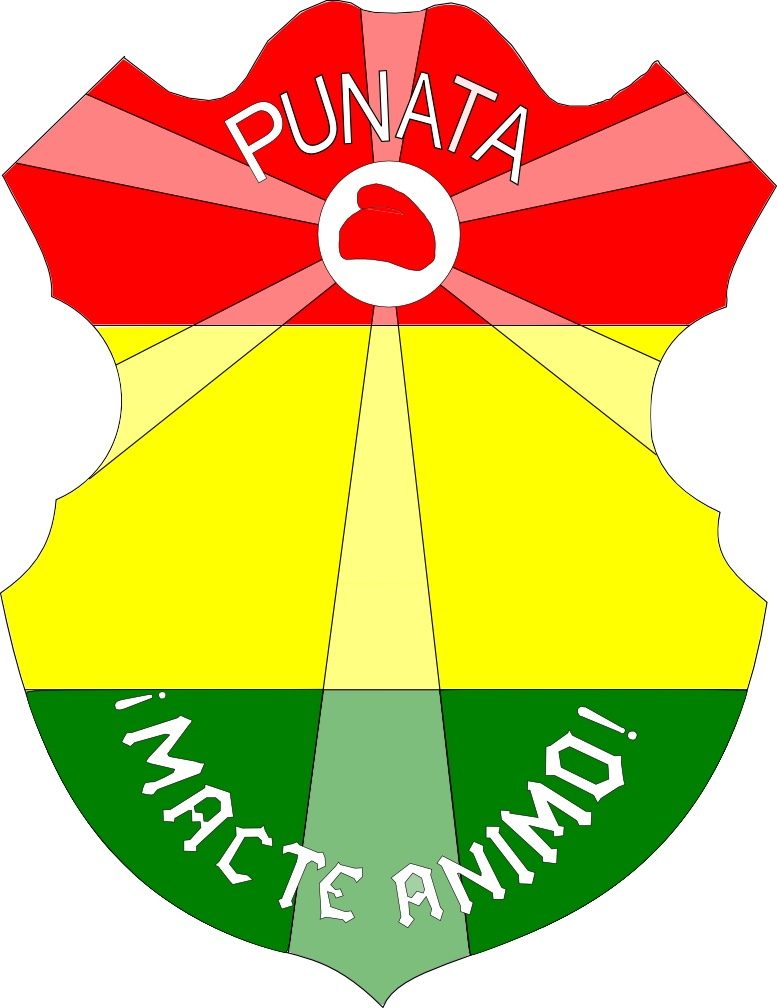
- Flag Coat of arms

- Location of the Punata Municipality within Bolivia
- Coordinates: 17°33′0″S 65°50′0″W
- Country: Bolivia
- Department: Cochabamba Department
- Province: Punata Province
- Seat: Punata

Government
  - Mayor: Leticia Camacho (MAS-IPSP)

Area
  - Total: 33 sq mi (85 km^{2})

Population (2001)
  - Total: 26,140
  - Ethnicities: Quechuas
- Time zone: UTC-4 (BOT)

Punata Municipality is the first municipal section of the Punata Province in the Cochabamba Department, Bolivia. Its capital is Punata. At the time of census 2001 the municipality had 26,140 inhabitants.

== Cantons ==
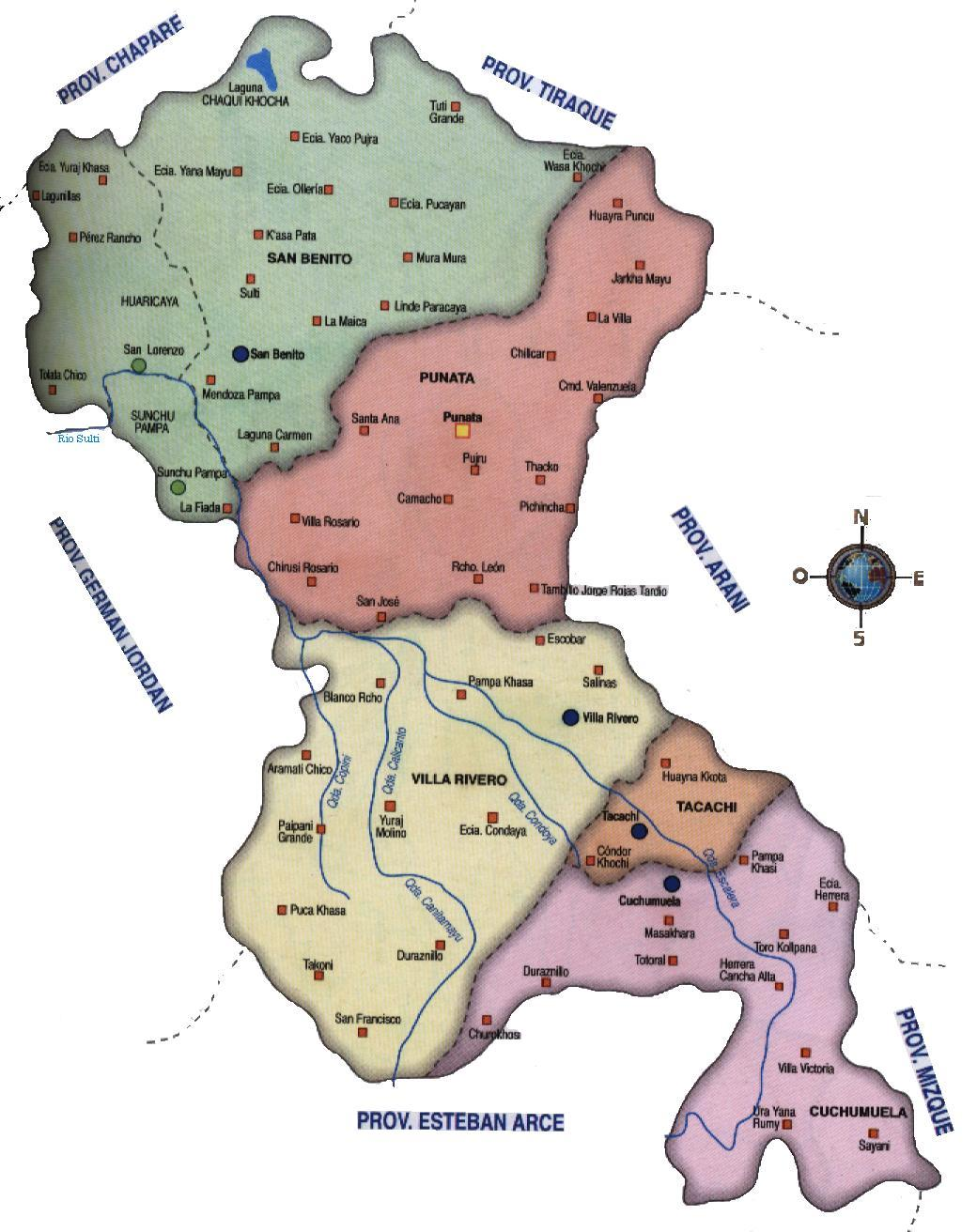
Political map of Punata Province

The municipality consists of only one canton, Punata Canton. It is identical to the municipality.

== Government ==
The government of Punata Municipality is divided into the executive and legislative branches. The Mayor of Punata is the head of the city government, elected for a term of five years by general election. The legislative branch consists of the Municipal Council, which elects a President, Vice President and Secretary from a group of seven members.

The current mayor of Punata is Leticia Camacho, who has served in that post on an interim basis, since the removal of Víctor Balderrama, who won both of the previous two elections. Balderrama, of the Insurgente Martín Uchu party, was suspended under indictment for aggravated rape of a minor on August 10, 2010 (for which he was convicted September 2011), and resigned to resign to allow new elections. A special election for mayor was scheduled to be held on 13 January 2013.

Víctor Balderrama Arias won a strong majority of 74% in the 4 April 2010 elections and his party, Insurgente Martín Uchu, controls five of the seven council seats.

Date Began	Date Ended	Mayor	Party	Notes
1992	1993	José Antonio Gonzales Alvarado	Political Accord (MIR–ADN)	
1995	1995	José Antonio Gonzales Alvarado	Revolutionary Left Movement (Bolivia) (MIR)	
1997	2002	José Antonio Gonzales Alvarado	Revolutionary Nationalist Movement	
2004		Víctor Balderrama Arias	Insurgente Martín Uchu	Elected with 63% of the vote. Balderrama's first administration was marked by open conflict with the Municipal Council, who sought his removal. Balderrama recognized the alternate members of the Council instead during a crisis in 2007. Meanwhile, the titular council members met in Camacho Rancho for a year, from where they pressed legal demands against the mayoral administration.
May 30, 2010	August 10, 2010	Víctor Balderrama Arias	Insurgente Martín Uchu	Re-elected with 74% of the vote on 4 April 2010. Suspended August 10, 2010
August 10, 2010	Interim incumbent, pending special election	Leticia Camacho	MAS-IPSP	
