= Cuchumuela Municipality =

- Municipality
- Flag

- Location within Bolivia
- Coordinates: 17°40′S 65°45′W
- Country: Bolivia
- Department: Cochabamba Department
- Province: Punata Province
- Seat: Cuchumuela

Government
  - Mayor: David Guevara Velasquez (2007)
  - President: Vitaliano Ovando Velarde (2007)

Population (2001)
  - Total: 1,942
  - Ethnicities: Quechuas
- Time zone: UTC-4 (BOT)

Cuchumuela Municipality or Villa Gualberto Villarroel Municipality is the fifth municipal section of the Punata Province in the Cochabamba Department, Bolivia. Its seat is Cuchumuela.

== Cantons ==
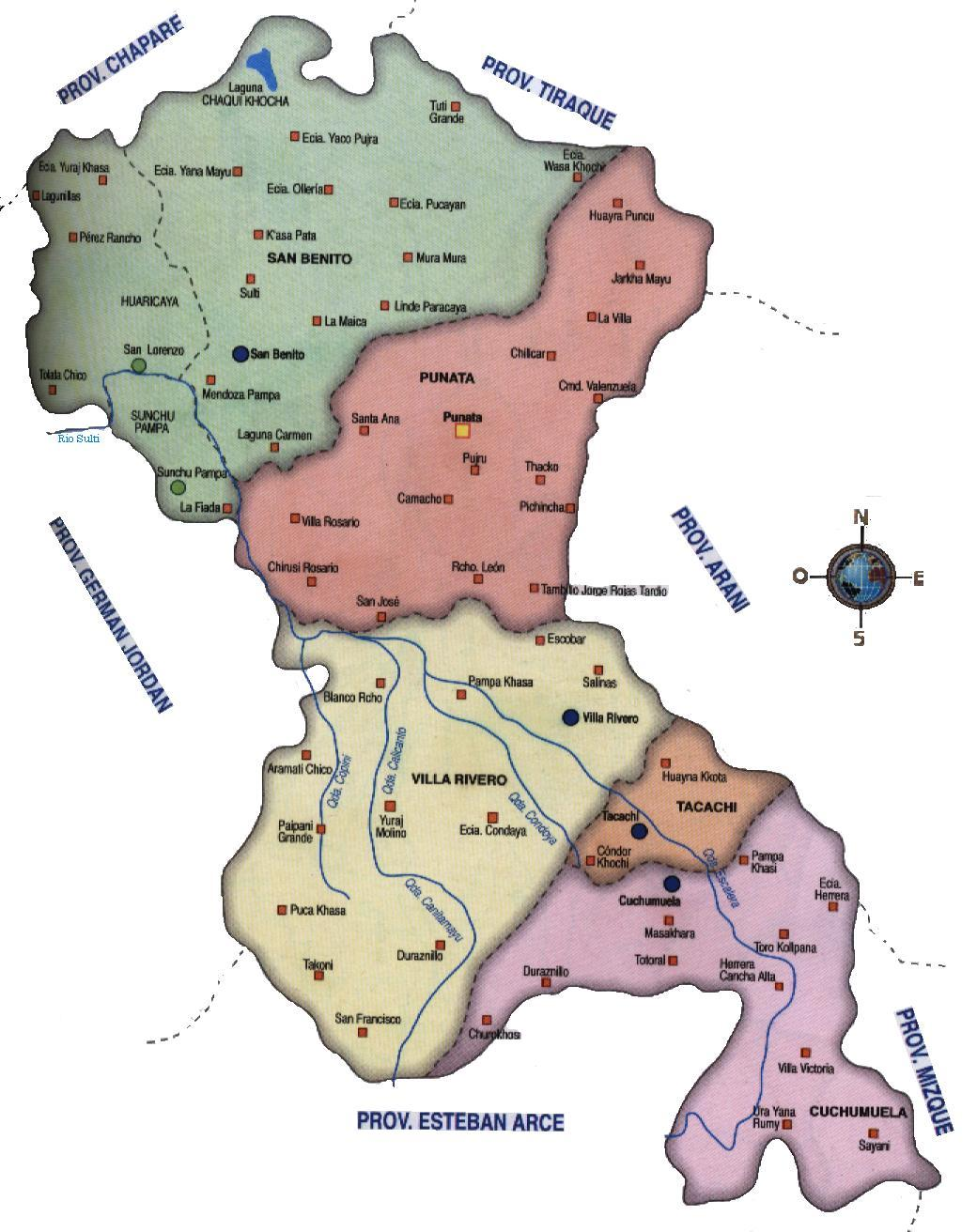
Political map of Punata Province

The municipality consists of only one canton, Cuchumuela Canton. It is identical to the municipality.

== See also ==
- Atuq Wachana
- Wila Jaqhi
