= Villa Rivero Municipality =

- Municipality
- Location within Bolivia
- Coordinates: 17°39′S 65°40′W
- Country: Bolivia
- Department: Cochabamba Department
- Province: Punata Province
- Seat: Villa Rivero

Government
  - Mayor: Freddy Lara Guillén (2007)
  - President: Freddy Lara Guillén (2005)

Population (2001)
  - Total: 5,857
- Time zone: UTC-4 (BOT)

Villa Rivero Municipality or Muela Municipality is the second municipal section of the Punata Province in the Cochabamba Department in Bolivia. Its seat is Villa Rivero.

== Cantons ==
The municipality consists of only one canton, Villa Rivero Canton. It is identical to the municipality.

== Languages ==
The languages spoken in the Villa Rivero Municipality are mainly Quechua and Spanish.

Language	Inhabitants
Quechua	5.387
Aymara	16
Guaraní	4
Another native	7
Spanish	3.394
Foreign	14
Only native	2.201
Native and Spanish	3.194
Only Spanish	200

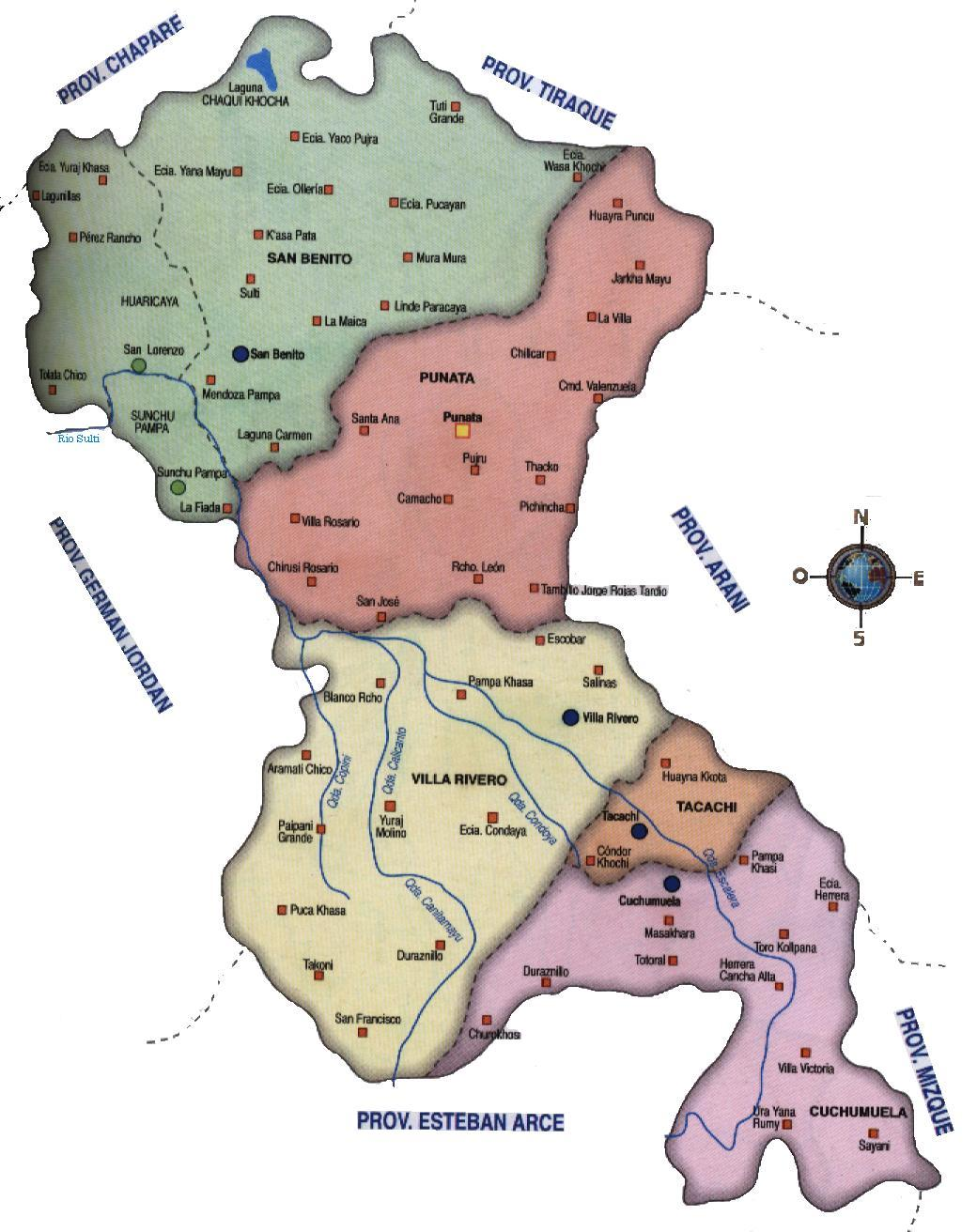
Political map of Punata Province

== See also ==
- K'illi K'illi
