= San Benito Municipality =

- Municipality
- Location of the Municipality within Bolivia
- Coordinates: 17°30′0″S 65°53′0″W
- Country: Bolivia
- Department: Cochabamba Department
- Province: Punata Province
- Seat: San Benito

Government
  - Mayor: Remy Rodrigo Balderrama Arnez (2007)
  - President: Hernan Claros Montaño (2007)

Area
  - Total: 54 sq mi (140 km^{2})

Population (2001)
  - Total: 12,720
- Time zone: UTC-4 (BOT)

San Benito Municipality or Villa José Quintín Mendoza Municipality is the third municipal section of the Punata Province in the Cochabamba Department, Bolivia. Its seat is San Benito. At the time of census 2001 the municipality had 12,720 inhabitants.

== Cantons ==
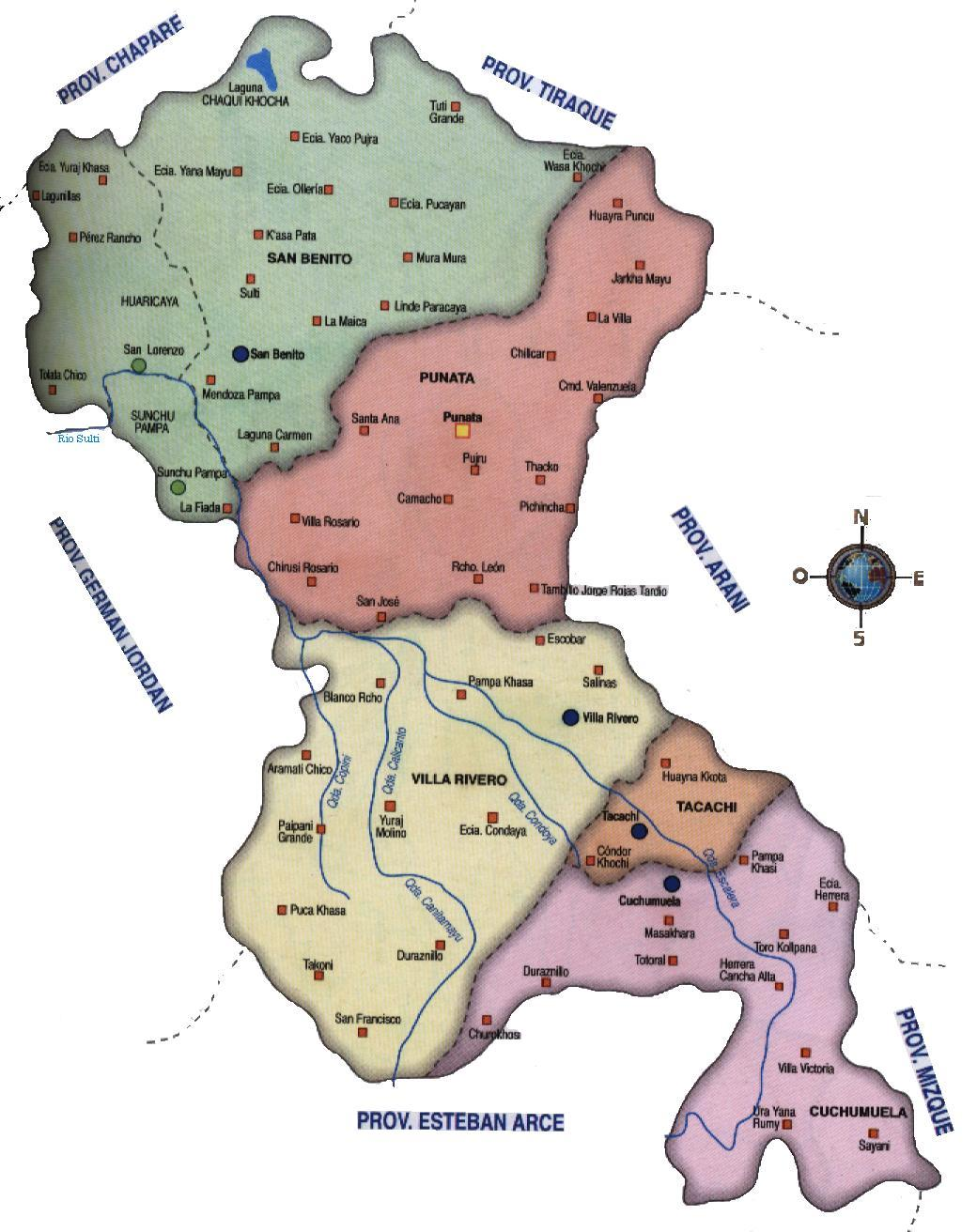
Political map of Punata Province

The municipality is divided into three cantons. They are (their seats in parentheses):

- Huaricaya Canton or San Lorenzo Canton - (San Lorenzo)
- San Benito Canton or Villa José Quintín Mendoza Canton - (San Benito)
- Sunchu Pampa Canton - (Sunchu Pampa)
