= Tacachi =

- Town
- Location within Bolivia
- Coordinates: 17°38′S 65°48′W
- Country: Bolivia
- Department: Cochabamba Department
- Province: Punata Province
- Municipality: Tacachi Municipality
- Canton: Tacachi Canton
- Elevation: 9,229 ft (2,813 m)

Population (2001)
  - Total: 750
- Time zone: UTC-4 (BOT)

Tacachi is a location in the Cochabamba Department in central Bolivia. It is the seat of the Tacachi Municipality, the fourth municipal section of the Punata Province.
