= Cuchumuela =

- Town
- Location within Bolivia
- Coordinates: 17°38′S 65°47′W
- Country: Bolivia
- Department: Cochabamba Department
- Province: Punata Province
- Municipality: Cuchumuela Municipality

Government
  - Mayor: David Guevara Velasquez (2007)
  - President: Vitaliano Ovando Velarde (2007)

Population (2001)
  - Total: 448
- Time zone: UTC-4 (BOT)

Cuchumuela or Khuchumuela is a location in the Cochabamba Department in central Bolivia. It is the seat of the Cuchumuela Municipality, the fifth municipal section of the Punata Province.
