= Punata Province =

- Province
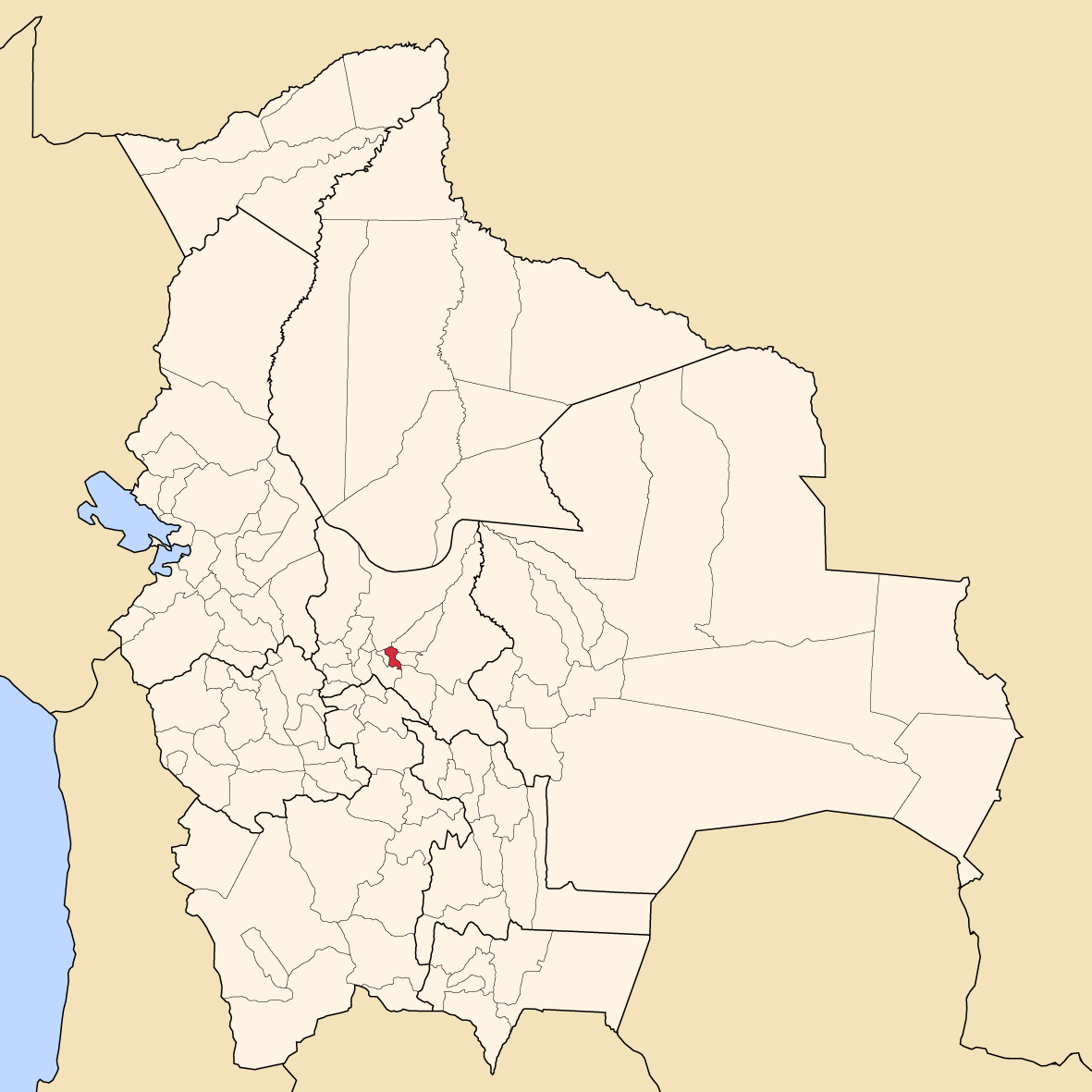
- Location of the Punata Province within Bolivia

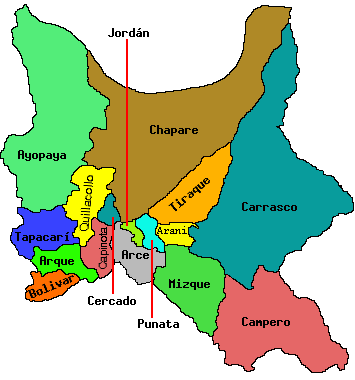
- Provinces of the Cochabamba Department
- Coordinates: 17°35′0″S 66°15′0″W
- Country: Bolivia
- Department: Cochabamba
- Capital: Punata

Area
  - Total: 330 sq mi (850 km^{2})
- Elevation: 9,020 ft (2,750 m)

Population (2024 census)
  - Total: 61,382
  - Density: 190/sq mi (72/km^{2})
- Time zone: UTC-4 (BOT)

Punata is a province almost in the middle of the Cochabamba Department, Bolivia, located about 45 km south of the city of Cochabamba. Its capital is Punata. The province is limited to the north by the Chapare Province, to the north-east by the Tiraque Province, to the east by the Arani Province, to the south-east by the Mizque Province, to the south by the Esteban Arze Province and to the west by the Germán Jordán Province.

Its archaeological and historical sites are the main interest for foreign tourists.

== Subdivision ==
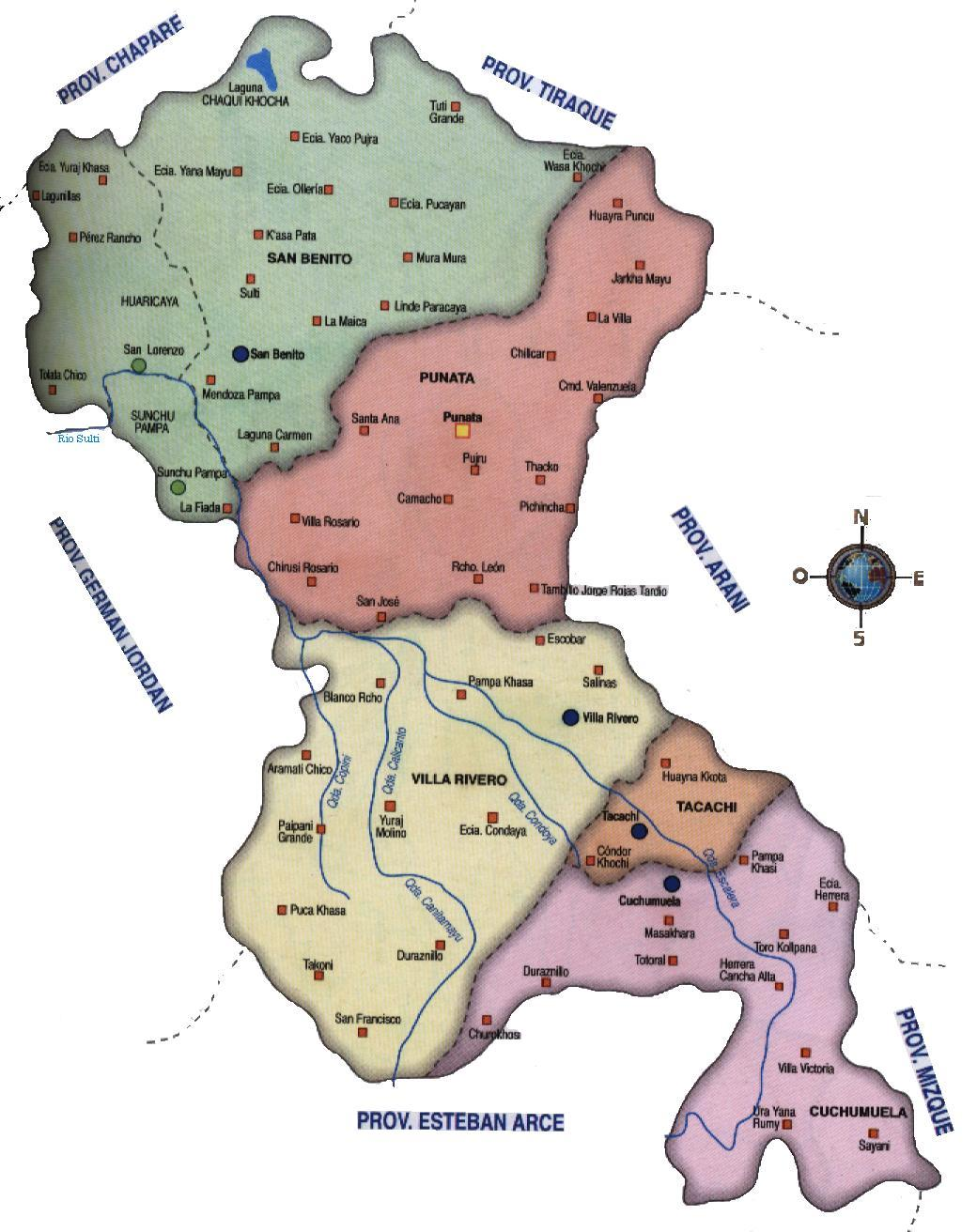
Political map of Punata Province

Punata Province is divided into five municipalities which are partly further subdivided into cantons.

Section	Municipality	Seat
1st	Punata Municipality	Punata
2nd	Villa Rivero Municipality or Muela Municipality	Villa Rivero
3rd	San Benito Municipality or Villa José Quintín Mendoza Municipality	San Benito
4th	Tacachi Municipality	Tacachi
5th	Cuchumuela Municipality or Villa Gualberto Villarroel Municipality	Cuchumuela

== The people ==
The people are predominantly indigenous citizens of Quechuan descent. By 2001 census was counted 47735 inhabitants and it rose to 54409 inhabitants by the 2012 census. The economic center is the city of Punata with 28707 inhabitants.

Ethnic group	Punata Municipality (%)	Villa Rivero Municipality (%)	San Benito Municipality (%)	Tacachi Municipality (%)	Cuchumuela Municipality (%)
Quechua	76.2	93.8	87.1	92.9	94.3
Aymara	0.8	0.1	0.6	0.1	0.4
Guaraní, Chiquitos, Moxos	0.1	0.0	0.1	0.0	0.2
Not indigenous	22.7	6.0	12.1	7.0	4.9
Other indigenous groups	0.2	0.0	0.1	0.0	0.2

Ref: obd.descentralizacion.gov.bo

== Languages ==
The languages spoken in the Punata Province are mainly Quechua and Spanish. The following table shows the number of those belonging to the recognized group of speakers.

Language	Punata Municipality	Villa Rivero Municipality	San Benito Municipality	Tacachi Municipality	Cuchumuela Municipality
Quechua	21,255	5,387	10,529	953	1,767
Aymara	256	16	94	4	3
Guaraní	25	4	9	1	1
Another native	22	7	6	0	1
Spanish	20,797	3,394	9,650	674	851
Foreign	148	14	48	3	1
Only native	4,232	2,201	2,450	350	968
Native and Spanish	17,096	3,194	8,105	603	801
Only Spanish	3,703	200	1,545	71	50

== Irrigation of the alluvial fan of Punata ==
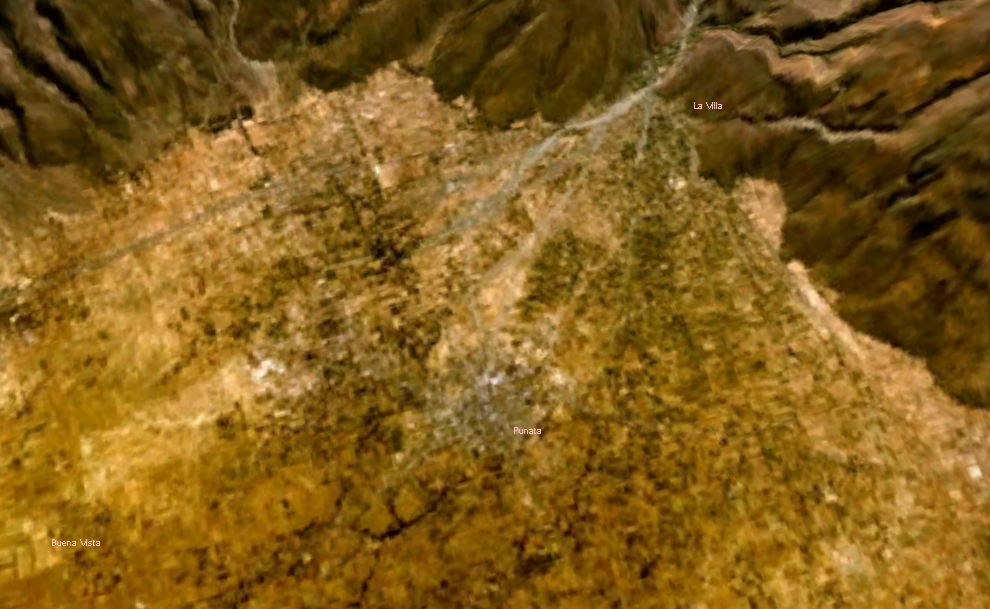
The large alluvial fan of Punata, near Cochabamba, Bolivia. The watershed is located in the Andes mountain range.

Reference: The Punata-Tiraque irrigation project near Cochabamba, Bolivia

The alluvial fan of Punata in the Valle Alto is fed by The Rio Paracaya river with a high average discharge. Consequently, the fan is fairly flat.

The region of Punata, at the upper end of the Valle Alto, at about 2800 m altitude, has a summer rainfall of 400 to 450 mm starting in the second half of November end ending in March. Maize is here the most important food crop, followed by potatoes. Alfalfa is the dominant fodder crop, followed by maize straw. (Fig. P1). These crops could, of old, only be planted successfully because of the existence of additional water resources like runoff, floods, river base-flow and groundwater. In the winter months, crop growth is restricted due to the occurrence of night frosts, especially in June and July, and absence of rains.

The total rural population in Punata is estimated at 25 000. There are about 4000 families of which an estimated 3680 are farmer families. The farms are small. The average size is 1.3 ha of which 1 ha is cropped. The modal size of farm is smaller, about 0.7 ha.

The rainfall distribution in Punata is characterized by a wet season from December to March, a dry season from May to October, and transition months in April and November. The average yearly total is 428 mm (1966 to 1983, San Benito). The rainfall with a probability of exceedance of 75% (R75) on a year basis is 360 mm. Rainfall is not reliable: in the period from 1966 to 1983, the yearly total varied between 246 mm (1982/83) to 591 mm (1968/69).

The river floods during the rainy summer period can be used for irrigation by anyone who wants to. When the river flow recedes, the stream can only be used for rotational irrigation by those who are entitled to take part in it (this is locally called the mita system). By the month of May the river base-flow becomes strongly reduced, and a drought period sets in, lasting into November.

Irrigation is considered desirable to start the cropping season in August/September, so that an early harvest can be obtained. The early harvest has a high market value and reduces peak labor requirements. Further, the irrigation reduces the risk of crop failure and it permits diversification of agricultural produce. Nevertheless, there are some farming communities that have refrained in the past from the extra effort to obtain additional irrigation water and who seemed to be content with purely rain-fed cropping.

At a modest scale, irrigation from deep-wells is also practiced.

In order to satisfy the needs of the majority of the farmers who strongly wish to have additional irrigation water, the irrigation project Punata-Tiraque began to be developed from 1970 onwards. The project entailed the construction of a complicated system of dams and reservoirs up in the Andean mountains (Fig. P2).

The gross area of the Punata projects is estimated at 4600 ha, 90% of which can be used for agriculture or animal husbandry. About 1150 ha of this presently receive irrigation water, either surface water derived from the Laguna Robada or Lluska Kocha dam, or water pumped from the 16 deep wells in the project area (estimated at 350 ha). In addition there are a few hundred hectares that receive occasional water from mita irrigation (wild flooding).

The traditional irrigation method is based on handling large irrigation flows (golpes) per farm at large intervals. The intake structures in the Pucara Mayu river, at the place where it enters the alluvial fan of Punata, would alternately pass water from each of the reservoir systems (Laguna Robada and Lluska Kocha / Muyu Loma) and the natural mita water. The new system has been designed for smaller flows with shorter rotation intervals, but it works continuously for the whole area, so that there is no need anymore to separate the various sources of water. It covers a much larger area than the traditional system and it incorporates the associations of the mita systems (which may have partly the same members), the associations of tube-well systems (which may also have partly the same members) as well as the persons who had no previous water rights.

Hence, the new irrigation system makes it necessary to replace the traditional water rights by a totally new set of rights (and duties). In addition, the farmers will have to get used to new water distribution methods and new field irrigation techniques. Because the new irrigation zones do not correspond to the boundaries of the existing, scattered, Comité’s de Riego (Fig. P3), not only the water management but also the organizational structure will have to be adjusted to the new situation.

Illustrations of the Punata alluvial fan

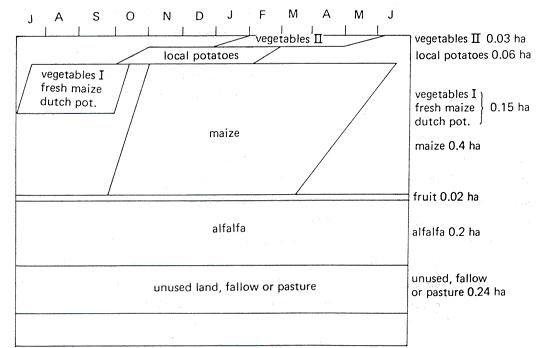
Fig. P1. Typical cropping calendar of an irrigated farm in the Punata area

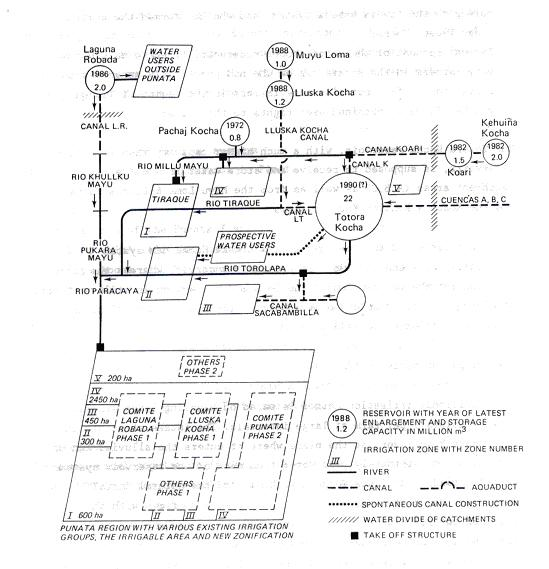
Fig. P2. The irrigation projects in Punata with a complex system of reservoirs, irrigation zones, and water user organizations (Comité's)

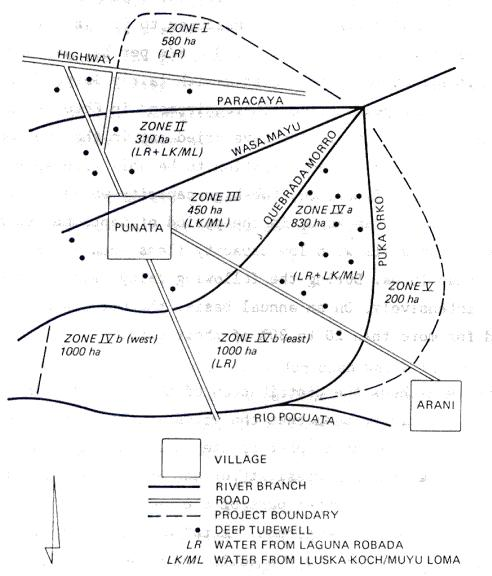
Fig. P3. Sketch of the irrigation zones with sources of surface water and location of deep tube-wells

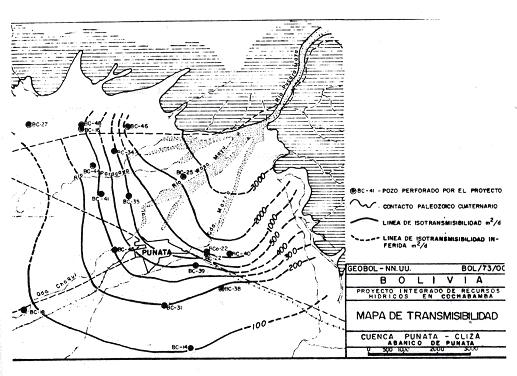
Fig. P4. The permeability and transmissivity of the aquifer diminishes towards the end of the alluvial fan

== See also ==
- Atuq Wachana
- K'illi K'illi
- Wila Jaqhi
