= San Benito, Cochabamba =

San Benito
- Town
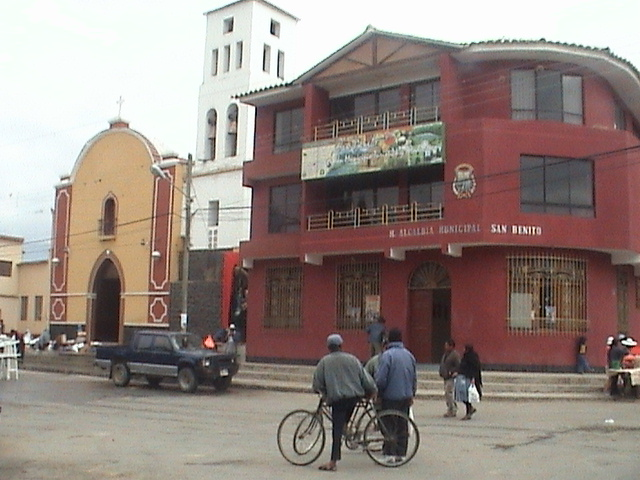
- Church and central place in San Benito

- Location within Bolivia
- Coordinates: 17°31′00″S 65°55′00″W
- Country: Bolivia
- Department: Cochabamba Department
- Province: Punata Province
- Municipality: San Benito Municipality
- Canton: San Benito Canton / Villa José Quintín Mendoza Canton

Government
  - Mayor: Remy Rodrigo Balderrama Arnez (2007)
  - President: Hernan Claros Montaño (2007)

Population (2001)
  - Total: 2,029
- Time zone: UTC-4 (BOT)

San Benito or Villa José Quintín Mendoza is a location in the Cochabamba Department in central Bolivia. It is the seat of the San Benito Municipality, the third municipal section of the Punata Province.
