= Arani, Bolivia =

Arani Jarani
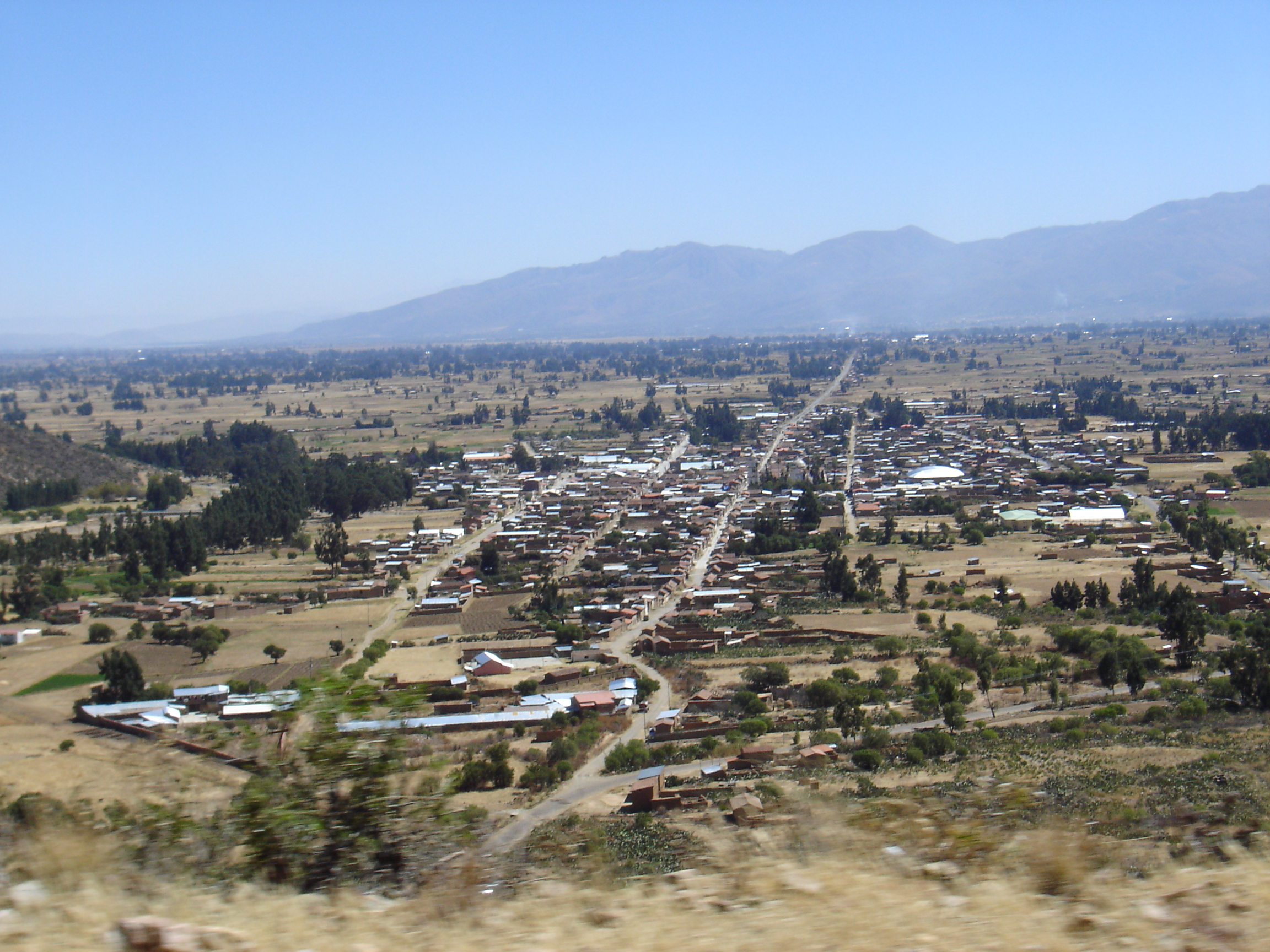
- Nicknames: The Windy City, The Bread City
- Location in Bolivia
- Coordinates: 17°34′S 65°46′W
- Country: Bolivia
- Department: Cochabamba Department
- Province: Arani Province
- Municipality: Arani Municipality
- Canton: Arani Canton
- Elevation: 9,400 ft (2,865 m)

Population (2001)
  - Total: 3,512
- Time zone: UTC-4 (BOT)

Arani, also known as Jarani (from Quechua: jarani or jallmani) is the capital of Arani Province and Arani Municipality located in Cochabamba Department in the center of Bolivia at an altitude of 9,400 ft (2,865 m). At the time of census 2001 it had 3,512 inhabitants.

Arani is well known for its bread due to the traditional use of multiple types of flour for making the bread. Bread is sold in various shops along the main streets leading to the main square, and along the major highway that leads to the city of Cochabamba. There is a bread festival held each year.

During November through early December, the rainy season sets in and heavy rainfall is expected. Due to the geographical location in the valleys, the winds of Arani sometimes cause heavy rainfalls.
