= Chhijmuri =

Mountain in Bolivia

- Location within Bolivia

Highest point
- Elevation: 2,830 m (9,280 ft)
- Coordinates: 17°58′45″S 65°15′28″W

Geography
- Location: Bolivia, Cochabamba Department
- Parent range: Andes

Chhijmuni (Aymara chhijmu edible part of the clover plant, -ri a suffix, also spelled Chijmuri) is a 2,830-metre-high (9,280 ft) mountain in the Bolivian Andes. It is located in the Cochabamba Department, on the border of the Campero Province, Aiquile Municipality, and the Mizque Province, Mizque Municipality, southeast of Mizque. It lies south of the peak of Juch'uy Chhijmuri (Quechua juch'uy small, "small Chhijmuri"). The Chhijmuri Mayu originates east of the peak. It flows to the east.
