= Julpe River =

Julpe

Location
- Country: Bolivia
- Region: Cochabamba Department
- Municipality: Mizque Province, Carrasco Province

Physical characteristics
- Mouth: Mizque River

The Julpe River is a river of Bolivia in the Cochabamba Department, Mizque Province, Mizque Municipality and in the Carrasco Province, Pocona Municipality. It is a left tributary of Mizque River. The confluence is north east of Mizque in the south of the Pocona Municipality.

== See also ==
- List of rivers of Bolivia
