= Wanq'uni (disambiguation) =

Wanq'uni is a volcano in the Barroso mountain range in the Andes of Peru.

Huancuni may also refer to:

- Wanq'uni (Bolivia), a mountain in the La Paz Department, Bolivia
- Wanq'uni (Cochabamba), a mountain in the Cochabamba Department, Bolivia
