= Tuqma Urqu =

Mountain in Bolivia

Tuqma
- Location within Bolivia

Highest point
- Elevation: 2,822 m (9,259 ft)
- Coordinates: 17°52′03″S 65°18′41″W

Geography
- Location: Bolivia, Cochabamba Department
- Parent range: Andes

Tuqma (Quechua tuqma canine tooth, urqu mountain, "canine tooth mountain", also spelled Tucma Orkho) is a 2,822-metre-high (9,259 ft) mountain in the Bolivian Andes. It is located in the Cochabamba Department, Mizque Province, Mizque Municipality. The Tuqma River or Tuqma Mayu (Quechua) which originates northwest of the mountain, south of a peak named Tuqma flows along its western slope.
