= Iskay Ch'utu =

Mountain in Bolivia

- Location within Bolivia

Highest point
- Elevation: 3,440 m (11,290 ft)
- Coordinates: 17°53′52″S 65°45′27″W

Geography
- Location: Bolivia, Cochabamba Department
- Parent range: Andes

Iskay Ch'utu (Quechua iskay two, ch'utu cone, "two cones", also spelled Iskay Chuto) is a mountain in the Bolivian Andes which reaches a height of approximately 3,440 m (11,290 ft). It is located in the Cochabamba Department, Mizque Province, Vila Vila Municipality. Iskay Ch'utu lies northeast of Jatun Urqu and southeast of Tikrasqa.
