= Puka Qallpa =

Mountain in Bolivia

- Location within Bolivia

Highest point
- Elevation: 3,886 m (12,749 ft)
- Coordinates: 17°45′23″S 65°42′06″W

Geography
- Location: Bolivia, Cochabamba Department
- Parent range: Andes

Puka Qallpa (Quechua puka red, qallpa terrain after the harvest, also spelled Puca Khallpa) is a 3,886-metre-high (12,749 ft) mountain in the Bolivian Andes. It is located in the Cochabamba Department, Mizque Province, Alalay Municipality. It lies in the northwest of Kachi Q'asa and northeast of Inka Pirqa. The Puka Urqu Mayu ("red mountain river") flows along its western slope. Its waters flow to the Jatun Mayu ("big river") in the south.
