= Putu Phutunqu =

Mountain in Bolivia

- Location within Bolivia

Highest point
- Elevation: 4,112 m (13,491 ft)
- Coordinates: 17°42′53″S 65°33′02″W

Geography
- Location: Bolivia, Cochabamba Department
- Parent range: Andes

Putu Phutunqu (Aymara putu vault, phutunqu hole, pit, crater, also spelled Putu Putuncu) is a 4,112-metre-high (13,491 ft) mountain in the Bolivian Andes. It is located in the Cochabamba Department, Carrasco Province, Pocona Municipality and in the Mizque Province, Alalay Municipality. Putu Phutunqu lies southeast of Inka Pirqa.
