= Yana Urqu (Mizque) =

Mountain in Bolivia

- Location within Bolivia

Highest point
- Elevation: 3,572 m (11,719 ft)
- Coordinates: 17°48′13″S 65°26′52″W

Geography
- Location: Bolivia, Cochabamba Department
- Parent range: Andes

Yana Urqu (Quechua yana black, urqu mountain, "black mountain", also spelled Yana Orkho) is a 3,572-metre-high (11,719 ft) mountain in the Bolivian Andes. It is located in the Cochabamba Department, Mizque Province, Mizque Municipality. The Yana Urqu Mayu ("black mountain river") originates northwest of the mountain. Its waters flow to the Mizque River.
