= Chullpa Q'asa =

Mountain in Bolivia

- Location within Bolivia

Highest point
- Elevation: 2,826 m (9,272 ft)
- Coordinates: 17°55′54″S 65°47′46″W

Geography
- Location: Bolivia, Cochabamba Department
- Parent range: Andes

Chullpa Q'asa (Quechua chullpa stone tomb, burial tower, q'asa mountain pass, "chullpa pass", also spelled Chullpa Khasa) is a 2,826-metre-high (9,272 ft) mountain in the Bolivian Andes. It is located in the Cochabamba Department, Mizque Province, Vila Vila Municipality. Chullpa Q'asa lies southwest of Jatun Urqu.
