= Rirpu =

Mountain in Bolivia

- Location within Bolivia

Highest point
- Elevation: 3,710 m (12,170 ft)
- Coordinates: 17°48′48″S 65°40′56″W

Geography
- Location: Bolivia, Cochabamba Department
- Parent range: Andes

Rirpu (Quechua for mirror, possibly erroneously also spelled Sirpu) is a 3,710-metre-high (12,170 ft) mountain in the Bolivian Andes. It is located in the Cochabamba Department, Mizque Province, Alalay Municipality. It lies southwest of Wanq'uni.
