= Puka Qawiña =

Mountain in Bolivia

- Location within Bolivia

Highest point
- Elevation: 3,512 m (11,522 ft)
- Coordinates: 17°52′36″S 65°48′08″W

Geography
- Location: Bolivia, Cochabamba Department
- Parent range: Andes

Puka Qawiña (Aymara puka colored, qawiña gable, "red gable", also spelled Puca Cahuiña) is a 3,512-metre-high (11,522 ft) mountain in the Bolivian Andes. It is located in the Cochabamba Department, at the border of the Esteban Arce Province, Anzaldo Municipality, and the Mizque Province, Vila Vila Municipality. Puka Qawiña lies southeast of Tikrasqa, east of the village of Puka Pampa (Puca Pampa).
