= Vila Vila Municipality =

Vila Vila Wila Wila
- Municipality
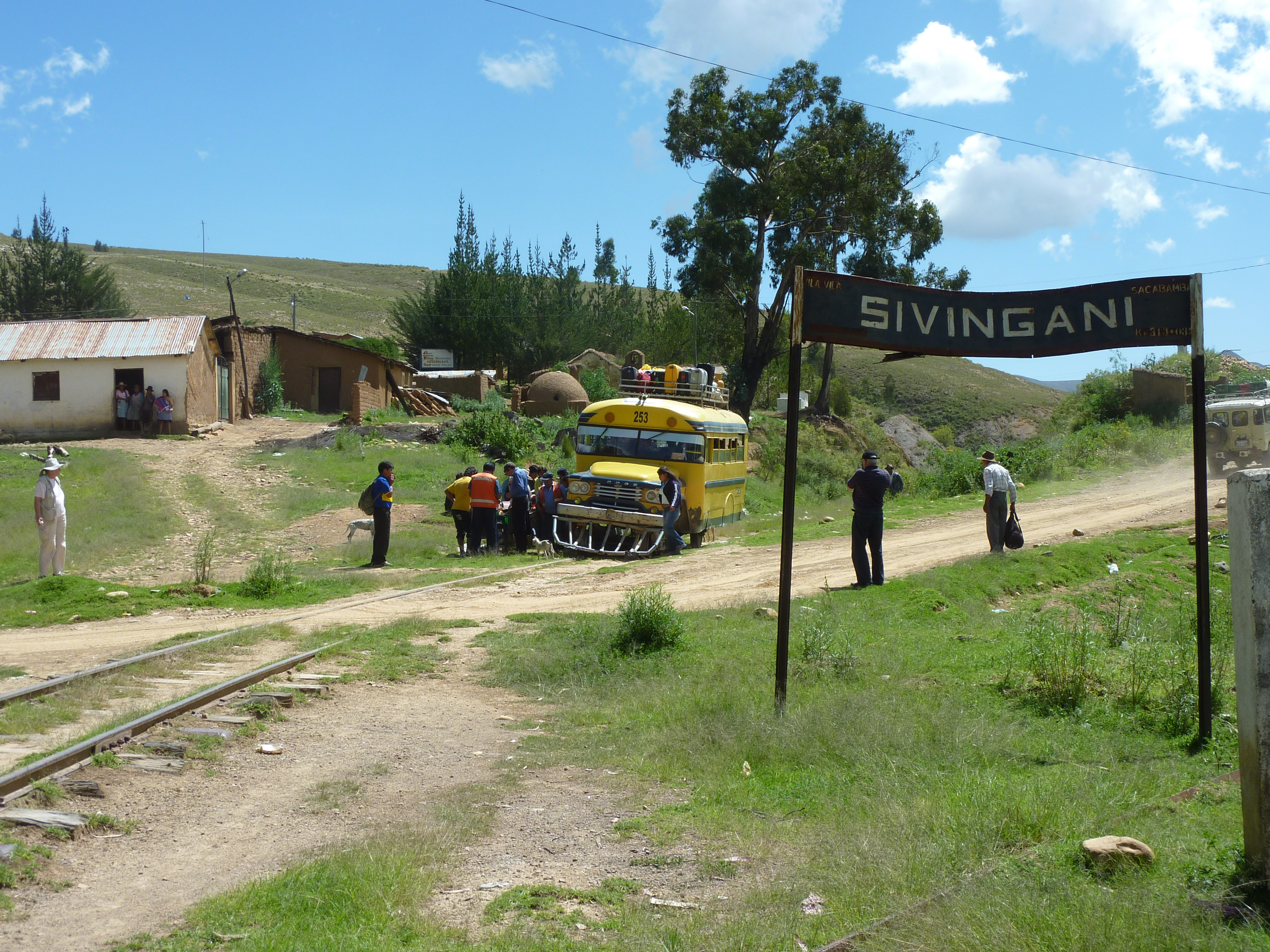
- Train station in Sivingani, Vila Vila Canton

- Flag

- Location within Bolivia
- Coordinates: 17°58′S 65°31′W
- Country: Bolivia
- Department: Cochabamba Department
- Province: Mizque Province
- Seat: Vila Vila

Government
  - Mayor: Juan Siles Pozo
  - President: Teófilo Blanco Meneces

Population (2001)
  - Total: 4,591
  - Ethnicities: Quechua
- Time zone: UTC-4 (BOT)

Vila Vila (in Hispanicized spelling) or Wila Wila (Aymara) is the second municipal section of the Mizque Province in the Cochabamba Department, Bolivia. Its seat is Vila Vila.

== Subdivision ==
Vila Vila Municipality is divided into two cantons.

| Canton | Inhabitants (2001) | Seat |
|---|---|---|
| Vila Vila Canton | 4,268 | Vila Vila |
| Siquimira Canton | 323 | Siquimira |

== See also ==
- Chullpa Q'asa
- Iskay Ch'utu
- Jatun Urqu
- Puka Qawiña
- Tikrasqa
