= Alalay =

- Town
- Location within Bolivia
- Coordinates: 17°41′S 65°41′W
- Country: Bolivia
- Department: Cochabamba Department
- Province: Mizque Province
- Municipality: Alalay Municipality

Population (2001)
  - Total: 638
- Time zone: UTC-4 (BOT)

Alalay is a location in the Cochabamba Department in central Bolivia. It is the seat of the Alalay Municipality, the third municipal section of the Mizque Province.
