= Jatun Ch'utu (Cochabamba) =

Mountain in Bolivia

- Location within Bolivia

Highest point
- Elevation: 3,400 m (11,200 ft)
- Coordinates: 17°47′02″S 65°35′13″W

Geography
- Location: Bolivia, Cochabamba Department
- Parent range: Andes

Jatun Ch'utu (Quechua jatun big, ch'utu cone, "big cone", also spelled Jatun Chutu) is a mountain in the Bolivian Andes which reaches a height of approximately 3,400 m (11,200 ft). It is located in the Cochabamba Department, Mizque Province, Alalay Municipality.
