= Aiquile Municipality =

- Municipality
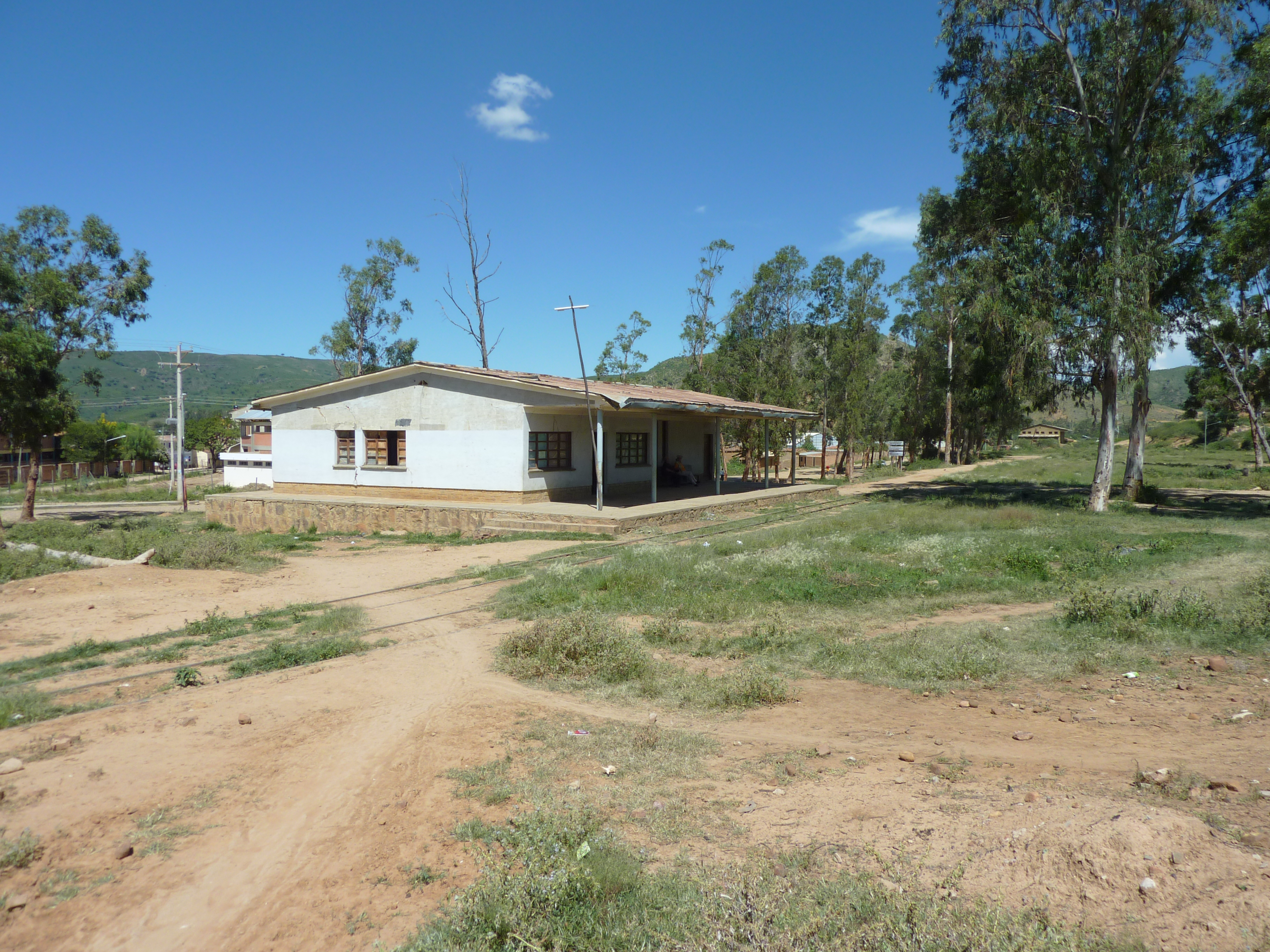
- Aiquile station

- Location within Bolivia
- Coordinates: 18°24′S 65°5′W
- Country: Bolivia
- Department: Cochabamba Department
- Province: Narciso Campero Province
- Cantons: 3
- Seat: Aiquile

Government
  - Mayor: Marina Camacho (2007)

Area
  - Total: 970 sq mi (2,500 km^{2})

Population (2001)
  - Total: 26,181
- Time zone: UTC-4 (BOT)

Aiquile Municipality is the first municipal section of the Narciso Campero Province in the Cochabamba Department, Bolivia. Its seat is Aiquile.

== Cantons ==
The municipality is divided into three cantons. They are (their seats in parentheses):

- Aiquile Canton - (Aiquile)
- Quiroga Canton - (Quiroga)
- Villa Granado Canton - (Villa Granado)

== Languages ==
The languages spoken in the Aiquile Municipality are mainly Quechua and Spanish.

Language	Inhabitants
Quechua	22,661
Aymara	149
Guaraní	20
Another native	51
Spanish	11,210
Foreign	77
Only native	13,283
Native and Spanish	9,431
Only Spanish	1,780

== See also ==
- Chhijmuri
