= Omereque =

- Town
- Location within Bolivia
- Coordinates: 18°06′24″S 64°54′26″W
- Country: Bolivia
- Department: Cochabamba Department
- Province: Narciso Campero Province
- Municipality: Omereque Municipality
- Elevation: 5,210 ft (1,588 m)

Population (2001)
  - Total: 6,071
- Time zone: UTC-4 (BOT)

Omereque is a location in the Cochabamba Department in central Bolivia. It is the seat of the Omereque Municipality, the third municipal section of the Narciso Campero Province.

The archeological site Fuerte de Samaipata is about 115 km away from the town. It is about 187 km away from the city of Potosí.
