= Pasorapa =

- Location within Bolivia
- Coordinates: 18°20′S 64°42′W
- Country: Bolivia
- State: Cochabamba Department
- Province: Narciso Campero Province
- Municipality: Pasorapa Municipality
- Canton: Pasorapa Canton

Government
  - Mayor: Ing. Cintia Avila Rojas (2010)
  - President: Clemente Salguero Padilla (2007)

Population (2001)
  - Total: 1,114
- Time zone: UTC-4 (BOT)

Pasorapa, which comes from paso rápido, (quick step), is a small town in Bolivia located in the southeast of the department of Cochabamba. Pasorapa lies at an elevation of 2,364 m. At the time of census 2001 it had a population of 1,114. Most of the inhabitants speak Spanish, but some others speak Quechua.

There are no documents about the foundation of the town, but a stone was found during the reconstruction of the church in 1952, with the following legend on it:

“This church started to be built on October 8, 1782, with Don Juan Gutierrez being the priest”

The main activity of this place is to raise cattle and farming, It is a very dry area, so they have an artificial lake. It has its well, which is 66 meters deep. The closest city to Pasorapa is Cochabamba, the third largest city in Bolivia. Many people, mainly young adults, would move from Pasorapa to the main cities such as Cochabamba, Sucre, and Santa Cruz. Most of these people travel to Santa Cruz so they may have better job opportunities.

René Barrientos, president of Bolivia between 1964 and 1969, built the first road of Pasorapa that connected it to the rest of Bolivia.

In March 2010, municipal authorities created a new nature reserve of 179,614 hectares (693 sq. mi), comprising 76% of Pasorapa municipality. Authorities are hoping to protect the natural resources and biodiversity of the region, such as the endemic and endangered red-fronted macaw.
