= Vila Vila =

Vila Vila Wila Wila
- Town
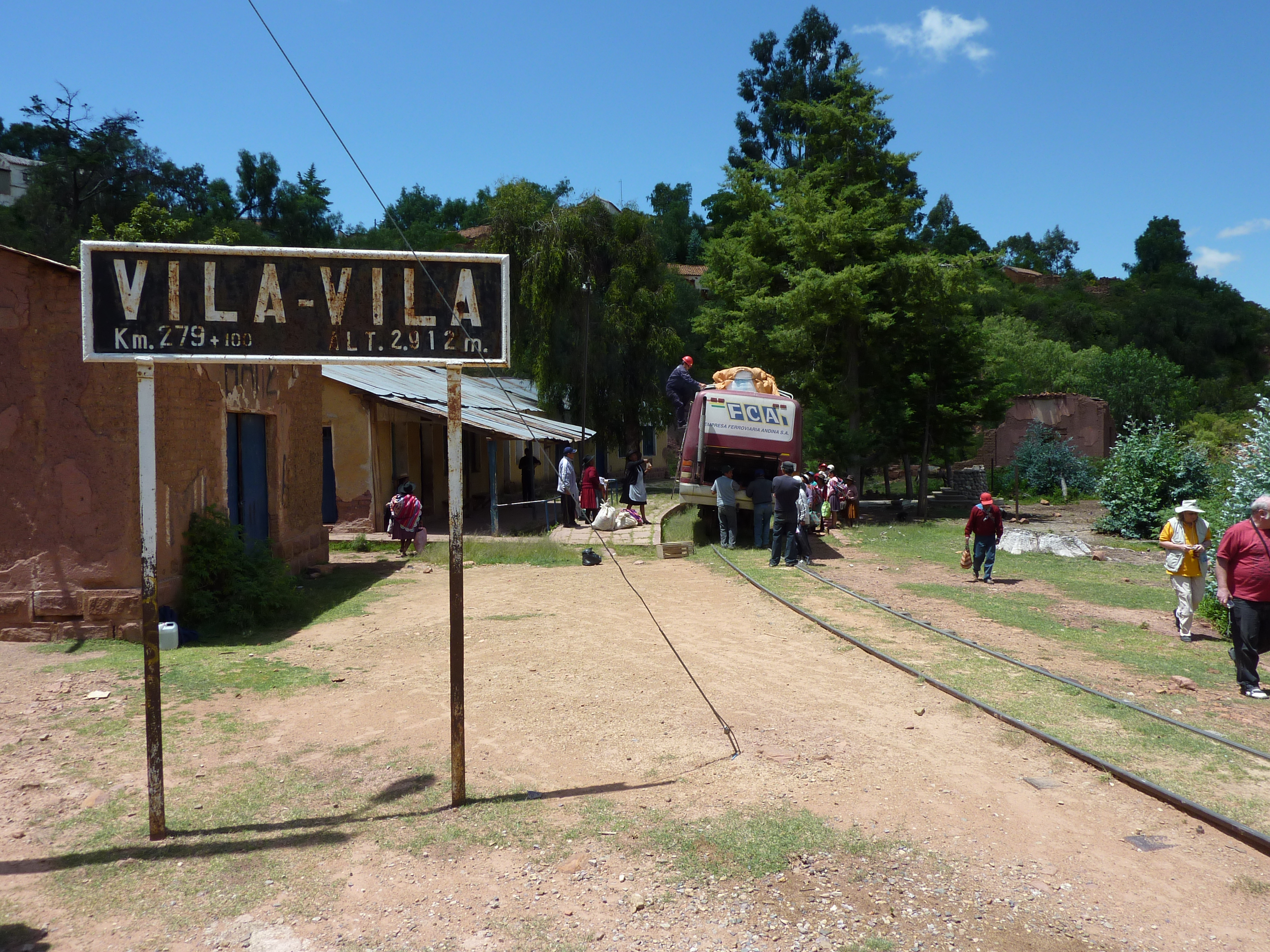
- The area. Sign reads "Vila-Vila"

- Location within Bolivia
- Coordinates: 17°59′00″S 65°36′00″W
- Country: Bolivia
- Department: Cochabamba Department
- Province: Mizque Province
- Municipality: Vila Vila Municipality
- Canton: Vila Vila Canton

Government
  - Mayor: Juan Siles Pozo
  - President: Teófilo Blanco Meneces

Population (2001)
  - Total: 426
- Time zone: UTC-4 (BOT)

Vila Vila is a location in the Cochabamba Department in central Bolivia. It is the seat of the Vila Vila Municipality, the second municipal section of the Mizque Province.
