= Alalay Municipality =

- Municipality
- Location within Bolivia
- Coordinates: 17°50′S 66°29′W
- Country: Bolivia
- Department: Cochabamba Department
- Province: Mizque Province
- Seat: Alalay

Government
  - Mayor: Juan Rosas Camacho (2007)
  - President: Juan Rios Rojas (2007)
- Elevation: 13,000 ft (4,000 m)

Population (2001)
  - Total: 4,931
- Time zone: UTC-4 (BOT)

Alalay Municipality is the third municipal section of the Mizque Province in the Cochabamba Department, Bolivia. Its seat is Alalay.

== Geography ==
Some of the highest mountains of the municipality are listed below:

- Anka
- Apachita
- Apachita Punta
- Chawpi Ch'utu
- Inka P'iqi
- Inka Pirqa
- Jatun Ch'utu
- Kachi Q'asa
- Kimsa Chata
- K'ita
- Misa Punta
- Muru Qullu
- Puka Qallpa
- Pukara
- Putu Phutunqu
- Rirpu
- Qunchu
- Siwinqani
- Tampu Q'asa
- T'utura Q'asa
- Wanq'uni
- Warmi Wañusqa
- Yana Qaqa

== Languages ==
The main languages spoken in the Alalay Municipality Quechua and Spanish.

Language	Inhabitants
Quechua	4,529
Aymara	12
Guaraní	9
Another native	1
Spanish	1,002
Foreign	4
Only native	3,549
Native and Spanish	987
Only Spanish	15
