= Omereque Municipality =

- Municipality
- Location within Bolivia
- Coordinates: 18°2′S 65°31′W
- Country: Bolivia
- Department: Cochabamba Department
- Province: Narciso Campero Province
- Seat: Omereque

Government
  - Mayor: Hector Arce Rodriguez (2007)
  - President: Julian Rocha Sejas (2007)

Population (2001)
  - Total: 6,071
  - Ethnicities: Quechuas
- Time zone: UTC-4 (BOT)

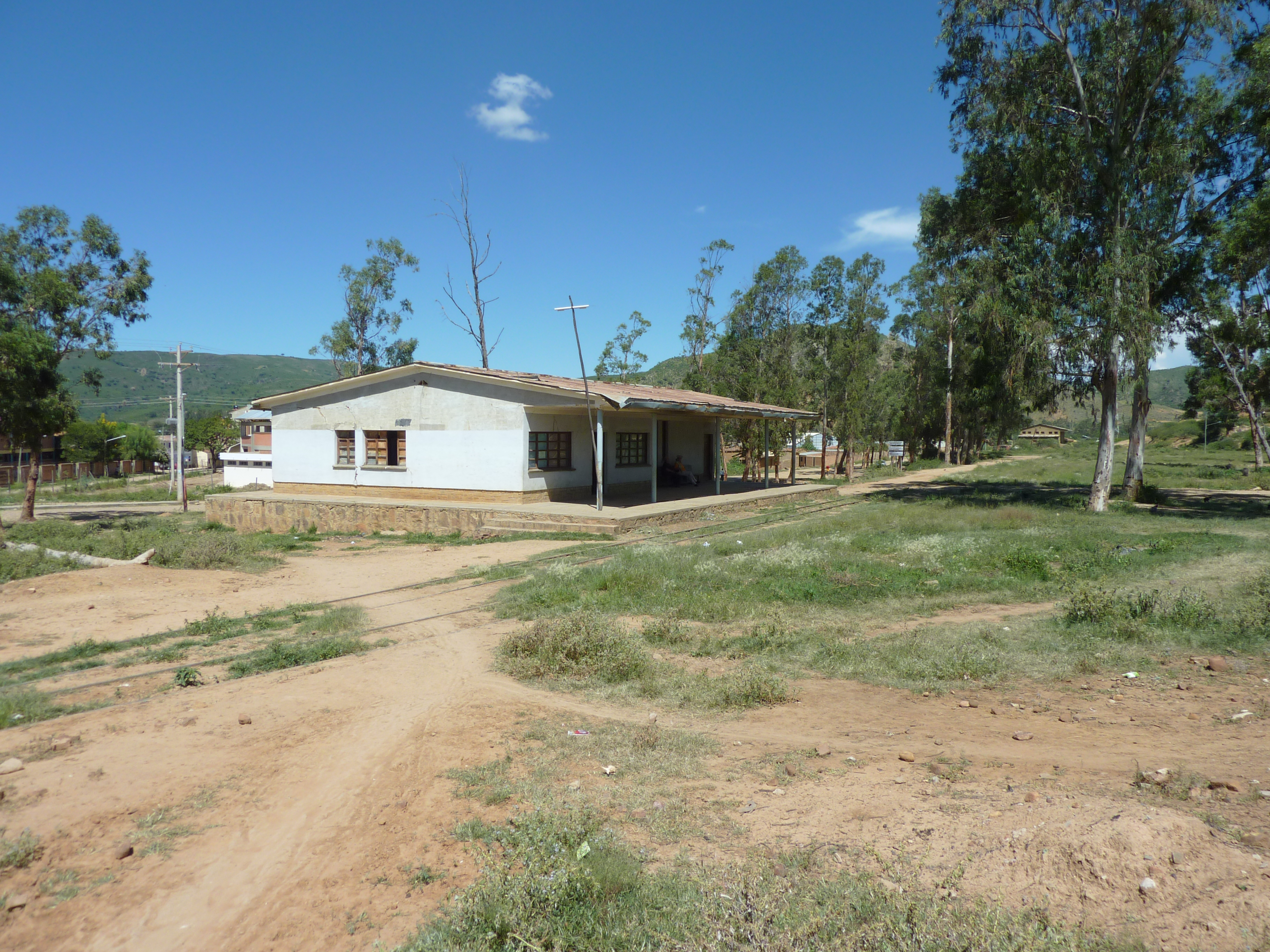
Railway station Aiquile, in Omereque

Omereque Municipality is the third municipal section of the Narciso Campero Province in the Cochabamba Department, Bolivia. Its seat is Omereque.

== Cantons ==
The municipality is divided into six cantons. They are (their seats in parentheses):

- Chari Chari Canton - (Chari Chari)
- Ele Ele Canton - (Ele Ele)
- Huanacuni Grande Canton - (Huanacuni Grande)
- Omereque Canton - (Omereque)
- Peña Colorada Canton - (Peña Colorada)
- Perereta Canton - (Perereta)
