= Pasorapa Municipality =

- Municipality
- Location within Bolivia
- Coordinates: 18°24′S 64°35′W
- Country: Bolivia
- Department: Cochabamba Department
- Province: Narciso Campero Province
- Seat: Pasorapa

Government
  - Mayor: Ervin Oretea Arimoza (2007)
  - President: Clemente Salguero Padilla (2007)

Population (2001)
  - Total: 4,659
  - Ethnicities: Quechuas
- Time zone: UTC-4 (BOT)

Pasorapa Municipality is the second municipal section of the Narciso Campero Province in the Cochabamba Department, Bolivia. Its seat is Pasorapa.

== Cantons ==
The municipality consists of only one canton, Pasorapa Canton. It is identical to the municipality.
