= Chullpani (Cochabamba) =

Mountain in Bolivia

- Location within Bolivia

Highest point
- Elevation: 2,788 m (9,147 ft)
- Coordinates: 18°04′12″S 65°33′43″W

Geography
- Location: Bolivia, Cochabamba Department
- Parent range: Andes

Chullpani (Aymara chullpa an ancient funerary building, -ni a suffix to indicate ownership, "the one with chullpa constructions") is a 2,788-metre-high (9,147 ft) mountain in the Andes of Bolivia. It is located in the Cochabamba Department, Mizque Province, Mizque Municipality.
