= Jatun Urqu (Mizque) =

Mountain in Bolivia

- Location within Bolivia

Highest point
- Elevation: 3,440 m (11,290 ft)
- Coordinates: 17°54′31″S 65°46′42″W

Geography
- Location: Bolivia, Cochabamba Department
- Parent range: Andes

Jatun Urqu (Quechua jatun big, urqu mountain, "big mountain", also spelled Jatun Orkho, Jatún Orkho) is a mountain in the Bolivian Andes which reaches a height of approximately 3,440 m (11,290 ft). It is located in the Cochabamba Department, Mizque Province, Vila Vila Municipality. Jatun Urqu lies south of Tikrasqa and southwest of Iskay Ch'utu.
