= Mizque =

Mizque Misk'i
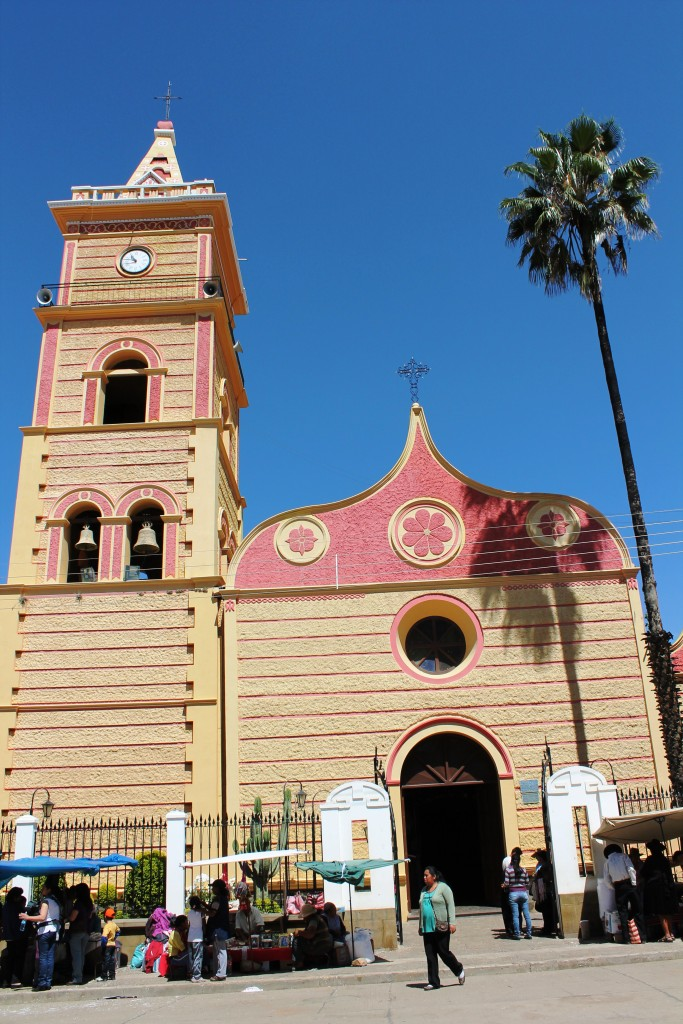
- San Sebastián Parish and Sanctuary of Ntro. Lord of Burgos de Mizque

- Location in Bolivia
- Coordinates: 17°56′S 65°19′W
- Country: Bolivia
- Department: Cochabamba Department
- Province: Mizque Province
- Municipality: Mizque Municipality
- Canton: Mizque Canton
- Elevation: 6,621 ft (2,018 m)

Population (2001)
  - Total: 26,659
- Time zone: UTC-4 (BOT)

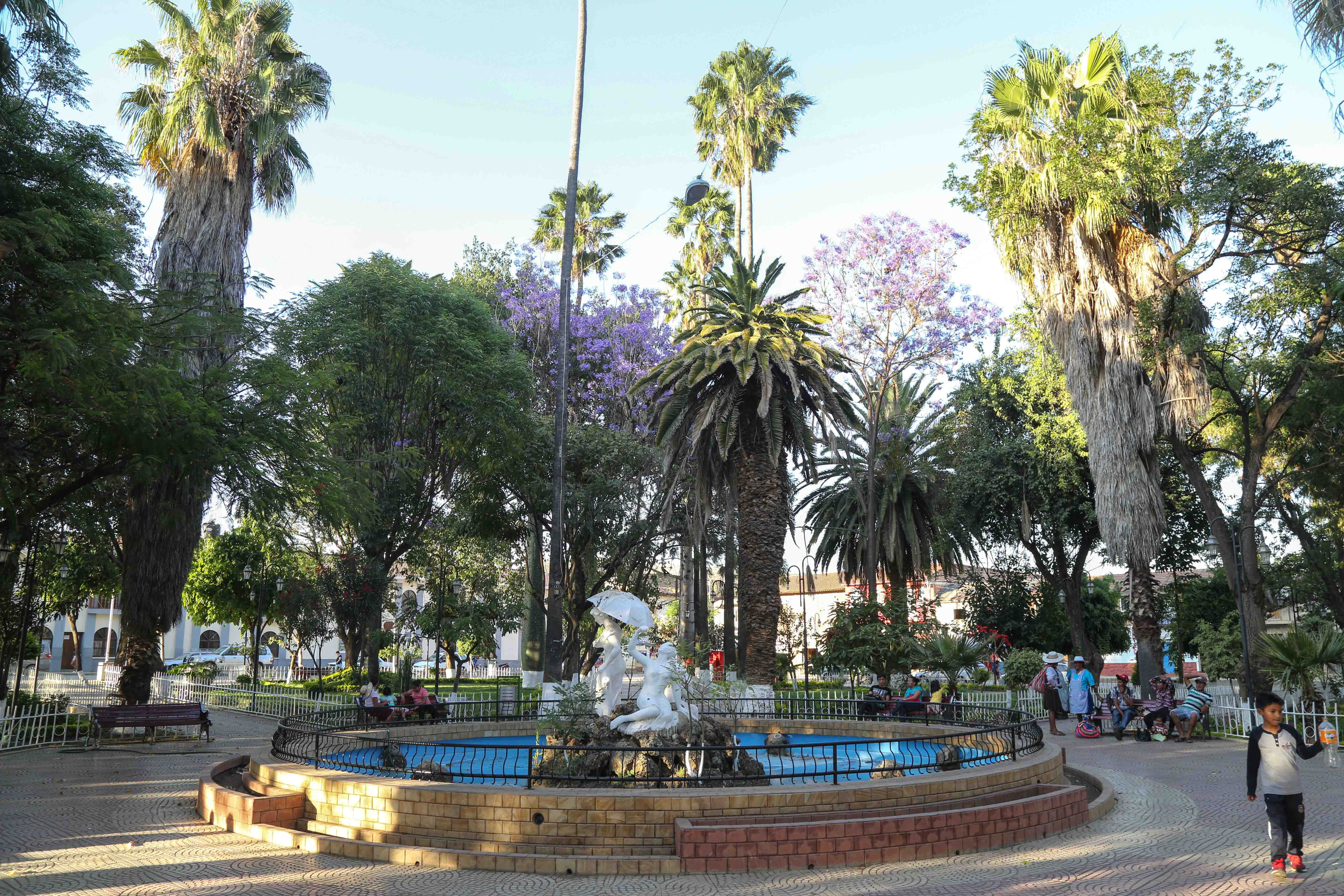
Plaza de Mizque

Mizque, Misk'i (from Quechua: misk'i, meaning "sweet") is a town in the Cochabamba Department, Bolivia. It is the capital of the Mizque Province. Mizque is located in the valley of the Mizque River, one of the main tributaries of the Río Grande.

Historically, it was located in the region of Upper Peru, and was a corregimiente dependent on Santa Cruz de la Sierra until 1783, when it became an independent town of the Intendencia de Cochabamba, in the Viceroyalty of the Río de la Plata. During the Spanish American wars of independence, Mizque sent deputies to the Congress of Tucumán, which declared Argentina's independence in 1816, and to the congress that declared the independence of Bolivia in 1825.

== Communications ==
Mizque is located on a well maintained highway which to the north-west leads through the Valle Alto to Cochabamba. In the other direction, as National Road 23, the route runs southwards to Aiquile and, beyond that, to Sucre.

The bus connection to Cochabamba operates on an almost daily basis.

Mizque is also positioned beside the Cochabamba-Aiquile railway line, but since the railway station is across the river it is hard for the inhabitants to access. There is a railcar service to Cochabamba that runs three times per week, but the journey time is approximately twice as long as that taken by the bus using the main road, and the station is not much used for passenger traffic.

== Climate ==
Climate data for Mizque, elevation 2,045 m (6,709 ft)
Month	Jan	Feb	Mar	Apr	May	Jun	Jul	Aug	Sep	Oct	Nov	Dec	Year
Mean daily maximum °C (°F)	27.3 (81.1)	27.2 (81.0)	27.3 (81.1)	27.2 (81.0)	26.7 (80.1)	26.2 (79.2)	26.0 (78.8)	27.1 (80.8)	28.0 (82.4)	29.5 (85.1)	29.5 (85.1)	28.4 (83.1)	27.5 (81.6)
Daily mean °C (°F)	20.0 (68.0)	19.9 (67.8)	19.7 (67.5)	18.6 (65.5)	16.6 (61.9)	14.9 (58.8)	14.8 (58.6)	16.5 (61.7)	18.2 (64.8)	20.2 (68.4)	21.0 (69.8)	20.5 (68.9)	18.4 (65.1)
Mean daily minimum °C (°F)	12.8 (55.0)	12.6 (54.7)	12.1 (53.8)	10.0 (50.0)	6.5 (43.7)	3.6 (38.5)	3.6 (38.5)	5.8 (42.4)	8.4 (47.1)	10.8 (51.4)	12.5 (54.5)	12.7 (54.9)	9.3 (48.7)
Average precipitation mm (inches)	117.5 (4.63)	104.7 (4.12)	67.5 (2.66)	20.6 (0.81)	2.8 (0.11)	2.4 (0.09)	1.6 (0.06)	4.2 (0.17)	9.2 (0.36)	21.5 (0.85)	50.5 (1.99)	98.0 (3.86)	500.5 (19.71)
Average precipitation days	9.9	9.1	6.4	2.1	0.7	0.5	0.4	0.8	1.3	2.5	4.8	7.6	46.1
Average relative humidity (%)	83.6	84.2	83.5	81.2	78.8	77.3	73.2	73.9	75.1	73.8	75.3	78.9	78.2
Source: Servicio Nacional de Meteorología e Hidrología de Bolivia
