= Aiquile =

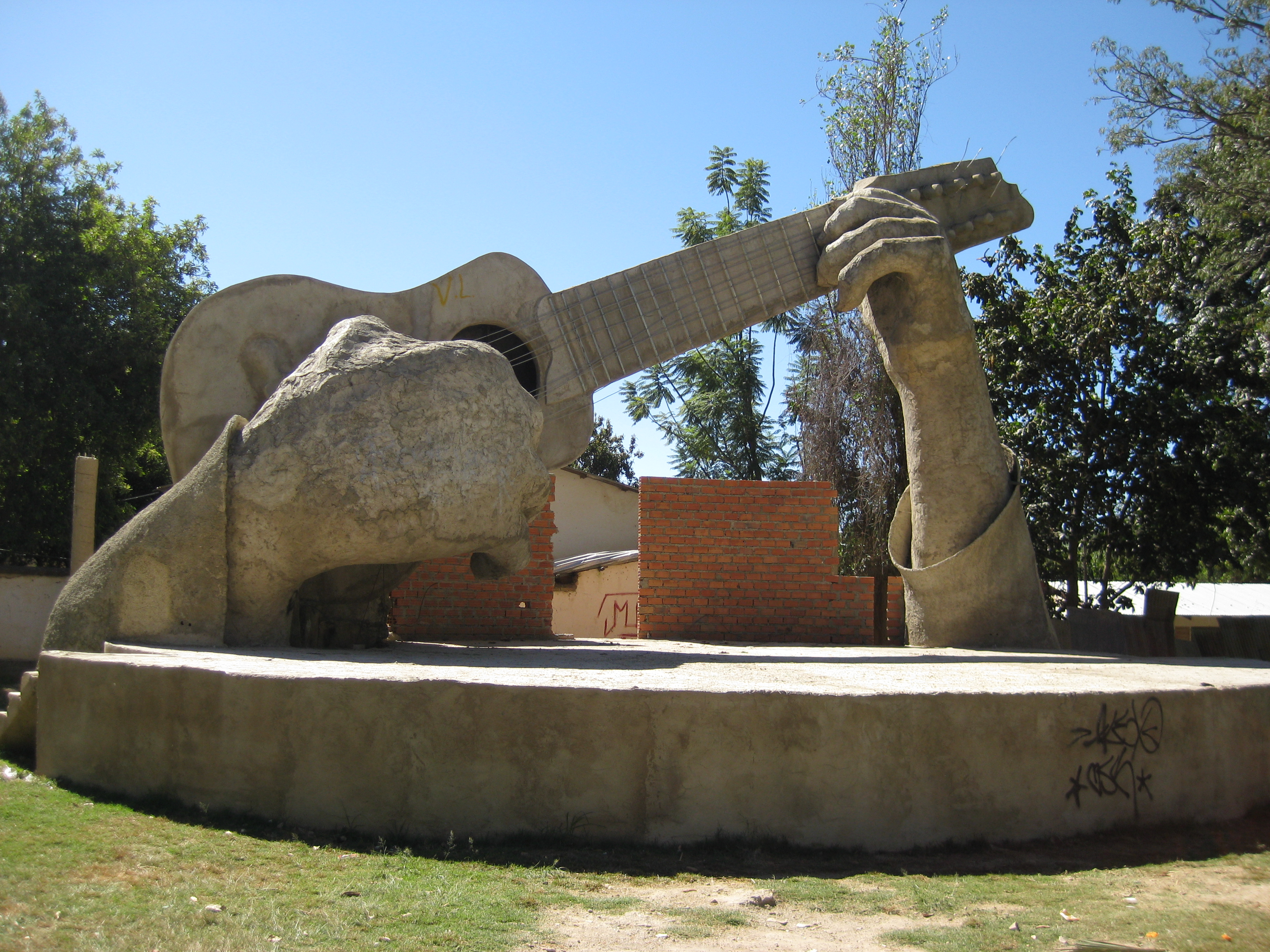
- Charango monument

- Location within Bolivia
- Coordinates: 18°10′S 65°10′W
- Country: Bolivia
- Department: Cochabamba Department
- Province: Narciso Campero Province
- Municipality: Aiquile Municipality
- Canton: Aiquile Canton

Population (census 2012)
  - Total: 7,863
- Time zone: UTC-4 (BOT)

Aiquile is a town in the Cochabamba Department, Bolivia. It is the capital of the Narciso Campero Province and Aiquile Municipality. Most of its population is Quechua, and its residents are reputed to be the best charango makers in the country.

== Climate ==
Climate data for Aiquille, elevation 2,255 m (7,398 ft)
Month	Jan	Feb	Mar	Apr	May	Jun	Jul	Aug	Sep	Oct	Nov	Dec	Year
Mean daily maximum °C (°F)	26.6 (79.9)	26.2 (79.2)	26.0 (78.8)	26.2 (79.2)	25.6 (78.1)	25.2 (77.4)	24.9 (76.8)	26.5 (79.7)	27.4 (81.3)	27.8 (82.0)	28.6 (83.5)	27.1 (80.8)	26.5 (79.7)
Daily mean °C (°F)	20.2 (68.4)	20.0 (68.0)	19.6 (67.3)	18.9 (66.0)	17.1 (62.8)	16.0 (60.8)	15.5 (59.9)	17.3 (63.1)	18.8 (65.8)	20.1 (68.2)	21.3 (70.3)	20.5 (68.9)	18.8 (65.8)
Mean daily minimum °C (°F)	13.7 (56.7)	13.8 (56.8)	13.2 (55.8)	11.7 (53.1)	8.6 (47.5)	6.8 (44.2)	6.1 (43.0)	8.1 (46.6)	10.0 (50.0)	12.3 (54.1)	13.8 (56.8)	13.9 (57.0)	11.0 (51.8)
Average precipitation mm (inches)	125.5 (4.94)	114.5 (4.51)	82.8 (3.26)	24.8 (0.98)	4.1 (0.16)	1.6 (0.06)	1.3 (0.05)	6.3 (0.25)	12.5 (0.49)	27.4 (1.08)	50.3 (1.98)	95.1 (3.74)	546.2 (21.5)
Average precipitation days	10.5	10.0	7.4	2.9	0.6	0.4	0.4	1.1	2.2	3.7	6.0	8.7	53.9
Average relative humidity (%)	71.8	73.6	74.0	69.5	63.6	60.4	60.0	61.5	63.6	63.4	66.8	70.1	66.5
Source: Servicio Nacional de Meteorología e Hidrología de Bolivia
