= Mizque Municipality =

Mizque Municipality Misk'i
- Municipality
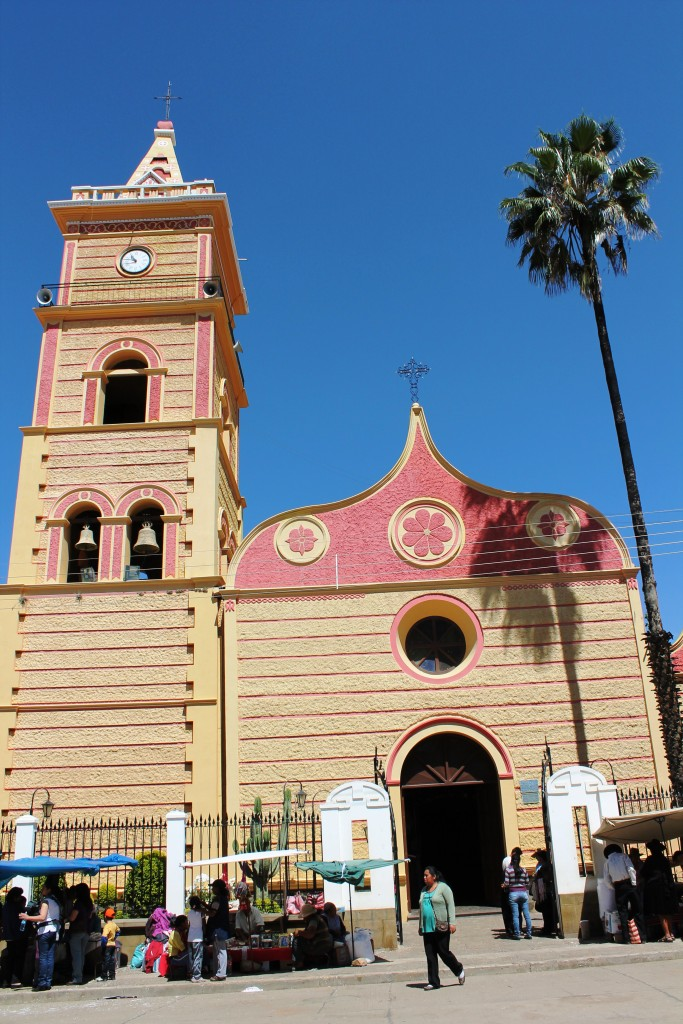
- Church of Mizque

- Location of Mizque within Bolivia
- Coordinates: 18°1′S 65°23′W
- Country: Bolivia
- Department: Cochabamba Department
- Province: Mizque Province
- Seat: Mizque

Government
  - Mayor: Jhonny Pardo Ramirez (2007)
  - President: Claudio Albarracin Calero (2007)

Population (2001)
  - Total: 26,659
- Time zone: UTC-4 (BOT)

Mizque Municipality is the first municipal section of the Mizque Province in the Cochabamba Department, Bolivia. Its seat is Mizque.

== Geography ==
Some of the highest mountains of the municipality are listed below:

- Atuq Qaqa
- Chullpa Muqu
- Chullpani
- Chhijmuri
- Jatun Urqu
- Juch'uy Chhijmuri
- Kimsa Chata
- Kimsa Pampa
- Kiska Muqu
- Kuntur Pata
- Millu Mayu
- Misa Punta
- Misk'i Apachita
- Mulli Muqu
- Puka Pampa
- Puka Q'asa
- Pukara
- Quri Pampa
- Sunkha T'ipayuq
- Tuqma
- Tuqma Urqu
- Waych'a Q'asa
- Wayrani Punta
- Yana Rumiyuq
- Yana Urqu

== Subdivision ==
Mizque Municipality is divided into six cantons.

Kanton	Inhabitants (2001)	Seat	Inhabitants (2001)
Mizque Canton	11,767	Mizque	2,677
Cauta Canton	639	Cauta	225
Molinero Canton	5,184	Molinero	146
Taboada Canton	2,551	Taboada	-
Tin Tin Canton	4,736	Tin Tin	584
Vicho Vicho Canton	1,782	Vicho Vicho	109
