= Mizque River =

Coordinates: 18.6656°S 64.3294°W

- Etymology: Quechua

Location
- Country: Bolivia
- Region: Cochabamba Department, Mizque Province, Campero Province

Physical characteristics
- Mouth: Río Grande

Basin features
- Tributaries
  - left: Uyuchama, Julpe

The Mizque River (Quechua misk'i sweet) is a river in the eastern Andes of Bolivia that forms part of the Amazon basin. It forms the border between the departments of Cochabamba in the north and Chuquisaca in the south. To the east the river enters the department of Santa Cruz where it is a tributary of Río Grande.

== See also ==
- List of rivers of Bolivia
