= Tuqma =

Mountain in Bolivia

- Location within Bolivia

Highest point
- Elevation: 2,800 m (9,200 ft)
- Coordinates: 17°48′03″S 65°22′45″W

Geography
- Location: Bolivia, Cochabamba Department
- Parent range: Andes

Tuqma (Quechua for canine tooth, also spelled Tujma) is a mountain in the Bolivian Andes which reaches a height of approximately 2,800 m (9,200 ft). It is located in the Cochabamba Department, Mizque Province, Mizque Municipality, near the border to the Carrasco Province, Pocona Municipality. Tuqma lies south of Misk'i. The Wanaku Mayu ("guanaco river") flows along its northern slope.
