= Wanq'uni (Cochabamba) =

Mountain in Bolivia

- Location within Bolivia

Highest point
- Elevation: 3,760 m (12,340 ft)
- Coordinates: 17°46′58″S 65°40′19″W

Geography
- Location: Bolivia, Cochabamba Department
- Parent range: Andes

Wanq'uni (Aymara wanq'u guinea pig, -ni a suffix, "the one with the guinea pigs", also spelled Huancuni) is a mountain in the Bolivian Andes which reaches a height of approximately 3,760 m (12,340 ft). It is located in the Cochabamba Department, Mizque Province, Alalay Municipality. It lies northeast of Inka Pirqa.
