= Narciso Campero Province =

Province of Bolivia

Provincia Narciso Campero
- Province
- Interactive map of Provincia Narciso Campero
- Coordinates: 18°15′S 65°20′W
- Country: Bolivia
- Department: Cochabamba

Area
  - Total: 5,550 km^{2} (2,140 sq mi)
- ISO 3166 code: BO.CB.CM

Narciso Campero is a province in the Cochabamba Department, Bolivia. Its capital is Aiquile. Aiquile lies on one transportation route between the cities of Cochabamba, Sucre and Santa Cruz.

== Subdivision ==
The province is divided into three municipalities which are further subdivided into 10 cantons.

Section	Municipality	Seat
1st	Aiquile Municipality	Aiquile
2nd	Pasorapa Municipality	Pasorapa
3rd	Omereque Municipality	Omereque

== 1998 earthquake ==
Campero was near the epicenter of an earthquake which struck on May 22, 1998. The shock had a moment magnitude of 6.6 and a maximum Mercalli intensity of VIII (Severe). It caused over 100 deaths and left thousands homeless. It was the largest shallow earthquake in Bolivia in over 50 years, and was felt as far away as Cochabamba and Sucre (approximately 100 km). The earthquake caused widespread damage over an area of approximately 100 km in diameter. The major towns affected were Hoyadas (100% of the buildings destroyed), Aiquile (75% of the buildings destroyed) and Totora (70% of the buildings destroyed).

== See also ==
- Chhijmuri
