= Mizque Province =

Mizque
- Province
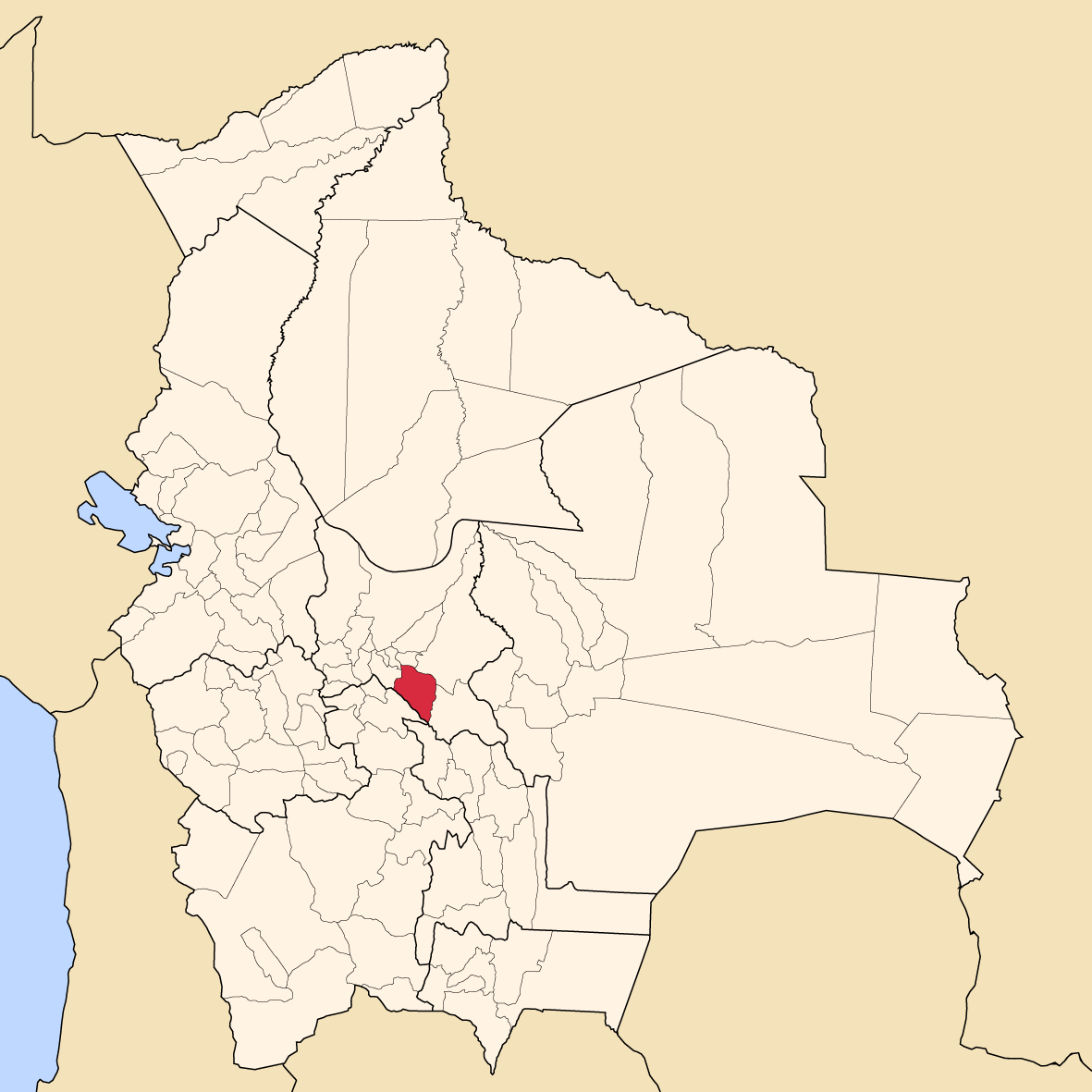
- Location of the Mizque Province within Bolivia

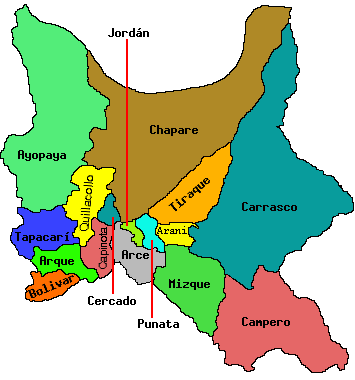
- Provinces of the Cochabamba Department
- Coordinates: 18°00′00″S 66°00′0″W
- Country: Bolivia
- Department: Cochabamba
- Capital: Mizque

Area
  - Total: 1,050 sq mi (2,730 km^{2})

Population (2001)
  - Total: 36,181
  - Density: 34/sq mi (13.3/km^{2})
  - Ethnicities: Quechua
- Time zone: UTC-4 (BOT)

Mizque (from Quechua: misk'i, meaning "sweet") is a province in the Cochabamba Department, Bolivia. Its capital is Mizque.

The province, in 1992, had a population of 27,959 inhabitants, mostly indigenous citizens of Quechuan descent. In 2001, the population increased to 36,181 inhabitants and it was estimated at 41,062 in 2005.

== Geography ==
Mizque Province is home to a great diversity of ecoregions because it contains a wide variety of topographic features with heights ranging between 2,000 and 3,600 m. The province belongs to the Julpe-Mizque basin with an area of 3,845 km^{2}.

The main rivers are:

- Mizque River, 75 km
- Julpe River, 60 km
- Uyuchama River, 50 km
- Tuqma River, 45 km
- Kari Kari River, 42 km
- Vicho Vicho River, 32 km

Although there is a large amount of superficial and sub-superficial water within the province, the zone is suffering from drought due to the lack of irrigation systems.

Some of the highest mountains of the province are listed below:

- Apachita
- Chawpi Ch'utu
- Chullpa Mayu
- Chullpa Q'asa
- Chullpani
- Chuqi Chuqi
- Inka P'iqi
- Inka Pirqa
- Iskay Ch'utu
- Jatun Ch'utu
- Jatun Pukara
- Jatun Urqu
- Kachi Q'asa
- Kimsa Pampa
- Kuntur Pata
- Kuntur Punta
- Misa Punta
- Mulli Q'asa
- Puka Qallpa
- Puka Qawiña
- Puka Q'asa
- Pukara
- Putu Phutunqu
- Rirpu
- Siwinqani
- Tampu Q'asa
- Tikrasqa
- Tuqma
- Tuqma Urqu
- Wanq'uni
- Warmi Wañusqa
- Wisk'acha Punta
- Yana Qaqa
- Yana Urqu
- Yura Q'asa

== Climate ==
The climate is dry. There are a few irregular rainfalls and long periods of drought. The medium annual temperature varies between 16 and 18 °C. During the rainy season ("summer"), corresponding to the months from December to March, the province receives 87% of the annual precipitation, in December and January alone 57%, often occurring as hailstorms. During the dry season ("winter") the temperature goes down radically and snowfalls occur. The annual precipitation is between 300 and 700 mm, reaching 507 mm annually on an average.

== Flora ==
The semiarid and arid regions are covered with plants which are tolerant towards dry conditions. 75% of the total area of Mizque Province is cultivated.

== Fauna ==
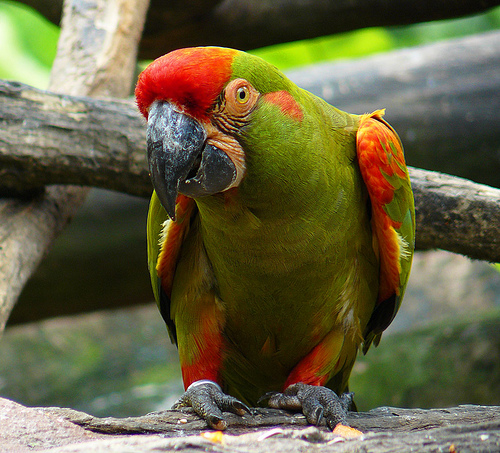
Red-fronted macaw (Ara rubrogenys)

The red-fronted macaws (Ara rubrogenys), endemic to a small mountainous area of Bolivia, can be observed in Mizque. This species is considered to be endangered due to intense agriculture activity which has reduced its habitat. The problem is that the peasants of some zones look upon them as a plague because they raid the maize in the fields. There is a chance that they might be regarded as one of the tourist attractions of the region.

== Subdivision ==
The province is divided into three municipalities which are further subdivided into ten cantons.

| Section | Municipality | Inhabitants | Seat | Inhabitants | Cantons |
|---|---|---|---|---|---|
| 1st | Mizque | 26,659 | Mizque | 2.677 | Cauta, Mizque, Molinero, Taboada, Tin Tin, Vicho Vicho |
| 2nd | Vila Vila | 4,591 | Vila Vila | 426 | Siquimira, Vila Vila |
| 3rd | Alalay | 4.931 | Alalay | 638 | Alalay, Ayapampa |

== The people ==
The majority of the population of the Mizque Province lives in the rural area in communities far apart from each other. The lack of good roads makes trade and providing services difficult. The land in some areas is quite dry and not appropriate for farming. That may be some of the reasons why the Human Development Index in the municipalities of Mizque is among the lowest in Bolivia (0.365, 0.400 and 0.460), placing them in the positions 284 (Mizque), 305 (Vila Vila) and 298 (Alalay) out of 314 municipalities.

The conditions of life are especially critical in the puna and remote communities. The level of income of a peasant family in the high zones or in the dryland is estimated at 200 - 250 US-$ per year.

Some data:

| Mizque Province | | | |
|---|---|---|---|
| Municipality | Mizque | Vila Vila | Alalay |
| Nacional ranking (out of 314) | 284 | 305 | 298 |
| Human Development Index (2001) | 0.430 | 0.365 | 0.400 |
| Life Expectancy Index | 0.453 | 0.394 | 0.540 |
| Education Index | 0.509 | 0.454 | 0.440 |
| Life expectancy (years) | 52.2 | 48.7 | 57.4 |
| Literacy of adults (% of 15 years old and more) | 61.4 | 55.9 | 66.2 |
| Average years of schooling | 3.1 | 2.1 | 2.8 |
| Population census 2001 | 26,659 | 4,591 | 4,931 |
| Percentage of rural population | 90.0% | 100.0% | 100.0% |

There are 182 rural communities within the territory of the province situated in heights between 2,000 m in the template valleys and 3,600 m in the puna.

== Language ==
The predominant language is Quechua, spoken by 32,212 inhabitants and about 11,482 inhabitants are bilingual. They can speak Spanish as well. The following table shows the number of those belonging to the recognized group of speakers.

| Language | Mizque Municipality | Vila Vila Municipality | Alalay Municipality |
|---|---|---|---|
| Quechua | 24.212 | 4.229 | 4.529 |
| Aymara | 172 | 11 | 12 |
| Guaraní | 8 | 5 | 9 |
| Another native | 10 | 2 | 1 |
| Spanish | 8.378 | 789 | 1.002 |
| Foreign | 41 | 6 | 4 |
| Only native | 16.499 | 3.493 | 3.549 |
| Native and Spanish | 7.753 | 742 | 987 |
| Only Spanish | 626 | 47 | 15 |

== Economy ==
The economic activity is concentrated on agriculture and animal husbandry and to a minor extent on mining and crafts. The most important sectors in agriculture are the cultivation of potatoes, maize, wheat, peanuts, barley and onions.

== Festivals and Fairs ==
- 2nd week in May: Fruit fair in Mizque, 1 day
- July 16: Our Lady of Mount Carmel in Alalay, 3 days
- September 8–14: Our Lord of Burgos (Señor de Burgos) in Mizque, 7 days
- September 23–25: Virgen Mestiza de Shikimira in Vila Vila, 3 days
