= Inka Pirqa (Bolivia) =

Mountain in Bolivia

- Location within Bolivia

Highest point
- Elevation: 3,680 m (12,070 ft)
- Coordinates: 17°47′25″S 65°42′26″W

Geography
- Location: Bolivia, Cochabamba Department
- Parent range: Andes

Jatun Urqu (Quechua Inka Inca, pirqa wall, "Inca wall", also spelled Inca Perkha) is a mountain in the Bolivian Andes which reaches a height of approximately 3,680 m (12,070 ft). It is located in the Cochabamba Department, Mizque Province, Alalay Municipality. It lies northeast of Jatun Urqu.
