= Tikrasqa (Mizque) =

Mountain

- Location within Bolivia

Highest point
- Elevation: 3,718 m (12,198 ft)
- Coordinates: 17°52′17″S 65°47′03″W

Geography
- Location: Bolivia, Cochabamba Department
- Parent range: Andes

Tikrasqa (Quechua tikray to turn upside down, -sqa a suffix, "turned upside down", also spelled Tecrasca) is a 3,718-metre-high (12,198 ft) mountain in the Bolivian Andes. It is located in the Cochabamba Department, Mizque Province, Vila Vila Municipality.

The Pukara Mayu which downstream is named Wila Wila originates north of the mountain. It flows to the southeast.
