= Bolivian boliviano =

Currency of Bolivia

boliviano (Spanish)
- 10 centavos to 5 bolivianos

ISO 4217
- Code: BOB (numeric: 068)
- Subunit: 0.01

Units of account
- Symbol: Bs
- Subunit
- 1/100: centavo
- Symbol
- centavo: c.

Denominations
- Banknotes: Bs10, 20, 50, 100, 200
- Coins: c.10, 20, 50; Bs1, 2, 5

Demographics
- Date of introduction: 1 January 1987
- Replaced: Bolivian peso
- User(s): Bolivia

Issuance
- Central bank: Banco Central de Bolivia
- Website: www.bcb.gob.bo

Valuation
- Inflation: 13.9%
- Source: The World Factbook, April 2025.

The boliviano ([boliˈβjano]; sign: Bs ISO 4217 code: BOB) is the currency of Bolivia. It is divided into 100 cents or centavos in Spanish. Boliviano was also the name of the currency of Bolivia between 1864 and 1963. From April 2018, the manager of the Central Bank of Bolivia, Pablo Ramos, announced the introduction of the new family of banknotes of the Plurinational State of Bolivia, started with the 10 Bs note, and then gradually arrived to introduce the 200 Bs note, presented in April 2019. The new family of banknotes of the Plurinational State received several awards such as "the best banknotes in Latin America", was highlighted by its security measures, its aesthetics and its inclusion of prominent figures in Bolivian history, being among those who awarded the "Latin American High Security Printing Press Conference".

== History ==
Currencies in use before the current second boliviano include:

- The Spanish real from the 16th to 19th centuries, with 8 reales equal to 1 peso and 16 reales equal to 1 escudo.
- The Bolivian sol from 1827 to 1864, replacing the Spanish real at par. 16 soles were equal to 1 Bolivian escudo, and 8 soles were equal to 1 boliviano.
- The first boliviano from 1864 to 1963, worth eight soles and divided into 100 centécimos (later centavos). The name bolivar was used for an amount of ten bolivianos.
- The peso boliviano (code BOP), from 1963 to 1986, worth 1,000 first bolivianos.

The second boliviano was introduced in 1987 at a rate of 1 boliviano = 1,000,000 pesos bolivianos.

== Second boliviano ==
Following many years of rampant inflation, the bolivian peso was replaced in 1987 by a new boliviano at a rate of one million to one (when 1 U.S. dollar was worth 1.8/1.9 million pesos). At that time, 1 new boliviano was roughly equivalent to 1/2 U.S. dollar.

=== Coins ===
In 1988, stainless-steel 2, 5, 10, 20 and 50 centavos and 1 boliviano (dated 1987) coins were introduced, followed by stainless-steel 2 bolivianos in 1991. Copper-plated steel 10 centavos were introduced in 1997 and bi-metallic 5 bolivianos in 2001. The 2 and 5 centavo coins are no longer in circulation. The 2 boliviano coin has been minted in two sizes, both of which remain legal tender. The smaller 2 boliviano coin is almost the same as the 1 boliviano coin, leading to potential confusion, although the 2 boliviano coins are undecagonal whilst the 1 boliviano coins are round. All the coins in Bolivia have the value with the inscription "La union es la Fuerza" ("Union is strength" in Spanish) on the obverse. Older coins feature and the coat of arms of Bolivia with the inscription "Republica de Bolivia" (Republic of Bolivia) on the reverse, while newer ones feature the coat of arms with the inscription "Estado Plurinacional de Bolivia" (Plurinational state of Bolivia).

Coins of the Boliviano (older series)
Obverse	Reverse	Value	Technical parameters				Description		Date of issue
Obverse	Reverse	Value	Diameter	Mass	Composition	Edge	Obverse	Reverse	Date of issue
		2 centavos	14 mm	1 g	Stainless steel	Plain	"LA UNIÓN ES LA FUERZA"; "2 CENTAVOS"; Date of issue	"REPUBLICA DE BOLIVIA" (REPUBLIC OF BOLIVIA); Coat of arms of Bolivia	1987
		5 centavos	17 mm	1.5 g	Stainless steel	Plain	"LA UNIÓN ES LA FUERZA"; "5 CENTAVOS"; Date of issue	"REPUBLICA DE BOLIVIA" (REPUBLIC OF BOLIVIA); Coat of arms of Bolivia	1987
		10 centavos	19 mm	2.2 g	Stainless steel	Plain	"LA UNIÓN ES LA FUERZA"; "10 CENTAVOS"; Date of issue	"REPUBLICA DE BOLIVIA" (REPUBLIC OF BOLIVIA); Coat of arms of Bolivia	1987–1997
		10 centavos	19 mm	2.23 g	Copper plated steel	Plain	"LA UNIÓN ES LA FUERZA"; "10 CENTAVOS"; Date of issue	"REPUBLICA DE BOLIVIA" (REPUBLIC OF BOLIVIA); Coat of arms of Bolivia	1997
		10 centavos	19 mm	1.85 g	Copper plated steel	Plain	"LA UNIÓN ES LA FUERZA"; "10 CENTAVOS"; Date of issue	"REPUBLICA DE BOLIVIA" (REPUBLIC OF BOLIVIA); Coat of arms of Bolivia	2001-2008
		20 centavos	22 mm	3.66 g	Stainless steel	Plain	"LA UNIÓN ES LA FUERZA"; "20 CENTAVOS"; Date of issue	"REPUBLICA DE BOLIVIA" (REPUBLIC OF BOLIVIA); Coat of arms of Bolivia	1987-2008
		50 centavos	24 mm	3.8 g	Stainless steel	Plain	"LA UNIÓN ES LA FUERZA"; "50 CENTAVOS"; Date of issue	"REPUBLICA DE BOLIVIA" (REPUBLIC OF BOLIVIA); Coat of arms of Bolivia	1987-2008
		1 boliviano	27 mm	5 g	Stainless steel	Plain	"LA UNIÓN ES LA FUERZA"; "1 BOLIVIANO"; Date of issue	"REPUBLICA DE BOLIVIA" (REPUBLIC OF BOLIVIA); Coat of arms of Bolivia	1987-2008
		2 bolivianos	27 mm	6.25 g	Stainless steel	Plain	"LA UNIÓN ES LA FUERZA"; "2 BOLIVIANOS"; Date of issue	"REPUBLICA DE BOLIVIA" (REPUBLIC OF BOLIVIA); Coat of arms of Bolivia	1991
		2 bolivianos	29 mm	6.4 g	Stainless steel	Plain	"LA UNIÓN ES LA FUERZA"; "2 BOLIVIANOS"; Date of issue	"REPUBLICA DE BOLIVIA" (REPUBLIC OF BOLIVIA); Coat of arms of Bolivia	1995-2008
		5 bolivianos	23 mm	5 g	Bi-metallic: bronze plated steel center with a stainless steel ring	Reeded	"LA UNIÓN ES LA FUERZA"; "5 BOLIVIANOS"; Date of issue	"REPUBLICA DE BOLIVIA" (REPUBLIC OF BOLIVIA); Coat of arms of Bolivia	2001–2004

Coins of the Boliviano (current series)
Obverse	Reverse	Value	Technical parameters				Description		Date of issue
Obverse	Reverse	Value	Diameter	Mass	Composition	Edge	Obverse	Reverse	Date of issue
		10 centavos	19 mm	2.2 g	Steel	Plain	"LA UNIÓN ES LA FUERZA"; "10 CENTAVOS"; Date of issue	"ESTADO PLURINACIONAL DE BOLIVIA" (PLURINATIONAL STATE OF BOLIVIA); Coat of arms of Bolivia	2017
		20 centavos	22 mm	3.25 g	Nickel plated steel	Plain	"LA UNIÓN ES LA FUERZA"; "20 CENTAVOS"; Date of issue	"ESTADO PLURINACIONAL DE BOLIVIA" (PLURINATIONAL STATE OF BOLIVIA); Coat of arms of Bolivia	2010–2016
		50 centavos	24 mm	3.75 g	Stainless steel	Plain	"LA UNIÓN ES LA FUERZA"; "50 CENTAVOS"; Date of issue	"ESTADO PLURINACIONAL DE BOLIVIA" (PLURINATIONAL STATE OF BOLIVIA); Coat of arms of Bolivia	2010–2012
		1 boliviano	27 mm	5 g	Stainless steel	Plain	"LA UNIÓN ES LA FUERZA"; "1 BOLIVIANO"; Date of issue	"ESTADO PLURINACIONAL DE BOLIVIA" (PLURINATIONAL STATE OF BOLIVIA); Coat of arms of Bolivia	2010–2017
		2 bolivianos	29 mm	7 g	Stainless steel	Plain	"LA UNIÓN ES LA FUERZA"; "2 BOLIVIANOS"; Date of issue	"ESTADO PLURINACIONAL DE BOLIVIA" (PLURINATIONAL STATE OF BOLIVIA); Coat of arms of Bolivia	2010–2017
		5 bolivianos	23 mm	5 g	Bi-metallic coin consisting of a Bronze-plated steel center plug with a Stainless steel outer ring	Reeded	"LA UNIÓN ES LA FUERZA"; "5 BOLIVIANOS"; Date of issue	"ESTADO PLURINACIONAL DE BOLIVIA" (PLURINATIONAL STATE OF BOLIVIA); Coat of arms of Bolivia	2017

=== Banknotes ===
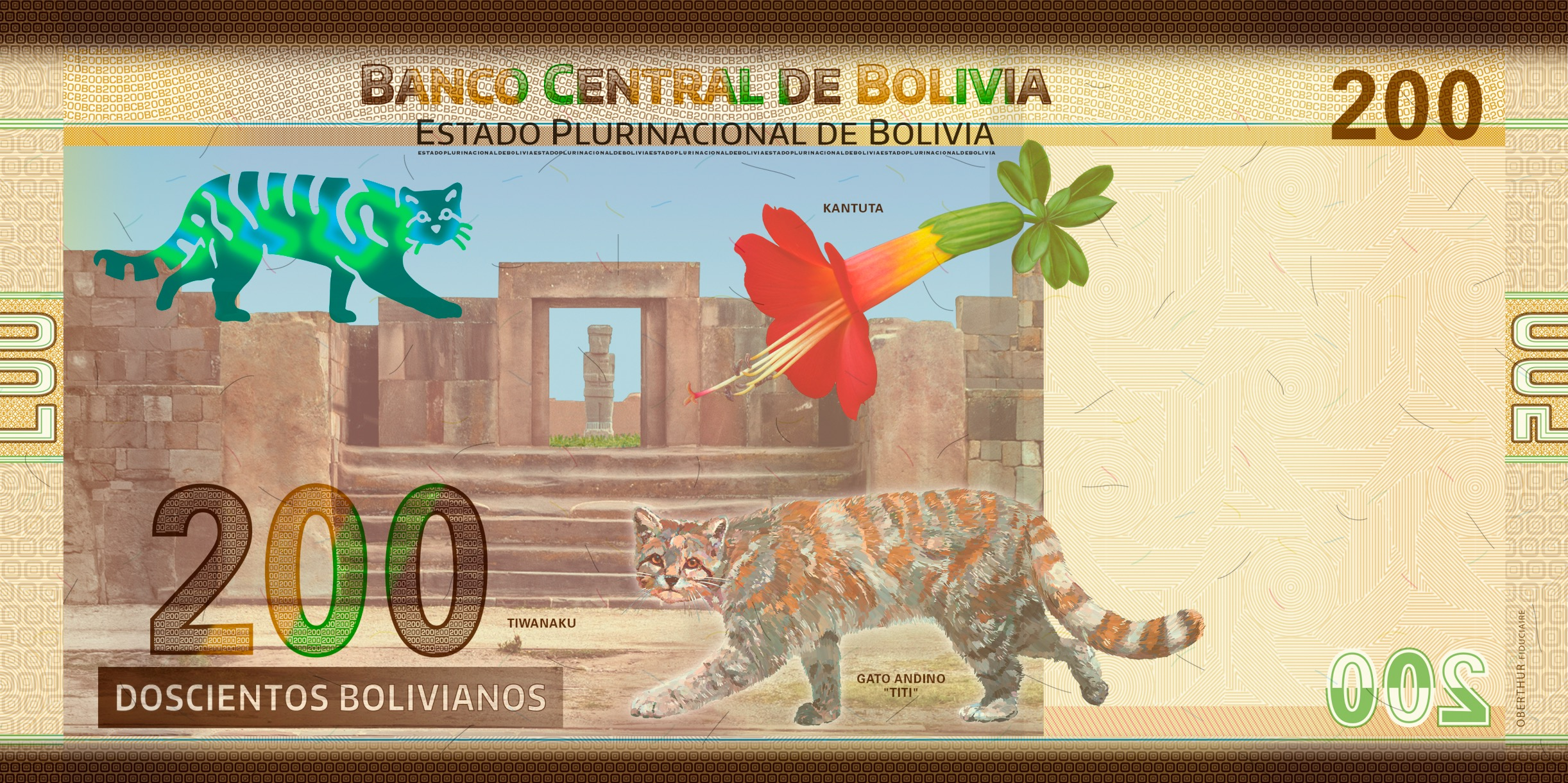
New family banknotes of Plurinational State of Bolivia

In 1987, last peso boliviano banknotes and cheques de gerência were overprinted with denominations in centavos and bolivianos to produce provisional issues of 1, 5, 10 and 50 centavos, and 1, 5 and 10 bolivianos. Regular issues followed the same year in denominations of 2, 5, 10, 20, 50, 100 and 200 bolivianos. The 2 boliviano note was replaced by a coin in 1991, with the same happening to the 5 boliviano in 2001, although the Bolivian central bank still listed the 5 boliviano note as "in circulation" until 2013, when the 2 and 5 Bolivianos bills were officially out of circulation.

The Bolivianos bills depict prominent historical figures:

- The 10 Bolivianos bill has in the obverse to the painter Cecilio Guzman and reverse an image of city of Cochabamba.
- The 20 Boliviano bill has in the obverse to the lawyer Pantaleon Dalence and in the reverse, an image of The Golden Colonial House of Tarija. The 50 Boliviano bill has in the obverse to the painter Melchor Perez and when reversed the Tower of Church of the Society of Jesus in the city of Potosi can be seen.
- The 100 Boliviano bill has in the obverse of the great historian Gabriel Rene Moreno and the reverse one image of the Mayor Real and Papal University of Saint Francisco Xavier of Chuquisaca in the capital, the city of Sucre.
- The 200 Boliviano bill has to the obverse to the writer and former president of Bolivia, Franz Tamayo and in the reverse an image of ruins of the Pre-Inca empire of Tihuanaco in the shores of Lake Titicaca in the state or department of La Paz.

In 2018, the Central Bank of Bolivia (Banco Central de Bolivia) unveiled a new family of banknotes, and will be issued by order of denomination. The notes are the first to bear the formal name of Bolivia "Estado Plurinacional de Bolivia" (Plurinational State of Bolivia), to reflect the multiculturalism of the country and all of its citizens.

Banknotes of the Boliviano (1987–2016 series)
Image	Value	Main Color	Obverse	Reverse	Watermark
	2 bolivianos	Gray	Antonio Vaca Diez	Pando refuge	Simón Bolívar
	5 bolivianos	Green	Adela Zamudio	Virgen del Socavon church	Simón Bolívar
	10 bolivianos	Blue	Cecilio Guzman de Rojas	"Heroinas de la Coronilla" monument in Cochabamba	Simón Bolívar
	20 bolivianos	Orange	Pantaleon Dalence	Casa Dorada in Tarija	Simón Bolívar
	50 bolivianos	Purple	Melchor Pérez de Holguin	Torre de la Compañia	Simón Bolívar
	100 bolivianos	Red	Gabriel René Moreno	San Francisco Xavier de Chuquisaca University in Sucre	Simón Bolívar
	200 bolivianos	Brown	Franz Tamayo	Tiahuanaco	Simón Bolívar

Banknotes of the Boliviano (2018 – 2019 series)
Image	Value	Main Color	Obverse	Reverse	Watermark
	10 bolivianos	Blue	José Santos Vargas "El Tambor Vargas", Apiaguaiki Tumpa, Eustaquio Méndez "El Moto Méndez". Umajalanta Cavern (Torotoro National Park)	Landscape of Isla del Pescado in Salar de Uyuni salt flat. Giant hummingbird and Puya raimondii	José Santos Vargas, drum and electrotype 10
	20 bolivianos	Orange	Genoveva Ríos, Tomás Katari and Pedro Ignacio Muiba. El Fuerte de Samaipata	Black caiman and Toborochi (Ceiba speciosa)	Genoveva Ríos and electrotype 20
	50 bolivianos	Purple	José Manuel Baca "Cañoto", Bruno Racua, Pablo Zárate also known as Willka. Incallajta Fortress	Nevado Sajama, Andean flamingo and Quinoa	José Manuel Baca "Cañoto", guitar and electrotype 50
	100 bolivianos	Red	Juana Azurduy de Padilla, Alejo Calatayud, Antonio José de Sucre. National Mint of Bolivia	Arco Iris Waterfall, Heliconia rostrata, Hyacinth Macaw	
	200 bolivianos	Brown	Túpac Katari, Bartolina Sisa, Simón Bolivar. House of Freedom	Tiwanaku (specifically Kalasasaya and the Ponce Monolith), Cantua buxifolia, Andean Mountain Cat	

From 28 February to 2 March 2026, the Central Bank of Bolivia suspended the legal tender status of 10, 20 and 50-boliviano notes of the 2018 series with serial numbers ending with B, in response to the 2026 Bolivian Air Force Lockheed C-130 crash: the Central Bank published serial numbers of notes that were in the crash, and declared the affected notes worthless:

Denomination	Serial numbers (all ending in B)
10 bolivianos	77100001–77550000; 78000001–78450000; 78900001–96350000; 96350001–96800000; 96800001–97250000; 98150001–98600000; 104900001–105800000; 106700001–107150000; 107600001–108500000; 109400001–109850000
20 bolivianos	87280145–91646549; 96650001–97100000; 99800001–100700000; 109250001–109700000; 110600001–111500000; 111950001–113300000; 114200001–115550000; 118700001–119600000; 120500001–120950000
50 bolivianos	67250001–67700000; 69050001–71300000; 76310012–85139995; 86400001–86850000; 90900001–91350000; 91800001–92250000

== Exchange rates ==
In a fixed exchange rate regime system, the Central Bank of Bolivia undertakes to buy and sell foreign currency at the price it previously set of Bs 6.86 for the purchase and Bs 6.96 for the sale for US$1, respectively, from November 2011 to the present, which is more than eleven continuous years. The consequences of this system are crucial, although in practice they are not understood in their real dimension of its effects in the short and long term on the country's economy. Since 2023 in Bolivia there has been a shortage of United States dollars, so the "parallel" dollar began to settle in streets and some exchange houses, reaching an exchange rate of Bs 15 for sale for US$1 although the Central Bank of Bolivia enabled the option of carry out the sale of dollars in their offices at the official price.

Since the emergence of a parallel exchange market, several websites have begun tracking informal U.S. dollar prices in Bolivia using peer-to-peer (P2P) exchange data from platforms such as Binance. These sources provide reference exchange rates based on market transactions rather than official figures.

As of June 29, 2026, the official exchange rate for the U.S. dollar has been eliminated. From this date forward, a flexible exchange rate will be implemented, pegged to the parallel market rate. This new exchange rate will begin with a 40% devaluation of the Bolivian boliviano (BOB), setting the rate at BOB 9.73.

Current BOB exchange rates
From Google Finance:	AUD CAD CHF CNY EUR GBP HKD JPY USD RUB BRL ARS
From Yahoo! Finance:	AUD CAD CHF CNY EUR GBP HKD JPY USD RUB BRL ARS
From XE.com:	AUD CAD CHF CNY EUR GBP HKD JPY USD RUB BRL ARS
From OANDA:	AUD CAD CHF CNY EUR GBP HKD JPY USD RUB BRL ARS

== Manufacture and production ==
As of 2013 boliviano coins and banknotes are still being produced abroad, in countries such as the United Kingdom, France, and Chile, even though Bolivia has been politically independent since 1825.

Though Bolivia was one of the main mints of the colonial era (casa de la moneda, Potosí) the coining and printing of currency stopped due to lack of political interest and on the idea that foreign made coins and banknotes could be acquired at a lower price than the Bolivian-made coins and banknotes.

== U.S. dollar-related currency (MVDOL) ==
MVDOL (ISO 4217 code BOV) is a unit of currency (account). It has a value, inflation-adjusted between the Bolivian boliviano and the U.S. dollar. It is used in financial instruments due to its stable value.

The name wikt:MVDOL is derived from moneda nacional con mantenimiento de valor al dólar estadounidense ([Bolivian] national currency with value maintained to the U.S. dollar).

== See also ==
- Economy of Bolivia
- Central Bank of Bolivia
