= Boliviano (1864–1963) =

Currency of Bolivia from 1864 to 1963

Bolivian boliviano
boliviano (Spanish)
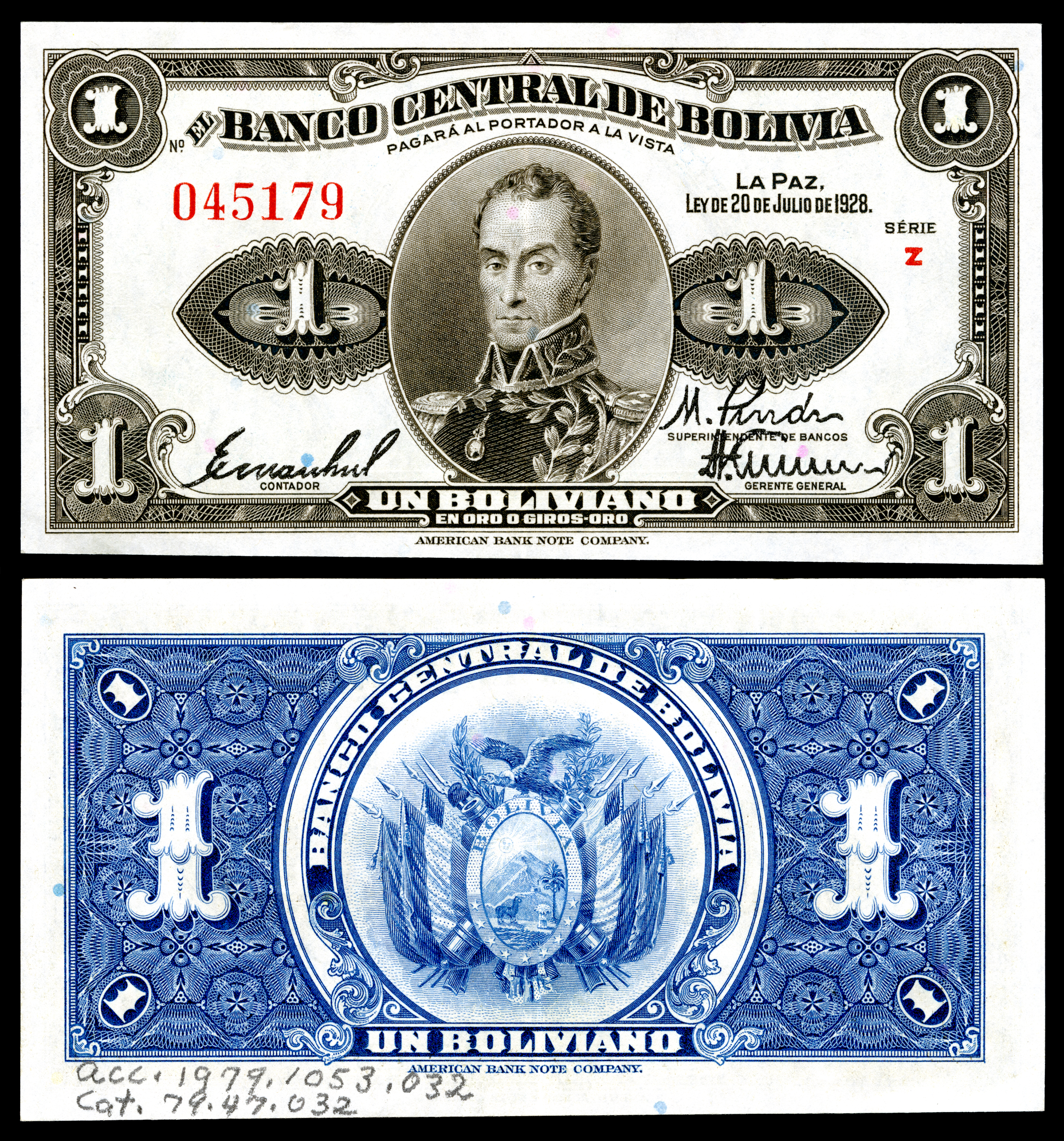
- 1-boliviano banknote (1928)

Denominations
- Superunit
- 10: bolívar
- Subunit
- 1/100: centavo centécimo (before 1870)

Demographics
- Date of introduction: 1864
- Replaced: Bolivian sol
- Date of withdrawal: 1963
- Replaced by: Bolivian peso
- User(s): Bolivia

Issuance
- Central bank: Banco Central de Bolivia

Valuation
- Pegged with: French franc (1864–1908); Sterling (1908–1940); United States dollar (1940–1963)
- Value: 1000 bolivianos = 1 peso
- This infobox shows the latest status before this currency was rendered obsolete.

The first boliviano was the currency of Bolivia from 1864 to 1963. Due to rising inflation, it was replaced with the peso boliviano at an exchange rate of 1000 bolivianos to 1 peso. The peso was later replaced by the second Bolivian boliviano.

== History ==
The first boliviano was introduced in 1864. It was equivalent to eight soles or half a scudo in the former currency. Initially, it was subdivided into 100 centécimos but this was altered to centavos in 1870. The name bolivar was used for an amount of ten bolivianos.

The boliviano was initially pegged at a rate of 1 boliviano = 5 French francs. On December 31, 1908, the currency was put on a new gold standard, with 12 1/2 bolivianos = 1 pound sterling (or 1s. 7.2d. sterling per boliviano). A series of devaluations relative to the pound followed:

Pegs of the boliviano to sterling (bolivianos per pound)
Date introduced	Peg	Inverse rate (sterling per boliviano)
July 11, 1928	13.5	1s. 5 7/8d.
May 1932	17	1s. 2 2/17d.
February 20, 1933	20	1s. (shilling)
April 1, 1936	50	4 4/5d.
June 14, 1936	80	3d. (threepence)
July 29, 1937	120	2d. (twopence)
June 20, 1938	141	approx. 1.7d.
September 5, 1939	160	1 1/2d.

In 1940, multiple exchange rates to the U.S. dollar were established (40 and 55 bolivianos = 1 dollar). However, the boliviano continued to fall in value. In 1963, it was replaced by the peso boliviano (ISO 4217: BOP) at a rate of one thousand to one.

=== Coins ===
In 1864, copper 1 and 2 centesimos, and silver 1/20, 1/10, 1/5 and 1 boliviano were introduced. In 1870, silver 5, 10 and 20 centavos were introduced, followed by silver 50 centavos in 1873 and copper 1 and 2 centavos in 1878. In 1883, cupro-nickel 5 and 10 centavos were introduced. Because these were similar in size to the silver 10 and 20 centavo coins, some were officially punched with a centre hole. Larger 5 and 10 centavo coins were issued from 1892. The 50 centavos was last struck in 1879, whilst the 1 and 2 centavos were last struck in 1883.

The last 5 centavos were struck in 1935, whilst, in 1937, cupro-nickel 50 centavos were introduced, followed in 1942 by issues of zinc 10 and 20 centavos and bronze 50 centavos. These were the last issues below 1 boliviano. In 1951, bronze 1, 5 and 10 bolivianos were issued.

=== Banknotes ===
In 1873, the first boliviano banknotes were issued by the Banco Nacional de Bolivia in denominations of 1, 5, 10, 20, 50 and 100 bolivianos. 20 and 40 centavo notes were added in 1875. Notes were also issued by the Banco Agricola, the Banco de Bolivia y Londres, the Banco del Comercio, the Banco Francisco Argandoña, the Banco Industrial de La Paz (later the Banco Industrial), the Banco Mercatil and the Banco Potosi, with denominations of 1, 5, 10, 20, 50 and 100 bolivianos. The last issue of these private banks was made in 1911.

In 1903, the Treasury introduced notes in denominations of 50 centavos, 1, 5, 10 and 20 bolivianos. In 1911, the Banco de la Nación Boliviana began issuing notes. The first issue, in denominations of 1, 5, 10, 20, 50 and 100 bolivianos, was overprinted on notes of the Banco de Bolivia y Londres. Regular issues, in the same denominations, followed later the same year. In 1928, the Banco Central took over paper money issuance, with notes for 1, 5, 10, 20, 50, 100, 500 and 1000 bolivianos. 5000 and 10,000 boliviano notes followed in 1942. Post-inflation economic period annual percentage rate capital appreciation and growth made all the inflation period bolivianos cash banknotes at par value current and legally circulating with the new.

== See also ==
- Bolivian boliviano
- Economy of Bolivia
