= 2026 Bolivian Air Force Lockheed C-130 crash =

Aviation accident in El Alto, Bolivia

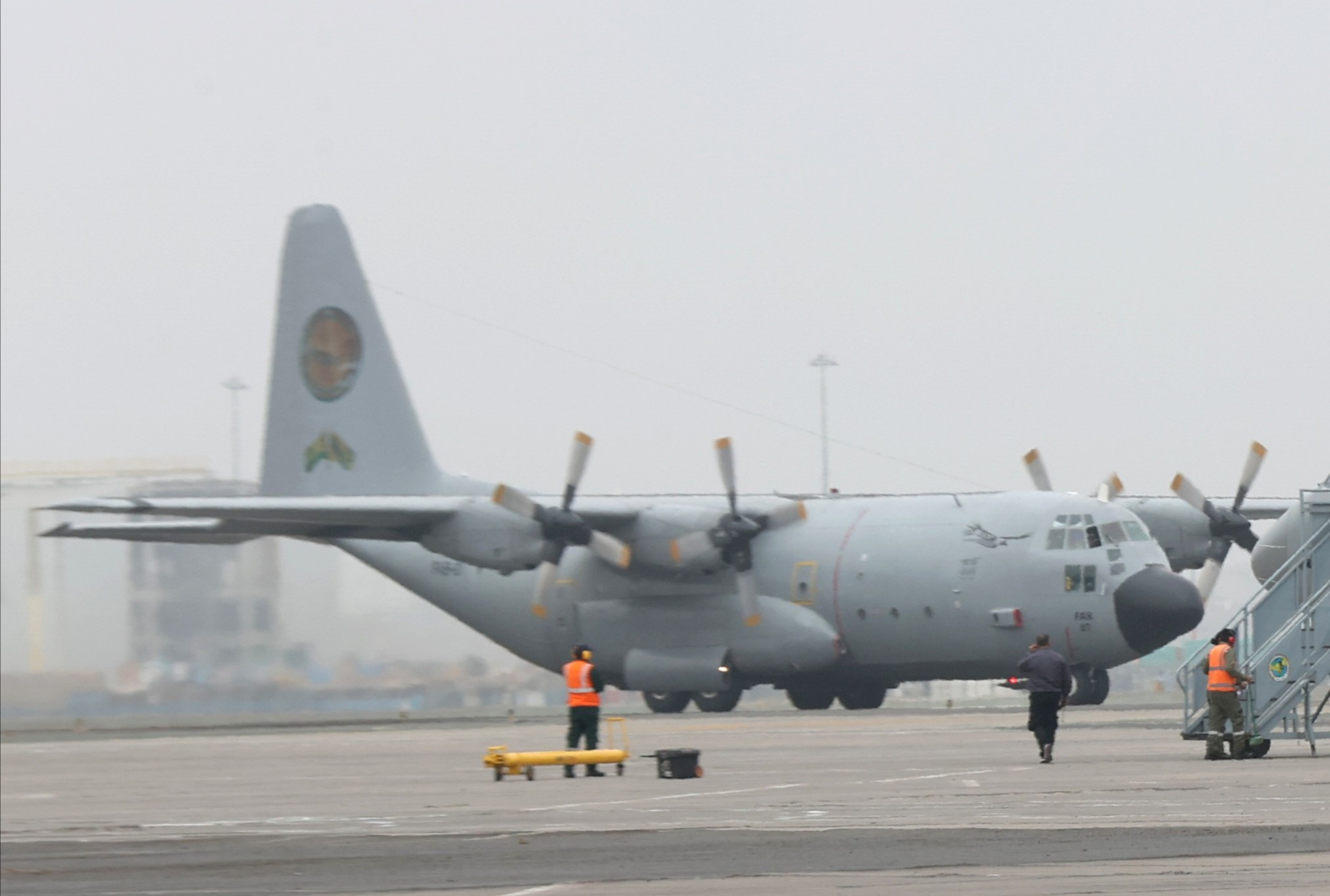
- FAB-81, the Lockheed C-130H Hercules involved in the accident, seen in 2024

Accident
- Date: 27 February 2026
- Summary: Crashed into a highway after runway excursion, under investigation
- Site: El Alto International Airport, El Alto, Bolivia; 16°30′46″S 68°13′0″W
- Total fatalities: 24
- Total injuries: 43

Aircraft
- Aircraft type: Lockheed C-130H Hercules
- Operator: Bolivian Air Force
- Registration: FAB-81
- Flight origin: Viru Viru International Airport, Santa Cruz de la Sierra, Bolivia
- Destination: El Alto International Airport, El Alto, Bolivia
- Occupants: 8
- Crew: 8
- Fatalities: 1
- Injuries: 6
- Survivors: 7

Ground casualties
- Ground fatalities: 23
- Ground injuries: 37

On 27 February 2026, a Lockheed C-130 Hercules from the Bolivian Air Force on a domestic flight from Viru Viru International Airport, [Santa Cruz de la Sierra, to El Alto International Airport, La Paz, suffered a runway excursion after landing and crashed onto a busy road, impacting 15 vehicles, killing 24 people, and injuring 43 others.

The aircraft was carrying a large shipment of newly printed banknotes on behalf of the Central Bank of Bolivia, intended to be distributed within the national monetary system. The impact scattered large quantities of banknotes across the crash site, drawing the attention of bystanders who attempted to collect the currency. Law enforcement authorities subsequently secured the area and later destroyed the banknotes to prevent their circulation.

== Background ==
=== Aircraft ===
The aircraft involved in the accident was a 49-year-old Lockheed C-130H Hercules, tail number FAB-81.

=== Crew ===
The crew on board the aircraft consisted of eight people:

- Alejandro Chávez Paniagua – pilot in command
- Erick Rojas Zambrana – copilot
- Mauricio Lazo Cordova – flight navigator
- César Castro Nacho – sub-officer
- Raúl Gutiérrez Limachi – loadmaster
- Rolando Flores Saiza – loadmaster
- José Luis Condori Tinta – loadmaster
- Jared Ramirez Espinoza – extra crew member

== Accident ==
After landing, the aircraft veered off the runway, destroying the west side perimeter fence of the airport terminal. It then entered Costanera Avenue, where it hit more than a dozen vehicles, including private cars, public transport vehicles, and cargo trucks before breaking into pieces and coming to rest. Witnesses at El Alto Airport said that the aircraft crashed into a high-traffic area. At the time of the crash, a heavy hailstorm was reported.

According to the La Paz Fire Department director and police, a total of 24 people died and 37 were injured. 23 of the fatalities were people on the ground, of whom 4 were children. Of the eight crew members on board, one died in the crash, while six others survived with major injuries and were taken to hospital to receive intensive care. At the time, one crew member was considered missing.

== Aftermath ==
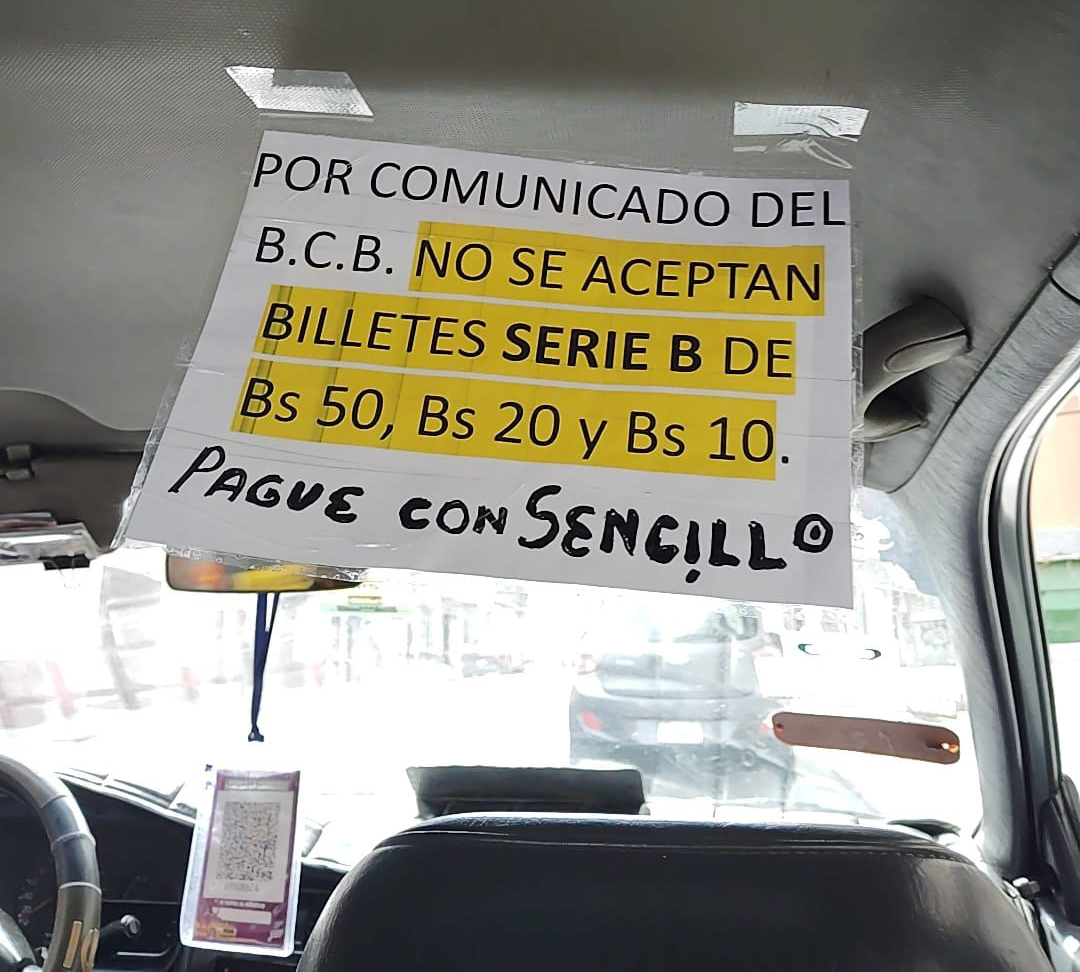
A sign posted inside a taxi in La Paz following the accident reads: "Per statement from the BCB, Bs. 50, Bs. 20, and Bs. 10 banknotes from the B-series are not accepted."

At a press conference, the director of the Directorate General of Civil Aeronautics, José Antonio Fanola, clarified that the plane veered off the runway after landing, contradicting rumors spread on social media about the aircraft "crashing". In a statement, Navegación Aérea y Aeropuertos Bolivianos (NAABOL) reported the accident and the suspension of activities at El Alto International Airport, with the terminal and other facilities closed until 21:30 on 27 February and with the possibility of extending the suspension period.

Soon after the accident, there were reports of attacks on police officers by people attempting to enter the premises after breaching the airport perimeter. The individuals involved were restrained by law enforcement officers, as they were accused of violating restricted space and hindering rescue efforts. Additional disturbances were reported in the vicinity of the scene. Images and videos on social media began circulating showing banknotes scattered across the crash site and people on the ground appearing to collect them. The growing crowd hindered rescue efforts and was later dispersed with water hoses by law enforcement authorities. A total of 15 vehicles were later confirmed to have been destroyed at the crash site, including one police vehicle and three ambulances. More than a dozen people were later arrested for collecting banknotes. Local authorities later proceeded to incinerate the banknotes at the crash site to prevent their circulation, as they had not yet officially entered the financial system.

Originally, Minister of Defence Marcelo Salinas said that the unissued notes in the crash had no serial numbers. However, the Central Bank of Bolivia later suspended the legal tender status of 10, 20, and 50-boliviano notes of the 2018 series with serial numbers ending with B, from 28 February to 2 March 2026: The Central Bank had published serial numbers of notes that were recovered in the crash and declared the affected notes worthless. When rescue teams left the site on 1 March, looters returned and began collecting burned banknotes, aircraft parts, and other items from the site, with some allegedly engaged in digging at the crash site for valuables. Local officials warned that any attempt to enter them into the financial system would be punished in accordance with the law and the general public was advised not to use these banknotes while investigations were underway.

The Asociación de Bancos Privados de Bolivia (ASOBAN), Bolivia's national association of private bank institutions, recommended that financial entities withdraw from circulation any banknotes bearing serial numbers matching those transported in the flight. ASOBAN further advised banks to reject cash deposits containing banknotes with the identified serial numbers and encouraged the public to prioritize electronic transactions.

== Responses ==
President Rodrigo Paz expressed his condolences to the families of the victims in an X post. Former President Jeanine Áñez expressed her sadness and offered a message of solidarity to the families who lost loved ones in the crash. The Bishop of the Diocese of El Alto, Monsignor Giovani Arana, expressed his condolences to the families of the deceased and survivors of the accident, urging the residents to respond with empathy and solidarity to any emergency. He said, "We cannot be indifferent to the pain of others; every life deserves support, compassion, and solidarity." Various private and governmental organizations have requested assistance and blood donations for survivors in critical condition. The campaign was coordinated by the La Paz Regional Reference Blood Bank Hemocenter.

== Investigation ==
On the morning of February 28, the Aeronautical Accident Investigation Board (AAIB) held a press conference to report on the ongoing investigation into the crash. The AAIB stated that they were searching for the black box, which they hoped would help determine the cause of the accident. Colonel Ricardo Alarcón of the AAIB stated, "Unfortunately, when the accident occurred, the public reacted impulsively, significantly contaminating the investigation area. The damage is obvious; we are searching for the flight recorder, which is what you call the black box". For the investigation, they transported the wreckage of the aircraft to a secure facility for analysis. The process was secured by personnel from the National Police and the National Army.

A technical report revealed that the plane was carrying a load that was at its maximum capacity and that the company in charge of delivering the banknotes to the Central Bank of Bolivia (BCB) was behind schedule, so it was under pressure. "Due to its enormous weight and the laws of aerodynamics, it was physically impossible for this wide-body aircraft to land with that load at the altitude of El Alto (over 4,000 meters above sea level)", the report states.

== See also ==
- 2026 in aviation
- List of accidents and incidents involving the Lockheed C-130 Hercules
- List of aircraft accidents and incidents by number of ground fatalities
