= Iván Guzmán =

Iván Guzmán may refer to:

- Iván Guzmán de Rojas (1934–2022), Bolivian artist and scientist
- Iván Archivaldo Guzmán Salazar (born 1983), Mexican drug lord
- Iván Guzmán (footballer)
