= Bolivian peso =

Former currency of Bolivia

peso boliviano (Spanish)
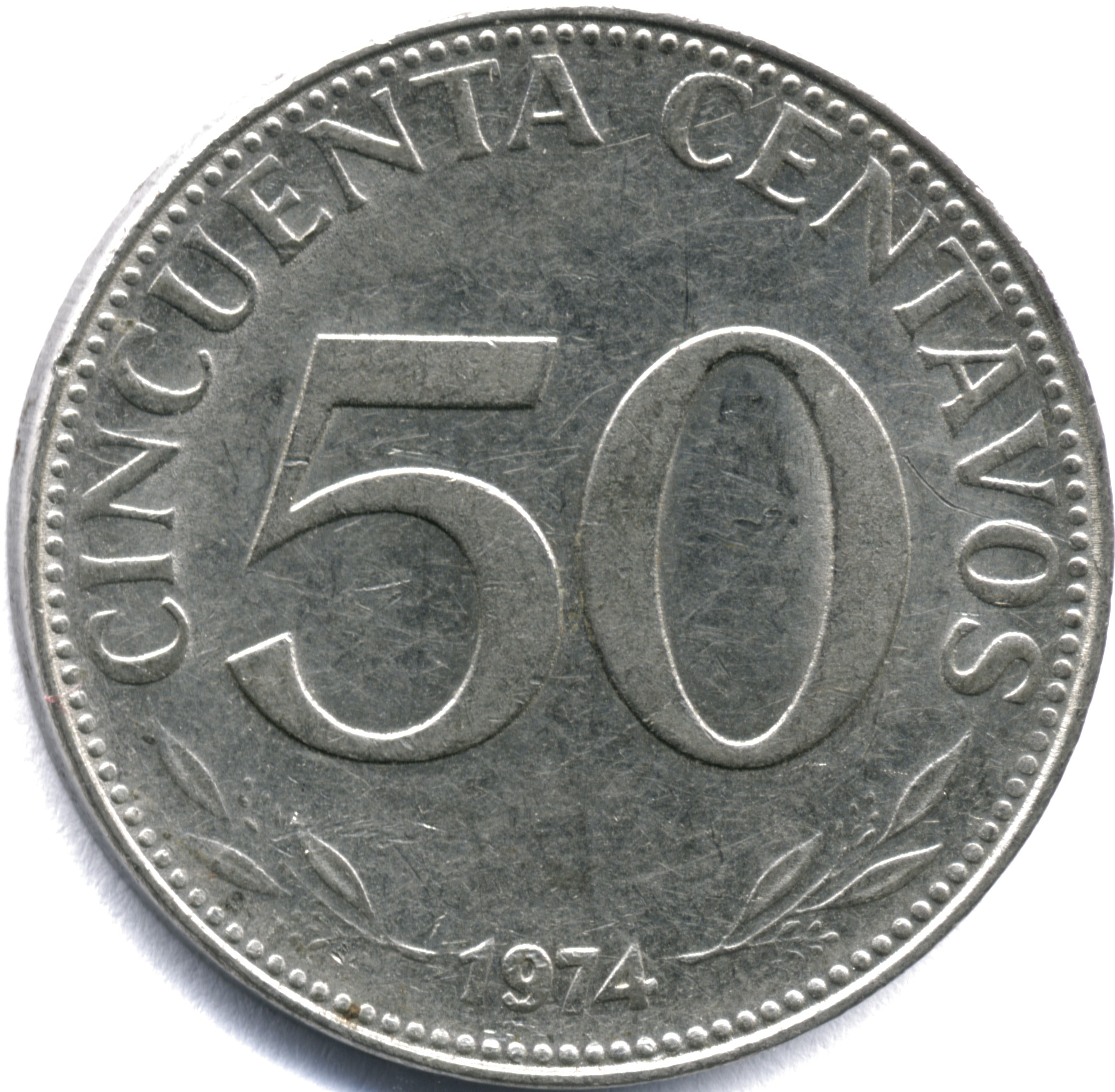
- Bolivian peso

ISO 4217
- Code: BOP

Unit
- Symbol: b$.

Denominations
- Subunit
- 1/100: centavo
- Banknotes: 1, 5, 10, 20, 50, 100, 500, 1000, 5000, 10,000, 50,000, 100,000 pesos bolivianos bank cheques: 5,000, 10,000, 20,000, 50,000, 100,000, 500,000, 1 million, 5 million, 10 million pesos bolivianos
- Coins: 5, 10, 20, 25, 50 centavos, 1, 5 pesos bolivianos

Demographics
- Date of introduction: January 1, 1963
- Replaced: Bolivian boliviano
- Date of withdrawal: December 31, 1986
- Replaced by: Bolivian boliviano
- User(s): Bolivia

Issuance
- Central bank: Banco Central de Bolivia
- Website: www.bcb.gob.bo

Valuation
- Value: 1000000 BOP = 1 BOB
- This infobox shows the latest status before this currency was rendered obsolete.

The peso boliviano (ISO 4217 code: BOP) was the currency of Bolivia from January 1, 1963, until December 31, 1986. It was replaced by the boliviano. It was divided into 100 centavos. The conversion rate was 1,000,000 pesos bolivianos to 1 boliviano. "$b." was the currency symbol for the peso boliviano.

== History ==
On December 15, 1959, Bolivia introduced a comprehensive economic stabilization program that abolished most currency restrictions on the boliviano, which had suffered badly from inflation. The program adopted a fluctuating exchange rate that was finally stabilized in 1962 at 11,875 bolivianos to the US dollar.

The currency reform of January 1, 1963 adopted the peso boliviano, equal to 1,000 bolivianos, with an initial central exchange rate of 11·875 per US$1. But inflation soon returned and the peso boliviano was devalued 39.4% on October 27, 1972, with a new official rate of 20·00 per US$1. This rate was maintained until November 30, 1979, when the peso boliviano was put on a controlled float, initially at 25.00 per dollar. Inflation accelerated. The official rate was devalued February 5, 1982 to 44 per US$1. The average exchange rate was 64.12 per in 1982, 229.78 per in 1983, and 2,314 per in 1984. By September 1985 the US dollar was worth a million pesos bolivianos on the black market. President Paz Estenssoro announced a free exchange rate for the peso, which was floated on August 29, 1985, resulting in an effective devaluation of 95%. All exchange controls were lifted and the exchange rate was set twice weekly according to supply and demand. The supply of pesos bolivianos in the economy was still expanding, and as a result, its value continued to fall and by January 1986 the government was setting a new exchange rate daily in an attempt to boost confidence in the economy. After reaching a low of about 2.2 million per US$1, the peso improved and stabilized around 1.8–1.9 million per dollar.

A new monetary unit, the boliviano, was created by Law No. 901 of November 28, 1986, and a currency reform was announced December 30, 1986, effective January 1, 1987. This new boliviano replaced the peso boliviano. At 1 boliviano = 1,000,000 pesos bolivianos.

== Coins ==
Reform coinage was introduced in 1965 in denominations of 5, 10, 20, and 50 centavos. A 1 peso boliviano coin was introduced in 1968, a 25-centavo coin in 1971, and a 5 peso boliviano coin in 1976. The last peso boliviano-denominated coins were struck in 1980.

(KM numbers from Standard catalog of world coins)

- copper-clad steel:
  - 01 km#187| 5c (1965, 1970)
  - 02 km#188| 10c (1965, 1967, 1969, 1971, 1972, 1973)
- nickel-clad steel:
  - 03 km#189| 20c (1965, 1967, 1970, 1971, 1973)
  - 06 km#193| 25c (1971, 1972)
  - 04 km#190| 50c, 24 mm, 4.000 g (1965, 1967, 1972, 1973, 1974, 1975, 1980)
  - 05 km#192| $b.1, 27 mm, 6.000 g (1968, 1969, 1970, 1972, 1973, 1974, 1978, 1980)
  - 07 km#197| $b.5, 30 mm, 8.500 g (1976, 1978, 1980)

== Paper ==
=== Summary ===
Banknotes denominated in the peso boliviano were released in 1963 in denominations of 1, 5, 10, 20, 50, and 100. For a time, the denomination in the old boliviano appeared on the back of the notes. A 500 was added to the series in 1981 and a 1000 in 1982.

In 1982 the $b.100 was released in a simplified version, without a security thread and with the back lithographed rather than engraved. Fearing that these poorer quality notes were forgeries, people avoided them to such an extent that after a few months Banco Central Bank resumed issuing the older type of 100.

As inflation gathered pace, Banco Central introduced cheques de gerencia (cashier's cheques, certified cheques, bank drafts) for 5000 and 10,000 pesos bolivianos in 1982.

By the summer of 1983 notes of 1, 5, and 20 were no longer seen in circulation, which consisted of notes for 10, 50, 100, 500, and 1000 pesos bolivianos. Denominations of 5000 and 10,000 appeared sometime later.

Hyperinflation left insufficient time to provide for regular banknotes, and 1984-1985 saw Banco Central release the simpler cheques de gerencia for 20,000, 50,000, 100,000, 500,000, 1 million, 5 million, and 10 million pesos bolivianos (printed by four different printers). Regular banknotes for 50,000 and 100,000 pesos also appeared in circulation, being that such banknotes have a similar design to the 5-peso and 1-peso banknotes respectively.

By the spring of 1986 the currency in circulation effectively consisted of cheques de gerencia ranging from 100,000 to 10 million pesos bolivianos and "low" denomination banknotes of 50,000 and 100,000 pesos bolivianos.

=== Banknotes ===
(P numbers from Standard catalog of world paper money) 1963 emission (authorized July 13, 1962), printed by Thomas de La Rue; unwatermarked; clear security thread with continuous staggered "BOLIVIA" microprinted in black (type 1). The note denomination on the face in pesos bolivianos and on the back in old bolivianos:

- 01 P-152| $b.1 (black) Campesino (peasant)
- 02 P-153| $b.5 (blue) Gualberto Villarroel
- 03 P-154| $b.10 (green) Germán Busch
- 04 P-155| $b.20 (purple) Pedro Domingo Murillo
- 05 P-156| $b.50 (orange) Antonio José de Sucre
- 06 P-157| $b.100 (red) Simón Bolívar

These notes were modified by eliminating the old boliviano denomination from the backs:

- 01A P-158| $b.1
- 04A P-161| $b.20
- 05A P-162| $b.50
- 06A P-163| $b.100

1981-1982 new denominations: a 500 authorized June 1, 1981;a 1000, June 25, 1982: printed by American Bank Note Company; portrait watermark; clear security thread with continuous “BCB” microprinted in black (type 2):

- 07 P-155| $b. 500 (bluegreen) Eduardo Avaroa

printed by Thomas de La Rue; portrait watermark; type 1 security thread:

- 07A P-156| $b.500
- 08 P-157| $b.1000 (black) Juana Azurduy de Padilla

1982 simplified emission, printed by Thomas de La Rue; back lithographed; no watermark, no thread:

- 06B P-164a| $b.100 (red)

1983 return to familiar security features, printed by Thomas de La Rue; back engraved; no watermark, solid metal security thread

- 06C P-164A| $b.100

1984 new denominations, authorized February 2, 1984: printed by Bundesdruckerei; portrait watermark; clear security thread with continuous “BANCO CENTRAL DE BOLIVIA” microprinted in black (type 3):

- 11 P-168| $b.5000 (brown) José Ballivián y Segurola

printed by Thomas de La Rue; portrait watermark; type 3 security thread:

- 12 P-169| $b.10,000 (purple) Andrés de Santa Cruz

printed by Thomas de La Rue; no watermark; no security thread; designs of the 5 and 1 of 1962 with altered denomination and changed colors:

- 18 P-170| $b.50,000 (green) Gualberto Villarroel
- 19 P-171| $b.100,000 (brownviolet) Campesino (peasant)

=== Bank checks ===
(P numbers from Standard catalog of world paper money)

1982 emission authorized by "Decreto Supremo No. 19078 de 28 de Julio de 1982"; cheque pattern, both black on lilac:

- 09 P-172| $b.5000
- 10 P-173| $b.10,000

Regular cheques de gerencia were evidently pressed into service out of necessity in 1984 at Santa Cruz (dated June 6 or June 7;, P-176 $b.50,000 and P178 $b.1,000,000) and at La Paz (dated June 4 or June 18; P-180 $b.100,000, P-181 $b.500,000, and P-182 $b.1,000,000). The circumstances of their use require further clarification.

1984 emission authorized by "Decreto Supremo No. 20272, 5 junio de 1984": printed by Jeffries Bank Note Company, undated and with a 90-day validity clause; common design of Mercury in circle upper left, all brown & pink:

- 13 P-183| $b.10,000
- 14 P-184| $b.20,000
- 15 P-185| $b.50,000

printed by Casa da Moeda (Brazil), dated December 21, with 90-day validity clause:

- 16 P-188| $b.100,000 (red-brown & blue-green)

printed by Jeffries Bank Note Company, dated June 20, no validity clause:

- 13A P-186| $b.10,000 (blue, pink & yellow)
- 14A P-187| $b.20,000 (green & pink)

printed by Casa da Moeda (Brazil), no validity clause:

- 17 P-189| $b.500,000 (green & pink)

1985 emission authorized by "Decreto Supremo No. 20732 de 8 de Marzo de 1985": printed by Casa da Moeda (Brazil), Mercury design:

- 20 P-190| $b.1,000,000 (blue & yellow)
- 26 P-192A| $b.5,000,000 (brown-orange & red)
- 27 P-192B| $b.10,000,000 (maroon & slate blue)

printed by Giesecke & Devrient (Germany), Mercury design:

- 21 P-191| $b.5,000,000 (brown-orange & red)
- 22 P-192| $b.10,000,000 (rose, blue & tan)

printed by Casa de Moneda (Argentina), geometric pattern:

- 25 P-192C| $b.1,000,000 (blue)
- 23 P-193| $b.5,000,000 (brown)
- 24 P-194| $b.10,000,000 (lilac)
