= National Museum of Women in the Arts =

- U.S. National Register of Historic Places
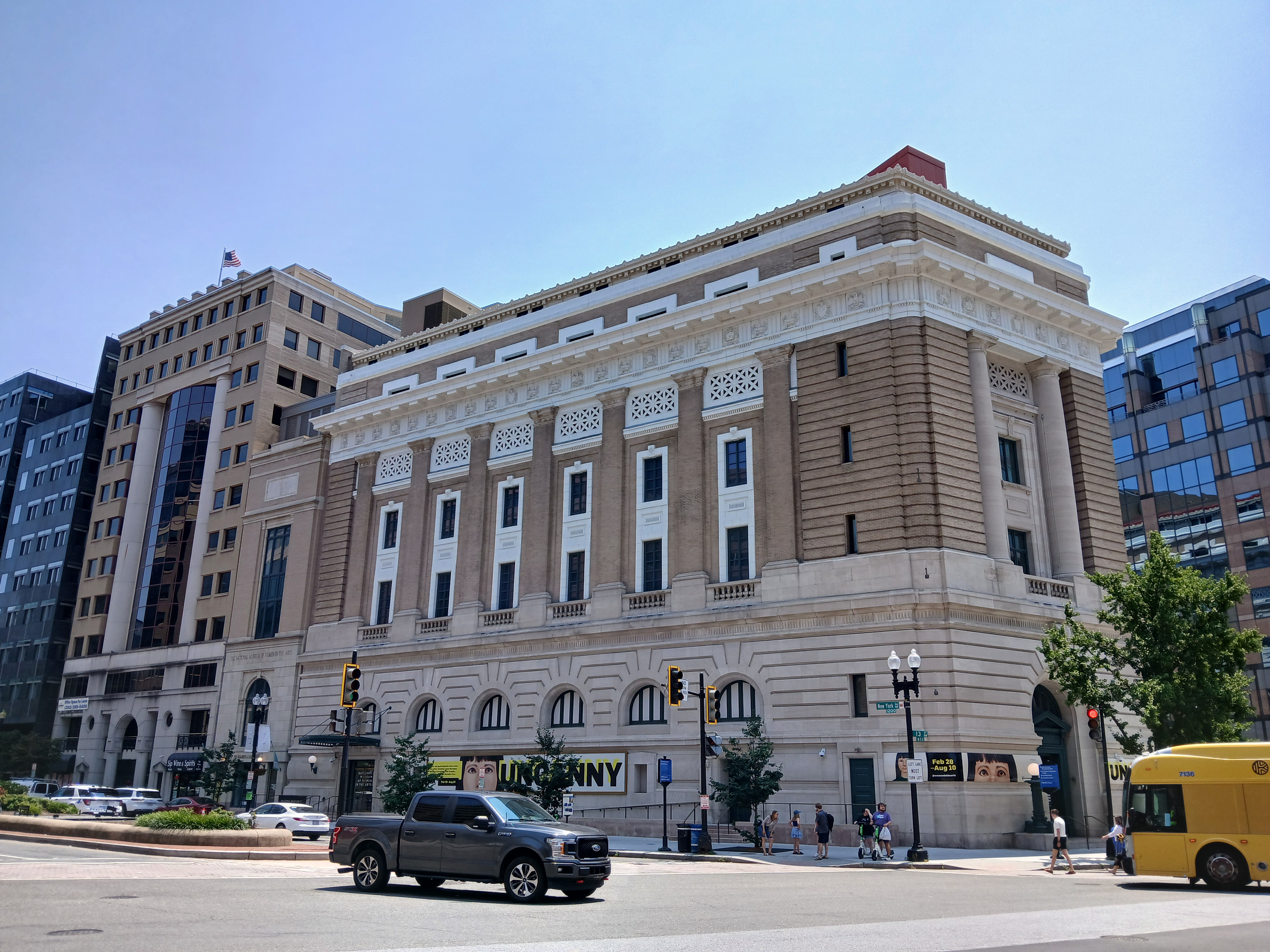
- National Museum of Women in the Arts

- Location within Central Washington, D.C. Location within the United States
- Interactive fullscreen map
- Location: 1250 New York Ave NW; Washington, D.C., U.S.
- Coordinates: 38°54′00″N 77°01′46″W
- Area: 0.3 acres (0.12 ha)
- Built: 1903
- Architect: Wood, Donn & Deming
- Architectural style: Classical Revival
- Website: nmwa.org
- NRHP reference No.: 86002920
- Added to NRHP: February 18, 1987

The National Museum of Women in the Arts (NMWA), located in Washington, D.C., is "the first museum in the world solely dedicated" to championing women through the arts. NMWA was incorporated in 1981 by Wallace and Wilhelmina Holladay. Since opening in 1987, the museum has acquired a collection of more than 6,000 works by more than 1,000 artists, ranging from the 16th century to today. The collection includes works by Mary Cassatt, Alma Woodsey Thomas, Élisabeth Louise Vigée-LeBrun, and Amy Sherald. NMWA also holds the only painting by Frida Kahlo in Washington, D.C., Self-Portrait Dedicated to Leon Trotsky.

The museum occupies the old Masonic Temple, a building listed on the U.S. National Register of Historic Places. In 2021 the museum temporarily closed to undergo a $66 million transformative renovation. The museum reopened to the public on October 21, 2023.

== History ==
The museum was founded to reform traditional histories of art. It is dedicated to discovering and making known women artists who have been overlooked, erased, or unacknowledged, and assuring the place of women in contemporary art. The museum's founder, Wilhelmina Cole Holladay, and her husband Wallace F. Holladay began collecting art in the 1960s, just as scholars were beginning to discuss the under-representation of women in museum collections and major art exhibitions.

Impressed by a 17th-century Flemish still life painting by Clara Peeters that they saw in Europe, they sought out information on Peeters and found that the definitive art history texts referenced neither her nor any other woman artist. They became committed to collecting artwork by women and eventually to creating a museum and research center.

The NMWA was incorporated in December 1981 as a private, non-profit museum, and the Holladay donation became the core of the institution's permanent collection. After purchasing and extensively renovating a former Masonic Temple, NMWA opened in April 1987 with the inaugural exhibition American Women Artists, 1830–1930.

To underscore its commitment to increasing the attention given to women in all disciplines, NMWA commissioned Pulitzer Prize-winning composer Ellen Taaffe Zwilich to write Concerto for Two Pianos and Orchestra inspired by five paintings from the permanent collection, for an opening concert. As of 2022, Director Susan Fisher Sterling heads a staff of more than 50 people.

=== Building ===
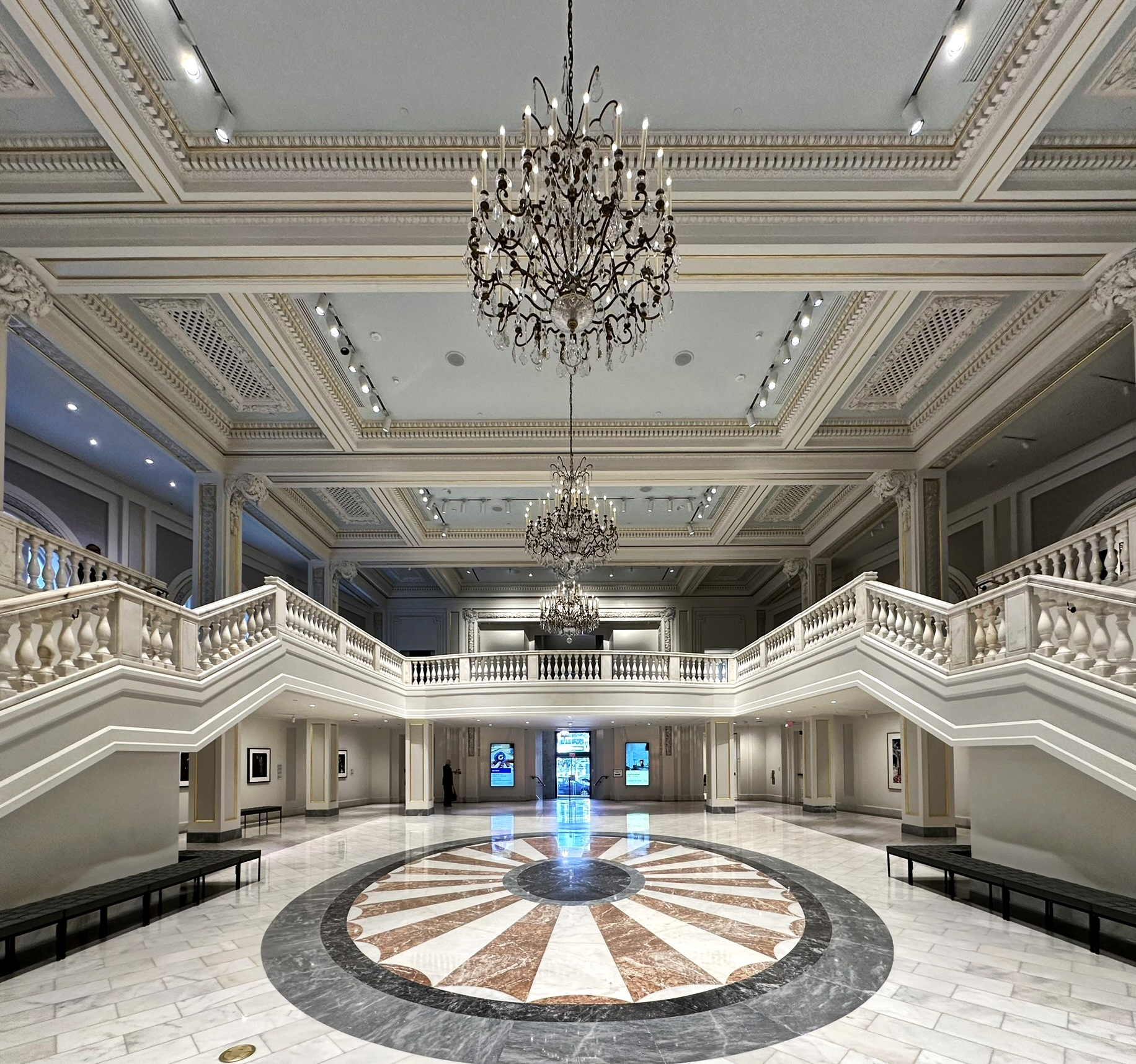
Interior of the main floor

The 78,810-square-foot (7,322 m^{2}) building, originally with the function of a Masonic Temple, is a Renaissance Revival style building. The building was the headquarters of the Grand Lodge of the District of Columbia. It replaced an older building constructed in 1870 at 9th and F streets (which as of 2013 was still standing). Initially drafted by architect Waddy B. Wood, the main building was completed in 1908 in an effort to bring the City Beautiful movement to Washington, D.C. Wood was recognized as being especially supportive of women architects during his lifetime. The lot that was known as "Seven Oaks" was bought for $115,000 in 1899. As the building was originally designed, the upper floors were reserved for Masonic rites, the middle floors were office space, and an auditorium on the first floor was meant to be rented out as a source of income. The building began showing silent films in 1916, following a renovation. From 1941 until 1983, the auditorium was used as a public movie theater.

The Masonic Temple was nearly torn down before a local group named Don't Tear It Down intervened, requesting that it be preserved. In 1983 the building was put up for sale by the Freemasons and was purchased that year by the National Museum of Women, under its first director Anne-Imelda Radice. The interior of the building was renovated, with the auditorium converted into a special events space. The museum opened to the public on April 7, 1987. When it opened, the museum had over 500 pieces in its permanent collection. The permanent collection was housed on the third floor, while rotating temporary exhibits took up the second floor. From the start, the museum had detractors who claimed that its existence would isolate female artists from the broader art community, or that it was being created solely for political reasons.

In 1994, the museum bought a site at 1220 New York Avenue Northwest for an expansion. The Elisabeth A. Kasser Wing, named for an art patron whose children donated funds for the expansion, was opened in November 1997. The annex consisted of two new galleries, a larger museum shop, and a reception room. The new facilities added 5,300 square feet (490 m^{2}), bringing the entire facility to 84,110 square feet (7,814 m^{2}).

The museum closed in August 2021 for a major renovation, which was designed by Sandra Vicchio & Associates. Key improvements include enlarged gallery space, a new destination for researchers and education programs, enhanced amenities and accessibility for visitors as well as infrastructure and storage upgrades to improve the long-term conservation and security of the museum's collection. The project involved adding 2,500 square feet (230 m^{2}) of gallery space, a learning center, and a renovated fifth-story performance space. Following the renovation, the museum reopened to the public on October 21, 2023. It is variously cited as having cost $67.5 million or $70 million.

=== Wilhelmina Cole Holladay ===
Wilhelmina Cole Holladay (1922–2021) was the founder and chair of the Board of the National Museum of Women in the Arts. Holladay sought to promote women's accomplishments in founding the museum. Holladay created individual committees of over 1,000 volunteers from 27 states and seven countries, to give educational opportunities to children through collaborations with schools and other community groups, as well as provided opportunities for adults to participate and encourage art in local communities across the globe.

Wilhelmina Cole Holladay's interest in art was sparked as a student at Elmira College in New York, where she studied art history, followed by graduate work at the University of Paris. She is listed in Who's Who of American Women, Who's Who in American Art, Who's Who in the World, and she held many honorary degrees and achievement awards for her work in the arts community. In 2006 she received the National Medal of Arts from the United States and the Légion d'honneur from the French government. In 2007 Holladay received the gold medal for the Arts from the National Arts Club in New York City.

=== New York Avenue Sculpture Project ===
The museum sponsored a series of installations on New York Avenue in Washington, DC from 13th Street to 9th Street, in the heart of Mount Vernon Square. The point of the effort was to bring "character" to an area where "there is a lot of good stuff going on," due to revitalization programs in the neighborhood.

Niki de Saint Phalle's works, four in total, were the first in a series of installations. The installation (from April 28, 2010 to October 30, 2011) of de Saint Phalle's iconic pop art works was meant as a contrast to the traditional sculpture that graces the streets and squares of Washington. All five major median strips were made into "sculpture islands," as described by National Museum of Women in the Art's director Susan Fisher Sterling. Another inspiration for the project came from the lack of innovative contemporary art in Washington, encouraging the evolution of the area.

The project was sponsored by Medda Gudelsky, the D.C. Downtown B.I.D., the Philip L. Graham Fund, the Homer and Martha Gudelsky Family Foundation, members of the museum, and the D.C. Department of Transportation. The works remained up for one year.

From March 8, 2012 to April 27, 2014, for the next New York Avenue Sculpture Project Chakaia Booker created four sculptures from “recycled tires that are cut, shaped and folded, then woven into dynamic, highly textured sculptures.”

The next New York Avenue Sculpture Project was created by Magdalena Abakanowicz and was on display from September 27, 2014 to September 27, 2015. The works were “monumentally-scaled sculptures of grouped human figures and birds in flight exemplify issues universal to humankind: the power of nature, the force of destruction and the resiliency of hope.”

The most recent New York Ave Sculpture Project was created by Betsabeé Romero and was on display from September 28, 2018 to May 2, 2021. For the four sculptures she “assembled carved and painted tires into totemic structures that speak to themes of human migration and the natural environment.”

== Collection ==
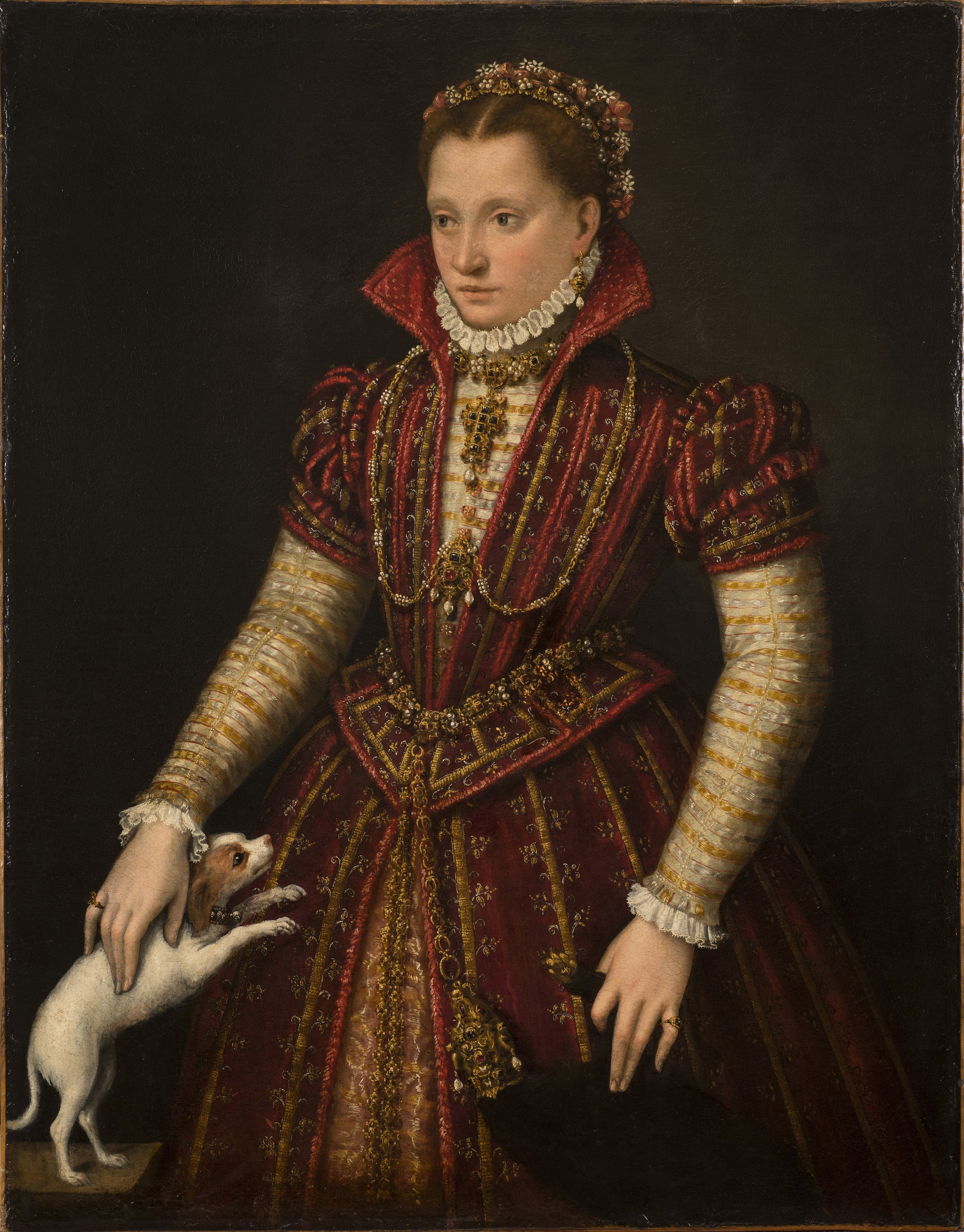
Portrait of a Noblewoman (1580), Lavinia Fontana

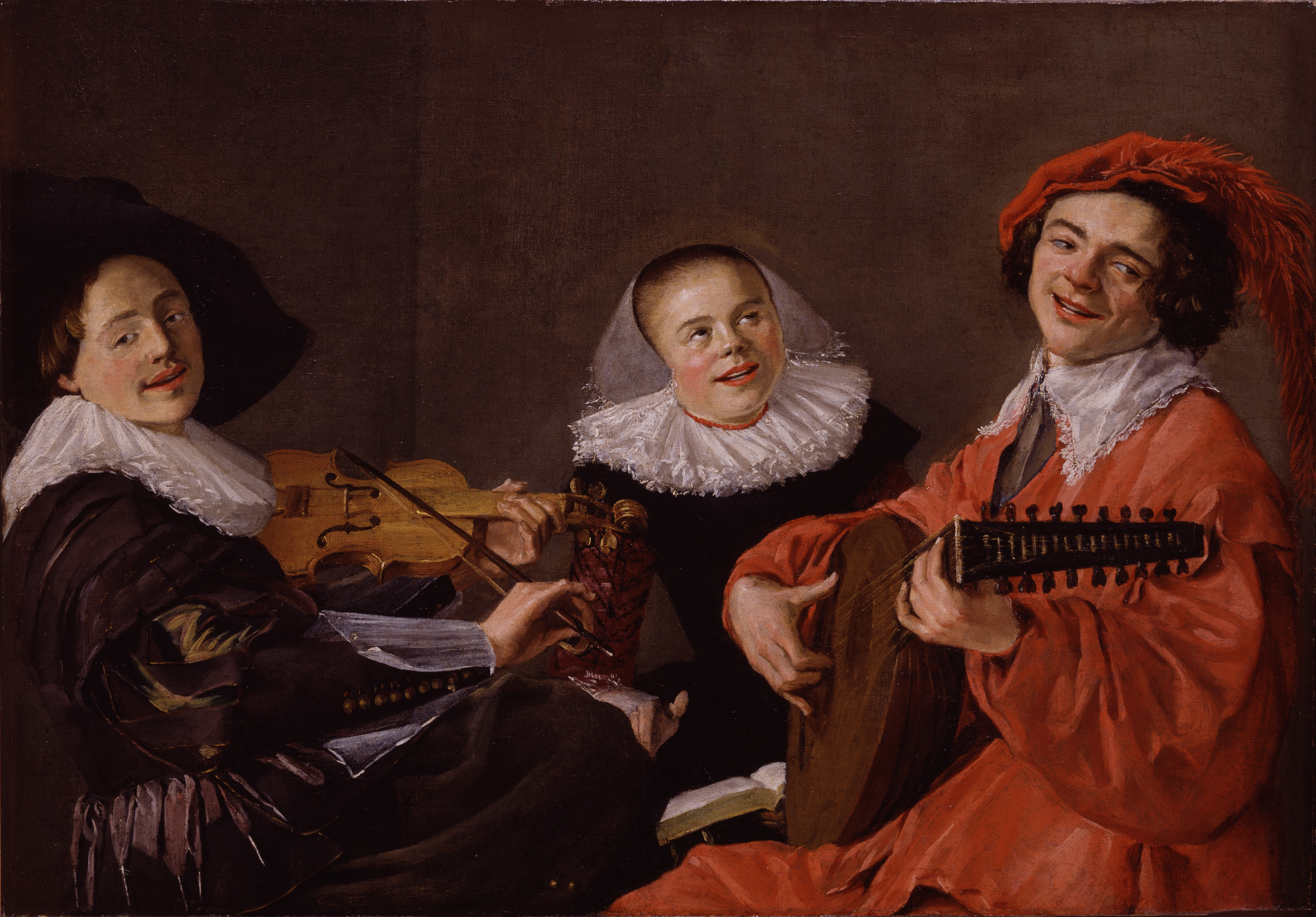
The Concert (1631), Judith Leyster

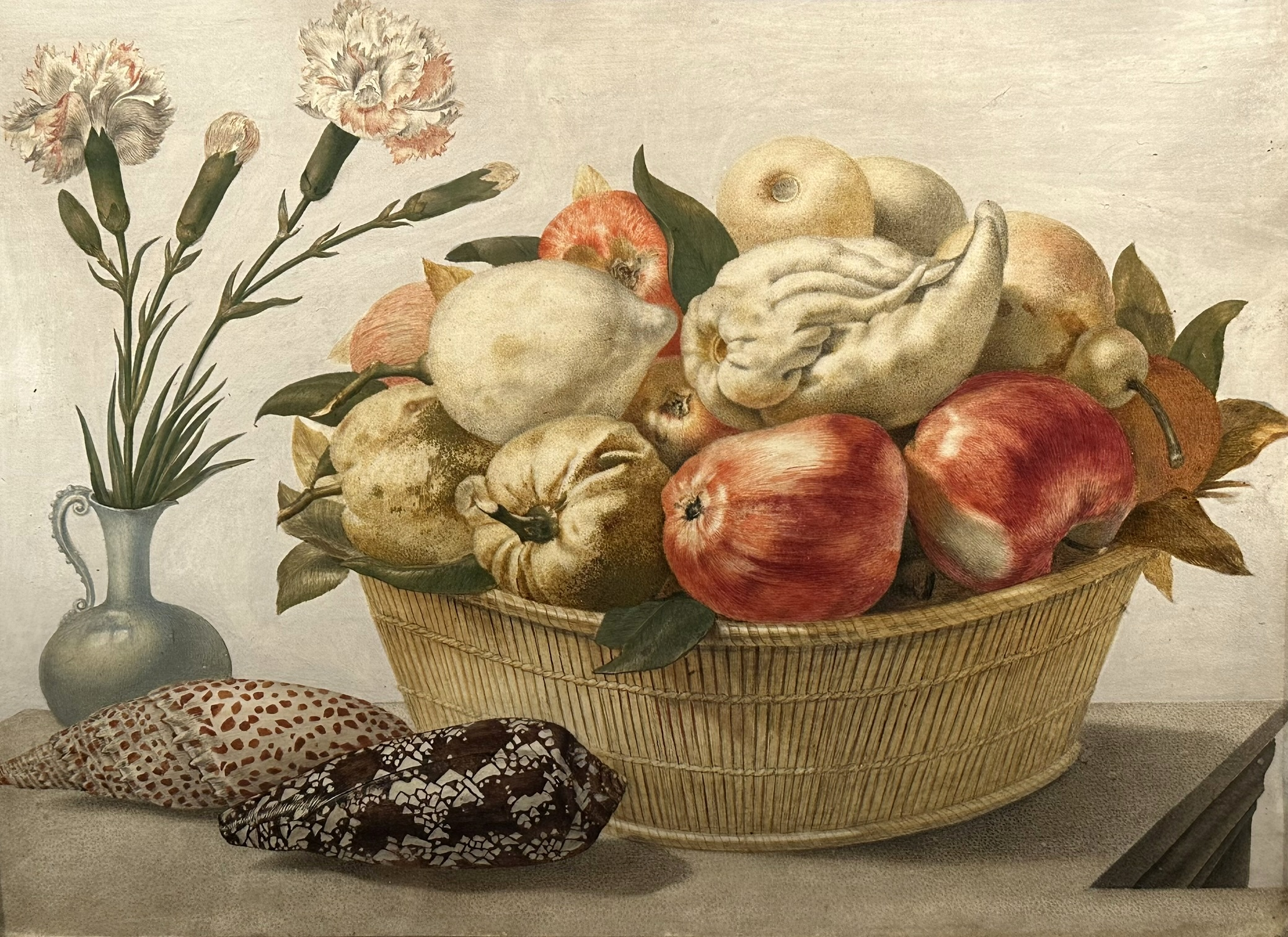
Still Life with Basket of Fruit, Vase with Carnations, and Shells on a Table (1652), Giovanna Garzoni

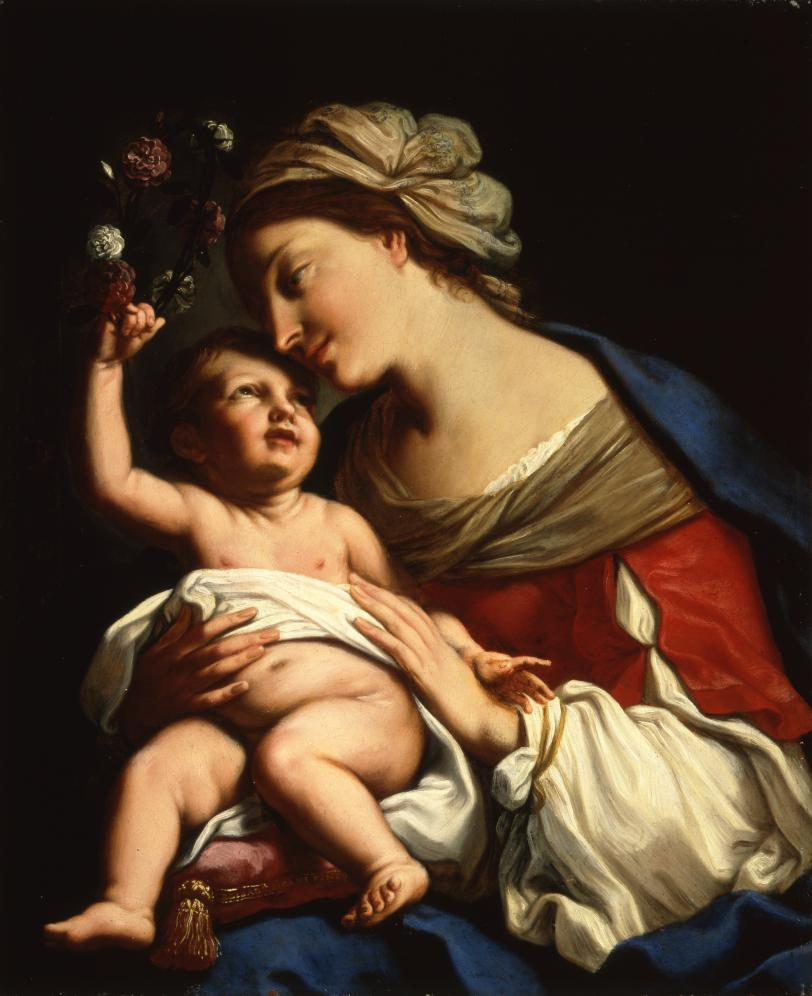
Virgin and Child (1663), Elisabetta Sirani

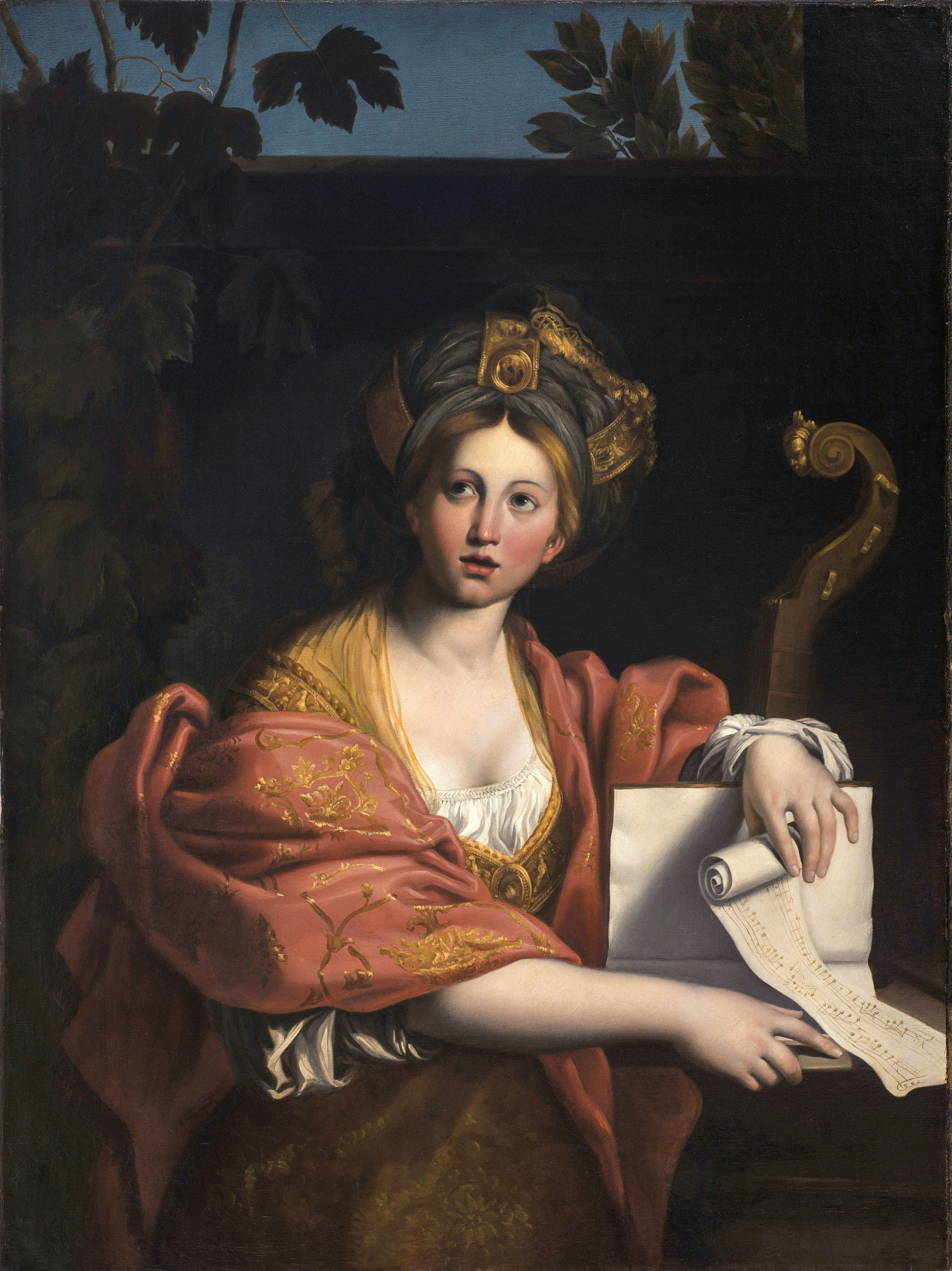
Cumaean Sibyl (1763), Angelica Kauffman

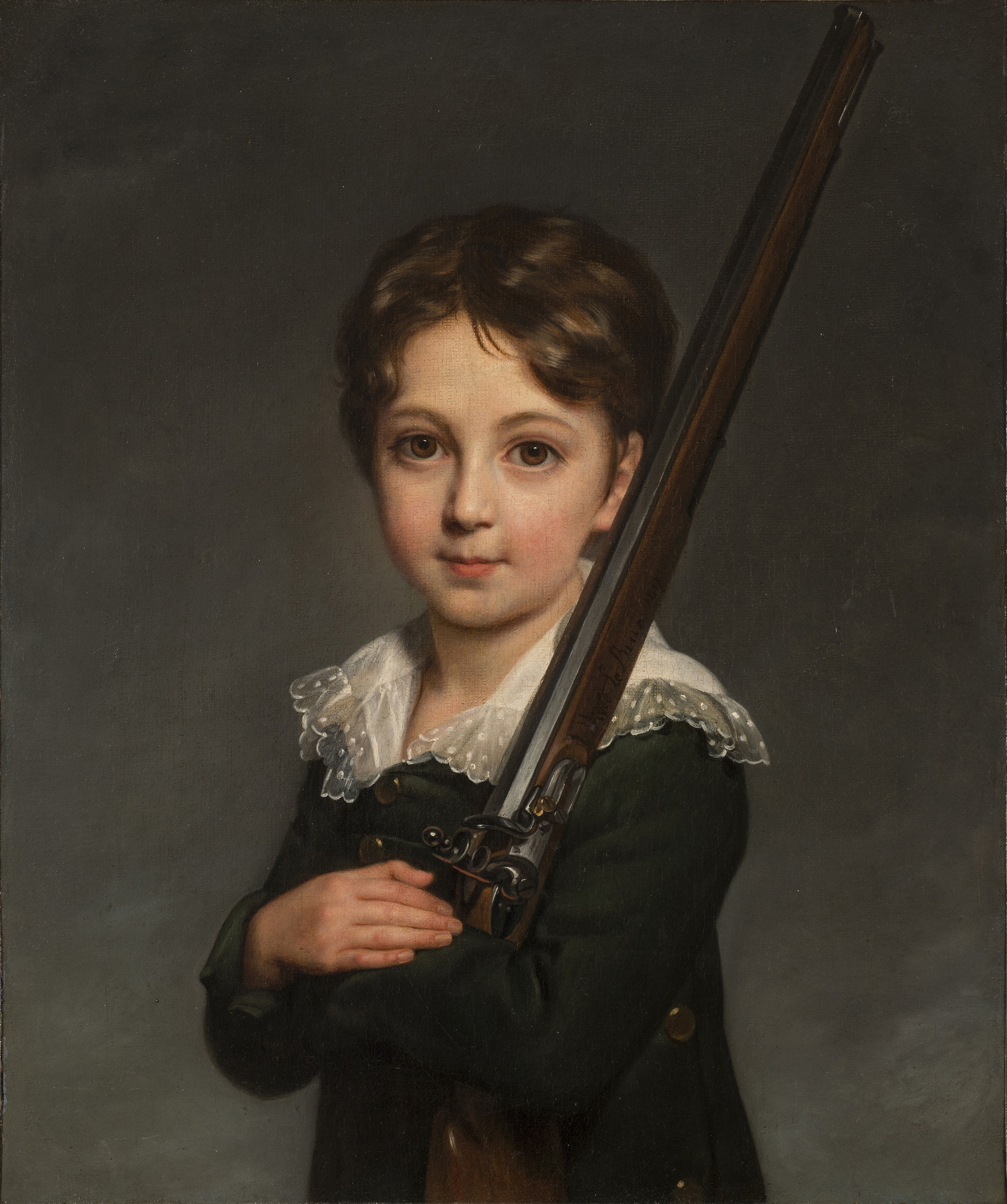
Portrait of a young boy (1817), Élisabeth Vigée Le Brun

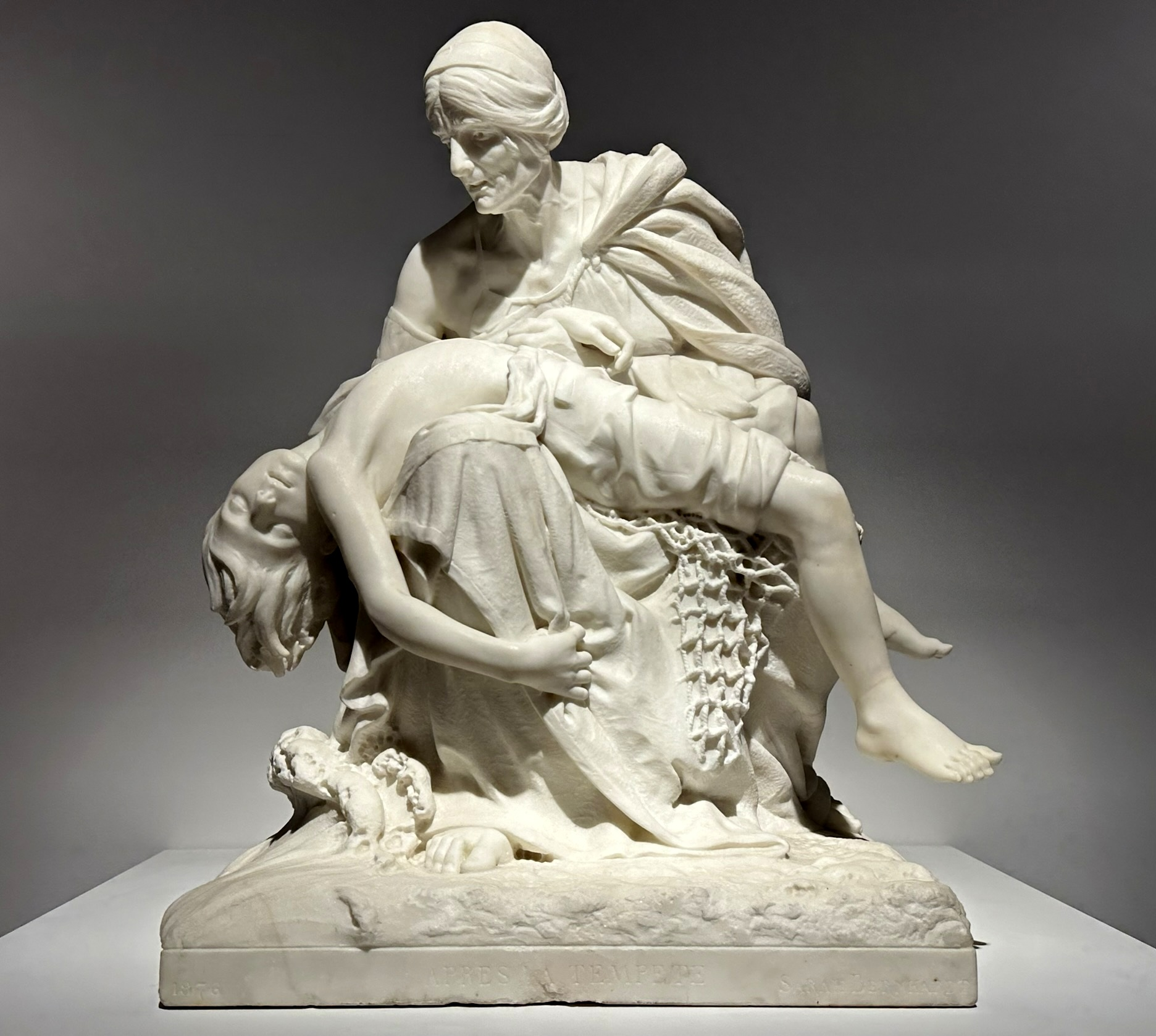
After the Storm (1876), Sarah Bernhardt

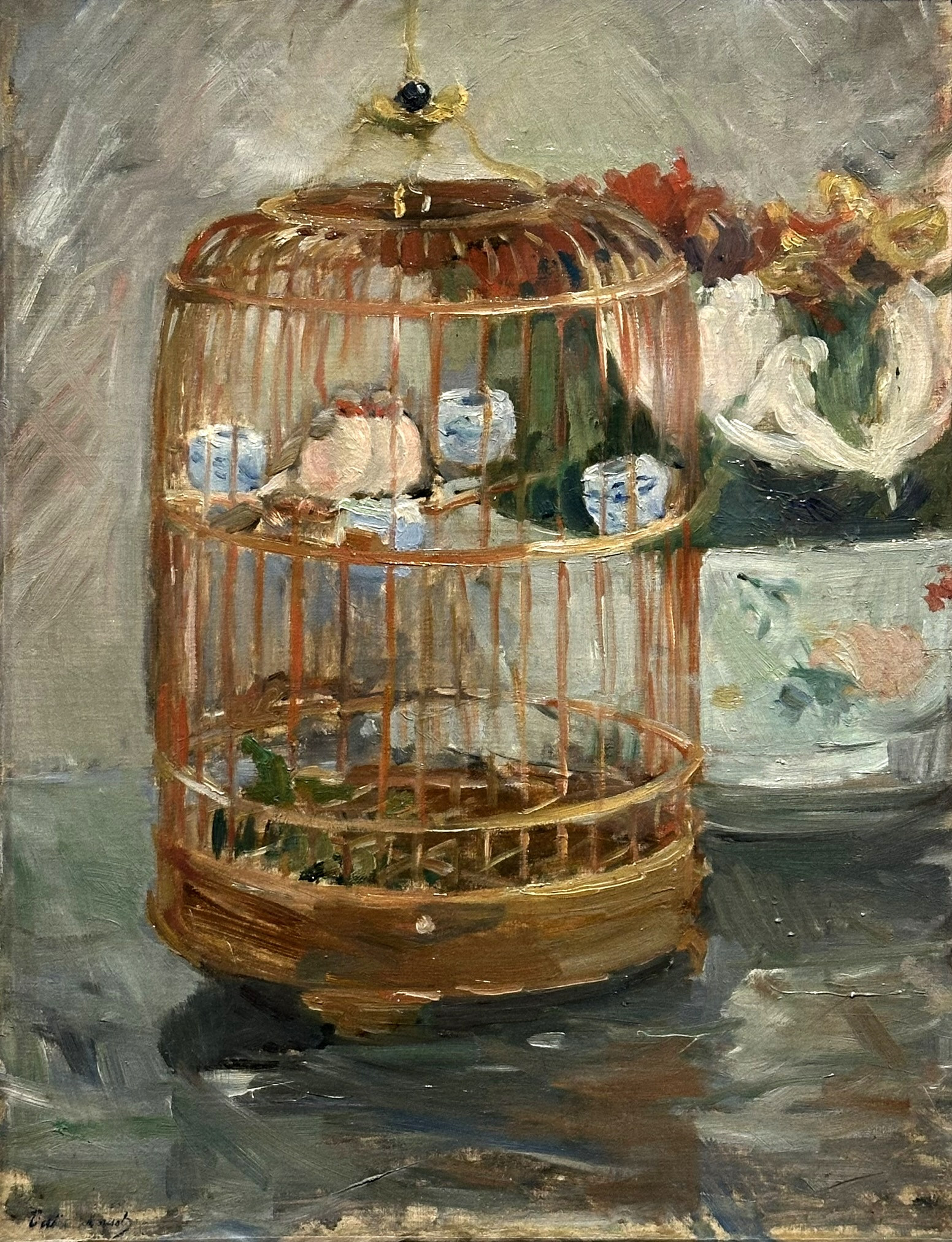
The Cage (1885), Berthe Morisot

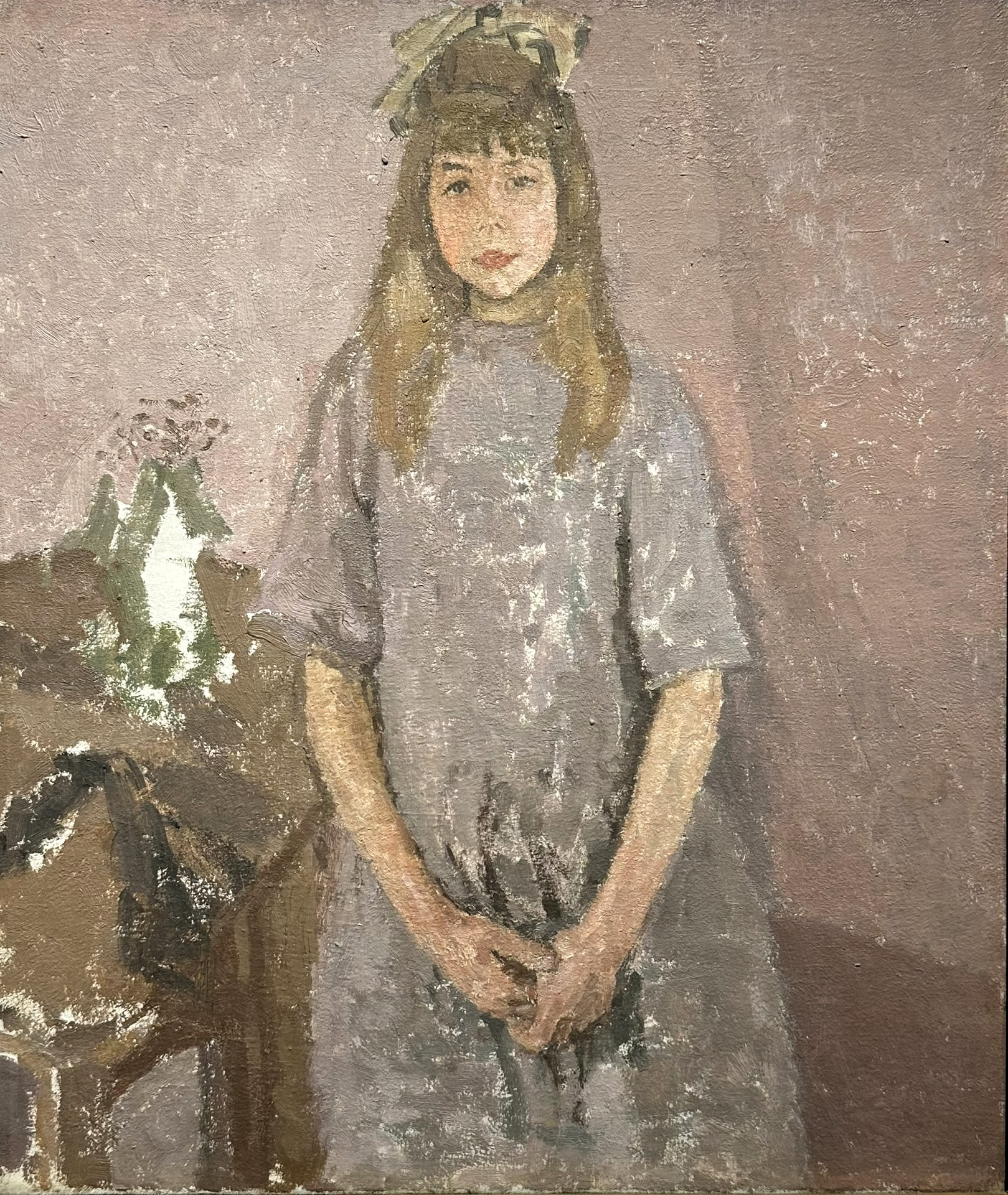
The Little Model (1915–1920), Gwen John

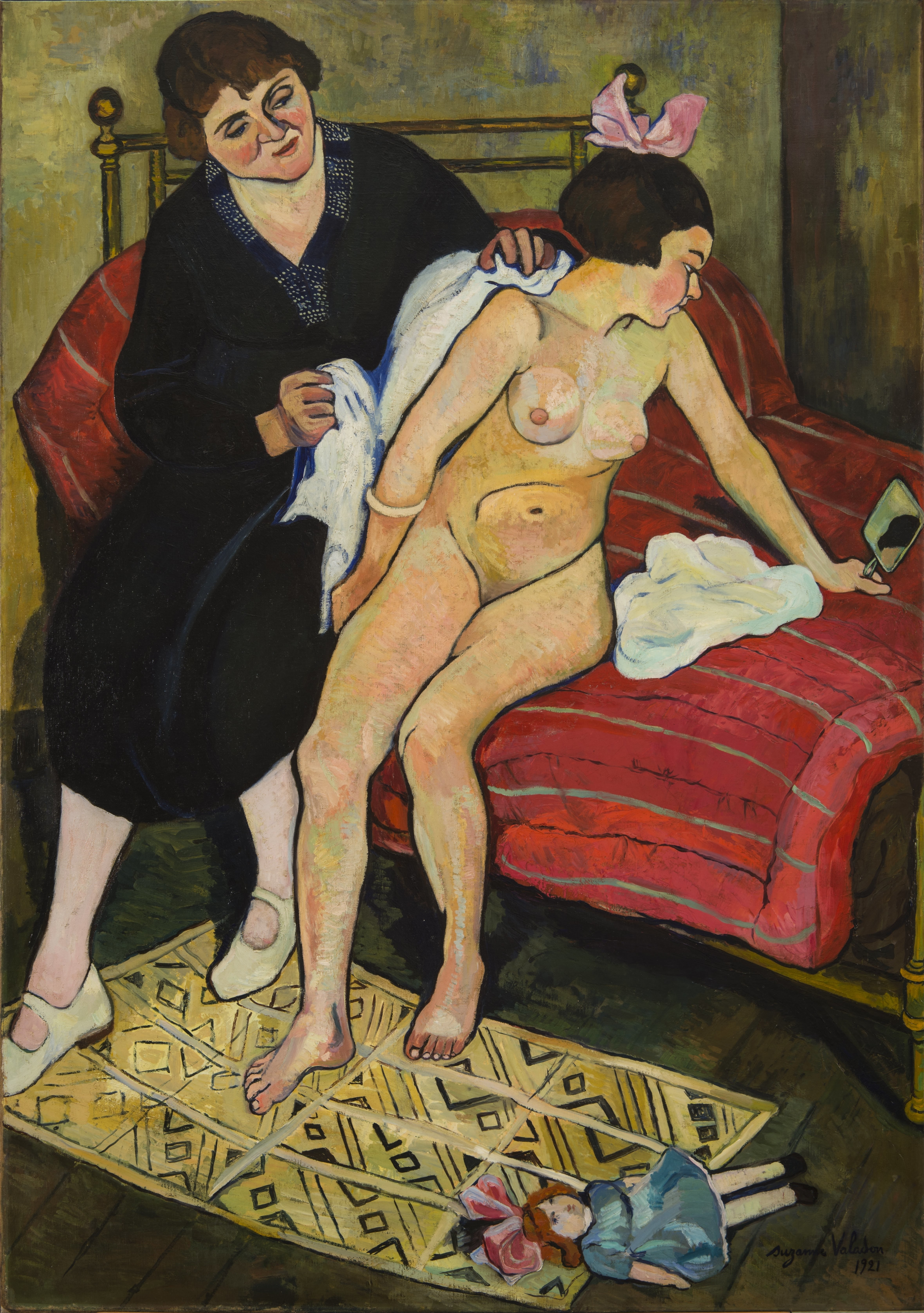
The Abandoned Doll (1921), Suzanne Valadon

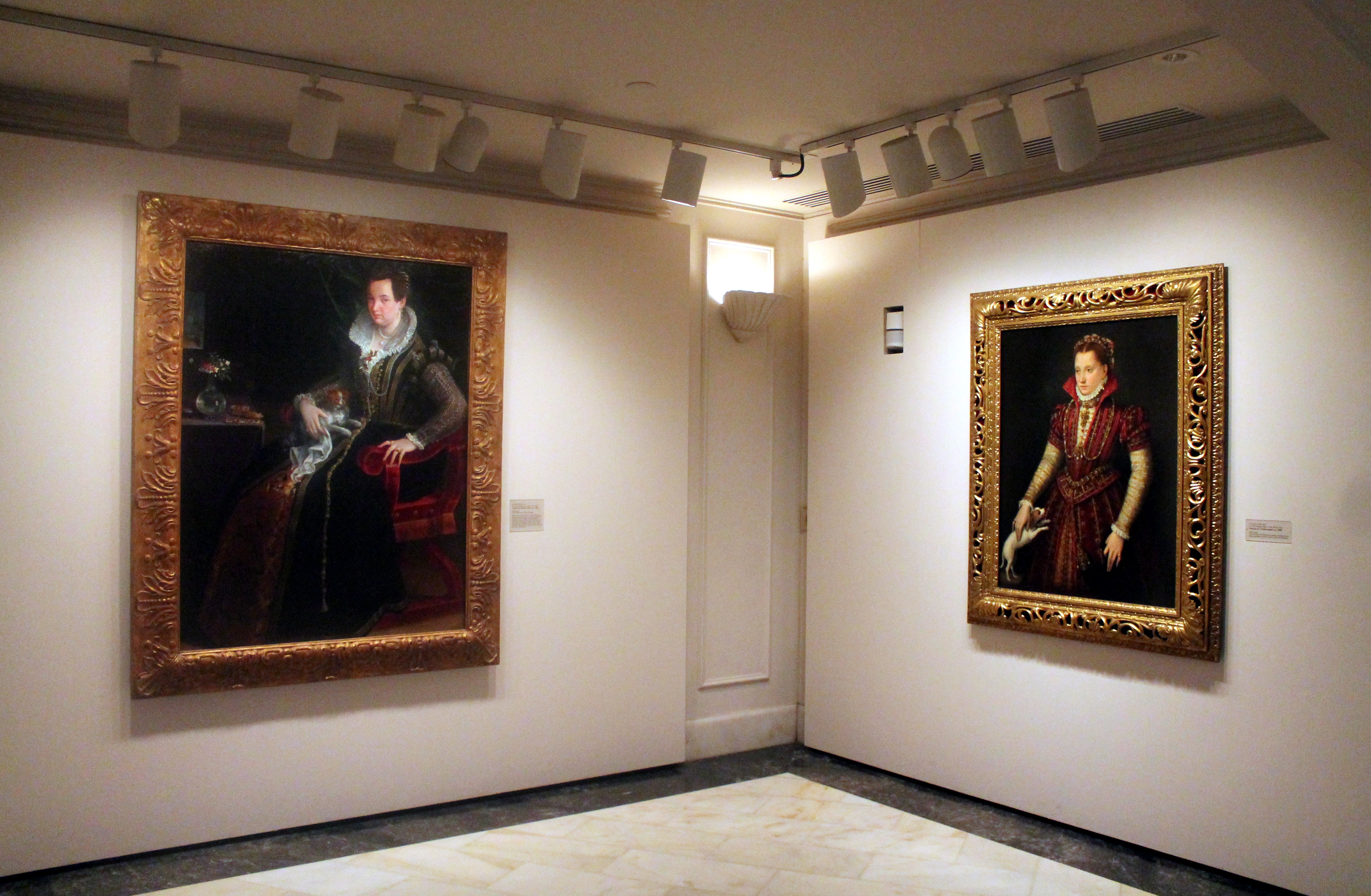
Two paintings of Lavinia Fontana exhibited at the NMWA: Portrait of Costanza Alidosi and Marriage Portrait of a Bolognese Noblewoman.

The collection currently contains more than 4,500 works in a variety of styles and media, spanning from the 16th century to present day. Among the earliest works is Lavinia Fontana’s Portrait of a Noblewoman, ca. 1580. There are also a number of special collections, including 18th-century botanical prints, works by British and Irish women silversmiths from the 17th–19th centuries, and more than 1,000 unique and limited edition artists’ books.

Nearly 1,000 artists are represented, including Magdalena Abakanowicz, Lynda Benglis, Rosa Bonheur, Chakaia Booker, Louise Bourgeois, Lola Alvarez Bravo, Rosalba Carriera, Mary Cassatt, Elizabeth Catlett, Judy Chicago, Camille Claudel, Louisa Courtauld, Petah Coyne, Louise Dahl-Wolfe, Elaine de Kooning, Lesley Dill, Helen Frankenthaler, Sonia Gechtoff, Marguerite Gérard, Nan Goldin, Nancy Graves, Grace Hartigan, Frida Kahlo, Angelica Kauffman, Käthe Kollwitz, Lee Krasner, Justine Kurland, Bettye Lane, Marie Laurencin, Hung Liu, Judith Leyster, Maria Martinez, Maria Sibylla Merian, Evelyn Metzger, Joan Mitchell, Gabriele Münter, Elizabeth Murray, Alice Neel, Louise Nevelson, Sarah Miriam Peale, Clara Peeters, Lilla Cabot Perry, Jaune Quick-to-See Smith, Mary Troby, Rachel Ruysch, Elisabetta Sirani, Joan Snyder, Lilly Martin Spencer, Alma Thomas, Suzanne Valadon, Amy Sherald, and Élisabeth-Louise Vigée-Le Brun.

== Betty Boyd Dettre Library and Research Center ==
The Betty Boyd Dettre Library and Research Center (LRC) provides researchers with information about women visual artists from all time periods and nationalities. It is open to scholars, students, researchers, curators, museum professionals, and the general public. The LRC collection includes 18,500 volumes of books and exhibition catalogues, 50 periodical titles, and research files on 18,000 individual women artists. These files include resumes, correspondence, reproductions, articles, and other ephemeral materials. The Arts and Entertainment Network Media Library holds approximately 500 videos, DVDs, audio tapes, and other audiovisual materials, including examples of video art, interviews with women artists, documentaries, and films directed by women.

Also available to researchers are The Nelleke Nix and Marianne Huber Collection: The Frida Kahlo Papers consists of more than 360 unpublished letters, postcards, notes, clippings, printed matter, and drawings relating to the artist's life and work. The LRC also holds artist Judy Chicago's visual archives.

In spring 2007, the LRC launched "Clara: Database of Women Artists," a user-friendly searchable interface for biographic information on close to 18,000 historic and contemporary women artists from around the world. Since integrated within the NMWA website, Clara has been decommissioned and is in the process of being moved.

== Exhibitions ==
Beginning in 1987 with American Women Artists, 1830–1930, NMWA has presented more than 200 exhibitions, including:

- Women Artists from Antwerp to Amsterdam, 1600-1750 (09/26/2025-01/11/2026), curated by Virginia Treanor and Frederica Van Dam
- Sonya Clark: Tatter, Bristle, and Mend (3/3/2021–6/27/2021)
- Judy Chicago—The End: A Meditation on Death and Extinction (9/19/2019–1/20/2020)
- Rodarte (11/10/2018–2/10/2019)
- Women House (3/9/2018–5/28/2018)
- Magnetic Fields: Expanding American Abstraction, 1960s to Today (10/13/2017–1/21/2018)
- She Who Tells a Story: Women Photographers from Iran and the Arab World (4/8/2016–7/31/2016)
- Picturing Mary: Woman, Mother, Idea (12/5/2014–4/12/2015)
- Royalists to Romantics: Women Artists from the Louvre, Versailles, and Other French National Collections (2/24/2012–7/29/2012)
- Women Who Rock: Vision, Passion, Power (9/7/2012–1/6/2013)
- Loïs Mailou Jones: A Life in Vibrant Color (10/9/2010–1/9/2011)
- WACK! Art and the Feminist Revolution (9/21/2007–12/16/2007)
- Dreaming Their Way: Australian Aboriginal Women (6/30/2006–9/24/2006)
- An Imperial Collection: Women Artists from the State Hermitage Museum (2/14/ 2003 – 6/18/2003)
- Places of Their Own: Emily Carr, Georgia O'Keeffe, and Frida Kahlo (2/8/2002–5/12/2002)
- Julie Taymor: Playing With Fire (11/16/2000–2/4/2001)
- The Magic of Remedios Varo (2/10/2000–5/29/2000)
- Women to Watch (ongoing)

The Women to Watch exhibition series is a collaboration between NMWA and its national and international committees. These exhibitions, which take place every few years, feature artists from the committees' regions and focus on a specific medium or theme chosen by NMWA's curators.

== Murals ==
In 2020 and again in 2022, NMWA commissioned artists to paint murals on plywood covering the museum's facade while it was under construction.

- Lookout: MISS CHELOVE, Artist: Miss Chelove (Cita Sadeli), (3/15/2022-9/15/2022)
- Unnamed mural, Artist: Trap Bob (Tenbeete Solomon), (2020)
- Unnamed mural, Artist: Quest Skinner, (2020)

== Public programs ==
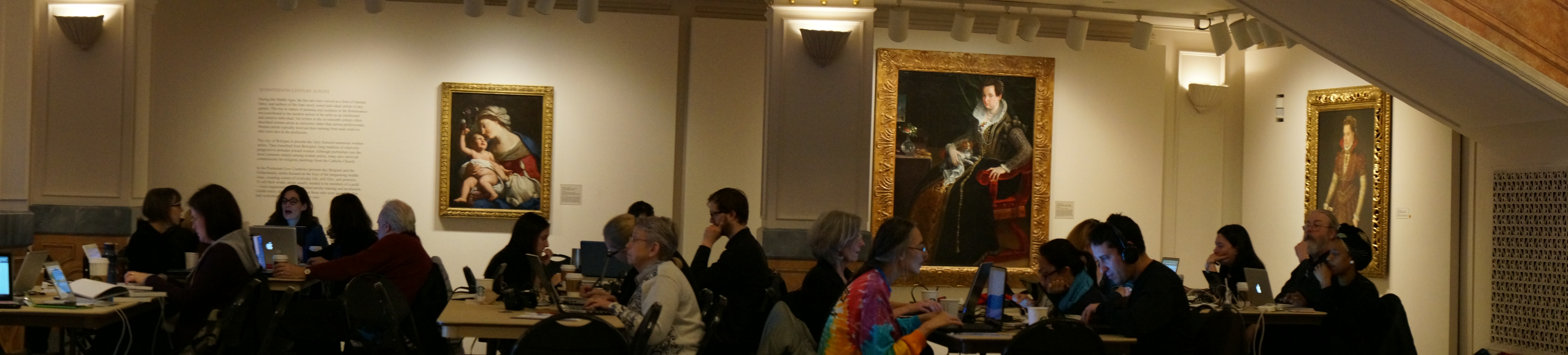
Wikipedia edit-a-thon held at the museum in 2014

The museum presents public programs including hands-on workshops, artist conversations, gallery talks, art history lectures, and tours. NMWA offers arts-integration teacher training through its Art, Books, and Creativity (ABC) curriculum.

The museum's Women, Arts, and Social Change (WASC) initiative aims to facilitate conversations about social and political issues affecting women. The initiative's Fresh Talk series invites the public to converse with women in the arts as well as other fields.

== Outreach committees ==
The museum created its network of national and international committees in 1984. As of 2022, there are 28 outreach committees with over 3,000 members in the United States and around the world. The committees promote the museum's mission, advocate for regional women artists, and serve as NMWA ambassadors. The committees also helps to present the museum's Women to Watch exhibition series which features emerging or underrepresented artists from the states and countries where committees exist.

== Operations ==
The museum is located at 1250 New York Avenue and H Street N.W. The closest Washington Metro stations are Metro Center or McPherson Square stations. The museum is open Tuesday to Sunday 10 a.m. to 5 p.m. Admission is $16 for adults, $13 for adults 65+, students and educators, veterans, Native tribal members, and D.C. residents, and free for members, visitors 21 and under, and visitors with disabilities. Admission is free to all on the first Sunday and second Wednesday of every month. The museum shop shares the same hours as the museum.

== See also ==
- New Hall Art Collection
- Women artists
