= Mary Troby =

English silversmith

Mary Troby was an English silversmith.

Troby was the widow of silversmith John Troby. She registered her mark on 17 December 1804 and remained active until around 1808. Classed as a smallworker, she lived at 2 Ship Court, Old Bailey. With her husband she had three children including William Troby, also active as a silversmith.

A George III centerpiece by Troby, dating to 1808, is in the collection of the National Museum of Women in the Arts.
