= Bolivian sol =

sol boliviano (Spanish)

Denominations
- Superunit
- 16: Escudo
- Coins: 1/4, 1/2, 1, 2, 4, 8 soles 1/2, 1, 2, 4, 8 scudos

Demographics
- Date of introduction: 1827
- Replaced: Spanish colonial real
- Date of withdrawal: 1864
- Replaced by: Bolivian boliviano
- User(s): Bolivia

Valuation
- Value: 8 soles = 1 boliviano
- This infobox shows the latest status before this currency was rendered obsolete.

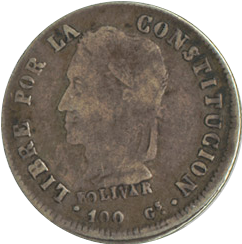

The sol was the currency of Bolivia between 1827 and 1864. There were no subdivisions of the sol but 16 soles were equal to 1 escudo. The sol replaced the real at par and was replaced by the boliviano at a rate of 8 soles = 1 boliviano. Only coins were issued.

== Coins ==
In 1827, silver 1/2, 1, 2, 4 and 8 soles were introduced. These were followed by gold 1 and 8 scudos in 1831 and 1/2, 2 and 4 scudos in 1834. Silver 1/4 sol coins were issued in 1852 and 1853.
