= Marcelo Zabalaga =

Bolivian economist

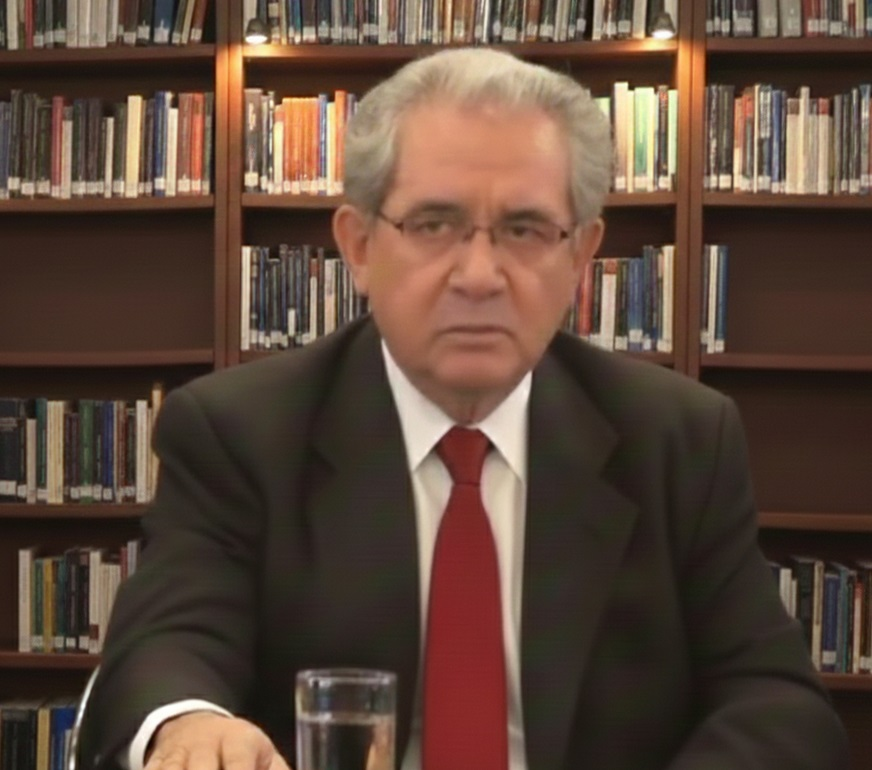

Governor of the Central Bank of Bolivia
- In office 2010–2017

Personal details
- Born: 1 August 1953 (age 72)
- Occupation: economist
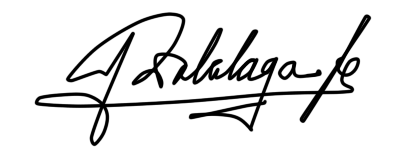
- Signature

Marcelo Zabalaga Estrada (born 1 August 1953 in Cochabamba) is a Bolivian economist. He was the governor of the Central Bank of Bolivia (Banco Central de Bolivia - BCB) from 2010 to 2017. He took over after Gabriel Loza Tellería.

Zabalaga holds a bachelor's degree in economics from the University of Geneva and a master's degree in development studies in 1977 from the Graduate Institute of International and Development Studies. He later also took obtained two other master's degrees; in social sciences and in banking (Gerencia de Banca Corporativa), both of which he pursued in Bolivia.

He has worked and advised in Bolivia, Peru, Colombia, Brazil, Panama, Honduras, Nicaragua, Mexico, Spain and Switzerland, in areas such as education, social housing, microfinance, pension funds and financial regulations.

Before joining the central bank, he led several different companies, including the foundation FADES (Foundation for Alternatives in Development), FINRURAL (Association of Financial Institutions for Rural Development), the pension funds AFP Futuro in Bolivia, Colfondos in Colombia and Siembra in Argentina. He has led FOLADE (Latin American Development Fund) in Costa Rica, PRODEL (Local Development Program) in Nicaragua and Asociación pro Banca Ética and Argentaria International in Spain.

In 2007, he was appointed supervisor of the banks and financial institutions of Bolivia, today known as the Autoridad del Sistema Financiero (ASFI). He held this position until 2009.

== Cryptocurrencies ban ==
In 2014, Marcelo Zabalaga signed a controversial bill to ban cryptocurrencies. Following the controversy over the decision, legal challenges for the reconsideration of the law were mounted, claiming draconian and backward policy making had led Bolivia to remain behind peers in the blockchain space.
