= Evelyn Metzger =

American modernist painter (1911–2007)

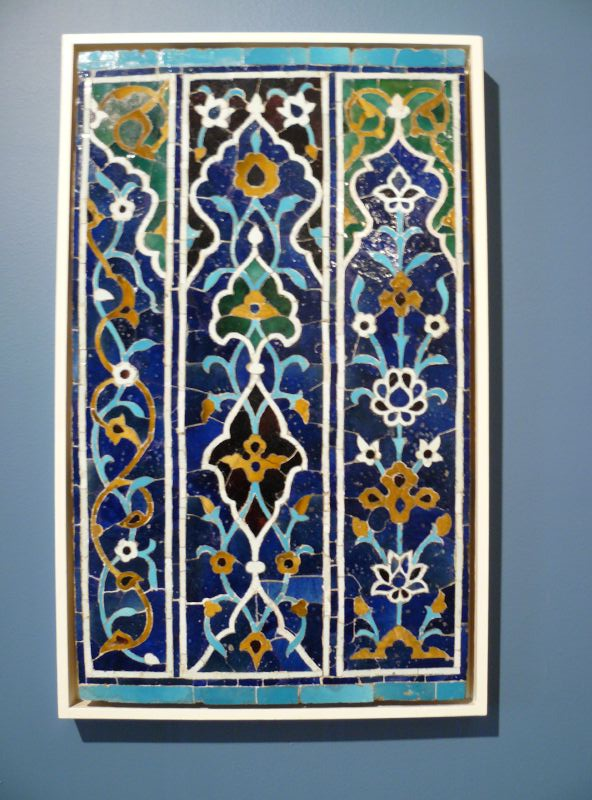
Ceramic tile gifted by Metzger to the Brooklyn Museum

Evelyn Borchard Metzger (1911 - 2007) was an American modernist painter.

== Life ==
Metzger was born in New York City in 1911. She studied at the Art Students League of New York with George Bridgman. She graduated from Vassar College; then she studied with Sally James Farnham and George Grosz, and Raphael Soyer.

She lived in South America for many years, where she worked with Bolivian painter Cecilio Guzmán de Rojas.

She participated in numerous group shows in museums and held several solo shows. She had exhibitions at Gallerie Bellechasse, Papillon Gallery, Palmer Gallery, and Johnson Museum of Art. Her works are in the National Museum of Women in the Arts collection. She donated artwork to the Metropolitan Museum of Art. and Brooklyn Museum.
