= Alejo Calatayud =

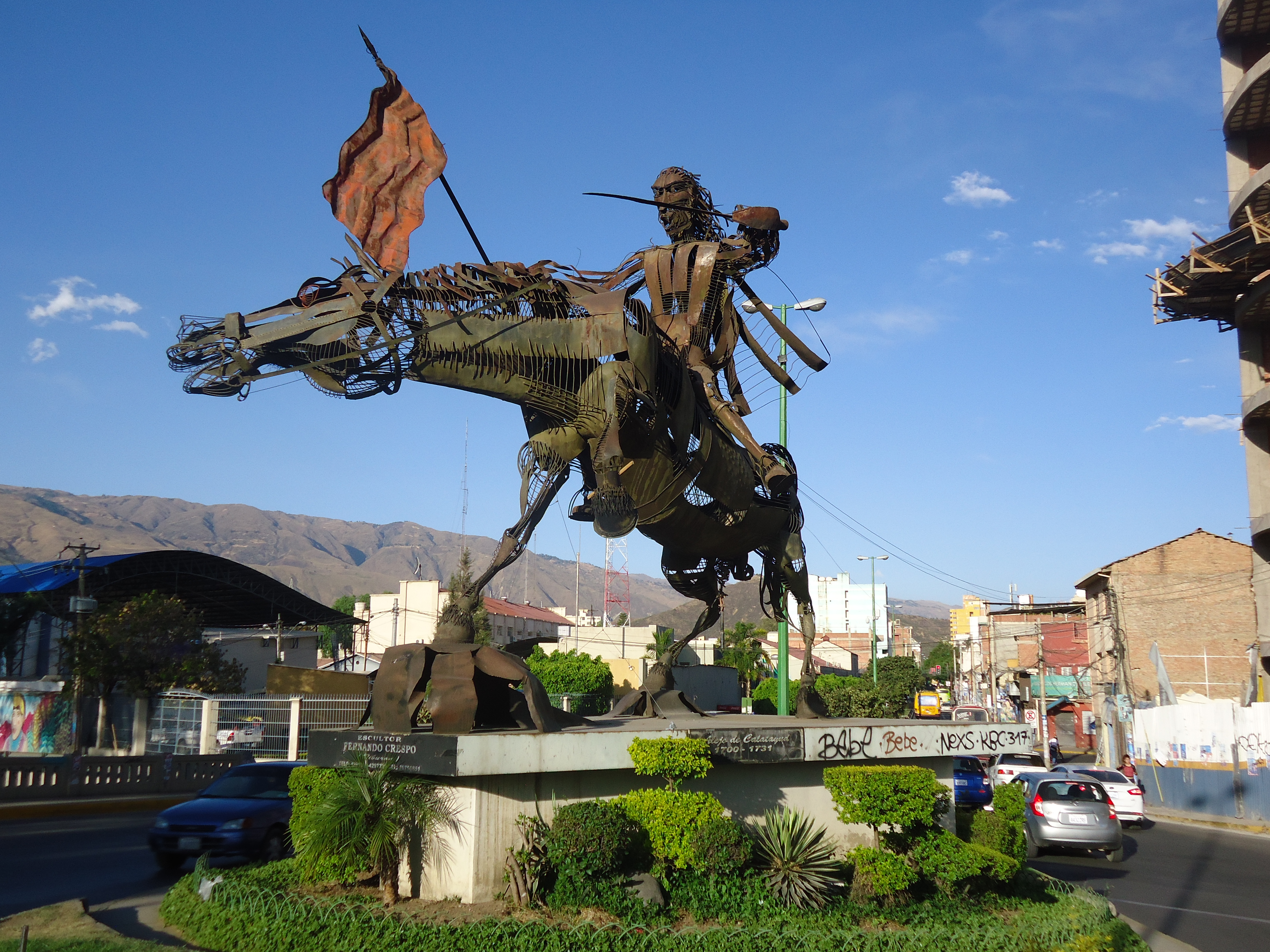
Statue of Alejo Calatayud in Cochabamba

Alejo Calatayud (c. 1705 – January 31, 1731) was a Mestizo silversmith from Oropesa, Cochabamba province in present-day Bolivia. In 1730 Calatayud led a violent rebellion, and became a local hero amongst the plebeian masses of the province.

Calatayud belonged to the sector of educated Mestizos, and was a member of the silversmiths' guild. On December 1, 1730, he led a rebellion in Oropesa, in response to rumours that an official named Manuel Benero de Belaro had been sent to ensure that the Mestizos paid the same punitive taxes as the indigenous population. Calatayud was twenty-five years old at the time. The rebellion united the Mestizos and the indigenous people and spread to the entire Cochabamba province. The provincial capital was surrounded and seized by Calatayud's forces.

The 1730 rebellion was characterized by an intersection of ethnic and class conflicts. The rebels ransacked shops and houses and killed 39 Spanish inhabitants of the town. However, once the clergy took to the streets with the sacrament the Mestizo rebels stopped further bloodshed. Two representatives of the creole elite were elected as magistrates. Because the insurgency was badly organized it could not withstand the counter-attack organized by the creole elite (actioned by the magistrates of Cochabamba). A force led by Rodrígez Carrasco captured and decapitated Calatayud, sending his head to the Royal Audience of Charcas. Rodrígez Carrasco also issued death warrants against twenty-two of Calatayud's followers.

The revolt led by Calatayud was important for the political development in the area, as it marked the start of a series of revolts that lasted for half a century.
