= Iván Guzmán de Rojas =

Bolivian mathematician and scientist (1934–2022)

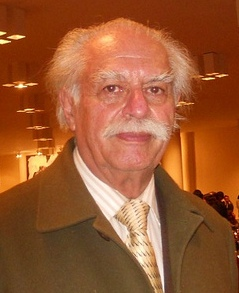
- Guzmán in 2009
- Born: 30 March 1934; La Paz, Bolivia
- Died: 26 January 2022 (aged 87)
- Occupation: Scientist

Iván Guzmán de Rojas (30 March 1934 – 26 January 2022) was a Bolivian artist, mathematician, and scientist, noted for the creation of the multilingual translation system Atamiri.

== Early life and academia ==
Guzmán was born in La Paz, Bolivia in 1934 to a painter from Potosí, Cecilio Guzmán de Rojas. He studied at an American institute in the city and graduated in 1952. While in high school, he became interested in science, primarily mathematics and physics.

He studied engineering at the Higher University of San Andrés and won a research scholarship to Germany. He remained in Europe for about ten years to deepen his knowledge of theoretical physics, a branch of physics which applies mathematical models. Following his return to Bolivia in 1967, he promoted the establishment of a major of Basic Sciences at the Higher University of San Andrés. He is the founder of the majors of Mathematics, Physics, and Chemistry at the school and created the first research laboratory of applied chemistry.

At the beginning of the 1970s, Guzmán left his academic career due to the University Revolution of 1970 and Hugo Banzer's military coup.

== Linguistic research ==
In 1979, Guzmán began to study the algorithmic properties of the syntax of the Aymara language. This research led to the development of the Atamiri System, software, based on the language, that allows multilingual translation of languages simultaneously.

In 1985, under the oversight of the Secretary General of the Organization of American States, João Clemente Baena Soares, Guzmán presented the first prototype of the Atamiri System in Washington, DC. By this time, it was able to simultaneously translate from English into French, Spanish, and German and from Spanish into French, English, and German.

Guzmán gave presentations and seminars in various countries around the world about his investigation of the engineering of language and the application of the Aymara language on Atamiri. He also wrote various publications in respect to the language.

Guzmán led a research group called IGRAL, which investigated language engineering. The group began more work on the Atamiri system in 2001 and created Qopuchawi, a multilingual messaging service with translations into 30 different languages.

In 2007, he wrote the book Lógica aymara y futurología, in which he referred to an algebraic tool applied to the computation which permits the imagination of a future scenario developed using his study of Aymara.

== Other positions ==
Between 1989 and 1999 he served as the vice-president of the National Electoral Court of Bolivia.

== Death ==
Guzmán died on 26 January 2022, at the age of 87.

== Published works ==
- 500 años America Latina: Ciclo de conferencias, 1973
- El niño vs. el número, Última Hora, 1979
- Problemática lógico-lingüística de la comunicación social con el pueblo aymara, Centro Internacional de Investigaciones para el Desarrollo, 1982
- Logical and linguistic problems of social communication with the aymara people, International Development Research Centre (Estados Unidos), 1985
- Problèmes de logique et de linguistique qui entravent la communication sociale avec le peuple aymara, Centre de recherches pour le développement international (Canada), 1985
- Lógica aymara y futurología, Imprenta "Santin" Offset Color, 2007
