= Genoveva Ríos =

Bolivian hero (born 1865)

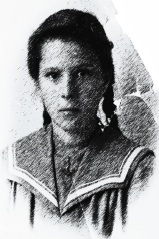
- Born: 1865; Bolivia
- Died: Cochabamba

Genoveva Ríos (born 1865) was a Bolivian hero. She defended the Bolivian flag during an invasion by Chile in 1879.

== Life ==
Ríos was born in Antofagasta in what was then Bolivia in 1865. She came to notice in 1879 at the outbreak of the War of the Pacific. Her town was invaded by Chile on 14 February. Her father had a senior position in the local police. Ríos noticed that the soldiers were seizing flags. She took a Bolivian flag, hid it from the soldiers, and took it to her parents. Her act was reported in the newspaper on 28 February.

Ríos died in Cochabamba but the year is unknown. Ríos's story is still reported as an example or heroism. Her town is now part of Chile.

== Impact on Bolivian history ==
Genoveva Ríos' actions during the War of the Pacific (1879-1880) had a significant impact on Bolivian history. Her courageous defense of the Bolivian flag in the face of the Chilean invasion demonstrated her patriotism and bravery. Some of the key impacts of her actions include:

Ríos' act of hiding the Bolivian flag from the Chilean soldiers and keeping it safe until her parents rescued it, symbolized the determination of the Bolivian people to resist the invasion.

Her story was reported in newspapers, which helped to raise awareness about the war and the efforts of Bolivians to defend their country.

The bravery of Genoveva Ríos has inspired many Bolivians, and her actions continue to be celebrated today. Several educational institutions have been named in her honor, ensuring that her legacy lives on and serves as an example of courage and patriotism for future generations.

Ríos' actions were recognized by the Chilean consul, who offered her compensation for her efforts. This diplomatic gesture highlighted the importance of her actions and helped to establish a connection between the two countries.

Overall, Genoveva Ríos' actions during the War of the Pacific played a crucial role in shaping Bolivian history, as they exemplified the resilience and patriotism of the Bolivian people in the face of adversity.
