= Cecilio Guzmán de Rojas =

Bolivian painter (1899–1950)

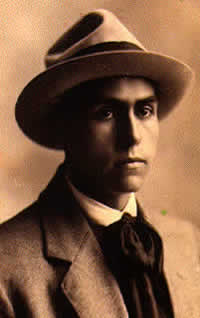
- Born: 24 October 1899; Potosí, Bolivia
- Died: 14 February 1950 (aged 50); La Paz, Bolivia
- Education: Avelino Nogales; Julio Romero de Torres
- Notable work: Self-portrait (1919) The Triumph of Nature (1928) The Kiss of the Idol (1929) Inca Princess (1931)

Cecilio Guzmán de Rojas (24 October 1899 (Note: some biographers say he was born in 1900) – 14 February 1950) was a Bolivian painter and a leader of the indigenous art movement. He is considered Bolivia's preeminent artist from the first half of the 20th century.

== Life ==
Guzmán de Rojas was born in Potosí, Bolivia. His father, Cecilio Guzmán Blanco, was a Spanish teacher from Cochabamba, and his mother, Justa Rojas, loved painting and instilled him with an artistic sensibility from a young age.

When he was 12 years old, his family moved to Cochabamba, where he became a student of Avelino Nogales and George Mattewie, and by the age of 19, he became skilled enough to produce a series of oil paintings, including his first self-portrait, in which he is depicted smoking, wearing a rose in his lapel and a bowler hat; the painting is considered to be in the style of the decadent movement.

He went to Spain in 1921, (Note: Some sources say 1919) where, in most accounts, he received a scholarship to the Royal Academy of Fine Arts of San Fernando. Some sources, however, say that his trip was financed by his family, which had recently become wealthy. In Spain, he studied with Julio Romero de Torres, José Moreno Carbonero, and Manuel Benedito. During his time there, he made reproductions of Spanish Golden Age painters. Later he traveled to Paris and enrolled in the Arts et Métiers ParisTech, where he studied impressionism and cubism.

In 1929, Guzmán de Rojas returned to La Paz, Bolivia, where he took a job as director of the Academy of Fine Arts and lecturer. He became a public figure and leader of the Bolivian indigenous art movement at this time, and was known for mixing Art Nouveau and Art Deco styles with Indigenist imagery.

Guzmán de Rojas taught the American modernist painter Evelyn Metzger, while she was living in South America.

He was the father of the noted mathematician, scientist and linguist Iván Guzmán de Rojas.

He died by suicide in the bucolic landscape of Llojeta, La Paz, shooting himself twice in the chest. He did not leave a suicide note, and it is not known for certain why he took his own life.

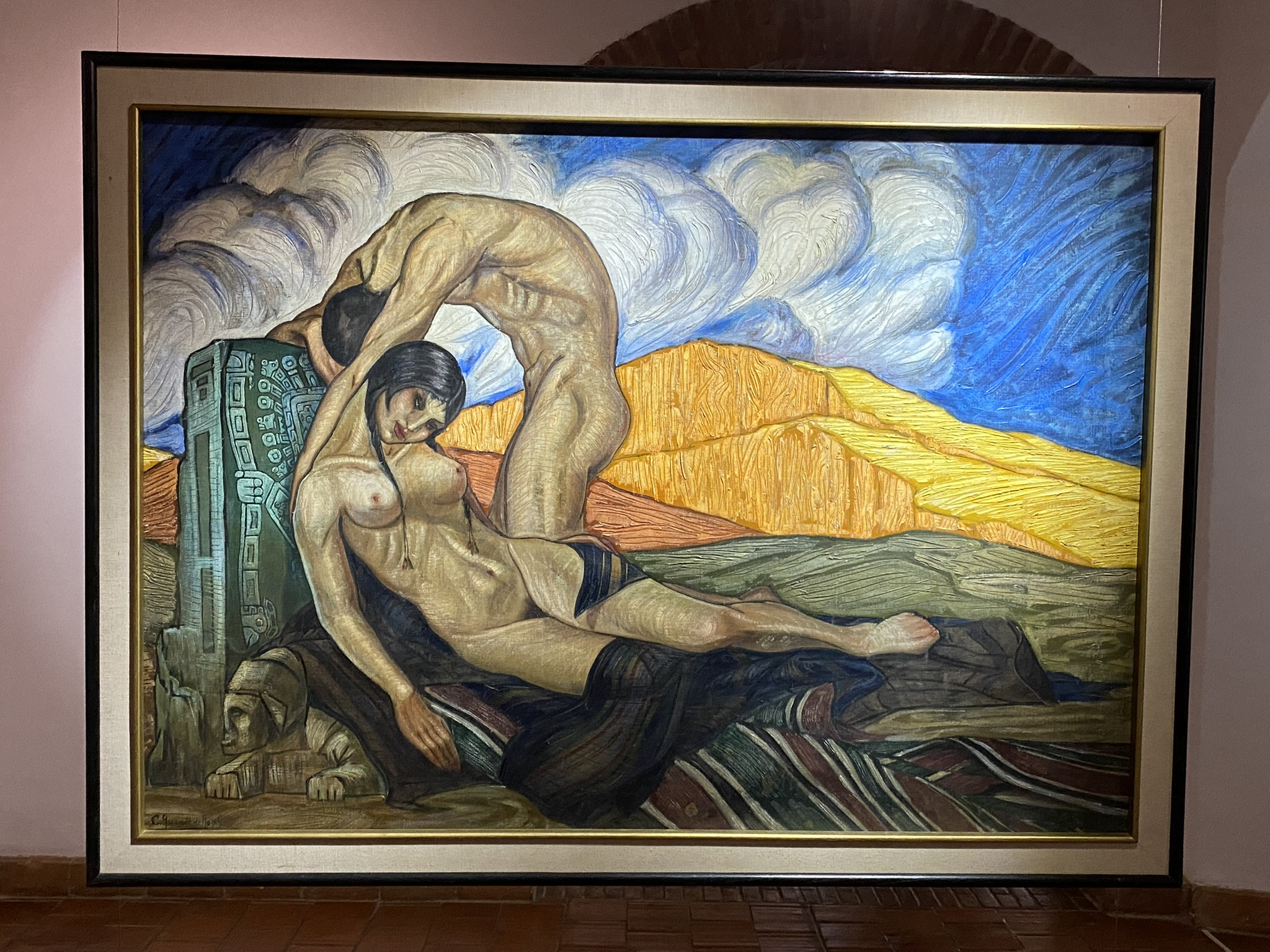
The Triumph of Nature (Spanish: El Triunfo de la Naturaleza) by Cecilio Guzmán de Rojas (1928)

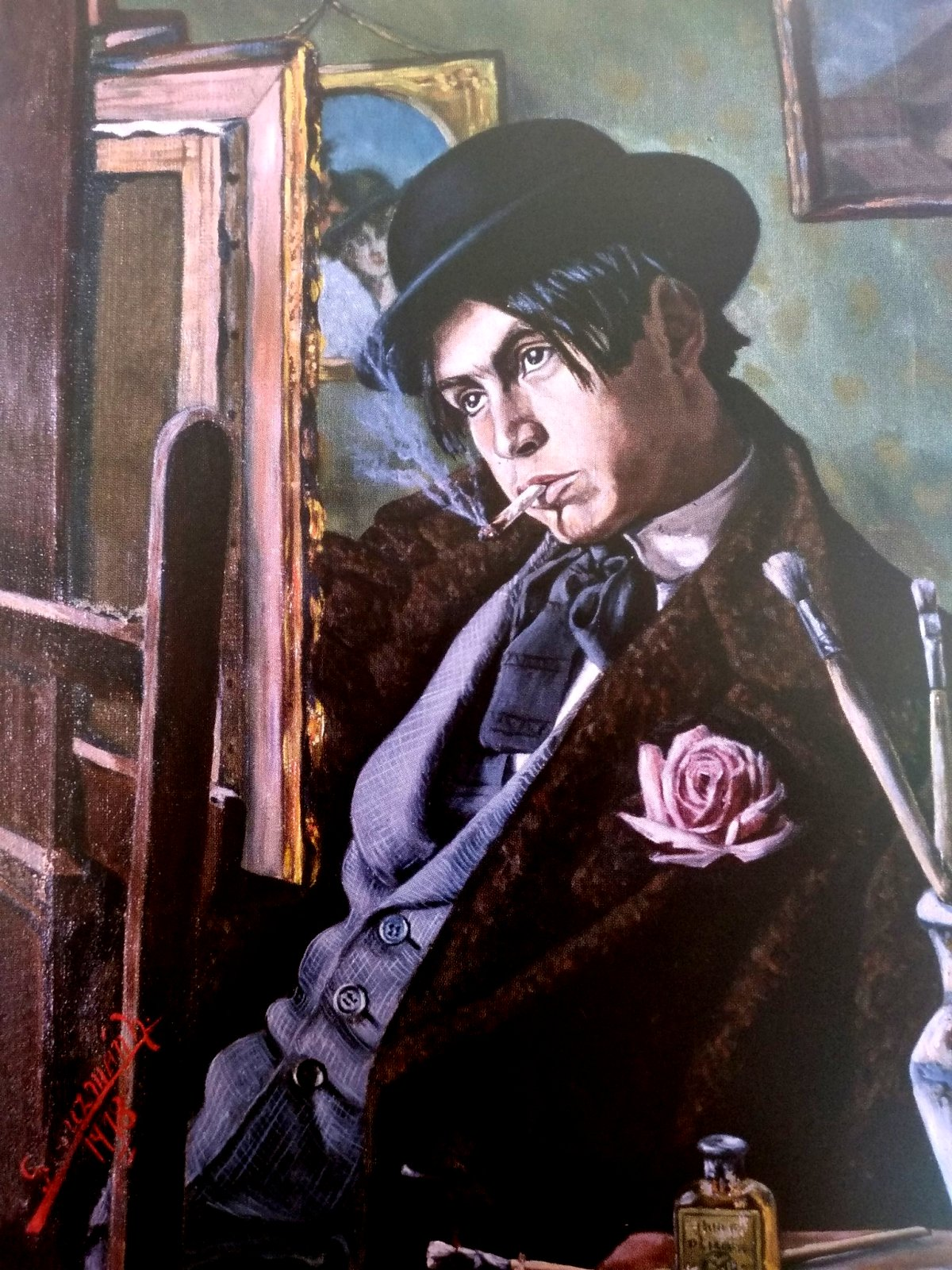
Self portrait at the age of 19 (1919)
