= Central Bank of Bolivia =

Monetary Authority of Bolivia

Coordinates: 16°29′50″S 68°08′04″W

Central Bank of Bolivia Banco Central de Bolivia (in Spanish)
- Logo
- Headquarters: La Paz, Bolivia
- Established: 20 July 1928; 97 years ago
- Ownership: 100% state ownership
- President: Roger Edwin Rojas Ulo
- Central bank of: Bolivia
- Currency: Bolivian boliviano BOB (ISO 4217)
- Reserves: 2 087 million USD
- Website: www.bcb.gob.bo

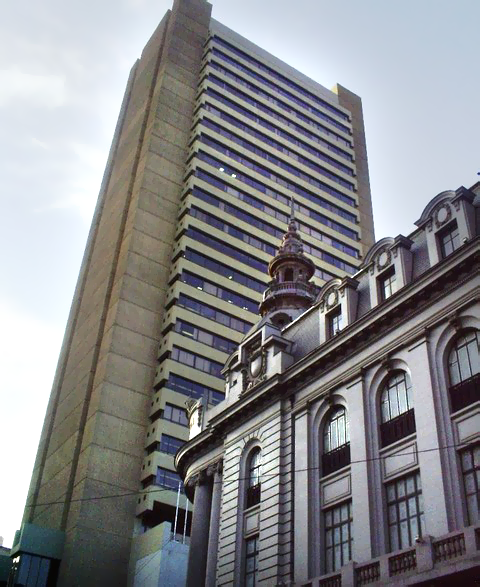
The Banco Central de Bolivia building in La Paz

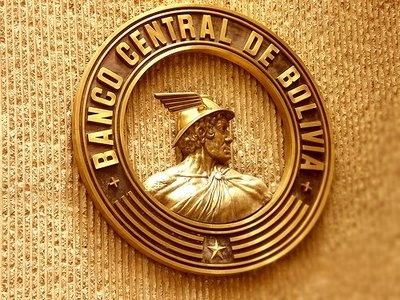
Banco Central de Bolivia logo

The Central Bank of Bolivia (Spanish: Banco Central de Bolivia) is the central bank of Bolivia, responsible for monetary policy and the issuance of banknotes. The current president of the BCB is Pablo Ramos Sánchez.

== History ==
The bank was established by Law 632, passed on July 20, 1928. On April 20, 1929, its name was changed to Banco Central de Bolivia, and on July 1, 1929, the bank officially began operations.

== Presidents ==
- Roger Edwin Rojas Ulo, since 2020
- Agustín Saavedra Weise, 2020
- Guillermo Aponte, 2019–2020
- Pablo Ramos Sánchez, 2017–2019
- Marcelo Zabalaga, 2010–2016
- Gabriel Loza Tellería, 2008–2010
- Raúl Garrón Claure, 2006–2008
- Juan Antonio Morales, 1996–2006
- Fernando Candia Castillo, 1993–1995
- Armando Méndez Morales, 1992–1993
- Raúl Boada Rodríguez, 1989–1992
- Jacques Trigo Loubiere, 1988–1989
- Javier Nogales Iturri, 1986–1988
- René Gómez García, 1985–1986
- Tamara Sánchez Peña, 1985
- Reynaldo Cardozo Arellano, 1984–1985
- Marcelo Zalles Barriga, 1984
- Herbert Müller Costas, 1983–1984
- Luis Viscarra Cruz, 1982–1983
- Gonzalo Ruiz Ballivián, 1982
- Guido Salinas, 1981
- Marcelo Montero Nuñez del Prado, 1980–1981
- Enrique García Ayaviri, 1979
- Miguel Fabbri Cohn, 1978–1979
- José Justiniano Aguilera, 1977–1978
- Luis Bedregal Rodo, 1972
- Manuel Mercado Montero, 1971–1972
- Arturo Nuñez del Prado, 1971
- Wenceslao Alba Quiroz, 1970–1971
- Oscar Vega López, 1969–1970
- Jorge Jordán Ferrufino, 1967–1969
- Ivan Anaya Oblitas, 1966–1967
- Luis Arce Pacheco, 1966
- Alberto Ibañez Gonzales, 1965–1966
- Santiago Sologuren Sologuren, 1964–1965
- Raúl Lema Pelaez, 1963–1965
- Humberto Fossati Rocha, 1961–1963
- Eufronio Hinojosa Guzmán, 1960–1961
- Luis Peñaloza Cordero, 1957–1960
- Franklin Antezana Paz, 1954–1957
- Armando Pinell Centellas, 1952–1954
- Humberto Cuenca de la Riva, 1951–1952
- Alcides Molina, 1950–1951
- José María Gutiérrez, 1949–1950
- Alfredo Alexander Jordán, 1946–1949
- Alberto Mendieta Alvarez, 1946
- Arturo Taborga Ramos, 1943–1944
- Gabriel Gosálvez, 1940–1941
- Armando Pacheco Iturralde, 1939–1940
- Carlos Hanhart Siemon, 1939
- Manuel Carrasco Jiménez, 1938–1939
- Casto Rojas Bautista, 1937–1938
- Victor Muñoz Reyes, 1936–1937
- Luis Calvo Calvimontes, 1935–1936
- Ismael Montes, 1931–1933
- Juan Perou Cusicanqui, 1931
- Daniel Sánchez Bustamante, 1928–1930

== See also ==
- Ministry of Economy and Public Finance (Bolivia)
- Bolivian boliviano
- Economy of Bolivia
- List of central banks
