= Economy of Bolivia =

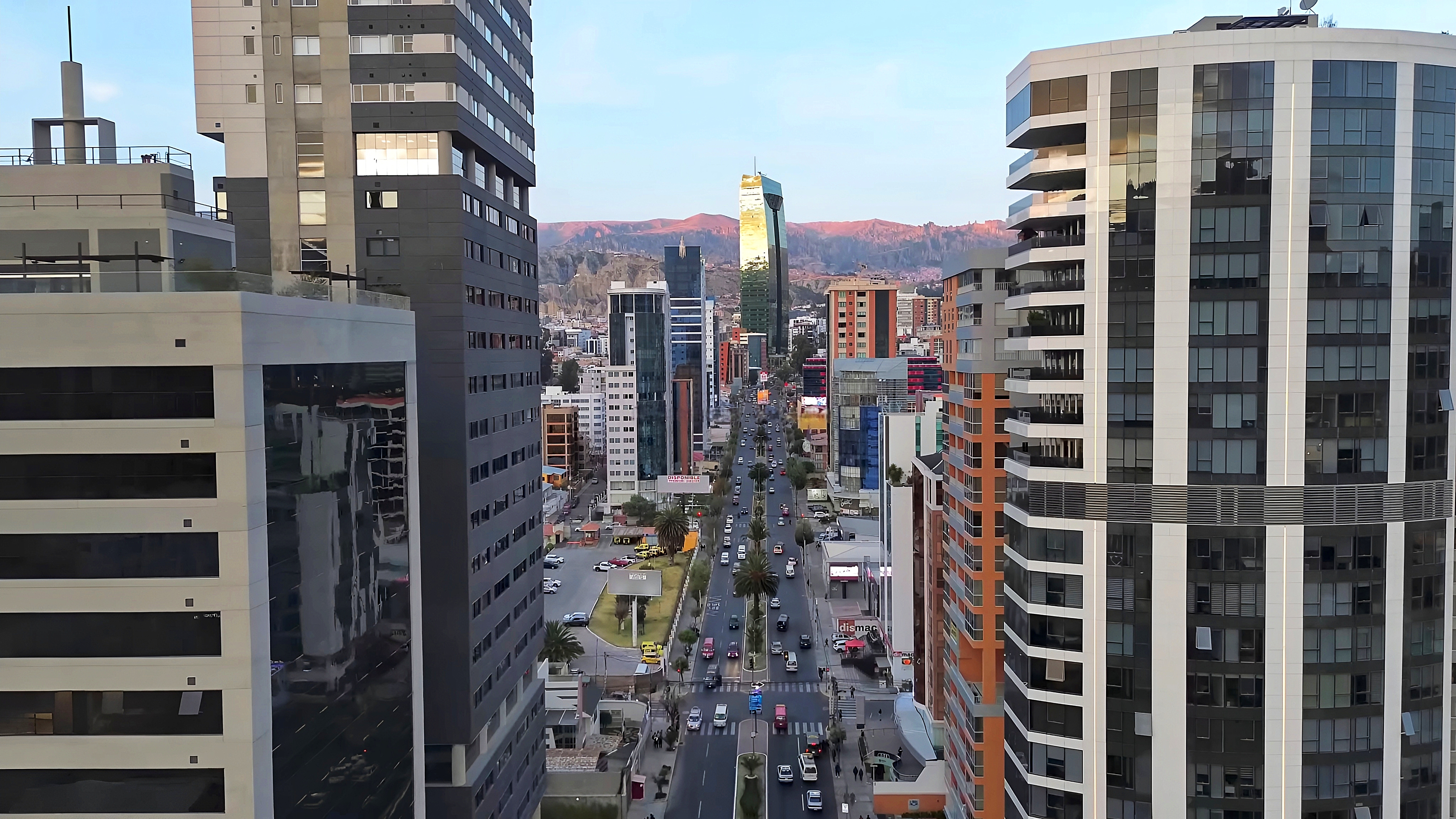
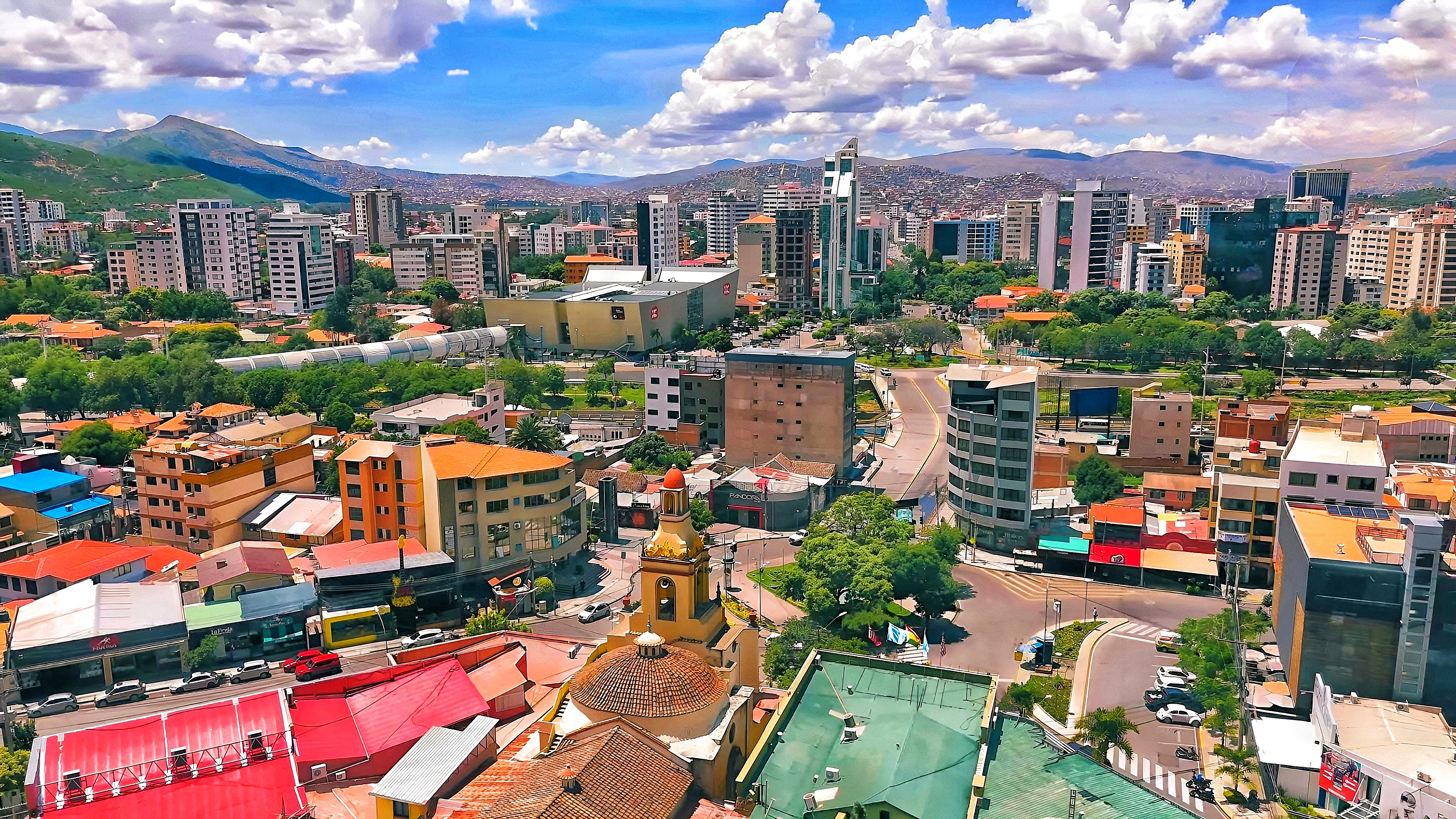
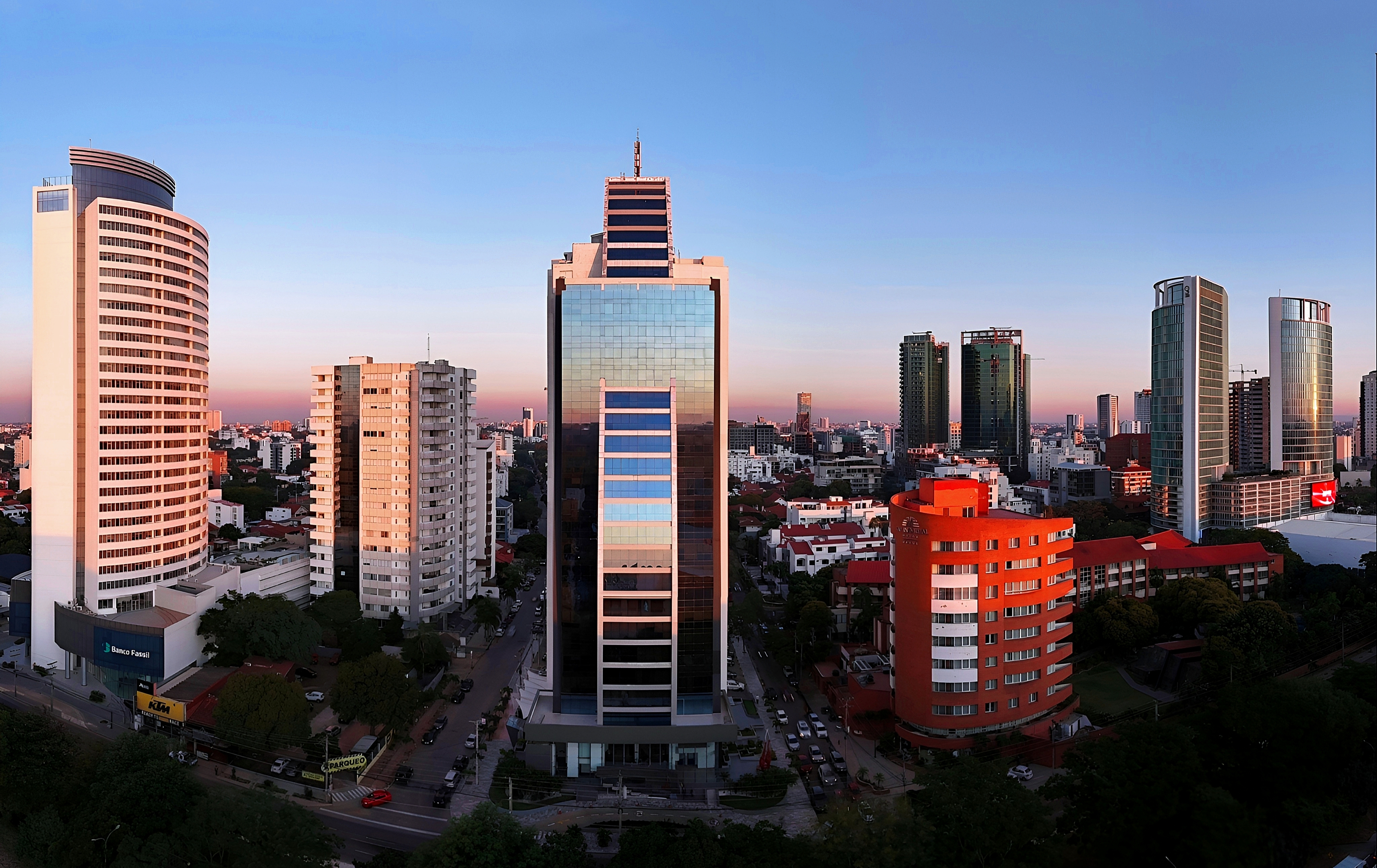
- La Paz, the capital of Bolivia. Cochabamba, the "breadbasket city" of Bolivia. Santa Cruz de la Sierra, the economic center of Bolivia.
- Currency: Bolivian Boliviano (BOB)
- Fiscal year: Calendar year
- Trade organizations: WTO, CAN, UNASUR, Mercosur
- Country group: Developing/Emerging; Lower-middle income economy

Statistics
- Population: ▲12,290,945 (2024)
- GDP: ▲$80.74 billion (nominal; 2026); ▲$161.8 billion (PPP; 2026)
- GDP rank: 86th (nominal; 2026); 89th (PPP; 2026)
- GDP growth: ▼ –3.3% (2026f)
- GDP per capita: ▲$6,333 (nominal; 2026f); ▲$12,692 (PPP; 2026f)
- GDP per capita rank: 114th (nominal; 2026); 121st (PPP; 2026)
- GDP per capita growth: ▼ -2.5% (2024)
- GDP by sector: agriculture: 13.8%; industry: 37.8%; services: 48.2%; (2017 est.)
- Inflation (CPI): 26.1% (2026f)
- Population below national poverty line: ▼36.5% (2023); ▼5% on less than $4.20/day (2023)
- Gini coefficient: ▲42.1 medium (2023)
- Human Development Index: ▲0.733 high (2023) (120th); ▲0.578 medium IHDI (99th) (2023)
- Labor force: ▲5,423,333 (2019); ▲69.3% employment rate (2018)
- Labor force by occupation: agriculture: 29.4%; industry: 22%; services: 48.6%; (2015 est.)
- Unemployment: 4% (2017 est.); note: data are for urban areas; widespread underemployment
- Youth unemployment: 5% (2025)
- Main industries: mining, smelting, petroleum, food and beverages, tobacco, handicrafts, clothing, jewelry

External
- Exports: ▼$9.05 billion (2024)
- Export goods: Natural gas, gold, zinc, silver, lead, tin, soybeans and derivatives (soybean meal and soybean oil), brazil nut, urea, quinoa
- Main export partners: Mercosur 23.8%; Brazil 17%; Argentina 5.9%; Paraguay 0.86%; China 15.55%; Peru 7.07%; Colombia 5.75%; UAE 5.35%; Belgium 4.16%; India 4.15%; Japan 3.93% (2024)
- Imports: ▼$9.89 billion (2024)
- Import goods: machinery, petroleum products, vehicles, iron and steel, plastics
- Main import partners: Mercosur 26.1%; Brazil 13.65%; Argentina 10.51%; Paraguay 1.08%; Uruguay 0.85%; China 22.27%; Chile 10.36%; United States 8.43%; Peru 6.87%; Belgium 2.8%; Japan 1.97% (2024)
- FDI stock: ▲$12.31 billion (31 December 2017 est.); Abroad: $0 (31 December 2017 est.)
- Current account: ▼ −$2.375 billion (2017 est.)
- Gross external debt: ▲$12.81 billion (31 December 2017 est.)

Public finance
- Government debt: ▼24.5% of GDP (2019 est.) (Note: data cover general government debt, and includes debt instruments issued by government entities other than the treasury; the data include treasury debt held by foreign entities; the data include debt issued by subnational entities)
- Foreign reserves: ▲$10.26 billion (31 December 2017 est.)
- Budget balance: −7.8% (of GDP) (2017 est.)
- Revenue: 15.09 billion (2017 est.)
- Spending: 18.02 billion (2017 est.)
- Economic aid: recipient: $726 million (2009 est.)
- Credit rating: B+ (Domestic); B+ (Foreign); B+ (T&C Assessment) (Standard & Poor's)
- All values, unless otherwise stated, are in US dollars.

The economy of Bolivia is the 89th-largest in the world in nominal terms and the 90th-largest in purchasing power parity. Bolivia is classified by the World Bank to be a lower middle income country. With a Human Development Index of 0.703, it is ranked 114th (high human development). Driven largely by its natural resources, Bolivia has become a region leader in measures of economic growth, fiscal stability and foreign reserves, although it remains a historically poor country. The Bolivian economy has had a historic single-commodity focus. From silver to tin to coca, Bolivia has enjoyed only occasional periods of economic diversification. Political instability and difficult topography have constrained efforts to modernize the agricultural sector. Similarly, relatively low population growth coupled with low life expectancy has kept the labor supply in flux and prevented industries from flourishing. Rampant inflation and corruption previously created development challenges, but in the early twenty-first century the fundamentals of its economy showed unexpected improvement, leading Moody's Investors Service to upgrade Bolivia's economic rating in 2010 from B2 to B1. The mining industry, especially the extraction of natural gas and zinc, currently dominates Bolivia's export economy.

Between 2006 and 2019 (term of the presidency of the democratic socialist Evo Morales), GDP per capita doubled and the extreme poverty rate declined from 38% to 18%. The poverty rate declined from 22.23% in 2000 to 12.38% in 2010. Moreover, the Gini coefficient declined from 0.60 to 0.446. According to the Bolivian Institute of Foreign Trade, Bolivia had the lowest accumulated inflation of Latin America by October 2021. However, by late 2024 it had one of the highest rates of inflation in the region, amid a new, large-scale economic crisis.

== History ==
Historical GDP per capita development

Bolivia was a major mineral exporter during the colonial period. The turbulent independence period led to the collapse of the mining industry. By the 1840s, silver production was half that of 1790. In the decades following 1850, Bolivia experienced economic growth. Bolivia remained a primarily rural country into the 20th century. Tin production became Bolivia's main industry after 1900.

The Bolivian economy grew rapidly between 1960 and 1977. According to one study, "persistent deficits and a fixed exchange rate policy during the 1970s led to a debt crisis that began in 1977. From 1977 to 1986, Bolivia lost almost all the gains in GDP per capita that it had achieved since 1960." After 1986, Bolivian economy began to grow again. Between 1998 and 2002, Bolivia experienced a financial crisis.

Inflation has plagued, and at times crippled, the Bolivian economy since the 1970s. Fiscal and monetary reform reduced the inflation rate to single digits by the 1990s, and in 2004 Bolivia experienced a manageable 4.9 percent rate of inflation.

A major blow to the Bolivian economy came with a drastic fall in the price of tin during the early 1980s, which impacted one of Bolivia's main sources of income and one of its major mining industries. At the height of the 1982–1985 Bolivian economic crisis, Bolivia experienced an annual inflation rate of more than 20,000 percent.

Since the 1985 Bolivian economic crisis, the government of Bolivia has implemented a far-reaching program of macroeconomic stabilization and structural reform aimed at maintaining price stability, creating conditions for sustained growth, and alleviating scarcity. A major reform of the customs service has significantly improved transparency in this area. Parallel legislative reforms have locked into place market-liberal policies, especially in the hydrocarbon and telecommunication sectors, that have encouraged private investment. Foreign investors are accorded national treatment.

In April 2000, Hugo Banzer, the former president of Bolivia, signed a contract with Aguas del Tunari, a private consortium, to operate and improve the water supply in Bolivia's third-largest city, Cochabamba. Shortly thereafter, the company tripled the water rates in that city, an action which resulted in protests and rioting among those who could no longer afford clean water. Amidst Bolivia's nationwide economic collapse and growing national unrest over the state of the economy, the Bolivian government was forced to withdraw the water contract.

Once Bolivia's government depended heavily on foreign assistance to finance development projects and to pay the public staff. At the end of 2002, the government owed $4.5 billion to its foreign creditors, with $1.6 billion of this amount owed to other governments and most of the balance owed to multilateral development banks. Most payments to other governments have been rescheduled on several occasions since 1987 through the Paris Club mechanism. External creditors have been willing to do this because the Bolivian government has generally achieved the monetary and fiscal targets set by IMF programs since 1987, though economic crises have undercut Bolivia's normally good record. However, by 2013 the foreign assistance is just a fraction of the government budget thanks to tax collection mainly from the profitable exports to Brazil and Argentina of natural gas. Parallel legislative reforms have locked into place market-oriented policies, especially in the hydrocarbon and telecommunication sectors, that have encouraged private investment. Foreign investors are accorded national treatment, and foreign ownership of companies enjoys virtually no restrictions in Bolivia. While the capitalization program was successful in vastly boosting foreign direct investment (FDI) in Bolivia (US$7 billion in stock during 1996–2002), FDI later decreased as investors completed their capitalization contract obligations.

In 1996, three units of the Bolivian state oil corporation (YPFB) involved in hydrocarbon exploration, production, and transportation were capitalized, facilitating the construction of a gas pipeline to Brazil. The government has a long-term sales agreement to sell 30 million cubic metres a day (MMcmd) of natural gas to Brazil through 2019. The Brazil pipeline carried about 21 MMcmd in 2000. Bolivia has the second-largest natural gas reserves in South America, and its current domestic use and exports to Brazil account for just a small portion of its potential production. Natural gas exports to Argentina resumed in 2004 at four MMcmd.

In April 2000, violent protests over plans to privatize the water utility in the city of Cochabamba led to nationwide disturbances. The government eventually cancelled the contract without compensation to the investors, returning the utility to public control. The foreign investors in this project pursued an investment dispute case against Bolivia for its actions. A similar situation occurred in 2005 in the cities of El Alto and La Paz.

Protest and widespread opposition to exporting gas through Chile led to the resignation of President Sanchez de Lozada in October 2003. The government held a binding referendum in 2004 on plans to export natural gas and on hydrocarbons law reform. By May 2005, the carbons law draft was being considered by the Senate.

According to the data of the International Monetary Fund, the World Bank, as well as several international Institutes such as ECLAC, during the period 2006 to 2019 (period of the presidency of Evo Morales and Alvaro Garcia Linera) the economy of Bolivia quadrupled from a value of 9,573 billion dollars to 42,401 billion dollars, this is due in large part to the policy of nationalization of Natural Resources, the stability of the exchange rate, the incentive of the domestic market, strong public investment in infrastructure and industrialization of natural resources such as gas and lithium. Similarly, according to studies by ECLAC, during the period from 2005–2018, Bolivia experienced a marked reduction in poverty and extreme poverty, resulting in a reduction of the population living in extreme poverty from 38.2% to 15.2%. In terms of HDI, according to the UNDP World Human Development Report, Bolivia in 2018 for the first time became classified as a "high human development Country", reaching an HDI indicator of 0.703 and rising to the 114th position of 189 countries and territories.

== Macroeconomy ==
=== Main indicators ===
Bolivia's 2016 gross domestic product referred to PPP totaled $78.35 billion and in the official exchange $35.69 billion. Its standard of living, as measured in GDP in PPP per capita was US$7,191. Economic growth was about 5.2% a year and inflation was 4.5% in 2012. Bolivia experienced a budget surplus of about 1.5% of GDP in 2012. Expenditures were nearly US$12.2 billion while revenues amounted to about US$12.6 billion. The government runs surplus accounts since 2005.

The Bolivian currency is the boliviano (ISO 4217: BOB; symbol: Bs.) One boliviano is divided into 100 centavos. The boliviano replaced the Bolivian peso at a rate of one million to one in 1987 after many years of rampant inflation. At that time, 1 new boliviano was roughly equivalent to 1 U.S. dollar. At the end of 2011 the boliviano was only worth around 0.145 U.S. Dollar. Annual interest rates in 2010 had decreased steadily to 9.9 percent from more than 50 percent before 1997.

Bolivia's human development index was reported at 0.675, comprising a health index of 0.740, an education index of 0.743 and a GNI index of 0.530, ranking within the group of medium human development. "Between 1980 and 2012 Bolivia (Plurinational State of)'s HDI rose by 1.3% annually from 0.489 to 0.675 today, which gives the country a rank of 108 out of 187 countries with comparable data. The HDI of Latin America and the Caribbean as a region increased from 0.574 in 1980 to 0.741 today, placing Bolivia (Plurinational State of) below the regional average."

The following table shows the main economic indicators in 1980–2025 (with IMF staff estimates for 2026–2031). Inflation below 5% is in green.

Year	GDP (in bn. US$PPP)	GDP per capita (in US$ PPP)	GDP (in bn. US$nominal)	GDP per capita (in US$ nominal)	GDP growth (real)	Inflation rate (in Percent)	Unemployment (in Percent)	Government debt (in % of GDP)
1980	15.1	2,752.1	3.8	690.2	▲0.6%	▲47.1%	n/a	n/a
1981	▲16.5	▲2,791.0	▼3.6	▼610.9	▲0.3%	▲32.1%	n/a	n/a
1982	▲16.9	▼2,788.6	▲4.0	▲663.4	▼−3.9%	▲123.6%	n/a	n/a
1983	▼16.8	▼2,723.8	▼3.8	▼615.1	▼−4.0%	▲275.6%	n/a	n/a
1984	▲17.4	▲2,758.8	▲3.9	▲626.3	▼−0.2%	▲1,281.3%	n/a	n/a
1985	▲17.6	▼2,741.1	▲4.3	▲663.8	▼−1.7%	▲11,749.6%	n/a	n/a
1986	▼17.5	▼2,668.6	▼4.2	▼636.0	▼−2.6%	▲273.4%	n/a	n/a
1987	▲18.4	▲2,744.8	▲4.5	▲678.3	▲2.5%	▲14.6%	n/a	n/a
1988	▲19.6	▲2,864.5	▲4.8	▲706.6	▲2.9%	▲16.0%	n/a	n/a
1989	▲21.1	▲3,026.5	▲5.0	▲710.0	▲3.8%	▲15.2%	n/a	n/a
1990	▲22.9	▲3,218.1	▲5.1	▲717.8	▲4.6%	▲17.1%	n/a	n/a
1991	▲24.9	▲3,425.8	▲5.7	▲777.1	▲5.1%	▲21.4%	n/a	n/a
1992	▲26.0	▲3,497.7	▲6.0	▲810.4	▲1.9%	▲13.0%	n/a	n/a
1993	▲27.8	▲3,662.1	▲6.2	▲811.7	▲4.3%	▲8.5%	n/a	n/a
1994	▲29.7	▲3,840.6	▲6.4	▲832.2	▲4.7%	▲7.9%	n/a	n/a
1995	▲31.7	▲4,026.8	▲7.3	▲921.3	▲4.7%	▲10.2%	n/a	n/a
1996	▲33.8	▲4,210.2	▲8.0	▲1,001.8	▲4.6%	▲12.4%	n/a	n/a
1997	▲36.1	▲4,416.6	▲8.7	▲1,065.4	▲5.0%	▲4.7%	n/a	n/a
1998	▲38.6	▲4,639.7	▲9.4	▲1,135.4	▲5.7%	▲7.7%	n/a	n/a
1999	▲39.3	▲4,649.2	▼9.2	▼1,088.3	▲0.5%	▲2.2%	n/a	n/a
2000	▲41.1	▲4,773.6	▲9.4	▲1,088.8	▲2.1%	▲4.6%	7.5%	66.5%
2001	▲42.7	▲4,877.2	▼9.1	▼1,039.7	▲1.6%	▲1.6%	▲8.5%	▲74.4%
2002	▲44.5	▲5,001.3	▼8.9	▼999.4	▲2.7%	▲0.9%	▲8.7%	▲77.2%
2003	▲46.2	▲5,107.3	▲9.1	▲1,000.6	▲1.8%	▲3.3%	8.7%	▲85.5%
2004	▲49.4	▲5,366.7	▲9.8	▲1,063.6	▲4.1%	▲2.5%	▼8.4%	▼80.6%
2005	▲53.1	▲5,671.7	▲10.8	▲1,148.5	▲4.2%	▲5.4%	▼8.1%	▼73.2%
2006	▲57.3	▲6,019.4	▲12.9	▲1,354.5	▲4.7%	▲4.3%	▼8.0%	▼48.6%
2007	▲61.8	▲6,382.9	▲14.9	▲1,539.4	▲5.0%	▲8.7%	▼7.7%	▼35.5%
2008	▲67.2	▲6,822.5	▲19.1	▲1,936.7	▲6.7%	▲14.0%	▼4.4%	▼32.4%
2009	▲69.6	▲6,950.5	▲20.1	▲2,003.8	▲3.0%	▲3.3%	▲4.9%	▲34.1%
2010	▲73.6	▲7,229.7	▲22.7	▲2,229.2	▲4.5%	▲2.5%	▼4.4%	▼32.8%
2011	▲79.3	▲7,660.6	▲27.9	▲2,697.4	▲5.5%	▲9.9%	▼3.8%	▼30.5%
2012	▲85.2	▲8,097.9	▲31.4	▲2,990.1	▲5.5%	▲4.5%	▼3.2%	▲30.7%
2013	▲92.8	▲8,686.0	▲36.0	▲3,366.7	▲7.1%	▲5.7%	▲4.0%	▲31.0%
2014	▲99.9	▲9,204.7	▲39.3	▲3,623.1	▲5.8%	▲5.8%	4.0%	▲31.8%
2015	▲105.8	▲9,602.2	▲40.0	▲3,634.6	▲4.9%	▲4.1%	▲4.6%	▲34.0%
2016	▲111.4	▲9,964.7	▲41.6	▲3,721.4	▲4.3%	▲3.6%	▲4.7%	▲38.2%
2017	▲118.2	▲10,420.4	▲46.3	▲4,077.9	▲4.2%	▲2.8%	▲5.1%	▲41.9%
2018	▲123.8	▲10,758.4	▲48.8	▲4,237.5	▲2.9%	▲2.3%	▼4.9%	▲44.2%
2019	▲128.4	▲11,005.4	▲49.4	▼4,233.8	▲1.5%	▲1.8%	▲5.0%	▲48.9%
2020	▼113.2	▼9,581.0	▼42.6	▼3,607.1	▼−12.7%	▲0.9%	▲8.3%	▲67.5%
2021	▲133.7	▲11,202.4	▲48.2	▲4,040.0	▲10.0%	▲0.7%	▼6.9%	▲68.7%
2022	▲148.6	▲12,308.1	▲51.3	▲4,250.2	▲3.7%	▲1.7%	▼4.7%	▲69.2%
2023	▲158.1	▲12,912.3	▲52.7	▲4,305.9	▲2.5%	▲2.6%	▼4.1%	▲78.3%
2024	▲160.3	▲12,915.8	▲55.3	▲4,453.4	▼−1.1%	▲5.1%	▼3.7%	▲83.2%
2025	▲161.9	▼12,871.4	▲65.2	▲5,185.3	▼−1.6%	▲19.5%	▼3.3%	▲83.3%
2026	▲162.4	▼12,735.9	▼53.8	▼4,223.2	▼−3.0%	▲12.7%	▲4.5%	▲100.2%
2027	▲165.0	▲12,771.6	n/a	n/a	▼−1.5%	▲15.8%	▲5.2%	▼95.1%
2028	▲169.2	▲12,934.5	n/a	n/a	▲0.5%	▲8.2%	5.2%	▼93.0%
2029	▲176.7	▲13,344.6	n/a	n/a	▲2.5%	▲7.3%	5.2%	▼88.9%
2030	▲185.2	▲13,818.1	n/a	n/a	▲2.9%	▲5.8%	5.2%	▼85.3%
2031	▲193.5	▲14,267.4	n/a	n/a	▲2.7%	▲5.0%	5.2%	▼82.3%

== Sectors ==
=== Primary sector ===
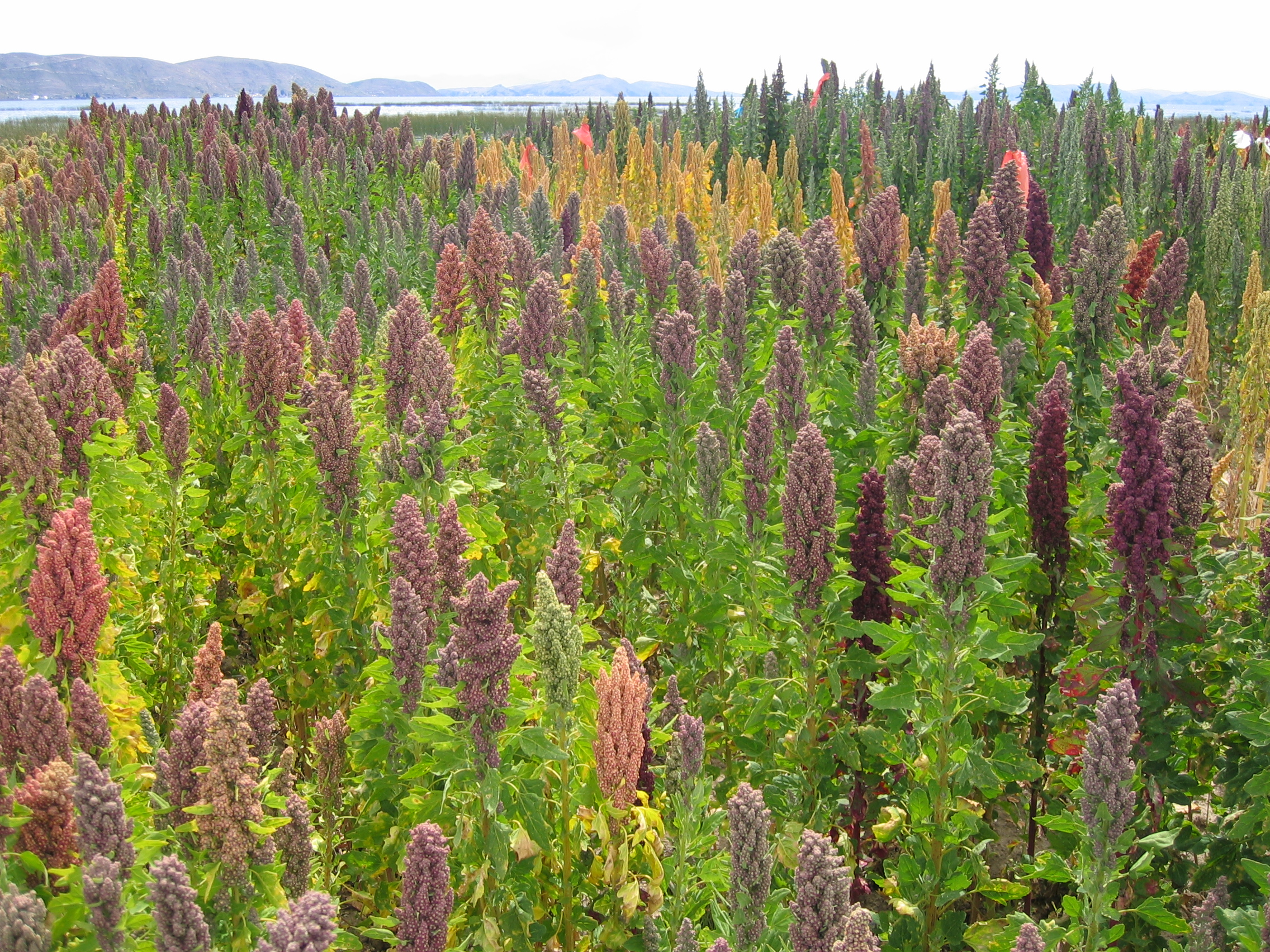
Quinoa field near Lake Titicaca. Bolivia is the world's second largest producer of quinoa.

==== Agriculture, fishing and forestry ====
Agriculture, forestry, and fishing accounted for 14 percent of Bolivia's gross domestic product (GDP) in 2003, down from 28 percent in 1986. Combined, these activities employ nearly 44 percent of Bolivia's workers. Most agricultural workers are engaged in subsistence farming—the dominant economic activity of the highlands region. Agricultural production in Bolivia is complicated by both the country's topography and climate. High elevations make farming difficult, as do the El Niño weather patterns and seasonal flooding. Bolivia's agricultural GDP continues to rise but has attained only a rather modest average growth rate of 2.8 percent annually since 1991.

Bolivia's most lucrative agricultural product continues to be coca, of which Bolivia is currently the world's third largest cultivator after Colombia and Peru, with an estimated 29,500 hectares under cultivation in 2007, slightly higher than the previous year. Bolivia is the third-largest producer of cocaine, a drug produced from coca, estimated at 120 metric tons potential pure cocaine in 2007 and a transit country for Peruvian and Colombian cocaine destined illegally for the U.S., Europe, Brazil, Argentina, Chile, and Paraguay. The Bolivian government, in response to international pressure, worked to restrict coca cultivation. However, eradication efforts have hampered by the lack of a suitable replacement crop for rural communities that have cultivated coca for generations. The Morales government turned back some of the results which was obtained in previous years.

Since 2001 Bolivia's leading legal agricultural export has been soybeans. Additionally, cotton, coffee, and sugarcane have been viable exports for Bolivia. For domestic consumption, corn, wheat, and potatoes are the crops of choice of Bolivian farmers. Despite its vast forests, Bolivia has only a minor timber industry. In 2003 timber accounted for only 3.5 percent of export earnings. The Forestry Law of 1996 imposed a tax on sawn lumber and consequently cut Bolivian lumber exports significantly. The tax was used to establish the Forestry Stewardship Council, which has been only minimally successful in forest restoration efforts and eliminating illegal logging. With increased efficiency, Bolivia could likely expand the profitability of its forest resources, while still protecting them from overexploitation. Bolivia has a small fishing industry that taps the country's freshwater lakes and streams. The annual catch averages about 6,000 tons.

In 2018, Bolivia produced 9.6 million tons of sugarcane, 2.9 million tons of soy, 1.2 million tons of maize, 1.1 million tons of potato, 1 million tons of sorghum, 700 thousand tons of banana, 541 thousand tons of rice, 301 thousand tons of wheat, in addition to smaller yields of other agricultural products, such as tangerine, cassava, orange, beans, sunflower seed, cotton etc.

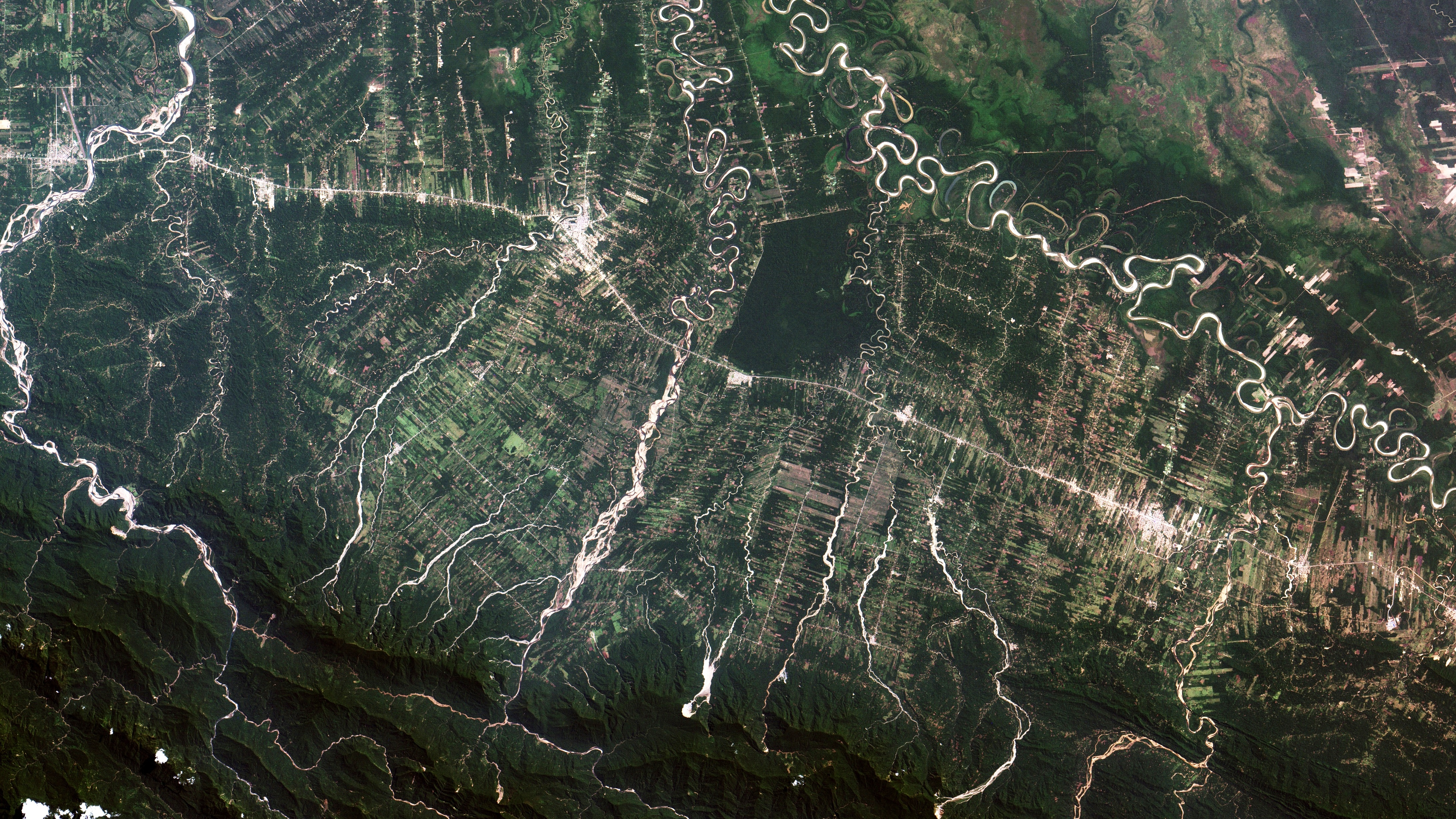
Satellite view of coca leaf and tropical fruit plantations in the Ivirgazama region of Bolivia. Several tropical areas in the country have experienced major deforestation.

Agriculture and forestry is also the lifeline for multitudes of small villages which house a majority of the population. Small village economy stumbled and dwindled from the late twentieth century due to aggravating environmental problems including deforestation and consequent soil degradation, water pollution, loss of biodiversity, and so on. Besides, political and social problems also greatly obstruct the growth of small village development: political turmoil, post-civil war predicament and burgeoning fiscal deficit have strangled most investment incentives; corruption and manipulation of water supply by foreign companies have greatly undermined the availability and efficiency of local market, leaving little profits for village farmers and producers. Furthermore, the global market poses a threat to the stability and sustainability of Bolivia's frail economy: "a drop in export prices, reduction of informal trade" and low-skilled over-homogenized local products have further worsened the bleak condition of Bolivia's microeconomic activities, making it almost impossible for village farms and factories to make a living from trading with the world. Dwindling profits and surging cost of production have made small village economy in Bolivia extremely vulnerable and unstable; as a result, unemployment increases and small business is on the verge of bankruptcy, which in return made government intervention very inefficient and deferred many governmental initiatives and attempts to improve the condition.

==== Mining ====
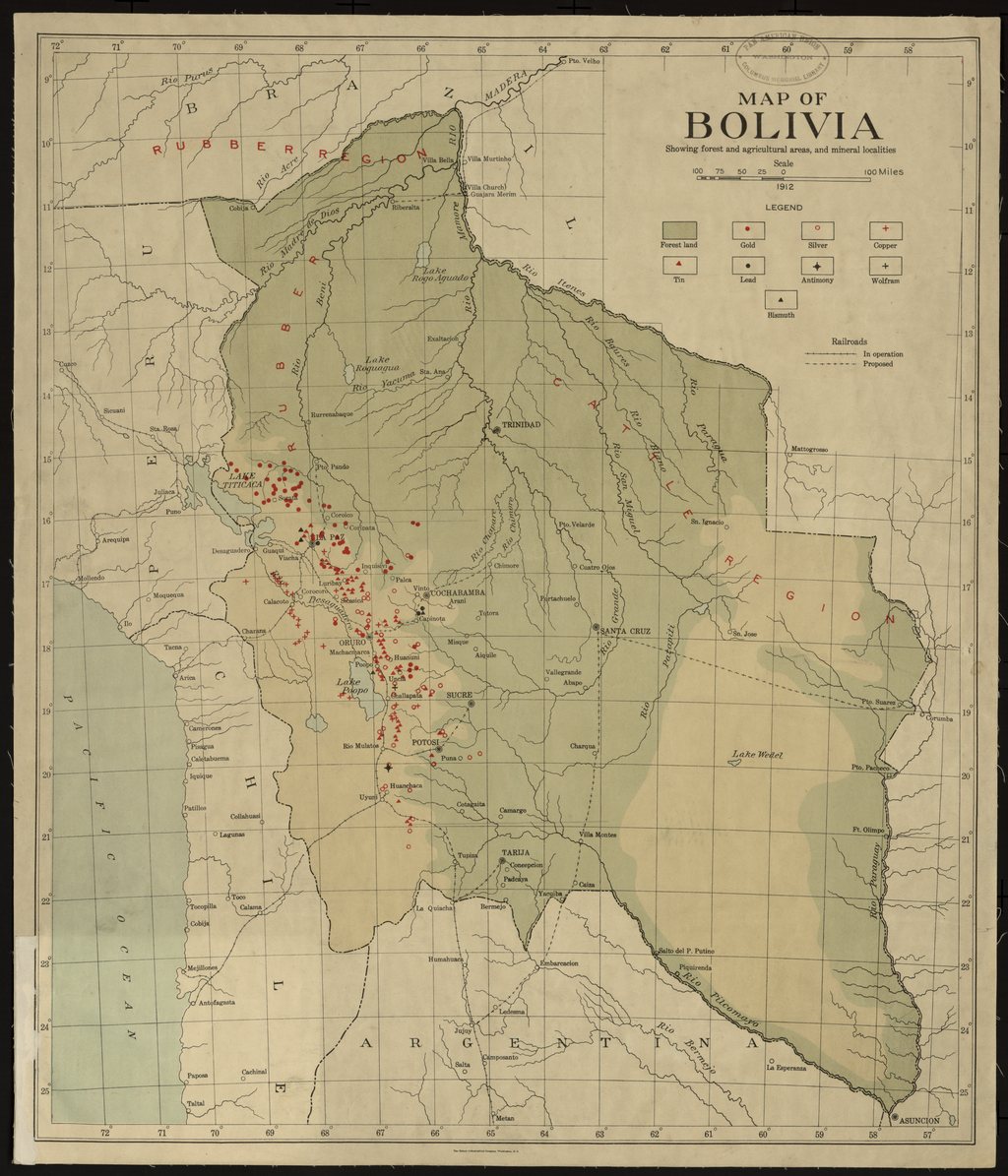
"Map of Bolivia, Showing Forest and Agriculture Areas, and Mineral Localities" from 1912

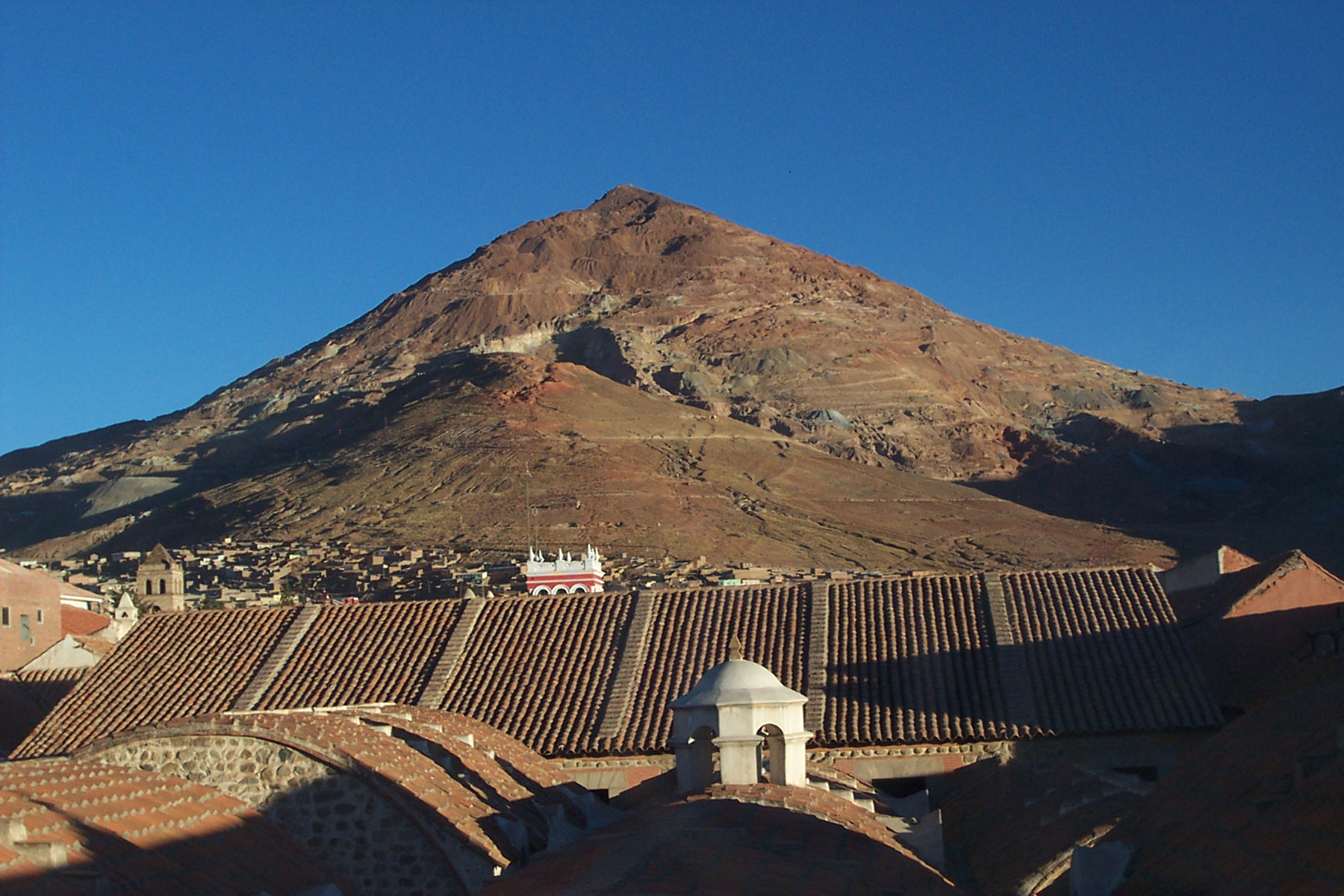
Cerro Rico in Potosi, still a major silver mine. Bolivia is the world's 8th largest producer of silver.

In 2019, the country was the 8th largest world producer of silver; 4th largest world producer of boron; 5th largest world producer of antimony; 5th largest world producer of tin; 6th largest world producer of tungsten; 7th largest producer of zinc, and the 8th largest producer of lead.

Mining continues to be vital to Bolivia's economy. The collapse of the world tin market in the 1980s led to a restructuring of the industry. The state dramatically reduced its control and presently operates only a small portion of mining activities. Small-scale operations, often with low productivity, employ many former state miners. Natural gas has supplanted tin and silver as the country's most valuable natural commodity. A discovery in 1997 confirmed a tenfold gain in Bolivia's known natural gas reserves. Finding markets to utilize this resource, both domestically and internationally, has been slowed by a lack of infrastructure and conflicts over the state's role in controlling natural resources. Although the world tin market has re-emerged, Bolivia now faces stiff competition from Southeast Asian countries producing lower-cost alluvial tin. Gold and silver production has increased dramatically over the past decade. Annually, as of 2002 Bolivia extracted and exported more than 11,000 kilograms of gold and 461 tons of silver. Additionally, Bolivia has increased zinc production, extracting more than 100,000 tons each year. Other metals excavated include antimony, iron, and tungsten.

===== Lithium =====
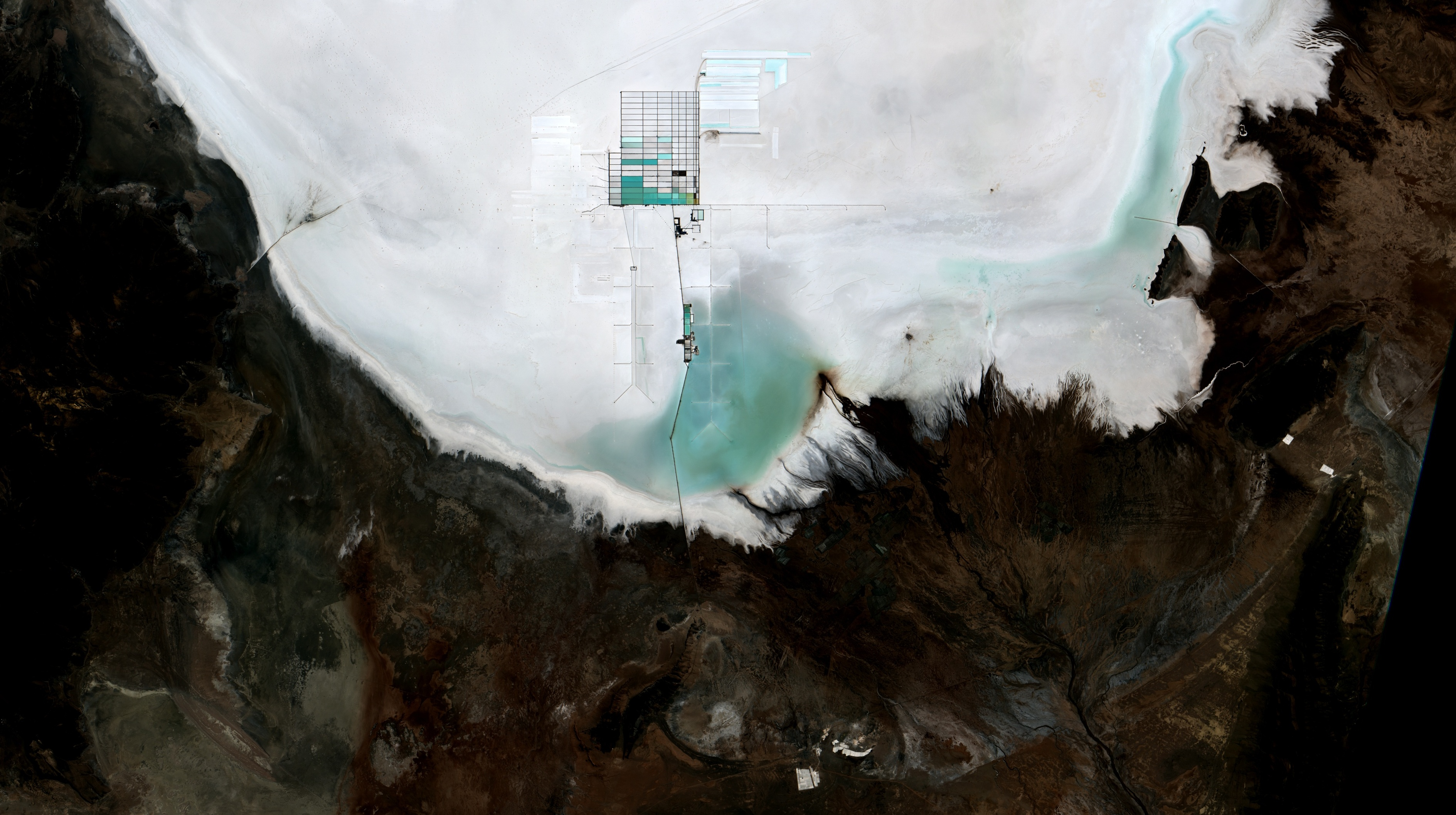
Lithium mine in the Salar de Uyuni

According to the United States Geological Survey, Bolivia has 9 million tons of lithium, which can be used to make lithium batteries, used in hybrid and electric vehicles in addition to huge numbers of smaller batteries. At 14.5%, this is the second-largest known concentration of lithium in any country; Argentina has 14.8 million known tons of lithium, Chile has 8.5 million tons, Australia has 7.7 million tons, and the United States has 6.8 million tons. These large deposits are located in desert regions farmed by indigenous groups, who claim their share of the profits made from their natural resources. Bolivian President Evo Morales favored national, rather than foreign, ownership of natural resources, and nationalized the country's oil and natural gas reserves.

Mining the mineral deposits would involve disturbing the country's salt flats (called Salar de Uyuni), an important natural feature which boosts tourism in the region. The government does not want to destroy this unique natural landscape to meet the rising world demand for lithium.

In January 2013, Bolivia opened a lithium production plant in Uyuni, producing mainly potassium chloride. Also, the Bolivian government signed intentions to develop not only lithium extraction but also lithium-ion battery production with numerous countries, especially from the Asia Pacific region.

In 2019, Bolivia had signed a deal with German firm ACISA to develop a joint partnership with the Bolivian state-owned YLB for developing extraction and processing of lithium at Salar de Uyuni. The deal was later cancelled after long-running protests by locals over the perceived lack of local benefits and royalties of the project. Bolivia's state lithium YLB also created a joint venture together with the Chinese Xinjiang TBEA Group to explore extraction of lithium and other materials from the Coipasa and Pastos Grandes salt flats. It is thought that due to the importance of lithium for batteries for electric vehicles and stabilization of electric grids with large proportions of intermittent renewables in the electricity mix, Bolivia could be strengthened geopolitically. However, this perspective has also been criticized for underestimating the power of economic incentives for expanded production in other parts of the world.

=== Industry and manufacturing ===
Annually, manufacturing accounted for in approximately 18% of Bolivia's gross domestic product between 1995 and 2005. The share of industry as a whole (including the mining industry) to the GDP increased from 30 percent in 2000 to 37.3 percent in 2010. Most industry is a small-scale, aimed at regional markets rather than national operations. Inadequate credit options and competition from the black market have kept Bolivia's manufacturing sector from developing fully. Leading manufactured goods in Bolivia include textiles, clothing, non-durable consumer goods, processed soya, refined metals, and refined petroleum.

Processing of food, beverages and tobacco is the biggest sector within the manufacturing industry (39% in 2001). This sector occupies a prominent place in the manufacturing industry that is continually growing, both in production and number of businesses and jobs. In 2010 its share in exports was about 14%. Especially the soybean and its derivatives reached very large export markets in recent years. The largest factories producing soybeans, sunflower seeds, cotton and sugar from sugar cane, are mainly situated in Santa Cruz, although a large edible oil refineries operate in Cochabamba. All major cities have at least one brewery, one or more soft drink bottling plants, and one or more packaging plants for canned food.. There has been some growth in publicly owned manufacturing during the presidency of Luis Arce, with Bolivia opening an açai berry processing plant in 2021.

The textiles industry was the second largest manufacturing sector after the food industry in the 1970s and was of decreasing importance afterwards, representing progressively diminishing value of total manufacturing. But since the 1990s the textile industry has increased its growth rate. The cotton and wool industry declined at the expense of synthetic fibers. The largest concentration of textile mills are to be found in La Paz, but also in Santa Cruz and Cochabamba and to a lesser extent in Oruro.

=== Services ===
The services industry in Bolivia remains undeveloped. Inhabiting one of the poorest countries in South America, Bolivians have weak purchasing power. The retail sector suffers from weak demand and competition with a large black market of contraband goods. U.S. companies such as McDonald's and Domino's have pulled out of Bolivia in recent years.

==== Banking and finance ====
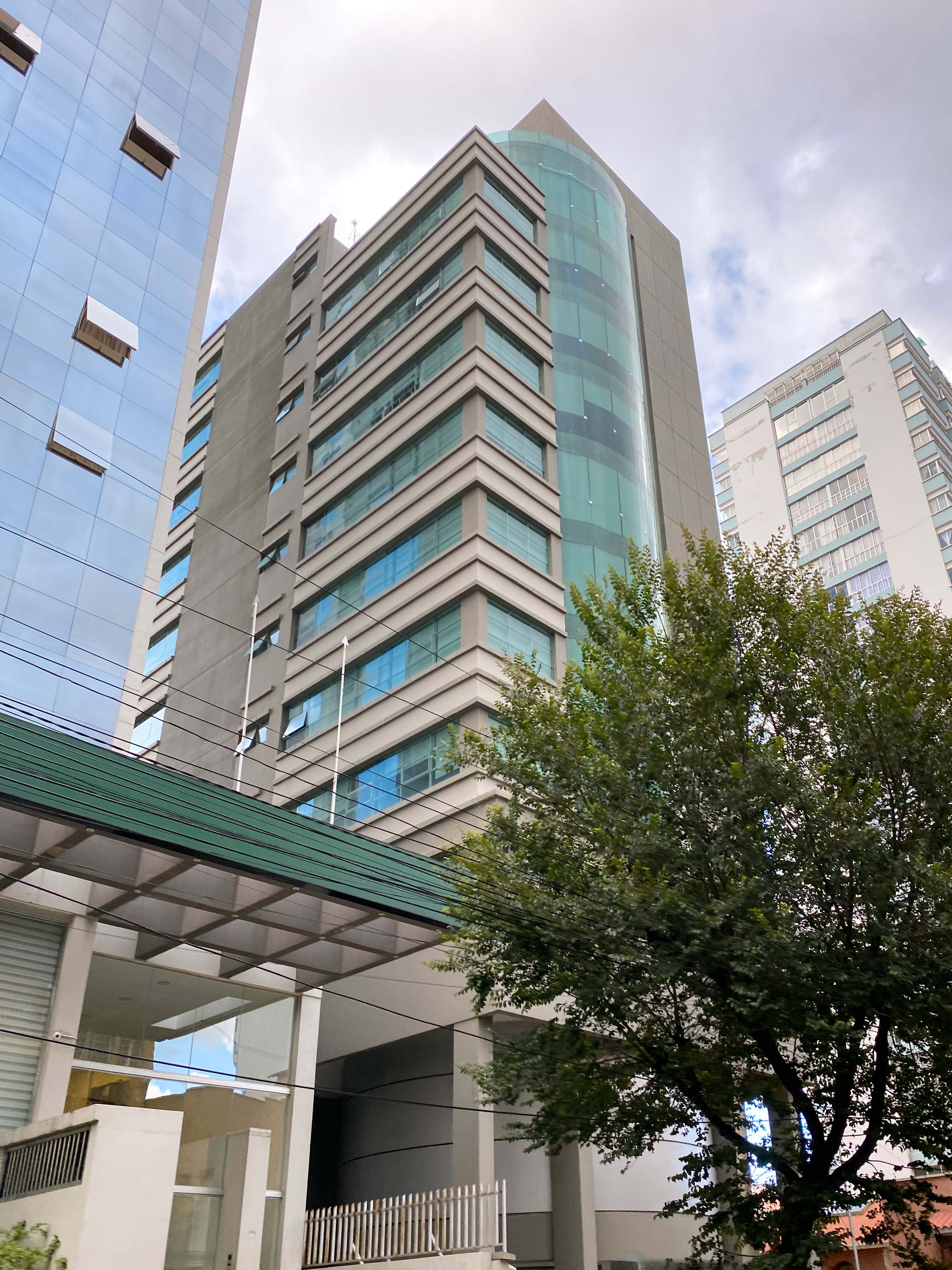
Headquarters of the Bolivian Stock Exchange in La Paz.

Banking in Bolivia has long suffered from corruption and weak regulation. However, a series of reforms initiated by the 1993 Banking Law and subsequent acts are gradually improving Bolivia's banking sector. Bolivia has a central bank and nine private banks. Consolidation occurred following reforms, lowering the number of private banks in Bolivia from 14 in 1995 to nine in 2003. Foreign participation and investment in Bolivian banks are allowed. About 90 percent of Bolivian bank deposits are held in U.S. dollars. The Bolivian government is trying to change this situation by taxing dollarized accounts while exempting boliviano accounts from the tax. As recently as 2002, 27 percent of all loans were non-performing, leading most foreign investors to focus their resources in the somewhat-safer venue of corporate lending. Most bank lending in 2003 went to manufacturing (24 percent), followed by property services (18 percent) and trade and retail (16 percent). Bad debt remains at a historically high level. Further reforms are necessary, including the pending act to introduce a deposit guarantee system. Bolivia's stock market expanded in 1998 to include corporate bonds, along with the money market and government bond options that had existed previously. The privatization of Bolivia's social security program has bolstered the stock market.

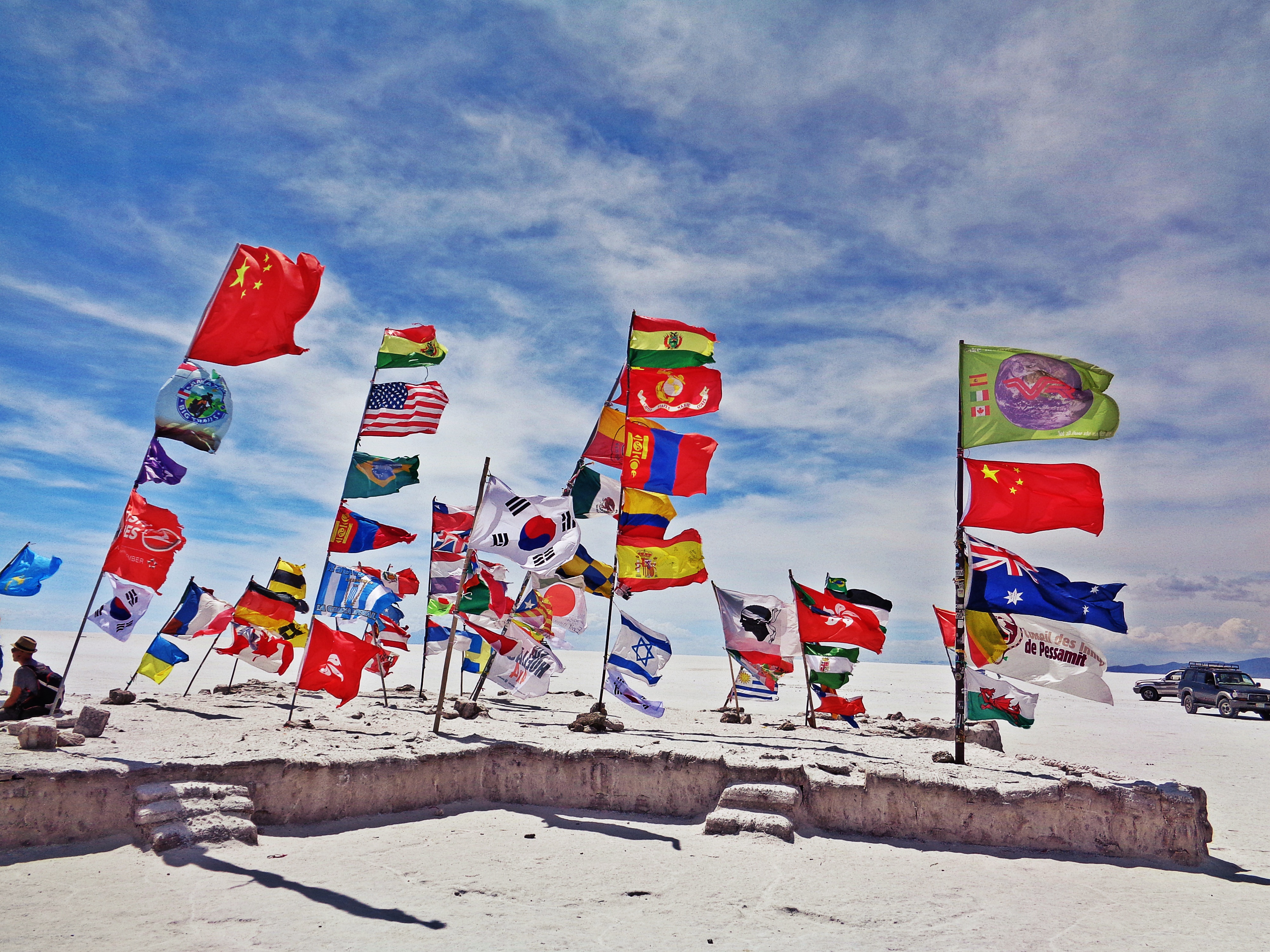
The Salar de Uyuni is a major tourist destination in Bolivia.

==== Education ====
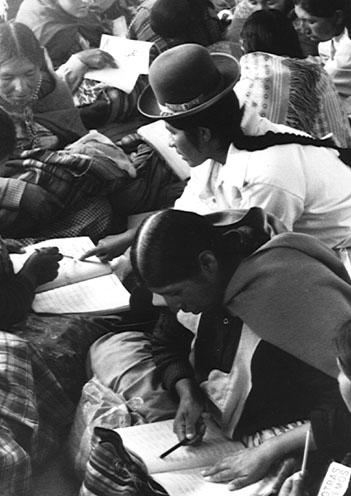
Literacy class in the El Alto section of La Paz

Education in Bolivia, as in many other areas of Bolivian life, has a divide between Bolivia's rural and urban areas. Rural illiteracy levels remain high, even as the rest of the country becomes increasingly literate. Bolivia devotes 23% of its annual budget to educational expenditures, a higher percentage than in most other South American countries, albeit from a smaller national budget. A comprehensive, education reform has made some significant changes. Initiated in 1994, the reform decentralized educational funding in order to meet diverse local needs, improved teacher training and curricula, formalized and expanded intercultural bilingual education and changed the school grade system. Resistance from teachers’ unions, however, has slowed implementation of some of the intended reforms.

The Human Rights Measurement Initiative (HRMI) finds that Bolivia is fulfilling only 83.2% of what it should be fulfilling for the right to education based on the country's level of income. HRMI breaks down the right to education by looking at the rights to both primary education and secondary education. While taking into consideration Bolivia's income level, the nation is achieving 85.7% of what should be possible based on its resources (income) for primary education but only 80.7% for secondary education.

==== Healthcare ====
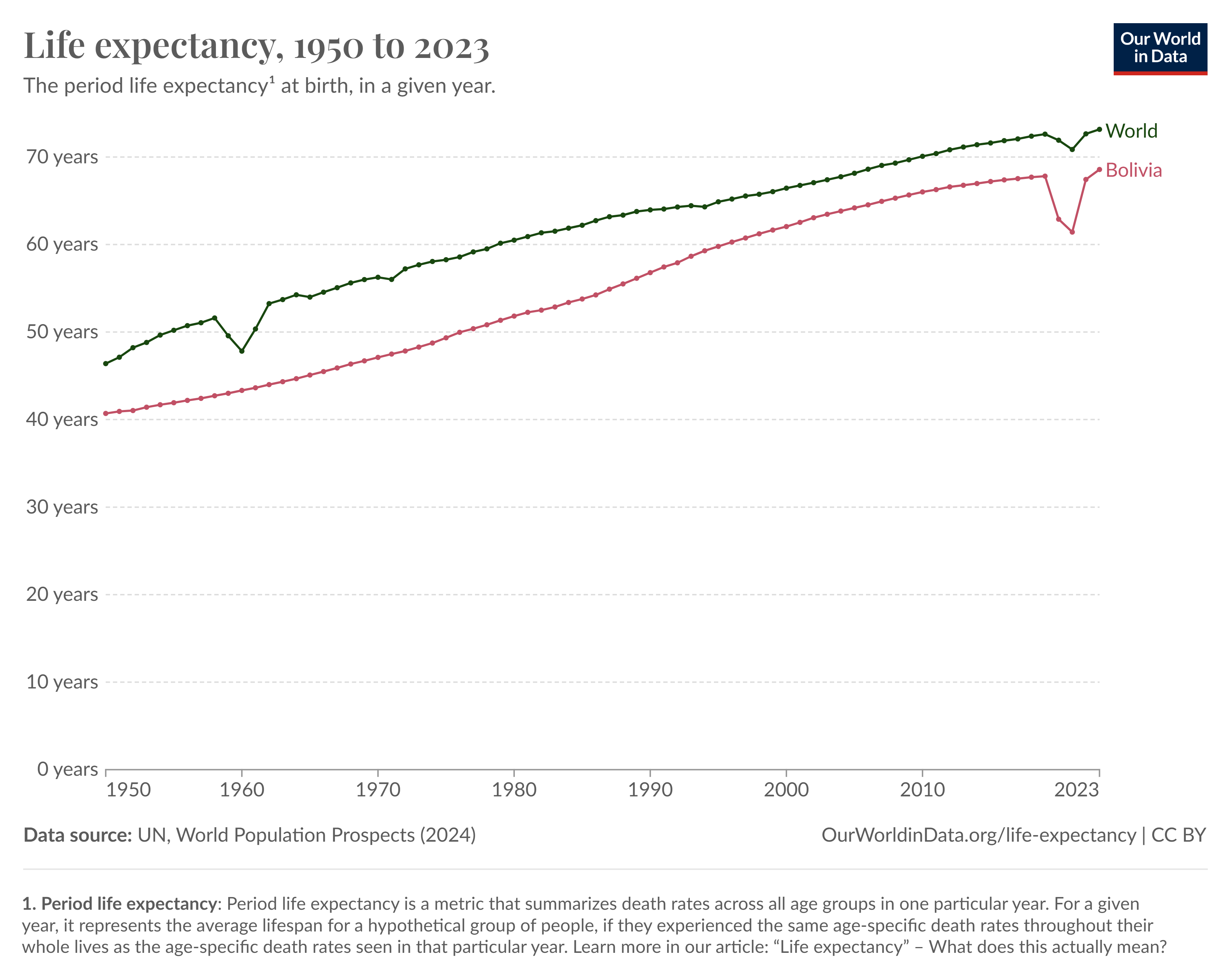
Figure 1. Evolution of life expectancy at birth in Bolivia compared to the worldwide trend during the 1950-2023 period.

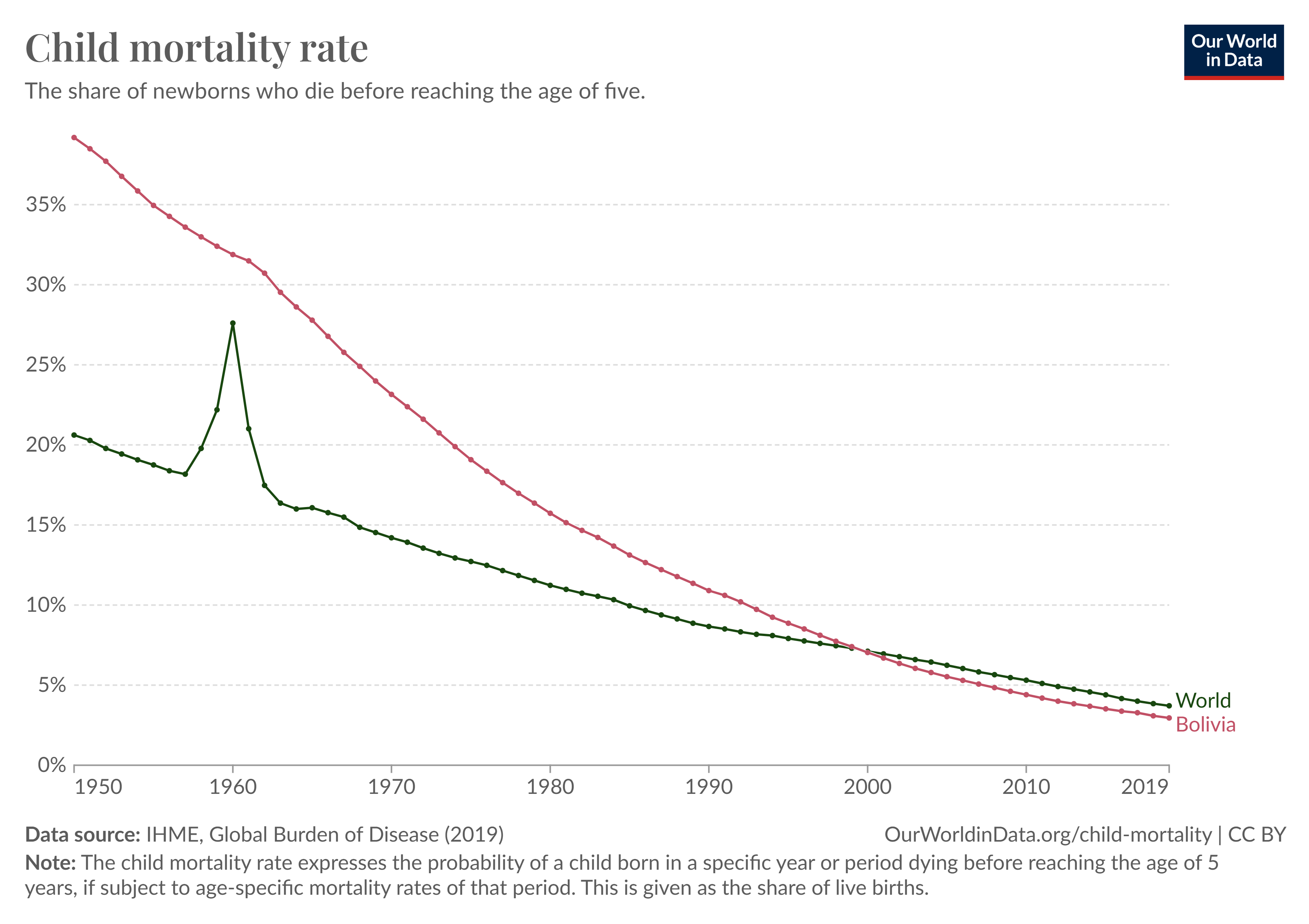
Figure 2. Child mortality rate of Bolivia compared to the world during the 1990-2019 period.

Considering the main health indicators, Bolivia has made improvements over the last decades. Since 1950, life expectancy at birth (Figure 1) has considerably improved from 40.7 years to 68.6 years in 2023, falling a little behind the world trend (73.2 years). Child mortality rate (Figure 2) has greatly decreased since 1950, from 39.2% to 2.95% in 2019, being slightly lower than the world's rate (3.71%). Maternal health although has improved considerably, maternal mortality ratio (Figure 3) continues to be higher (205.49 deaths per 100,000 live births) than the world's ratio (158.84 deaths per 100,000 live births) in 2021.

According to data from the United Nations Development Programme, Bolivia has a human development index (HDI) value of 0.698 for 2022, positioning in the medium human development category at position 120 out of 193. Since the 90s, HDI value increased from 0.546 to 0.698.

However, according to the Human Rights Measurement Initiative, Bolivia falls into the category in the very bad in ensuring the exercise of right to health, with 74.7% of the HMRI value for 2021, for which, better management of its income is required for improvement.

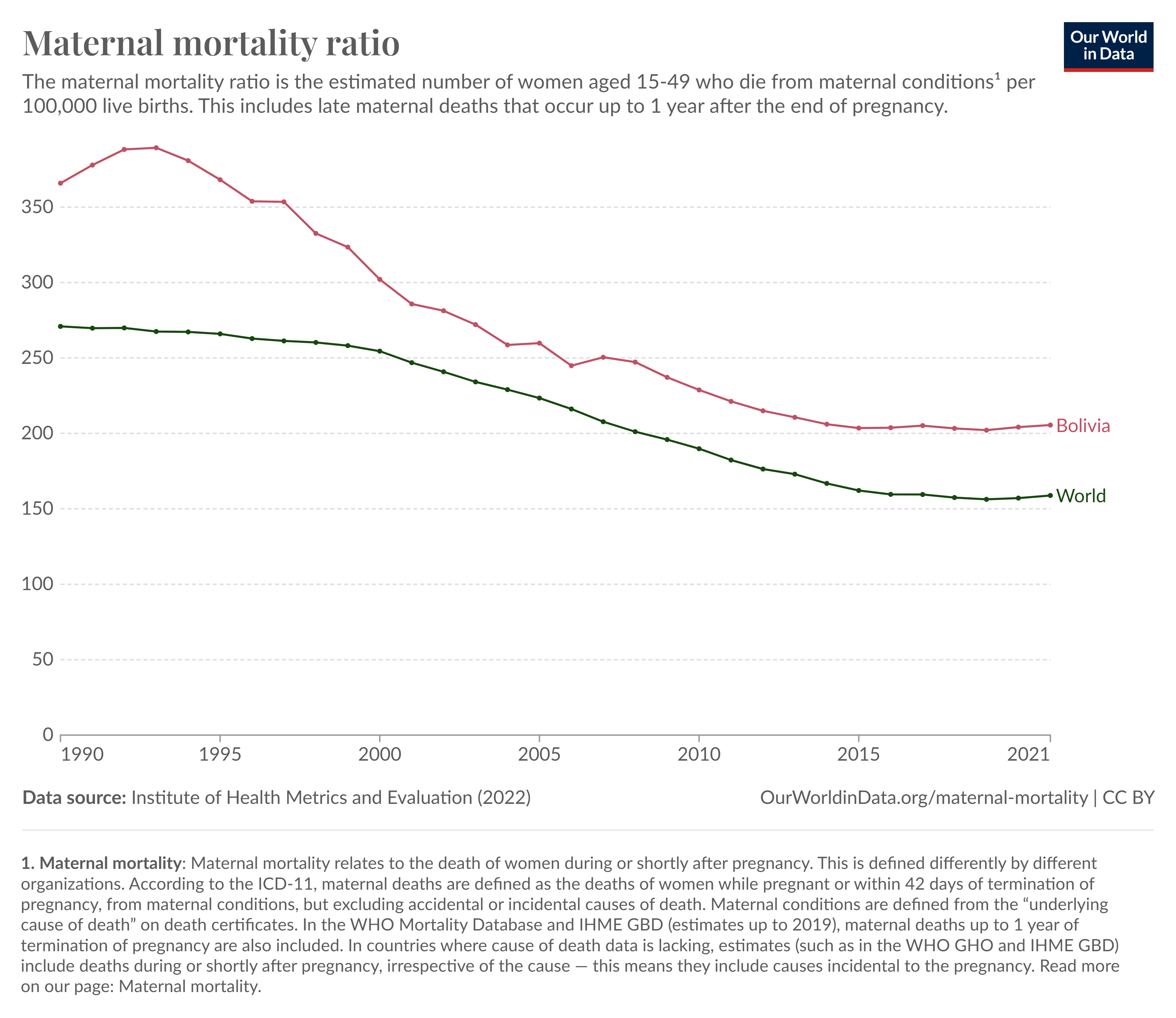
Figure 3. Maternal mortality ratio per 100,000 live births of Bolivia compared to the world during the 1990-2021 period.

==== Tourism ====
Bolivia's spectacular vistas and natural attractions have not been enough to transform the country into a major tourist destination because of its political instability and lack of first-class accommodations. Still, Bolivia's tourist industry has grown gradually over the past 15 years. In 2000 Bolivia attracted 306,000 tourists, compared with 254,000 in 1990. Tourist revenue peaked at US$179 million in 1999. Tourism in Bolivia declined following the 11 September 2001 attack on the United States, as was the case across North and South America. Since from 2001 the tourism sector, however, is strongly increasing, in fact in 2018 the number of tourists reached 1.142,000 arrivals.

== Infrastructure ==
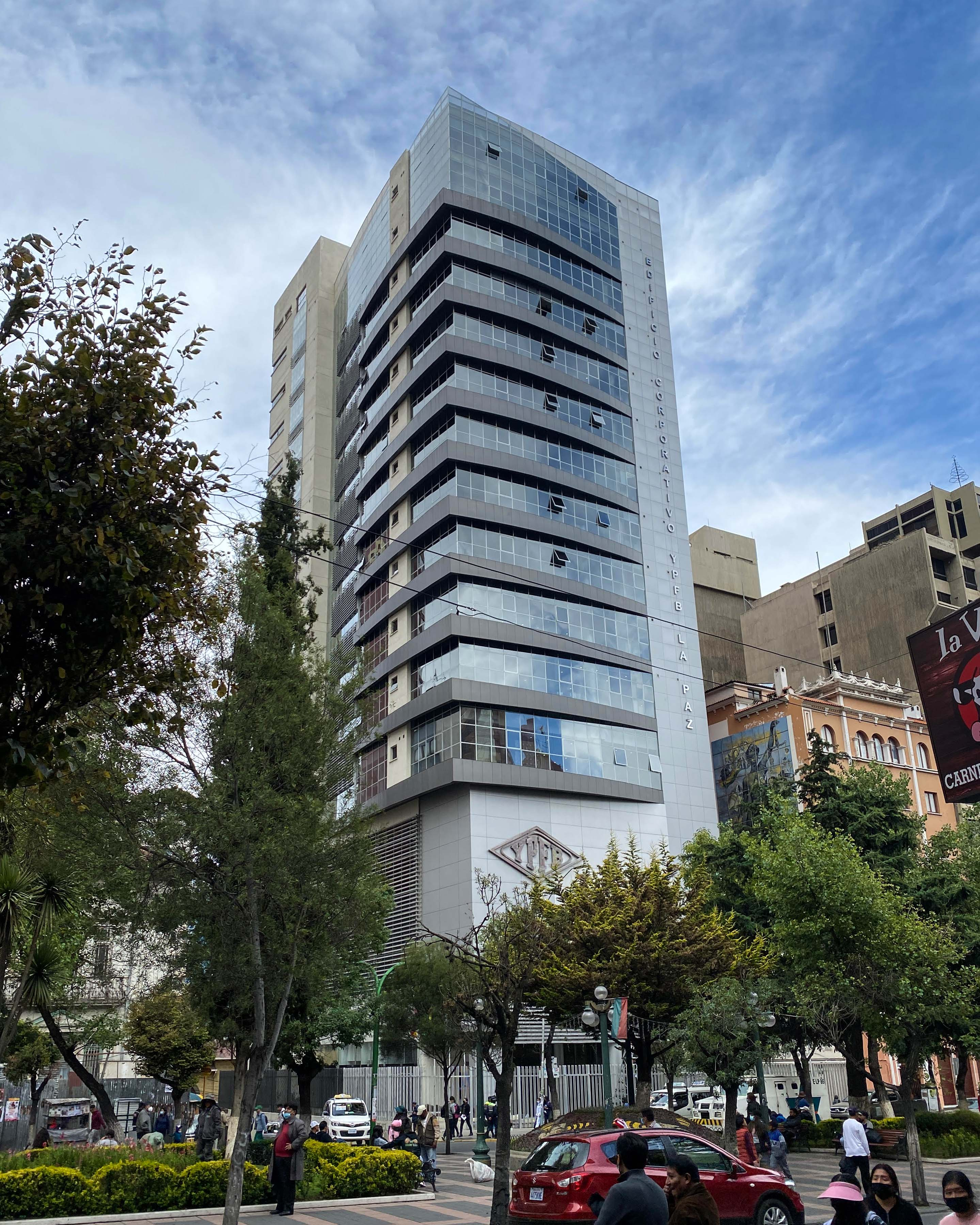
Headquarters of YPFB in La Paz, Bolivia's largest energy company.

=== Energy ===
Bolivia's energy needs are relatively small but growing consistently. Bolivia uses oil for the majority of its power needs, followed by natural gas and hydroelectric power.

==== Oil ====
Bolivia has estimated oil reserves of 441 million barrels (70,100,000 m^{3}), the fifth largest in South America. The fields are located in the east and south. The main activities in the refineries is crude oil fractioning, catalytic conversion for high octane gasoline, and refining of heavy fractions to produce lubricants. The final products are vehicle gasoline, liquid propane and butane, jet fuel, diesel oil and lubricants for use in industrial machinery. As domestic oil production is insufficient to meet domestic demand Bolivia is a net importer of oil.

Until recently the country's oil industry was fully controlled by the state company YPFB, established in 1936 with the mission to develop, refine and distribute oil resources. After privatization efforts in the 1990s the transport of natural gas and oil was in private hands during the 1990s while the production and refining of materials was part of risk-sharing contracts between the government and private investors. In 1999 the refineries were also completely privatized. In May 2006 president Evo Morales re-nationalized reserves, while its exploitation remained in private hands.

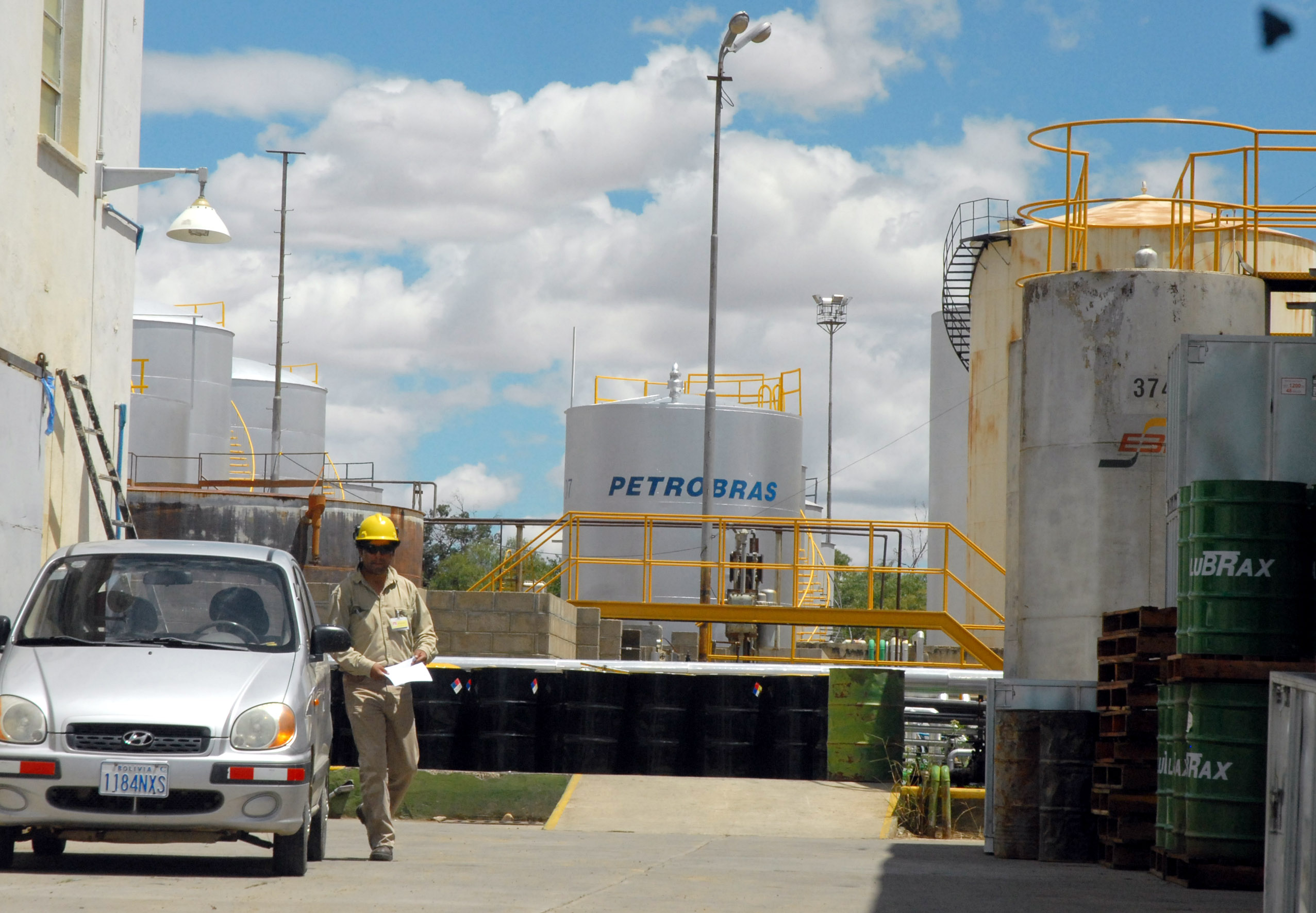
Oil refinery plant in Cochabamba belonging to Brazilian state-owned company Petrobras.

==== Natural gas ====
Most of Bolivia's gas comes from gas fields located in San Alberto, San Antonio, Margarita, and Incahuasi. These areas are in the territory of the indigenous Guarani people, and the region is frequently viewed as a remote backwater by non-residents.

The country's natural gas reserves total 27.6 trillion cubic feet (780 km^{3}) according to Bolivian government figures, ranking Bolivia behind only Venezuela in terms of proven natural gas reserves in South America. Additionally, Bolivia is self-sufficient in its energy production. The sector changed significantly when the government allowed privatization in the mid-1990s. International companies quickly invested in Bolivian energy sources, particularly in natural gas, and made Bolivia into a player in the world energy market. The exportation of Bolivian energy resources, while potentially lucrative economically, has been politically hazardous. President Gonzalo Sánchez de Lozada ultimately resigned over his plan to export natural gas to the United States and Mexico in 2003.

On 6 June 2005, former president Carlos Mesa offered his resignation to the Bolivian Congress after months of demonstrations by Bolivia's indigenous population calling for renationalizing the natural gas and oil sectors. Mesa had increased taxation on foreign companies while still encouraging their investment in Bolivian energy development. On 1 May 2006, his successor, former president Morales, signed a decree stating that all natural gas reserves were to be nationalized, recovering ownership, possession and control of hydrocarbons. US Exxon Mobil Corporation, Petrobras, Spain's Repsol YPF, UK gas and oil producer BG Group Plc, and France's Total are the main gas companies present in the country.

Bolivia's natural gas exports bring in millions of dollars per day, in royalties, rents and taxes. From 2007 to 2017, what is referred to as the "government take" on gas totaled approximately $22 billion.

==== Electricity ====
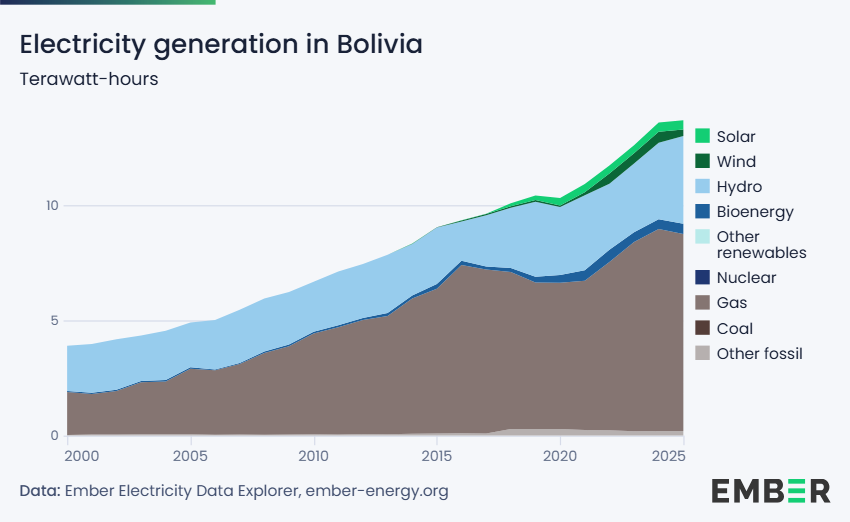
Electricity generation in Bolivia in terawatt-hours

Until 1994 the electricity sector was dominated by the vertically integrated public utility ENDE (Empresa Nacional de Electricidad). In 1994 the electricity sector was privatized and was unbundled into generation, transmission and distribution. The law aimed to increase efficiency in the sector, promote competition and encourage investment.

The supply is dominated by thermal generation (60%), while hydropower (40%) has a smaller share in its generation mix compared to other South American countries (Latin America and the Caribbean, or LAC, average hydropower capacity is 51%). The electricity coverage in rural areas is with 30% among the lowest in Latin America and improving it represents a major challenge in the future and requires the joint efforts from both the public and private sectors. Like in other countries, Bolivia's electricity sector consists of a National Interconnected System (SIN) and off-grid systems (known as the Aislado).

=== Transportation ===
Transport in Bolivia is mostly by road. The railways were historically important in Bolivia, but now play a relatively small part in the country's transport system. Because of the country's geography, aviation is also important.

=== Telecommunications ===
Telecommunications in Bolivia includes radio, television, fixed and mobile telephones, and the Internet.

=== Water supply and sanitation ===
Comparative Trends in Poverty and Basic Service Access by Department
	Poverty (NBI)			Lack of Water Access			Lack of Sanitation Access		
Department	2012	2024	Change	2001	2024	Change	2001	2024	Change
Beni	▼ -13%	▼ -14%	▼ -22%						
Chuquisaca	▼ -17%	▼ -29%	▼ -26%						
Cochabamba	▼ -16%	▼ -12%	▼ -14%						
La Paz	▼ -15%	▼ -14%	▼ -22%						
Oruro	▼ -14%	▼ -16%	▼ -24%						
Pando	▼ -18%	▼ -20%	▼ -26%						
Potosí	▼ -15%	▼ -23%	▼ -21%						
Santa Cruz	▼ -15%	▼ -9%	▼ -29%						
Tarija	▼ -13%	▼ -12%	▼ -22%						
Bolivia	▼ -15%	▼ -14%	▼ -22%						
NBI indicates a Unsatisfied Basic Needs definition for poverty. Source: INE Bolivia, 2024 Bolivian Census

Bolivia's drinking water and sanitation coverage has greatly improved since 1990 due to a considerable increase in sectoral investment. However, the country continues to suffer from what happens to be the continent's lowest coverage levels and from low quality of services. Political and institutional instability have contributed to the weakening of the sector's institutions at the national and local levels. Two concessions to foreign private companies in two of the three largest cities—Cochabamba and La Paz/El Alto—were prematurely ended in 2000 and 2006 respectively. The country's second largest city, Santa Cruz de la Sierra, relatively successfully manages its own water and sanitation system by way of cooperatives. The government of Evo Morales intends to strengthen citizen participation within the sector. Increasing coverage requires a substantial increase of investment financing.

According to the government the main problems in the sector are low access to sanitation throughout the country; low access to water in rural areas; insufficient and ineffective investments; a low visibility of community service providers; a lack of respect of indigenous customs; "technical and institutional difficulties in the design and implementation of projects"; a lack of capacity to operate and maintain infrastructure; an institutional framework that is "not consistent with the political change in the country"; "ambiguities in the social participation schemes"; a reduction in the quantity and quality of water due to climate change; pollution and a lack of integrated water resources management; and the lack of policies and programs for the reuse of wastewater.

== Labor and welfare ==
The economic downturn of the late 1990s, coupled with privatization and austerity efforts led by President Mesa, resulted in significant unemployment. Although the Bolivian government does not keep unemployment statistics, outside experts estimated unemployment to be between 8 and 10 percent of the population, as of 2006. Underemployment of Bolivia's workforce of nearly 4 million is also widespread. As a result of shortage of formal employment opportunities 83.9 percent of the workforce was informally employed in 2024.

Labor unions have a strong history in Bolivia, and many workers in the formal sector belong to unions. The larger unions, such as the Bolivian Labor Federation and the Trade Union Federation of Bolivian Mine Workers, have been successful in rallying workers to countless strikes and work stoppages. Nevertheless, working conditions for most Bolivian workers are difficult.

These conditions are even more critical as far as the informal sector is concerned. In fact, Bolivia has been listed in the 2014 U.S. Department of Labor's report on child labor and forced labor among the 74 countries where instances of such practices have been observed. According to the List of Goods Produced by Child Labor or Forced Labor issued under this report, Bolivia resorts to these practices in the agricultural sector as well as in the mining industry until this day. The DOL has also reported that "The [Bolivian] Government's National Plan to Eradicate Child Labor expired in 2010 and has not been updated."

== Foreign economic relations ==
=== Foreign exchange reserves ===
The amount in reserve currencies and gold held by Bolivia's Central Bank advanced from 1.085 billion US dollars in 2000, under Hugo Banzer Suarez's government, to 15.282 billion US dollars in 2014 under Evo Morales' government. By 2022, a large part of the currency reserves had been used up, at which point they still stood at just under US$3.8 billion. In the course of 2023, they fell to less than US$500 million, with the country facing a liquidity crisis.

Foreign-exchange reserves 2000–2022 (MM US$)

Fuente: Banco Central de Bolivia, Gráfica elaborada por: Wikipedia.

=== Trade agreements ===
Bolivia's trade with neighboring countries is growing, in part because of several regional preferential trade agreements it has negotiated. Bolivia was a founding member of the Andean Group, a South American organization designed to promote trade among Bolivia, Colombia, Ecuador, Peru, and Venezuela. Subsequently renamed the Andean Community, the organization has succeeded in increasing intra-South American trade. Trade among member countries rose from US$3.6 billion in 1991 to US$10.3 billion in 2003.

Bolivia also belongs to the Common Market of the South (Mercado Común del Sur—Mercosur). Bolivia became an associate member in March 1997 to open investment opportunities with the founding Mercosur countries (Argentina, Brazil, Paraguay, and Uruguay), as well as other Mercosur associate members (Chile, Colombia, Ecuador, Peru, and Venezuela). The agreement provides for the gradual creation of a free trade area covering at least 80% of the trade between the parties over a 10-year period, though economic crises in the region have derailed progress at integration. The U.S. Andean Trade Preference and Drug Enforcement Act (ATPDEA) allows (allowed?) numerous Bolivian products to enter the United States free of duty on a unilateral basis, including alpaca and llama products and, subject to a quota, cotton textiles. Bolivia conducted more than US$1 billion in trade with Mercosur countries in 2003. As a result of negotiations initiated in 1999 on a possible South American Free Trade Area (SAFTA), Mercosur and the Andean Community of Nations announced in December 2004 that they would merge, creating a Union of South American Nations modeled after the European Union.

=== Imports and exports ===
Exports of Bolivia by product category (2019) Chemical products Transportation Machines Mineral products Plastics and rubbers Metals Foodstuffs Precious metals Textiles Instruments Animal products Vegetable products Paper goods Footwear and headwear Miscellaneous Stone and glass Wood products Animal and vegetable bi-products Animal hides Arts and antiques Weapons

Bolivian tariffs are low; however, manufacturers complain that the tax-rebate program that allows some companies to claim refunds of import taxes on capital equipment is inefficient, with many companies now owed millions of dollars by the Bolivian Government, which can take years to recover.

Bolivian imports of goods were valued at about US$6.52 billion in 2020, while service imports were valued at about US$2.55 billion in 2019.

Bolivia enjoyed an estimated $500 million goods trade surplus in 2020. Leading sources of Bolivian imports include China, Brazil, Chile, Peru, and Argentina, with its top imports refined petroleum, cars, pesticides, delivery trucks, and raw iron bars.

Bolivian exports of goods and services in 2020 stood at US$7.02 billion compared with US$1.9 billion in 2003.

Increased production of hydrocarbons, especially natural gas, led Bolivia's trade upturn in 2004. A 20-year supply contract with Brazil for natural gas, ending in 2019, the necessary capital to increase production. In 2004 export revenues for natural gas topped US$619 million. Bolivia also exported significant quantities of petroleum. Beyond hydrocarbons, other significant exports included zinc, soya, iron ore, and tin. In 2001 Brazil overtook the United States as Bolivia's primary export outlet. Switzerland, Venezuela, and Colombia are also important export partners. Bolivia has actively sought to foster economic connections in South America after long relying on the United States as its primary trade partner.

The United States remains one of Bolivia's largest trading partners; however, it faded greatly on Brazil benefit in 2012. In 2002, the United States exported $283 million of merchandise to Bolivia and imported $162 million. Bolivia's major exports to the United States are tin, gold, jewelry, and wood products. Its major imports from the United States are computers, vehicles, wheat, and machinery. A Bilateral Investment Treaty between the United States and Bolivia came into effect in 2001, however the Treaty was terminated by the government of Bolivia in 2012.

By 2004 Bolivia had become the market leader in the export of brazil nuts, with thousands of local people involved in collecting the pods in Bolivian Amazonia.

=== Balance of trade ===
Bolivia had an estimated trade surplus of more than US$1.6 billion in 2011. This figure represents a marked change in Bolivia's economic balance sheet. Bolivia reached a peak trade deficit of US$888 million in 1998 before increased hydrocarbon exports radically altered the situation.

Bolivia had a large negative balance of payments for 2002⎯US$317 million. However, this situation has been remedied by the vast increase in export revenue. Estimates for the balance of payments for 2004 show a record surplus of US$126 million. Bolivia's external debt totaled an estimated US$5.7 billion in 2004. The International Monetary Fund has assisted Bolivia in paying down this debt. In 1995 the United States, among other countries, reduced Bolivia's debt by two-thirds.

=== Foreign investment ===
Foreign investment in Bolivia was buoyed in 1995 by privatization. Investment in mining and natural gas extraction increased, as did investment in the banking sector. However, the economic decline of the late 1990s, along with political unrest, caused foreign investors to pull out of Bolivia once again. In 2000 foreign investors contributed US$736 million to the Bolivian economy. In 2002 this total fell to US$676 million.

The Government of Bolivia remains heavily dependent on foreign assistance to finance development projects. At the end of 2002, the government owed $4.5 billion to its foreign creditors, with $1.6 billion of this amount owed to other governments and most of the balance owed to multilateral development banks. Most payments to other governments have been rescheduled on several occasions since 1987 through the Paris Club mechanism. External creditors have been willing to do this because the Bolivian Government has generally achieved the monetary targets set by International Monetary Fund programs since 1987, though economic problems in recent years have undercut Bolivia's normally good track record. Rescheduling agreements granted by the Paris Club have allowed the individual creditor countries to apply very soft terms to the rescheduled debt. As a result, some countries have forgiven substantial amounts of Bolivia's bilateral debt. The U.S. Government reached an agreement at the Paris Club meeting in December 1995 that reduced by 67% Bolivia's existing debt stock. The Bolivian Government continues to pay its debts to the multilateral development banks on time. Bolivia is a beneficiary of the Heavily Indebted Poor Countries (HIPC) and Enhanced HIPC debt relief programs, which by agreement restricts Bolivia's access to new soft loans. Bolivia was one of three countries in the Western hemisphere selected for eligibility for the Millennium Challenge Account and is participating as an observer in free trade agreement negotiations. Bolivia enjoys some financial assistance programs run by the World Bank and Microenterprise Development programs provided by Five Talents International.

==== Mutun iron ore project ====
In 2007, India's third-largest steel manufacturer, Jindal Steel and Power Limited, signed a contract with the Bolivian government to exploit the Mutun iron ore deposit, considered to be one of the largest in the world. According to the contract, Jindal would invest US$1.5 billion initially and an additional US$2.5 billion over the next eight years. This is the single largest investment by an Indian firm in Latin America. Jindal Steel will set up an integrated 1.7 MTPA steel plant, a 6 MTPA sponge iron plant, a 10 MTPA iron ore pellet plant and a 450 MW power plant. By September 2011, Jindal had obtained clearance for the project from the EIA and had hired an engineering consultant for FEED work. The project is expected to create 6,000 jobs directly and another 15,000 indirectly.

As of June 2011, Jindal had invested only US$20 million on the project due to considerable delay by Bolivian authorities in issuing land for the project and due to inability of the Bolivian government to commit 8 million cubic meters of natural gas per day for the power plant and ore smelting process. In 2012 Jindal exited Bolivia, prompting Bolivia to seize the bond. In 2014, international arbitration awarded Jindal $22.5 Million due to Bolivia's seizure of the bond.

== See also ==
- List of companies of Bolivia
- Bolivia and the International Monetary Fund
- Bolivian boliviano
- Bolivian Workers' Center
- Central Bank of Bolivia
- Child labor in Bolivia
- Corruption in Bolivia
- Human trafficking in Bolivia
- Ministry of Economy (Bolivia)
- Narcotics in Bolivia
- Prostitution in Bolivia
- Economy of South America
- List of Latin American and Caribbean countries by GDP growth
- List of Latin American and Caribbean countries by GDP (nominal)
- List of Latin American and Caribbean countries by GDP (PPP)
