= List of companies of Bolivia =

Location of Bolivia

Bolivia is a landlocked country located in western-central South America. The capitals of Bolivia are La Paz and Sucre. As of 2022, the population of Bolivia is estimated to be around 12 million, with the major ethnic group being Mestizo. The largest city in Bolivia is Santa Cruz de la Sierra.

== Notable firms ==
This list includes notable companies with primary headquarters located in the country. The industry and sector follow the Industry Classification Benchmark taxonomy. Organizations that have ceased operations are included and noted as defunct.

Notable companies Status: P=Private, S=State; A=Active, D=Defunct
Name	Industry	Sector	Headquarters	Founded	Notes	Status	
Aerocon	Consumer services	Airlines	Santa Cruz de la Sierra	2005	Defunct 2015	P	D
Aeroeste	Consumer services	Airlines	Santa Cruz de la Sierra	1994	Air charter	P	A
AeroSur	Consumer services	Airlines	Santa Cruz de la Sierra	1992	Defunct 2012	P	D
Agencia Boliviana de Correos	Industrials	Delivery services	La Paz	2018	Postal services	S	A
Banco BISA	Financials	Bank	La Paz	1963	Owned by Grupo Financiero BISA S.A.	P	A
Banco de Crédito de Bolivia	Financials	Bank	La Paz	1994	Owned by Banco de Crédito del Perú	P	A
Banco Económico	Financials	Bank	La Paz	1991	Provides financial services	P	A
Banco Mercantil Santa Cruz	Financials	Bank	La Paz	1905	Largest bank in Bolivia by assets	P	A
Banco Nacional de Bolivia	Financials	Bank	Sucre	1872	Consumer and corporate banking	P	A
Boliviana de Aviación	Consumer services	Airlines	Cochabamba	2007	Airline	P	A
Bolivian Stock Exchange	Financials	Financial services	La Paz	1989	Stock exchange	P	A
Central Bank of Bolivia	Financials	Banks	La Paz	1928	Central bank	S	A
EcoJet	Consumer services	Airlines	Cochabamba	2013	Domestic airline	P	A
Empresa Nacional de Electricidad	Utilities	Electricity	Cochabamba	1962	Electricity supplier	S	A
Entel	Telecommunications	Telecommunications service providers	La Paz	1965	Internet and telecommunications	S	A
Industrias de Aceite	Consumer staples	Miscellaneous consumer staple goods	Santa Cruz de la Sierra	1944	Owned by Alicorp	P	A
LaMia	Consumer services	Airlines	Santa Cruz de la Sierra	2014	Defunct 2016	P	D
Línea Aérea Amaszonas	Consumer services	Airlines	Santa Cruz de la Sierra	1998	Owned by NELLAAirlines Group	P	A
Lloyd Aéreo Boliviano	Consumer services	Airlines	Cochabamba	1925	Defunct 2010	P	D
Northeast Bolivian Airways	Consumer services	Airlines	Cochabamba	1970	Defunct 2006	P	D
Quantum Motors	Automobiles and parts	Automobiles	Cochabamba	2017	Electric car manufacturing	P	A
Transportes Aéreos Bolivianos	Consumer services	Airlines	Cochabamba	1977	Cargo airline	P	A
Viva	Telecommunications	Telecommunications service providers	La Paz	1999	Wireless carrier	P	A
Yacimientos Petrolíferos Fiscales Bolivianos	Energy	Integrated Oil and Gas	La Paz	1936	Supplier of oil and natural gas	S	A
