= Banco BISA =

Bank and finance service in La Paz, Bolivia

Banco BISA S.A.

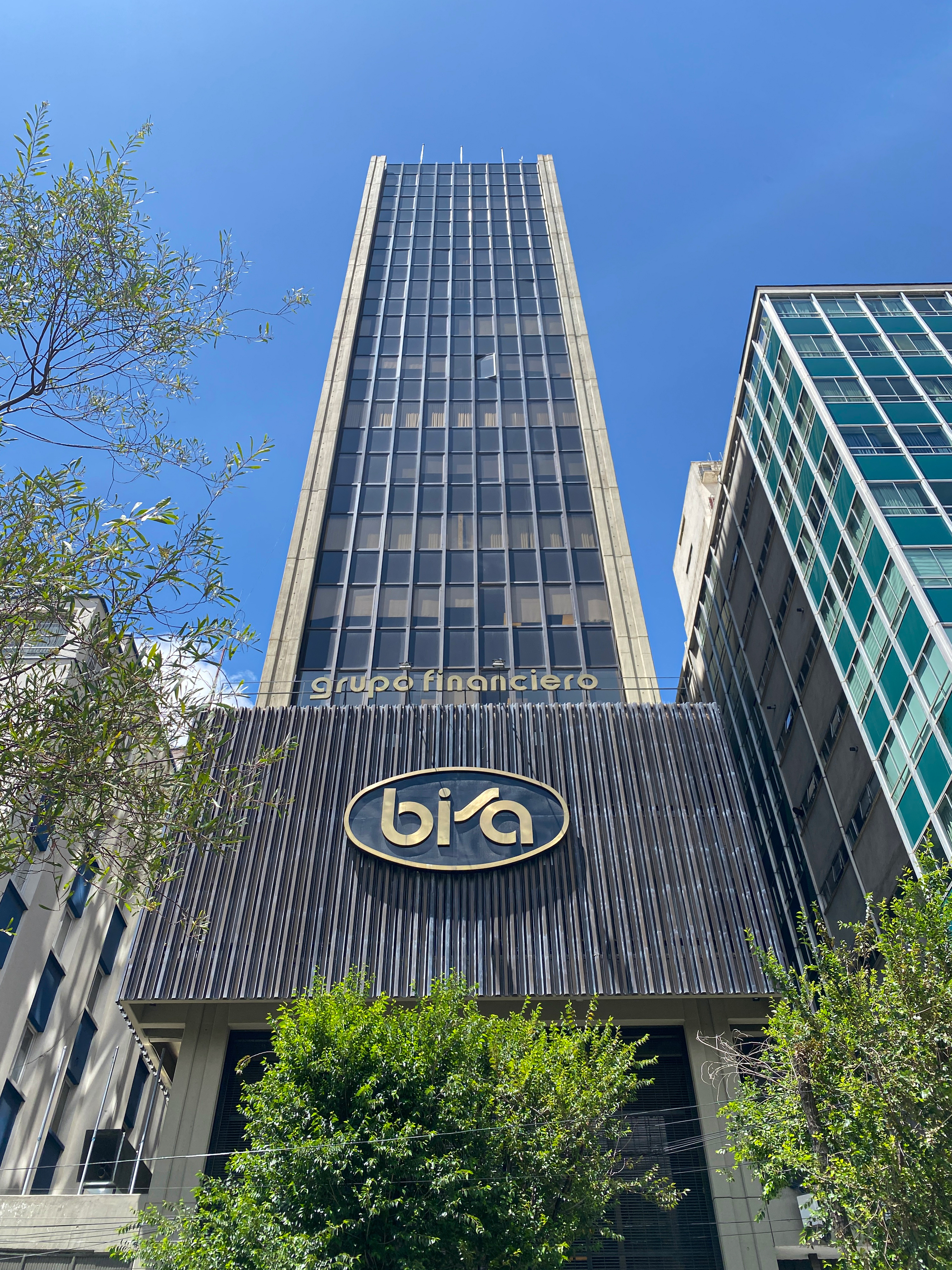
- Headquarters in La Paz
- Company type: Sociedad Anónima. Also Subsidiary of Grupo Financiero BISA
- Traded as: BBV: BIS
- Industry: Banking, Financial services
- Founded: 5 July 1963
- Headquarters: La Paz, Bolivia
- Key people: Julio Cesar León Prado (Chairman), Julio Jaime Urquidi Gumucio (Vice President)
- Products: Consumer banking, corporate banking, credit cards, insurance, investment banking, mortgage loans, risk management.
- Revenue: ▲ Bs. 651 million (2014)
- Operating income: ▲ Bs. 440 million (2014)
- Net income: ▲ Bs. 292 million (2014)
- Total assets: ▲ Bs. 16.71 billion (2014)
- Number of employees: 2,033 (2014)
- Parent: Grupo Financiero BISA S.A.
- Website: https://www.bisa.com

Banco BISA S.A., formerly known as Banco Industrial S.A. is a Bolivian banking and financial services company headquartered in La Paz. Founded on 5 July 1963, Banco BISA became Bolivia's third largest bank by assets. The bank provides its products and services through operating 66 banking centers, 280 ATMs, call centers, and online and mobile banking platforms.

The bank is a division of Grupo Financiero BISA S.A., a group which comprises BISA Seguros y Reaseguros S.A., an insurance and reinsurance division, La Vitalicia Seguros y Reaseguros de Vida S.A., which specializes in life insurance, BISA Leasing S.A., a leasing entity BISA Agencia de Bolsa S.A., a brokerage house and BISA Sociedad Administradora de Fondos de Inversión S.A., which specializes in the investment and administration of funds.

== History ==
Banco BISA was founded on 5 July 1963 as Banco Industrial S.A. (BISA). Later the bank changed its business name to Banco BISA S.A. The bank expanded its network of branches shortly after its founding. Currently, the bank operates in all nine departments of Bolivia including in small towns such as Copacabana, Puerto Suárez and Yacuíba.

In 2015, Banco BISA inaugurated its new regional headquarters in the city of Cobija. The new headquarters is the first green building in the Pando Department and one of the few in the nation.

== Businesses ==
Banco BISA offers a range of financial services and products to its individual and corporate customer base including savings accounts, credit cards, mortgages, commercial loans, investment management and microfinance services.

== Corporate affairs ==
=== Board of directors ===
- Julio César León Prado (Chairman)
- Julio Jaime Urquidi Gumucio (First Vice President)
- Alfredo Arana Rück (Second Vice President)
- Ramiro Guevara Rodriguez (Director)
- Wolfgang Leander Barber (Director)
- Tomás Barrios Santiváñez (Secretary)
- Oscar García Canseco (Syndic)
