= Bolivia and the International Monetary Fund =

Bolivia joined the IMF on December 27, 1945. Since 1945, Bolivia has cooperated with the IMF to achieve social reforms and economic growth. These efforts have involved strategies to reduce poverty, increase social equity, improve the education system and healthcare system, and expand social services to rural populations and underserved urban communities. Since 1984, Bolivia has been an active client of the fund, accessing 19 credit lines with the fund since joining.

As of December 2019, the country has no outstanding balance with the IMF, as the country is pulling away from what it says is foreign control of its economy.

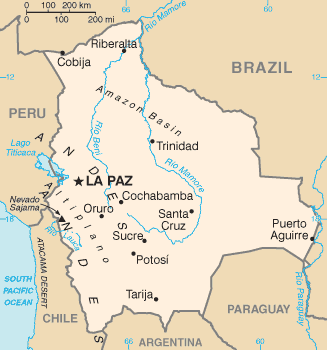
Map of Bolivia

== National economy and revolution of the 1950s ==
After the overthrow of the mining elite who had dominated political life in Bolivia, the new government reorganized the economy to create an economy that was fair. It therefore increased spending on public programs and nationalized key industries, like mining and oil. Bolivia's first stabilization plan took place from 1955 to 1964. This generated growth in the economy, as commodities like tin paid well and were needed in other countries to make finished goods, so therefore demand was high.

== Bolivia's Economy from the 1960s to the late '70s ==
High government spending and an influx of foreign capital as well as actual growth, gave the Bolivian economy impressive growth. By 1974, there was a surplus of 8.5% in GDP, but failing to re-invest it in the economy later caused problems.

Instead of funding economic activities, the state continued to expand public spending, amassing large amounts of foreign debt. As the economy was not strong enough to fund these programs, the government turned to foreign loans from banks and public institutions. Apart from its deficit financing, Bolivia remained overwhelmingly dependent on commodity exports, specifically tin and silver, making it highly susceptible to market changes.

== Late 1970s through the 1980s; the IMF's initial approach ==
Due to high public spending by the government, the Bolivian economy began to spiral. A decline in tax collection and the accumulation of foreign loans forced the state to find alternate ways to finance the deficit. The government responded by printing large sums of money, which led to high levels of inflation; by 1985 the inflation rate was around 11,750 percent.

This created more problems, as citizens became unwilling to hold money in the Bolivian peso due to the instability of its exchange rate. Bolivian banks began to pay out in dollars, as citizens feared the peso was worthless as its value fluctuated with an unpredictable market. The government was no longer in direct control of the country's currency. In order to slow down inflation, the government attempted to devalue the peso, and imposed Dollarization programs to buy back the foreign capital and replace it with pesos. This, however, had little success. Instead, black market premiums surged and inflation continued to grow.

During this time period, the price of non-fuel commodity goods, such as tin, sharply decreased. Bolivia's economy remained reliant on commodities, therefore the price drop destabilized the economy. There was a 10% decline in real GDP from 1980–85.

After the Bolivian government expelled its executive in 1978, the IMF and Bolivia began contracting a potential plan to re-stabilize the economy. The IMF, however, pulled out, as they did not believe that the government was strong enough to enforce the changes needed to revitalize the economy.

== IMF intervention and reforms from 1985–1998 ==
With a deteriorating economy, high debt, and high inflation, the Bolivian state had no choice but to turn to the IMF. Under the Structural Adjustment Facility (SAF), the IMF approved a deal on June 19, 1986 to help stabilize Bolivia's economy. Along with many other nations, Bolivia participated in the Brady Plan restructuring agreements of the 1980s, utilizing dollar denominated bond conversion mechanisms to resolve its debt crisis. Apart from repaying the $96,800,000 loan, Bolivia was asked to reduce government spending, liberalize the economy by opening up trade, raising exports and reducing imports, and regaining control of inflation. Bolivia was more or less successful in the implementation of most programs, and even went as far as declaring a state of emergency to keep control of the economy when opposition became strong.

Throughout this time, the IMF continued to lend large amounts of money to the Bolivian state, through the General Resources account as well as through the Poverty Reduction Trust, which lends only to the poorest member states of the IMF. These loans were used to stabilize the Bolivian economy by providing much-needed capital to repay private loans and revamp crucial economic practices. From 1985 to 1999, the IMF loaned Bolivia around $458,093,000 SDR in combined general loans, and through the Poverty Reduction Trust.

== Debt relief of 1996 ==
Poor indebted states like Bolivia have struggled to balance their payments due to a high number of loans, both private and public. The need to maintain good credit to access new loans, in order to pay back old loans, is a cycle that keeps these states indebted. In 1996 the IMF and the World Bank created the HIPC Initiative (Heavily Indebted Poor Countries), to lower the high debts acquired by the poorest states in the world. Bolivia qualified for adjustments and was able to forgo a portion of its debt.

On September 9, 1997 the IMF approved Bolivia's debt relief program by relinquishing around $428 million of Bolivia's external debt. The conditions for obtaining such debt relief are similar to IMF conditions for loans -- the state must continue to work at bettering its balance of payments and regulating inflation.

== Outcomes of IMF intervention (1986–1998) ==
By 1990 IMF programs had successfully reduced 12 month inflation to 18%, by 1997 the government had reduced inflation to 7%. An admirable feat, as at its peak in 1985, inflation had amounted to 23,500%. IMF intervention increased Bolivia's credit worthiness, as well as foreign investment, allowing for moderate growth. Between 1994 and 2001, Bolivia received approximately $178 million in loan disbursements from the IMF Poverty Reduction and Growth Trust. The IMF continued to regularly provide analyses evaluating the performance of Bolivia's domestic financial institutions, including in domestic bank restructuring and pension reform.

=== Effects on the people ===
The programs by the IMF and the Bolivian government affected a large portion of Bolivia's poor. To better conditions, the government planned to increase spending on education, health care, improve the efficiency of governmental programs, and better the education system by paying teachers based on their merit, to increase the quality of instructors.

However the strategies of implementation also negatively affected the population. The privatization of government industries left many without jobs. Opening up trade networks to other states also left small Bolivian companies at a disadvantage where people were let go due to foreign competitors, leading to unemployment.

== Bolivia and the IMF 1999–2005 ==
The Bolivian economy was becoming stable, but IMF involvement was not yet finished. In this time period, the IMF disbursed around $139,536,500 SDR in loans, aimed to continue the progress created by previous programs.

=== Strategy of reforms ===
The strategy was to continue to reduce inflation, reduce poverty by increasing spending in social programs, privatisation of all remaining government-owned companies, decrease participation in the informal economy, and improve governmental institutions such as the judiciary branch.

Another crucial part of the second phase of reforms was to increase reserves of foreign currency. A big problem of the 1980s was that Bolivia simply had no foreign currency to repay debts, spiraling them into further debt. The IMF looked to stop this from happening again.

Reforming the tax system was another goal of the Bolivian government, modernizing the tax system to improve the liberalization of domestic markets was crucial to continue repaying back loans as well as keeping up with spending on social programs. An important feature was phasing out the financial transaction taxes that affected business transactions in Bolivia, as well as increase the efficiency of the tax collection system.

== Outcomes of the 1999–2004 reforms ==
Although inflation and positive growth were standard throughout most of the 1990s into the early 2000s, on the whole IMF policy did not lead to a complete turn around of the Bolivian economy.

=== What caused the failures of the programs ===
Blame for the shortcomings of implementation can be attributed to both the IMF and the Bolivian government. The Bolivian government remained inefficient and unwilling to impose unpopular reforms; the government also struggled with political corruption, and political interference by the people, and opposition to the reforms. The IMF also failed to force the state to implement all proposed programs, as well as increase government productivity by forcing the state to implement legislation that would improve efficiency.

Breaches of previously agreed programs peaked starting 2001 through 2004, when many points in the performance criteria were not met, compared to the previous years where most if not all reached minimum satisfactory marks.

=== Consequences of failing to implement such programs ===
The Bolivian economy stopped its 4% growth trend and began to contract. By 1999 growth in GDP was reduced to .4%. There was a sharp decrease in foreign investment by 30%, as well as an increase in foreign debt. Debt increased from 41% of GDP in 2001, to around 73% at the end of 2003.

== Bolivia and the IMF 2005–present ==
In December 2005, Bolivia and 18 other countries received 100% debt relief as a consequence of the Multilateral Debt Relief Initiative. With the aid from this initiative, the Bolivian government paid off its loans to the IMF through repurchases and repayments between 2005 and 2007. The IMF forgave Bolivia of $251 million, coinciding with the election of Evo Morales. With the victory of Morales, an indigenous leader, Bolivia saw an opportunity to claim independence from the IMF.

No new arrangements have been made with the IMF since 2005. Bolivia has continued its battle with reducing poverty and balancing out the economy, and Bolivia's GDP and foreign revenues have grown steadily. GDP grew consistently at around 4.8% from 2004 to 2017. Growth has not been supported by programs similar to those prescribed by the IMF, however. Instead the state has again nationalized key industries and kept up with social spending to improve the lives of its citizens and reducing extreme poverty. As of December 2019, Bolivia has no outstanding debts to the IMF. The IMF continues to evaluate the Bolivian economy's economic performance, citing its hydrocarbon and mining export performance as responsible for economic growth and fiscal revenue.

== Criticisms ==
Protests have occurred in Bolivia in relation to IMF and World Bank related market reforms, loan conditions, and structural adjustments. Criticisms have been levied toward the IMF regarding its motives, actions and ties to U.S. foreign interests. Social tensions have been attributed to frustrations regarding the lack of demonstrable economic improvement expected of structural reform. In 1998, the Bolivian government agreed to the privatization of "all remaining public enterprises," including water and gas. The companies that gained ownership of the water resources increased prices. Domestic unrest resulted in the Cochabamba Water War. Discontent with austerity measures and privatization has resulted in protests that have been met with the use of state emergency measures. In 2000, large waves of protests erupted from rural Bolivians over public sector cutbacks, a decline in per capita income, and rising rates of unemployment. With the election of Evo Morales to the Bolivian presidency in 2006, the Bolivian government pursued economic growth and financial stability with the intent to distance its relationship to international lending institutions, specifically the IMF and World Bank.
