= Human trafficking in Bolivia =

Bolivia ratified the 2000 UN TIP Protocol in May 2006.

In 2010, Bolivia was a source country for men, women, and children who were subjected to human trafficking, specifically conditions of forced prostitution and forced labor within the country or abroad. A large number of Bolivians were found in conditions of forced labor in Argentina, Brazil, Chile, Peru, Spain, and the United States in sweatshops, factories, and agriculture. Within the country, young Bolivian women and girls from rural areas were subjected to forced prostitution in urban areas. Members of indigenous communities, particularly in the Chaco region, were at risk of forced labor within the country. A significant number of Bolivian children were subjected to conditions of forced labor in mining, agriculture, and as domestic servants, and reports indicated some parents sold or rented out their children for forced labor in mining and agriculture near border areas with Peru. The country's porous borders facilitated the movement of undocumented migrants, some of whom may have been trafficked. In one case, Bolivian authorities identified 26 Haitian children who were en route to Brazil for possible forced labor and forced prostitution.

In 2010, the Government of Bolivia did not fully comply with the minimum standards for the elimination of trafficking; however, it made significant efforts to do so. The government maintained significant law enforcement efforts against sex trafficking crimes, although it did not increase convictions of trafficking offenders, which remained disproportionately low compared with the high numbers of trafficking victims identified by Bolivian authorities. The government did not show evidence of adequately addressing forced labor, and services available to individuals subjected to forced labor and repatriated Bolivians who were trafficked abroad were generally lacking. While many of Bolivia's anti-trafficking initiatives remained dependent on international donor funding, the government has initiated a project to significantly dedicate more law enforcement officers and prosecutors toward the investigation prosecution of trafficking offenses over the next year.

The U.S. State Department's Office to Monitor and Combat Trafficking in Persons placed the country on the "Tier 2 Watchlist" in 2017 and 2023.

== Prosecution (2010) ==
The Government of Bolivia sustained anti-trafficking law enforcement efforts over the last year, though it did not demonstrate increased efforts to prosecute and punish trafficking offenders. The government prohibits all forms of human trafficking through Law 3325, an anti-trafficking law enacted in 2006, which prescribes penalties of 8 to 12 years’ imprisonment. These penalties are sufficiently stringent and commensurate with penalties prescribed under Bolivian law for other serious crimes such as rape.

A draft law submitted to Bolivia's Congress over the past year would enhance the government's ability to conduct thorough investigations and improve victims’ access to specialized services. The Bolivian national police investigated 288 cases suspected of involving human trafficking in 2009, a 26 percent increase over investigations initiated during the preceding year. The Bolivian government reported 21 prosecutions initiated and seven trafficking offenders convicted in 2009; three convicted offenders were given suspended sentences and released, while the other sentences ranged from three to 12 years.

These actions compare with 64 prosecutions initiated and seven convictions obtained in 2008. The majority of the government's anti-trafficking law enforcement efforts focused on the commercial sexual exploitation of children, and no charges were filed for labor trafficking offenses. The government continued to operate four specialized anti-trafficking police units in La Paz, El Alto, Santa Cruz, and Cochabamba, and made preparations to open an additional six units along the frontiers with Brazil, Argentina, and Peru in 2010 with the support of a foreign government.

Bolivian police increased targeted law enforcement operations against brothels, which resulted in the rescue of 287 children in conditions of forced prostitution, a 33 percent increase from the previous year. Some of these victims sought care in shelters, while others were reintegrated with their families. No criminal investigations or prosecutions of public officials allegedly involved with trafficking-related activity were initiated during the reporting period.

== Protection (2010) ==
The Bolivian government sustained modest efforts to protect trafficking victims over the last year. Although law enforcement officials identified child victims during police operations in brothels, the government lacks effective procedures for identifying trafficking victims among other vulnerable populations, such as child laborers.

During the past year, law enforcement officials stationed along Bolivia's borders did not systematically attempt to identify victims of trafficking among emigrating Bolivians, though reports indicate hundreds of children leave the country under suspicious circumstances each month. In larger cities, such as La Paz and Santa Cruz, the government maintains small municipal shelters capable of caring for sex trafficking victims on a short-term basis, although some shelters limit services to girls. In addition to investigating and prosecuting cases, the anti-trafficking police unit in Santa Cruz provides trafficked individuals, along with victims of domestic violence, with medical assistance and shelter and is seen as a successful model of integrated care. Municipal shelters generally cannot, however, accommodate the demand for all forms of victim services, and in practice, services are limited to women and children trafficked into commercial sexual exploitation, with minimal resources available to male victims of trafficking or victims subjected to forced labor. Child victims may receive general care at a government-operated children's shelter, and NGOs and religious groups provide additional shelter care and reintegration training programs to trafficking victims.

Temporary and long-term services for victims remain unavailable in parts of the country. The government has no dedicated programs to assist the significant numbers of Bolivians trafficked abroad and later repatriated to the country. The government encourages victims to participate in investigations and prosecutions of trafficking offenders, though victims often do not because of their fear of reprisals from traffickers. The government does not provide foreign trafficking victims with legal alternatives to deportation to countries where they may face hardship or retribution. While the government provided no specialized training in the identification of trafficking victims, other partners, including NGOs and foreign governments, provided training to police, prosecutors, and the general population.

== Prevention (2010) ==
The government sustained previous levels of prevention and public awareness efforts, largely in collaboration with international donors. Bolivian authorities continued to forge partnerships with NGOs, international organizations, and other governments on prevention activities and hosted the country's first International Trafficking in Persons conference in March 2009. No efforts to reduce demand for commercial sex acts or forced labor were reported during the year. The government provided anti-trafficking training for its troops before they deployed on international peacekeeping missions.

== See also ==
- Human rights in Bolivia
