= YPFB =

Bolivian state-owned enterprise

Yacimientos Petrolíferos Fiscales Bolivianos

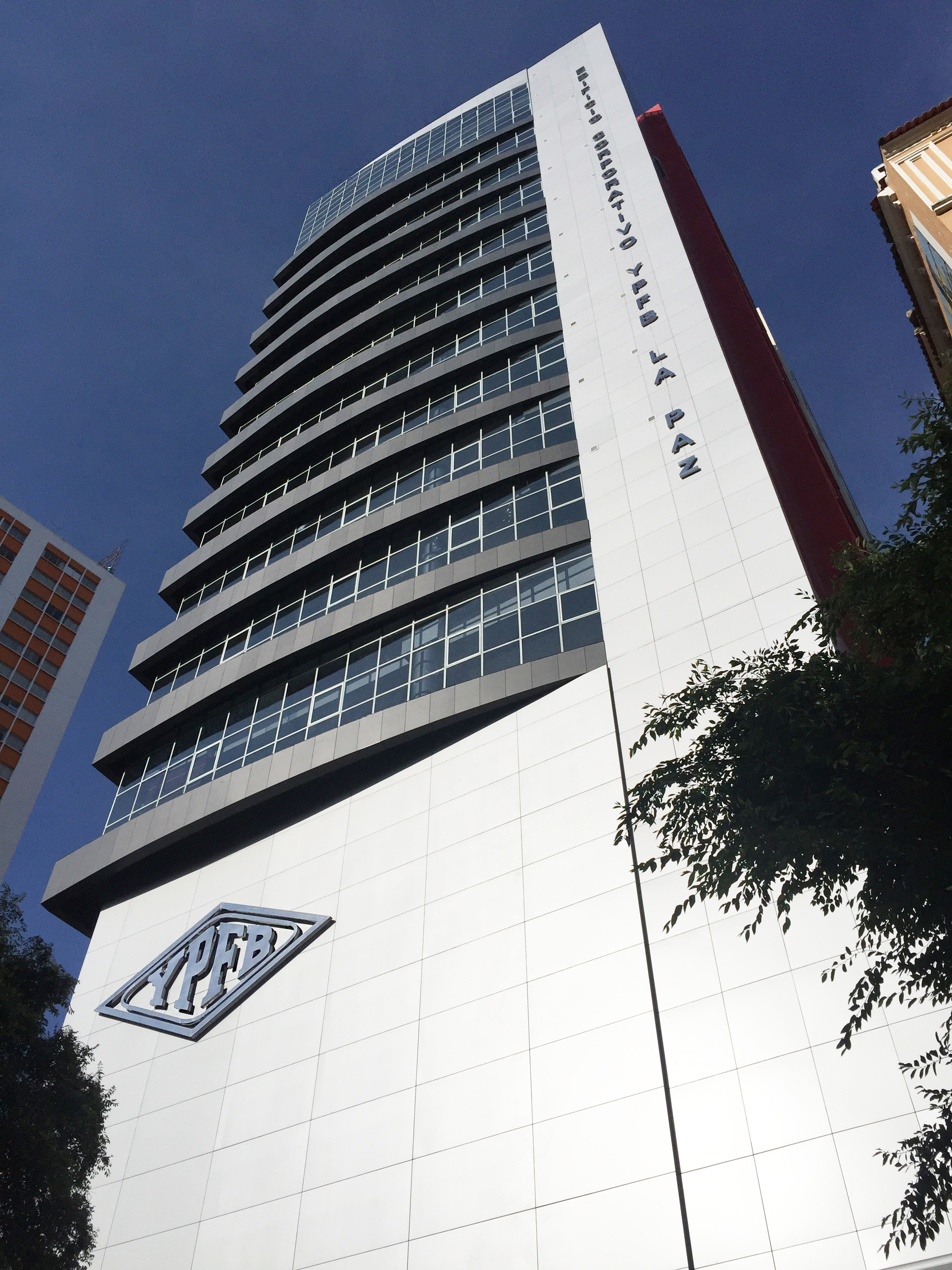
- YPFB headquarters
- Native name: Yacimientos Petrolíferos Fiscales Bolivianos
- Company type: State-owned enterprise
- Industry: Oil and gas
- Founded: December 21, 1936; 89 years ago
- Headquarters: La Paz, Bolivia
- Products: Petroleum; Refined oil products Natural gas
- Owner: Government of Bolivia
- Website: ypfb.gob.bo

Yacimientos Petrolíferos Fiscales Bolivianos (YPFB) is a Bolivian state-owned enterprise dedicated to the exploration, exploitation, refining, industrialization, distribution and commercialization of oil, natural gas and derived products. It was created on December 21, 1936 under a government decree during the presidency of David Toro. YPFB is one of the biggest corporations in Bolivia.

== History ==
Following Bolivia's defeat in the Chaco War, public outrage against Standard Oil coalesced with outrage against the Bolivian military and political classes. A core of labor movements and Chaco War veterans backed the political rise of military officers, included Colonel David Toro. Led by Toro, Bolivia followed the Argentinean model by creating a national, state-owned and run, oil company in 1936 — YPFB.

During the first presidency of Gonzalo Sánchez de Lozada, YPFB was broken up and largely sold off. "Capitalized" oil companies were formed from YPFB properties under the capitalization (privatization) reform. The biggest parts of YPFB, including existing oil and gas infrastructure, went to Chaco S.A., owned in part by Amoco (and later, British Petroleum and Argentine capital operating as Bridas). The companies were owned 80 percent by direct private investors and 20 percent by all the citizens of Bolivia over the age of 21 and resident in Bolivia. This was also the case with the capitalizations of the other four principal state-owned companies. YPFB remained at that time as a state-owned service company for the hydrocarbon sector.

Since the election of president Evo Morales, the privatized oil companies have been partially nationalized. All its subsidiaries operate as private companies, most of which trade on the Bolivian Stock Exchange, but YPFB and the government has effective control over them.
