= ENDE =

Bolivian state-owned company

Empresa Nacional de Electricidad
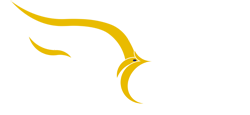
- Company type: State-owned enterprise
- Industry: Finances
- Genre: Electricity
- Founded: February 9, 1962; 64 years ago
- Headquarters: Calle Colombia 665, Cochabamba, Bolivia
- Area served: Bolivia
- Operating income: 379 million US$ (2016)
- Net income: ▲97 million US$ (2016)
- AUM: ▲24 million US$ (2016)
- Owner: Government of Bolivia
- Website: www.ende.bo/index.php

Empresa Nacional de Electricidad (ENDE) (English: National Electricity Company) is a Bolivian public company that supplies electricity based in Cochabamba, Bolivia. Is engaged in the generation, transmission and distribution of electricity in Bolivia, is supervised and regulated by the Autoridad de Fiscalización y Control Social de Electricidad.

== History ==
It was created on February 9, 1962, by means of Supreme Decree No. 5999 and constituted on December 21, 1964. On February 4, 1965, it acquired legal personality through Supreme Resolution No. 127462, and on July 16, 2008, was refounded by Supreme Decree No. 29644. Its headquarters are located in Cochabamba.

== Services ==
The company is mainly engaged in the construction of Electric Dams to generate electricity.
