= Bolivian Stock Exchange =

Stock exchange in La Paz, Bolivia

- Bolsa Boliviana de Valores

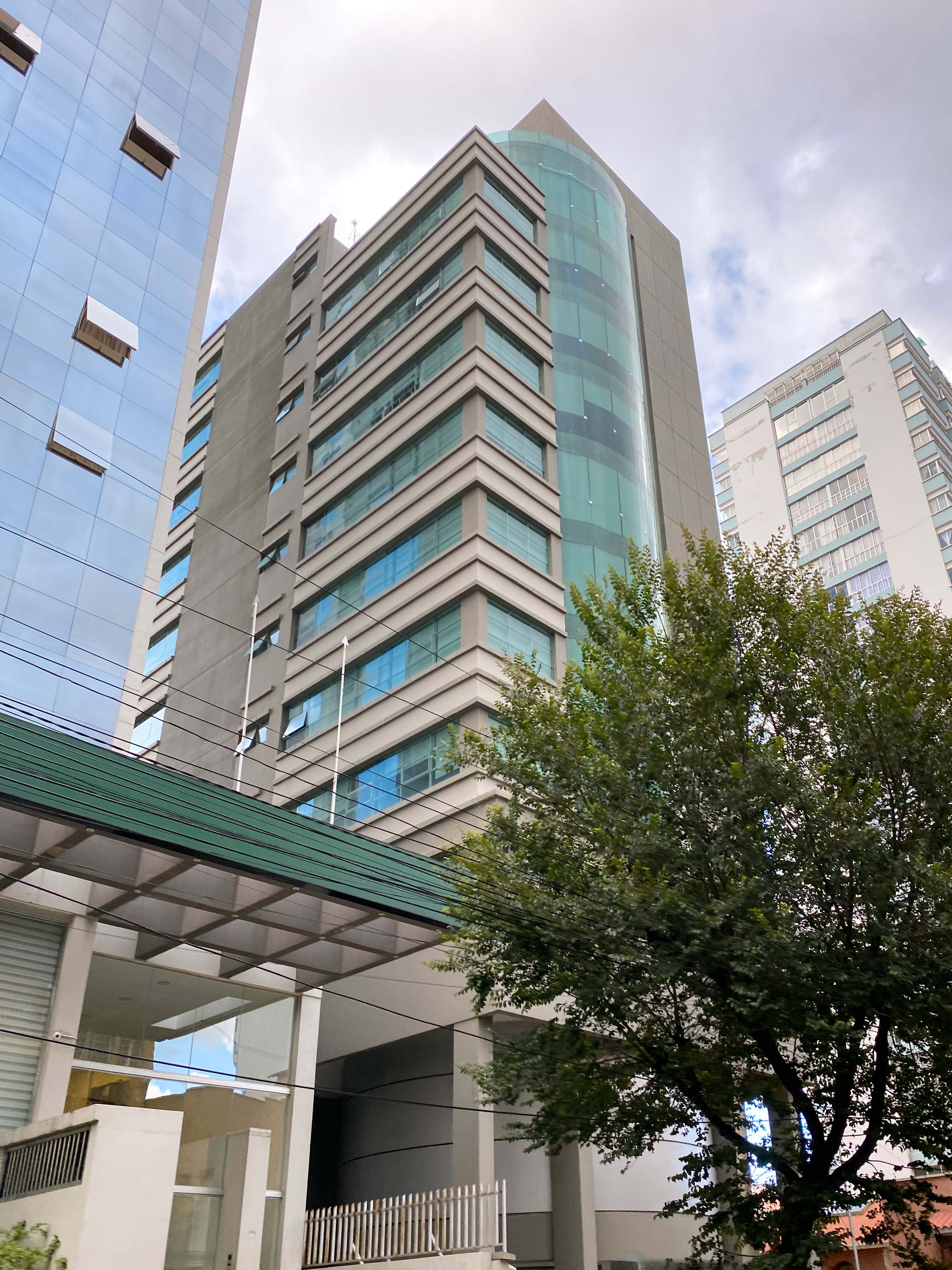
- Headquarters of the Bolivian Stock Exchange in La Paz
- Type: Stock Exchange
- Location: La Paz, Bolivia
- Founded: 1989; 37 years ago
- Currency: Bolivian boliviano
- No. of listings: 282
- Website: www.bbv.com.bo

The Bolivian Stock Exchange (known in Spanish as Bolsa Boliviana de Valores or BBV) is a stock exchange based in the city of La Paz, Bolivia. The BBV began operations in 1989, offering trading in equities, indexes, gold, and local commodities.

== History ==
The founders of the Bolivian Stock Exchange included Ernesto Wende, Oscar Parada, Gastón Guillén, Gastón Mujía, José Crespo, Luis Ergueta, and Chirveches. The President of the Confederation of Private Employers of Bolivia (CEPB), Marcelo Pérez Monasterios (later the Bolivian ambassador to the United Kingdom), called for a meeting to designate a commission to help establish the stock exchange, and the project launched on April 19, 1979, under the name Bolsa Boliviana de Valores (Bolivian Stock Exchange). The BBV began with $B1,420,000 (Bolivian weight, valid legal tender until 1987) in capital and with 71 shareholders. Upon establishment, the entity's first General Board of Shareholders approved statutes of the society and appointed Don Ernesto Wende Frankel as its first director. The board was responsible for executing the necessary formalities to obtain legal status, including approval of the statutes from the National Commission of Values, in compliance with the Code of Trade.

Between 1982 and 1985, economic conditions were not conducive to activation of trading on the Bolivian Stock Exchange. Bolivia experienced fiscal weakness and hyperinflation, increasing demands for price stability. A process was established to improve the country's economic situation, seeking to achieve stabilization and economic deflation. With improved economic conditions in 1989, a USAID program was initiated to support the stock market. It extended to the National Commission of Values and to the Bolivian Stock Exchange, and it also enabled qualification of intermediaries, preparation of regulations, and operational preparation of the market. On October 20, 1989, the Bolsa Boliviana de Valores initiated official activities.

== Organization ==
The Bolivian Stock Exchange is organized in the following structure:

- Director
- Fulfillment Official and Fulfillment Analyst
- External Legal Adviser
- General management
- Office of Management
- Sub-General Management
- Official of Information Security
- Leadership of Administration of Projects
- 7 Managements: General Management - Management of Markets – Management of Supervision and Analysis – Management of Development and Information – Management of Legal Subjects – Management of Information Technology – Management of Administration and Finances.
- 10 Area Leadership positions

== Legal framework ==
From 1989, with the start of operations of the Bolivian Stock Exchange, the Bolivian financial system initiated a period of important transformations which deepened during the 1990s, with the promulgation of the Law of Banks and Financial Entities (1993), the Law of the Central Bank of Bolivia (1995), the Law of Pensions (1996), the Law of the Stock Market (1998), and the Law of Insurance (1998).

== Sectors traded on the BBV ==
Stocks in the following sectors are traded on the Bolivian Stock Exchange:

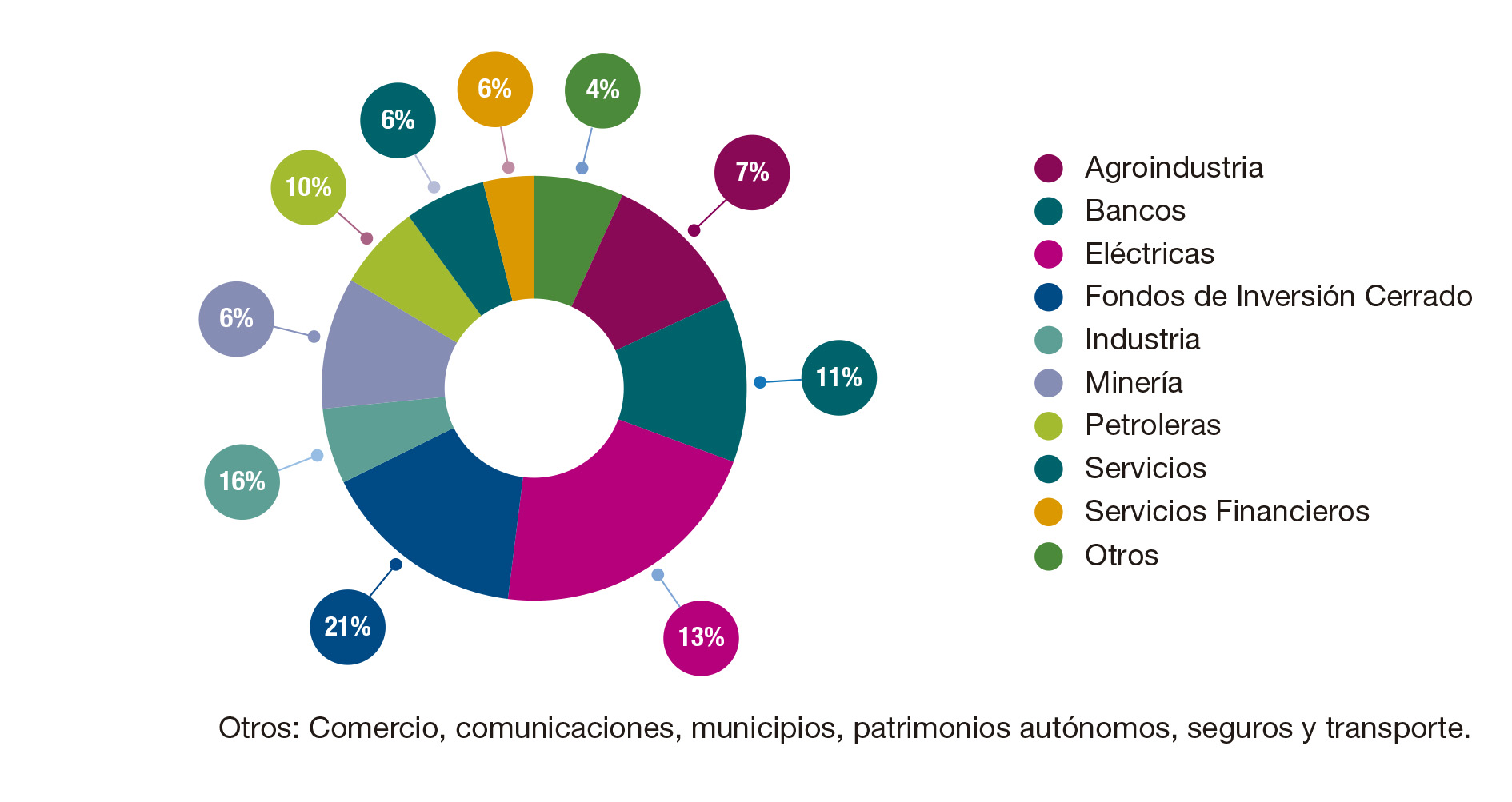

- Agro-industry
- Cooperative
- Banks
- Electrical
- Trade
- Industrial
- Oil
- Safe
- Services
- Financial services
- Transport
- Municipality
