= Timeline of strikes in 2004 =

Strikes in 2004

In 2004, a number of labour strikes, labour disputes, and other industrial actions occurred.

== Background ==
A labour strike is a work stoppage caused by the mass refusal of employees to work. This can include wildcat strikes, which are done without union authorisation, and slowdown strikes, where workers reduce their productivity while still carrying out minimal working duties. It is usually a response to employee grievances, such as low pay or poor working conditions. Strikes can also occur to demonstrate solidarity with workers in other workplaces or pressure governments to change policies.

== Timeline ==
=== Continuing strikes from 2003 ===
- Bolivian gas conflict
- 2003–04 Hazara asylum seekers hunger strike on Nauru. Hunger strike by Hazara asylum seekers from Afghanistan detained by Australia in Nauru.
- 2003–04 Kenyan universities strike. 2-month strike by university staff in Kenya over wages.
- Nursery nurses strike, in Scotland.
- Southern California supermarket strike of 2003–2004
- 2003–04 Tyson Foods strike. Year-long strike by Tyson Foods meatpackers in Jefferson, Wisconsin, United States.
- Vatukoula mine strike. 33-year strike by gold miners at the Vatukoula mine in Fiji between 1991 and 2024.

=== January ===
- Let's Save Research. Protest movement, including strike action, by scientific staff and researchers in France against research funding cuts.
- 2004 Radio France strike.
- 2004–05 Terni steelworkers strike. Strike by ThyssenKrupp steelworkers in Terni, Italy, against relocation of production facilities to Germany.

=== February ===
- 2004 Galápagos strikes. Two related strikes in the Galápagos Islands, Ecuador, the first in February by shark fishermen demanding that the government relax fishing regulations and the second in September by park rangers after the government fired the pro-conservationist park director.
- 2004 Zambia general strike. One-day general strike led by the Zambia Congress of Trade Unions in protest over austerity measures presented by Minister of Finance Ng'andu Peter Magande.

=== April ===
- 2004 Aliant strike. 5-month strike by Aliant call centre workers in Canada.
- 2004 British Columbia hospital strike. Illegal strike by hospital workers in British Columbia, Canada, against privatisation.
- 2004 Fiat strike. 3-week strike by Fiat autoworkers in Melfi, Italy.

=== June ===
- 2004 Aura-Misr strike. Strike by Aura-Misr workers in Egypt over health benefits for asbestos-related disease.
- 2004 KorAm strike. Strike by KorAm Bank workers in South Korea in response to the takeover of the bank by Citigroup, the longest in the history of the South Korean financial sector at that point.
- 2004 Norwegian oil strike

=== July ===
- 2004 Bécancour strike. Strike by Alcoa aluminium workers in Bécancour, Quebec.
- 2004 LG-Caltex strike. 18-day strike by LG-Caltex Oil Corporation workers in South Korea.

=== August ===
- 2004 Danish football strike. Strike by professional football players in Denmark, the first of the kind in Danish history.
- 2004 Indian truckers strike. 1-week strike by truckers in India against the introduction of a 10% service tax.
- 2004 Palestinian prisoners' hunger strike. 18-day hunger strike by Palestinians in Israeli custody.
- 2004 Parks Canada strike

=== September ===
- 2004 Brazilian bank strike. 1-month strike by bank workers in Brazil.
- 2004 Estonian train strike. Strike by Eesti Raudtee workers over wages, the longest strike in Estonian history at that point since the Estonian Restoration of Independence in 1991.
- 2004–05 NHL lockout
- 2004 Nippon Professional Baseball realignment, including strike action taken by players.
- September 2004 South Africa public sector strike. One-day strike by public sector workers in South Africa. One of the biggest strikes in South African history.

=== October ===
- 2004 Benin general strike. 3-day general strike in Benin for higher wages and lower university fees.
- 2004 PSAC strike. 1-week strike by federal public workers in Canada, represented by the Public Service Alliance of Canada.

=== November ===
- 2004 El Abra strike. 22-day strike by miners at the El Abra mine in Chile over wages and benefits.
- Hacienda Luisita massacre.
- 2004 Northeastern Illinois University strike. 18-day strike by Northeastern Illinois University faculty members in the United States over wages.
- November 2004 Paraguayan National Civil Strike. 8-day strike movement in Paraguay demanding land redistribution.
- 2004–05 SAQ strike. 2-month strike by Société des alcools du Québec workers.
- 2004–05 Uniden strikes. Strikes by Uniden workers in Shenzhen, China, demanding the right to form a union.

=== December ===
- 2004 Dębak hunger strikes

== Statistics ==
=== Africa ===
According to Toughedah Jacobs and Derek Yuand of the Development Policy Research Unit of the University of Cape Town, there were 1,29 million working days lost to work stoppages in South Africa in 2004, the most since the year 2000.

=== Europe ===
According to the European Foundation for the Improvement of Living and Working Conditions (Eurofound), there were 19 work stoppages in Sweden in 2004, involving 2449 workers and 15 282 working days lost.
