= Timeline of strikes in 2003 =

Strikes in 2003

In 2003, a number of labour strikes, labour disputes, and other industrial actions occurred.

== Background ==
A labour strike is a work stoppage caused by the mass refusal of employees to work. This can include wildcat strikes, which are done without union authorisation, and slowdown strikes, where workers reduce their productivity while still carrying out minimal working duties. It is usually a response to employee grievances, such as low pay or poor working conditions. Strikes can also occur to demonstrate solidarity with workers in other workplaces or pressure governments to change policies.

== Timeline ==
=== Continuing strikes from 2002 ===
- 2002–2003 Chinese protest movement
- 2002–2003 Plum Island Animal Disease Center strike, 7-month strike by Plum Island Animal Disease Center workers in the United States.
- 2000–03 prisoners' hunger strike in Turkey
- 2002–2003 United Kingdom firefighter dispute
- Vatukoula mine strike. 33-year strike by gold miners at the Vatukoula mine in Fiji between 1991 and 2024.
- 2002–2003 Venezuelan general strike

=== January ===
- 2003 Cananea strike, 16-day strike by miners at the Grupo México-owned Cananea Mine.

=== February ===
- 2003–04 Tyson Foods strike. Year-long strike by Tyson Foods meatpackers in Jefferson, Wisconsin, United States.

=== March ===
- 2003 Broadway musicians strike

=== April ===
- 2003 Frog Pubs strike. Strike by Tamil pub workers of the Frog Pubs chain in France.

=== May ===
- May 2003 Faroe Islands strike. Major strike involving around 30% of the working population of the Faroe Islands.
- Nursery nurses strike. In Scotland.
- 2003 South Korean truckers' strikes

=== June ===
- 2003 Hyundai Korea strike. 7-week strike by Hyundai Group workers in South Korea for a 40-hour work week.
- 2003 Nigerian general strike, against increases in fuel prices.

=== July ===
- 2003 protests in Dominican Republic
- 2003 Nestlé Korea strike. 145-day strike by Nestlé workers in South Korea over outsourcing.

=== September ===
- Bolivian gas conflict

=== October ===
- Southern California supermarket strike of 2003–2004
- 2003 UK postal workers' wildcat strike.

=== November ===
- 2003 French universities strike
- 2003–04 Kenyan universities strike. 2-month strike by university staff in Kenya over wages.

=== December ===
- 2003 Andina strike. 11-day strike by copper miners at the Andina mine, Chile.
- 2003–04 Hazara asylum seekers hunger strike on Nauru. Hunger strike by Hazara asylum seekers from Afghanistan detained by Australia in Nauru.
