= List of strikes in Fiji =

Throughout the history of Fiji, there have been a number of strikes, labour disputes, student strikes, hunger strikes and other industrial actions.

== 20th century ==
=== 1990s ===
- Vatukoula mine strike, 33-year strike by Vatukoula mine miners, from 1991 to 2024.
- 1993 Fiji sugar strike
- 1997 Fiji sugar strike, strike by Fiji Sugar Corporation workers over health and safety standards.
