= Carolyn Leckie =

Scottish politician (born 1965)

Member of the Scottish Parliament for Central Scotland (1 of 7 Regional MSPs)
- In office 1 May 2003 – 2 April 2007

Personal details
- Born: 5 March 1965 (age 61) Glasgow, Scotland
- Party: Scottish Socialist Party
- Children: 2
- Education: University of Strathclyde; University of Dundee
- Profession: former midwife, lawyer

Carolyn Leckie (born 5 March 1965) is a Scottish politician. She was a member of the Scottish Socialist Party (SSP), and held a number of senior positions in the party, but has since left the SSP. From 2003 to 2007 she was a Member of the Scottish Parliament (MSP) for the Central Scotland region, having been elected on the SSP list.

== Biography ==
Leckie was born on 5 March 1965 and grew up in Glasgow, the daughter of a shipyard worker. She lives in East Kilbride. Before she became an MSP she was a midwife and a local union leader who represented thousands of hospital workers in Glasgow.

== Campaigning ==
Just before election to Holyrood, she led several successful strikes against low pay - the most recent involving 300 ancillary workers against the French multinational, Sodexho. As an MSP she was a strong supporter of the Nursery Nurses campaigning for higher pay. On 20 May 2004, after attempting to raise a point of order about the strike at a time that the Presiding Officer determined was inappropriate, she was told to leave the chamber. She was active within the parliament campaigning for an end to the cuts and closures in hospital services across Scotland.

On 20 January 2005, she was jailed for seven days for non-payment of a fine, arising from a protest outside Faslane nuclear base. The Nursing and Midwifery Council did not consider it an impediment to her registration as a Midwife. In January 2007, she was arrested but not charged for taking part in an anti-nuclear demonstration at Faslane as part of the Faslane 365 campaign.

In April 2014, Leckie led a campaign against plans to demolish the Red Road Flats during the 2014 Commonwealth Games opening ceremony.

== Other information ==
Leckie was co-chair of the Scottish Socialist Party for several years. She stood down at the March 2006 annual conference, stating that it was time to hand the post over to a lay member of the party, but she was easily elected as an ordinary member of its executive committee.

She was one of several members who gave evidence in the Sheridan v News International defamation action, and the subsequent criminal trial HM Advocate v Sheridan and Sheridan. Former SSP leader Tommy Sheridan was found guilty of perjury and sentenced to three years in prison.

At the SSP conference in 2008, Leckie declined nomination for any national posts within the party, but remained an activist within the party, particularly within the Socialist Women's Network. She drifted away from the party and stopped paying subscriptions without it being noticed.

Leckie is a founder member of Women for Independence campaign for Scottish independence.

Leckie worked for a Women's Aid group from 2007 to 2014. She completed an LLB at the University of Strathclyde in 2014, continuing to work throughout. She has since gained a Diploma in Professional Legal Practice from the University of Dundee and is pursuing a law career. She has stated that she will not stand for election again.
