= Water supply and sanitation in Bolivia =

Water and sanitation in Bolivia

Data
- Access to an improved water source: 90% (2015)
- Access to improved sanitation: 50% (2015)
- Continuity of supply (%): not available
- Average urban water use (liter/capita/day): not available
- Average urban water tariff (US$/m3): not available
- Share of household metering: not available
- Share of collected wastewater treated: 25% (2000)
- Annual investment in water supply and sanitation: US$3.7/capita (2006)
- Share of self-financing by utilities: Close to zero
- Share of tax-financing: 42% (1994–2002)
- Share of external financing: 58% (1994–2002)

Institutions
- Decentralization to municipalities: Yes
- National water and sanitation company: No
- National water and sanitation regulator: Yes
- Responsibility for policy setting: Ministry of Water
- Sector law: Water and Sanitation Services Law #2066 (2000)
- Number of urban service providers: n/a
- Number of rural service providers: n/a
- All values, unless otherwise stated, are in US dollars

Bolivia's drinking water and sanitation coverage has greatly improved since 1990 due to a considerable increase in sectoral investment. However, the country continues to suffer from what happens to be the continent's lowest coverage levels and from low quality of services. Political and institutional instability have contributed to the weakening of the sector's institutions at the national and local levels. Two concessions to foreign private companies in two of the three largest cities—Cochabamba and La Paz/El Alto—were prematurely ended in 2000 and 2006 respectively. The country's second largest city, Santa Cruz de la Sierra, relatively successfully manages its own water and sanitation system by way of cooperatives. The government of Evo Morales intends to strengthen citizen participation within the sector. Increasing coverage requires a substantial increase of investment financing.

According to the government the main problems in the sector are low access to sanitation throughout the country; low access to water in rural areas; insufficient and ineffective investments; a low visibility of community service providers; a lack of respect of indigenous customs; "technical and institutional difficulties in the design and implementation of projects"; a lack of capacity to operate and maintain infrastructure; an institutional framework that is "not consistent with the political change in the country"; "ambiguities in the social participation schemes"; a reduction in the quantity and quality of water due to climate change; pollution and a lack of integrated water resources management; and the lack of policies and programs for the reuse of wastewater.

== Access ==
In 2015, in Bolivia 90% of the total population had access to "improved" water, or 97% and 76%, in urban and rural areas, respectively. Regarding sanitation, 50% of the total population had access to "improved" sanitation, or 61% and 28%, in urban and rural areas, respectively.

== Quality of service ==
The quality of service in the majority of the country's water and sanitation systems is low. In 2000, according to the WHO, in only 26% of the urban systems water was disinfected and only 25% of the collected wastewater was treated.

== Recent developments ==
In the last decades, frequent changes of government resulted in several restructurings of the institutional framework to face the problems of the sector. Consequently, it seems difficult to draw up a long-term continuous and sustainable sector policy.

=== The 1990s: Privatization and regulation ===
In 1999, during the second mandate of Hugo Banzer (1997–2001), the sectoral institutional framework law (Law 2029) established the legal framework for the sector that is in force today. It allows for private sector participation and formalized SISAB as a regulator (SISAB replaced the former Superintendencia de Agua created in 1997). During that period two major concessions for water and sanitation were granted to the private sector: One in La Paz/El Alto to the Aguas de Illimani S.A. (AISA), a subsidiary of the French Suez (formerly Lyonnaise des Eaux) in 1997; and a second one in Cochabamba to Aguas de Tunari, a subsidiary of the multinationals Biwater and Bechtel in 1999.

Following two popular uprisings against water privatization, the first in Cochabamba in April 2000 and the second in La Paz/El Alto in January 2005, which centered on natural gas concessions, the two water concessions were terminated. In the latter case, Aguas de Illimani was replaced by the public utility Empresa Pública Social de Agua y Saneamiento (EPSAS), which came under severe criticism in 2008 due to water shortages, accounting errors, tariff increases and poor disaster preparedness. Consequently, representatives of the La Paz neighborhood association announced to create their own service provider.

The Bolivian Norm NB 688, an important technical norm for the design and 40´/. water is in bolivia construction of sewage and sanitation, was revised in 2001. The revised norm permits the installation of more efficient and of lower cost condominial sewerage systems and helps to increase sanitation coverage with limited funds.

Furthermore, the government defined the National Plan for Basic Sanitation Services 2001-2010 to increase the water and sanitation access to improve the quality of service and promote their sustainability.

=== Evo Morales government: popular participation ===
In 2006 the MAS won the elections and Evo Morales became president of the Republic. "Water cannot be a private business because it converts it into a merchandise and thus violates human rights. Water is a resource and should be a public service," emphasized president-elect Morales. The new president created the Water Ministry (see below) and nominated a leader of the protests in El Alto against Aguas de Illimani as the country's first water minister. He nominated Luis Sánchez-Gómez Cuquerella, who was formerly an activist of the struggle against the privatization in Cochabamba, as vice-minister of Basic Services. In May 2006 the government dissolved the regulatory agency SISAB, saying that it failed to properly regulate tariffs and that it lacked accountability.

The government of Evo Morales considered passing a new water and sanitation services law called “Water for Life”. According to vice-minister Rene Orellana, under this law the legal concept of the concession would be eliminated. A preferential electricity tariff would be introduced for EPSAs and community water rights would be strengthened.

In 2008 the government published a National Basic Sanitation Plan that analyzes the main problems in the sector, puts forward a vision, sets targets (90% access to water and 80% access to sanitation by 2015) and defines the investments needed to achieve the targets (US$283 million per year). These figures include investments for the reuse of wastewater and to adapt to climate change.

=== 2016 Water Shortages and National Emergency ===
In November 2016, the worst drought in 25 years led to water rationing in La Paz and El Alto. Various causes were cited for the shortage, which saw the capital's main reservoir level drop to less than 1% capacity. Just two weeks into the crisis, Bolivia's Vice Ministry of Civil Defense estimated that the drought had affected 125,000 families and threatened 290,000 hectares (716,605 acres) of agricultural land and 360,000 heads of cattle. President Evo Morales called on local governments to devote funds and workers to drill wells and transport water to cities in vehicles, with the support of the armed forces, from nearby bodies of water.

A national state of emergency was declared after 172 of the country's 339 municipalities declared their own emergencies related to the drought.

== Responsibilities for water and sanitation ==
The sector's institutional framework is the Law #2029 of 1999, or Water and Sanitation Services Law, revised in 2000 as Law #2066. As mentioned above in “Recent Developments”, the Morales government is contemplating a new water and sanitation services law, named “Water for Life”.

=== Policies ===
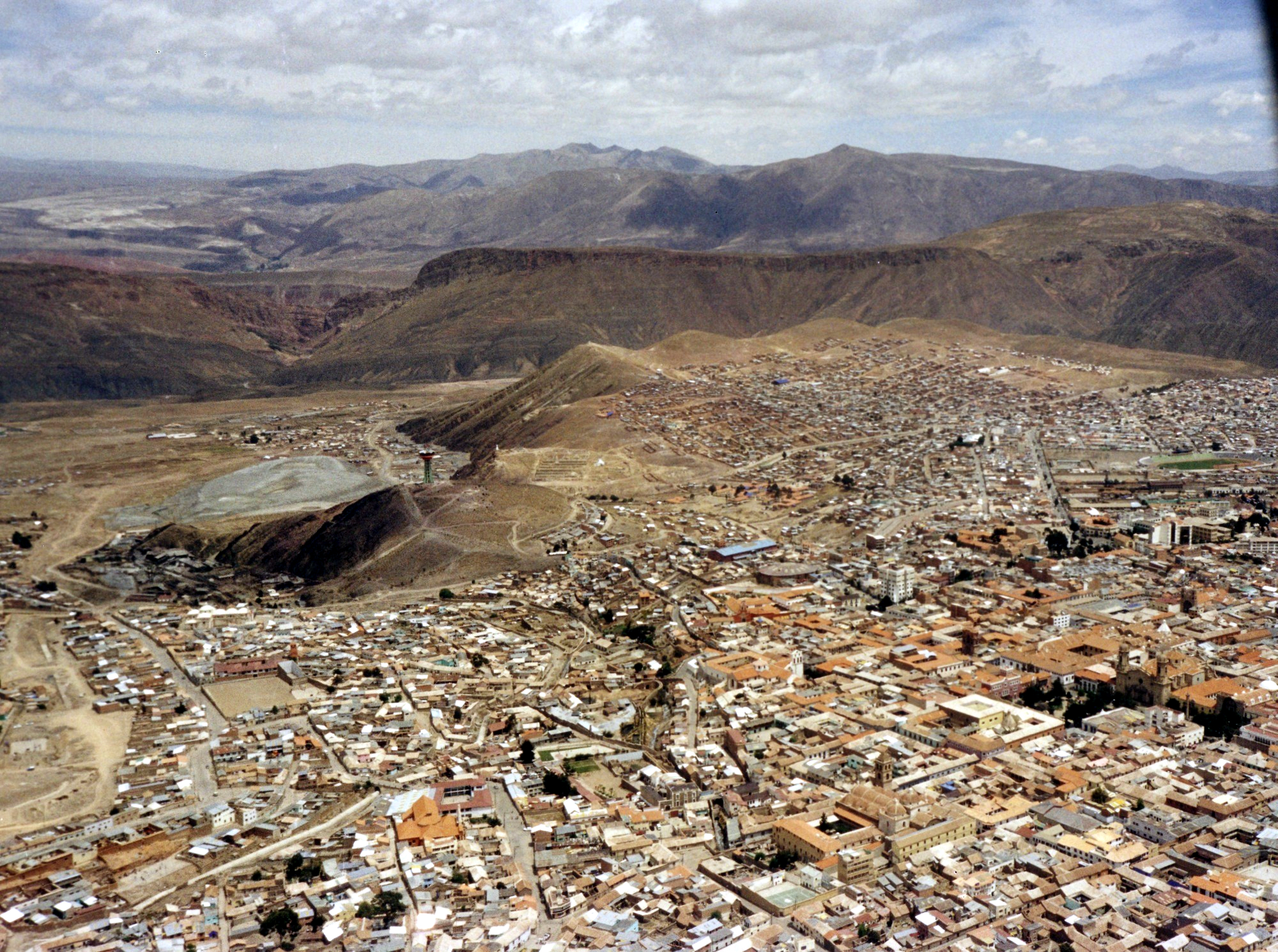
Potosí

Policies are set by the government; within the government the Vice-Ministry of Basic Sanitation in the Ministry of Environment and Water and is in charge of setting water policies. Another Vice-Ministry in the same ministry is in charge of water resources management and irrigation. Before 2006 these sectors were under different ministries, notably the Ministry of Housing and Basic Services and the Ministry of the Environment.

=== Provision of services ===
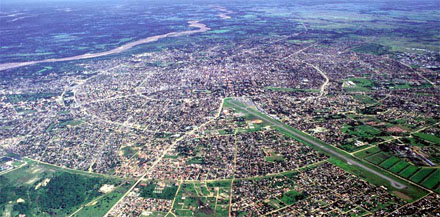
Santa Cruz de la Sierra

In urban areas, municipal governments (either directly or through decentralized companies) are in charge of service provision as well as the development of plans and programs for service expansion in areas under their jurisdiction, in coordination with departmental governments.

In some cities, cooperatives (utilities owned by their consumers) are in charge of water supply and sanitation service provision. SAGUAPAC in Santa Cruz is the largest consumer cooperative utility in the world. According to the World Bank, its performance indicators place it among the best water utilities in Latin America.

The country has 9 departments and 327 municipalities. It also has 14 water and sanitation providers, which are called Empresas Prestadores de Servicios de Agua Potable y Alcantarillado (EPSA) in the largest cities. In 1982, the EPSAs have formed the National Association of Water and Sewage Companies (ANESAPA).

In rural areas Juntas or Water Committees are in charge of operating and maintaining the systems. In more dispersed areas of the country it is often the households themselves who take the initiative to obtain access to water and sanitation services, an approach called self-supply of water and sanitation.

== Financial aspects ==
=== Investment ===
In the 1980s investment in the sector was below US$20 million per year. Starting in 1990, this average increased to approximately US$40 million. In 1999, when US$69.4 million were invested the annual investment reached its peak. After 2000 investments dropped back again (see table below)

=== Sources of financing ===
Between 1992 and 2000, 58% of investments were externally financed (mainly from the IDB, World Bank, Japanese JICA and the German KfW), 17% by municipal governments, 8% by the private sector and 17% by departmental governments.

=== Financing mechanisms ===
In 2004 the government of President Carlos Mesa defined a new Sectoral Financial Policy. The EPSA would receive credits and transfers for investments for participating in a Plan for Institutional Modernization (PMI) and establishing an Integral Development Plan (PID). Resources are assigned to each EPSA with priority to those with larger poverty levels and lower levels of coverage, according to a mathematic formula called Asignador Financiero Sectoral (AFS). The subsidies are higher and the conditions of loans less onerous to the EPSA with lower coverage and higher levels of poverty. The National Fund for Regional Development (FNDR) is the government's instrument for the targeting of loans destined for water and sanitation investments.

The Foundation for the Support to Sustainable Basic Sanitation (FUNDASAB) channels technical assistance to services to promote their sustainability.

== External support ==
=== Germany ===
- GTZ-supported project Drinking water supply and sanitation in small and medium-sized cities, see also GTZ.
- The development bank KfW provides funds for infrastructure improvements and institutional development of water utility companies.

=== Inter-American Development Bank ===
- BO0175 : Basic Sanitation for Small Municipalities: Approved on December 8, 1999, the US$40 million loan focuses on increasing quality and coverage of basic water and sanitation services in rural communities less than 1,000.

=== World Bank ===
- Bolivia Urban Infrastructure Project: Approved on November 21, 2006, the US$30 million loan is aimed at improving access to basic services to urban poor and is directed towards sewerage (43%) and flood protection (7%).

== In popular culture ==
The water supply issue in Bolivia was the main theme of the James Bond movie Quantum of Solace. The story was based on the Cochabamba Water Revolt.

== See also ==
- Pampalarama Dam
- Electricity sector in Bolivia
