= Cochabamba Water War =

1999–2000 Bolivian anti-privatization protests

- Demonstrators demand removal of consortium and end of privatization of water works
- Date: November 1999 – April 2000
- Location: Cochabamba, Bolivia
- Caused by: Privatization of Cochabamba's water system (SEMAPA) and water supply by Aguas del Tunari
- Methods: Demonstrations, referendum, road blockades, riots
- Result: Expulsion of Aguas del Tunari; Repeal of Law 2029

Parties
Coordinadora in Defense of Water and Life; MAS-IPSP; CONDEPA; MBL; MIR-NM; PCB	Government of Bolivia; Aguas del Tunari; Bolivian National Police Corps

Casualties
- Deaths: 6
- Injuries: 175
- Arrested: 20+

The Cochabamba Water War, also known as the Bolivian Water War, was a series of protests that took place in Cochabamba, Bolivia's fourth largest city, between December 1999 and April 2000 in response to the privatization of the city's municipal water supply company SEMAPA. The wave of demonstrations and police violence was described as a public uprising against water prices.

The tensions erupted when a new firm, Aguas del Tunari (a joint venture involving Bechtel), was required to invest in construction of a long-envisioned dam (a priority of mayor Manfred Reyes Villa), so they had drastically raised water rates. Protests, largely organized through the Coordinadora (Coalition in Defense of Water and Life), a community coalition, erupted in January, February, and April 2000, culminating in tens of thousands marching downtown and battling police. One civilian was killed. On 10 April 2000, the national government reached an agreement with the Coordinadora to reverse the privatization. A complaint filed by foreign investors was resolved by agreement in February 2001.

== Economic background of Bolivia ==
The restoration of civilian rule to Bolivia in 1982 ended decades of military dictatorships, but did not bring economic stability. In 1985, with hyperinflation at an annual rate of 25000%, few foreign investors would do business in the country. The Bolivian government turned to the World Bank as a last resort against economic meltdown. For the next 20 years, successive governments followed the World Bank's provisions in order to qualify for continued loans from the organization.

== World Bank ==
The World Bank said that "poor governments are often too plagued by local corruption", similarly the World Bank stated that "no subsidies should be given to ameliorate the increase in water tariffs in Cochabamba". The New Yorker reported on the World Bank's motives, "Most of the poorest neighborhoods were not hooked up to the network, so the state subsidies and water utility went mainly to industries and middle-class neighborhoods; the poor paid far more for water of dubious purity from trucks and handcarts. In the World Bank's view, it was a city that was crying out for water privatization."

In a 2002 publication the World Bank acknowledges that one of its loans, the "Major Cities Water and Sewerage Rehabilitation Project", included a condition to privatize the La Paz and Cochabamba water utilities. The privatization was required to allow a two-year extension of the project that was due to close in 1995. The World Bank project that began in 1990 had covered three cities, leading to sharply diverging outcomes: Access increased and service quality improved in Santa Cruz de la Sierra where a successful cooperative provided services, which enjoyed, according to the World Bank, "the reputation as one of the best-managed utilities in South America." However, results were mixed in La Paz and poor in Cochabamba. In the latter, access to piped water had actually decreased from 70% to 60%, water losses had remained high at 40% and water supply had remained unreliable at about four hours a day despite the funds made available by the World Bank to support the public utility. The World Bank did not include a conditionality to privatize water in Santa Cruz where the local utility had been able to improve services, but only in the cities where the utilities had failed to improve services.

The World Bank acknowledges that it provided assistance to prepare a concession contract for Cochabamba in 1997. However, its involvement with water in Cochabamba ended in the same year. At that time the bidding process for the concession had been declared void by the Supreme Court in response to a legal challenge by the municipality of Cochabamba. In the same year the World Bank project in the three cities ended. The World Bank thus was not included any more in the subsequent phase of the privatization.

The Misicuni dam project was later pursued by Evo Morales when he became President of Bolivia nine years later. It was justified through its benefits for hydropower generation and irrigation in addition to potable water supply for Cochabamba. Construction began on the dam in June 2009 and was completed in September 2017.

== Aguas del Tunari consortium ==
Prior to privatization the water works of Cochabamba were controlled by the state agency SEMAPA. After pressure from the World Bank, Bolivia put SEMAPA up for auction for privatization but not capitalization. Only one party was willing to bid on the project. This was Aguas del Tunari, a consortium between the British firm International Waters (55 percent) - itself a subsidiary of the construction giant Bechtel (USA) and United Utilities (UK) - the engineering and construction firm Abengoa of Spain (25 percent) and four Bolivian companies including Befesa/Edison, Constructora Petricevic, Sociedad Boliviana de Cemento (SOBOCE), Compania Boliviana de Ingenieria and ICE Agua y Energia S.A., all involved with the construction and engineering industry. The water network that they envisioned was projected to provide drinking water to all the people of Cochabamba. This was set to double the existing coverage area and also introduce electrical production to more of the region.

Without regard for its weak bargaining position, the Bolivian government under President Hugo Banzer agreed to the terms of its sole bidder Aguas del Tunari and signed a $2.5 billion, 40-year concession "to provide water and sanitation services to the residents of Cochabamba, as well as generate electricity and irrigation for agriculture." Within the terms of the contract the consortium was guaranteed a minimum 15% annual return on its investment, which was to be annually adjusted to the United States' consumer price index. The implementation of Aguas del Tunari's program was set to correlate with a government plan to present a $63 million rural development package to peasants with funds for crop diversification, and extending electric and telephone services to remote areas.

== Law 2029 ==
To ensure the legality of the privatization the Bolivian government passed law 2029, which verified the contract with Aguas del Tunari. To many people, the law appeared to give a monopoly to Aguas del Tunari over all water resources. Many feared that this included water used for irrigation by peasant farmers (campesinos), and community-based resources that had previously been independent of regulation. The law was seen as "enabling the sale of water resources that had never really been a part of SEMAPA in the first place." Many became worried that independent communal water systems which had yet to be connected with SEMAPA would be "summarily appropriated by the new concession." By Law 2029, if Aguas del Tunari had wanted to, not only could it have installed meters and begin charging independently built communal water systems, but it could have also charged residents for the installation of those meters. The broad nature of Law 2029 led many to claim that the government would require a license be obtained for people to collect rainwater from their roofs. The first to raise concerns over the scope of the law was the new Federación Departamental Cochabambina de Regantes (FEDECOR) and its leader Omar Fernandez. FEDECOR was made up of local professionals, including engineers and environmentalists. They were joined by a federation of peasant farmers who relied on irrigation, and a confederation of factory workers' unions led by Oscar Olivera. Together these groups formed Coördinator for the Defense of Water and Life, or La Coordinadora which became the core of the opposition to the policy.

Law 2029 was one of the primary points of disagreement between protestors and the government. The initial intent of the law was to introduce concessions and licenses for the supply of potable water for cities with more than 10,000 inhabitants. For many Bolivians, the implementation of law 2029 and the concessions that accompanied it symbolized all the issues of the neoliberal development strategy—its obvious lack of concern for equity, its rejection of the role of the state, and in a country with a very long tradition of anti-imperialist rhetoric, the law represented a preferential attitude to foreign capital over the national interest. This opposition expressed by the community arose from across the political spectrum. The traditional left claimed that the transfer of state property to private enterprises was unconstitutional while the right opposed the denationalization of enterprises that it considered vital and strategic.

== Rate hike ==
As a condition of the contract Aguas del Tunari had agreed to pay the $30 million in debt accumulated by SEMAPA. They also agreed to finance an expansion of the water system, and began a much needed maintenance program on the existing deteriorating water system. Dider Quint, a managing director for the consortium, said "We were confident that we could implement this program in a shorter period than the one required by the contract. [To accomplish this] We had to reflect in the tariff increase all the increases that had never been implemented before."

On top of this, in order to secure the contract, Aguas del Tunari had to promise the Bolivian government to fund the completion of the stalled Misicuni dam project. The dam was purportedly designed to pipe water through the mountains, but the World Bank had deemed it uneconomic. While the consortium had no interest in building the dam, it was a condition of their contract, as it was backed by an influential member of Banzer's mega-coalition, the mayor of Cochabamba, Manfred Reyes Villa. An attempt to privatize the water system had been made without the condition of building the dam in 1997, but Reyes Villa had used his influence to quash the deal. Critics of Reyes Villa held that the dam was a "vanity project" which would profit "some of his main financial backers".

The officials in Bolivia for Aguas del Tunari were mostly engineers lacking marketing training. They were also foreigners unaware of the intricacies of Bolivian society and economics. Upon taking control, the company raised water rates an average of 35% to about $20 a month. While this seemed minuscule in the developed nations that the Aguas del Tunari staff had come from, many of their new customers only earned about $100 a month and $20 was more than they spent on food. In complete ignorance of the reality of his situation, a manager for the consortium, Geoffrey Thorpe simply said "if people didn't pay their water bills their water would be turned off." The poor were joined in their protest by January 2000, when middle-class homeowners and large business owners stripped of their subsidies saw their own water bills increase. As anger over the rates mounted, Reyes Villa was quick to distance himself from Aguas del Tunari.

== Protests and state of emergency ==
Starting in early January 2000 massive protests in Cochabamba began with Oscar Olivera among the most outspoken leaders against the rate hikes and subsequent water cut-offs. The demonstrators consisted of regantes (peasant irrigators) who entered the city either under village banners, or carrying the wiphala; they were joined by jubilados (retired unionized factory workers) under the direction of Olivera, and by Bolivian citizens. Young men began to try to take over the plaza and a barricade across incoming roadways was set up. Soon they were joined by pieceworkers, sweatshop employees, and street vendors (a large segment of the economy since the closure of the state-owned tin mines). Anarchists from the middle-classes came from the University of Cochabamba to denounce the World Bank and International Monetary Fund and neoliberalism. The strongest supporters of the demonstration were drawn from the city's growing population of homeless street children.

Protesters halted Cochabamba's economy by holding a general strike that shut down the city for four days. A ministerial delegation went to Cochabamba and agreed to roll back the water rates; still the demonstration continued. On 4 February 2000, thousands marching in protest were met by troops and law enforcement from Oruro and La Paz. Two days of clashes occurred with the police using tear gas. Almost 200 demonstrators were arrested; 70 protesters and 51 policemen were injured.

Throughout March 2000 the Bolivian hierarchy of the Roman Catholic Church tried to mediate between the government and the demonstrators. In the meantime, the Coordinadora made their own referendum and declared that out of fifty thousand votes, 96% demanded the contract with Aguas del Tunari be cancelled. The government's reply was that "There is nothing to negotiate."

In April 2000, demonstrators again took over Cochabamba's central plaza. When the leaders of the Coordinadora (including Óscar Olivera) went to a meeting with the governor at his office they were arrested. Though they were released the following day, some, fearing further government action, fled into hiding. More demonstration leaders were arrested, with some being transferred to a jungle prison in San Joaquin, a remote town in the Amazon rainforest on the border with Brazil. The demonstrations spread quickly to other areas including La Paz, Oruro, and Potosí as well as rural areas. The protesters also expanded their demands calling on the government to resolve unemployment and other economic problems. Soon demonstrators had most of the major highways in Bolivia barricaded. The protest even inspired officers in four La Paz police units to refuse to leave their barracks or obey superiors until a wage dispute was settled.

=== State of emergency ===
The Bolivian Constitution allows the President (with the support of his Cabinet) to declare a 90-day state of siege in one or more districts of the nation as an emergency measure to maintain public order in "cases of serious danger resulting from an internal civil disturbance". Any extension beyond 90 days must be approved of by the Congress. Anyone arrested at this time must be released after 90 days unless criminal charges are brought against them before a court. With the roads cut off and fearing a repeat of past uprisings, President Banzer on 8 April 2000 declared a "state of siege". Banzer said, "We see it as our obligation, in the common best interest, to decree a state of emergency to protect law and order." Information Minister Ronald MacLean Abaroa described the rationale for the decree, saying "We find ourselves with a country with access roads to the cities blocked, with food shortages, passengers stranded and chaos beginning to take hold in other cities." The decree suspended "some constitutional guarantees, allowing police to detain protest leaders without a warrant, restrict travel and political activity and establish a curfew." Meetings of over four people were outlawed, and the freedom of the press was curtailed with radio stations being taken over by the military and some newspaper reporters being arrested. The police moved in to enforce the policy with nighttime raids and mass arrests. At one point 20 labor union and civic leaders were arrested. The police's tear gas and rubber bullets were met by the protesters' rocks and Molotov cocktails. Continuing violent clashes between the demonstrators and law enforcement led to internal exile, 40 injuries, and five deaths. International Human Rights Organizations decried the "state of siege" declaration. This was the seventh time since Bolivia returned to democracy in 1982 that the "state of siege" decree had been employed.

On April 9, 2000, near the city of Achacachi, soldiers met resistance to removing a roadblock and opened fire, killing two people (including a teenage boy) and wounding several others. Angry residents overpowered soldiers and used their weapons against military leaders. They wounded Battalion commander Armando Carrasco Nava and army captain Omar Jesus Tellez Arancibia. The demonstrators then found Tellez in hospital, dragged him from his bed, beat him to death and dismembered his body.

Also, on April 9, 2000, 800 striking police officers fired tear gas at soldiers (to which the soldiers then fired their weapons in the air). In response the government gave a 50% pay raise to the La Paz police to end the strike. This brought their monthly income up from the equivalent of $80 to $120. The police then returned to enforcement procedures against those still demonstrating. A group of soldiers soon demanded their own raise, declaring that there was racial discrimination in the pay scale. Police in Santa Cruz, the nation's second largest city, also went on strike demanding a raise.

== Government view of the demonstrators ==
The coca growers of Bolivia led by then-Congressman Evo Morales (later elected President of Bolivia in December 2005) had joined the demonstrators and were demanding an end to the United States-sponsored program of coca eradication of their crops (while coca leaf can be heavily refined and made into cocaine it is used legally by many in Bolivia for teas and for chewing). Seeing the involvement of the coca growers, the Bolivian government claimed that the demonstrators were actually agents or pawns of drug traffickers. Ronald MacLean Abaroa, the Minister of Information, told reporters the demonstrations were the work of drug traffickers trying to stop the government program to eradicate coca fields and replace them with cotton, pineapples, and bananas. He said that "These protests [were] a conspiracy financed by cocaine trafficking looking for pretexts to carry out subversive activities. It is impossible for so many farmers to spontaneously move on their own." MacLean said President Hugo Banzer was worried because "political groups and traffickers are instigating farmers to confront the army." Felix Santos, a leader of the farmers rejected such claims, saying "We are protesting because of higher gasoline and transportation prices and a law that will charge us for the use of water."

== Protesters' demands expand ==
Teachers of state schools in rural areas went on strike calling for salary increases (at the time they made $1,000 a year). In the capital city of La Paz students began to fight with police. Demonstrators put up roadblocks of stones, bricks and barrels near Achacachi and Batallas, and violence broke out there as well (one army officer and two farmers were killed and dozens injured). Soldiers and police soon cleared most of the roadblocks that had cut off highways in five of the country's nine provinces.

== Resolution ==
After a televised recording of a Bolivian Army captain, Robinson Iriarte de la Fuente, firing a rifle into a crowd of demonstrators, wounding many and hitting high school student Víctor Hugo Daza in the face, killing him, intense anger erupted. The police told the executives of the consortium that their safety could no longer be guaranteed. The executives then fled from Cochabamba to Santa Cruz. After coming out of four days of hiding, Oscar Olivera signed a concord with the government guarantee the removal of Aguas del Tunari and turning Cochabamba's water works over to La Coordinadora. Detained demonstrators were to be released and Law 2029 repealed. The Banzer government then told Aguas del Tunari that by leaving Cochabamba they had "abandoned" the concession and declared the $200 million contract revoked. The company, insisting that it had not left voluntarily but been forced out, filed a $40 million lawsuit in the International Centre for Settlement of Investment Disputes, an appellate body of the World Bank, against the Bolivian government, "claiming compensation for lost profits under a bilateral investment treaty." On the day following Víctor Hugo Daza's funeral, Óscar Olivera climbed to his union office's balcony and proclaimed victory to the exhausted crowd. The demonstrators declared that they would not relent until Law 2029 was changed. To get a quorum to amend the law the government even rented planes to fly legislators back to the capital. In a special session on 11 April 2000 the law was changed.

== Aftermath ==
=== World Bank and continuing protests ===
On 12 April 2000 when asked about outcome in Bolivia, World Bank President James Wolfensohn maintained that free or subsidized delivery of a public service like water leads to abuse of the resource; he said, "The biggest problem with water is the waste of water through lack of charging."

In Washington, D.C., on the 16 April 2000 IMF and World Bank meetings, protesters attempted to blockade the streets to stop the meeting. They cited the Water Wars in Bolivia as an example of corporate greed and a reason to resist globalization. Oscar Olivera attended the protests, saying, "The people have recaptured their dignity, their capacity to organize themselves - and most important of all, the people are no longer scared."

On 23 April 2002 Oscar Olivera led 125 protesters to the San Francisco headquarters of Bechtel, the only member of Aguas del Tunari located in the Americas. Olivera said "With the $25 million they are seeking, 125,000 people could have access to water." Bechtel officials agreed to meet him.

The victory gained the cocalero and campesino groups international support from anti-globalisation groups. Oscar Olivera and Omar Fernandez have become sought after speakers at venues discussing how to resist resource privatization and venues critical of the World Bank. Congressman Evo Morales's actions in the Water Wars raised his profile, and he was elected President of Bolivia in 2005. Omar Fernandez joined Morales' Movement for Socialism and became a Bolivian senator.

The Cochabamba protests of 2000 are chronicled by Olivera in his book Cochabamba! Water Rebellion in Bolivia.

=== Legal settlement ===
On 19 January 2006, a settlement was reached between the Government of Bolivia (then under the Presidency of Eduardo Rodriguez Veltze) and Aguas del Tunari, it was agreed (according to the Bechtel press release) that "the concession was terminated only because of the civil unrest and the state of emergency in Cochabamba and not because of any act done or not done by the international shareholders of Aguas del Tunari". With this statement the shareholders withdrew any financial claims against Bolivia.

=== Iriarte case ===
When no sitting judge would hear the case against Captain Robinson Iriarte, it was transferred to a military tribunal (that had final jurisdiction over which cases it hears). In March 2002, Captain Iriarte was acquitted by the tribunal of any responsibility for the death of Víctor Hugo Daza. After Iriarte's acquittal, he was promoted to the rank of major.

=== Continued lack of water in Cochabamba ===
In the end, water prices in Cochabamba returned to their pre-2000 levels with a group of community leaders running the restored state utility company SEMAPA. As late as 2005, half of the 600,000 people of Cochabamba remained without water and those with it only received intermittent service (some as little as three hours a day). Oscar Olivera the leading figure in the protests admitted, "I would have to say we were not ready to build new alternatives." SEMAPA managers say they are still forced to deal with graft and inefficiencies, but that its biggest problem is a lack of money (it can not raise rates, and after Aguas del Tunari was forced out, other international companies are unwilling to give them more loans). Luis Camargo, SEMAPA's operations manager in an interview with The New York Times said they were forced to continue using a water-filtration system that is split between "an obsolete series of 80-year-old tanks and a 29-year-old section that uses gravity to move mountain water from one tank to another." He stated that the system was built for a far smaller city and worried about shrinking aquifers. A system to bring water down from the mountains would cost $300 million and SEMAPA's budget is only about $5 million a year.

The New Yorker reports "in Cochabamba, those who are not on the network and who have no well, pay ten times as much for their water as the relatively wealthy residents who are hooked up", and with no new capital the situation can not be improved. A local resident complained that water-truck operators "drill polluted water and sell it. They [also] waste a lot of water." According to author Frederik Segerfeldt, "the poor of Cochabamba are still paying 10 times as much for their water as the rich, connected households and continue to indirectly subsidize water consumption of more well-to-do sectors of the community. Water nowadays is available only four hours a day and no new households have been connected to the supply network." Franz Taquichiri, a veteran of the Water War and an SEMAPA director elected by the community, said "I don't think you'll find people in Cochabamba who will say they're happy with service. No one will be happy unless they get service 24 hours a day." Another Cochabamba resident and activist during the unrest summed up her opinion of the situation by saying, "afterwards, what had we gained? We were still hungry and poor."

== Aguas de Illimani ==
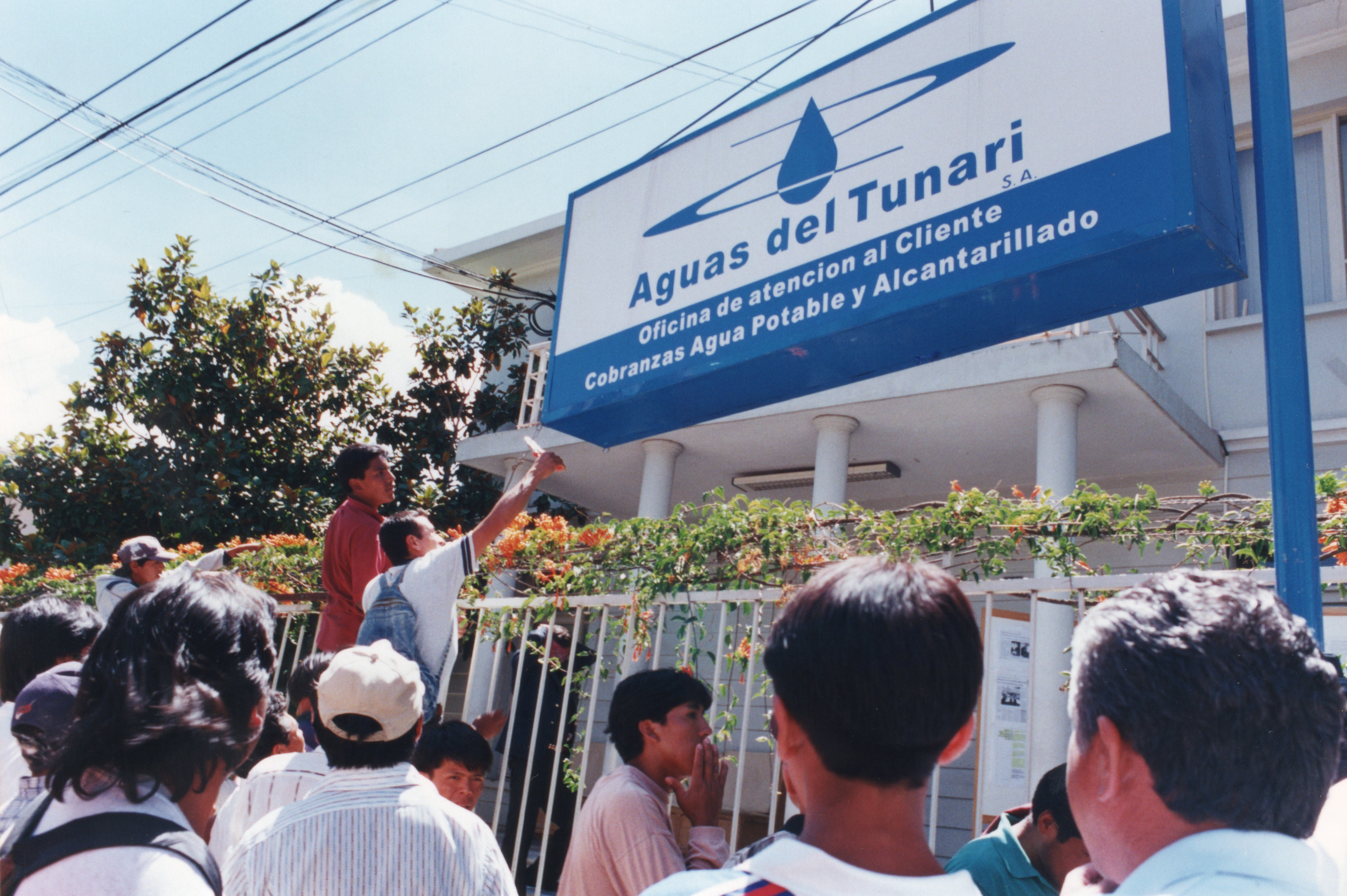
Aguas del Illimani subsidiary was seized by protestors during the war of the water.

Similar protests took place in La Paz over Aguas de Illimani, a subsidiary of the French multinational Suez. Aguas de Illimani's contract with the state was broken after allegations were made by the Bolivian government that it did not respect all the clauses of the contract. According to the Bolivian ambassador Pablo Solón Romero, the International Finance Corporation (IFC), part of the World Bank Group, was a share-holder of Aguas de Illimani. The ambassador pointed out that since the case was brought before the ICSID, which is an arm of the World Bank, a conflict of interest arose in this affair.

== In popular culture ==
- Even the Rain (Spanish: También la lluvia) is a 2010 Spanish drama film directed by Icíar Bollaín about filmmaker Sebastian (Gael García Bernal) who travels to Bolivia to shoot a film about the Spanish conquest of America. He and his crew arrive in 2000 during the tense time of the Cochabamba water crisis.
- The Cochabamba protests were featured in the 2003 documentary film The Corporation.
- The plot of the 2008 James Bond film Quantum of Solace is heavily based on the Cochabamba Water War.

== See also ==
- ICSID (International Centre for Settlement of Investment Disputes)
- Bolivian Gas War
- Bolivian presidential election, 2005
- Water supply and sanitation in Bolivia
