= Water privatization in Bolivia =

The privatization of water supply and sanitation in Bolivia took place during the second mandate of Bolivian President Hugo Banzer (1997–2001) in the form of two major private concessions: one in La Paz/El Alto to Aguas del Illimani S.A. (AISA), a subsidiary of the French Suez (formerly Lyonnaise des Eaux) in 1997; and a second one in Cochabamba to Aguas del Tunari, a subsidiary of the multinationals Biwater and Bechtel in 1999.

== Background ==
The World Bank and the International Development Bank highlighted water privatization as a requirement for the Bolivian government in order to retain ongoing state loans. Bechtel Corporation of the United States offered a deal with the Bolivian government in order to privatize water and profit. Renouncing the deal was seen as unthinkable to the leaders who felt pressure to keep the trust of international investors, as the economic crisis in Argentina was partly caused by a loss of credibility with international bankers.

Many of the poorest neighborhoods were not connected to the network of water systems, and paid even more for lower quality water from trucks and handcarts. Cooperative wells were built before the privatization could be expanded on and taken over by the Bechtel subsidiary at the expense of those who used the well and who had already paid for the existing structure.

== Cochabamba Water War ==
In early 2000, protests against the raised price of water due to privatization had been growing, and martial law was declared. In April 2000, Víctor Hugo Daza, a seventeen-year-old student, was shot in the face by the Bolivian Army while protesting the increase of local water rates due to privatization. The man who killed him, Captain Robinson Iriarte, was trained as a counter-insurgent in the United States; he was acquitted of all responsibility for the murder in 2002. No civilian criminal justice system would take the case on, so a military tribunal had final jurisdiction. Upon his acquittal, he was promoted to major.

Thousands of people captured the central plaza in Cochabamba and surrounded the fountain where Daza's body lay. Protestors comprised peasant irrigators, retired factory workers, union members, pieceworkers, sweatshop employees, street vendors, students from the University of Cochabamba, coca-leaf farmers and residential children.

== Misicuni Dam ==
International Water has agreed to complete the Misicuni Dam. The dam will pipe water through the mountains and create hydroelectric water. When flooded, it will displace 1365 people and flood the Tunari National Park.

== Impact ==
It is argued that the privatization process did little to address water access and that the increase in water prices following such measures was met by an approximate 2% increase in levels of poverty.

Following two popular uprisings against water privatization, the first in Cochabamba in April 2000 and the second in La Paz/El Alto in January 2005, the two concessions were terminated. In the latter case, Aguas de Illimani was replaced by the public utility Empresa Pública Social de Agua y Saneamiento (EPSAS).

The public water utility came under some criticism in 2008 due to water shortages, accounting errors, tariff increases and poor disaster preparedness. Consequently, representatives of the La Paz neighborhood association announced their intention to create their own service provider.

== See also ==
- Óscar Olivera, leader in the anti-water privatization movement of Bolivia
- Water supply and sanitation in Bolivia
- Water privatization
- Quantum of Solace, which featured water privatization in Bolivia as a plot point
