= Oscar Olivera =

Bolivian activist (born 1955)

- Born: 1955 (age 70–71); Bolivia
- Organization: La Coordinadora
- Awards: Goldman Environmental Prize (2001)

Oscar Olivera Foronda (born 1955) is a Bolivian union leader who was one of the main leaders of the protesters against the water privatization in Bolivia. The result of these protests was an event known as the Cochabamba Water War. He was also one of the main leaders of the protests in the Bolivian gas conflict. He is also the head of a confederation of factory workers' unions.

Oscar Olivera was awarded the Goldman Environmental Prize in 2001.

== In popular culture ==
Oscar Olivera's role in the Cochabamba Water War is featured in the 2008 documentary film Blue Gold: World Water Wars.
