= Electricity sector in Bolivia =

Electricity sector of Bolivia
Data
- Electricity coverage (2003): 67% (total), 28% (rural); (LAC total average in 2007: 92%)
- Installed capacity (2006): 1.43 GW
- Share of fossil energy: 60%
- Share of renewable energy: 40% (hydro)
- GHG emissions from electricity generation (1994): 0.19 t CO_{2}e per capita
- Average electricity use (2006): 588 kWh per capita
- Distribution losses (2005): 10%; (LAC average in 2005: 13.6%)

Consumption by sector (% of total)
- Residential: 40%
- Industrial: 28%

Tariffs and financing
- Average residential tariff (US$/kW·h, 2006): 0.0614; (LAC average in 2005: 0.115)
- Average industrial tariff (US$/kW·h, 2006): 0.0404 (LAC average in 2005: 0.107)
- Annual investment in electricity: US$40 million
- Share of government financing (2004): 50%

Services
- Sector unbundling: Yes
- Share of private sector in generation: 100% (in the SIN-National Interconnected System)
- Share of private sector in distribution: 100% (in the SIN)
- Competitive supply to large users: No (regional distribution monopolies)
- Competitive supply to residential users: No

Institutions
- No. of service providers: 3 (generation), 3 (distribution)
- Responsibility for transmission: 2 (Transportadora de Electricidad, ISA Bolivia)
- Responsibility for regulation: Multi-sector national regulator
- Responsibility for policy-setting: Viceministry of Electricity and Alternative Energy
- Responsibility for the environment: Land Planning and Environment Vice-Ministry
- Electricity sector law: Yes (1994)
- Renewable energy law: No
- CDM transactions related to the electricity sector: 1 registered CDM project; 141,691 t CO_{2}e annual emissions reductions

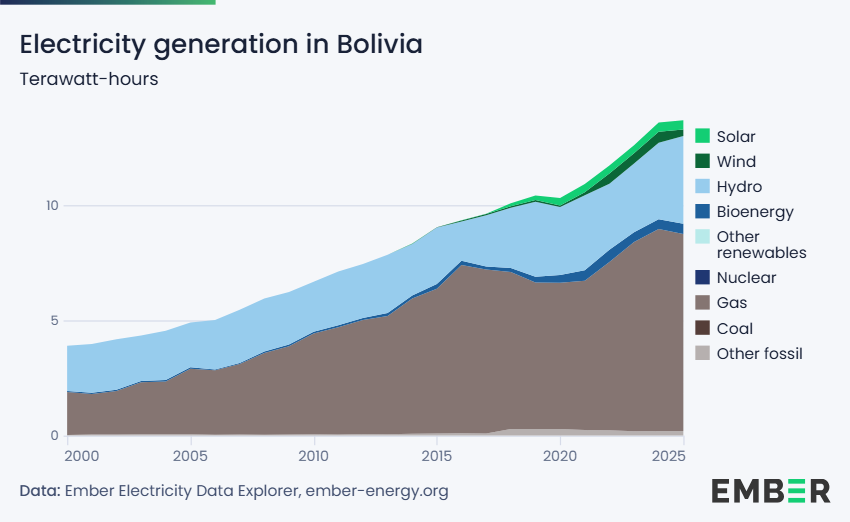
Electricity generation in Bolivia in terawatt-hours

The electricity sector in Bolivia is dominated by the state-owned ENDE Corporation (Empresa Nacional de Electricidad), although the private Bolivian Power Company (Compañia Boliviana de Energía Eléctrica; COBEE) is also a major producer of electricity. ENDE had been unbundled into generation, transmission and distribution and privatized in the 1990s, but most of the sector was re-nationalized in 2010 (generation) and 2012 (transmission and distribution).

The supply is dominated by thermal generation (65%), while hydropower (35%) has a smaller share in its generation mix compared to other South American countries. (Latin America and the Caribbean, or LAC, average hydropower capacity is 51%.) In 2014, national electricity supply of 1580.35 MW comfortably exceeded the 1298.2 MW maximum demand. Like in other countries, Bolivia's electricity sector consists of a National Interconnected System (SIN) and off-grid systems (known as the Aislado).

The national government's priorities for the electricity sector include providing universal access to electricity and producing surplus energy for export. The electricity coverage in rural areas is among the lowest in Latin America and improving it represents a major challenge in the future. The government envisions a major expansion of electricity generation capacity to over 8,000 MW over the decade from 2015 to 2025, primarily to export surplus generating capacity.

== Electricity supply and demand ==
=== Installed capacity ===
In Bolivia, the National Interconnected System (SIN) connects major population centers and represents 83% of the installed capacity. The SIN provides electricity to the largest cities and operates in the Departments of Cochabamba, Santa Cruz, Oruro, Potosí and Chuquisaca. Its grid extends over 1,200 miles and covers the central and southern parts of the country. The population in the northern and western parts of the country remains largely unconnected to the national grid, either served by the off-grid system (the Aislado) or having no access to electricity at all. The off-grid system consists of numerous self producers and independent power plants in rural or isolated areas.

Total installed capacity in 2006 was 1.43 GW, of which 60% was thermal production, which primarily burns natural gas, and 40% hydroelectric. The contribution of other renewables is almost negligible. Total electricity production in the same year amounted to 5.29 TWh. This figure does not include electricity produced in rural areas from biomass facilities, which are unorganized, decentralized, and difficult to quantify.

Bolivia's electricity export and import activities are fairly limited. Imports from Brazil amount to less than 0.01 TWh per year and have so far been devoted to supply the city of Puerto Suarez, in the Department of Santa Cruz.

=== Demand ===
Electric power consumption per capita in 2006 was 588 kWh (a 19% increase since 1996). By sector, residential consumption represents 40% of the total, followed by industrial consumption with 28%.

=== Demand and supply projection ===
According to the demand projections prepared by the Superintendencia de Electricidad (SE), the generation capacity reserve will be insufficient by 2009 as it will fall below the recommended 10% if no new capacity is developed.

== Access to electricity ==
In 2005, total access to electricity in Bolivia was 67%, one of the lowest in Latin America. Urban access was 87%, while rural access remained as low as 30%.

(See Recent Developments for more information on electrification plans)

=== Interruption frequency and duration ===
Service quality as measured by interruptions was much better than the LAC average in 2005. In the period November 2004 – October 2005 there were a total of 141 transmission interruptions (up from 86 in the previous period), with a total duration of 4,274 minutes. 57% of the interruptions were due to weather conditions and, while 17% derived from facility operations. In 2005, the average duration of interruptions per subscriber was 5 hours (highest since 1998 although far below the 14 hours average for LAC), while the average number of interruptions per subscriber per year was 7 (highest since 1995 but also below the 13 average for LAC).

=== Distribution and transmission losses ===
During the 1990s and up to 2005, distribution losses have always been close to 10%, which is below the 13.6% average for the region.

== Responsibilities in the electricity sector ==
=== Policy and regulation ===
The Viceministry of Electricity and Alternative Energy, within the Ministry of Petroleum and Energy, is in charge of establishing policies and designing the regulation for the electricity sector. The Superintendencia de Electricidad (SE) is responsible for applying the regulation.

The companies that belong to the National Interconnected System (SIN) must be vertically unbundled. However, the companies in the off-grid system (the Aislado) are allowed to perform more than one of the activities defined in the electricity industry (i.e. generation, transmission, distribution).

=== Generation ===
Currently, there are eight generation companies in the interconnected system, all of them privately owned. The three largest companies alone represent 70% of the total generation. The largest company serving the SIN is the Compañia Boliviana de Energía Eléctrica (COBEE), which serves the region surrounding La Paz. The other two are Empresa Eléctrica Guarachi (EGSA) and Empresa Eléctrica Corani (CORANI).

=== Transmission ===
Currently, there are three transmission companies which operate the high-voltage Interconnecting Trunk System (STI), the backbone of the SIN. ENDE Corporation, ISA Bolivia, which was created in 2005, and San Cristobal TESA. The state-owned ENDE incorporates Transportadora de Electricidad (TDE), which was owned by Spain's Red Electrica de España (REE). As of 2013, its transmission network extended 2,850 km, representing 79% of the national total. ISA Bolivia, which runs 587 km, or 16%, of the transmission network in Bolivia, is a subsidiary of Interconexión Eléctrica S.A. (ISA), a corporation controlled by the government of Colombia. San Cristobal TESA has 172 km of transmission lines, or 5%. The number of companies is limited due to the existence of institutional entry barriers in this sector.

=== Distribution ===
In Bolivia, the six existing distribution companies enjoy a geographic monopoly in their concession areas. The largest company is Electropaz, majority-owned by Spain's Iberdrola; followed by Empresa de Luz y Fuerza Eléctrica Cochabamba (ELFEC), which was owned by the American PPL Global until 2007. The third place is occupied by the Rural Electrification Cooperative (CRE), which operates in the Department of Santa Cruz.

In some cases, especially in the high plateau, cooperatives and community organizations access the distribution companies’ network and sell electricity to small rural communities. Sometimes, those are organized enterprises that provide the service to middle-size towns, but in most cases, they are small organizations that serve family communities. This situation faces a legal vacuum since the consumers benefiting from these scheme, who do not consume the minimum power established legally established, cannot be considered as regulated ones. In addition, these consumers are localized outside the distribution companies’ concession areas, so they cannot receive the companies’ service. In practice, the distribution companies are reselling electricity to the mentioned organizations outside the legal framework. Accurate information on the number of organizations that operate in rural areas does not exist. However, there are approximately three in La Paz, twenty in Oruro and three in Potosi.

=== Operators in the off-grid system ===
The departments of Beni, Pando and Tarija and the eastern region of Santa Cruz are not integrated in the SIN. As a result, there are vertically integrated operators that provide the service. The most important operators are:

- SETAR (Servicios Eléctricos Tarija, S.A.): 44 MW, serves 56,885 clients
- ENDE (Empresa Nacional de Electricidad): 16.65 MW, serves 28,554 clients
- CRE (Cooperativa Regional de Electricidad): 14.53 MW, serves 4,940 clients

== Renewable energy resources ==
Renewable energy resources other than hydropower are barely exploited in Bolivia, and their contribution to electricity generation is insignificant. However, the potential of decentralized electricity systems (i.e. solar photovoltaics or PV, wind, etc.) for disperse populations was recognized by the government in the Rural Electrification Plan (PLABER). This component established that the service to households, schools and health facilities in areas of low population density would rely on locally available renewable energy sources.

=== Hydropower ===
Bolivia has a considerable hydro potential, its technically feasible potential being assessed at 126 TWh/yr, of which 50 TWh/yr is considered to be economically exploitable. Only a small proportion of the total potential has been harnessed so far. The share of hydropower capacity in Bolivia is 40%, which is below the 51% average for the region. Installed hydroelectric capacity in 2016 was 494 MW, distributed amongst some 21 facilities. The largest plant is the 93 MW Saint Isabel, operated by Corani. Bolivia is working with Brazil on a huge joint project to exploit the hydro-electric potential of the Rio Madeira complex in the Amazon region. Within this project are the 800 MW Cachuela Esperanza plant sited entirely in Bolivia and the Guajara-Mirim plant (3000 MW) to be located on the border between the two countries.

=== Solar ===
The World Bank is financing a rural infrastructure project in Bolivia which, among others, plans to install 17,000 solar home systems by 2009. Another project funded by the Global Partnership on Out-based Aid which is administered by the World Bank intends to scale up the installations by an additional 7000 in the next three years. (see External Assistance below)

In the mid-2010s, ENDE began building and operating large-scale solar power plants including the following:

- A 5.1 MW solar photovoltaic plant in Cobija, Pando, providing power to Cobija, Porvenir, Filadelfia, Bella Flor, Puerto Rico, and Chivé. The project was funded 47% by ENDE and 53% by the Danish official aid agency.
- The Yunchará solar photovoltaic plant in Yunchará, Tarija, which opened as a 5 MW plant in July 2017. A second phase would produce an additional 50 MW.
- The Uyuni solar photovoltaic plant in Uyuni, Potosí, scheduled to open as a 50 MW plant in March 2017.

== History of the electricity sector ==
=== Early history ===
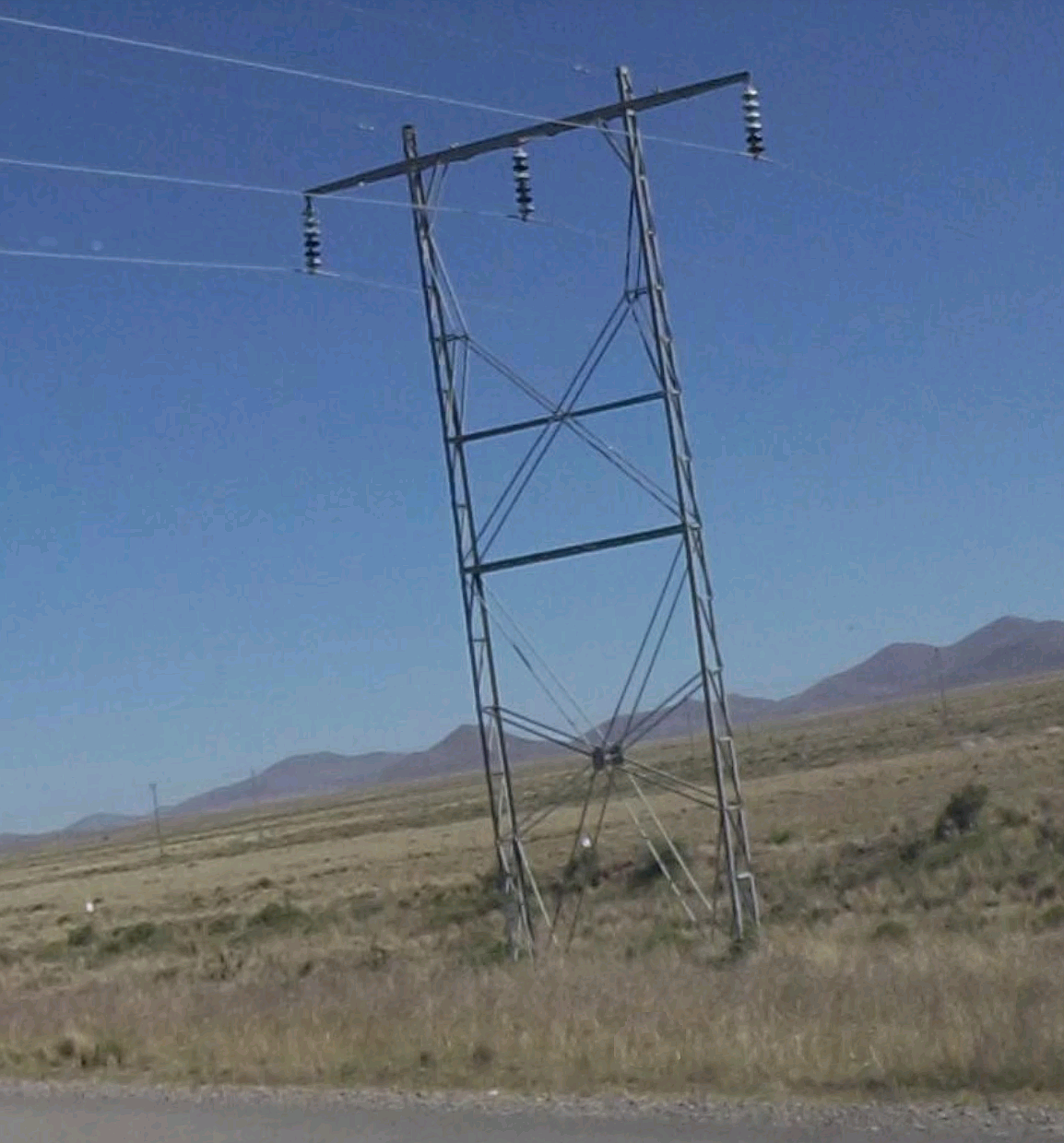
Old 69 kV transmission power line, which connects the Miguillas hydroelectric station with Oruro and the mining industry in Llallagua.

Electricity in Bolivia started in 1899, when tin magnate Simón Iturri Patiño built a Diesel-generated power plant in Uncía, which provided energy to his nearby residence and the Miraflores mine. The first hydroelectric power plant was built in 1902 in Landara. Soon after more hydroelectric plants were built around the urban centers of Potosí, La Paz and Cochabamba. One of the first overhead power lines run around 50 km between the Incachaca power station and Cochabamba. The hydroelectric station and power line were built in 1914 by a german company and served both urban electrification and the traction of the Cochabamba - Vinto - Arani railway. The ruins of the Incachaca power station are a tourist destination today.

Increasing need for electricity in the mining sector led to the construction of larger hydroelectric power stations, primarily in the western areas of the country. In the first half of the 20th century, mining companies erected first regional power grids (Foto). Because many of the larger mines were in arid regions, long distances of power transmission from the hydroelectric plants needed to be covered. Several hydroelectric schemes were developed from the 1930s. Private-owned power stations at the Rivers Miguillas and Khatu (Miguillas 1931, Angostura 1936, Huaña Cota) were connected to Oruro, Huanuni and Llallagua by a 69 kV line, with minor lines connecting Uncía, Catavi and Colquiri.

Another set of power stations was built at the Yura River (Landara 1902, Kilpani 1936, Punutuma 1963). Two 69 kV power lines connected these hydroelectric stations with Agua de Castilla, Tasna Rosario and Telamayu, with minor lines branching to Potosí, Tatasi and even Pulacayo, where large mining complexes existed. The Yura river is dubbed as "Rio Eléctrico" (Electric river) because its importance for electric generation. Since 1938, the Zongo River is used for the supply of La Paz. During that time, Bolivia had one of the longest power transmission grids in South America with a length of several hundred kilometers, though it is unknown if these power schemes were connected before creation of the national grid in 1965.

Electrification supplied larger cities and the mining sector, while rural area were mostly neglected. Electrification furthermore covered mainly the western parts of the country until 1941/1942, when the agricultural and hydrocarbon sector in the eastern parts of the country were developed. Though, second world war slowed down the development of the electricity sector, because machinery and spare parts mostly came from Europe and North America.

The National Interconnected System (SIN) was created in 1965 and continued its expansion during the ‘70s and ‘80s. However, expansion decreased since the mid-1970 due economical crisis.

=== Unbundling and privatization ===
Until 1994, the vertically integrated public utility, ENDE (Empresa Nacional de Electricidad) dominated the sector. In 1994, Bolivia initiated an infrastructure reform program that included the privatization of the major state owned enterprises. The Electricity Law 1994/1604 mandated the privatization of the electricity system and the unbundling of generation, transmission and distribution activities. The law aimed to increase efficiency in the sector, promote competition and encourage investment.

As a result of privatization, three generation companies were created: Corani, Guaracachi and Valle Hermoso. Each of them received a part of ENDE's generation activities (the law limited the market share of each to 35%). Initially, these firms were granted exclusive rights, but by 1999 entry was liberalized and some other small companies entered the market. In regards to transmission, network operation was transferred from ENDE to Transportadora de Electricidad, a private company, which acquired exclusive rights. Finally, several distribution firms were created after the reform. All those firms operate under tariff regulation and are subject to tariff controls. CRE (Cooperative for Rural Electrification), a pre-existing distribution cooperative, maintained its position as an independent regional monopoly. CESSA (Compañía Eléctrica de Sucre S.A.) and SEPSA (Servicios Eléctricos Potosí S.A. ), two pre-existing municipal distribution firms also maintained their monopolies while ELFEC (Empresa Luz y Fuerza Eléctrica Cochabamba), which was a municipal company previously to privatization, started to operate as a private firm. Lastly, the private COBEE (Compañía Boliviana de Energía Eléctrica), which operated both in generation and distribution, gave rise, after its divestiture, to Electropaz (in La Paz) and ELFEO (Empresa Luz y Fuerza Eléctrica Oruro) (in Oruro).

All these reforms, together with the introduction of a load dispatch coordination office, shaped a wholesale electricity market that seeks to simulate competitive conditions.

=== Rural electrification efforts ===
In 2002, the government established Bolivia's Rural Electrification Plan (PLABER) with the objective of contributing to the socio-economic development of rural areas through access to electricity and its efficient and productive uses. The short-term goal of the program was to make 200,000 new connections within five years (increasing electricity access in rural areas from 23% to 45%). It had been estimated that, by the end of the program, PLABER would have reached its goals by 70% of the initial objective. However, the model established by this program did not have significant effects in increasing coverage, expanding infrastructure and improving service quality in rural and isolated areas.

A new Rural Electrification Decree was approved in 2005 (Supreme Decree No. 28567). This new decree aims at increasing rural access through the extension and densification of electric networks, development of renewable energy and a change in the energy mix (substitution of diesel by natural gas, biomass and other renewable energies) and an increase in distribution capacity. The Rural Electrification Decree and its associated regulatory framework encourages stakeholders in the energy sector to establish partnerships with other government agencies to implement the rural electrification plan. An agreement between the Ministry of Public Works, Services and Housing and the Ministry of Education will allow for the installation of solar PV systems in rural areas in conjunction with the literacy program, “I can” (Yo, sí puedo). Under the pilot phase, 500 solar panels are expected to be installed.

=== Recent developments ===
In 2006, under President Evo Morales, a new Law for Universal Access to Electricity (Ley de Acceso Universal) was proposed. Under the framework of this Law, the program called ‘Electricity for a Decent Living” has been designed to improve both rural and urban electrification. The short-term goal (2006–2010) of the program is to increase rural electrification to 53% (connection of 210,000 new households) and urban electrification to 97% (connection of 460,000 new households). The medium-term goal (2010–2015) is to achieve universal access in urban areas and a 70% access in rural ones. In the final stages, rural access would have increased to 87% by 2020 and universal coverage would be reached by 2025. The Law also mandates de creation of a Common Fund for Universal Access to Public Electricity Service (FOCO) and creates a co-financing mechanism of the National Government with Prefectures, municipalities and the private sector. However, the Law has not been approved yet, although it is expected that the Law and the mechanisms it creates will be approved soon.

In 2021, the Sistema Interconectado Nacional covered most parts of the country, only in the isolated southern and eastern outskirts, isolated grids remain. In Villazon and Yacuiba, 69 kV connections to the Argentinian grid exist.

== Tariffs, cost recovery and subsidies ==
=== Tariffs ===
Electricity tariffs in Bolivia are far lower than average tariffs in Latin America. The average residential tariff in 2006 was US$0.0614 per kWh (compared to US$0.115 per kWh weighted average in LAC), while the average tariff for the industry was US$0.044 per kWh (compared to US$0.107 per kWh weighted average in LAC).

Electricity prices charged by the distribution companies to their regulated clients include energy costs (including generation and transmission costs) and all the distribution costs, including a specific return on investment. However, as it was mentioned before, some distribution companies resell electricity to communal organizations or rural enterprises. The price and conditions of those transactions are not regulated, which causes an important legal void in the sector.

=== Subsidies ===
In March 2006, the Bolivian government approved Tarifa Dignidad (“Dignity Tariff”) by Supreme Decree 28653. This tariff grants a 25% discount in their electricity bills to those consumers whose monthly consumption is below 70 kWh in the urban areas and 30 kWh in the rural ones. This subsidy, which will be covered for four years by the electricity companies that operate in Bolivia, will benefit about 480,000 households.

== Investment and financing ==
In the years following the privatization of 1994, investment grew considerably due to the obligations imposed on the privatized companies. Public investment remained constant, mainly directed to rural electrification, while private investment was mainly devoted to generation.

In the period 1995-2004, total investment in transmission represented only a modest 2% (US$14 million) of the total investment in the electricity sector. Generation and distribution received 58% and 40% of total investment respectively. For the year 2004 in particular, total public investment in the electricity sector was around $US 20million which was matched by another $US20 million from private sources. Those two figures add up to less than 0.5% of Bolivia's GDP in 2004.

Distribution companies acquire investment commitments for each tariff period. For the period 2003-2005, total investment by the main distribution companies was US$39.7 million. This was divided as follows:

- CRE: US$17.5 million (22% below initially approved amount)
- ELFEC: US$10.2 million (5% below initially approved amount)
- Electropaz: US$10.4 million (11% below initially approved amount)
- Elfeo: US$1.53 million (3% below initially approved amount)

== Summary of private participation in the electricity sector ==
The Electricity Law 1994/1604 mandated the privatization of the electricity system and the unbundling of generation, transmission and distribution activities, which had all been in the hands of ENDE (Empresa Nacional de Electricidad) the vertically integrated public utility.

Three of the eight generation companies in the interconnected system represent 70% of total generation, with COBEE (Compañía Boliviana de Energía Eléctrica) being the most important. Transmission in the National Interconnected System is in the hands of just two companies as entry in this sector is institutionally restricted. As for distribution, the six existing companies enjoy a geographic monopoly in their concession areas. The largest company is Electropaz, which is majority-owned by Spain's Iberdrola.

In May 2010 president Evo Morales nationalized 80% of Bolivian generation by capacity, in his Government's attempt to regain ownership of public service companies. Corani, Guarachi, and Valle Hermoso, where expropriated from their former British and French owners. In the same fashion, in May 2012 the transmission company Transmisora de Electricidad S.A., from Spanish capitals, was similarly expropriated.

Activity	Private participation (%)
Generation	20%
Transmission	53%*
Distribution	100%
Investment	Private participation (%)
Generation, transmission and distribution (2004)	50%

(*) 53% of the transmission network is operated by ISA Bolivia, a subsidiary of ISA Colombia, which is controlled by the Colombian government.

== Electricity and the environment ==
=== Responsibility for the environment ===
The Viceministry of Land Planning and Environment, within the Planning and Development Ministry, holds the environmental responsibilities in Bolivia.

=== Greenhouse gas emissions ===
OLADE (Organización Latinoamericana de Energía) estimated that CO_{2} emissions from electricity production in 2003 were 1.73 million tons of CO_{2}, which represents 22 percent of total emissions for the energy sector.

=== CDM projects in electricity ===
Currently, there are just two CDM-registered projects in Bolivia, one of them in the electricity sector. That is the Rio Taquesi Hydroelectric Power Project, in the province of Sud Yungas, with an effective capacity of 89.5 megawatts and estimated emission reductions of 141,691 metric tonnes CO_{2}e per annum

== External assistance ==
External assistance to the electricity sector in Bolivia is heavily focused on rural electrification with no funding for large-scale generation, which has been fully privatized.

=== World Bank ===
Currently, the World Bank is involved in two projects in the energy sector in Bolivia:

- A project to assist the implementation of Decentralized Infrastructure for Rural Transformation financed by a US$20 m IDA credit and approved in June 2003. The project aims at improving the delivery of infrastructure services. Its first objective is the development of effective strategies to improve and accelerate electricity access, with a focus on renewable sources.
- The “Decentralized Electricity for Universal Access” project, funded by the Global Partnership on Output-based Aid, which is administered by the World Bank, plans to extend electricity access to at least 7,000 poor households, micro-enterprises and social uses in remote and dispersed rural areas (benefiting some 50,000 Bolivian citizens in these areas) through the installation of solar home systems (SHS). This is expected to be achieved through a public-private partnership under the Government's new Universal Access Policy.

=== IDB ===
The Inter-American Development Bank provides technical assistance through three projects in the energy sector in Bolivia:

- A technical cooperation project directed at the Support for the Bolivian Rural Electrification Program, approved in 2004 with US$100,000 funding. The project aimed to develop a master plan for natural gas projects and key investment projects to optimize the network.
- A technical cooperation project approved in 2004 aimed at developing an Rural Electrification Master Plan received US$149,800 in funds from the IADB.
- The IDB also approved a funding of US$138,900 in 2005 for a project to stimulate the development of CDM projects Development of CDM Projects.

=== CAF ===
In 2005 and 2007, the Corporación Andina de Fomento (CAF) assigned US$32 million and US$15 million respectively to the increase of electricity services coverage through the construction of two transmission lines. The first one is the 115 kV Caranavi (La Paz)-Trinidad (Beni) line, which has 374 km. The second one is the 230 kV Carrasco and Santibáñez line, with 225 km.

=== Others ===
The German Agency for International Cooperation (GIZ) and the Viceministry of Electricity and Alternative Energy recently signed an agreement to execute a Project for Network Densification in rural areas. Distribution cooperatives will also play an important role in this project, which is part of the program “Electricity to live with dignity”. To facilitate the access to electricity, the Viceministry and GIZ will provide a US$20 subsidy per household to enable their connection to the existing network.

The German development bank KfW is also financing a 5 million Euro project to improve rural access to electricity in 2005-8. The project involves the construction of six micro-hydroelectric plants and the completion of studies for another eleven.

== Sources ==
- Barja, G. & Urquiola, M. 2003. Capitalization and Privatization in Bolivia. An approximation to an Evaluation
- UDAPE, 2004. Sector Eléctrico, 2000-2004

== See also ==
- Bolivia
- Water supply and sanitation in Bolivia
