= 2004 Bolivian gas referendum =

A referendum on natural gas reserves was held in Bolivia on 18 July 2004. Voters were asked five questions on the government's policy on natural gas, with all five approved.

== Background ==
Holding a referendum on the use of the country's gas reserves was one of the first promises made by President Carlos Mesa upon assuming the presidency in the aftermath of the Bolivian Gas War of October 2003 that saw his predecessor, Gonzalo Sánchez de Lozada, forced to resign and to flee the country.

The referendum was largely intended to quell the political unrest seen during the Gas War. Fears of an uprising led the Bolivian government to take measures essentially forcing the population to vote (announcing fines and other penalties for those who refused or boycotted) and warned that protesters against the referendum would be imprisoned.

== Results ==
Do you agree that the Hydrocarbons Law (No. 1689), enacted by Gonzalo Sánchez de Lozada, should be repealed?

| Choice | Votes | % |
|---|---|---|
| For | 1,788,694 | 86.6 |
| Against | 275,742 | 13.4 |
| Invalid/blank votes | 614,082 | – |
| Total | 2,678,518 | 100 |
| Registered voters/turnout | 4,458,293 | 60.1 |
Source: Nohlen

Do you agree that the Bolivian State should recover ownership over all hydrocarbons at the wellhead?

| Choice | Votes | % |
|---|---|---|
| For | 1,913,642 | 92.2 |
| Against | 162,130 | 7.8 |
| Invalid/blank votes | 594,359 | – |
| Total | 2,678,518 | 100 |
| Registered voters/turnout | 4,458,293 | 60.1 |
Source: Nohlen

Do you agree that Yacimientos Petrolíferos Fiscales Bolivianos should be re-established, reclaiming state ownership of the Bolivian people's stakes in the part-privatized oil companies, so that it can take part in all stages of the hydrocarbon production chain?

| Choice | Votes | % |
|---|---|---|
| For | 1,793,594 | 87.3 |
| Against | 260,610 | 12.7 |
| Invalid/blank votes | 616,079 | – |
| Total | 2,678,518 | 100 |
| Registered voters/turnout | 4,458,293 | 60.1 |
Source: Nohlen

Do you agree with President Carlos Mesa's policy of using gas as a strategic recourse to achieve a sovereign and viable route of access to the Pacific Ocean?

| Choice | Votes | % |
|---|---|---|
| For | 1,055,529 | 54.8 |
| Against | 870,772 | 45.2 |
| Invalid/blank votes | 743,805 | – |
| Total | 2,678,518 | 100 |
| Registered voters/turnout | 4,458,293 | 60.1 |
Source: Nohlen

Do you or do you not agree that Bolivia should export gas as part of a national policy framework that ensures the gas needs of Bolivians; encourages the industrialization of gas in the nation's territory; levies taxes and/or royalties of up to 50% of the production value of oil and gas on oil companies, for the nation's benefit; and earmarks revenues from the export and industrialization of gas mainly for education, health, roads, and jobs?

| Choice | Votes | % |
|---|---|---|
| For | 1,179,893 | 61.7 |
| Against | 731,021 | 38.3 |
| Invalid/blank votes | 758,353 | – |
| Total | 2,678,518 | 100 |
| Registered voters/turnout | 4,458,293 | 60.1 |
Source: Nohlen
