= Pampalarama Dam =

- Location within Bolivia
- Official name: Pampalarama Dam
- Country: Bolivia
- Location: La Paz, Bolivia
- Coordinates: 16.3292°S 68.0783°W
- Purpose: Drinking water
- Status: Operational
- Construction began: July 14, 2017
- Opening date: April 4, 2019
- Owners: Government of Bolivia; Water and Sanitation Social Public Enterprise

Dam and spillways
- Type of dam: Reinforced concrete
- Impounds: Khaluyo River
- Height: 36 m (118 ft)
- Length: 307 m (1,007 ft)

Reservoir
- Total capacity: 3,405,952 m^{3} (2,761 acre⋅ft)
- Surface area: 6.19 km^{2} (2 mi^{2})
- Normal elevation: 763 m (2,503 ft)

The Pampalarama Dam, or also known as Uma Punku, is a dam located in the Department of La Paz in Bolivia, which supplies water to the historic center of the city of La Paz. The infrastructure has a height of 36 m (118 ft) and a storage capacity of 3.4 million cubic metres of water. Its construction began on July 14, 2017, being inaugurated on April 4, 2019, during the third government of President Evo Morales.

== History ==
=== Drinking water shortages in La Paz and El Alto ===
The idea of the construction of the Pampalarama dam arises as a result of the urgent need of the cities of La Paz and El Alto to have access to the elemental and vital liquid, since it is worth remembering that in the month of November 2016, both cities they suffered the terrible scarcity of water for human consumption, this due to the low amount of said elemental liquid in the dams.

On July 16, 2017, after inaugurating the Alto Hampaturi Dam, the President of Bolivia Evo Morales Ayma publicly announced the construction of another 3 more dams for the Department of La Paz, with the aim of guaranteeing water to the main cities.

The start of the works for the construction of the Pampalarama dam began in July 2017 and it took around 21 months to finish building said infrastructure, finally being inaugurated on April 4, 2019, by President Evo Morales Ayma in an act public.

== Technical data ==
The Pampalarama dam has a storage capacity of 3.4 million cubic meters and is built of reinforced concrete with a height of 36 m (118 ft) and a length of 307 m (1,007 ft), its surface area is 6.19 km^{2} (2.39 sq mi). The construction of the work had a cost of 63.1 million bolivianos (around 9.1 million dollars) and was financed through the National Productive and Social Investment Fund. The dam also has a meteorological station and state-of-the-art measuring instruments that measure the water level, pressure, and detect movement inside the dam, all subject to environmental mitigation measures.

== See also ==
- Condoriri Dam
