= 2004 Dębak hunger strikes =

2004 hunger strikes in Poland

2004 Dębak Asylum Seeker Hunger Strikes The hunger strikes in the Dębak reception centre for asylum seekers occurred in December 2004 in response to the insufficient conditions and undignified treatment in centres for asylum seekers in Poland. The approximately 200 striking asylum seekers–primarily from Chechnya–were refusing to eat for close to two weeks (it is unclear exactly how long the strikes lasted based on available sources). The hunger strikes ended after a discussion in which the centre's management team promised the strikers that their healthcare, clothing distribution, and food quality would all be improved. The strikes were part of a larger resistance by asylum seekers in Poland who were demanding passage to western European countries, which they had been denied based on Dublin II regulations.
