= Socialist Women's Network =

Women's wing of the Scottish Socialist Party

The Socialist Women's Network is the women's wing of the Scottish Socialist Party and campaigns on issues particularly affecting women. Although primarily made up of party members, the SWN is open to all women who are interested in women's issues from a socialist perspective. Although the main ideology of the network is socialist feminist, there are a variety of interpretations of feminism within the network.

The SWN has existed since the beginning of the SSP; however, it was relatively small until the Sheridan crisis occurred. The issues raised within that period of the party, together with the demonisation of leading women within the party led to a reinvigoration of the network and a renewed interest in feminist issues within the party.

The network has campaigned on issues as diverse as sweatshops, female deaths in custody, right to choose, prostitution, sexual violence and the rights of migrant women. It holds a regular event on International Women's Day and organises dayschools and residential weekends which are open to all women interested in feminist issues to meet up and discuss current issues in feminism and women's rights, both in formal and informal settings.
