= Misicuni Dam =

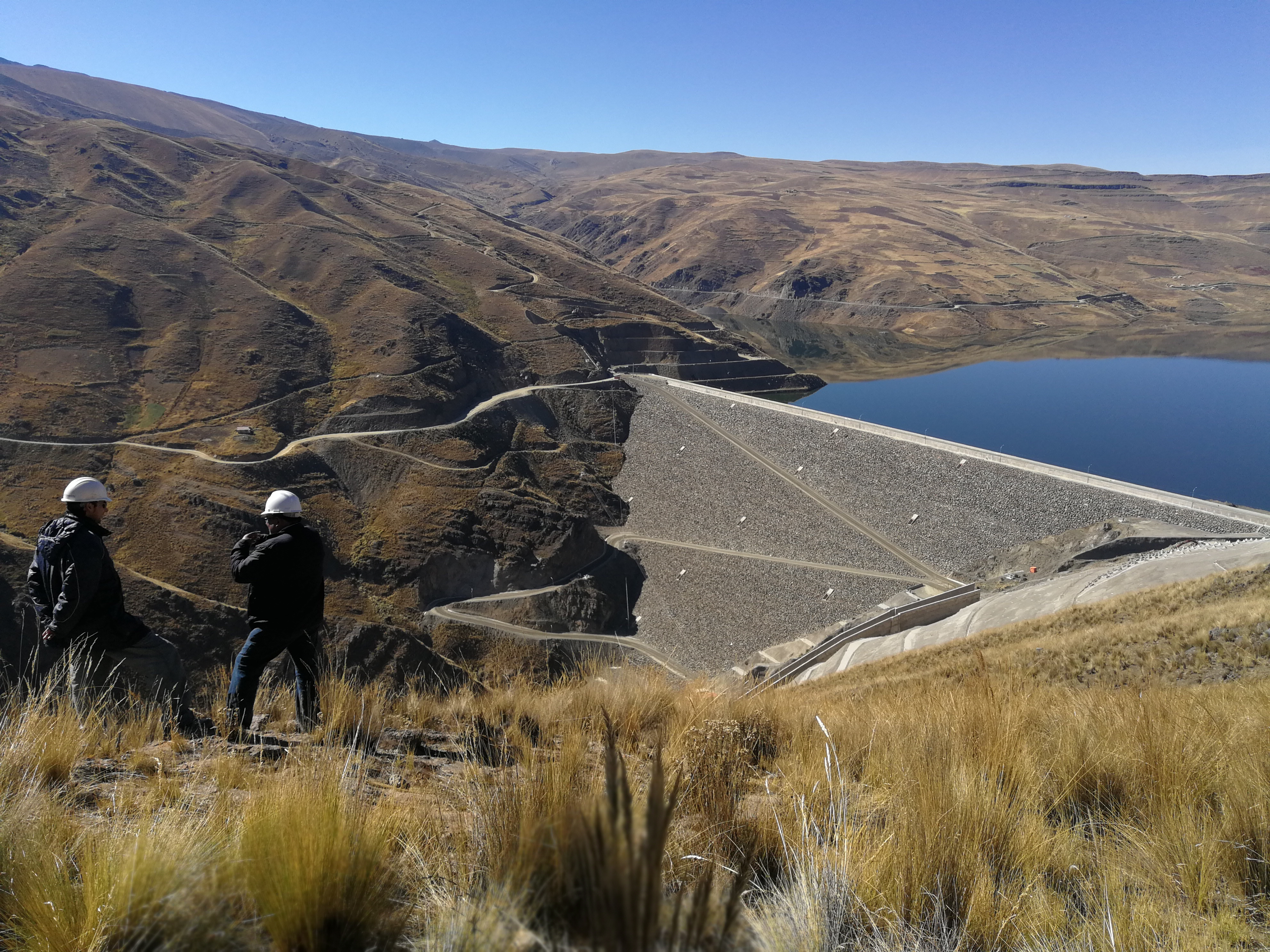

- Location within Bolivia
- Country: Bolivia
- Location: Cochabamba Department, Cochabamba
- Coordinates: 17°5′48.66″S 66°19′48.53″W
- Purpose: Power, irrigation, municipal water
- Status: Operational
- Construction began: June 2009
- Opening date: 2017
- Owner: Empresa Misicuni

Dam and spillways
- Type of dam: Embankment, concrete-face rock-fill
- Impounds: Misicuni River
- Height: 120 m (390 ft)
- Length: 434 m (1,424 ft)
- Elevation at crest: 3,784 m (12,415 ft)

Reservoir
- Total capacity: 185,500,000 m^{3} (150,400 acre⋅ft)
- Active capacity: 31,500,000 m^{3} (25,500 acre⋅ft)
- Inactive capacity: 154,000,000 m^{3} (125,000 acre⋅ft)
- Surface area: 4.6 km^{2} (1.8 mi^{2})
- Normal elevation: 3,774 m (12,382 ft)

Misicuni Hydroelectric Plant
- Coordinates: 17°18′54.54″S 66°15′36.55″W
- Commission date: 2017
- Type: Conventional, diversion
- Turbines: 3 x 40 MW Pelton-type
- Installed capacity: 120 MW
- Website https://www.misicuni.gob.bo/ (Spanish)

The Misicuni Multiplepurpose Project, better known as the Misicuni Dam, is a concrete-face rock-fill dam constructed on the Misicuni River about 35 km (22 mi) northwest of the city of Cochabamba, Bolivia. The dam will divert water from the Misicuni River to the Cochabamba Valley for several purposes to include providing water for irrigation and municipal water uses. In addition, the dam has an associated 120 MW hydroelectric power station, powered by 3 turbines 40 MW each. Construction on the dam began in June 2009 but was halted in November 2013 due to contract disputes. The company finished the construction and is started the operations in September 2017.

== Characteristics and costs ==
The project has three components:

- Phase I includes an already completed 20 km tunnel with the capacity to provide 2 cubic meters per second of drinking water and 1 cubic meter per second for irrigation to Cochabamba and the surrounding areas. Its cost was US$84 million.
- Phase II includes a 120-meter-high concrete-face rock-fill dam with a 460-hectare reservoir with a storage capacity of 154 million cubic meters, as well as pipelines, pumping stations, a water treatment plant and an irrigation network to irrigate 4,000 hectares (under construction as of 2013). Its cost was also estimated at US$84 million,
- Phase III includes a hydropower plant with an installed capacity of 120 MW at an estimated cost of US$200 million (under construction since April 2010). Water will be diverted from the reservoir through a 3.8 km (2.4 mi) long penstock to the plant.

The dam will be the highest and largest dam in Bolivia. Misicuni project director Ramiro Saniz said in 2009 that the water from the Misicuni river is not sufficient to fill the reservoir and that other sources are needed.

== Background and construction progress ==
The public company in charge of developing the project is Proyecto Misicuni, an entity created by law in 1987. The contractor for the US$90 million dam component is the Consorcio Hidroelectrico Misicuni (CHM). The Misicuni consortium, led with 51 percent ownership by Grandi Lavori Fincosit S.p.A. of Italy, was the sole bidder for the project. Bidding was limited to Italian companies and CHM was the only company to submit a bid. The consortium also includes Bolivian, Colombian and Venezuelan firms.

The dam component was originally expected to be completed in 2014. However, in November 2013 the contract was canceled amid delays because CHM "failed to pay for pension funds, health insurances and other labour benefits and to contract key technical personnel."

== Benefits ==
The tunnel provides 4.5-7.5 million cubic meters of water per year to Cochabamba since 2005, depending on whether the flow of the river is low or high and supplying about 10 percent of the city's drinking water. Once the dam will be completed, the amount of drinking water available will increase tenfold to 63 million cubic meters per year.

== Environmental and social impact ==
1365 people live in the reservoir area that will be flooded and will be relocated. The Tunari National Park will also be affected.

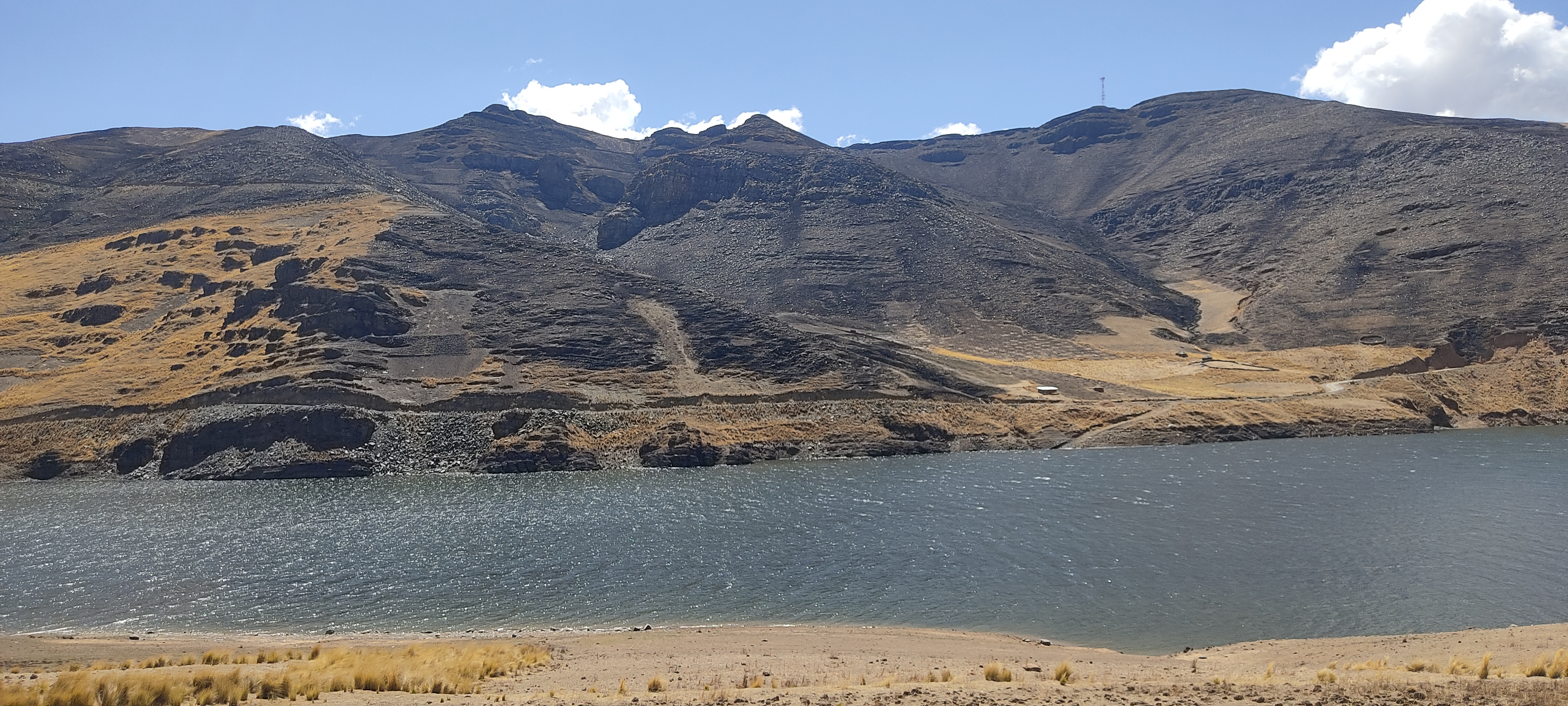
A photograph of part of the dam in 2022.

== Financing ==
The dam is partially financed by the Italian government through a 25 million Euro loan and the Development Bank of Latin America and the Caribbean (CAF). Total funding from Italy for Phased II and III is USD 93 million. Bolivia will have to pay back the loan over in 20 years with a 0.10% interest rate.

The construction of the penstock, hydropower plant and power transmission line is funded by a US$101 million loan from the Inter-American Development Bank approved in 2009. These works were expected to be completed by 2015, but were only 30 percent completed as of April 2013.

== Climate ==
Climate data for Misicuni, elevation 3,795 m (12,451 ft), (1972–2015)
| Month | Jan | Feb | Mar | Apr | May | Jun | Jul | Aug | Sep | Oct | Nov | Dec | Year |
|---|---|---|---|---|---|---|---|---|---|---|---|---|---|
| Mean daily maximum °C (°F) | 16.1 (61.0) | 16.6 (61.9) | 16.1 (61.0) | 17.9 (64.2) | 17.1 (62.8) | 17.2 (63.0) | 16.2 (61.2) | 15.6 (60.1) | 17.1 (62.8) | 17.6 (63.7) | 19.0 (66.2) | 17.0 (62.6) | 17.0 (62.5) |
| Daily mean °C (°F) | 9.9 (49.8) | 10.1 (50.2) | 9.4 (48.9) | 9.3 (48.7) | 6.6 (43.9) | 6.0 (42.8) | 5.4 (41.7) | 5.9 (42.6) | 8.4 (47.1) | 9.4 (48.9) | 11.0 (51.8) | 10.3 (50.5) | 8.5 (47.2) |
| Mean daily minimum °C (°F) | 3.6 (38.5) | 3.6 (38.5) | 2.8 (37.0) | 0.7 (33.3) | −3.9 (25.0) | −5.3 (22.5) | −5.4 (22.3) | −3.7 (25.3) | −0.2 (31.6) | 1.3 (34.3) | 3.1 (37.6) | 3.6 (38.5) | 0.0 (32.0) |
| Average precipitation mm (inches) | 146.0 (5.75) | 120.4 (4.74) | 90.2 (3.55) | 25.5 (1.00) | 9.4 (0.37) | 7.3 (0.29) | 8.5 (0.33) | 19.2 (0.76) | 29.2 (1.15) | 39.7 (1.56) | 59.1 (2.33) | 95.8 (3.77) | 650.3 (25.6) |
| Average precipitation days | 22.7 | 20.1 | 16.8 | 8.0 | 2.4 | 2.0 | 2.4 | 5.1 | 7.6 | 10.5 | 13.6 | 19.2 | 130.4 |
Source: Servicio Nacional de Meteorología e Hidrología de Bolivia
