= Vatukoula mine =

Gold mine in Viti Levu, Fiji

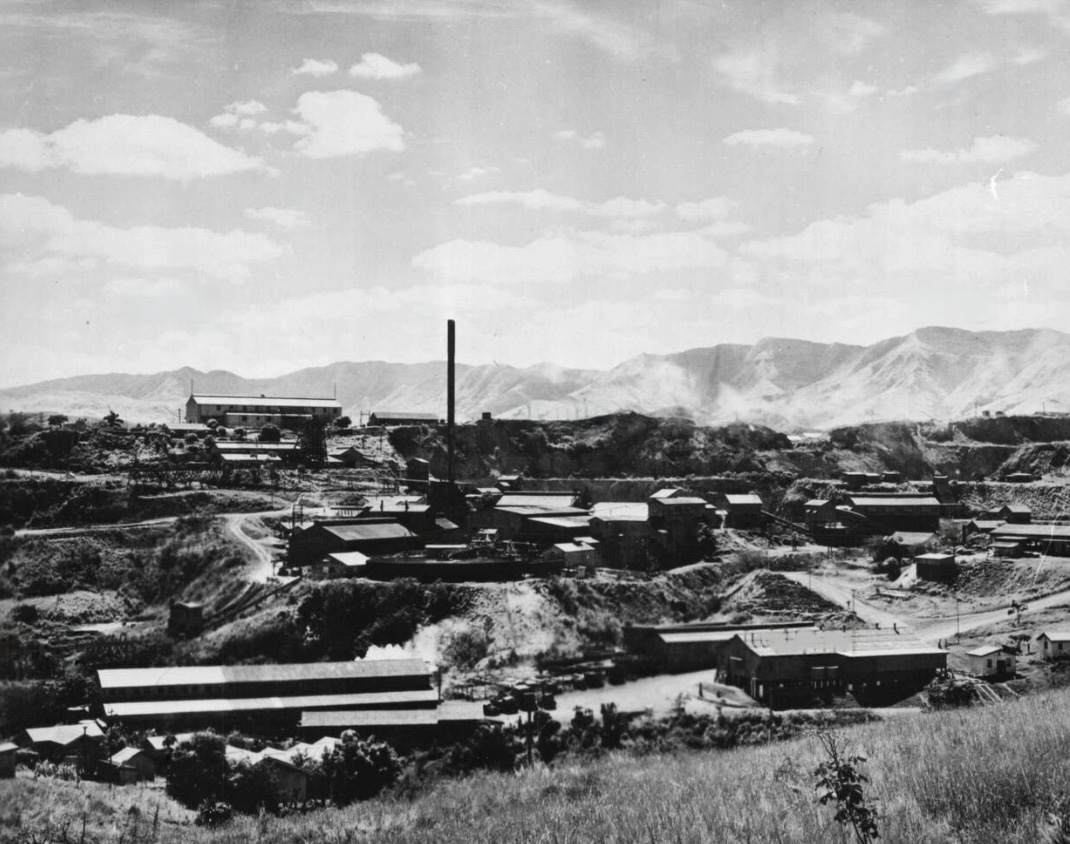
- The Vatukoula mine in 1951.
- Interactive map of Vatukoula mine
- Location: Viti Levu, Fiji; 17°30′27.86″S 177°51′18.99″E
- Products: Gold

The Vatukoula mine is a gold mine in Fiji. It is one of the country's largest gold mines, and one of the largest in the world. The mine is located in Vatukoula in the south of the country, on Viti Levu, the largest island of Fiji.

The mine was closed in December 2006, and was subsequently reopened in April 2008 as the price of gold increased. The mine has an estimated 4.2 million ounces of gold.

The mine was the site of the longest strike action in Fijian history and one of the longest in world history, the Vatukoula mine strike. For thirty-three years, between 1991 and 2024, around 360 miners employed at the mine went on strike over poor health and safety standards, poor housing conditions, and complaints of discrimination.
