= Bolivian gas war =

Social confrontation in Bolivia reaching its peak in 2003

Bolivian gas conflict
- Part of the Pink tide
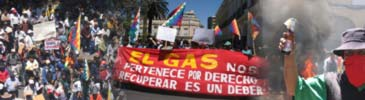
- 2003 demonstrations against president Gonzalo Sánchez de Lozada. "The gas is ours by right, to recover it is our duty."
- Date: September 2003 – May 2006
- Location: Bolivia
- Caused by: Privatization of natural gas; Coca eradication; Corruption; Authoritarianism
- Goals: Nationalization of natural gas
- Methods: Demonstrations; Strike actions; Traffic obstructions
- Result: Protestor victory: Resignation of Gonzalo Sánchez de Lozada; 2004 Bolivian gas referendum; Election of Evo Morales as President of Bolivia

Parties
Protestors: Bolivian Workers' Center; Confederation of Indigenous Peoples; Federation of Neighborhood Councils; Landless Peasant Movement; Movement for Socialism; National Unity Front; Pachakuti Indigenous Movement	Government of Bolivia: Bolivian Armed Forces; Bolivian National Police; Bolivian Socialist Falange; Free Bolivia Movement; Nationalist Democratic Action; Revolutionary Nationalist Movement; Revolutionary Left Front; Revolutionary Left Movement; Solidarity Civic Unity

Lead figures
Evo Morales; Álvaro García Linera; Oscar Olivera; Felipe Quispe; Samuel Doria Medina	Gonzalo Sánchez de Lozada; Carlos Mesa; Eduardo Rodríguez Veltzé; Jorge Quiroga; Gonzalo Arredondo Milán

The Bolivian Gas War (Spanish: Guerra del Gas) or Bolivian gas conflict was a social confrontation in Bolivia reaching its peak in 2003, centering on the exploitation of the country's vast natural gas reserves. The expression can be extended to refer to the general conflict in Bolivia over the exploitation of gas resources, thus including the 2005 protests and the election of Evo Morales as president. Before these protests, Bolivia had seen a series of similar earlier protests during the Cochabamba protests of 2000, which were against the privatization of the municipal water supply.

The conflict had its roots in grievances over the government's economic policies concerning natural gas, as well as coca eradication policies, corruption and violent military responses against strikes.

The "Bolivian gas war" thus came to a head in October 2003, leading to the resignation of President Gonzalo Sánchez de Lozada (aka "Goni"). Strikes and road blocks mounted by indigenous and labour groups (including the COB trade union) brought the country to a standstill. Violent suppression by the Bolivian armed forces left some 60 people dead in October 2003, mostly inhabitants of El Alto, located on the Altiplano above the seat of government La Paz.

The governing coalition disintegrated forcing Goni to resign and leave the country on October 18, 2003. He was succeeded by the vice president, Carlos Mesa, who put the gas issue to a referendum on July 18, 2004. In May 2005, under duress from protesters, the Bolivian congress enacted a new hydrocarbons law, increasing the state's royalties from natural gas exploitation. However, protesters, who included Evo Morales and Felipe Quispe, demanded full nationalization of hydrocarbon resources, and the increased participation of Bolivia's indigenous majority, mainly composed of Aymaras and Quechuas, in the political life of the country. On June 6, 2005, Mesa was forced to resign as tens of thousands of protesters caused daily blockades to La Paz from the rest of the country. Morales' election at the end of 2005 was met with enthusiasm by the social movements, because he was, as the leader of left-wing MAS, one of the staunchest opponents to the exportation of the gas without corresponding industrialization in Bolivia. On May 1, 2006, President Morales signed a decree stating that all gas reserves were to be nationalized: "the state recovers ownership, possession and total and absolute control" of hydrocarbons. The 2006 announcement was met by applause on La Paz's main plaza, where Vice President Alvaro Garcia told the crowd that the government's energy-related revenue would jump US$320 million to US$780 million in 2007, continuing a trend where revenues had expanded nearly sixfold between 2002 and 2006.

== Background ==
=== Gas reserves of Bolivia ===
The central issue was Bolivia's large natural gas reserves and the prospect for their future sale and use. The Bolivian gas reserves are the second largest in South America after Venezuela, and exploration after the privatization of the national oil company YPFB showed that proven natural gas reserves were 600% higher than previously known. The cash-poor, state-owned company could not afford the exploration costs. These reserves mainly are located in the southeastern Tarija Department, which contains 85% of gas and petrol reserves. According to the United States Department of Energy, another 10.6% is located within the department of Santa Cruz and 2.5% in the Cochabamba Department. After further exploration from 1996 to 2002, the estimated size of the probable gas reserves was calculated to be 12.5 times larger, passing from 4.24×10^{12} cu ft (120 km^{3}) to 52.3×10^{12} cu ft (1,480 km^{3}). This number has declined somewhat to 48×10^{12} cu ft (1,400 km^{3}) probable reserves. The proven reserves are 26.7×10^{12} cu ft (760 km^{3}). With the declining importance of tin mines, those reserves accounted for the majority of foreign investment in Bolivia.

The price which Bolivia is paid for its natural gas is roughly US$3.25 per million British thermal units ($11.1/MWh) to Brazil and $3.18 per million BTU to Argentina. Other sources state that Brazil pays between $3.15 and $3.60 per million BTU, not including $1.50 per million BTU in Petrobras extraction and transportation costs. As a comparison, the price of gas in the US as a whole in 2006 varied between US$5.85 and $7.90 per million British thermal units ($20.0 and $27.0/MWh), although some years earlier the price of natural gas spiked at $14 per million BTU in California due to lack of pipeline capacity to and within California as well as due to electricity outages. While according to Le Monde, Brazil and Argentina pay US$2 per thousand cubic meter of gas, which costs from $12 to $15 in California.

In 1994, a contract with Brazil was passed, two years before 1996's privatization of the 70-year-old, state-owned Yacimientos Petroliferos Fiscales de Bolivia (YPFB). The construction of the Bolivia-Brazil gas pipeline cost US$2.2 billion.

A consortium called Pacific LNG was formed to exploit the newly discovered reserves. The consortium comprised the British companies BG Group and BP, and Spain's Repsol YPF. Repsol is one of three companies that dominate the gas sector in Bolivia, along with Petrobras and TotalEnergies. A plan costing US$6 billion was drawn to build a pipeline to the Pacific coast, where the gas would be processed and liquefied before being shipped to Mexico and the United States (Baja California and California), through a Chilean port, for example Iquique. The 2003 Lozada deal was opposed heavily by Bolivian society, in part because of nationalism (Bolivia feels resentment after the territorial losses of the War of the Pacific in the late 19th century, which deprived it of the Litoral province and hence access to the sea).

Government ministers hoped to use the gas profits to bolster the sagging Bolivian economy and claimed the money would be invested exclusively in health and education. Opponents argued that under the current law, the exportation of the gas as a raw material would give Bolivia only 18% of the future profits, or US$40 million to US$70 million per year. They further argued that exporting the gas so cheaply would be the latest case of foreign exploitation of Bolivia's natural resources, starting with its silver and gold from the 17th century. They demanded that a plant be built in Bolivia to process the gas and that domestic consumption had to be met before export. As Le Monde puts it, "two reasons plead for the industrial exploitation of the gas, which the multinational companies now have the capacities of doing. The first is related to the necessity of satisfying the Bolivians' energy needs. The second demonstrates the interest of exporting a more profitable product rather than selling raw material". According to the French newspaper, only La Paz, El Alto, Sucre, Potosí, Camiri and Santa Cruz are now connected to the gas network; making an interior network which would reach all Bolivians would cost $1.5 billion, notwithstanding a central gas pipeline to link the various regions together. According to Carlos Miranda, an independent expert quoted by Le Monde, the best industrialisation project is the petrochemical complex proposed by the Brazilian Braskem firm, which would create 40 000 direct or indirect jobs and cost $1.4 billion. This figure is equivalent to the amount so far invested by Repsol, TotalEnergies and Petrobras.

=== Santa Cruz autonomy movement ===
The eastern departments of Santa Cruz, Beni, Tarija, and Pando recently had been mobilizing in favor of autonomy. An important issue was opposition to the seizure of resources though nationalization. Community leaders are supported by the Comite Pro Santa Cruz, local co-ops, and by business organizations such as cattle ranchers and farmers. A strike against the new constitution was recently held which was observed in Santa Cruz, Beni, Tarija, and Pando. Tensions have been raised by the cultural and philosophical rift exposed by the push for a new constitution. As a basis for a new constitution, the western, Altiplano-based MAS party envisions a "council of indigenous peoples" along with a curtailment of private ownership, while Santa Cruz looks to western culture and capitalism. Cultural divisions exist because people in eastern Bolivia, called "Cambas" (meaning "friends" in Guarani), are primarily of mestizo descent (mix of European and several native tribes the largest of which are the Guaraní), while the western Altiplano is dominated by a small white elite and a historically oppressed Quechua and Aymara majority.

The first signs of the modern autonomy movement occurred in 2005 when a march for autonomy was attended by hundreds of thousands of people. A result of this was the change in law to allow the election of departmental prefects. Another area of tension was the result of ongoing population shifts and the resulting demands for proportionally greater representation in Bolivia's Congress to reflect these shifts by Santa Cruz. A compromise was reached to allow Santa Cruz to receive some of the seats warranted by population growth, and for the highlands to keep seats despite population losses.

Left-wing intellectuals Walter Chávez and Álvaro García Linera (former Bolivian Vice President and MAS party member) published an article in the Monthly Review asserting that autonomy has been historically a demand of the Santa Cruz region, "contemporarily imbued with far-right, populist sentiments." They also qualified Santa Cruz autonomy as a "bourgeois ideology" of the "free market, foreign investment, racism, etc.", which pits the "modern", "whiter" Santa Cruz elite against the short, dark-skinned and anti-capitalist Aymara and Quechua peoples of the western region of Bolivia.

=== Dispute over pipeline route ===
The dispute arose in early 2002, when the administration of President Jorge Quiroga proposed building the pipeline through neighboring Chile to the port of Mejillones, the most direct route to the Pacific Ocean. However, antagonism towards Chile runs deep in Bolivia because of the loss of Bolivia's Pacific coastline to Chile in the War of the Pacific (1879–1884).

Bolivians began campaigning against the Chilean option, arguing instead that the pipeline should be routed north through the Peruvian port of Ilo, 260 km further from the gas fields than Mejillones, or, better yet, first industrialized in Bolivia. According to Chilean estimates, the Mejillones option would be $600 million cheaper. Peru, however, claimed the difference in cost would be no more than $300 million. Bolivian proponents of the Peruvian option say it would also benefit the economy of the northern region of Bolivia through which the pipeline would pass.

Supporters of the Chile pipeline argued that U.S. financiers would be unlikely to develop processing facilities within Bolivia.

Meanwhile, the Peruvian government, eager to promote territorial and economic integration, offered Bolivia a special economic zone for 99 years for exporting the gas at Ilo, the right of free passage, and the concession of a 10 km^{2} area, including a port, that would be exclusively under Bolivian administration.

President Jorge Quiroga postponed the decision shortly before leaving office in July 2002 and left this highly contentious issue to his successor. It was thought Quiroga did not want to jeopardize his chances of re-election as president in the 2007 elections.

After winning the 2002 presidential election Gonzalo Sánchez de Lozada expressed his preference for the Mejillones option but made no "official" decision. The Gas War led to his resignation in October 2003.

=== Escalation ===
2003 poster for a photo exhibition of the gas war

The social conflict escalated in September 2003 with protests and road blockages paralyzing large parts of the country, leading to increasingly violent confrontations with the Bolivian armed forces. The insurrection was spearheaded by Bolivia's indigenous majority, who accused Sánchez de Lozada of pandering to the US government's "war on drugs" and blamed him for failing to improve living standards in Bolivia. On September 8, 650 Aymaras started a hunger strike to protest against the state detention of a villager. The man detained was one of the heads of the village, and was imprisoned for having sentenced to the death penalty two young men in a "community justice" trial. On September 19, the National Coordination for the Defense of Gas mobilized 30,000 people in Cochabamba and 50,000 in La Paz to demonstrate against the pipeline. The following day six Aymara villagers, including an eight-year-old girl, were killed in a confrontation in the town of Warisata. Government forces used planes and helicopters to circumvent the strikers and evacuate several hundred foreign and Bolivian tourists from Sorata who had been stranded by the road blockades for five days.

In response to the shootings, Bolivia's Labor Union (COB) called a general strike on September 29 that paralyzed the country with road closures. Union leaders insisted they would continue until the government backed down on its decision. Poorly armed Aymara community militias drove the army and police out of Warisata and the towns of Sorata and Achacachi, equipped only with traditional Aymara sling shots and guns from the 1952 Bolivian National Revolution. Eugenio Rojas, leader of the regional strike committee, declared that if the government refused to negotiate in Warisata, then the insurgent Aymara communities would surround La Paz and cut it off from the rest of the country — a tactic employed in the Túpaj Katari uprising of 1781. Felipe Quispe, leader of the Indigenous Pachakuti Movement (MIP), stated that he would not participate in dialogue with the government until the military withdrew from blockaded areas. The government refused to negotiate with Quispe, claiming that he did not have the authority to represent the campesino movement.

As the protests continued, protesters in El Alto, a sprawling indigenous city of 750,000 people on the periphery of La Paz, proceeded to block key access routes to the seat of government, causing severe fuel and food shortages. They also demanded the resignation of Sánchez de Lozada and his ministers, Yerko Kukoc, Minister of Government, and Carlos Sánchez de Berzaín, Minister of Defense, who were held responsible for the Warisata massacre. Protesters also voiced their opposition to the Free Trade Area of the Americas agreement that was at the time under negotiation by the US and South American countries (since the November 2005 Mar del Plata Summit of the Americas, it has been put on stand-by).

== Martial law in El Alto ==
On October 12, 2003, the government imposed martial law in El Alto after sixteen people were shot by the police and several dozen wounded in violent clashes which erupted when a caravan of oil trucks escorted by police and soldiers deploying tanks and heavy-caliber machine guns tried to breach a barricade.

On October 13, the administration of Sánchez de Lozada suspended the gas project "until consultations have been conducted [with the Bolivian people]." However, Vice President Carlos Mesa deplored what he referred to as the "excessive force" used in El Alto (80 dead) and withdrew his support for Sánchez de Lozada. The Minister of Economic Development, Jorge Torrez, of the MIR party, also resigned.

The United States Department of State issued a statement on October 13 declaring its support for Sánchez de Lozada, calling for "Bolivia's political leaders [to] publicly express their support for democratic and constitutional order. The international community and the United States will not tolerate any interruption of constitutional order and will not support any regime that results from undemocratic means".

On October 18, Sánchez de Lozada's governing coalition was fatally weakened when the New Republic Force party withdrew its support. He was forced to resign and was replaced by his vice president, Carlos Mesa, a former journalist. The strikes and roadblocks were lifted. Mesa promised that no civilians would be killed by police or army forces during his presidency. Despite dramatic unrest during his time in office, he respected this promise.

Among his first actions as president, Mesa promised a referendum on the gas issue and appointed several indigenous people to cabinet posts. On July 18, 2004, Mesa put the issue of gas nationalization to a referendum. On May 6, 2005, the Bolivian Congress passed a new law raising taxes from 18% to 32% on profits made by foreign companies on the extraction of oil and gas. Mesa failed to either sign or veto the law, so by law Senate President Hormando Vaca Diez was required to sign it into law on May 17. Many protesters felt this law was inadequate and demanded full nationalization of the gas and oil industry.

== The 2005 Hydrocarbons Law ==
On May 6, 2005, the long-awaited Hydrocarbons Law was finally approved by the Bolivian Congress. On May 17 Mesa again refused to either sign or veto the controversial law, thus constitutionally requiring Senate President Hormando Vaca Díez to sign the measure and put it into effect.

The new law returned legal ownership to the state of all hydrocarbons and natural resources, maintained royalties at 18 percent, but increased taxes from 16 to 32 percent. It gave the government control of the commercialization of the resources and allowed for continuous government control with annual audits. It also ordered companies to consult with indigenous groups who live on land containing gas deposits. The law stated that the 76 contracts signed by foreign firms must be renegotiated before 180 days. Protesters argued that the new law did not go far enough to protect the natural resources from exploitation by foreign corporations, demanding a complete nationalization of the gas and process in Bolivia.

Due to the uncertainty over renegotiation of contracts, foreign firms have practically stopped investing in the gas sector. Foreign investment virtually came to a standstill in the second half of 2005. Shortages in supply – very similar to those observed in Argentina after the 2001 price-fixing – are deepening in diesel, LPG, and begin to be apparent in natural gas. The May–June social unrest affected the supply of hydrocarbons products to the internal market, principally LPG and natural gas to the occidental region. Brazil implemented a contingency plan – led by the Energy and Mines Minister – to mitigate any potential impact from gas export curtailment. Although the supply was never curtailed, the social unrest in Bolivia created a strong sensation that security of supply could not be guaranteed. Occasional social action has continued to affect the continuity of supply, especially valve-closing actions.

== Carlos Mesa's June 2005 resignation ==
=== The protests ===
Over 80,000 people participated in the May 2005 protests. Tens of thousands of people each day walked from El Alto to the seat of government La Paz, where protesters effectively shut down the city, bringing transportation to a halt through strikes and blockades, and engaging in street battles with police. The protestors demanded the nationalisation of the gas industry and reforms to give more power to the indigenous majority, who were mainly Aymaras from the impoverished highlands. They were pushed back by the police with tear gas and rubber bullets, while many of the miners involved in the protests came armed with dynamite.

May 24, 2005 More than 10,000 Aymara peasant farmers from the twenty highland provinces came down from El Alto's Ceja neighborhood into La Paz to protest.

On May 31, 2005, residents of El Alto and the Aymara peasant farmers returned to La Paz. More than 50,000 people covered an area of nearly 100 square kilometers. The next day, the first regiment of the National Police decided, by consensus, not to repress the protests and were internally reprimanded by the government.

On June 2, as the protests raged on, President Mesa announced two measures, designed to placate the indigenous protesters on the one hand and the Santa Cruz autonomy movement on the other: elections for a new constitutional assembly and a referendum on regional autonomy, both set for October 16. However, both sides rejected Mesa's call: the Pro-Santa Cruz Civic Committee declared its own referendum on autonomy for August 12, while in El Alto protesters began to cut off gasoline to La Paz.

Approximately half a million people mobilized in the streets of La Paz, on June 6, and President Mesa subsequently offered his resignation. Riot police used tear gas as miners amongst the demonstrators traditionally set off dynamite in clashes near the presidential palace, while a strike brought traffic to a standstill. However, Congress failed to meet for several days owing to the "insecurity" of meeting as protests raged nearby. Many members of Congress found themselves unable to physically attend the sessions. Senate President Hormando Vaca Díez decided to move the sessions to Bolivia's capital, Sucre, in an attempt to avoid the protesters. Radical farmers occupied oil wells owned by transnational companies, and blockaded border crossings. Mesa ordered the military to airlift food to La Paz, which remained totally blockaded.

Vaca Diez and House of Delegates president, Mario Cossío, were the two next in the line of succession to become president. However, they were strongly disliked by the protesters, and each declared they would not accept succession to the presidency, finally promoting Eduardo Rodríguez, Supreme Court Chief Justice, to the presidency. Considered apolitical and hence trustworthy by most, his administration was a temporary one until elections could be held. Protesters quickly disbanded in many areas, and like many times in Bolivia's past, major political upheavals were taken as a normal part of the political process.

Caretaker President Rodríguez proceeded to implement the Hydrocarbons Law. The new tax IDH has been levied from the companies that are paying 'under reserve'. A number of upstream gas companies have invoked Bilateral Investment Protection Treaties and entered the conciliation phase with the state of Bolivia. The treaties are a step towards a court hearing before the International Centre for Settlement of Investment Disputes (ICSID), dependent of the World Bank, which could force Bolivia to pay indemnities to the companies.

== Concerns of possible US intervention ==
A military training agreement with Asunción (Paraguay), giving immunity to US soldiers, caused some concern after media reports initially reported that a base housing 20,000 US soldiers was being built at Mariscal Estigarribia within 200 km of Argentina and Bolivia, and 300 km of Brazil, near an airport which could receive large planes (B-52, C-130 Hercules, etc.) which the Paraguayan Air Forces do not have. According to the Clarín, an Argentinian newspaper, the US military base is strategic because of its location near the Triple Frontera between Paraguay, Brazil and Argentina; its proximity to the Guarani aquifer; and, at the same "moment that Washington's magnifying glass goes on the Altiplano and points toward Venezuelan Hugo Chávez — the regional demon according to Bush's administration — as the instigator of the instability in the region" (Clarín).

Later reports indicated that 400 US troops would be deployed in Paraguay over 18 months for training and humanitarian missions consisting of 13 detachments numbering less than 50 personnel each. The Paraguayan administration as well as Bush's administration denied that the airport would be used as a US military base, or that there would be any other US base in Paraguay.

== Other countries ==
The social conflicts paralyzed Bolivia's political life for a time. The unpopularity of the neoliberal Washington consensus, a set of economic strategies implemented by Gonzalo de Lozada's administration, set the stage for the 2006 election of president Evo Morales.

In the meantime, Chile promptly started to build several coastal terminals to receive shipments of liquefied natural gas from Indonesia, Australia and other sources.

Other South American countries are contemplating other ways to secure gas supplies: one project aims at linking the Camisea gas reserves in Peru to Argentina, Brazil, Chile, Uruguay and Paraguay. Linking Pisco (south of Peru) to Tocopilla (north of Chile) with a 1200 km pipeline would cost $2 billion. However, experts doubt the Camisea reserves are enough for all the Southern Cone countries.

Another 8,000 km gas pipeline (Gran Gasoducto del Sur) has been proposed that would link Venezuela to Argentina via Brazil. Its cost is estimated between $8 and $12 billion.

While Argentina and Chile are large consumers of gas (50 percent and 25 percent respectively), other South American countries are a lot less dependent.

== Nationalization of natural gas industry ==
On May 1, 2006, president Evo Morales signed a decree stating that all gas reserves were to be nationalized: "the state recovers ownership, possession and total and absolute control" of hydrocarbons. He thus fulfilled his electoral promises, declaring that "We are not a government of mere promises: we follow through on what we propose and what the people demand". The announcement was timed to coincide with Labor Day on May 1. Ordering the military and engineers of YPFB, the state firm, to occupy and secure energy installations, he gave foreign companies a six-month "transition period" to re-negotiate contracts, or face expulsion. Nevertheless, president Morales stated that the nationalization would not take the form of expropriations or confiscations. Vice President Álvaro García Linera said in La Paz's main plaza that the government's energy-related revenue will jump to $780 million next year, expanding nearly sixfold from 2002. Among the 53 installations affected by the measure are those of Brazil's Petrobras, one of Bolivia's largest investors, which controls 14% of the country's gas reserves. Brazil's Energy Minister, Silas Rondeau, reacted by considering the move as "unfriendly" and contrary to previous understandings between his country and Bolivia. Petrobras, Spain's Repsol YPF, UK gas and oil producer BG Group Plc and France's Total are the main gas companies present in the country. According to Reuters, "Bolivia's actions echo what Venezuelan President Hugo Chávez, a Morales ally, did in the world's fifth-largest oil exporter with forced contract migrations and retroactive tax hikes — conditions that oil majors largely agreed to accept." YPFB would pay foreign companies for their services, offering about 50 percent of the value of production, although the decree indicated that companies at the country's two largest gas fields would get just 18 percent.

Negotiations between the Bolivian government and the foreign companies intensified during the week leading up to the deadline of Saturday October 28, 2006. On Friday an agreement was reached with two of the companies (including Total) and by the deadline on Saturday the rest of the ten companies (including Petrobras and Repsol YPF) operating in Bolivia had also come to an agreement. Full details of the new contracts have not been released, but the objective of raising government share of revenues from the two major fields from 60 percent to 82 percent seems to have been achieved. Revenue share for the government from minor fields is set at 60 percent.

During the six month negotiation period talks with the Brazilian company Petrobras had proven especially difficult. Petrobras had refused raises or reduction to a mere service provider. As a result of stalled talks Bolivian energy minister Andres Soliz Rada resigned in October and was replaced by Carlos Villegas. "We are obligated to live with Brazil in a marriage without divorce, because we both need each other", said Evo Morales in the contract signing ceremony underlining the mutual dependency of Brazil on Bolivian gas and of Bolivia on Petrobras in gas production.

=== Reaction ===
On December 15, 2007, the regions of Santa Cruz, Tarija, Beni, and Pando declared autonomy from the central government. They also moved to achieve full independence from Bolivia's new constitution.

== The protesters ==
=== Miners ===
Miners from the Bolivian trade union Central Obrera Boliviana (COB) have also been very active in the recent protests. Recently they have been active against propositions to privatize pensions. They have been known for letting off very loud explosions of dynamite in the recent protests.

=== Coca farmers ===
Shortly after the law passed, Evo Morales, an Aymara Indigenous, cocalero, and leader of the opposition party Movement Towards Socialism (MAS), took a moderate position calling the new law "middle ground". However, as the protests progressed, Morales has come out in favor of nationalization and new elections.

=== Protesters in Cochabamba ===
Oscar Olivera was a prominent leader in the 2001 protests in Cochabamba against the privatization of water in Bolivia and has also become a leading figure. Specifically the protesters in Cochabamba, Bolivia's fourth largest city, have cut off the main roads in the city and are calling for a new Constituent Assembly as well as nationalization.

=== Indigenous and peasant groups in Santa Cruz ===
Indigenous people in the eastern lowland department of Santa Cruz have also become active in the recent disputes over nationalization of the gas and oil industry. They are composed of indigenous groups such as the Guaraní, Ayoreo, Chiquitano and the Guyarayos, as opposed to the highland Indigenous people (Aymara and Quechua). They have been active in recent land disputes and the main organization representing this faction is known as the "Confederacion de pueblos indigenas de Bolivia" (CIDOB). The CIDOB after initially offering support to MAS, the party of Bolivia's new president, have come to believe that they were deceived by the Bolivian government. The MAS, which is based in the highlands, is no more willing to grant them voice than the previous governments whose power was also based from the highlands. Another smaller more radical group called the "Landless Peasant Movement" (MST) which is somewhat similar to the Landless Workers' Movement in Brazil, and is composed mainly of immigrants from the western part of the country. Recently, Guaraní people from this group have taken oil fields run by Spain's Repsol YPF and the United Kingdom's BP and have forced them to stop production.

=== Felipe Quispe and peasant farmers ===
Felipe Quispe was an Aymara leader who wished to return control of the country from what he saw as the "white elite" to the indigenous people who make up the majority of the country's population. Therefore, he was in favor of an independent "Aymaran state". Quispe is the leader of the Pachakutik Indigenous Movement, that won six seats in the Congress and the secretary general of the United Peasants Union of Bolivia in the 2002 Bolivian elections.

== See also ==
- Cochabamba anti-privatization protests
- Geology of Bolivia
- Bolivian gas referendum, 2004
