= Vatukoula mine strike =

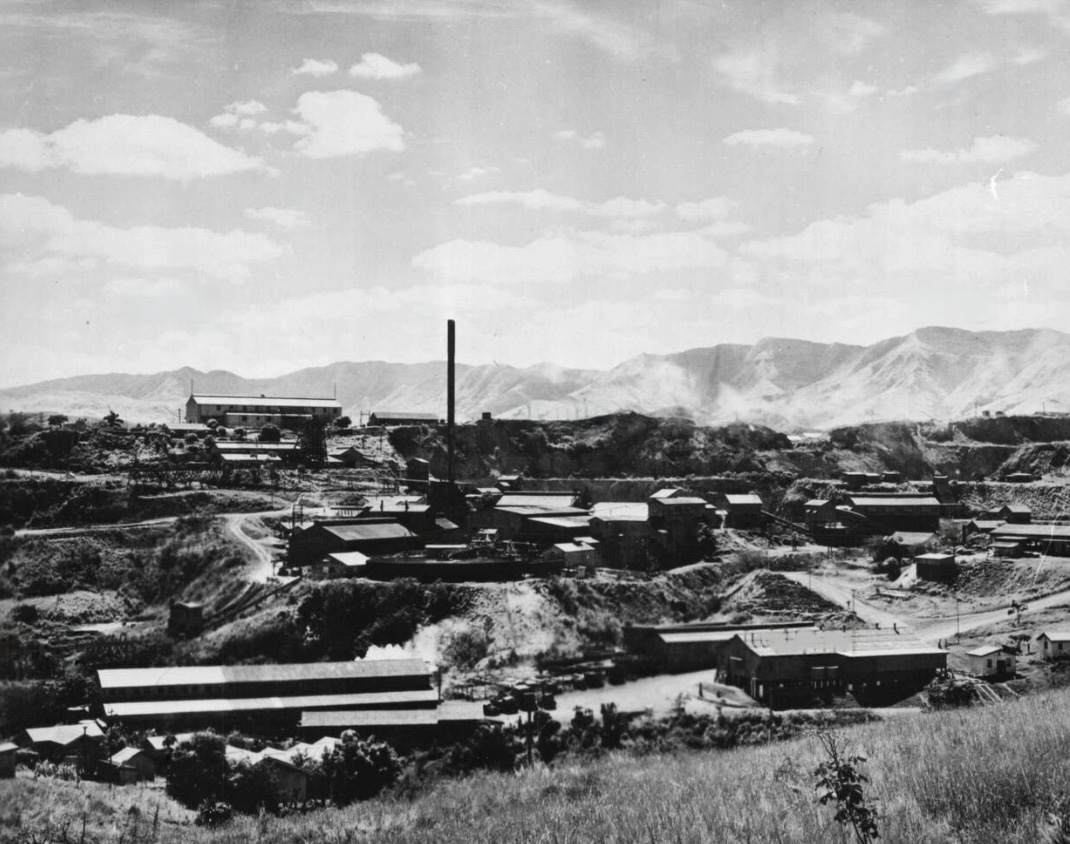
- The Vatukoula mine in 1951.
- Date: 27 February 1991 – 4 July 2024
- Location: Vatukoula mine, Fiji
- Goals: Improved working and housing conditions; An end to workplace racial discrimination; Improved wages; Recognition of the Fiji Mine Workers Union
- Methods: Strike action, picketing
- Result: Government compensation to the strikers; Official government apology to the strikers

Parties
Vatukoula miners Fiji Mine Workers Union	Emperor Gold Mining; Government of Fiji (February 1991-May 1992)	Government of Fiji (May 1992-onwards)

The Vatukoula mine strike was a 33-year strike by miners at the Vatukoula mine in Fiji, from 1991 to 2024. The strike was the longest in Fijian history and one of the longest strikes in world history.

== Background ==
The Vatukoula mine is a gold mine on the Viti Levu island of Fiji. Owned by Emperor Gold Mining, a mining company that began operations in Australia before shifting its listing to the Isle of Man in the 1980s, the mine was opened in 1934 and is one of the largest gold mines on Earth. Emperor Gold has faced significant criticisms over its ownership of the mine throughout the decades, with critics alleging that the company has hidden the true profits it makes from the mine while receiving large amounts of government support (including tax breaks and subsidies), that wages have been consistently low, as well as that workplace conditions have remained structured on colonial hierarchies and have consistently had low health and safety standards. According to Glen Finau of the University of Tasmania, "the town of Vatukoula grew out of the mine and attracted people from the 14 provinces of Fiji. The workforce consisted predominantly of the indigenous population and during that period the Emperor Gold mine was Fiji’s largest private sector employer... this gave Emperor Gold mine significant bargaining power in its negotiation with Government."

In 1975, the company was granted a specific exemption from the Employment Act 1965, making it the only company in the country authorised to make "work-related" deductions from employee wages. Following an industrial dispute at the mine in 1977, the Fijian government's Siwatibau Report noted issues of poor communication between workers and management, including a lack of local non-European senior management, an aloof attitude towards workers, and a focus on preventing union organising instead of optimising management techniques. A 1981 United Nations Economic and Social Commission for Asia and the Pacific report found that the company had sub-par environmental standards, with a subsequent 1984 report by Tavua District health inspectors finding high levels of bacterial contamination in the drinking water provided to workers at the mine. In 1984, Emperor Gold and the Fijian government signed the Vatukoula Tax Agreement (VTA), expanding the tax breaks given to the mine (effectively expempting the mine from income tax) with the aim of increasing the development of the mine's most profitable shaft.

== History ==
=== Strike ===
On 27 February 1991, 900 workers at the Vatukoula mine walked off the job, launching strike action against the mine's owner, Emperor Gold Mining, over poor working and social conditions. Among the complaints were that the housing for the miners was substandard and overcrowded, that the work safety conditions were poor (including the company pressuring workers to work while ill, refusing to pay compensation for serious workplace injuries, staffing below minimal safe levels, and a lack of proper ventilation), that workers were given no input into shift scheduling, as well as that the cost of uniforms and tools they were provided was deducted from their salaries and that they were forced to buy their food from the company-owned supermarkets, leaving many of the miners with substantial debts. Complaints also included allegations of "apartheid-like" discrimination, with the European workers in the mine making significantly more money and being housed separately and in better conditions than the Fijian and Indian workers. Adding to the complaints was that Emperor Gold had refused to recognize the Fiji Mine Workers Union. As well, women working at the mine complained of a gender pay gap, that the company did not provide safe transportation for women workers for shifts late at night, and that the company did not offer any housing at all to women workers.

Emperor Gold claimed that the complaints were unfounded, saying that it offered wages comparable to other industries in Fiji and that working conditions could not be as bad as described, as the company claimed to have a long waiting list of applicants for open positions. Emperor Gold also claimed that the striking workers were illegally squatting around 20% of company houses and that it did not force workers to live in company-provided housing. The company claimed that the sole reason for the strike was that the workers wanted to force the company into recognising the Fiji Mine Workers Union, despite only a minority of the workers supporting the union.

The Fijian government supported Emperor Gold in the strike, and deployed sixty armed riot police to try and break up picket lines; this led to clashes between the striking miners and the police. In early April 1991, Emperor Gold announced that it would fire half of the striking miners, and attempted to force the miners to accept the letters of dismissal.

As the strike continued into May, Emperor Gold began to face difficulties, with the picket lines effectively blocking any gold from being exported since mid-April. In early May 1991, there was also a significant fire, causing hundreds of thousands of dollars' worth of damage to the mine. The company blamed the fire on the miners. Later that month, two dozen striking miners were arrested for picketing and sentenced to six months suspended sentences. The arrested miners alleged that that company had hired thugs to beat them up after their arrests.

In June 1991, the Fijian government issued an anti-strike decree to try and force the miners back to work. However, the union pledged to continue the strike. According to Steve Painter of Green Left, by November 1991, "The strike has been a bitter affair, with militant picketing, attacks by hired thugs on mineworkers' residential districts, attempts to evict mineworkers' families from their homes, police attacks on picket lines, and at one point a refusal by the local supermarket to sell goods to strikers. The police are fed and supplied on a company account at the same supermarket. The workers have held out thanks to donations of cash and produce from other Fijian unions and from farmers and the public throughout the islands. At one point the government attempted to ban collections in support of the mineworkers. Australian unions and the ACTU have also provided some assistance."

On 4 February 1992, a move by the Fijian authorities to hand eviction notices to striking miners sparked a riot. During the riot, sheriff Mani Lal was killed, seemingly after a stone thrown by one of the striking miners struck his head. One striking miner was arrested and charged with the murder, however, was subsequently acquitted in court.

=== 1992 elections and shift in the government's position ===
Following the 1992 Fijian general election in May 1992, the first to be held since the 1987 Fijian coups d'état and the abolition of the monarchy, the government now led by Sitiveni Rabuka began to shift its position, in large part to avoid the opposition Fiji Labour Party (and outspoken Labour figures such as Atu Emberson Bain, who covered the history of labour relations at the mine for her PhD thesis and subsequent book Labour and Gold in Fiji, published in 1995) from capitalising on the strike. According to Brij V. Lal of the Australian National University, Rabuka "distanced himself from the interim administration's policies to create a niche for himself as a moderate consensus builder," notably by criticising the interim administration's industrial policies.

The government withdrew some of the deployed police and began to put pressure on the company to recognise the union. On 24 August 1992, Minister of Labour Militoni Leweniqila publicly criticised Emperor Gold, saying that "the unethical exploitation of the Fiji labour market should not be happening in this day and age" and accusing the company of "liaising and directly communicating with top government people who they hope will throw a spanner into the works to avoid the successful recognition of the union." Emperor Gold responded to Leweniqila by threatening to end investments into the mine, claiming a "current scenario of lawlessness and an unsupportive minister of labour."

By September 1992, the government had ordered the company to negotiate with the union. The negotiations, however, failed to produce any results and the strike continued.

=== Continuing strike and inquiries ===
In July 1993, the Fijian government agreed that it would hold an inquiry into the still-ongoing strike, subsequently launching the inquiry in April 1994. The government stated that it was "fully conscious that the problems at Vatukoula will invariably continue to surface from time to time in one form or another unless there is a comprehensive review by Government of the Vatukoula operation and its future." The GP Lala Commission of Inquiry Report into the events surrounding the Vatukoula Trade Dispute C36/H/20, was completed in 1995. In 2004, however, following appeals by Emperor Gold, the Lala Commission was declared null and void by the Fijian courts. The courts found that the commission had deviated from its terms of reference and had failed to give Emperor Gold the opportunity to properly respond to some of the commission's recommendations.

In November 2003, anti-poverty NGO Oxfam conducted an investigation into the strike, at the request of the union. In its report, released in 2004, Oxfam wrote that "over 300 people still periodically sit on a picket line outside the mine and complain of hardships endured by their families because they refuse to return to work until their grievances are addressed," adding that "current employees alleged that low pay and poor working conditions persist at Vatukoula and that they still consider health, safety and environmental standards to be inadequate even though the situation has improved since 1991." In its report, Oxfam also noted the effects the strike was having on the strikers, including loss of wages, being forced to take precarious seasonal work to feed their families, increased incidents of alcoholism, the break down of marriages, increased domestic violence, and a feeling of abandoment by the government. These effects also extended to the children of the strikers: "[the strike h]as been hard on them individually and hard on their families, with school fees often going unpaid and their children not being adequately fed or clothed. This was confirmed in interviews with the workers from some of the local schools – they described how they could distinguish the children of strikers from other children due to their poor health, lack of food, and lack of shoes and proper uniforms."

In February 2010, as the strike entered its 19th year, the union appealed to the International Labour Organization and the United Nations Human Rights Council to intervene. Later that year, the IndustriALL Global Union issued a statement calling for the government to negotiate with the miners. In May 2010, the government and the union held a number of new negotiations to try and reach a deal to end the strike. The first meetings of the negotiations were described by the union as productive. As the negotiations continued, however, the sides failed to finalize a deal, and the strike continued.

By March 2014, as the strike began its 23rd year, eighty-one of the original striking miners had died. Of the miners that continued to strike, several continued to hold seasonal jobs working in sugar cane fields under an agreement with the National Farmers Union. That year, Lila Wati, the widow of sheriff Mani Lal, told the Fiji Times that she had yet to receive compensation from the government for her husband's death. Another round of negotiations was attempted in 2015, but failed to produce any results.

The strike continued through the late 2010s. Fiji Trades Union Congress national secretary Felix Anthony stated in 2018 that the country "should be ashamed" that the strike was ongoing, while highlighting ongoing safety issues at the mine.

=== Resolution ===
The People's Alliance led by Sitiveni Rabuka won the 2022 Fijian general election, with Rabuka returning to the office of Prime Minister of Fiji as head of a coalition government for the first time since 1999. Under Rabuka's coalition, Minister of Industrial Relations (and former Fiji Teachers Union leader) Agni Deo Singh re-launched negotiations, pledging to finally resolve the strike.

In June 2024, after more than 33 years, an agreement was reached to end the strike. Included in the agreement was a $9.2 million settlement to be paid to the surviving striking miners. Rabuka also issued a formal apology in 2024 to the miners on behalf of the Fijian government "for the prolonged wait they have endured," saying that the miners "have shown us the true meaning of strength and determination, and [their] fight for justice is an inspiration to us all."

At that time, around half of the original striking miners had died. One miner, whose parents had been among the strikers and had begun work at the mine as a child, told the Fiji Times that "when it was announced during the budget, I went to my room and could not hold the pain I had to go through. I thought of our fathers who were miners who have passed on and those who are still around. And my mother has also passed on. I kept thinking of her on Friday... Sometimes when I would leave home, I would bid farewell to my family before going to the mine. But my mother would not say bye. She would say ‘you are going to come back home alive’. That's what we should see of the difficulties our fathers had to go through. And was followed by their children who also worked in the mine. But their lives were just taken lightly."

According to Avinesh Gopal of the FTUC, the strike continued "mainly because of the lack of commitment by successive governments that came and went," crediting Rabuka's coalition for putting in the effort to ensure negotiations succeeded. Some politicians, however, criticised the agreement, such as Jone Usamate, who stated that "I am sure it will come in very handy for the gold miners and their families. There is a danger, however, sir, that others will use this as a precedent for future unresolved industrial disputes."

The first round of payments to the miners and their families occurred in October 2024, with a ten thousand dollar payment to 360 people, totalling 3,6 million dollars. Sadreu stated on the occasion that "we finally made it." The second and final round of payments was completed in August 2025, with fifteen thousand dollars being given to each individual. Between the two rounds, a further eight of the original strikers passed away.
