= Nursery nurses strike =

2003 strikes in Scotland

In 2003, nursery nurses employed by local authorities in Scotland began a rolling programme of strike action in response to councils' refusals to countenance their demands for pay increases.

In March 2004, the nursery nurses embarked on an indefinite strike action, gradually a number of councils settled with the strikers, meeting their demands in full and by the seventh week of the strike seven local councils had settled, before UNISON called off its demand for a national settlement. The last council to settle was Glasgow City Council in June 2004 after 14 weeks of strike action, accepting a final offer of £9.83ph in contrast to the £10.13 won by the strikers in 16 of the other 32 local authorities.
