= Tatasi River =

Coordinates: 21°10′S 66°08′W

Tatasi
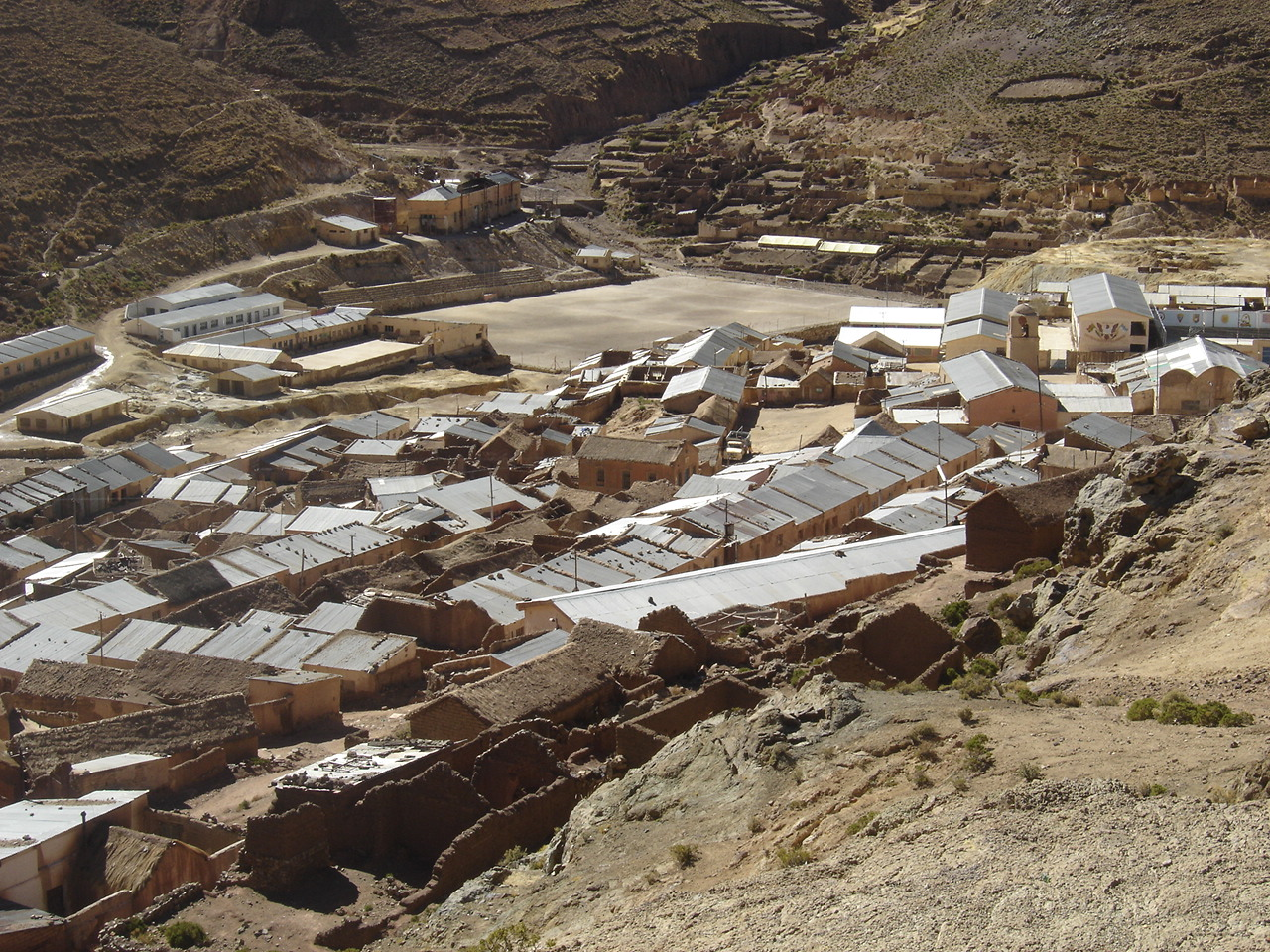
- The village Tatasi and Tatasi River

Location
- Country: Bolivia
- Region: Potosí Department
- Municipality: Sud Chichas Province

Physical characteristics
- Mouth: Tupiza River
  - location: Tupiza Municipality

The Tatasi River is a Bolivian river in the Potosí Department, Sud Chichas Province, Atocha Municipality and Tupiza Municipality. It is a left tributary of the Tupiza River and belongs to the river basin of the upper Pillku Mayu.

== Description ==
The Tatasi River is a left tributary of Tupiza River and belongs to the river basin of the upper Pillku Mayu. It runs parallel to the nearby Alexandrabetha river, which both join into the Tupiza River. It flows from the village Tatasi until joining the Tupiza River near Oro Ingenio, northwest of Tupiza. Its direction is mainly southeast.

The river flows from the village Tatasi until joining the Tupiza River near Oro Ingenio, northwest of Tupiza. Its direction is mainly southeast.

== Contamination ==
In 2003, traces of lead were discovered in schoolchildren who lived in the nearby village and had dranken from the water. This was believed to be caused by the nearby Tatasi-Portugalete Mine, which was mining for silver and lead. Because of this, COMNIBOL (Bolivia's state mining corporation) and the Danish environmental cooperation program (PCDSMA) invested $654,000 into fixing the canals and waterways in the area to make it safer. The mining and hydrocarbons minister, Jorge Berindoague, officially opened the project in late 2003. The project was designed to make the water safe within five years.

== Area climate ==
Tatasi River

Climate chart (precipitation, max. and min. temperature)
J	F	M	A	M	J	J	A	S	O	N	D
152 26 6	91 26 4	26 25 5	10 25 6	16 20 1	18 17 −1	6 16 −2	4 21 0	2 27 3	16 34 6	9 36 7	42 33 5
- █ Average max. and min. temperatures in °C
- █ Precipitation totals in mm
Imperial conversion
J	F	M	A	M	J	J	A	S	O	N	D
6 79 43	3.6 79 39	1 77 41	0.4 77 43	0.6 68 34	0.7 63 30	0.2 61 28	0.2 70 32	0.1 81 37	0.6 93 43	0.4 97 45	1.7 91 41
- █ Average max. and min. temperatures in °F
- █ Precipitation totals in inches

== See also ==
- List of rivers of Bolivia
