= Tatasi-Portugalete Mine =

Coordinates: 21°10′S 66°08′W

- Mine
- Interactive map of Tatasi-Portugalete Mine
- Country: Bolivia
- Department: Potosí Department
- Province: Sud Chichas Province
- Municipality: Atocha Municipality
- Canton: Portugalete Canton
- Elevation: 13,337 ft (4,065 m)
- Time zone: UTC-4 (BST)

The Tatasi-Portugalete Mine is a lead mine located in Tatasi, Bolivia in the Potosí Department. The mine operations consist of underground workings, with one known shaft. The shaft depth reaches 600 meters (1,969 feet). The nearby Cordillera Oriental of the Andes characterize the geomorphology of the surrounding area and surround the mine.

== History ==
The mine was started by Spanish colonists in the 1500s to mine for lead and gold until 1873. It fell into disrepair, and was later used by the Corporacion Minera De Bolivia (Comibol) mining colony beginning in 1973 with an increased priority on lead, silver and zinc. The company later expanded their mining operations to include numerous other ores.

=== 1800s mining colony ===
The nearby mining colony located outside of Tatasi was used in the 1800s, until being abandoned by the workers when the project closed. It housed many workers plus the natives enlisted to help the mine and even contained a Roman Catholic church. The colony was unsafe, with frequent accidents. Despite this, miners enjoyed working there and were satisfied with their work.

The miners frequently engaged in feasts and festivals to celebrate harvests throughout the summer, with one miner recalling in his journal:

"Thursday, July 31/84 ... This evening they had a grand procession of candles and other fixings and putting off of fireworks. They were headed by a boy carrying a drum on his back and another beating it. Then they brot [sic] out an image of our Saviour in a grand frame and decorated off in splendid style and took it to church. On the tower they had several large candles lit which illuminated the place. They are still beating the drum and putting off powder balls..."

Friday, August 1/84 ... In the evening they lit several large fires in the Plaza and several large ornamental lanterns up in front of the church. Lots of music and dancing, if music it may be called, a drum and some kind of string instrument and some wood whistles...

Saturday, Aug 2/84 ... There was a grand display. The saints were brogt [sic] out of the church and fixd [sic] on stands made on purpose and trimmed with white muslin. Then the Priest came along and burned incense in front of them with all the people kneeling on the ground. It was a feast for the prosperity of the mines. They had one altar erected in front of the tunnel. All that did not bow in front of the altar were counted heathens."

These festivals were often religious in origin, but the inhabitants of the colony were not often religious, instead preferring to live freely. These festivities, plus the day off given each Sunday for the Sabbath, motivated the miners to continue working.

The mining colony was also partially responsible for the growth of football in the region, with their frequent contacts to other areas.

When the mine was reopened in 1973 by COMNIBOL, the village was not used and was instead kept as a historical artifact.

== Materials ==
The mine was used to extract a number of precious minerals and ores. They were then classified based on the importance to the project by the company.

Materials Extracted
Commodity	Type	Importance
Lead	Metallic	Primary
Silver	Metallic	Primary
Zinc	Metallic	Primary
Gold	Metallic	Secondary
Antimony	Metallic	Tertiary
Bismuth	Metallic	Tertiary
Copper	Metallic	Tertiary
Tin	Metallic	Tertiary

Andorite is also present in the region, but was not mined.

== Contamination ==
In 2003, traces of lead were discovered in schoolchildren who lived in the nearby village and had dranken from the Tatasi River, which runs by the mine. This was believed to be caused by the mine, which at the time was mining for silver and lead. Because of this, COMNIBOL (Bolivia's state mining corporation) and the Danish environmental cooperation program (PCDSMA) invested $654,000 into fixing the canals and waterways in the area to make it safer. The mining and hydrocarbons minister, Jorge Berindoague, officially opened the project, which was designed to make the water safe within five years.

== Area Climate ==
Tatasi-Portugalete Mine

Climate chart (precipitation, max. and min. temperature)
J	F	M	A	M	J	J	A	S	O	N	D
152 26 6	91 26 4	26 25 5	10 25 6	16 20 1	18 17 −1	6 16 −2	4 21 0	2 27 3	16 34 6	9 36 7	42 33 5
- █ Average max. and min. temperatures in °C
- █ Precipitation totals in mm
Imperial conversion
J	F	M	A	M	J	J	A	S	O	N	D
6 79 43	3.6 79 39	1 77 41	0.4 77 43	0.6 68 34	0.7 63 30	0.2 61 28	0.2 70 32	0.1 81 37	0.6 93 43	0.4 97 45	1.7 91 41
- █ Average max. and min. temperatures in °F
- █ Precipitation totals in inches
