= Atocha =

Atocha may refer to:

== Places ==
- Atocha (Madrid), a central ward (barrio) of Madrid, Spain, in the Arganzuela District
- Atocha (Salta), a municipality in Salta Province, Argentina
- Atocha, Bolivia, a town in the Atocha Municipality in Bolivia
- Atocha, Ecuador, a parish in Ambato, Ecuador
- Atocha Municipality, a municipality of Sud Chichas Province, Potosí Department, Bolivia

== Literature and poetry ==
- "Leaving the Atocha Station", 1962 poem by John Ashbery
- Leaving the Atocha Station, 2014 novel by Ben Lerner

== Ships ==
- Nuestra Señora de Atocha, a Spanish galleon that sank in 1622
- Spanish frigate Villa de Madrid, a 19th-century Spanish Navy screw frigate that also bore the devotional name Nuestra Señora de Atocha

== Structures ==
- Atocha, former name of Estación del Arte (Madrid Metro), a station on the Madrid Metro
- Atotxa Stadium, a football stadium in San Sebastián, Spain
- Basilica of Nuestra Señora de Atocha, a church in Madrid, Spain
- Madrid Atocha railway station, a central railway station of Madrid, Spain
- Paseo Atocha, a historic commercial street turned promenade in Ponce, Puerto Rico
- Puerta de Atocha (city gate), a former gate in the city walls of Madrid, Spain
- Our Lady of Atoċja Chapel in Hamrun, Malta

== Other ==
- Esparto, also known as atocha, a perennial grass in northwest Africa and the southern part of the Iberian Peninsula
- Holy Infant of Atocha, a representation of Jesus venerated by Hispanic Catholics in Spain, Latin America, and the southwestern United States
