= Tatasi =

Coordinates: 21°10′S 66°08′W

- Town
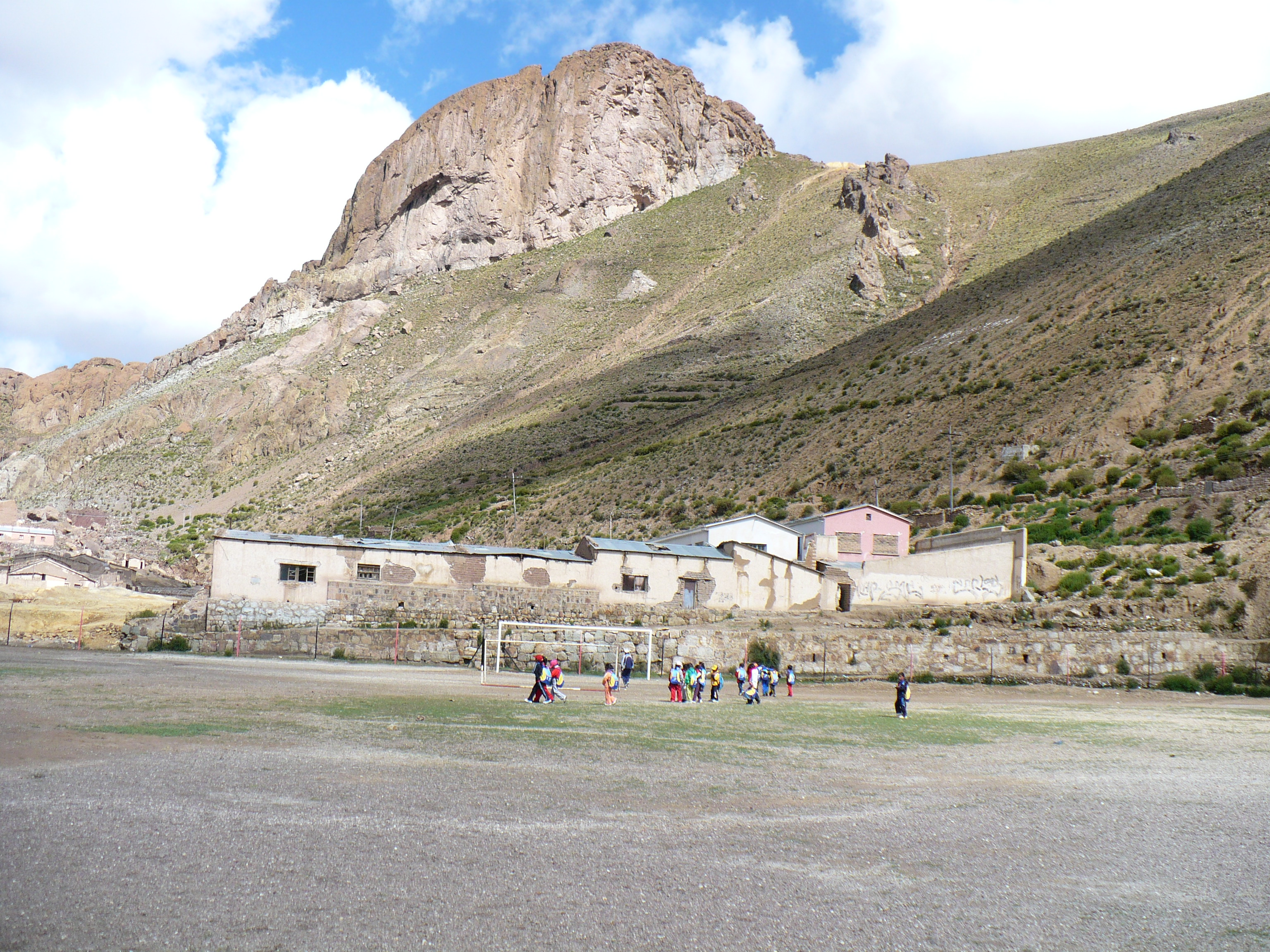
- Tatasi
- Interactive map of Tatasi
- Country: Bolivia
- Department: Potosí Department
- Province: Sud Chichas Province
- Municipality: Atocha Municipality
- Canton: Portugalete Canton
- Elevation: 13,337 ft (4,065 m)

Population (2001)
  - Total: 674
- Time zone: UTC-4 (BST)

Tatasi is a small town in Bolivia in the Potosí Department, in Sud Chichas Province, Atocha Municipality. It is situated at the Tatasi River and located at the foothills of the Cordillera de Lípez.

== Location ==
Tatasi is the most populous settlement in the canton of Portugalete and lies in the district (Bolivian : Municipio) Atocha in the province of Sur Chichas. The village is located at an altitude of 4065m in a high mountain depression on the irregularly flowing Río Tatasi, one of the source rivers of the Río Tupiza. Tatasi is framed by ridges that rise to an altitude of 4,460 meters, surrounding the town almost entirely. Almost three kilometers west of Tatasi is the uninhabited ghost village of Portugalete and the mining colony at the Tatasi-Portugalete Mine, which were abandoned in the 19th century after the silver mines there were exhausted and the mining colonies there moved on.

== Geography ==
Tatasi is located on the Bolivian Altiplano, in the northern foothills of the Cordillera de Lípez. The climate of the region is arid and has a clear time of day, in which the average daily temperature fluctuations are stronger than the temperature fluctuations over the course of the year.

The terrain around Tatasi is mainly hilly, but to the northeast it is flat. Tatasi is located on a hill. The highest point in the vicinity is 4471 meters above sea level, 1.1 km south of Tatasi. Around Tatasi it is very sparsely populated, with 5 inhabitants per square kilometer.

The surroundings around Tatasi are mainly an open bush landscape.

The Tatasi River and Alexandrabetha River both run southeast through the town until joining the Tupiza River.

== Transportation ==
Tatasi is located 340 kilometers south of Potosí, the capital of the department of the same name.

From Potosí, the truck road Ruta 5 leads in a southwesterly direction 208 kilometers to Uyuni, from there it travels for another 96 kilometers to Atocha. From Atocha, a country road leads southeast along the old railway line for 23 kilometers to Escoriani, and then leaves the railway line in a southwesterly direction, where it reaches Tatasi after thirteen kilometers. From there it continues via San Vicente to the neighboring provincial capital of San Pablo de Lípez.

== Population ==
The population of the village has almost halved in the last decade of the 20th century, but has increased slightly since the turn of the century.

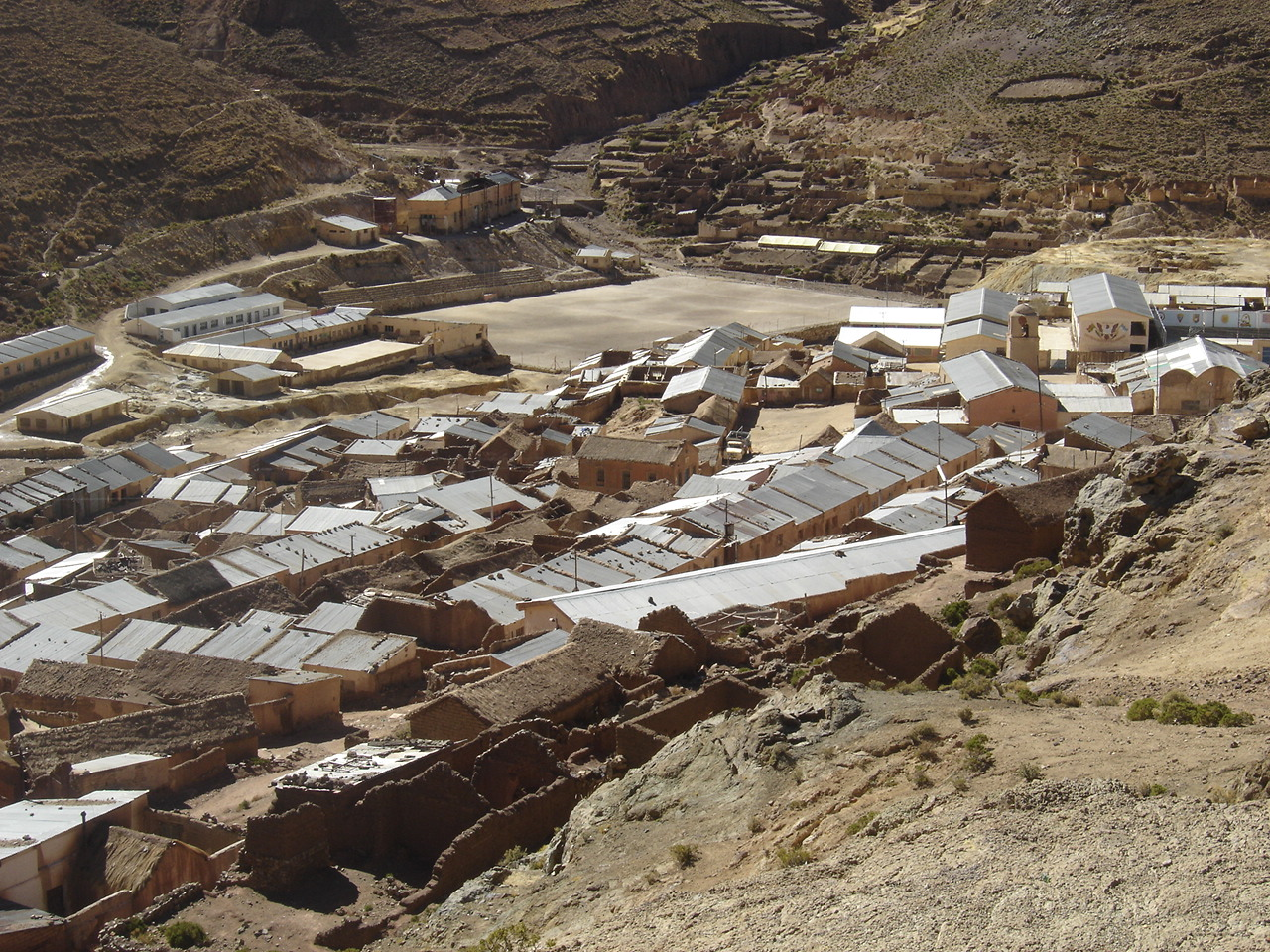
Tatasi's townscape

Year	Population	Source
1992	1,328	1992 Census
2001	674	2001 Census
2012	770	2012 Census

Due to the historically native-grown population distribution, the region has a high proportion of Quechua population. In the Municipio Atocha, 60.1 percent of the population speak the Quechua language.

There are about 5 people per square kilometer in the area.

== Climate ==
There is a cold desert climate in the area.

The region's mean annual temperature is around 6 °C, with a monthly average of almost 2 °C in the summer, and 8 to 9 °C from November to March. The annual rainfall is a low 200 mm, with the months of April to October being almost free of precipitation. Significant rainfall occurs only from November to March, with a maximum of about 50 mm monthly precipitation in January.

Tatasi

Climate chart (precipitation, max. and min. temperature)
J	F	M	A	M	J	J	A	S	O	N	D
152 26 6	91 26 4	26 25 5	10 25 6	16 20 1	18 17 −1	6 16 −2	4 21 0	2 27 3	16 34 6	9 36 7	42 33 5
- █ Average max. and min. temperatures in °C
- █ Precipitation totals in mm
Imperial conversion
J	F	M	A	M	J	J	A	S	O	N	D
6 79 43	3.6 79 39	1 77 41	0.4 77 43	0.6 68 34	0.7 63 30	0.2 61 28	0.2 70 32	0.1 81 37	0.6 93 43	0.4 97 45	1.7 91 41
- █ Average max. and min. temperatures in °F
- █ Precipitation totals in inches
