= Talina (Tupiza) =

- Town
- Location within Bolivia
- Coordinates: 21°45′S 65°50′W
- Country: Bolivia
- Department: Potosí Department
- Province: Sud Chichas Province
- Municipality: Tupiza Municipality
- Elevation: 10,174 ft (3,101 m)

Population (2012)
  - Total: 119
- Time zone: UTC-4 (BOT)
- Postal code: 05-0801-0400-3005

Talina is a location in the Potosí Department in Bolivia. In 2012 it had an estimated population of 119.

== Climate ==
Climate data for Talina (San José Pampa Grande), elevation 3,000 m (9,800 ft)
Month	Jan	Feb	Mar	Apr	May	Jun	Jul	Aug	Sep	Oct	Nov	Dec	Year
Mean daily maximum °C (°F)	26.1 (79.0)	26.1 (79.0)	27.0 (80.6)	26.3 (79.3)	24.8 (76.6)	22.8 (73.0)	22.6 (72.7)	23.8 (74.8)	24.8 (76.6)	26.3 (79.3)	27.5 (81.5)	27.2 (81.0)	25.4 (77.8)
Daily mean °C (°F)	17.8 (64.0)	17.2 (63.0)	17.2 (63.0)	16.2 (61.2)	13.7 (56.7)	11.8 (53.2)	12.2 (54.0)	13.4 (56.1)	14.9 (58.8)	17.4 (63.3)	18.3 (64.9)	18.5 (65.3)	15.7 (60.3)
Mean daily minimum °C (°F)	9.7 (49.5)	8.5 (47.3)	8.1 (46.6)	6.9 (44.4)	3.9 (39.0)	1.8 (35.2)	1.9 (35.4)	2.8 (37.0)	5.4 (41.7)	8.1 (46.6)	8.9 (48.0)	9.8 (49.6)	6.3 (43.4)
Average precipitation mm (inches)	83.2 (3.28)	60.3 (2.37)	33.9 (1.33)	3.9 (0.15)	1.0 (0.04)	0.0 (0.0)	0.0 (0.0)	0.2 (0.01)	0.9 (0.04)	3.5 (0.14)	14.6 (0.57)	64.4 (2.54)	265.9 (10.47)
Average precipitation days	9.3	7.3	4.7	0.6	0.2	0.0	0.0	0.1	0.3	0.6	2.6	7.2	32.9
Average relative humidity (%)	57.3	62.0	52.4	48.7	50.1	49.4	55.6	54.2	60.5	57.2	56.5	59.7	55.3
Source: Servicio Nacional de Meteorología e Hidrología de Bolivia
