= Atocha Canton =

- Canton
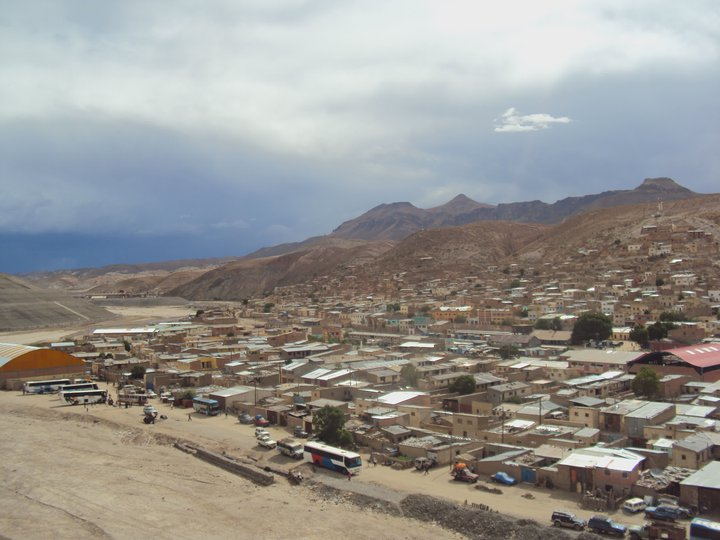
- Atocha

- Location of Atocha within Bolivia
- Coordinates: 20°56′0″S 66°13′0″W
- Country: Bolivia
- Department: Potosí Department
- Province: Sud Chichas Province
- Municipality: Atocha Municipality
- Seat: Atocha
- Elevation: 11,995 ft (3,656 m)

Population (2001)
  - Total: 3,127
  - Ethnicities: Quechua

Atocha Canton is one of the cantons of the Atocha Municipality, the second municipal section of the Sud Chichas Province in the Potosí Department in south-west Bolivia. Its seat is Atocha.

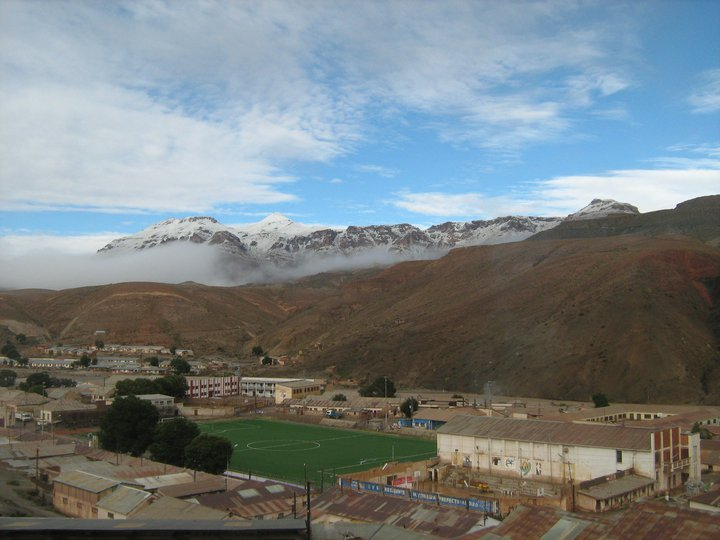
The village of Telamayu / T'ilamayu in Atocha Canton
