= San Vicente Canton =

San Vicente Canton may refer to:

- San Vicente Canton, Bolivia
- San Vicente Canton, Ecuador
