= Santa Bárbara, Potosí =

Coordinates: 20.9233°S 66.0494°W

Santa Bárbara (Potosí)
- Town
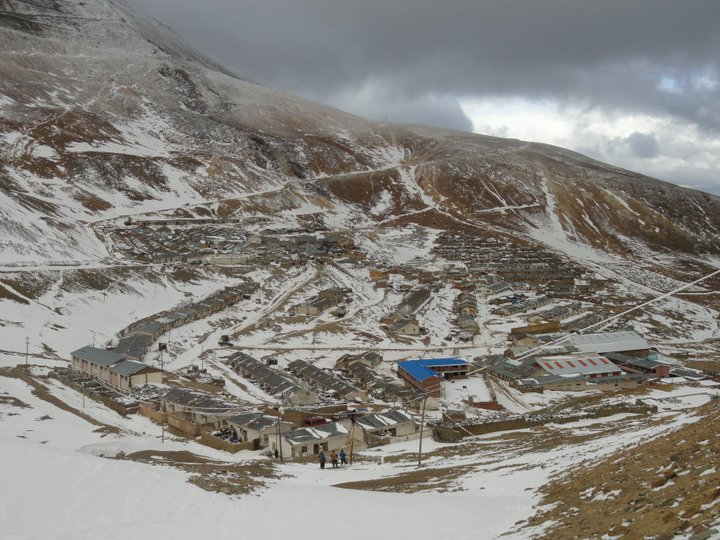
- Santa Bárbara
- Interactive map of Santa Bárbara (Potosí)
- Country: Bolivia
- Department: Potosí Department
- Province: Sud Chichas Province
- Municipality: Atocha Municipality

Population (2001)
  - Total: 2,505
- Time zone: UTC-4 (BST)

Santa Bárbara is a small town in the Potosí Department in Bolivia. It is located 4,800 metres (15,700 ft) above sea level, near the Cerro Chorolque, a mountain with a peak altitude of approximately 5,630 m (18,470 ft).

The mountain is rich in ore deposits of tin, bismuth, silver, gold and copper, and exploited by the mine "Chorolque" from different sides. It also was the highest permanent settlement of the Inca Empire.

== See also ==
- Chorolque
- Iskay Rumi
