= Kunturillu (disambiguation) =

Kunturillu (Quechua for "black and white", also spelled Condorillo) may refer to:

- Kunturillu (Arequipa), a mountain in the Arequipa Region, Peru
- Kunturillu (Ayacucho), a mountain in the Ayacucho Region, Peru
- Kunturillu (Bolivia), a mountain in Bolivia
- Kunturillu or Rocha River, a river in Bolivia
