= Chocaya Canton =

- Canton
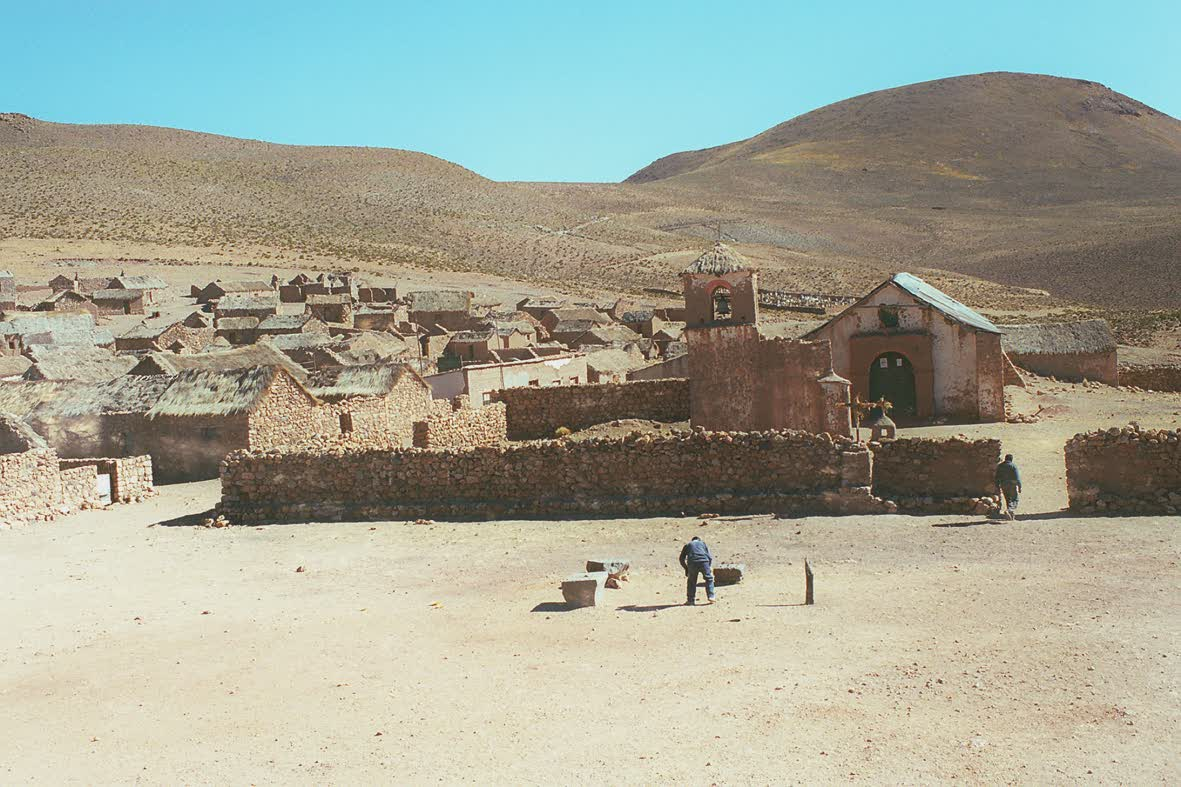
- Old Chocaya (Chocaya Viejo)

- Location of Chocaya Canton within Bolivia
- Coordinates: 20°59′0″S 66°20′0″W
- Country: Bolivia
- Department: Potosí Department
- Province: Sud Chichas Province
- Municipality: Atocha Municipality
- Seat: Chocaya
- Elevation: 13,800 ft (4,200 m)

Population (2001)
  - Total: 2,253
  - Ethnicities: Quechua

Chocaya Canton is one of the cantons of the Atocha Municipality, the second municipal section of the Sud Chichas Province in the Potosí Department in south-west Bolivia. Its seat is Chocaya.

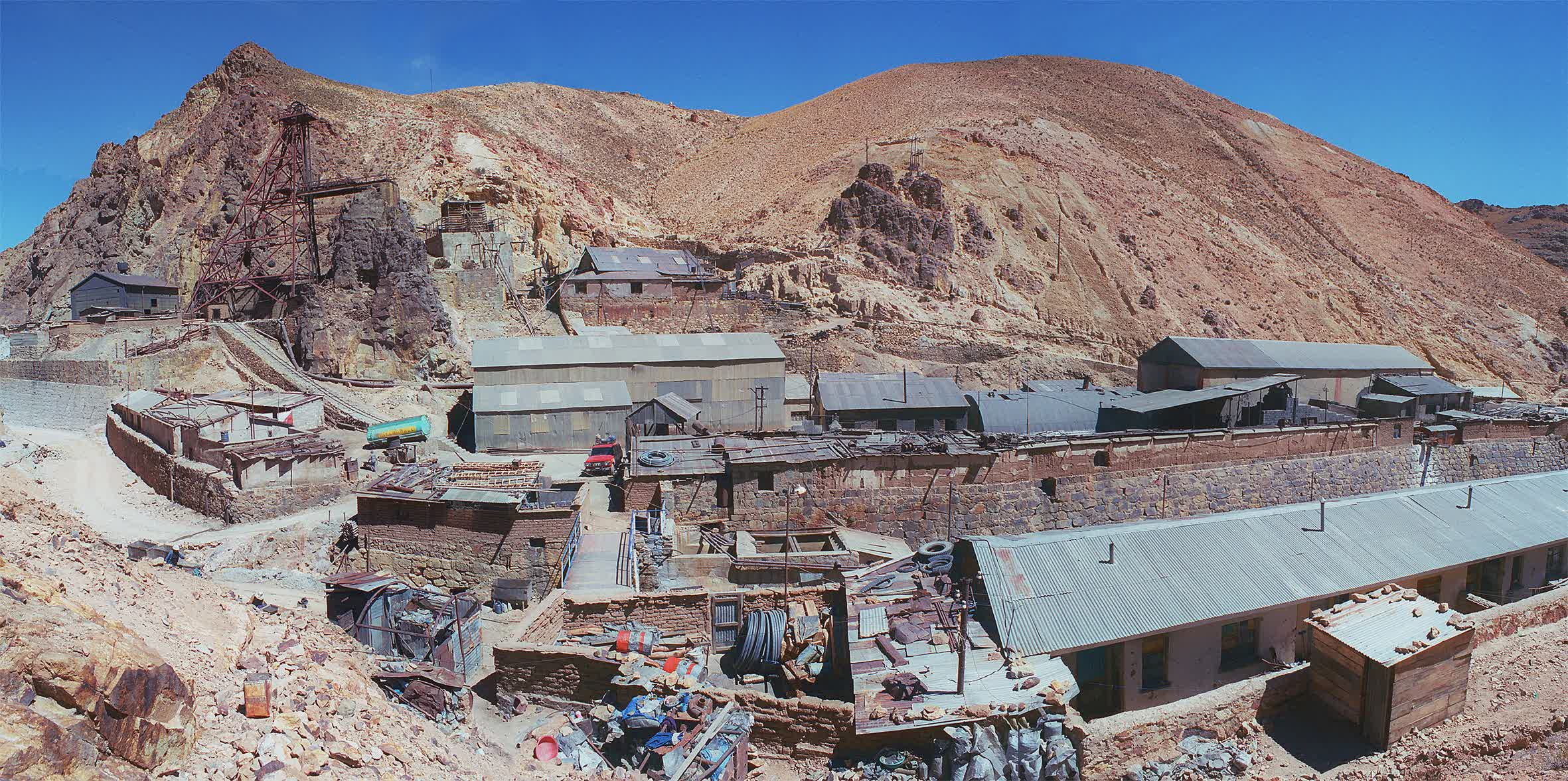
The village of Animas, Bolivia in Chocaya Canton

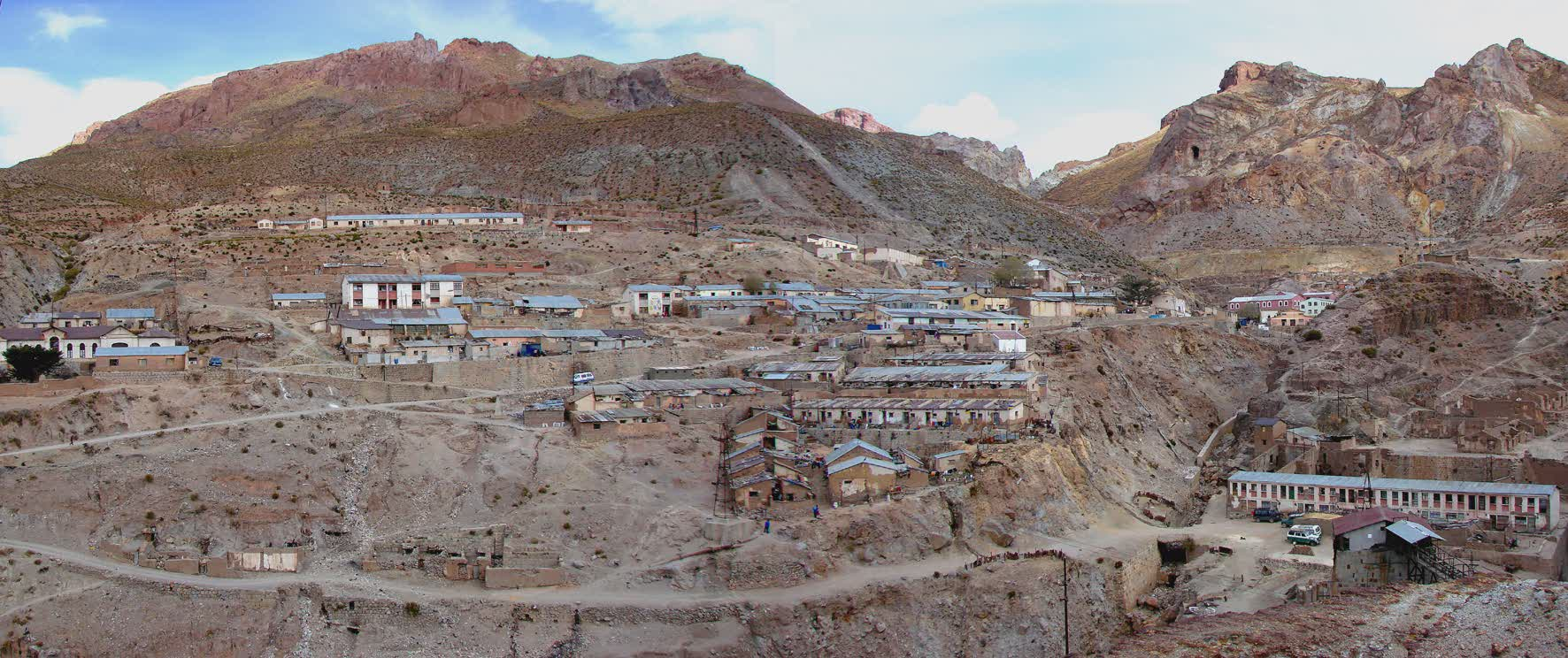
Siete Suyos mine, Chocaya Canton
