= Tupiza River =

Coordinates: 21.5192°S 65.6983°W

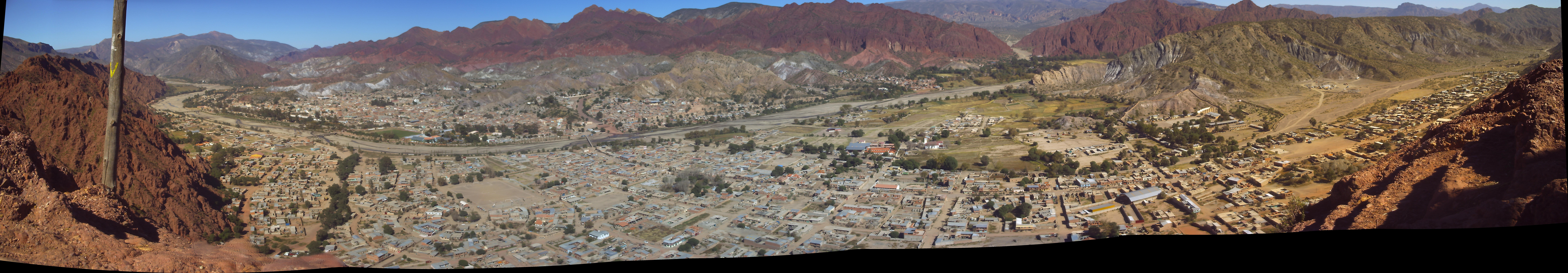
- Tupiza and Tupiza River

Location
- Country: Bolivia
- Region: Potosí Department, Sud Chichas Province

Basin features
- Tributaries
  - left: Tatasi River, Alexandrabetha River

The Tupiza River is a seasonal river located in Bolivia in the Potosí Department, in the Sud Chichas Province. The Tupiza River is a mainly seasonal river; it dries up during the dry season, and becomes full in the wet season. It flows for 28 miles southeast, towards Paraguay, before ending west of Tarija.

== River ==
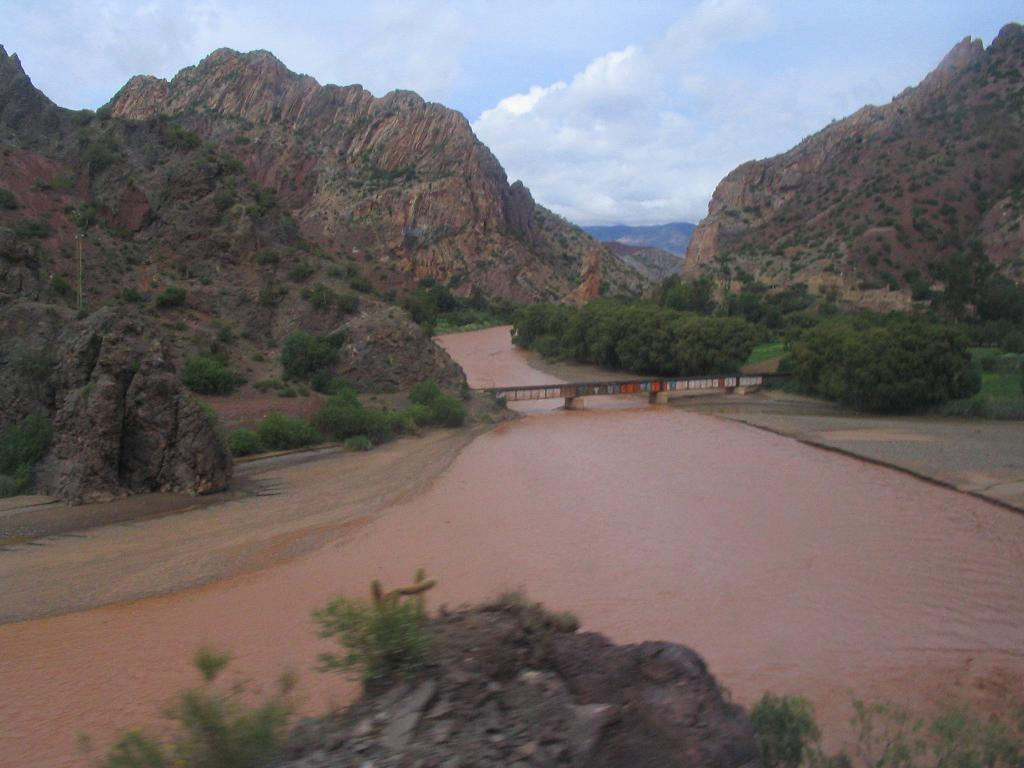
The river partially filled in the wet season

=== Path ===
The river forms at an altitude of 3327 meters at the confluence of the Río Chilco and the Río Tres Palcas. The river flows west for the first 20 kilometers, then turns south, crosses the city of Tupiza and flows into the Río San Juan del Oro, a tributary of the Río Pilcomayo, at an altitude of 2874m. It is not navigable.

It has two tributaries that flow into it near Tupiza, the Tatasi River and the Alexandrabetha River. Both join it on the westward side.

The river is used for irrigation for the nearby villages, with canals feeding plots of corn, potatoes, and onions.

=== Ending ===
The Tupiza river valley ends in a canyon now called "El Angosto", which is 120 meters long, 6 meters high and 5 meters wide. There are two tunnels, one for vehicles and another for rail, as well as a viewpoint overlooking the confluence of the San Juan Oro and Tupiza rivers.

== Flooding ==
In 2018, record rainfall in the area caused the river to overflow its banks and flood the local village. Much of the Tupiza watershed was ruined, with damage to buildings, livestock, and farms.

== Area Climate ==
Tupiza River

Climate chart (precipitation, max. and min. temperature)
J	F	M	A	M	J	J	A	S	O	N	D
169 28 11	129 26 7	40 26 8	13 26 9	17 22 5	12 17 4	3 18 1	3 23 7	3 30 7	20 35 9	24 37 10	53 33 8
- █ Average max. and min. temperatures in °C
- █ Precipitation totals in mm
Imperial conversion
J	F	M	A	M	J	J	A	S	O	N	D
6.7 82 52	5.1 79 45	1.6 79 46	0.5 79 48	0.7 72 41	0.5 63 39	0.1 64 34	0.1 73 45	0.1 86 45	0.8 95 48	0.9 99 50	2.1 91 46
- █ Average max. and min. temperatures in °F
- █ Precipitation totals in inches

== See also ==
- Tatasi River
- List of rivers of Bolivia
