= Chorolque =

Extinct volcano in Potosí Department, Bolivia

Choroloque
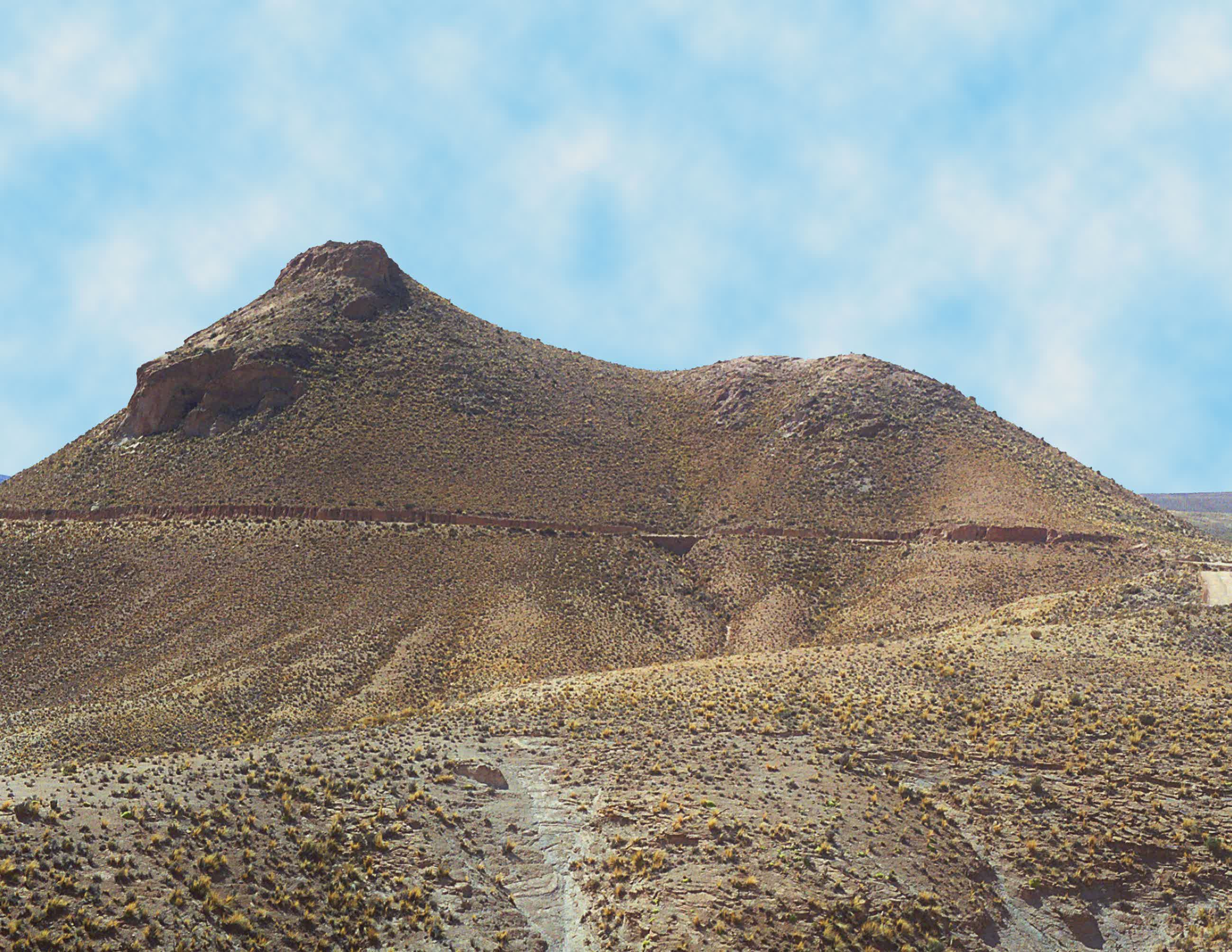
- Mount Chorolque

Highest point
- Elevation: 5,615 m (18,422 ft)
- Prominence
- Listing: Ultra
- Coordinates: 20°55′7″S 66°2′5″W

Geography
- Location within Bolivia
- Location: Potosí Department, Bolivia

Chorolque, also known as Cerro Chorolque, is an extinct volcano in the Potosí Department of southern Bolivia. The Santa Bárbara settlement is located at a height of 4,800 m (15,700 ft) on the side of the mountain.

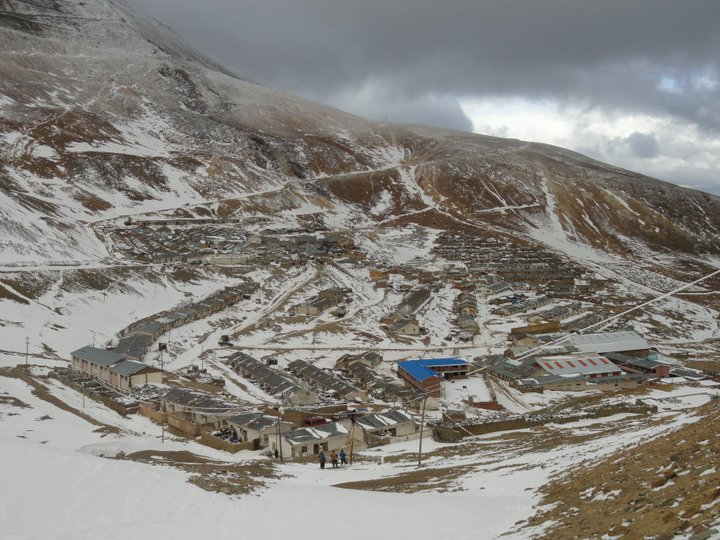
The mining town of Santa Bárbara

== Mining ==
Mining has led to drastic changes in the slope on all sides of the mountain. Miners have constructed a road up to 5,000 m (16,000 ft) of the mountain. The village of Santa Bárbara, with its 5000 inhabitants, is the highest village in Bolivia, and is located on the western slope of the mountain. The mines are the highest tin and bismuth mines in the world. Mining in the mountain began with the arrival of Western investors in 1889.

== Daughter of Chorolque ==
A 2007 film called Daughter of Chorolque, by Mi-Sun Park, details the lives of women working in the Chorolque mines. Most miners working in Chorolque do not live past 45, necessitating the need for women to also work in the mines, unlike in other parts of Bolivia where women are kept away from mines.
