= Bandera Roja (Tupiza) =

Bolivian newspaper

- Type: Irregular
- Founded: 1947
- Language: Spanish language
- Headquarters: Tupiza

Bandera Roja ('Red Flag') was a newspaper published from Tupiza, Bolivia. The newspaper appeared in 1947. The publication of the newspaper was irregular. Augusto Arroyo Z. was the director of Bandera Roja. It was printed at Imprenta "La Popular".
