= Portugalete Canton =

- Canton
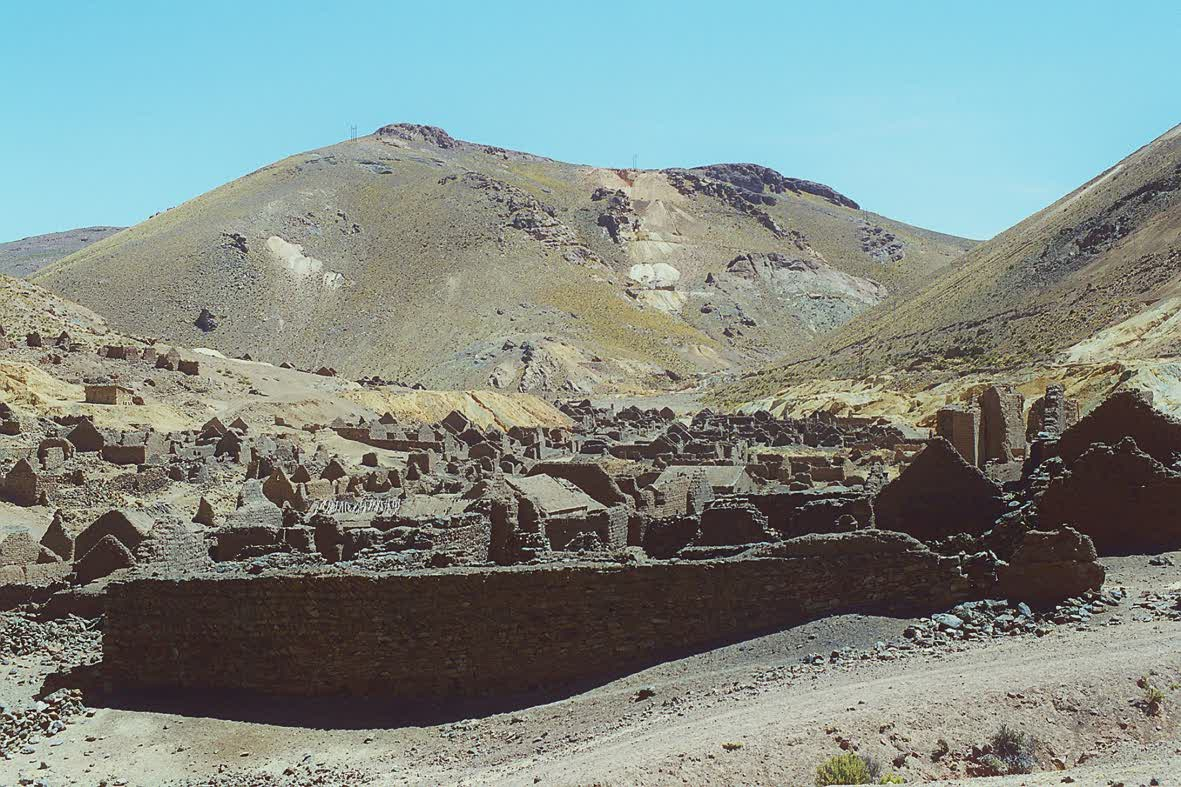
- Portugalete

- Location of 782 within Bolivia
- Coordinates: 21°10′0″S 66°10′0″W
- Country: Bolivia
- Department: Potosí Department
- Province: Sud Chichas Province
- Municipality: Atocha Municipality
- Seat: Portugalete
- Elevation: 13,800 ft (4,200 m)

Population (2001)
  - Total: 782
  - Ethnicities: Quechua

Portugalete Canton is one of the cantons of the Atocha Municipality, the second municipal section of the Sud Chichas Province in the Potosí Department in south-west Bolivia. Its seat is located at Portugalete.

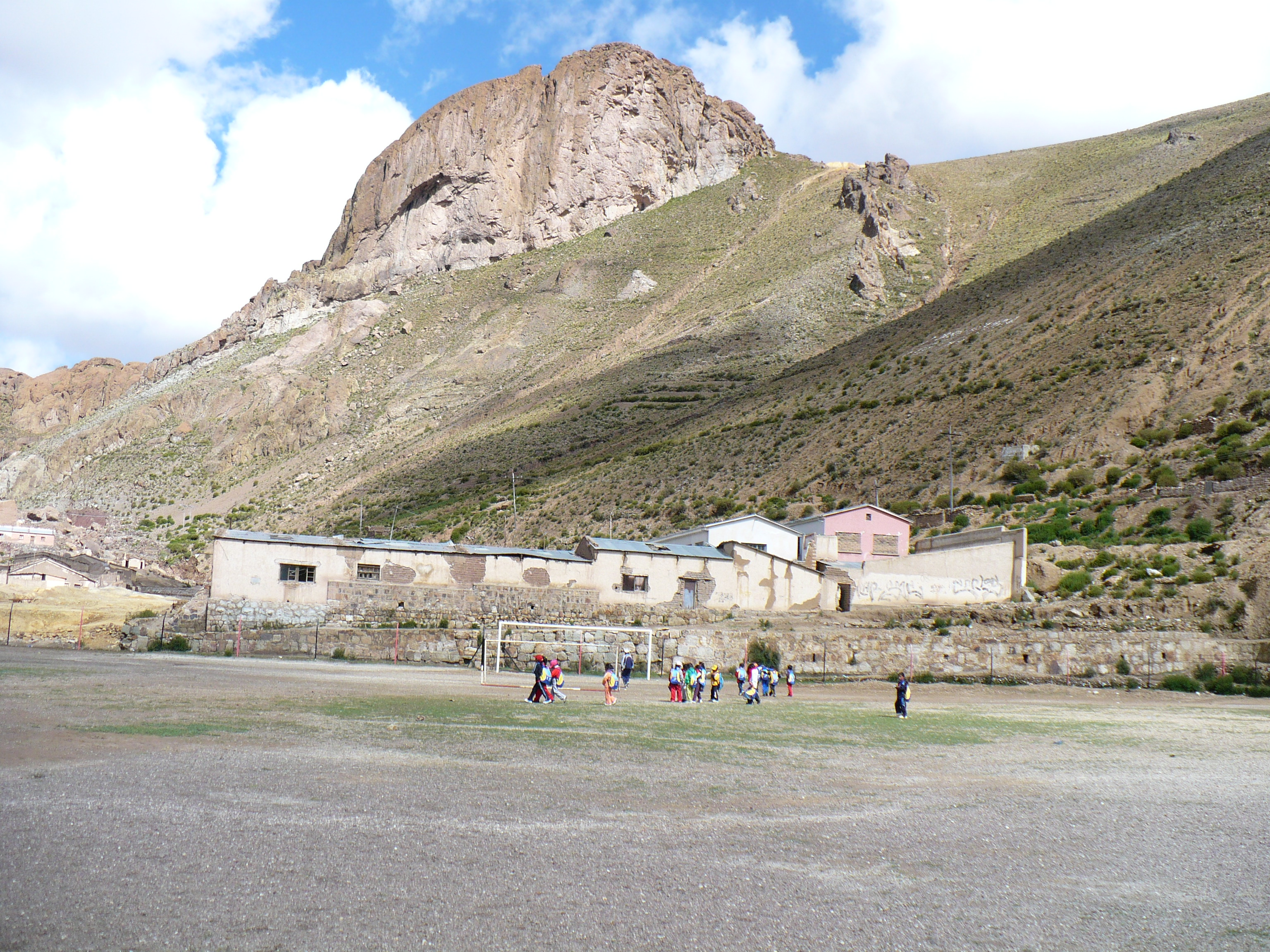
The village of Tatasi in Portugalete Canton

== Populated places ==
- Escoriani - 2 inhabitants (2001) (21° 6′ S, 66° 8′ W)
- Tatasi

== See also ==
- Atocha Municipality
