= Wila Qullu (Potosí) =

Mountain in Bolivia

- Location within Bolivia

Highest point
- Elevation: 4,140 m (13,580 ft)
- Coordinates: 20°58′29″S 66°22′51″W

Geography
- Location: Bolivia; Potosí Department
- Parent range: Andes

Wila Qullu (Aymara wila blood, blood-red, qullu mountain, "red mountain", also spelled Wila Kkollu) is a mountain in the Andes of Bolivia which reaches a height of approximately 4,140 m (13,580 ft). It is located in the Potosí Department, on the border of the Quijarro Province, Uyuni Municipality, and the Sud Chichas Province, Atocha Municipality. Wila Qullu lies at the Wila Wila river (Vila Vila) south of the village of Wila Wila.
