= Atocha, Salta =

Coordinates: 24°48′58″S 65°28′41″W

Atocha
- Municipality and village
- Interactive map of Atocha
- Country: Argentina
- Province: Salta Province
- Department: Capital Department, Salta
- Time zone: UTC−3 (ART)
- Climate: Cwb

Atocha is a village and rural municipality in Salta Province in northwestern Argentina.
