= Tupiza Municipality =

- Municipality
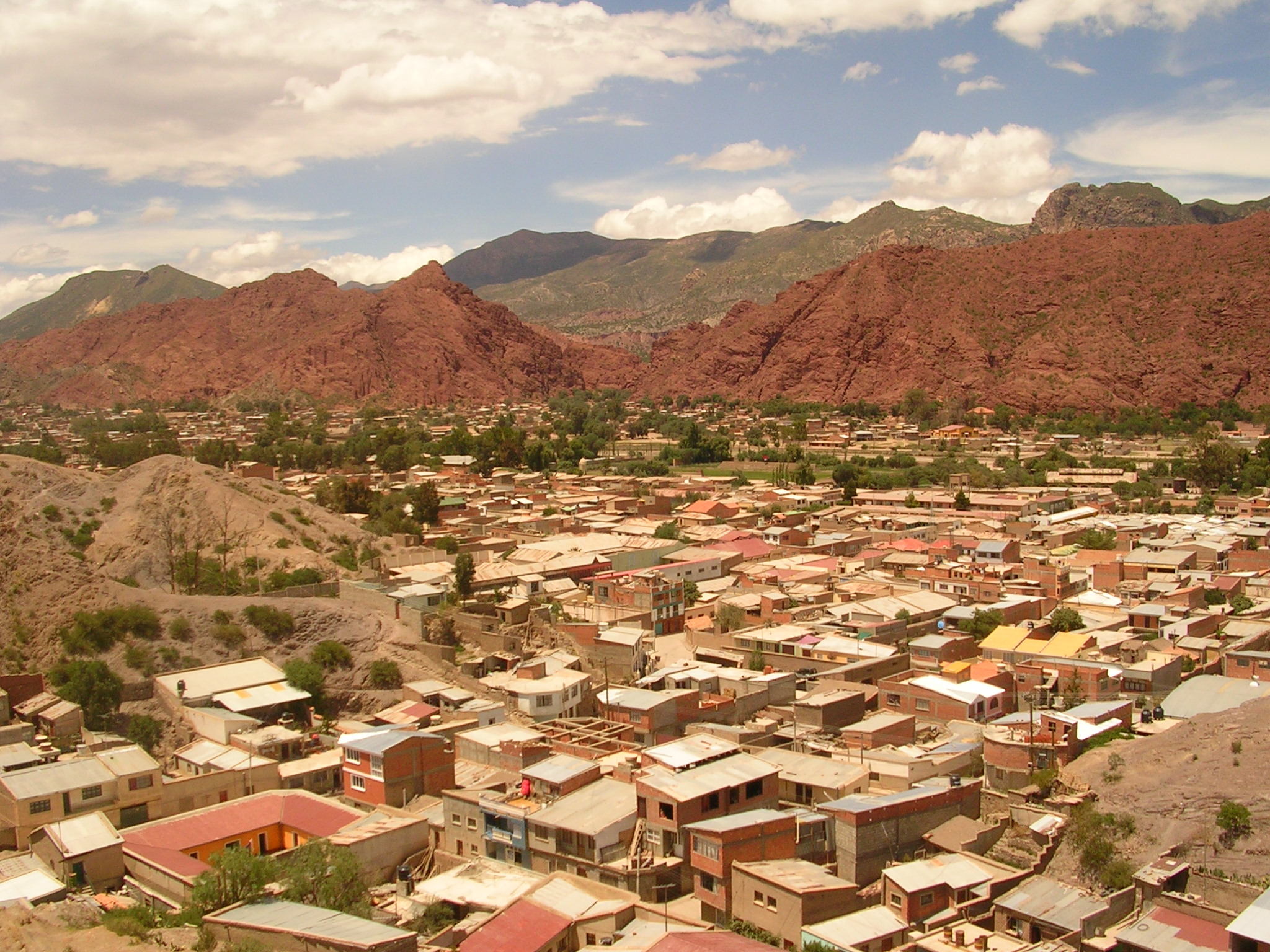
- Tupiza

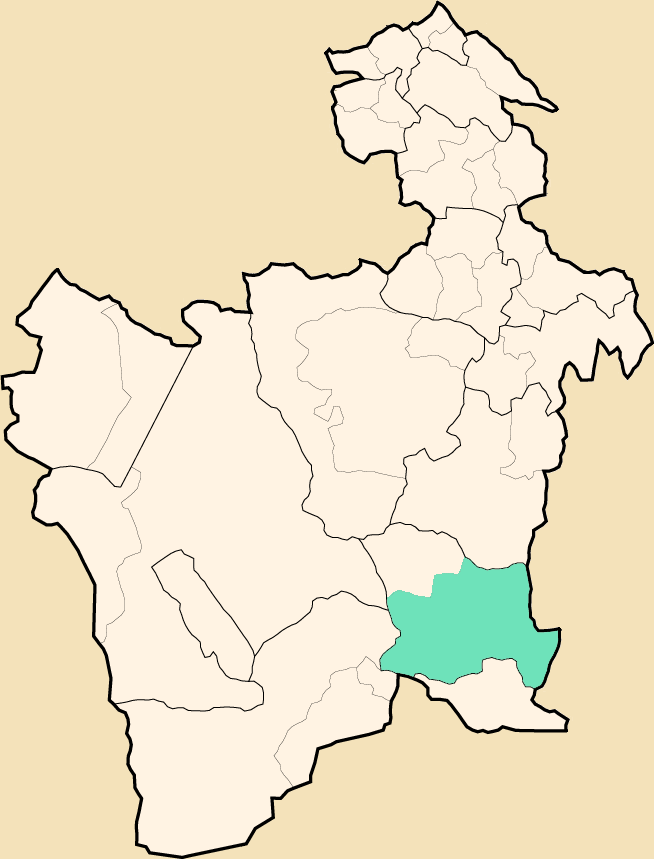
- Location within Potosí Department

- Location within Bolivia
- Coordinates: 21°27′S 65°52′W
- Country: Bolivia
- Department: Potosí Department
- Province: Sud Chichas Province
- Seat: Tupiza

Population (2001)
  - Total: 38,337
  - Ethnicities: Quechua
- Time zone: UTC-4 (BOT)

Tupiza Municipality is the first municipal section of the Sud Chichas Province in the Potosí Department in Bolivia. Its seat is Tupiza which is the capital of the province as well.

== Subdivision ==
The municipality consists of the following cantons:

- Chillco
- Concepcion
- Esmoraca
- Oploca
- Oro Ingenio
- Quiriza
- Rufino Carrasco
- Soracaya
- Suipacha
- Talina
- Tupiza
- Villa Pacheco

== The people ==
The people are predominantly indigenous citizens of Quechua descent.

Ethnic group	%
Quechua	57.0
Aymara	1.7
Guaraní, Chiquitos, Moxos	0.2
Not indigenous	38.5
Other indigenous groups	2.5
