= Kunturillu (Bolivia) =

Mountain in Bolivia

- Location within Bolivia

Highest point
- Elevation: 4,460 m (14,630 ft)
- Coordinates: 20°57′23″S 66°00′35″W

Geography
- Location: Bolivia; Potosí Department
- Parent range: Andes

Kunturillu (Quechua for "black and white", also spelled Condorillo) is a mountain in the Andes of Bolivia which reaches a height of approximately 4,460 m (14,630 ft). It is located in the Potosí Department, Sud Chichas Province, Atocha Municipality. Kunturillu lies east of the village of T'ula Mayu ("wood river", Thola Mayu). The T'uru Mayu ("mud river", Toromayu) originates east of the mountain. It flows to the south.
