= Atocha, Bolivia =

Atocha
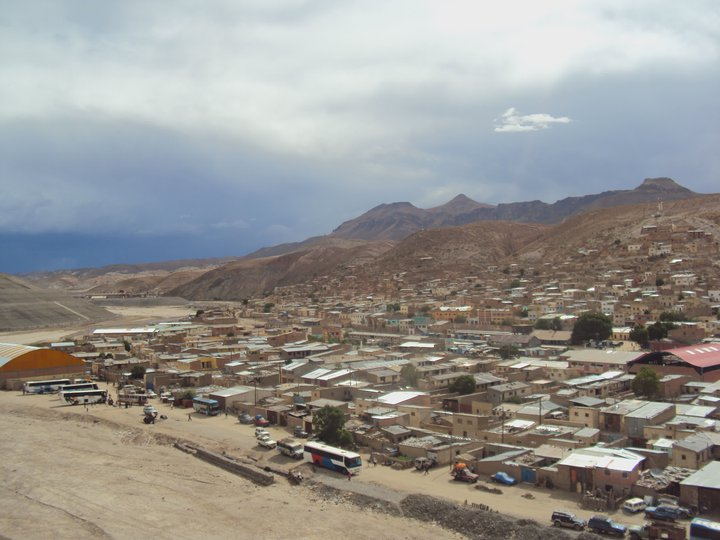

- Location in Bolivia
- Coordinates: 20°56′0″S 66°13′00″W
- Country: Bolivia
- Department: Potosí Department
- Province: Sud Chichas Province
- Municipality: Atocha Municipality
- Canton: Atocha Canton

Population (2001)
  - Total: 2,033
- Time zone: UTC-4 (BOT)

Atocha is a town in the Sud Chichas Province in the Potosí Department in Bolivia. It is the seat of the Atocha Municipality and Atocha Canton. In 2001 it had 2,033 inhabitants.
