= San Vicente Canton, Bolivia =

San Vicente
- Canton
- Location of San Vicente within Bolivia
- Coordinates: 21°16′0″S 66°19′0″W
- Country: Bolivia
- Department: Potosí Department
- Province: Sud Chichas Province
- Municipality: Atocha Municipality
- Seat: San Vicente
- Elevation: 14,770 ft (4,502 m)

Population (2001)
  - Total: 104
  - Ethnicities: Quechua

San Vicente Canton is one of the cantons of the Atocha Municipality, the second municipal section of the Sud Chichas Province in the Potosí Department in south-west Bolivia. During the census of 2001 it had 104 inhabitants. Its seat is San Vicente with a population of 50 in 2001.

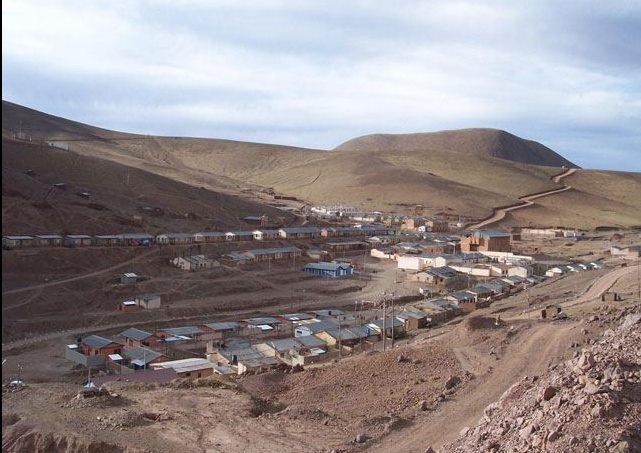
San Vicente.

== Butch Cassidy and the Sundance Kid ==
San Vicente claims to be the place where outlaws Butch Cassidy and the Sundance Kid were killed. The story goes that they robbed a mining company on November 4, 1908, and were recognized two days later in San Vicente where they took refuge in a house and engaged in a gunfight with three policemen and local authorities. Contrary to the final shootout scene in the movie Butch Cassidy and the Sundance Kid, one of the outlaws shot the other and then killed himself. However, a grave said to contain the remains of the Sundance Kid was exhumed and instead contained the body of Gustave Zimmer, a German.

San Vicente has a Butch and Sundance Museum and the local mining company offers tours.
