= Tupiza =

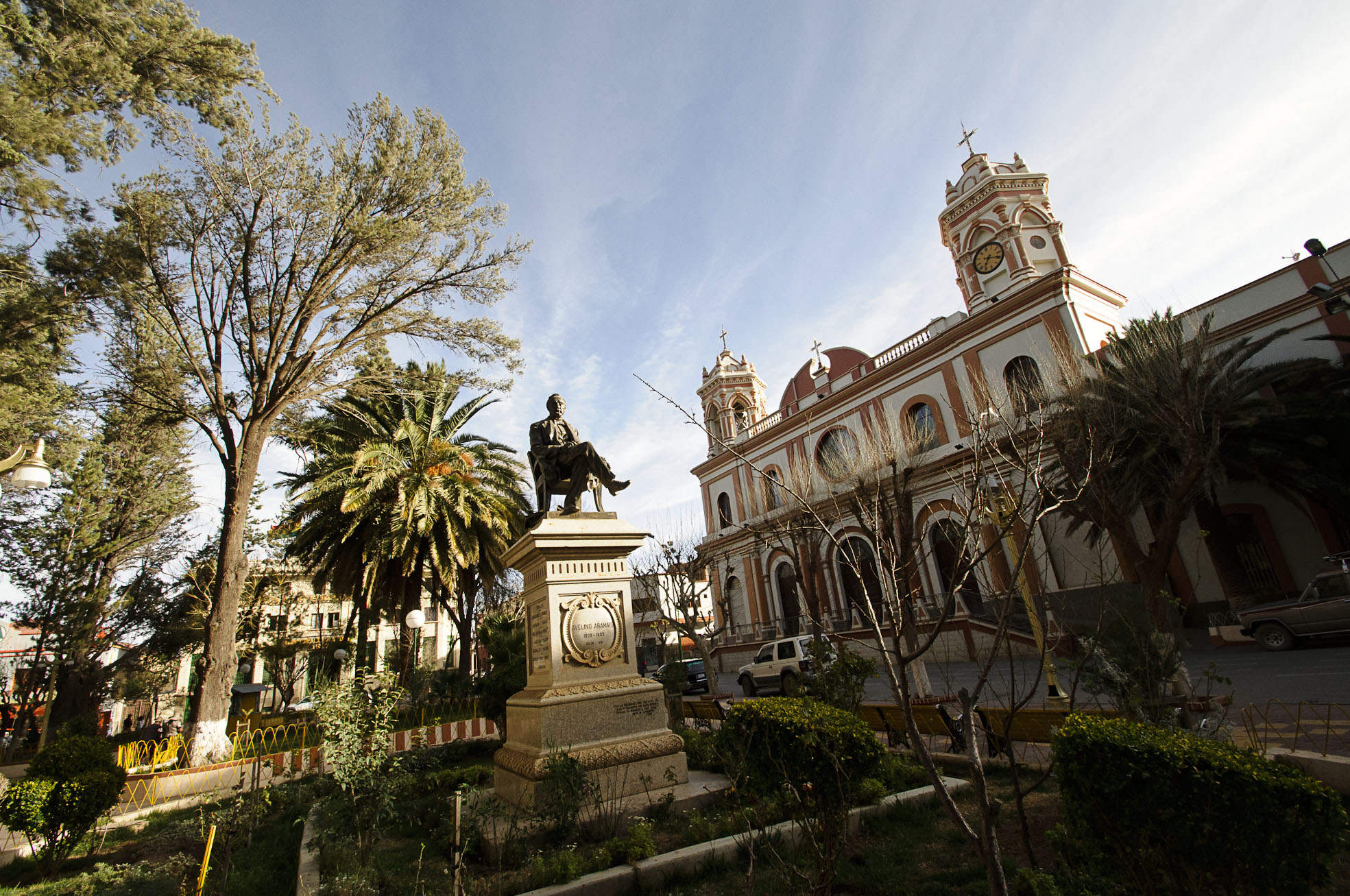
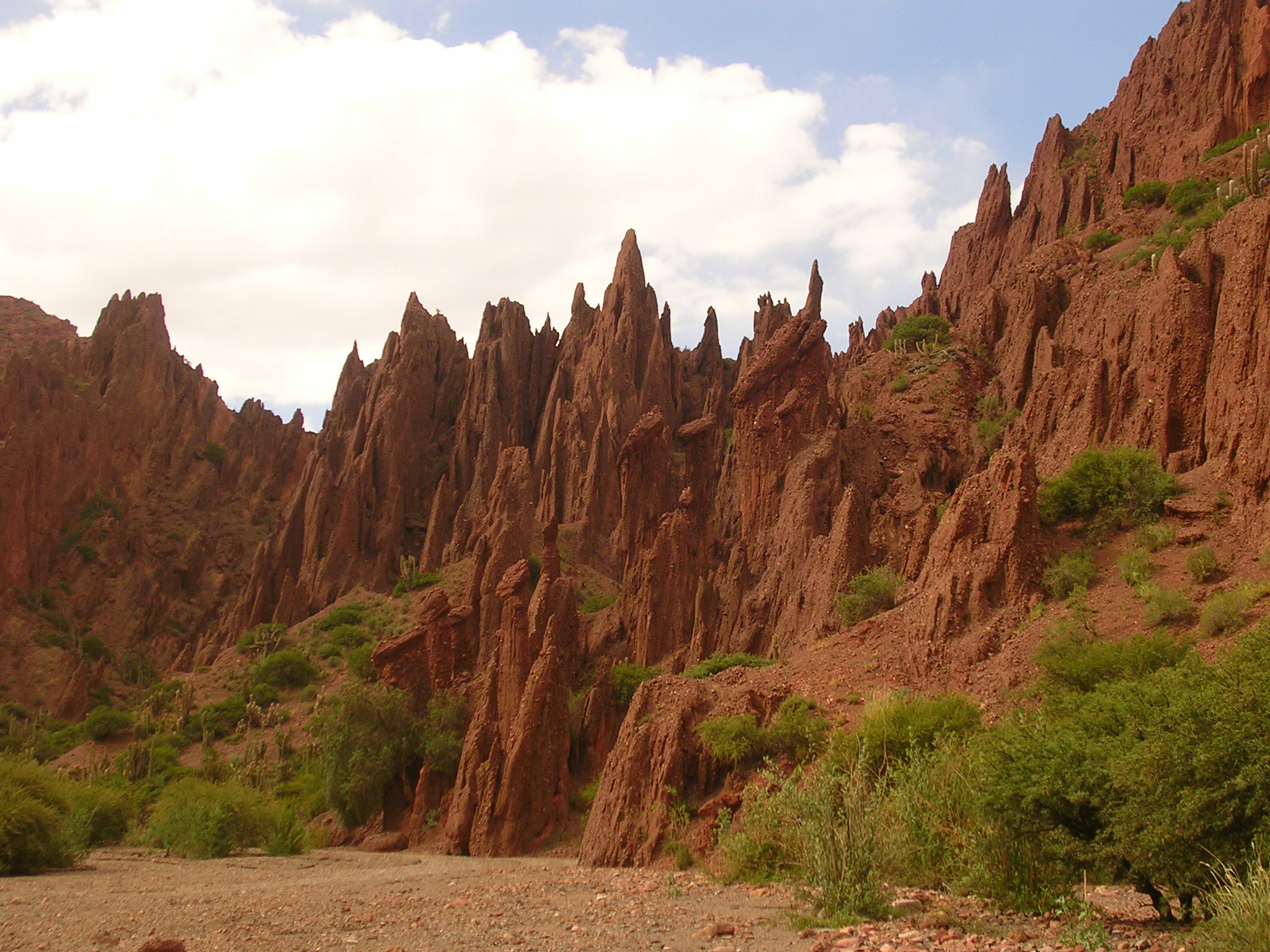
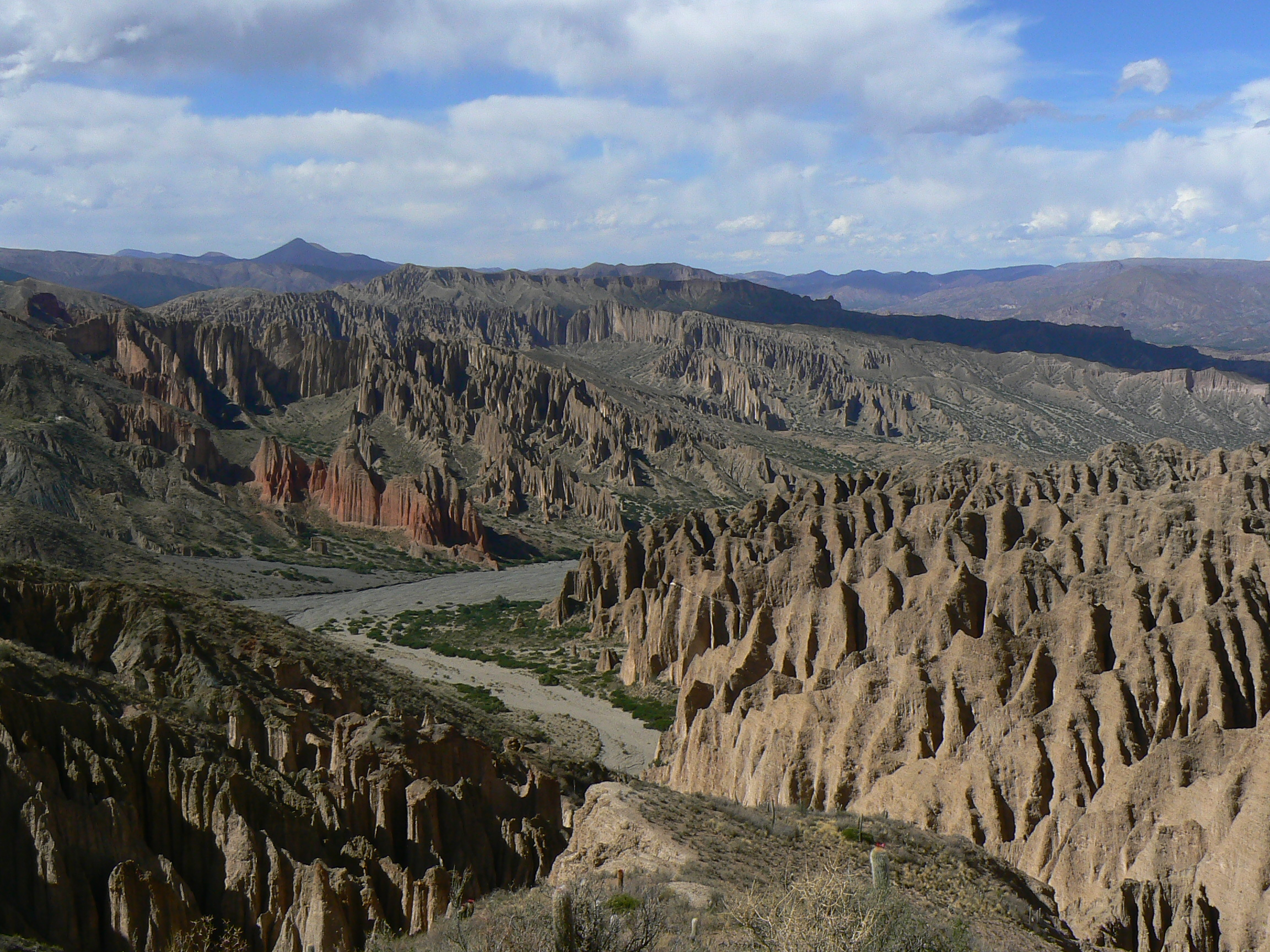
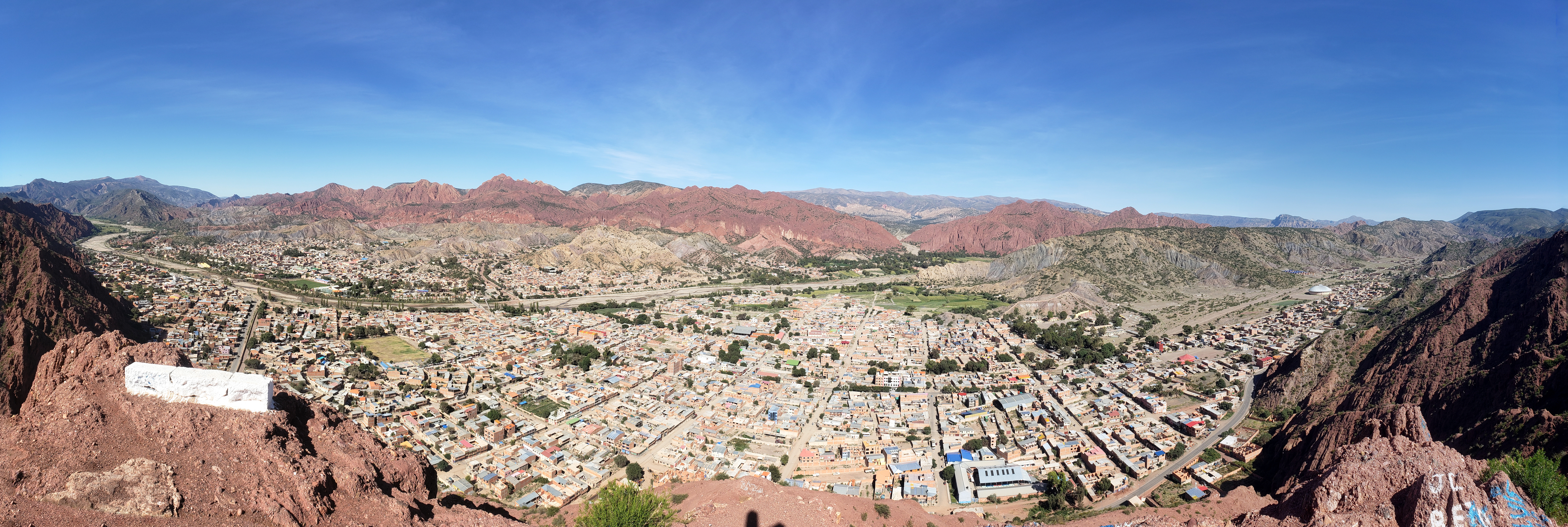
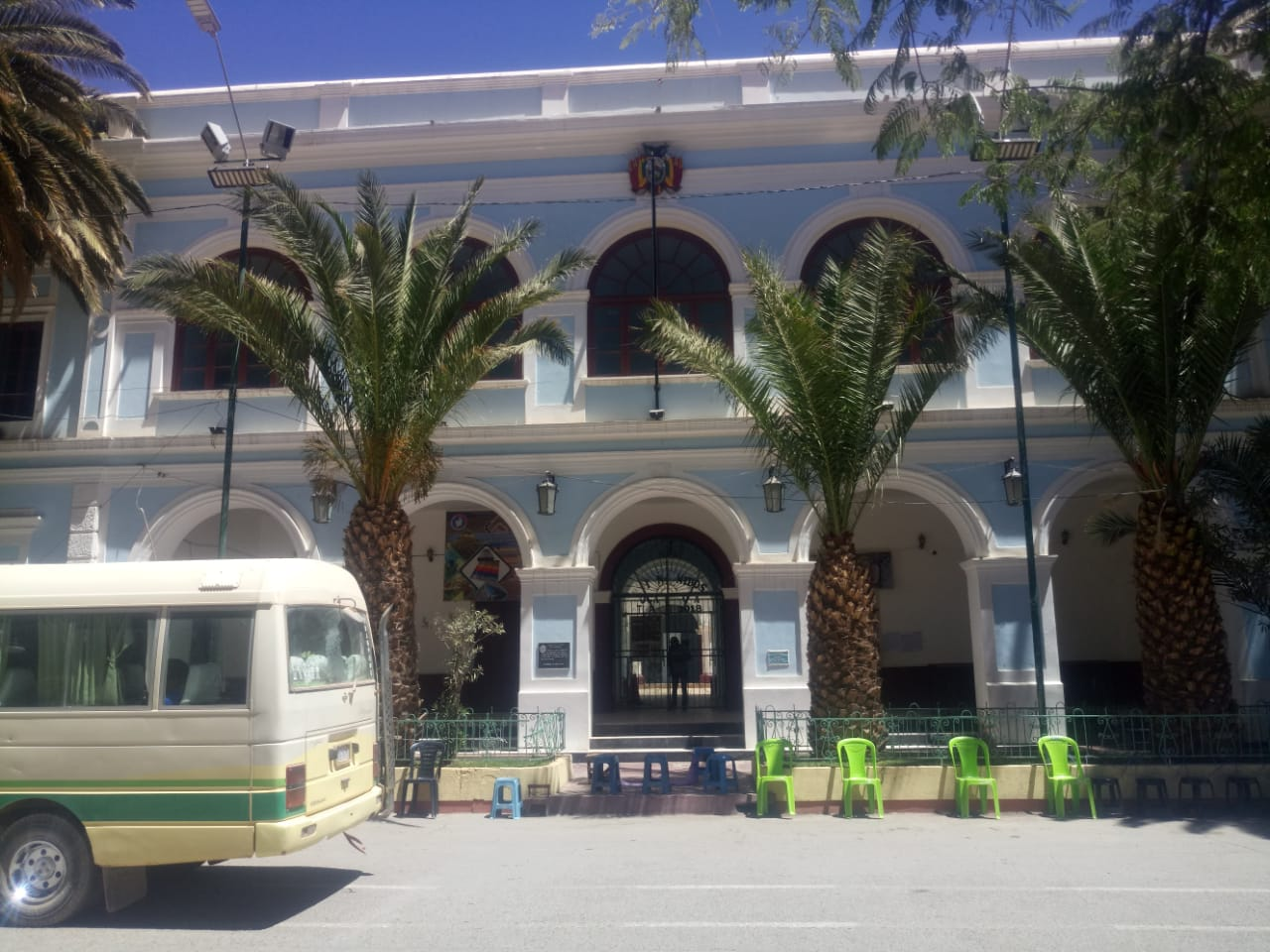

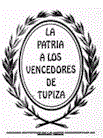
- Flag Coat of arms

- Location within Bolivia
- Coordinates: 21°26′15″S 65°42′57″W
- Country: Bolivia
- Department: Potosi
- Province: Sud Chichas
- Elevation: 2,850 m (9,350 ft)

Population (2009)
  - Total: 43,100 (2009)
- Time zone: UTC-4 (BOT)

Tupiza is a city in Potosí Department, Bolivia. It is located at an elevation of about 2850 m. The population is 25,709 (2012 estimate). Tupiza and its environs are characterized by dramatic red escarpments which jut ruggedly skyward from the coarse, gray terrain; green agricultural land adjacent to the nearby Tupiza River provides welcome respite from the otherwise arid, thorny surroundings. The area quebradas are susceptible to flash flood runoff from sudden cloudbursts.

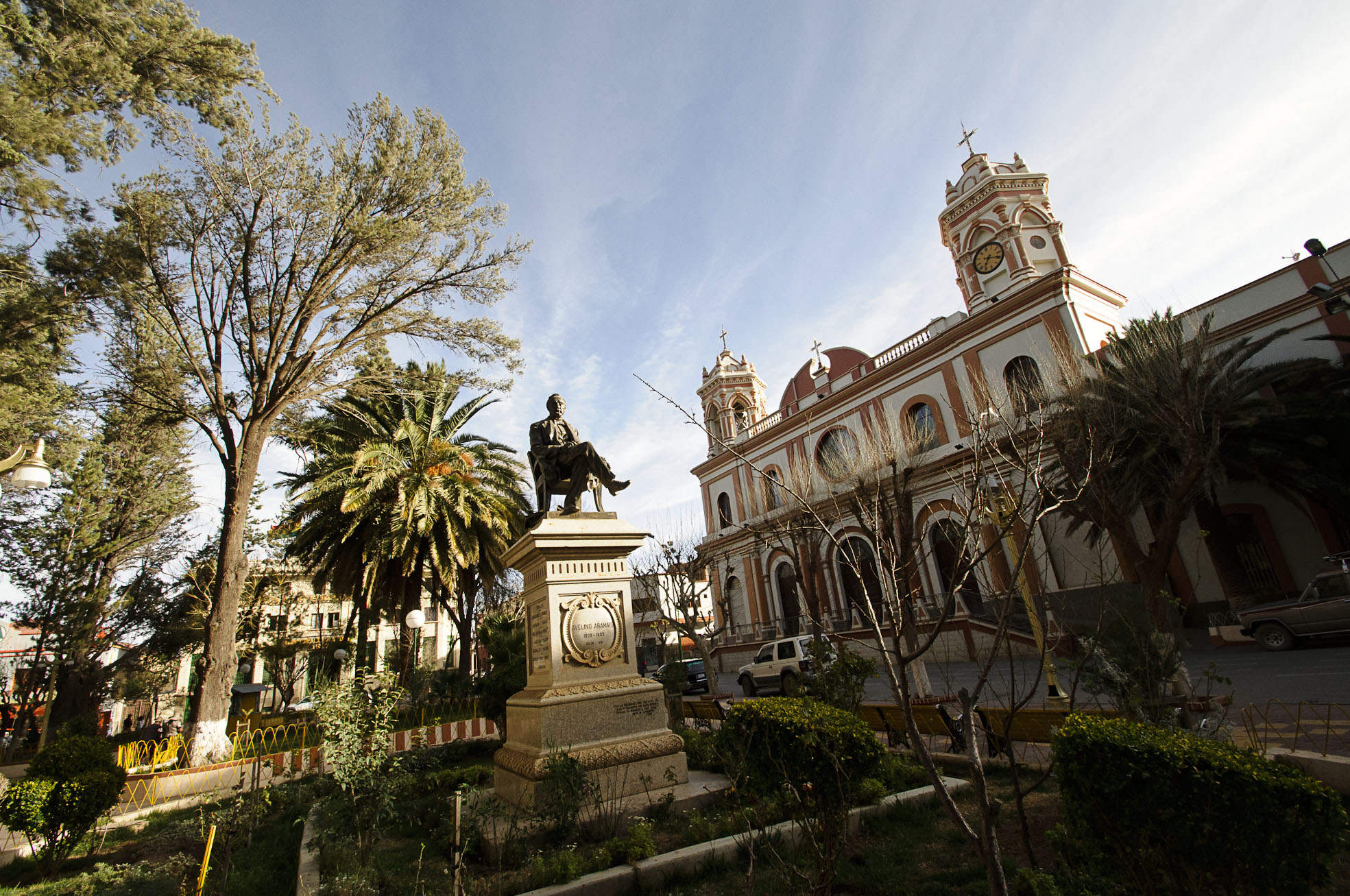
Tupiza plaza

Tupiza is the capital of the Sud Chichas Province within the Potosí Department. It is accessible via bus from Villazón to the south (and thereby both Argentina and Tarija) and Potosí to the north, as well as via the north-south train which served the mining settlements and runs the same route. From Tupiza, various towns in the local mining districts are accessible, as is the Salar de Uyuni.

== History ==
Lying along the Inca road system Tupiza was one localities where the forces of the Diego de Almagro's expedition to Chile used to regroup before advancing further south. The expeditionaries entered Tupiza in late 1535 and left it on January 1536.

Legend has it that Butch Cassidy and the Sundance Kid met their end at the hands of the Bolivian army in San Vincente, near Tupiza, concluding their notorious string of bank robbery raids. Various local outfitters provide horseback or jeep tours to the rumored site.

== Media ==
Bandera Roja newspaper was founded in 1947.

== Climate ==
Climate data for Tupiza, elevation 2,956 m (9,698 ft) (1974–2005)
| Month | Jan | Feb | Mar | Apr | May | Jun | Jul | Aug | Sep | Oct | Nov | Dec | Year |
|---|---|---|---|---|---|---|---|---|---|---|---|---|---|
| Record high °C (°F) | 31.1 (88.0) | 32.5 (90.5) | 32.3 (90.1) | 34.5 (94.1) | 28.8 (83.8) | 31.2 (88.2) | 33.0 (91.4) | 29.6 (85.3) | 31.0 (87.8) | 33.6 (92.5) | 33.0 (91.4) | 33.0 (91.4) | 34.5 (94.1) |
| Mean daily maximum °C (°F) | 24.8 (76.6) | 24.8 (76.6) | 25.0 (77.0) | 25.5 (77.9) | 23.6 (74.5) | 21.6 (70.9) | 21.6 (70.9) | 23.2 (73.8) | 24.6 (76.3) | 26.3 (79.3) | 26.6 (79.9) | 26.0 (78.8) | 24.5 (76.0) |
| Daily mean °C (°F) | 17.2 (63.0) | 17.2 (63.0) | 16.9 (62.4) | 15.3 (59.5) | 11.8 (53.2) | 9.5 (49.1) | 9.4 (48.9) | 11.7 (53.1) | 14.0 (57.2) | 16.5 (61.7) | 17.6 (63.7) | 17.8 (64.0) | 14.6 (58.2) |
| Mean daily minimum °C (°F) | 9.7 (49.5) | 9.6 (49.3) | 8.7 (47.7) | 5.1 (41.2) | 0.1 (32.2) | −2.6 (27.3) | −2.8 (27.0) | 0.2 (32.4) | 3.4 (38.1) | 6.7 (44.1) | 8.5 (47.3) | 9.5 (49.1) | 4.7 (40.4) |
| Record low °C (°F) | 3.0 (37.4) | 2.0 (35.6) | 0.0 (32.0) | −6.0 (21.2) | −6.6 (20.1) | −9.0 (15.8) | −11.5 (11.3) | −10.5 (13.1) | −5.0 (23.0) | −3.0 (26.6) | −2.0 (28.4) | 3.0 (37.4) | −11.5 (11.3) |
| Average precipitation mm (inches) | 85.6 (3.37) | 65.0 (2.56) | 41.2 (1.62) | 5.8 (0.23) | 0.3 (0.01) | 0.4 (0.02) | 0.1 (0.00) | 1.1 (0.04) | 3.4 (0.13) | 7.5 (0.30) | 20.9 (0.82) | 60.4 (2.38) | 291.7 (11.48) |
| Average precipitation days | 14.3 | 11.8 | 9.1 | 2.2 | 0.1 | 0.2 | 0.1 | 0.5 | 0.9 | 2.2 | 5.1 | 11.4 | 57.9 |
| Average relative humidity (%) | 63.6 | 63.8 | 62.4 | 58.0 | 56.9 | 57.2 | 56.9 | 53.4 | 49.4 | 52.4 | 53.2 | 60.4 | 57.3 |
Source: Servicio Nacional de Meteorología e Hidrología de Bolivia
