= Jorge Berindoague =

Bolivian politician

Jorge Berindoague Alcocer is a Bolivian politician who served as Minister without Portfolio responsible for Hydrocarbons and Energy, from March to October 2003, under Gonzalo Sánchez de Lozada. Berindoague is a member of MNR.

He left Bolivia in the wake of his actions during the 2003 Bolivian gas conflict, taking refuge in the United States of America. In 2008 he faced extradition for his role in that conflict, but in 2012 the American government rejected this, on the grounds that the Gas Conflict did not meet the definition of genocide as specified in the American-Bolivian extradition treaty of 1995; as well, in 2007 Berindoague told the Associated Press that he "had long been" an American citizen.
