= Atocha Municipality =

- Municipality
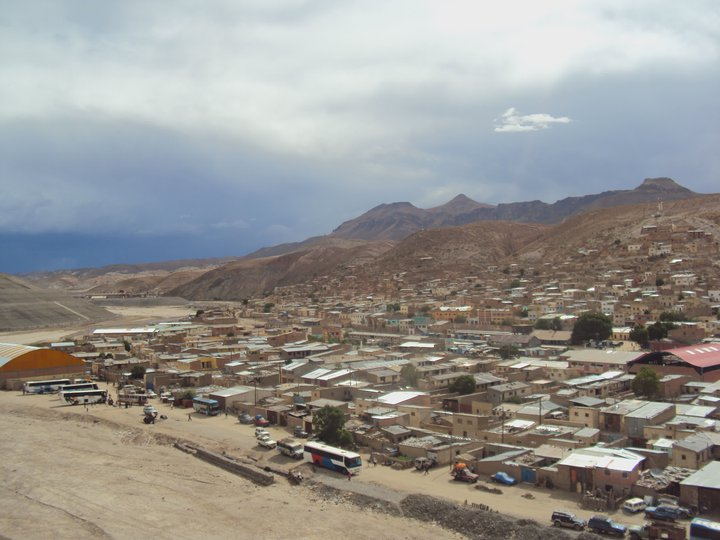
- Atocha

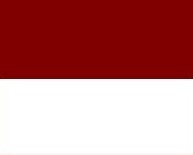
- Flag

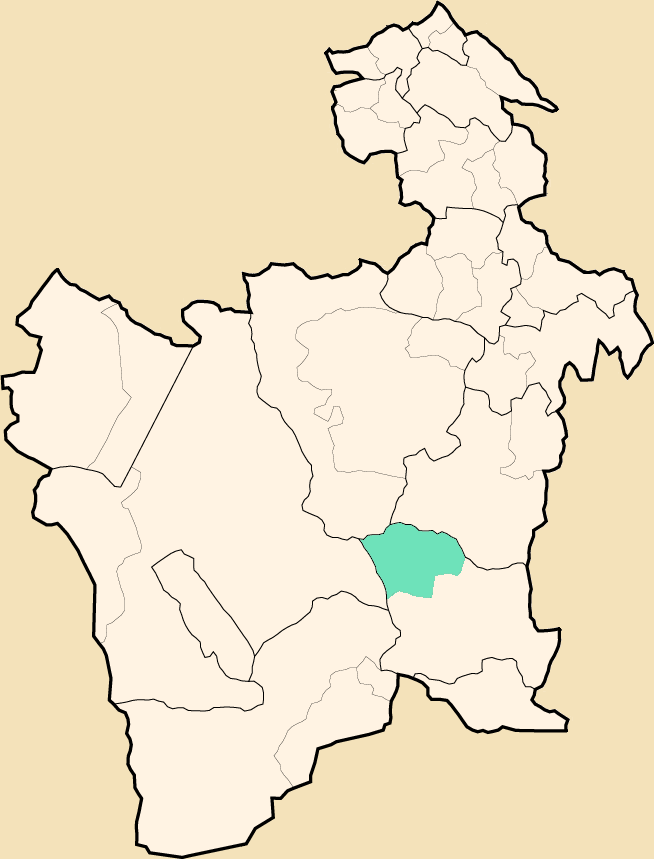
- Location within Potosí Department

- Location within Bolivia
- Coordinates: 21°6′S 66°2′W
- Country: Bolivia
- Department: Potosí Department
- Province: Sud Chichas Province
- Foundation: September 21, 1963
- Seat: Atocha

Government
  - Mayor: Braulio Flores

Population (2001)
  - Total: 9,536
  - Ethnicities: Quechua
- Time zone: UTC-4 (BOT)

Atocha Municipality is the second municipal section of the Sud Chichas Province in the Potosí Department in Bolivia. Its seat is Atocha. It is located within the Andes mountain range.

== Subdivision ==
Atocha Municipality was created on September 21, 1963 by Law No. 245 consisting of the following seven cantons: Chocaya, Portugalete, San Vicente, Santa Bárbara, Tacmari, Guadalupe and Chorolque Viejo.

The National Institute of Statistics of Bolivia INE lists eight divisions of the municipality of Atocha: Atocha, Chorolque, Chorolque Viejo, Portugalete, Chocaya, Guadalupe, San Vicente, Santa Bárbara.

== The people ==
The people are predominantly indigenous citizens of Quechua descent.

| Ethnic group | % |
|---|---|
| Quechua | 70.6 |
| Aymara | 2.8 |
| Guaraní, Chiquitos, Moxos | 0.2 |
| Not indigenous | 26.4 |
| Other indigenous groups | 0.1 |

== Languages ==
The languages spoken in the municipality are mainly Spanish and Quechua .

| Language | Inhabitants |
|---|---|
| Quechua | 4,910 |
| Aymara | 274 |
| Guaraní | 11 |
| Another native | 1 |
| Spanish | 8,580 |
| Foreign | 26 |
| Only native | 395 |
| Native and Spanish | 4,602 |
| Only Spanish | 3,979 |

Ref: obd.descentralizacion.gov.bo

== Places of interest ==
The colonial settlement Atocha Viejo ("Old Atocha") as well as the land relief are a tourist attraction.

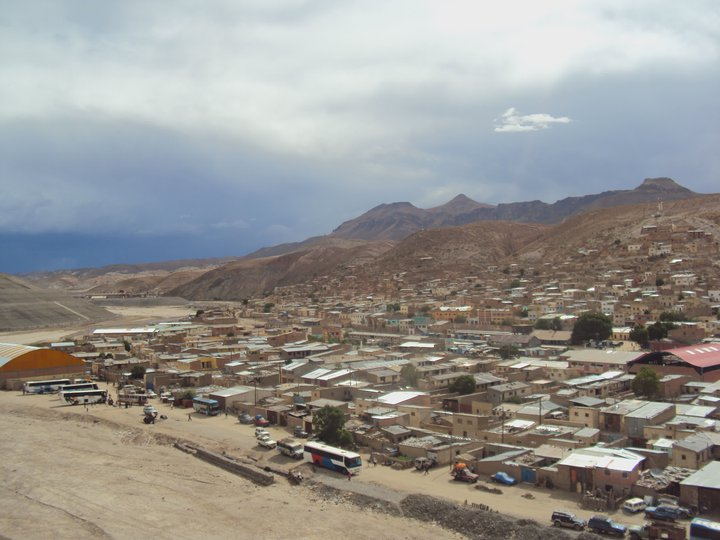
Atocha

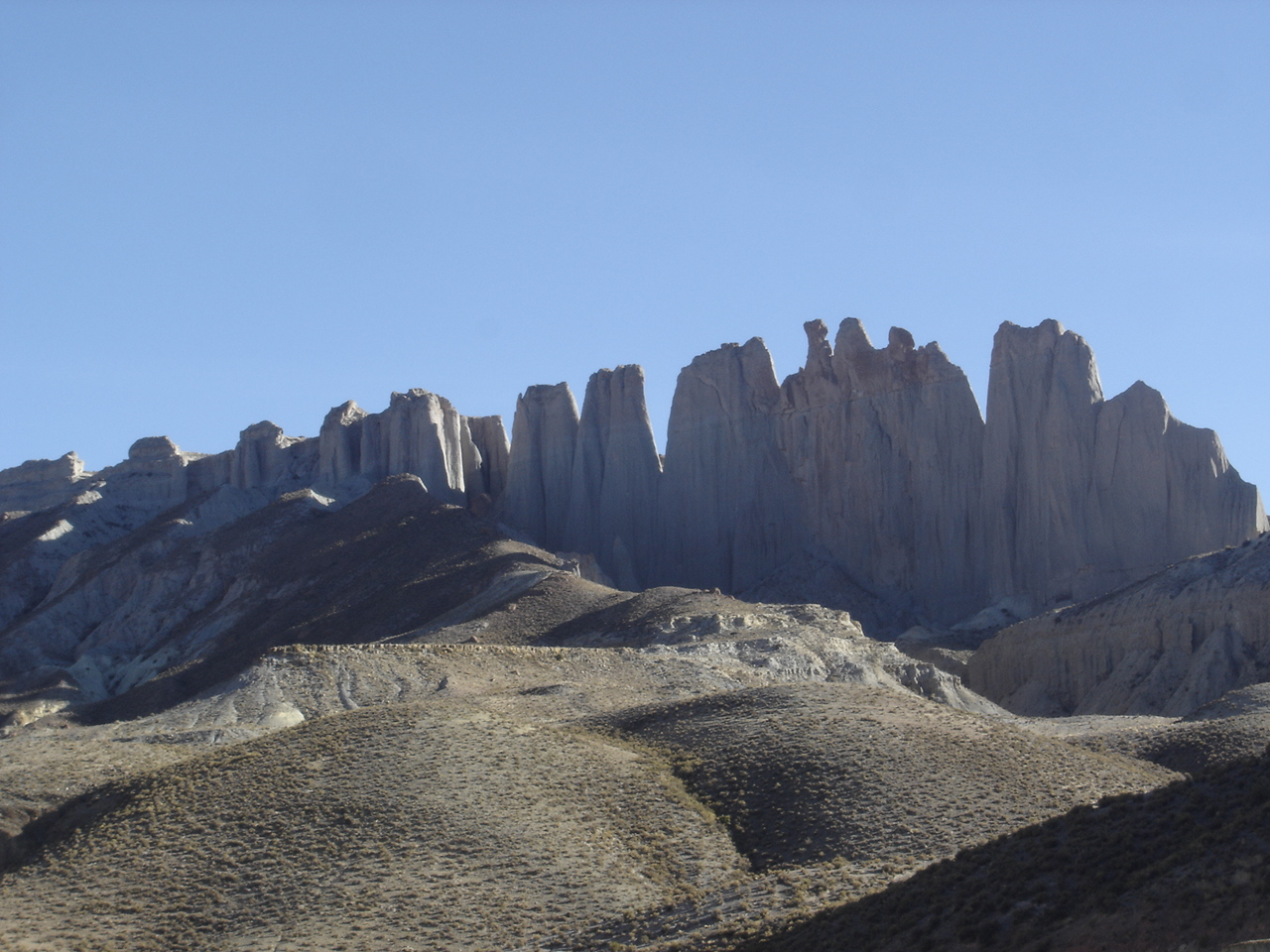
"The sails" (Las velas)

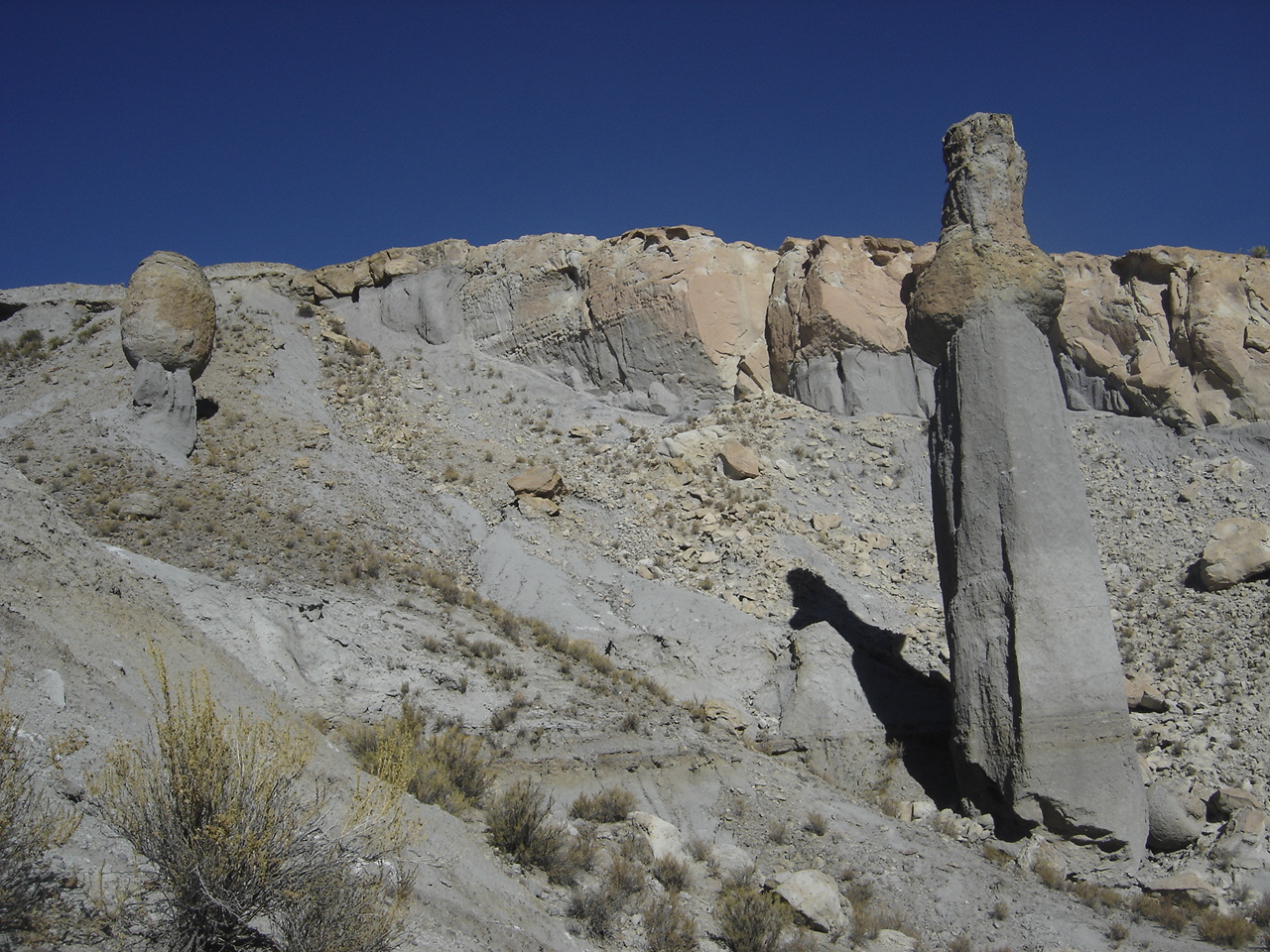
The egg and the bottle (El huevo y la botella)

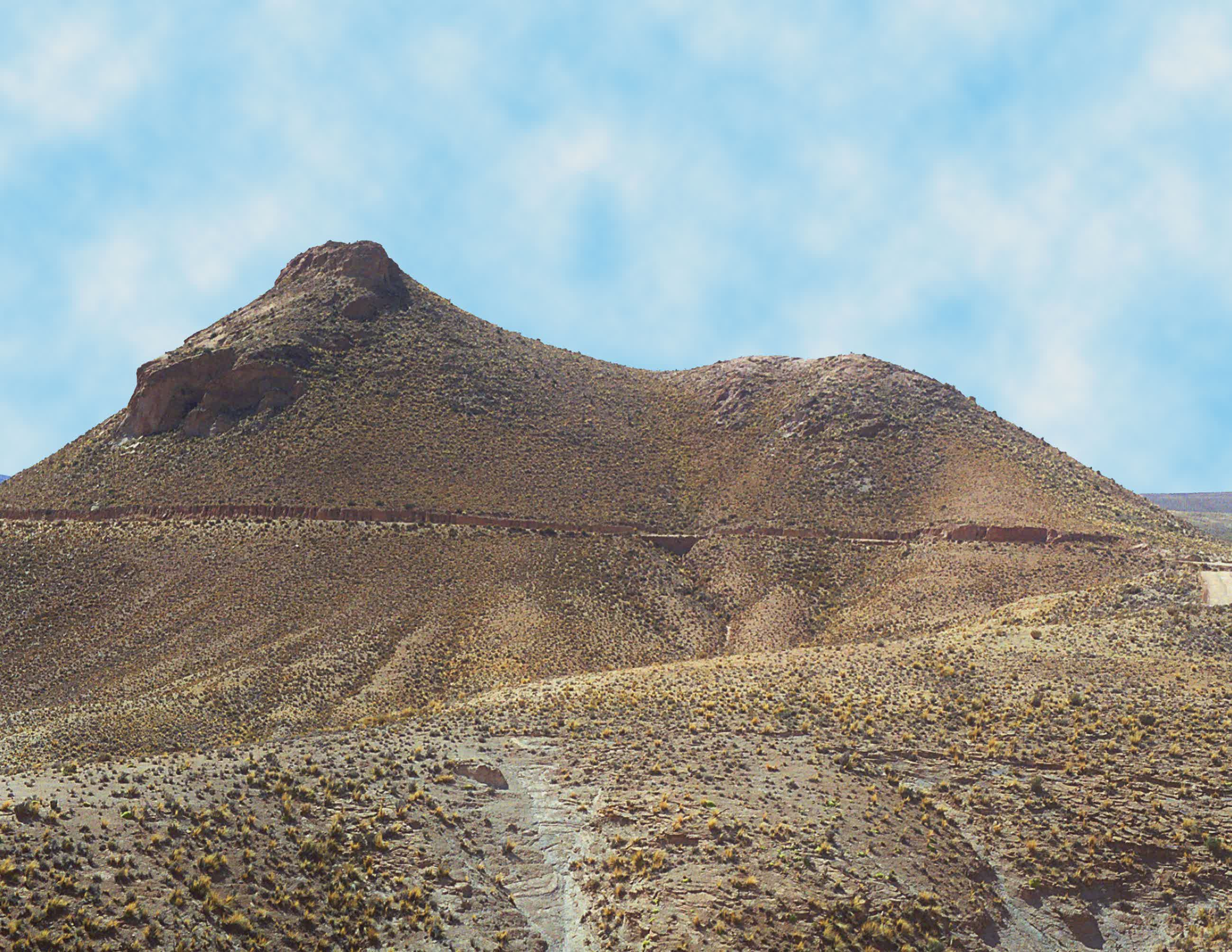
"Lion" (La leona), Chorolque

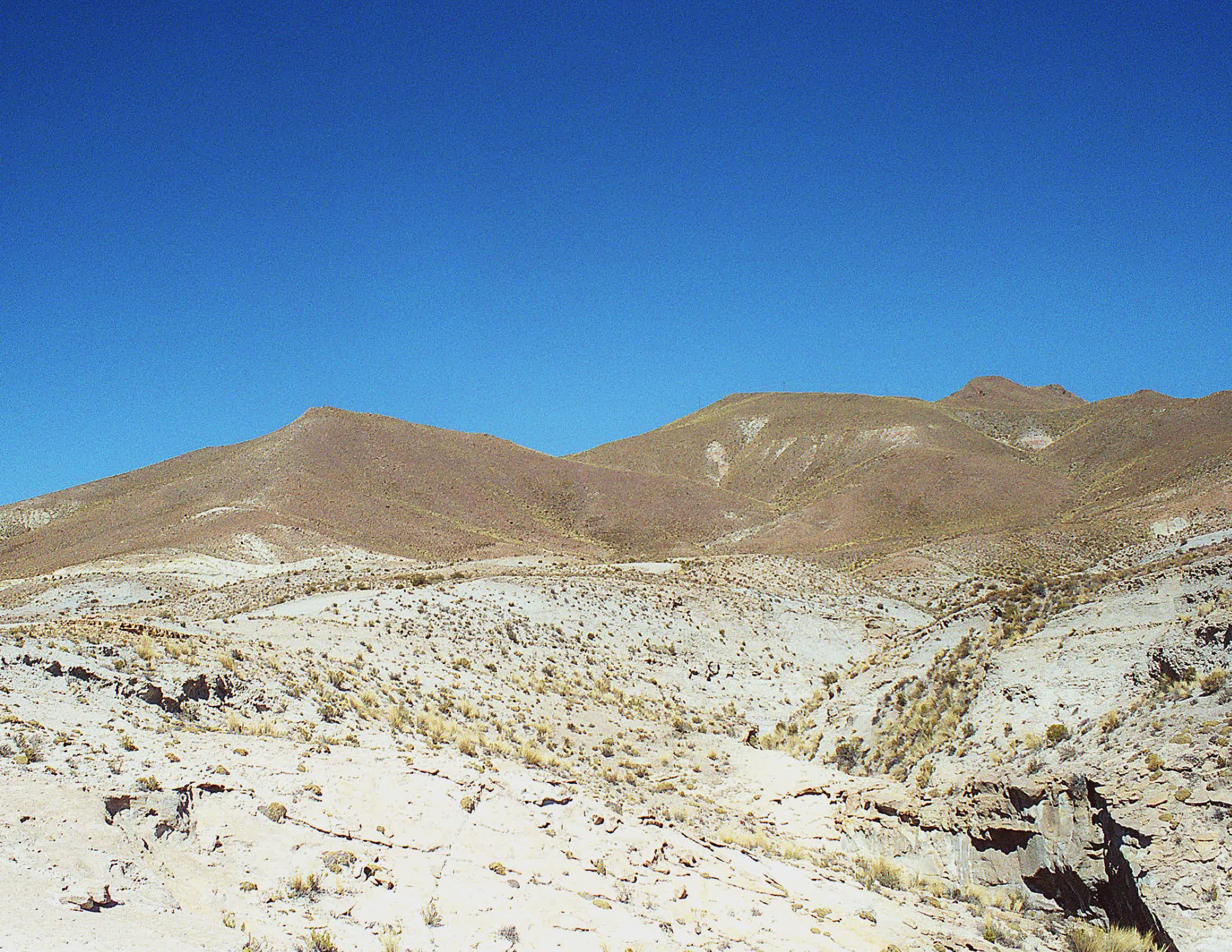
"Sleeping Beauty" (La Bella Durmiente)

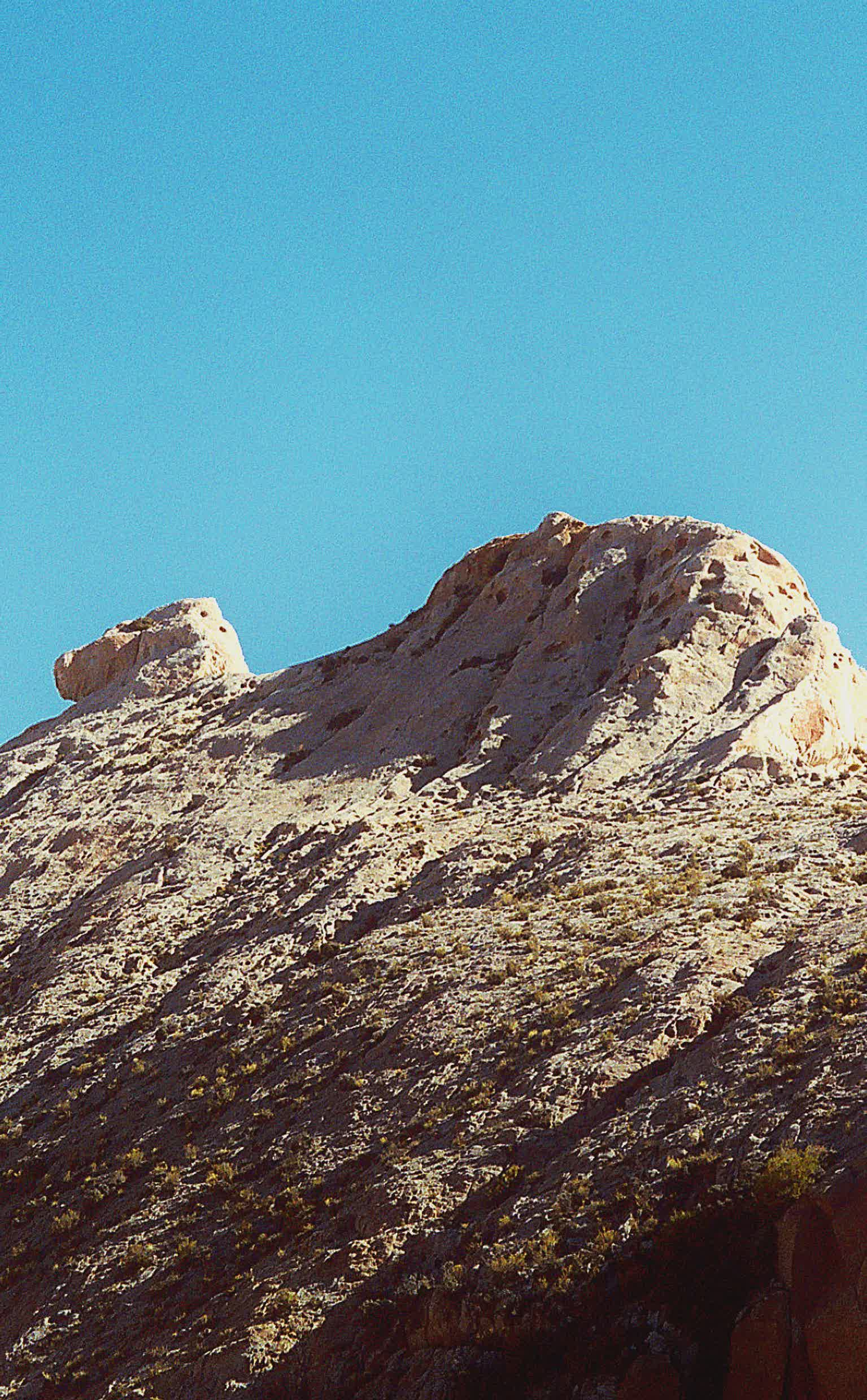
"The camel" (El Camello)

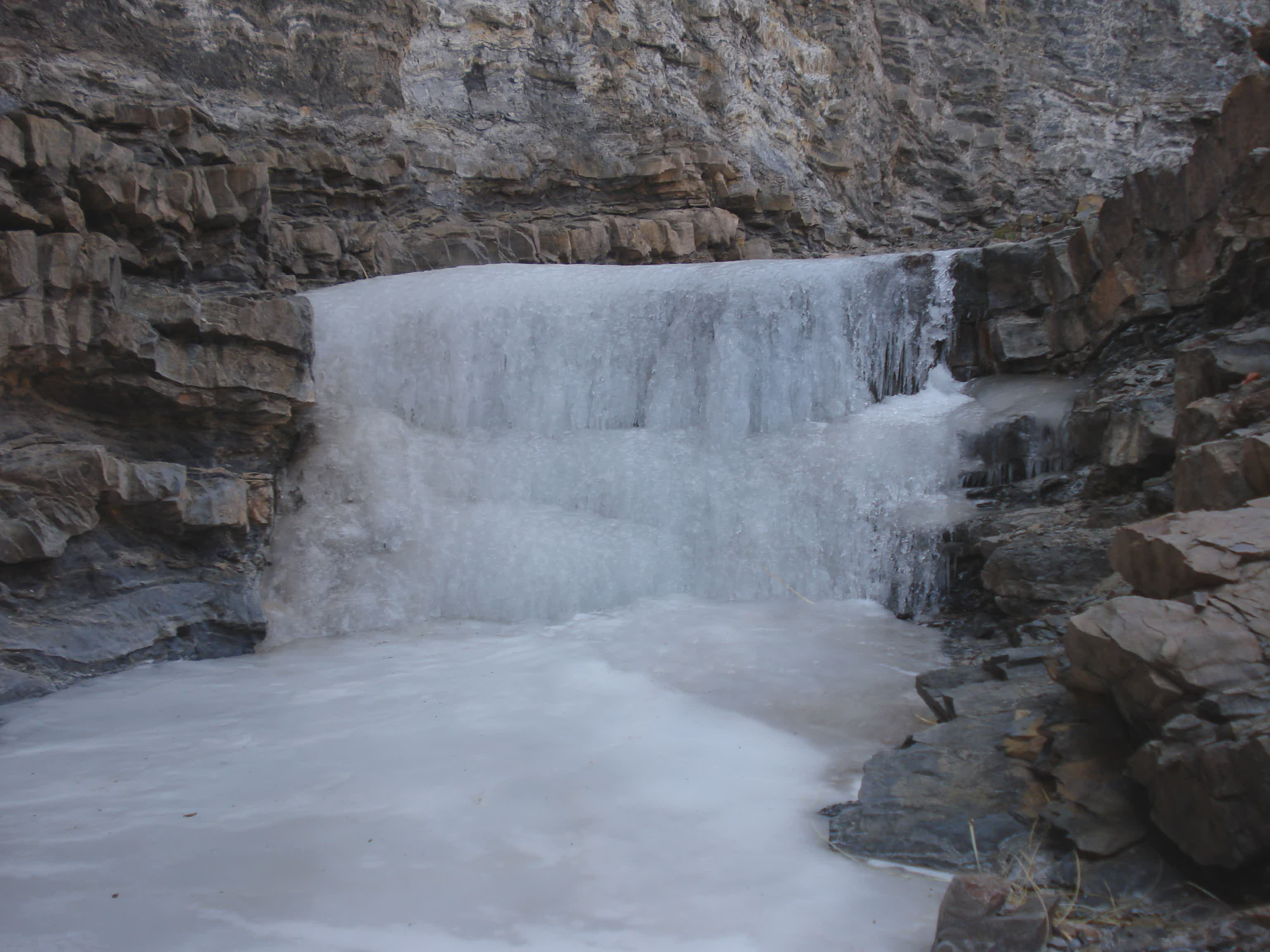
El hielito

== See also ==
- Kunturillu
- Santa Bárbara (Chorolque)
- Siete Suyos
- Wila Qullu
