= Sud Chichas Province =

Sud Chichas / Sur Chichas
- Province
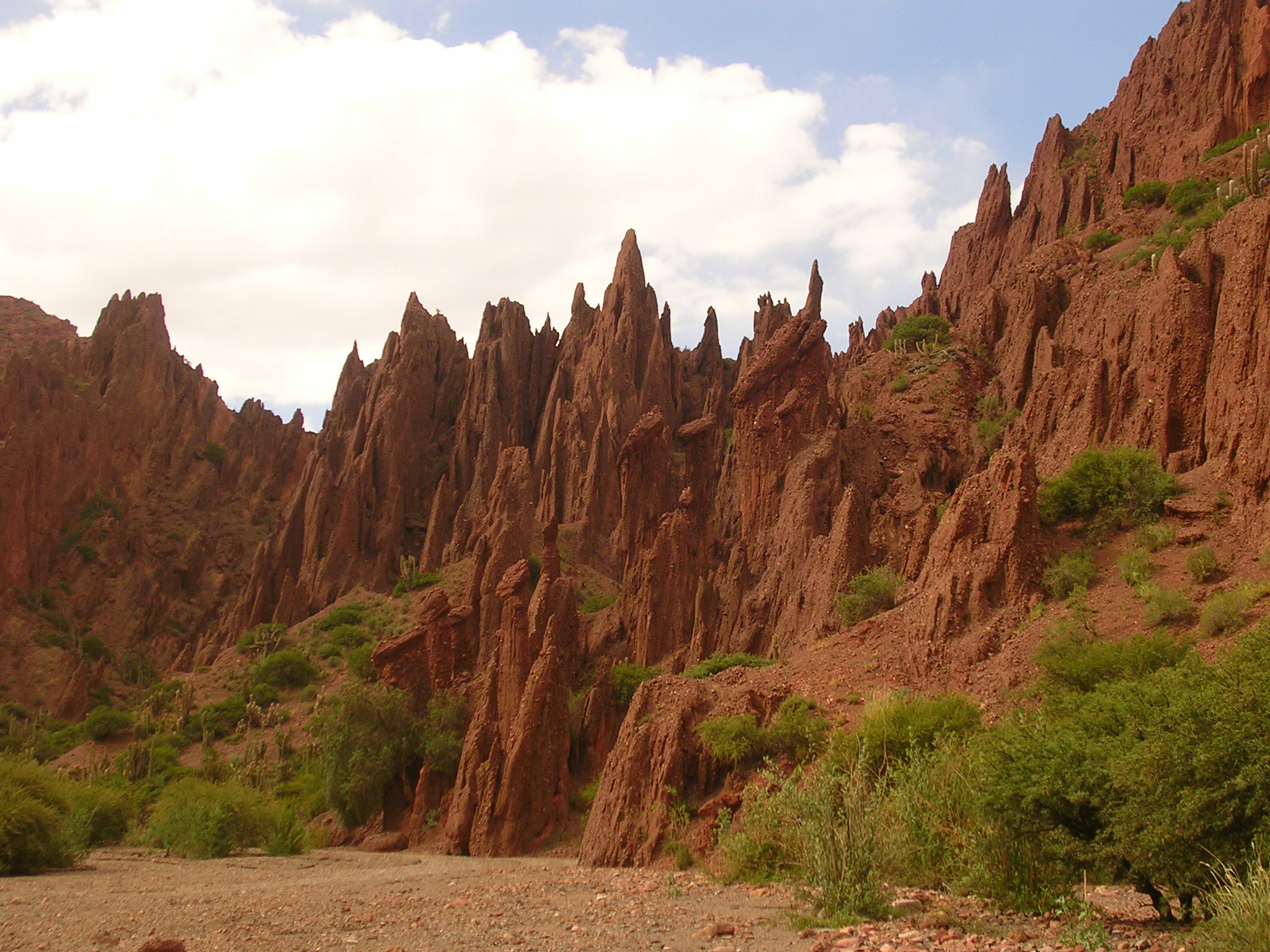
- On the way to "Cañón del Inca" near Tupiza

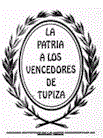
- Flag Seal

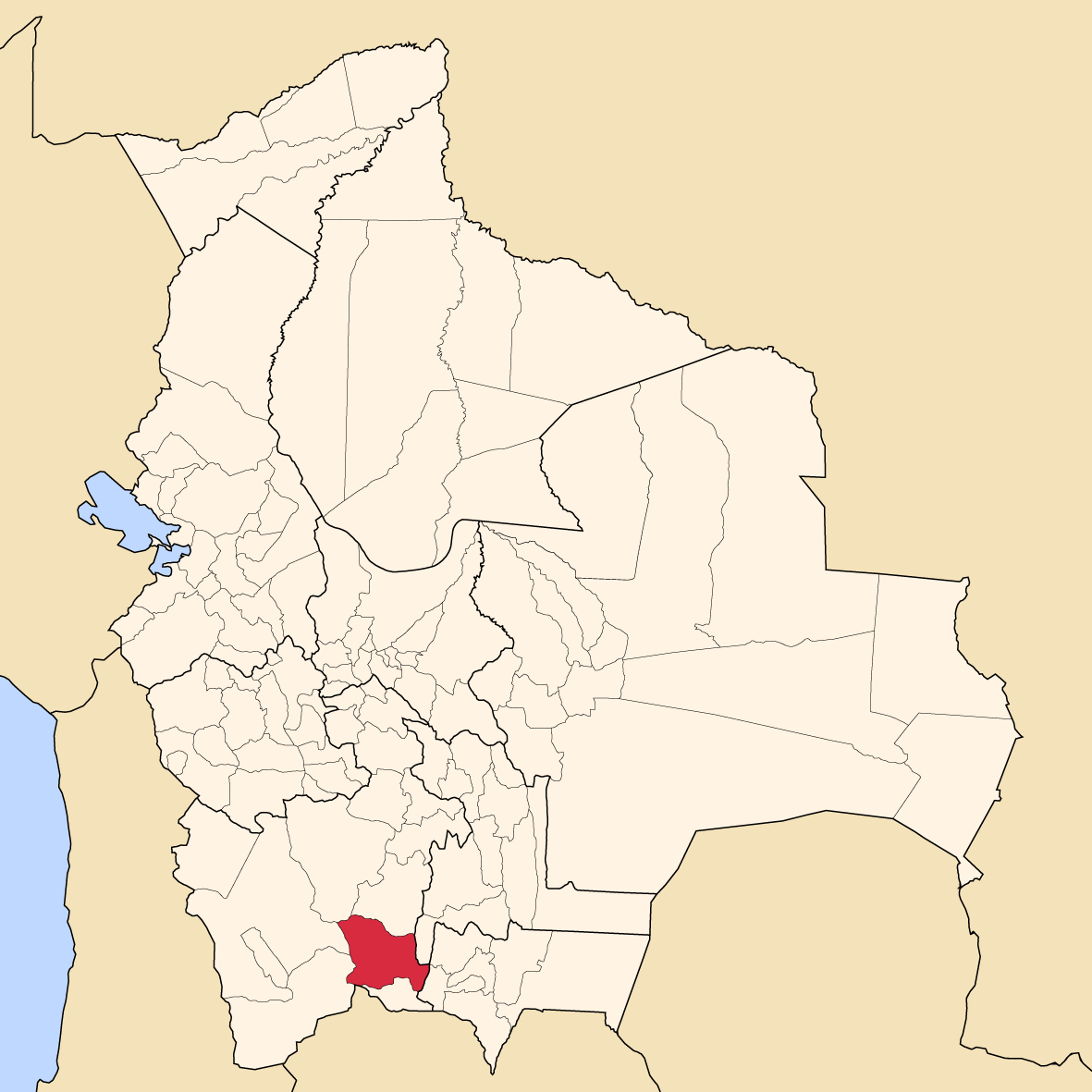
- Location of the Sud Chichas Province within Bolivia

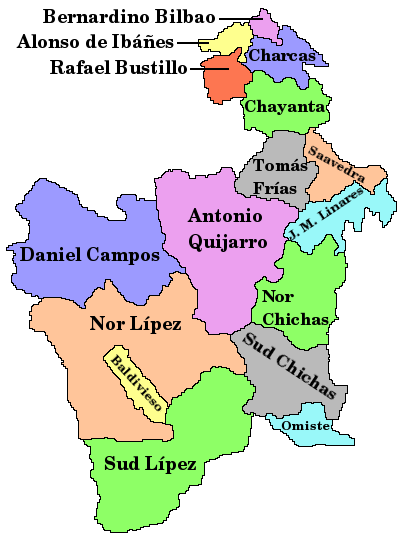
- Provinces of the Potosí Department
- Coordinates: 21°20′S 65°50′W
- Country: Bolivia
- Department: Potosí Department
- Capital: Tupiza

Area
  - Total: 3,150 sq mi (8,158 km^{2})

Population (2024)
  - Total: 54,895
  - Density: 17.43/sq mi (6.729/km^{2})
  - Ethnicities: Quechua
- Time zone: UTC-4 (BOT)
- Area code: BO.PO.SC

Sud Chichas (or: Sur Chichas) is a province in the Bolivian department of Potosí. Its seat is Tupiza.

== Location ==
Sud Chichas province is one of sixteen provinces in the Potosí Department. It is located between 20° 51' and 21° 50' South and between 65° 15' and 66° 30' West. It borders Nor Chichas Province in the north, Antonio Quijarro Province in the north-west, Nor Lípez Province and Sur Lípez Province in the west, the Republic of Argentina and Modesto Omiste Province in the south, Tarija Department in the south-east, and Chuquisaca Department in the east.

The province extends over 130 km from east to west and from north to south.

== Division ==
The province comprises two municipalities which are further subdivided into cantons.

Section	Municipality	Seat
1st	Tupiza Municipality	Tupiza
2nd	Atocha Municipality	Atocha

== Population ==
The main language of the province is Spanish, spoken by 96%, while 59% of the population speak Quechua. The population dropped from 52,308 inhabitants (1992 census) to 47,873 (2001 census), a decrease of 8.5%.

45% of the population have no access to electricity, 74% have no sanitary facilities. 34% of the population are employed in agriculture, 11% in mining, 6% in industry, 49% in general services. 88% of the population are Catholics, 8% Protestants.

The people are predominantly indigenous citizens of Quechua descent.

Ethnic group	Tupiza Municipality (%)	Atocha Municipality (%)
Quechua	57.0	70.6
Aymara	1.7	2.8
Guaraní, Chiquitos, Moxos	0.2	0.2
Not indigenous	38.5	26.4
Other indigenous groups	2.5	0.1

== See also ==
- Kunturillu
- Wila Qullu
