= Malla =

Malla may refer to:

== Places ==
Bolivia

- Malla, Bolivia, a locality
- Malla Jawira, a river
- Malla Jaqhi, a mountain
- Malla Municipality
- Malla Qullu, a mountain

India

- Mallapuram, Tamil Nadu
- Malla (tribe), an ancient republic, one of the sixteen Mahajanapadas
- Malla Bedian, a village
- Mallabhum, a former kingdom in West Bengal
- Malla Reddy Institute of Medical Sciences near Hyderabad

Nepal

- Malla (Nepal), dynasty who ruled the Kathmandu valley
- Khasa Malla kingdom, Kingdom of Khas people of Nepal
- List of Malla Kings of Nepal

Other

- Malla (Crete), a town of ancient Crete, Greece
- Malla, Barcelona, a municipality in Catalonia
- Malla, Estonia, a village in Estonia
- Malla, Pakistan, a village
- Malla Strict Nature Reserve in Lapland, Finland
- Vilcún La Malla Airport in Chile

== Other ==
- Malla (given name)
- Malla (surname)
- Mallas – people who practice Malla-yuddha, Indian wrestling
- Malla (film), a 2004 Kannada film
- Kalla Malla Sulla, a 2011 Kannada film
- Malla dynasty (Nepal)

== See also ==
- Mal (disambiguation)
- Mala (disambiguation)
