= Quta Qutani (Bolivia) =

Mountain in Bolivia

- Location within Bolivia

Highest point
- Elevation: 4,600 m (15,100 ft)
- Coordinates: 17°00′13″S 67°28′10″W

Geography
- Location: Bolivia; La Paz Department, Loayza Province
- Parent range: Andes

Quta Qutani (Aymara quta lake, the reduplication signifies that there is a group or a complex of something, -ni a suffix to indicate ownership, "the one with a group of lakes", also spelled Kkota Kkotani) is a mountain in the Bolivian Andes, about 4,600 metres (15,092 ft) high. It is located in the La Paz Department, Loayza Province, Malla Municipality. Quta Qutani is situated northwest of the little town of Malla and the mountains named Malla Qullu and Wila Willk'i and northeast of Kunturiri. The Jach'a K'uchu Jawira (Jachcha Khuchu Jahuira) originates east of the mountain. It flows along its southeastern slope and to the southwest as a tributary of the Malla Jawira.
