= Chillwa Quta =

Lake in Bolivia

- Location within Bolivia Location within South America
- Interactive map of Chillwa Quta
- Location: Bolivia, La Paz Department, Loayza Province
- Coordinates: 16°49′49″S 67°30′57″W
- Surface elevation: ≈ 4,300 m (14,100 ft)

Chillwa Quta, also spelled Chillhua Kkota, is a lake in the Kimsa Cruz mountain range in the Andes of Bolivia. It is situated in the La Paz Department, Loayza Province, Cairoma Municipality. Chillwa Quta lies south-west of the mountain Mama Uqllu, south of the lake Warus Quta and south-east of the mountain Taruja Umaña. This is where the river Taruj Umaña originates. It flows to the west and then to the north-west as an affluent of the La Paz River.

The name Chillwa Quta comes from Aymara: ch'illiwa (or chillwa), meaning "a species of grass (Festuca dolichophylla)", and quta "lake".
