= Turrini =

Turrini is an Italian surname. Notable people with the surname include:

- Diego Turrini, an Italian astrophysicist and planetologist for whom the minor planet 11803 Turrini is named
- Federico Turrini, Italian swimmer
- Francesco Turrini (born 1965), Italian footballer and manager
- Giordano Turrini (born 1942), Italian cyclist
- Peter Turrini (born 1944), Austrian playwright

== See also ==
- Turi Turini (disambiguation)
- Turini (disambiguation)
- Torrini (disambiguation)
