= Ch'uxña Quta (Loayza) =

Mountain in Bolivia

- Location within Bolivia

Highest point
- Elevation: 4,920 m (16,140 ft)
- Coordinates: 17°0′S 67°23′W

Geography
- Location: Bolivia
- Parent range: Andes, Kimsa Cruz mountain range

Ch'uxña Quta (Aymara ch'uxña green, quta lake, "green lake", Hispanicized spelling Chojñakhota, Chojna Khota, Chojna Kkota, Chojña Kkota) is a mountain in the Bolivian Andes, about 4,920 metres (16,142 ft) high. It lies in the Kimsa Cruz mountain range, west of Wallatani Lake. It is situated in the La Paz Department, Loayza Province, Malla Municipality.

== See also ==
- Mama Uqllu
- Quri Ch'uma
- Yaypuri
- List of mountains in the Andes
