= Machaq Marka =

Mountain in Bolivia

- Location within Bolivia

Highest point
- Elevation: 3,400 m (11,200 ft)
- Coordinates: 17°01′30″S 67°37′28″W

Geography
- Location: Bolivia; La Paz Department, Loayza Province
- Parent range: Andes

Machaq Marka (Aymara machaqa new, marka village, "new village", also spelled Machaj Marca) is a mountain in the Bolivian Andes which reaches a height of approximately 3,400 m (11,200 ft). It is located in the La Paz Department, Loayza Province, Luribay Municipality. Machaq Marka lies northeast of Lawrani and Qullpani.
