= Turini (Loayza) =

Mountain in Bolivia

- Location within Bolivia

Highest point
- Elevation: 4,138 m (13,576 ft)
- Coordinates: 17°04′04″S 67°32′36″W

Geography
- Location: Bolivia; La Paz Department, Loayza Province
- Parent range: Andes

Turini (Aymara turi tower, -ni a suffix, "the one with a tower", also spelled Torrini) is a 4,138-metre-high (13,576 ft) mountain in the Bolivian Andes. It is located in the La Paz Department, Loayza Province, Luribay Municipality. Turini lies between Jach'a Walluni in the southeast and Lluxita in the northwest. The Malla Jawira flows along its slopes.
