= Anchallani =

- Town
- Location within Bolivia
- Coordinates: 17°8′S 67°41′W
- Country: Bolivia
- Department: La Paz Department
- Province: Loayza Province
- Municipality: Luribay Municipality

Population (2001)
  - Total: 643
- Time zone: UTC-4 (BOT)

Anchallani is a small town in Bolivia. In 2010 it had an estimated population of 813.

== Location ==
Anchallani is the most populous town of Luribay Municipality in Loayza Province. The village lies at an elevation of 4187m in a valley 10 km south-west of the río Luribay and 20 km from Luribay, the main town of the municipality.

== Geography ==
Anchallani is in the Serranía de Sicasica, between the Bolivian altiplano in the west and the Amazonian lowlands in the east.

== Transport ==
Anchallani is around 160 km by road south-east of La Paz.
