= Fire Mountain =

Fire Mountain may refer to:

== Mountains and volcanos ==
- Huoyan Mountain, Taiwan
- Kostal Cone, British Columbia, Canada
- Musuan Peak, Philippines
- Mount Merapi, Indonesia
- Nina Qullu, Oruro, Bolivia
- Nina Qullu (La Paz), Bolivia

== Other uses ==
- Fire Mountain Scout Camp, a Boy Scout camp in Washington state; see Scouting in Washington (state) § Mount Baker Council
- Yanar Dag, a natural gas fire which blazes continuously in Azerbaijan
- Fire Mountain, a restaurant chain owned by Buffets, Inc.
- Fire Mountain, an art installation by Czech artist Epos 257

== See also ==
- Jacawitz, a Guatemalan deity
