= Uqi Chaka =

Mountain in Bolivia

- Location within Bolivia

Highest point
- Elevation: 4,780 m (15,680 ft)
- Coordinates: 17°10′31″S 67°43′50″W

Geography
- Location: Bolivia; La Paz Department
- Parent range: Andes

Uqi Chaka (Aymara uqi brown, grey-brown, chaka bridge, "grey-brown bridge", also spelled Okhe Chaca) is a mountain in the Bolivian Andes which reaches a height of approximately 4,780 m (15,680 ft). It is located in the La Paz Department, Loayza Province, Luribay Municipality. Uqi Chaka lies northeast of Qillwan Quta at the road which connects Patacamaya (Patak Amaya) and Luribay.
