= Urqu Jipiña =

Mountain in Bolivia

- Location within Bolivia

Highest point
- Elevation: 4,800 m (15,700 ft)
- Coordinates: 17°09′40″S 67°45′25″W

Geography
- Location: Bolivia; La Paz Department
- Parent range: Andes

Urqu Jipiña (Aymara urqu male, male animal, jipiña squatting of animals, "where the male animals crouch", also spelled Orkho Jipina, Orkho Jipiña) is a mountain in the Bolivian Andes which reaches a height of approximately 4,800 m (15,700 ft). It is located in the La Paz Department, Loayza Province, Luribay Municipality. Urqu Jipiña lies southwest of Q'ara Qullu.
