= Jach'a Ch'apini =

Mountain in Bolivia

- Location within Bolivia

Highest point
- Elevation: 3,500 m (11,500 ft)
- Coordinates: 17°07′44″S 67°34′16″W

Geography
- Location: Bolivia; La Paz Department, Loayza Province, Luribay Municipality
- Parent range: Andes

Jach'a Ch'apini (Aymara jach'a big, ch'api thorn, -ni a suffix, "the big one with thorns", also spelled Jachcha Chapini) is a mountain in the Bolivian Andes which reaches a height of approximately 3,500 m (11,500 ft). It is located in the La Paz Department, Loayza Province, Luribay Municipality. Jach'a Ch'apini lies at the Luribay River, southwest of Jach'a Qullu and northwest of Ch'apini.
