= Janq'u Quta =

Janq'u Quta (Aymara janq'u white, quta lake, white lake", also spelled Janco Ccota, Jankho Khota, Jankho Kkota, Jankho Kota, Janko Cota, Janko Khota, Janko Kota, Janccoccota, Jancoccota, Jancocota, Janjojota, Janjoqota, Jankokkota) may refer to:

== Lakes ==
- Janq'u Quta (Batallas), in the Batallas Municipality, Los Andes Province, La Paz Department, Bolivia
- Janq'u Quta (El Alto), in the El Alto Municipality, Pedro Domingo Murillo Province, La Paz Department, Bolivia
- Janq'u Quta (La Paz), in the La Paz Municipality, Pedro Domingo Murillo Province, La Paz Department, Bolivia
- Janq'u Quta (Larecaja), in the Larecaja Province, La Paz Department, Bolivia
- Janq'u Quta (Yaco), in the Yaco Municipality, Loayza Province, La Department, Bolivia
- Janq'u Quta (Omasuyos), in the Omasuyos Province, La Paz Department, Bolivia
- Janq'u Quta (Arequipa), in the Arequipa Region, Peru
- Janq'u Quta (Puno), in the Puno Region, Peru

== Mountain ==
- Janq'u Quta (Inquisivi), in the Inquisivi Province, La Paz Department, Bolivia
- Janq'u Quta (Loayza), in the Loayza Province, La Paz Department, Bolivia

== Places ==
- Janq'u Quta, Arequipa in the Arequipa Region, Peru
