= Kuntur Jiwaña =

Mountain in Bolivia

- Location within Bolivia

Highest point
- Elevation: 3,760 m (12,340 ft)
- Coordinates: 17°00′42″S 67°33′46″W

Geography
- Location: Bolivia; La Paz Department, Loayza Province
- Parent range: Andes

Kuntur Jiwaña (Aymara kunturi condor, jiwaña to die; massacre, slaughter, slaughtering, also spelled Condor Jihuaña) is a mountain in the Bolivian Andes which reaches a height of approximately 3,760 m (12,340 ft). It is located in the La Paz Department, Loayza Province, on the border of the municipalities of Cairoma and Luribay. Kuntur Jiwaña lies east of Janq'u Willk'i.
