= Achachi Qala =

Achachi Qala may refer to:

- Achachi Qala (Quiabaya), a mountain in the Quiabaya Municipality, Larecaja Province, La Paz Department, Bolivia
- Achachi Qala (Cairoma), a mountain in the Cairoma Municipality, Loayza Province, La Paz Department, Bolivia
- Achachi Qala (Ingavi), a mountain in the Ingavi Province, La Paz Department, Bolivia
- Achachi Qala (Loayza), a mountain in the Luribay Municipality, Loayza Province, La Paz Department, Bolivia
- Achachi Qala (Murillo), a mountain in the Murillo Province, La Paz Department, Bolivia
