= Nasa Q'ara (Loayza) =

Mountain in Bolivia

- Location within Bolivia

Highest point
- Elevation: 4,240 m (13,910 ft)
- Coordinates: 17°08′38″S 67°31′29″W

Geography
- Location: Bolivia; La Paz Department, Loayza Province, Luribay Municipality
- Parent range: Andes

Nasa Q'ara (Aymara nasa nose, q'ara bare, bald, "bare-nosed", also spelled Nasacara) is a mountain in the Bolivian Andes which reaches a height of approximately 4,240 m (13,910 ft). It is located in the La Paz Department, Loayza Province, Luribay Municipality. Nasa Q'ara lies northwest of Llawlli Pata and southeast of Jisk'a Uma.
