= Wallatani Lake =

Wallatani
- Location within Bolivia Location within South America
- Interactive map of Wallatani
- Location: Bolivia, La Paz Department, Inquisivi Province, Quime Municipality
- Coordinates: 17°00′30″S 67°20′50″W
- Type: Mountain lake
- Surface elevation: 4,939 m (16,204 ft)

Wallatani (Aymara wallata snow ball, snow lump / Andean goose, -ni a suffix to indicate ownership, "the one with a snow ball", "the one with a snow lump" or "the one with the Andean goose", hispanicized spelling Huallatani) is a lake in the Bolivian Andes situated in the southern section of the Cordillera Kimsa Cruz. It is situated 4,939 m high at the foot of the mountains Wallatani and San Luis (5,620 m), near Jach'a Khunu Qullu and Wayna Khunu Qullu in the La Paz Department, Inquisivi Province, Quime Municipality.

It is the highest body of water on which anyone has ever sailed, after Peter Williams, Brian Barrett, Gordon Siddeley and Keith Robinson did so on November 19, 1977.

== See also ==
- Ch'uxña Quta
- Itapalluni
- Janq'u Qullu
- Laram Quta
