= Turini =

Mountain in Bolivia

- Location within Bolivia

Highest point
- Elevation: 5,120 m (16,800 ft)
- Coordinates: 16°48′24″S 67°30′30″W

Geography
- Location: Bolivia; La Paz Department, Loayza Province
- Parent range: Andes

Turini (Aymara turi tower, -ni a suffix, "the one with a tower", also spelled Torrini) is a mountain in the Bolivian Andes which reaches a height of approximately 5,120 m (16,800 ft). It is located in the La Paz Department, Loayza Province, Cairoma Municipality, and in the Inquisivi Province, Quime Municipality. Turini lies northeast of Taruja Umaña and the lake named Warus Quta
