= Chullpani =

Mountain in Bolivia

- Location within Bolivia

Highest point
- Elevation: 3,900 m (12,800 ft)
- Coordinates: 17°07′28″S 67°33′01″W

Geography
- Location: Bolivia; La Paz Department
- Parent range: Andes

Chullpani (Aymara chullpa an ancient funerary building, -ni a suffix, "the one with chullpa constructions") is a mountain in the Bolivian Andes which reaches a height of approximately 3,900 m (12,800 ft). It is located in the La Paz Department, Loayza Province, Luribay Municipality. Chullpani lies northeast of Ch'apini.
