= Ch'api Qullu (La Paz) =

Mountain in Bolivia

- Location within Bolivia

Highest point
- Elevation: 3,478 m (11,411 ft)
- Coordinates: 17°03′16″S 67°34′55″W

Geography
- Location: Bolivia; La Paz Department
- Parent range: Andes

Ch'api Qullu (Aymara ch'api thorn, qullu mountain, "thorn mountain", also spelled Chapi Khollu, Chapi Kkollu) is a 3,478-metre-high (11,411 ft) mountain in the Bolivian Andes. It is located in the La Paz Department, Loayza Province, Luribay Municipality. Ch'api Qullu lies northeast of Jach'a Ch'uñu Uma.
