= Ch'amak Qullu =

Mountain in Bolivia

- Location within Bolivia

Highest point
- Elevation: 5,350 m (17,550 ft)
- Coordinates: 16°56′00″S 67°22′57″W

Geography
- Location: Bolivia
- Parent range: Andes, Kimsa Cruz mountain range

Ch'amak Qullu (Aymara ch'amak dark, qullu mountain, "dark mountain", Hispanicized spelling Chamac Collo) is a mountain in the Bolivian Andes, about 5,350 metres (17,552 ft) high. It lies in the Kimsa Cruz mountain range south east of the mountain Yaypuri. It is situated in the La Paz Department, Inquisivi Province, Quime Municipality, west of Chatamarka Lake.

== See also ==
- List of mountains in the Andes
