= Janq'u Willk'i =

Janq'u Willk'i (Aymara janq'u white, willk'i gap, "white gap", also spelled Janco Huilque, Janko Huilque, Jankho Willkhi) may refer to:

- Janq'u Willk'i (Cairoma), a mountain in the Cairoma Municipality, Loayza Province, La Paz Department, Bolivia
- Janq'u Willk'i (Luribay), a mountain in the Luribay Municipality, Loayza Province, La Paz Department, Bolivia
- Janq'u Willk'i (Oruro), a mountain on the border of the Mejillones Province and the Sabaya Province, Oruro Department, Bolivia
- Janq'u Willk'i (Sajama), a mountain in the Sajama Province, Oruro Department, Bolivia
