= Janq'u Quta (Inquisivi) =

Mountain in Bolivia

- Location within Bolivia

Highest point
- Elevation: 5,090 m (16,700 ft)
- Coordinates: 16°50′01″S 67°28′13″W

Geography
- Location: Bolivia; La Paz Department, Loayza Province
- Parent range: Andes, Kimsa Cruz

Janq'u Quta (Aymara janq'u, white, quta lake, "white lake", also spelled Jankho Khota) is a 5,090-metre (16,699 ft) mountain in the Kimsa Cruz mountain range in the Andes of Bolivia. It is situated in the La Paz Department, Inquisivi Province, Quime Municipality. Janq'u Quta lies south-east of the mountain Mama Uqllu.
