= Qutani =

Mountain in Bolivia

- Location within Bolivia

Highest point
- Elevation: 3,740 m (12,270 ft)
- Coordinates: 17°02′05″S 67°42′25″W

Geography
- Location: Bolivia; La Paz Department, Loayza Province
- Parent range: Andes

Qutani (Aymara quta lake, -ni a suffix, "the one with a lake", also spelled Khotani) is a mountain in the Bolivian Andes which reaches a height of approximately 3,740 m (12,270 ft). It is located in the La Paz Department, Loayza Province, Luribay Municipality, northwest of Luribay. Qutani lies southeast of Wila Quta.
