= Itapalluni =

Mountain in Bolivia

- Location within Bolivia

Highest point
- Elevation: 5,000 m (16,000 ft)
- Coordinates: 17°01′39″S 67°23′48″W

Geography
- Location: Bolivia
- Parent range: Andes

Itapalluni (Aymara itapallu nettle, -ni a suffix to indicate ownership, "the one with a nettle") is a mountain located in the Bolivian Andes, about 5,000 metres (16,404 ft) high. It is situated in the La Paz Department, Loayza Province, Malla Municipality, south-west of Wallatani Lake and the mountain Ch'uxña Quta of the Kimsa Cruz mountain range.

== See also ==
- List of mountains in the Andes
