= Laram Qullu =

Mountain in Bolivia

- Location within Bolivia

Highest point
- Elevation: 4,520 m (14,830 ft)
- Coordinates: 17°11′25″S 67°42′06″W

Geography
- Location: Bolivia; La Paz Department
- Parent range: Andes

Laram Qullu (Aymara larama blue, qullu mountain, "blue mountain", also spelled Laran Kkollu) is a mountain in the Bolivian Andes which reaches a height of approximately 4,520 m (14,830 ft). It is located in the La Paz Department, Loayza Province, Luribay Municipality. Laram Qullu lies northeast of Chuqi Sillani.
