= León Jiwata =

Mountain in Bolivia

Highest point
- Elevation: 5,680 m (18,640 ft)

Geography
- Location: Bolivia
- Parent range: Andes, Kimsa Cruz mountain range

León Jiwata (Spanish león lion (here referring to the puma), Aymara jiwata dead, "dead lion", Hispanicized spelling León Jihuata) is a mountain in the Bolivian Andes, about 5,680 metres (18,635 ft) high. It lies in the Kimsa Cruz mountain range between the mountain Yaypuri in the north west and Jach'a Khunu Qullu in the south east, south east of Mount San Enrique. It is situated in the La Paz Department, Inquisivi Province, Quime Municipality.

== See also ==
- List of mountains in the Andes
