= Q'ara Qullu (Loayza) =

Mountain in Bolivia

- Location within Bolivia

Highest point
- Elevation: 4,930 m (16,170 ft)
- Coordinates: 17°09′03″S 67°46′00″W

Geography
- Location: Bolivia; La Paz Department, Loayza Province
- Parent range: Andes

Q'ara Qullu (Aymara q'ara bare, bald, qullu mountain, "bare mountain", also spelled Khara Khollu, Khara Kkollu) is a 4,930 m (16,170 ft) mountain in the Bolivian Andes. It is located in the La Paz Department, Loayza Province, Luribay Municipality. Q'ara Qullu lies southwest of Suka Sukani, northwest of Urqu Jipiña and southeast of K'ark'ani. The little lake northwest of Q'ara Qullu is Wila Quta ("red lake").
