= Caxata =

Coordinates: 17°08′S 67°20′W

- Town
- Interactive map of Caxata
- Country: Bolivia
- Department: La Paz Department
- Province: Loayza Province
- Municipality: Yaco Municipality
- Time zone: UTC-4 (BOT)

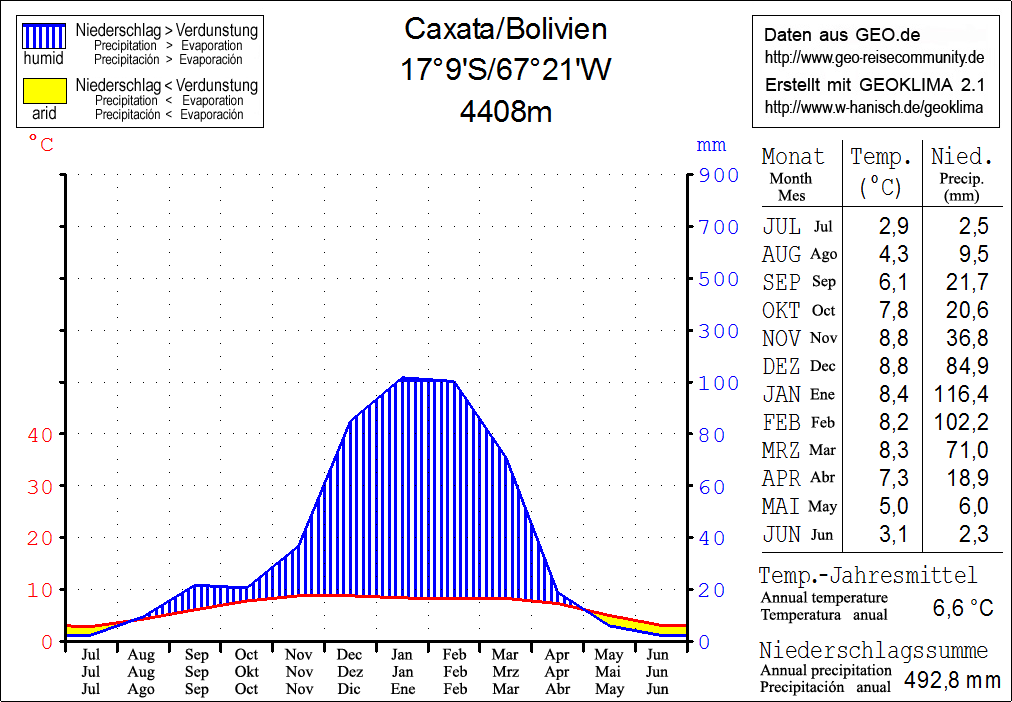
Caxata Climate chart

Caxata is a small town in Bolivia. In 2001, it had an estimated population of 317.
