= Jisk'a Uma =

Mountain in Bolivia

- Location within Bolivia

Highest point
- Elevation: 3,940 m (12,930 ft)
- Coordinates: 17°08′25″S 67°32′29″W

Geography
- Location: Bolivia; La Paz Department, Loayza Province, Luribay Municipality
- Parent range: Andes

Jisk'a Uma (Aymara jisk'a small, uma water, "little water", also spelled Jiskha Uma) is a mountain in the Bolivian Andes which reaches a height of approximately 3,940 m (12,930 ft). It is located in the La Paz Department, Loayza Province, Luribay Municipality. Jisk'a Uma lies northwest of Nasa Q'ara and southeast of Ch'apini.
