= Achuma (Bolivia) =

Mountain in Bolivia

- Location within Bolivia

Highest point
- Elevation: 4,960 m (16,270 ft)
- Coordinates: 16°47′26″S 67°31′51″W

Geography
- Location: Bolivia; La Paz Department, Loayza Province
- Parent range: Andes, Kimsa Cruz

Achuma (Aymara for large cactus plants such as Echinopsis lageniformis, Echinopsis pachanoi or other species, also the name of a drink, also spelled Achoma) is a mountain in the northern part of the Kimsa Cruz mountain range in the Bolivian Andes, about 4,960 metres (16,273 ft) high. It is situated in the La Paz Department, Loayza Province, Cairoma Municipality. The peaks of Achuma lie north-west to north of the mountain Taruja Umaña and south of Janq'u Willk'i. There are two small lakes north of the mountain. They are named Allqa Quta ("two-colored lake", Alca Kkota) and Ch'iyar Quta ("black lake", Chiar Kkota).
