= Lawrani =

Mountain in Bolivia

- Location within Bolivia

Highest point
- Elevation: 4,024 m (13,202 ft)
- Coordinates: 17°02′50″S 67°38′25″W

Geography
- Location: Bolivia; La Paz Department, Loayza Province
- Parent range: Andes

Lawrani (Aymara lawra a kind of fish, -ni a suffix, "the one with the lawra fish", also spelled Laurani) is a 4,024-metre-high (13,202 ft) mountain in the Bolivian Andes. It is located in the La Paz Department, Loayza Province, Luribay Municipality, northeast of Luribay.
