= Sapahaqui =

Location in the La Paz Department in Bolivia

Sapahaqui Sapa Jaqhi
- Town
- Location within Bolivia
- Coordinates: 16°53′S 67°57′W
- Country: Bolivia
- Department: La Paz Department
- Province: José Ramón Loayza Province
- Municipality: Sapahaqui Municipality

Population (2001)
  - Total: 219
- Time zone: UTC-4 (BOT)

Sapahaqui or Sapa Jaqhi (Aymara) is location in the La Paz Department in Bolivia. It is the seat of the Sapahaqui Municipality, the second municipal section of the José Ramón Loayza Province.

== See also ==
- Pichaqani
