= T'ula T'ulani =

Mountain in Bolivia

- Location within Bolivia

Highest point
- Elevation: 4,900 m (16,100 ft)
- Coordinates: 17°01′17″S 67°24′59″W

Geography
- Location: Bolivia, La Paz Department, Loayza Province, Malla Municipality
- Parent range: Andes

T'ula T'ulani (Aymara t'ula wood, burning material, the reduplication indicates that there is a group of something, -ni a suffix to indicate ownership, "the one with a lot of wood (or burning material)", also spelled Thola Tholani) is a mountain in the La Paz Department in the Andes of Bolivia which reaches a height of approximately 4,900 m (16,100 ft). It is located in the Loayza Province, Malla Municipality, southwest of Turi Turini and northwest of Itapalluni.
