= Janq'u Qala (La Paz) =

Mountain in Bolivia

- Location within Bolivia

Highest point
- Elevation: 3,900 m (12,800 ft)
- Coordinates: 17°04′54″S 67°34′12″W

Geography
- Location: Bolivia; La Paz Department
- Parent range: Andes

Janq'u Qala (Aymara janq'u white, qala stone, "white stone", also spelled Jankho Khala) is a mountain in the Bolivian Andes which reaches a height of approximately 3,900 m (12,800 ft). It is located in the La Paz Department, Loayza Province, Luribay Municipality. Janq'u Qala lies southeast of Jach'a Ch'uñu Uma and Mula Jalanta.
