= Ch'iyar Quta =

Ch'iyar Quta (Aymara ch'iyara black, quta lake, "black lake", also spelled Chiar Khota, Chiar Kkota, Chiar Kota, Chiar Quota, Chiarcota, Chiarkhota, Chiarkkota) may refer to:

== Lakes ==
- Ch'iyar Quta, Nor Lípez in the Nor Lípez Province, Potosí Department, Bolivia
- Ch'iyar Quta, La Paz in the Pucarani Municipality, Los Andes Province, La Paz Department, Bolivia
- Ch'iyar Quta, Oruro in the Curahuara de Carangas Municipality, Sajama Province, Oruro Department, Bolivia

== Mountain ==
- Ch'iyar Quta (Loayza), a mountain in the Loayza Province, La Paz Department, Bolivia
