= Wisk'achani (Luribay) =

Mountain in Bolivia

- Location within Bolivia

Highest point
- Elevation: 4,040 m (13,250 ft)
- Coordinates: 17°05′38″S 67°41′34″W

Geography
- Location: Bolivia; La Paz Department, Loayza Province, Luribay Municipality
- Parent range: Andes

Wisk'achani (Aymara wisk'acha a rodent,-ni a suffix to indicate ownership, "the one with the viscacha", hispanicized spelling Viscachani) is a mountain in the Bolivian Andes which reaches a height of approximately 4,040 m (13,250 ft). It is located in the La Paz Department, Loayza Province, Luribay Municipality.
