= Janq'u Qala =

Janq'u Qala (Aymara janq'u white, qala stone, "white stone", also spelled Anccocala, Ancocala, Anccoccala, Janko Cala, Jankho Khala, Janko Kala) may refer to:

- Janq'u Qala (Cochabamba), a mountain in the Cochabamba Department, Bolivia
- Janq'u Qala (La Paz), a mountain in the La Paz Department, Bolivia
- Janq'u Qala Lake, a lake in the La Paz Department, Bolivia
- Janq'u Qala (Peru), a mountain in Peru

== See also ==
- Janq'u Qullu (disambiguation)
