= Chuqi Tira =

Mountain in Bolivia

- Location within Bolivia

Highest point
- Elevation: 4,000 m (13,000 ft)
- Coordinates: 17°02′11″S 67°30′45″W

Geography
- Location: Bolivia; La Paz Department, Loayza Province
- Parent range: Andes

Chuqi Tira (Aymara chuqi gold, tira cradle, "gold cradle", also spelled Choquetira) is a mountain in the Bolivian Andes which reaches a height of approximately 4,000 m (13,000 ft). It is located in the La Paz Department, Loayza Province, Malla Municipality. Chuqi Tira lies southeast of Pukarani. The Malla Jawira flows along its southern and south-western slopes.
