= Lluxita (La Paz) =

Mountain in Bolivia

- Location within Bolivia

Highest point
- Elevation: 4,000 m (13,000 ft)
- Coordinates: 17°03′30″S 67°32′50″W

Geography
- Location: Bolivia; La Paz Department
- Parent range: Andes

Lluxita (Aymara lluxi shell of a mussel; landslide, -ta a suffix, also spelled Llojeta) is a mountain in the Bolivian Andes which reaches a height of approximately 4,000 m (13,000 ft). It is located in the La Paz Department, Loayza Province, Luribay Municipality. Lluxita lies northwest of Jach'a Walluni and Turini, east of the village of Capilla Santa Cruz. The Malla Jawira flows along its slopes.
