= Turini (disambiguation) =

Turini (Aymara turi tower, -ni a suffix, "the one with the tower", also spelled Torini, Torrini, Turrini) may refer to:

- Turini, a mountain on the border of the Inquisivi Province and the Loayza Province, La Paz Department, Bolivia
- Turini (Ingavi), a mountain in the Ingavi Province, La Paz Department, Bolivia
- Turini (Larecaja), a mountain in the Larecaja Province, La Paz Department, Bolivia
- Turini (Loayza), a mountain in the Loayza Province, La Paz Department, Bolivia
- Turini (Murillo), a mountain in the Murillo Province, La Paz Department, Bolivia
- Turini (Potosí), a mountain in the Potosí Department, Bolivia
- Turini (Sud Yungas), a mountain in the Sud Yungas Province, La Paz Department, Bolivia
- Norbert Turini, French Catholic bishop

== See also ==
- Torrini (disambiguation)
