= Janq'u Jaqhi =

Janq'u Jaqhi (Aymara janq'u white, jaqhi precipice, cliff, "white cliff", also spelled Janco Jaque, Jankho Jakke, Jankko Jakke, Jancojake, Jancojaque) may refer to:

- Janq'u Jaqhi (Aroma), a mountain in the Aroma Province, La Paz Department, Bolivia
- Janq'u Jaqhi (Ingavi), a mountain in the Ingavi Province, La Paz Department, Bolivia
- Janq'u Jaqhi (Loayza), a mountain in the Loayza Province, La Paz Department, Bolivia
- Janq'u Jaqhi (Oruro), a mountain in the Sajama Province, Oruro Department, Bolivia
- Janq'u Jaqhi (Totora), a mountain in the San Pedro de Totora Province, Oruro Department, Bolivia
