= Jach'a Qullu (Loayza) =

Mountain in Bolivia

- Location within Bolivia

Highest point
- Elevation: 4,390 m (14,400 ft)
- Coordinates: 17°02′26″S 67°28′15″W

Geography
- Location: Bolivia; La Paz Department, Loayza Province
- Parent range: Andes

Jach'a Qullu (Aymara jach'a big, qullu mountain, "big mountain", also spelled Jachcha Khollo) is a 4,390-metre-high (14,403 ft) mountain in the Bolivian Andes. It is located in the La Paz Department, Loayza Province, Malla Municipality. Jach'a Qullu is situated south-west of the mountains Wila Willk'i, Malla Qullu and Janq'u Qalani (Jankho Khalani). It lies west of Malla. The river Jach'a K'uchu Jawira ("big corner river", Jachcha Khuchu Jahuira) flows along the northern slopes of Jach'a Qullu.
