= Chucamarca =

Coordinates: 17°05′S 67°28′W

- Town
- Interactive map of Chucamarca
- Country: Bolivia
- Department: La Paz Department
- Province: Loayza Province
- Municipality: Yaco Municipality
- Time zone: UTC-4 (BOT)

Chucamarca is a small town in Bolivia. In 2009 it had an estimated population of 991.
