= Janq'u Qullu (disambiguation) =

Janq'u Qullu is a mountain at the border of the provinces of Inquisivi and Loayza, La Paz Department, Bolivia.

Janq'u Qullu (white mountain) may also refer to:

- Janq'u Qullu (Oruro), a mountain in the Oruro Department, Bolivia
- Janq'u Qullu (Pando), a mountain in the José Manuel Pando Province, La Paz Department, Bolivia
- Janq'u Qullu (Potosí), a mountain in the Potosí Department, Bolivia

== See also ==
- Janq'u Qala (disambiguation)
