= Quri Ch'uma =

Mountain in Bolivia

- Inmaculado
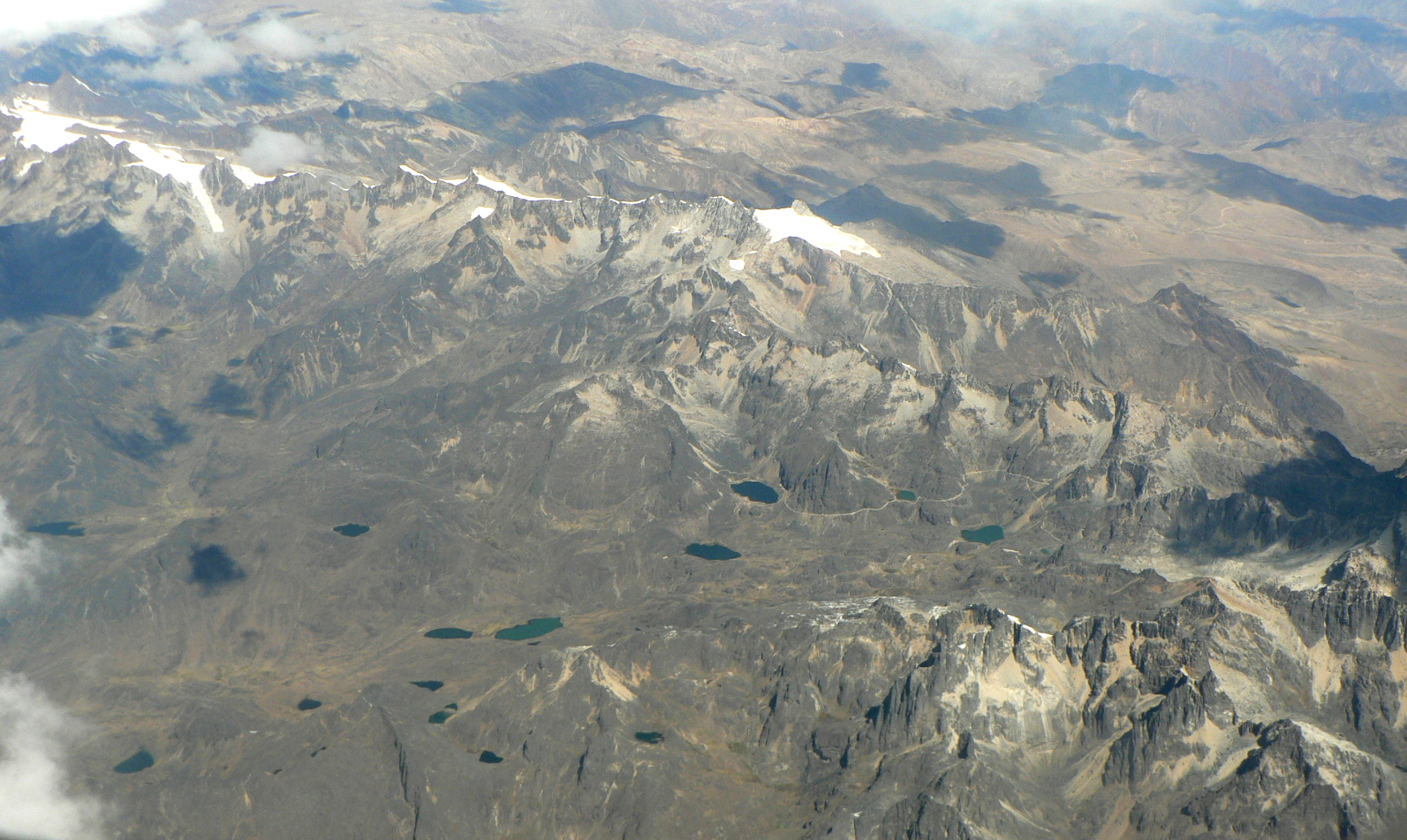
- Aerial view of Quri Ch'uma (upper center). (North is to the lower part of this image.)

Highest point
- Elevation: 5,312 m (17,428 ft)
- Coordinates: 16°53′45″S 67°27′6″W

Geography
- Location within Bolivia
- Location: Bolivia
- Parent range: Andes, Kimsa Cruz

Climbing
- First ascent: 1-1911

Quri Ch'uma (Aymara quri gold, ch'uma filtering, "gold filtering", also spelled Corichuma, Corri Chuma, Khori Chuma, Korichuma), also named Inmaculado, is a mountain in the Kimsa Cruz mountain range in the Bolivian Andes, about 5,312 metres (17,428 ft) high. It is situated in the La Paz Department, at the border of the Inquisivi Province, Quime Municipality, and the Loayza Province, Cairoma Municipality and Malla Municipality. Quri Ch'uma lies south of Salvador Apachita and northwest of Yaypuri.

== See also ==
- Mama Uqllu
- List of mountains in the Andes
