= Turi Turini =

Turi Turini (Aymara turi tower, the reduplication indicates that there is a group of something, -ni a suffix, "the one with a group of towers", also spelled Tori Torini, Torri Torrini, Turri Turrini) may refer to:

- Turi Turini (Cochabamba), a mountain in the Cochabamba Department, Bolivia
- Turi Turini (La Paz), a mountain northwest of Mallachuma in the Malla Municipality, Loayza Province, La Paz Department, Bolivia
- Turi Turini (Malla), a mountain southwest of Mallachuma in the Malla Municipality, Loayza Province, La Paz Department, Bolivia
- Turi Turini (Oruro), a mountain in the Oruro Department, Bolivia
