= Jach'a Wayllani =

Mountain in Bolivia

- Location within Bolivia

Highest point
- Elevation: 4,140 m (13,580 ft)
- Coordinates: 17°05′54″S 67°31′16″W

Geography
- Location: Bolivia; La Paz Department
- Parent range: Andes

Jach'a Wayllani (Aymara jach'a big, waylla Stipa obtusa, a kind of feather grass, -ni a suffix, "the big one with Stipa obtusa", also spelled Jachcha Huayllani) is a mountain in the Bolivian Andes which reaches a height of approximately 4,140 m (13,580 ft). It is located in the La Paz Department, Loayza Province, Luribay Municipality. Jach'a Wayllani lies southeast of Jach'a Walluni and Tani Tani.
