= Qullpani (Loayza) =

Mountain in Bolivia

- Location within Bolivia

Highest point
- Elevation: 3,660 m (12,010 ft)
- Coordinates: 17°02′05″S 67°37′56″W

Geography
- Location: Bolivia; La Paz Department, Loayza Province
- Parent range: Andes

Qullpani (Aymara qullpa saltpeter, -ni a suffix, "the one with saltpeter", also spelled Kollpani) is a mountain in the Bolivian Andes which reaches a height of approximately 3,660 m (12,010 ft). It is located in the La Paz Department, Loayza Province, Luribay Municipality, northeast of Luribay.
