= Liqiliqini (La Paz) =

Mountain in Bolivia

- Location within Bolivia

Highest point
- Elevation: 3,928 m (12,887 ft)
- Coordinates: 16°52′41″S 67°35′51″W

Geography
- Location: Bolivia; La Paz Department
- Parent range: Andes

Liqiliqini (Aymara liqiliqi, liqi liqi Southern lapwing or Andean lapwing,-ni a suffix to indicate ownership, "the one with the Southern lapwing (or Andean lapwing)", also spelled Leke Lekeni, Lekelekeni) is a 3,928-metre-high (12,887 ft) mountain in the Bolivian Andes. It is located in the La Paz Department, Loayza Province, Cairoma Municipality, southwest of the village of Wila Pampa. Liqiliqini lies northwest of Wayra Willk'i, Wanuni and Uyuyuni.
