= Warus Quta (Loayza) =

Lake in Bolivia

- Location within Bolivia
- Interactive map of Warus Quta
- Location: La Paz Department, Loayza Province, Bolivia
- Coordinates: 16°49′02″S 67°31′02″W
- Basin countries: Bolivia

Warus Quta (Aymara warusa grey-brown, quta lake, "grey-brown lake", also spelled Barrus Kkota) is a lake in the Kimsa Cruz mountain range in the Andes of Bolivia. It is situated in the La Paz Department, Loayza Province, Cairoma Municipality. Warus Quta lies between the mountains Taruja Umaña in the west and Mama Uqllu in the east. The river Taruj Umaña originates near the lake. It flows to the west and then to the north-west as an affluent of the La Paz River.
