= Laram Quta (Inquisivi) =

Lake in La Paz Department, Bolivia

- Location within Bolivia Location within South America
- Interactive map of Laram Quta
- Location: Bolivia; La Paz Department, Inquisivi Province, Quime Municipality
- Coordinates: 16°57′42″S 67°23′17″W
- Max. length: 1.6 km (0.99 mi)
- Max. width: 0.6 km (0.37 mi)
- Surface elevation: 4,862 m (15,951 ft)

Laram Quta (Aymara larama blue, quta lake, "blue lake", Hispanicized spelling Laramcota) is a lake in Bolivia in the La Paz Department, Inquisivi Province, Quime Municipality. It lies on the western slope of the Kimsa Cruz mountain range, at the foot of the Laram Quta glacier and Mount Gigante, north west of the lake Wallatani. Laram Quta is about 1.6 km long and 0.6 km at its widest point and situated at a height of about 4,862 metres (15,951 ft).
