= Janq'u Qullu =

Mountain in Bolivia

- Location within Bolivia

Highest point
- Elevation: 5,460 m (17,910 ft)
- Coordinates: 16°59′47″S 67°19′45″W

Geography
- Location: Bolivia
- Parent range: Andes, Kimsa Cruz mountain range

Climbing
- First ascent: 1989, Evelio Echevarría

Janq'u Qullu (Aymara janq'u white, qullu mountain, "white mountain", Hispanicized spelling Anco Collo) is a mountain in the Bolivian Andes, about 5,460 metres (17,913 ft) high. The mountaineer Evelio Echevarría described it as a pure white mountain. It lies in the Kimsa Cruz mountain range near Wallatani Lake. It is situated in the La Paz Department, at the border of Inquisivi Province and Loayza Province, south east of the mountains Jach'a Khunu Qullu, Wayna Khunu Qullu and San Luis.

== See also ==
- List of mountains in the Andes
