= Ch'utu Qullu =

Mountain in Bolivia

- Location within Bolivia

Highest point
- Elevation: 3,820 m (12,530 ft)
- Coordinates: 17°09′21″S 67°39′45″W

Geography
- Location: Bolivia; La Paz Department, Loayza Province
- Parent range: Andes

Ch'utu Qullu (Aymara ch'utu peak of a mountain, top of the head, qullu mountain, also spelled Chutu Khollu) is a mountain in the Bolivian Andes which reaches a height of approximately 3,820 m (12,530 ft). It is located in the La Paz Department, Loayza Province, Luribay Municipality, southeast of Janchallani.
