= Wanuni =

Mountain in Bolivia

- Location within Bolivia

Highest point
- Elevation: 4,148 m (13,609 ft)
- Coordinates: 16°53′28″S 67°34′25″W

Geography
- Location: Bolivia; La Paz Department, Loayza Province
- Parent range: Andes

Wanuni (Aymara wanu dung, fertilizer, -ni a suffix, "the one with dung", also spelled Huanuni) is a 4,148-metre-high (13,609 ft) mountain in the Bolivian Andes. It is located in the La Paz Department, Loayza Province, Cairoma Municipality, northwest of Cairoma. Wanuni lies southwest of Llallawa, northwest of Wayra Willk'i and southeast of Liqiliqini.
