= Wila Quta (Loayza) =

Mountain in Bolivia

- Location within Bolivia

Highest point
- Elevation: 4,100 m (13,500 ft)
- Coordinates: 17°00′52″S 67°42′44″W

Geography
- Location: Bolivia; La Paz Department, Loayza Province
- Parent range: Andes

Wila Quta (Aymara wila blood, blood-red, quta lake, "red lake", also spelled Wila Khota, Wila Kkota) is a mountain in the Bolivian Andes which reaches a height of approximately 4,100 m (13,500 ft). It is located in the La Paz Department, Loayza Province, Sapahaqui Municipality, at the border with the Luribay Municipality. Wila Quta lies northwest of Qutani.
