= Chuqisa =

Mountain in Bolivia

- Location within Bolivia

Highest point
- Elevation: 3,300 m (10,800 ft)
- Coordinates: 17°00′46″S 67°35′32″W

Geography
- Location: Bolivia; La Paz Department, Loayza Province
- Parent range: Andes

Chuqisa (Aymara, also spelled Choquesa) is a mountain in the Bolivian Andes which reaches a height of approximately 3,300 m (10,800 ft). It is located in the La Paz Department, Loayza Province, Luribay Municipality. Chuqisa lies southwest of a village of that name and west of Janq'u Willk'i.
