= Pukarani (La Paz) =

Mountain in Bolivia

- Location within Bolivia

Highest point
- Elevation: 3,720 m (12,200 ft)
- Coordinates: 17°01′48″S 67°31′07″W

Geography
- Location: Bolivia; La Paz Department, Loayza Province
- Parent range: Andes

Pukarani (Aymara pukara fortress, -ni a suffix, "the one with a fortress", also spelled Pucarani) is a mountain in the Bolivian Andes which reaches a height of approximately 3,720 m (12,200 ft). It is located in the La Paz Department, Loayza Province, Malla Municipality. Pukarani lies northwest of Chuqi Tira. The Malla Jawira flows along its south-western slopes.
