= Lluxita =

Lluxita (Aymara lluxi shell of a mussel; landslide, -ta a suffix, also spelled Llojeta, Llojita, Lloqueta, Lluquita) may refer to:

- Lluxita (Cochabamba), a mountain in the Cochabamba Department, Bolivia
- Lluxita (La Paz), a mountain in the La Paz Department, Bolivia
- Lluxita (Potosí), a mountain in the Potosí Department, Bolivia
