= Wallatani (Bolivia) =

Mountain in Bolivia

- Location within Bolivia

Highest point
- Elevation: 5,336 m (17,507 ft)
- Coordinates: 17°00′39″S 67°21′41″W

Geography
- Location: Bolivia; La Paz Department
- Parent range: Andes, Kimsa Cruz

Wallatani (Aymara wallata snow ball, snow lump / Andean goose, -ni a suffix to indicate ownership, "the one with a snow ball", "the one with a snow lump" or "the one with the Andean goose", Hispanicized spelling Huallatani) is a 5,336-metre-high (17,507 ft) mountain in the west of the Kimsa Cruz mountain range in the Bolivian Andes. It is situated in the La Paz Department, Loayza Province, Malla Municipality. Wallatani lies west of Wallatani Lake and southeast of the mountain Ch'uxña Quta.

== See also ==
- List of mountains in the Andes
