= Qillwan Quta =

Mountain in Bolivia

- Location within Bolivia

Highest point
- Elevation: 4,826 m (15,833 ft)
- Coordinates: 17°11′11″S 67°44′24″W

Geography
- Location: Bolivia; La Paz Department
- Parent range: Andes

Qillwan Quta (Aymara qillwa, qiwña, qiwlla Andean gull, -n(i) a suffix, quta lake, "lake with gulls", also spelled Kellhuan Khota, Kellhuan Kkota) is a 4,826-metre-high (15,833 ft) mountain in the Bolivian Andes. It is located in the La Paz Department, Loayza Province, Luribay Municipality. Qillwan Quta lies northwest of Chuqi Sillani at a plain named Qillwan Quta Pampa.
