= Janq'u Jaqhi (Loayza) =

Mountain in Bolivia

- Location within Bolivia

Highest point
- Elevation: 3,400 m (11,200 ft)
- Coordinates: 16°57′23″S 67°37′39″W

Geography
- Location: Bolivia; La Paz Department, Loayza Province
- Parent range: Andes

Janq'u Jaqhi (Aymara janq'u white, jaqhi precipice, cliff, "white cliff", also spelled Jankho Jakke) is a mountain in the Bolivian Andes which reaches a height of approximately 3,400 m (11,200 ft). It is located in the La Paz Department, Loayza Province, Luribay Municipality. It lies northeast of Jukumarini and southeast of Sawaya.
