= Wiluqu =

Mountain in Bolivia

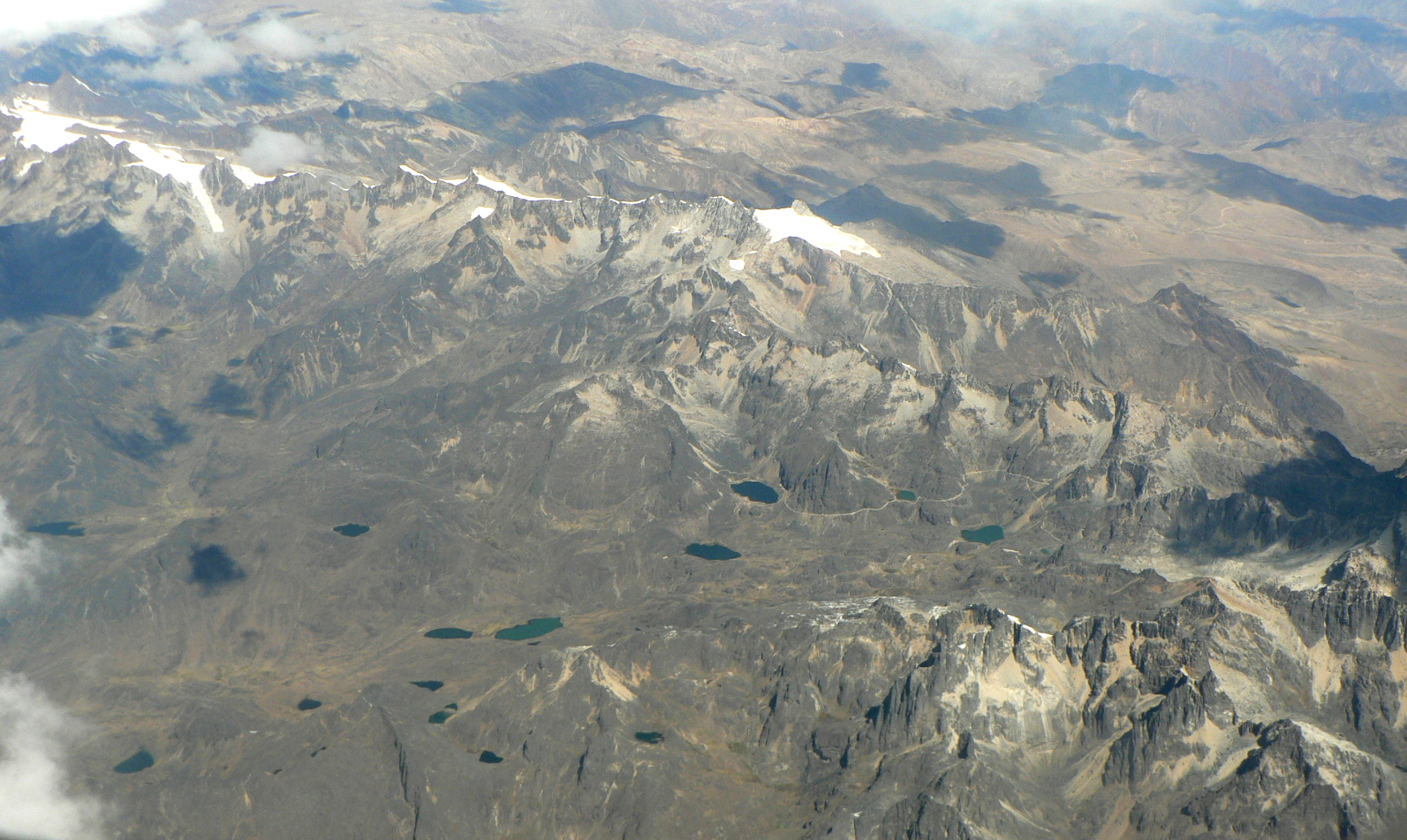
- Aerial view of Wiluqu (on the right). (North is to the lower part of this image.)

Highest point
- Elevation: 4,700 m (15,400 ft)
- Coordinates: 16°53′24″S 67°29′21″W

Geography
- Location within Bolivia
- Location: Bolivia; La Paz Department
- Parent range: Andes

Wiluqu (Aymara for a kind of bird, also spelled Viloco) is a mountain in the Bolivian Andes which reaches a height of approximately 4,700 m (15,400 ft). It is located in the La Paz Department, Loayza Province, Cairoma Municipality.
