= Wila Willk'i (La Paz) =

Mountain in Bolivia

- Location within Bolivia

Highest point
- Elevation: 4,630 m (15,190 ft)
- Coordinates: 17°00′42″S 67°27′39″W

Geography
- Location: Bolivia; La Paz Department, Loayza Province
- Parent range: Andes

Wila Willk'i (Aymara wila blood, red, willk'i gap, "red gap", also spelled Wila Willkhi, Wila Willki) is a 4,630-metre-high (15,190 ft) mountain in the Bolivian Andes. It is located in the La Paz Department, Loayza Province, Malla Municipality. Wila Willk'i is situated northwest of Malla and a mountain named Malla Qullu.

The Jach'a K'uchu Jawira ("big corner river", Jachcha Khuchu Jahuira) and the Wila Jawira ("red river", Wila Jahuira) originate northeast and east of the mountain. They flow to the southwest. The Wila Jawira is an affluent of the Malla Jawira.
