= Wila Willk'i (Cairoma) =

Mountain in Bolivia

- Location within Bolivia

Highest point
- Elevation: 4,080 m (13,390 ft)
- Coordinates: 16°55′12″S 67°37′00″W

Geography
- Location: Bolivia; La Paz Department, Loayza Province, Cairoma Municipality
- Parent range: Andes

Wila Willk'i (Aymara wila blood, blood-red, willk'i gap, "red gap", also spelled Wila Willkhi) is a mountain in the Bolivian Andes which reaches a height of approximately 480 m (1,570 ft). It is located in the La Paz Department, Loayza Province, Cairoma Municipality. This is where the Wila Willk'i Jawira (Aymara jawira "river") originates. It flows to the northwest as an affluent of the Luribay River.
