= Pukara (Loayza) =

Mountain in Bolivia

- Location within Bolivia

Highest point
- Elevation: 3,908 m (12,822 ft)
- Coordinates: 16°57′05″S 67°54′42″W

Geography
- Location: Bolivia; La Paz Department, Loayza Province
- Parent range: Andes

Pukara (Aymara for fortress, Hispanicized spelling Pucara) is a 3,908-metre-high (12,822 ft) mountain in the Bolivian Andes. It lies in the La Paz Department, Loayza Province, Sapahaqui Municipality.
