= Jach'a Tira (Bolivia) =

Mountain in Bolivia

- Location within Bolivia

Highest point
- Elevation: 4,440 m (14,570 ft)
- Coordinates: 17°05′30″S 67°20′53″W

Geography
- Location: Bolivia, La Paz Department
- Parent range: Andes

Jach'a Tira (Aymara jach'a big, tira cradle, "big cradle", also spelled Jachcha Tira) is a mountain in the La Paz Department in the Andes of Bolivia which reaches a height of approximately 4,440 m (14,570 ft). It is located in the Loayza Province, Malla Municipality, northeast of the community of Bella Vista.
