= Yaco Municipality =

Coordinates: 17.25°S 67.4167°W

- Municipality
- Interactive map of Yaco Municipality
- Country: Bolivia
- Department: La Paz Department
- Province: Loayza Province
- Seat: Yaco
- Time zone: UTC-4 (BOT)

Yaco Municipality is the third municipal section of the Loayza Province in the La Paz Department, Bolivia. Its seat is Yaco.

== Villages ==
In addition to Yaco, the municipality comprises a number of villages, among which:

- Caxata
- Chucamarca

== See also ==
- Jach'a Jawira
- Wila Pukara
- Wisk'achani
