= Janq'u Willk'i (Cairoma) =

Mountain in Bolivia

- Location within Bolivia

Highest point
- Elevation: 4,800 m (15,700 ft)
- Coordinates: 16°46′20″S 67°31′53″W

Geography
- Location: Bolivia; La Paz Department, Loayza Province
- Parent range: Andes, Kimsa Cruz

Janq'u Willk'i (Aymara janq'u white, willk'i gap, "white gap", also spelled Jankho Willkhi) is a mountain in the northern part of the Kimsa Cruz mountain range in the Bolivian Andes, about 4,800 metres (15,748 ft) high. It is situated in the La Paz Department, Loayza Province, Cairoma Municipality. Janq'u Willk'i lies north of the mountains Taruja Umaña and Achuma. There are two small lakes at the feet of Achuma and Janq'u Willk'i. They are named Allqa Quta ("two-colored lake", Alca Kkota) and Ch'iyar Quta ("black lake", Chiar Kkota).
