= Ch'iyar Quta (Loayza) =

Mountain in Bolivia

- Location within Bolivia

Highest point
- Elevation: 4,280 m (14,040 ft)
- Coordinates: 17°06′03″S 67°33′39″W

Geography
- Location: Bolivia; La Paz Department
- Parent range: Andes

Ch'iyar Quta (Aymara ch'iyara black, quta lake, "black lake", also spelled Chiar Khota, Chiar Kkota) is a mountain in the Bolivian Andes which reaches a height of approximately 4,280 m (14,040 ft). It is located in the La Paz Department, Loayza Province, Luribay Municipality. Ch'iyar Quta lies between the Ch'uñu Uma River in the north and the Ch'uñu Uma Jawira in the south which both originate southeast of the mountain. They flow to the Luribay River.
