= Kunturiri (Loayza) =

Mountain in Bolivia

- Location within Bolivia

Highest point
- Elevation: 4,572 m (15,000 ft)
- Coordinates: 17°01′18″S 67°29′23″W

Geography
- Location: Bolivia; La Paz Department, Loayza Province
- Parent range: Andes

Kunturiri (Aymara kunturi condor, -(i)ri a suffix, Hispanicized spelling Condoriri) is a 4,572-metre-high (15,000 ft) mountain in the Bolivian Andes. It is located in the La Paz Department, Loayza Province, Malla Municipality. Kunturiri is situated south-west of the mountains Wila Willk'i and Quta Qutani (Kkota Kkotani). It lies west of the village of Kunturiri (Condoriri).
