= Jach'a Qullu (Luribay) =

Mountain in Bolivia

- Location within Bolivia

Highest point
- Elevation: 4,080 m (13,390 ft)
- Coordinates: 17°07′01″S 67°33′42″W

Geography
- Location: Bolivia; La Paz Department, Loayza Province, Luribay Municipality
- Parent range: Andes

Jach'a Qullu (Aymara jach'a big, qullu mountain, "big mountain", also spelled Jachcha Khollu) is a mountain in the Bolivian Andes which reaches a height of approximately 4,080 m (13,390 ft). It is located in the La Paz Department, Loayza Province, Luribay Municipality.
