= Jukumarini (Loayza) =

Mountain in Bolivia

- Location within Bolivia

Highest point
- Elevation: 3,662 m (12,014 ft)
- Coordinates: 16°57′55″S 67°38′31″W

Geography
- Location: Bolivia; La Paz Department, Loayza Province
- Parent range: Andes

Jukumarini (Aymara jukumari bear, -ni a suffix, "the one with a bear", also spelled Jucumarini) is a 3,662-metre-high (12,014 ft) mountain in the Bolivian Andes. It is located in the La Paz Department, Loayza Province, Luribay Municipality.
