= Wayra Willk'i =

Mountain in Bolivia

- Location within Bolivia

Highest point
- Elevation: 4,100 m (13,500 ft)
- Coordinates: 16°53′54″S 67°34′12″W

Geography
- Location: Bolivia; La Paz Department, Loayza Province
- Parent range: Andes

Wayra Willk'i (Aymara wayra wind, willk'i gap, "wind gap", also spelled Huayra Willkhi) is a mountain in the Bolivian Andes which reaches a height of approximately 4,100 m (13,500 ft). It is located in the La Paz Department, Loayza Province, Cairoma Municipality, northwest of Cairoma. Wayra Willk'i lies north of Pukara Ch'utu and southeast of Wanuni.
