= Nina Qullu (La Paz) =

Mountain in La Paz, Bolivia

- Location within Bolivia

Highest point
- Elevation: 3,600 m (11,800 ft)
- Coordinates: 17°10′42″S 67°32′39″W

Geography
- Location: Bolivia; La Paz Department
- Parent range: Andes

Nina Qullu (Aymara nina fire, qullu mountain, "fire mountain", also spelled Nina Kkellu, Nina Kollu) is a mountain in the Bolivian Andes which reaches a height of approximately 3,600 m (11,800 ft). It is located in the La Paz Department, Loayza Province, Luribay Municipality. The Qullpa Jawira ("salpeter river", Khollpa Jahuira) flows along its eastern slope.
