= Achachi Qala (Loayza) =

Mountain in Bolivia

- Location within Bolivia

Highest point
- Elevation: 4,094 m (13,432 ft)
- Coordinates: 17°07′50″S 67°42′35″W

Geography
- Location: Bolivia; La Paz Department, Loayza Province
- Parent range: Andes

Achachi Qala (Aymara for "gigantic stone", also spelled Achachicala) is a 4,094-metre-high (13,432 ft) mountain in the Bolivian Andes. It is located in the La Paz Department, Loayza Province, Luribay Municipality.
