= Durga Das =

Indian journalist and author (1900–1974)

- Born: 23 November 1900; Aur, Punjab Province, British India (present-day Punjab, India)
- Died: 17 May 1974 (aged 73); New Delhi, India
- Education: Dayanand Anglo Vedic College
- Occupations: Journalist; author; social worker
- Years active: 1918–1966
- Notable work: Ram Rajya in Action (1956); India and the World (1958); India From Curzon to Nehru and After (1969)
- Spouse: Ratan Devi

Durga Das (23 November 1900 – 17 May 1974) was an Indian journalist. He was the founding president of the Press Club of India. A longtime parliamentary correspondent and editor with the Associated Press of India, he worked in several newspaper publications, including The Statesman, The Times of India and lastly the Hindustan Times, serving as its editor-in-chief from 1957 till 1959 before he went on to establish his own news agency, India News and Feature Alliance (INFA) in late 1959.

== Early life and education ==
Durga Das was born on 23 November 1900 in Aur, a village in present-day Jalandhar district in the Indian state of Punjab. He attended an Arya Samaj-run school in Jalandhar and graduated with a bachelor's degree from Dayanand Anglo Vedic College (now Government Islamia College) in late 1910s.

== Career ==
After graduating from Dayanand Anglo Vedic College, he joined the Associated Press of India in 1918 and served as its Parliamentary Correspondent till 1937. He later joined the Calcutta-based The Statesman as its Special Representative and worked there till 1943. In 1944, he joined the Hindustan Times and went on to serve as its editor-in-chief from 1957 till 1959, before taking temporary retirement to establish organisations like the Press Club of India and India News and Feature Alliance (INFA).

During his five decades long journalistic career, he interacted with numerous political figures, including Viscount Chelmsford, Louis Mountbatten, Bal Tilak, Mahatma Gandhi, Muhammad Ali Jinnah, Jawaharlal Nehru, Lal Bahadur Shastri and Indira Gandhi.

He is said to have preferred Vallabhbhai Patel, not Nehru, to become the first Prime Minister of India. He had authored three books, Ram Rajya in Action (1956), India and the World (1958) and India From Curzon to Nehru and After (1969). The book India From Curzon to Nehru and After has been described as "reporter's fiction" and that it relies "on gossip, not history".

== Personal life ==
Das was married to Ratan Devi, and they had four sons and two daughters. He liked playing tennis and enjoyed swimming.

== Death and legacy ==
Durga Das died on 17 May 1974 due to cardiac arrest in New Delhi, India. The then Prime Minister Indira Gandhi sent condolences to his family. President V. V. Giri also sent condolences and described him as "one of my best friends in life" and a "great journalist".

In 2003, nearly 29 years after his death, the Indian government led by Prime Minister Atal Bihari Vajpayee released a commemorative stamp in his honour.

His apparent bias in favour of Vallabhbhai Patel continues to be noted by the authors who have reviewed his work.
