= P'iq'iñ Q'ara (Loayza) =

Mountain in Bolivia

- P'iq'iñ Qala
- Location within Bolivia

Highest point
- Elevation: 4,960 m (16,270 ft)
- Coordinates: 17°00′16″S 67°26′44″W

Geography
- Location: Bolivia, La Paz Department, Loayza Province
- Parent range: Andes

P'iq'iñ Q'ara (Aymara p'iq'iña head, q'ara bare, bald, p'iq'iña q'ara bald, "baldheaded", also spelled Phequen Khara) or P'iq'iñ Qala (Aymara qala stone, "bare stone", also spelled Pekhen Khala) is a mountain in the Andes of Bolivia which reaches a height of approximately 4,960 m (16,270 ft). It is located in the La Paz Department, Loayza Province, Malla Municipality, north of Malla. The Malla Jawira flows along its eastern slopes.
