= Yaypuri =

Mountain in Bolivia

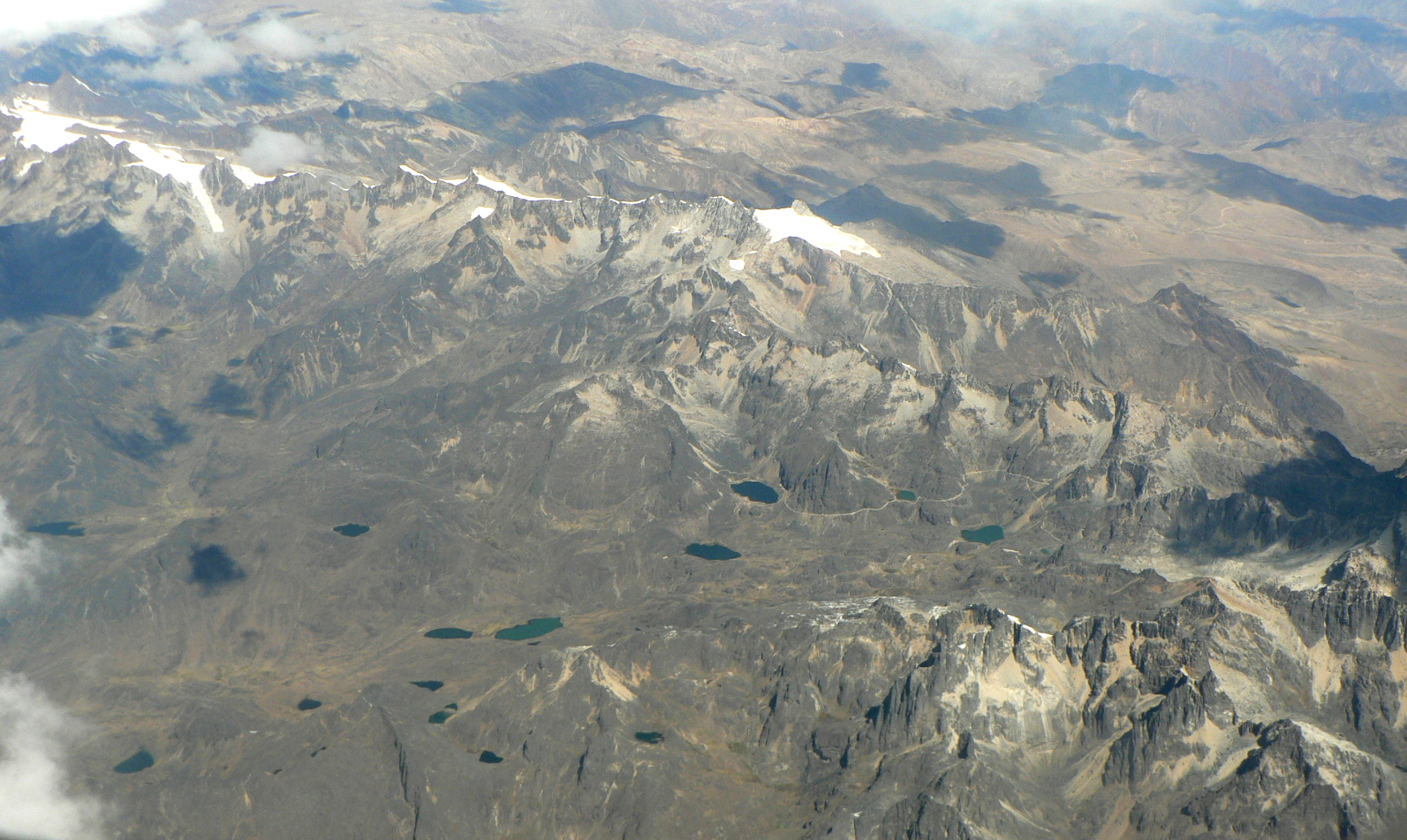
- Aerial view of Yaypuri (upper left part of this image). (North is to the lower part of this image.)

Highest point
- Elevation: 5,566 m (18,261 ft)
- Coordinates: 16°54′30″S 67°25′32″W

Geography
- Location within Bolivia
- Location: Bolivia
- Parent range: Andes, Kimsa Cruz

Yaypuri (Aymara, also spelled Yaipuri) is a mountain in the Bolivian Andes, about 5,566 metres (18,261 ft) high. It lies in the Kimsa Cruz mountain range, southeast of Kalsunani (Calzonani) and Quri Ch'uma. It is situated in the La Paz Department on the border of the Quime Municipality of the Inquisivi Province and the Malla Municipality of the Loayza Province.

== See also ==
- Mama Uqllu
- List of mountains in the Andes
