= Sapahaqui Municipality =

Sapahaqui Sapa Jaqhi
- Municipality
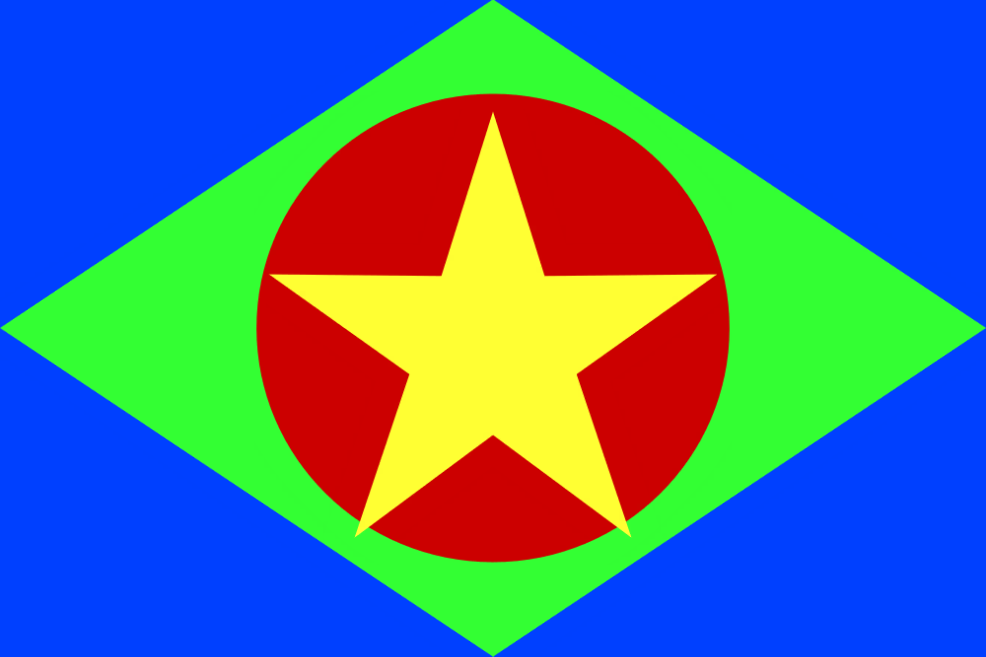
- Flag

- Location within Bolivia
- Coordinates: 16°55′S 67°50′W
- Country: Bolivia
- Department: La Paz Department
- Province: Loayza Province
- Seat: Sapahaqui
- Time zone: UTC-4 (BOT)

Sapahaqui or Sapa Jaqhi (Aymara) is a municipality in the Loayza Province in the La Paz Department in Bolivia. Its seat is Sapahaqui (Sapa Jaqhi).

== See also ==
- K'ark'ani
- Pichaqani
- Pukara
- Suka Sukani
- Wila Quta
