= Jach'a Willk'i =

Mountain in Bolivia

- Location within Bolivia

Highest point
- Elevation: 4,000 m (13,000 ft)
- Coordinates: 16°58′50″S 67°33′27″W

Geography
- Location: Bolivia; La Paz Department
- Parent range: Andes

Jach'a Willk'i (Aymara jach'a big, willk'i gap, "big gap", also spelled Jachcha Willkhi) is a mountain in the Bolivian Andes which reaches a height of approximately 4,000 m (13,000 ft). It is located in the La Paz Department, Loayza Province, Cairoma Municipality.
