= Quta K'uchu =

Mountain in Bolivia

- Location within Bolivia

Highest point
- Elevation: 4,820 m (15,810 ft)
- Coordinates: 17°04′18″S 67°19′38″W

Geography
- Location: Bolivia, La Paz Department
- Parent range: Andes

Quta K'uchu (Aymara quta lake, k'uchu, q'uch'u corner, "lake corner", also spelled Khota Khuchu, Kkota Khuchu) is a mountain in the La Paz Department in the Andes of Bolivia which reaches a height of approximately 4,820 m (15,810 ft). It is located in the Loayza Province, in the southeast of the Malla Municipality. Quta K'uchu lies southwest of Kimsa Willk'i.
