= Ch'api Ch'apini =

Mountain in Bolivia

- Location within Bolivia

Highest point
- Elevation: 4,640 m (15,220 ft)
- Coordinates: 17°04′35″S 67°24′26″W

Geography
- Location: Bolivia, La Paz Department
- Parent range: Andes

Ch'api Ch'apini (Aymara ch'api thorn, the reduplication indicates that there is a complex of something, -ni a suffix, "the one with many thorns, also spelled Chapi Chapini) is a mountain in the La Paz Department in the Andes of Bolivia which reaches a height of approximately 4,640 m (15,220 ft). It is located in the Loayza Province, Malla Municipality. Ch'api Ch'apini lies southwest of Wari Jarisiña.
