= Yaco =

- Town
- Location within Bolivia
- Coordinates: 17°09′S 67°25′W
- Country: Bolivia
- Department: La Paz Department
- Province: José Ramón Loayza Province
- Municipality: Yaco Municipality

Population (2001)
  - Total: 640
- Time zone: UTC-4 (BOT)

Yaco is a location in the La Paz Department in Bolivia. It is the seat of the Yaco Municipality, the third municipal section of the José Ramón Loayza Province.
