= Wila Pukara =

Mountain in Bolivia

- Location within Bolivia

Highest point
- Elevation: 4,290 m (14,070 ft)
- Coordinates: 17°08′06″S 67°26′50″W

Geography
- Location: Bolivia; La Paz Department, Loayza Province
- Parent range: Andes

Wila Pukara (Aymara wila blood, blood red, pukara fortress, "red fortress", also spelled Wila Pucara) is a 4,290-metre-high (14,075 ft) mountain in the Bolivian Andes. It is situated in the La Paz Department, Loayza Province, in the north of the Yaco Municipality.
