= Malla Bedian =

- village
- Country: India
- State: Punjab
- District: Nawanshahr

Government
  - Type: SAD, AAP

Area
  - Total: 5 km^{2} (1.9 sq mi)

Population
  - Total: 2,000
  - Density: 400/km^{2} (1,000/sq mi)

Languages
  - Official: Punjabi
- Time zone: UTC+5:30 (IST)
- PIN: 144417
- Telephone code: 01823-
- Coastline: 0 kilometres (0 mi)
- Nearest city: Aur
- Sex ratio: 50-50 ♂/♀
- Avg. summer temperature: 44 °C (111 °F)
- Avg. winter temperature: 4 °C (39 °F)

Malla Bedian is a village located in Nawanshahr district, India. It is located between Nawanshahr and Phillaur just north of the city of Aur.

The main occupation of the villagers is agriculture and cattle rearing. Approximately half of the population of this village has migrated to the western countries in search for employment.
