= Press Club of India =

Body of journalists based in New Delhi, India

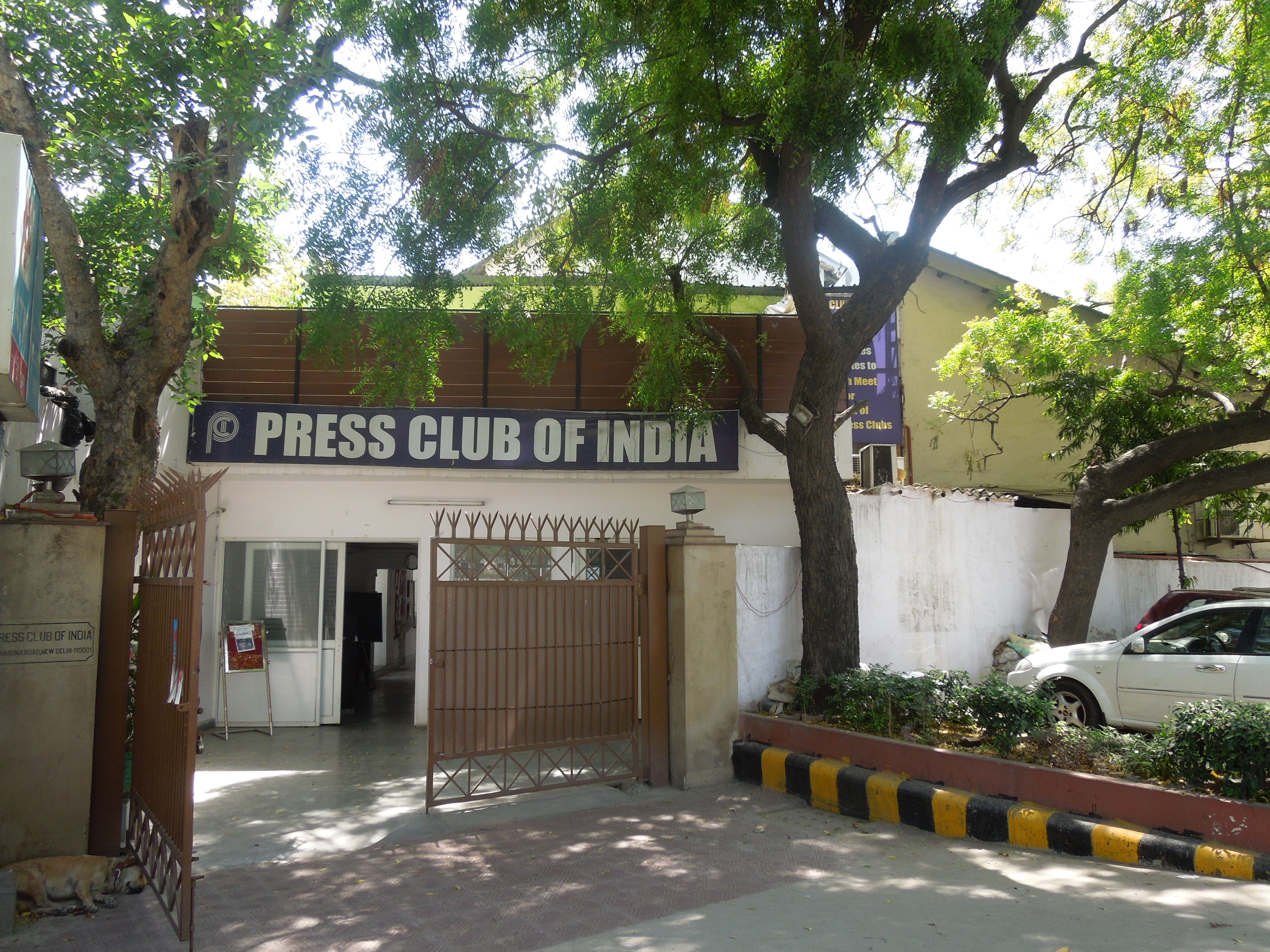
- Press Club of India entrance, April 2017
- Formation: 20 December 1957; 68 years ago
- Founder: Durga Das
- Headquarters: 1, Raisina Road, near Krishi Bhavan, New Delhi 110001, India
- President: Gautam Lahiri
- Vice President: Shahid K Abbas
- Secretary-General: Vinay Kumar
- Joint Secretary: Chander Shekhar Luthra
- Revenue: ₹ 9,00,00,000 INR (2021)
- Website: www.pressclubofindia.org

Press Club of India (PCI) is an association of journalists and media professionals in New Delhi, India. Founded by Durga Das in 1957, it is led by an annually elected executive body, which consists of a president, vice president, secretary-general, joint secretary and treasurer besides 16 members of the managing committee. As of 2021, it has around 4,200 active members, 900 associate members and a few dozen corporate members, making it the largest body of journalists in India.

== History ==
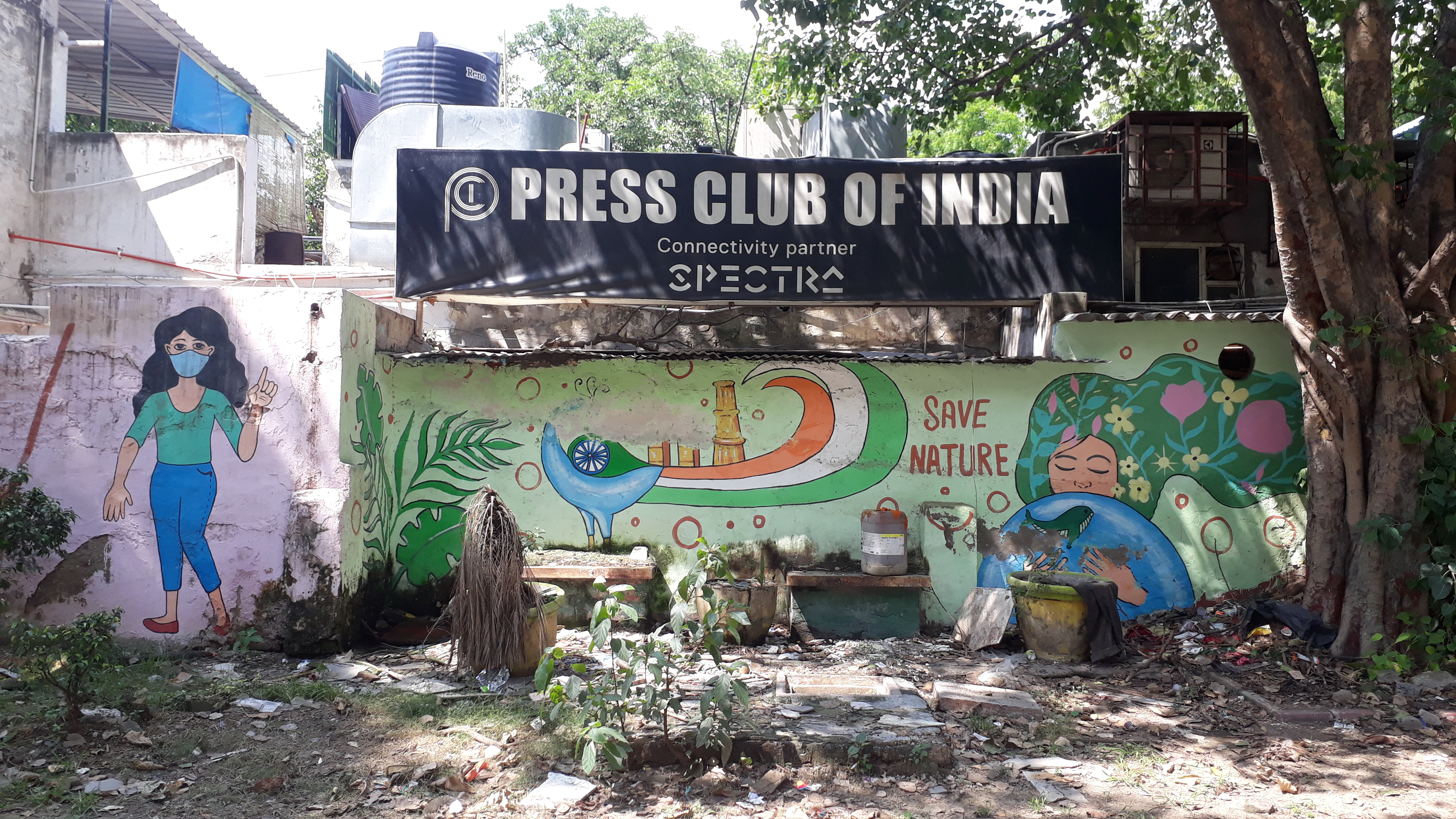
Wall of the Press Club of India

During the 1930s, Durga Das used to visit London as part of his regular business trips while he still worked for the Associated Press of India. He was inspired from the London Press Club and motivated himself to replicate a similar model in India. Press Club of India was established on 20 December 1957 by then editor-in-chief of Hindustan Times, Durga Das. It was incorporated on 10 March 1958 and was inaugurated on 2 February 1959 with just 30 members by then Home Minister Govind Ballabh Pant. Das was elected as its founding president whereas DR Mankekar as its first secretary-general.

PCI got itself an official website and an email address during the tenure of secretary-general Pushpendra Kulshrestha. In August 2009, PCI treasurer Nadim Kazmi called an extraordinary general meeting (EGM) to dissolve the incumbent management committee led by secretary-general Pushpendra Kulshrestha, accusing the latter of financial irregularities and authoritarianism. Couple of days later, amid the controversy, Indian National Congress leader Sonia Gandhi relinquished her honorary membership of the club. In late September 2009, the Delhi High Court upheld the management committee led by Kulshrestha as legitimate, allowing him to continue his fourth term. In November 2010, TR Ramachandran was elected as the new president of PCI whereas Sandeep Dikshit as its new secretary-general. The group of journalists have been governing PCI since then.

In early 2021, PCI president Umakant Lakhera announced that the club will soon establish the Bangabandhu Media Centre in honor of Sheikh Mujibur Rahman, the father of nation of Bangladesh. In late 2021, PCI organized a seminar titled 'The Reciprocal Relations Between Parliament and Media', in which Indian National Congress politician Mallikarjun Kharge raked the issue of media personnel being denied entry into the Parliament of India.

In August 2026, the organisation attracted controversy for hosting an event where religious song was dedicated to Indian Prime Minister Narendra Modi and Modi was depicted as god. PCI denied organising the event and said a show-cause notice has been served to the individuals who recommended the booking of the event.
