= Suka Sukani =

Mountain in Bolivia

- Location within Bolivia

Highest point
- Elevation: 4,600 m (15,100 ft)
- Coordinates: 17°07′43″S 67°46′11″W

Geography
- Location: Bolivia; La Paz Department
- Parent range: Andes

Suka Sukani (Aymara suka furrow, the reduplication indicates that there is a complex of something, "the one with the furrows", also spelled Suca Sucani) is a mountain in the Bolivian Andes which reaches a height of approximately 4,600 m (15,100 ft). It is located in the La Paz Department, Loayza Province, Sapahaqui Municipality (Sapa Jaqhi). Suka Sukani lies northeast of Q'ara Qullu and K'ark'ani.
