= Turi Turini (La Paz) =

Mountain in Bolivia

- Location within Bolivia

Highest point
- Coordinates: 16°57′46″S 67°25′31″W

Geography
- Location: Bolivia, La Paz Department, Loayza Province, Malla Municipality
- Parent range: Andes

Turi Turini (Aymara turi tower, the reduplication indicates that there is a group of something, -ni a suffix to indicate ownership, "the one with a group of towers", also spelled Torri Torrini) is a mountain in the La Paz Department in the Andes of Bolivia. It is located in the Loayza Province, Malla Municipality, northeast of Mallachuma.
