= Wayna Khunu Qullu =

Mountain in Bolivia

- Location within Bolivia

Highest point
- Elevation: 5,640 m (18,500 ft)
- Coordinates: 16°59′11″S 67°20′44″W

Geography
- Location: Bolivia
- Parent range: Andes, Kimsa Cruz mountain range

Wayna Khunu Qullu or Wayna Khunuqullu (Aymara wayna young (man), bachelor, khunu snow, qullu mountain, "young snow mountain", Hispanicized spellings Huayna Cuno Collo, Huaynacunocollo, Huayna Cuno Kollo) is one of the highest peaks in the Kimsa Cruz mountain range in the Andes of Bolivia. Its summit reaches about 5,640 metres (18,504 ft) above sea level.

Wayna Khunu Qullu is located in the La Paz Department, on the border of the Inquisivi Province and the Loayza Province, south-east of Jach'a Khunu Qullu, the highest elevation in this mountain range.

== See also ==
- List of mountains in the Andes
