= Jach'a Walluni =

Mountain in Bolivia

- Location within Bolivia

Highest point
- Elevation: 4,140 m (13,580 ft)
- Coordinates: 17°04′49″S 67°32′06″W

Geography
- Location: Bolivia; La Paz Department
- Parent range: Andes

Jach'a Walluni (Aymara jach'a big, wallu rocks, cliffs, -ni a suffix, "the one with big cliffs" or "the big one with cliffs", also spelled Jachcha Hualluni) is a mountain in the Bolivian Andes which reaches a height of approximately 4,140 m (13,580 ft). It is located in the La Paz Department, Loayza Province, Luribay Municipality. Jach'a Walluni lies northwest of Jach'a Wayllani and Tani Tani.
