= Aur Nawanshahr =

Coordinates: 31.068°N 76.001°E

Aur is a town in Jalandhar district of Punjab, India which is located on the Nawanshahr to Phillaur National Highway. Aur is connected with a number of cities including Phillaur, Nawanshahr, Banga, and Rahon. It is located 12 km (7.5 mi) from District Shaheed Bhagat Singh Nagar. Aur is a block of 83 villages which is located 101 km From Punjab capital Chandigarh.

Aur is a quaint little town nestled in the interior of Punjab, the road from Phagwara to Aur is full of greenery and scenic landscape, especially in the rainy and winter season. Aur is renowned for its spiritual glory in the neighbouring areas. It is also known as "santan di bhoomi" meaning "Land of saints" as many temples devoted to realized saints are located in Aur. Some of the famous god realized saints from Aur are Baba Nathpuri maharaj, Baba ballbhdas and Baba dharamgeer.

Baba Nathpuri maharaj Baba nathpuri maharaj also known as Baba banaspuri maharaj by few was a great bhakta of Lord Shiva who attained Mahasamadhi sometime in the 18th century. An annual "Bhandara" festival is celebrated at the temple dedicated to babaji. The festival is celebrated with much fanfare on the first Monday of January every year and attracts visitors from far-off towns and cities of Punjab. A mahaprasad is served to the devotees. It is a major festival for devotees and over the years has gained popularity among the locals as well as devotees who come from faraway places to seek the blessings of babaji.

According to local accounts many people from Aur have experienced the divine grace of Babaji, fondly known as swamiji by some devotees. The followers of swamiji are spread across globally mainly viz. western Europe, United States, and pay homage to this venerated saint on their annual visits to the motherland.

Baba ballbhdas Baba ballbhdas ji - a renowned saint and spiritual powerhouse known for his kind and compassionate grace lived in Aur in the 18th century and was an ardent follower of Lord Shiva. The story carried down generations suggests that Baba ballabhdas ji and baba nath puri maharaj are real brothers who devoted their lives to the path of Shiv bhakti and are worshipped as Divine souls or saints and as a Kulguru by generations of devotees mainly from Aur.

Baba dharamgeer Baba dharamgeer ji - a saint who lived in the 20th century in Aur and was known for his compassion towards all, be it human beings or animals he loved all equally there is a temple in the central part of Aur dedicated to Babaji and the temple complex houses temples of Lord hanuman and Lord shani and other Hindu gods.

The life story of Baba dharamgeer is a classic tale of devotion and life spent in spiritual inquiry, the tale narrated in local folklore is that of Babaji arriving as a small boy of around 10 years in Aur, he had run away from home to avoid marriage and stayed in hanuman temple, Aur. Babaji was spiritual in nature since his childhood and his stay in temple aided provided him with opportunity to pursue spiritual inquiry and over the period of years he came to be known as a Kind saint who had a soft corner for animals and used to feed cats, dogs from his own plate never discriminating between humans and animals, treating all with the same kindness.

An old anecdote about Babaji suggests that he would practice a form of yoga that gave him the power of separating his body parts and he would take out his intestines to dry them in the sunlight. (Note: This is old practice known to many accomplished yogis of India) even accounts of sai baba of shirdi drying his intestines have been reported by some devotees.

Another story about Babaji's miracles goes like this: In 1947 during the partition of India, Babaji, using his yogic powers, had seen the coming carnage that partition would heap upon the citizens of both the countries and helped many of his devotees escape to safety, warning them of the impending riots and massacre.

There are many miracles that have been attributed to the three spiritual giants of Aur. Miraculous recoveries from illness to help in life, visions of the future and blessings that have helped many prosper.

A very famous person from the village of Aur is journalist Durga Das. He wrote a book called India: From Curzon to Nehru and After. He was born around 1900 AD. He lived during time of freedom struggle and wrote about it from 1900 to 1969. He is a distinguished journalist.
