= Pichaqani (Loayza) =

Mountain in Bolivia

- Location within Bolivia

Highest point
- Elevation: 4,208 m (13,806 ft)
- Coordinates: 16°51′55″S 67°54′48″W

Geography
- Location: Bolivia; La Paz Department, Loayza Province
- Parent range: Andes

Pichaqani (Aymara pichaqa, phichaqa, piqacha a big needle, -ni a suffix to indicate ownership, "the one with a big needle", also spelled Pichacani) is a 4,208-metre-high (13,806 ft) mountain in the Bolivian Andes. It is situated in the La Paz Department, Loayza Province, Sapahaqui Municipality.
