= Malla (Crete) =

Town of ancient Crete

Coordinates: 35°04′31″N 25°35′09″E

Malla (Ancient Greek: Μάλλα) was a town of ancient Crete. One of the first testimonies about Malla is an agreement between the cities of Malla and Lyctus dated to the 3rd century BCE. It is also mentioned in the list of Cretan cities that signed an alliance with Eumenes II of Pergamon in the year 183 BCE. Coins minted by Malla dated between the 3rd and 2nd centuries BCE with the inscription «ΜΑΛ» survive.

Its site is located near modern Malles.
