= K'ark'ani =

Mountain in Bolivia

- Location within Bolivia

Highest point
- Elevation: 4,700 m (15,400 ft)
- Coordinates: 17°08′43″S 67°46′47″W

Geography
- Location: Bolivia; La Paz Department
- Parent range: Andes

K'ark'ani (Aymara k'ark'a crevice, fissure, crack, -ni a suffix, "the one with the crevice", also spelled Kharkhani, erroneously also Khaikhani, Khaskhani) is a mountain in the Bolivian Andes which reaches a height of approximately 4,700 m (15,400 ft). It is located in the La Paz Department, Loayza Province, on the border of the municipalities of Luribay and Sapahaqui (Sapa Jaqhi). K'ark'ani lies northwest of Q'ara Qullu and southwest of Wila Qullu. The Achachi Qala River flows along its western slope. There is a little lake east of K'ark'ani. Its name is Wila Quta ("red lake").
