= Turi Turini (Malla) =

Mountain in Bolivia

- Location within Bolivia

Highest point
- Elevation: 5,040 m (16,540 ft)
- Coordinates: 17°00′24″S 67°24′36″W

Geography
- Location: Bolivia, La Paz Department, Loayza Province, Malla Municipality
- Parent range: Andes

Turi Turini (Aymara turi tower, the reduplication indicates that there is a group of something, -ni a suffix to indicate ownership, "the one with a group of towers", also spelled Turri Turruini) is a mountain in the La Paz Department in the Andes of Bolivia which reaches a height of approximately 5,040 m (16,540 ft). It is located in the Loayza Province, Malla Municipality, southwest of Mallachuma. Turi Turini lies northeast of T'ula T'ulani.
