= Achachi Qala (Cairoma) =

Mountain in Bolivia

- Location within Bolivia

Highest point
- Elevation: 2,500 m (8,200 ft)
- Coordinates: 16°49′42″S 67°41′32″W

Geography
- Location: Bolivia; La Paz Department, Loayza Province
- Parent range: Andes

Achachi Qala (Aymara for "gigantic stone", also spelled Achachi Khala) is a mountain in the Bolivian Andes which reaches a height of approximately 2,500 m (8,200 ft). It is located in the La Paz Department, Loayza Province, Cairoma Municipality.
