= Malla Qullu =

Mountain in Bolivia

- Location within Bolivia

Highest point
- Coordinates: 17°01′39″S 67°26′44″W

Geography
- Location: Bolivia, La Paz Department
- Parent range: Andes

Malla Qullu (Aymara malla lead, qullu mountain, also spelled Malla Kkollu) is a mountain in the La Paz Department in the Andes of Bolivia. It is located in the Loayza Province, Malla Municipality, northeast of Malla. Malla Qullu lies south of P'iq'iñ Q'ara. The Malla Jawira flows along its eastern slopes.
