= Torrini =

Torrini may refer to

- Torrini (jeweller)
- Rudolph Edward Torrini, an American artist
- Emilíana Torrini, an Icelandic singer songwriter
- Elisa Torrini, an Italian model

== See also ==
- Turini (disambiguation)
