= Qillqata (La Paz) =

Mountain in Bolivia

- Location within Bolivia

Highest point
- Elevation: 3,922 m (12,867 ft)
- Coordinates: 17°03′51″S 67°29′29″W

Geography
- Location: Bolivia; La Paz Department, Loayza Province
- Parent range: Andes

Qillqata (Aymara qillqaña to write, -ta a suffix to indicate the participle, "written" or "something written", also spelled Kelkhata) is a 3,922-metre-high (12,867 ft) mountain in the Bolivian Andes. It lies in the La Paz Department, Loayza Province, Malla Municipality. Qillqata is situated south-west of Malla. The river Malla Jawira flows along its southern slopes.
