= Janq'u Quta (Loayza) =

Mountain in Bolivia

- Location within Bolivia

Highest point
- Elevation: 4,940 m (16,210 ft)
- Coordinates: 16°50′09″S 67°30′42″W

Geography
- Location: Bolivia; La Paz Department, Loayza Province
- Parent range: Andes

Janq'u Quta (Aymara janq'u white, quta lake, "white lake", also spelled Jankho Khota, Jankho Kkota) is a mountain in the Bolivian Andes which reaches a height of approximately 4,940 m (16,210 ft). It is located in the La Paz Department, Loayza Province, Cairoma Municipality.
