= Epos 257 =

Czech artist

Epos 257 is a Czech artist. His art works with the urban environment and iconography of the city of Prague. His inventions frequently focus on contemporary social topics, and regularly address issues surrounding public space. Epos 257’s identity has remained unknown as of 2019.

== Life ==
Born in the 1980s in Prague, Epos 257 started his career as a graffiti artist; some influence from those days can still be seen in his work. Epos 257 is a graduate of the Academy of Arts, Architecture and Design, and a member of the interdisciplinary group Ztohoven.

== Works ==
Epos 257's art is characterized by examination of public space, especially the way it is used and the limits of what is and isn’t public. He repeatedly challenges the creation in public with its institutional conception. He has created five solo and several collective exhibitions.

=== Hay ===
In 2009, Epos 257 anonymously placed more than thirty bales of hay around the center of Prague. However, his actions were subsequently interpreted by the media as a public threat, and even terrorism. After some time, he was approached by the National Theater in Prague about an exposition, and repeated his Hay exhibit on the theater's piazza (renamed to Václav Havel Square). However, that time he obtained all of the required permits.

=== 50 Square Meters of Public Space ===
In 2010, Epos 257 continued to deal with the boundaries of public space, even in the context of legislation. He put up a fence around 50 square meters of space in Palackeho Square, where there is an exception to the law prohibiting public gatherings without notice (and is therefore referred to as the "Czech Hyde Park”). Nothing was placed inside of the enclosed space. The exhibit lasted for 54 days on the square, after which Epos himself contacted city officials. This work was intended to point out the indifference to the use of public space and the unfairness of certain restrictions associated with it.

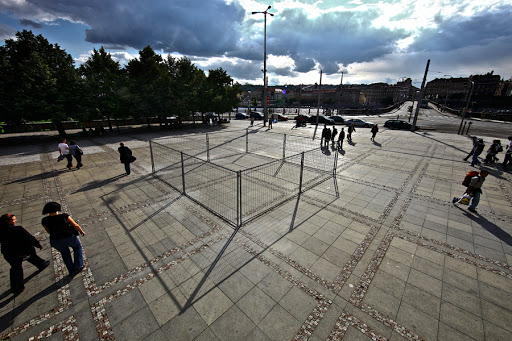
“Meaningless“ fencing of Palackého square

=== Portrait ===
Epos 257 has also repeatedly created billboards. In the Portrait project, he framed giant cut-outs of the smiling faces of the final candidates for the 2013 Czech presidential election. While he left the remains of the promotional posters without the politician's faces in the original location, Epos installed the framed and glazed representations opposite each other. He then went on to place a gigantic portrait of the election winner Miloš Zeman in the Czech National Library of Technology.

=== Retro-reflection ===
Epos 257 realized the project both in the gallery and partly in a public space from 2017. It is also the author´s diploma work at the Prague Academy of Arts, Architecture and Design. One of its main parts, a giant mosaic of 256 authentic Z3 traffic signs with retroreflective foil, is located on the facade of one of the houses in Prague's Knížecí Street. The author acquired the individual parts of the piece through an extensive exchange of the aforementioned signage. During it, he gradually replaced the original signs with new ones throughout the metropolis. The exhibition part of the project was then installed directly in the promenade of the Prague Trade Fair Palace - in a place that is in close contact with the street, and therefore the public space through a large glass wall.

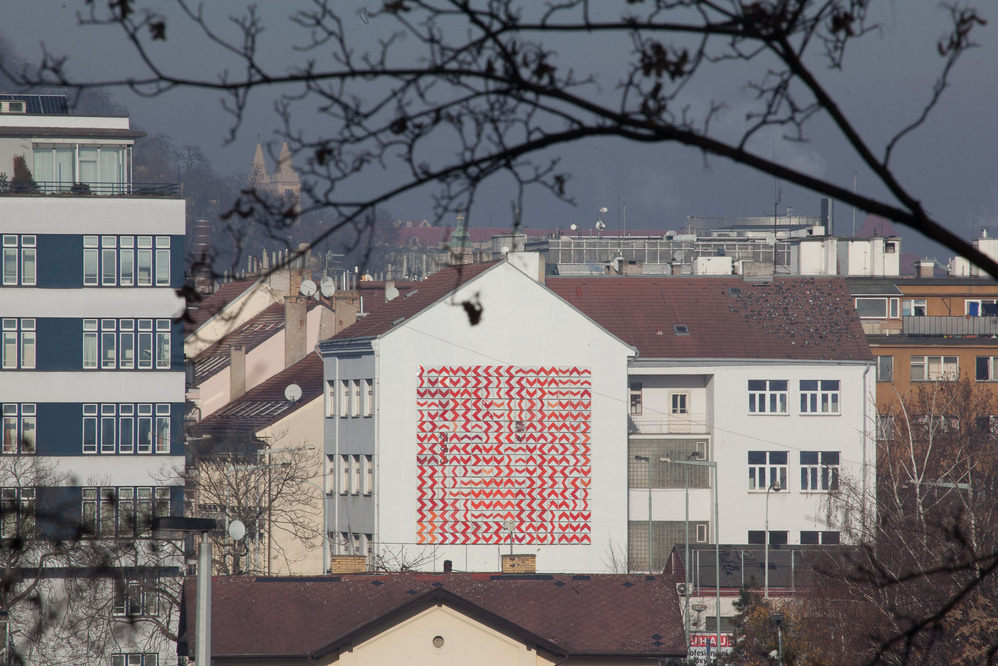
Mosaic of traffic signs on the facade of one of the houses in Knížecí street

==== Interpretation ====
Following the ambiguous name of the entire project, the curators of the gallery part of the project, František Teplý and Jiří Ptáček, emphasize the motif of "transition between two worlds" and their subsequent alignment. The principle of retroreflection is also interpreted directly in the case of the exhibited objects. Teplý and Ptáček state that the artefacts are abstracted maps and relics of long-term interventions, documentation settled back into specific spatiotemporal coordinates.

==== 3080 Transactions ====
The Retroreflection project was then extended by Epos 257 by another level. The condition for entering the exhibition was the exchange of any banknote for a banknote of the same denomination. Thus, no one lost or earned, but, there was an exchange act referring to the circulation of money, goods and services in society. The symbolic "washing" of banknotes not only revealed the background of some works created within the Retroreflection to visitors, but also involved them (mostly unconsciously) in the creation of a work of art. The author himself sent a plastic bag with the accumulated amount to auction. He managed to sell the work, named 3080 transactions, which consisted of banknotes with a total value of CZK 878,600, for CZK 1,100,000 without an auction commission. Transaction number 3081 thus made him the most expensive Czech artist of the young generation.

=== Fire Mountain ===
As in the case of the previous work, this project was realized by the author both in the institutional and partly in the public space. At the place of the same name in Prague's Třebešín, Epos, together with a homeless man and former stonemason Marcel, created a monument referring to the local homeless community. The central theme is the phenomena of homelessness and excluded localities. It was unveiled by Epos 257 on 4 June 2019.

In the Museum of the Capital City of Prague and later in the Museum of the City of Bratislava, the artist then presented an extensive collection of objects, which he created during several years of mapping the defunct settlement. The whole project then also included an interdisciplinary conference dedicated to excluded urban areas and should be complemented by a forthcoming publication on the same topic. The author made with one of its former inhabitants, Marcel, a trained stonemason. The work has the form of a large stone, on which stands a copper inscription FIRE MOUNTAIN, WE WERE HERE, WE LIVED HERE, WE ARE NO LONGER HERE, GOODBYE.

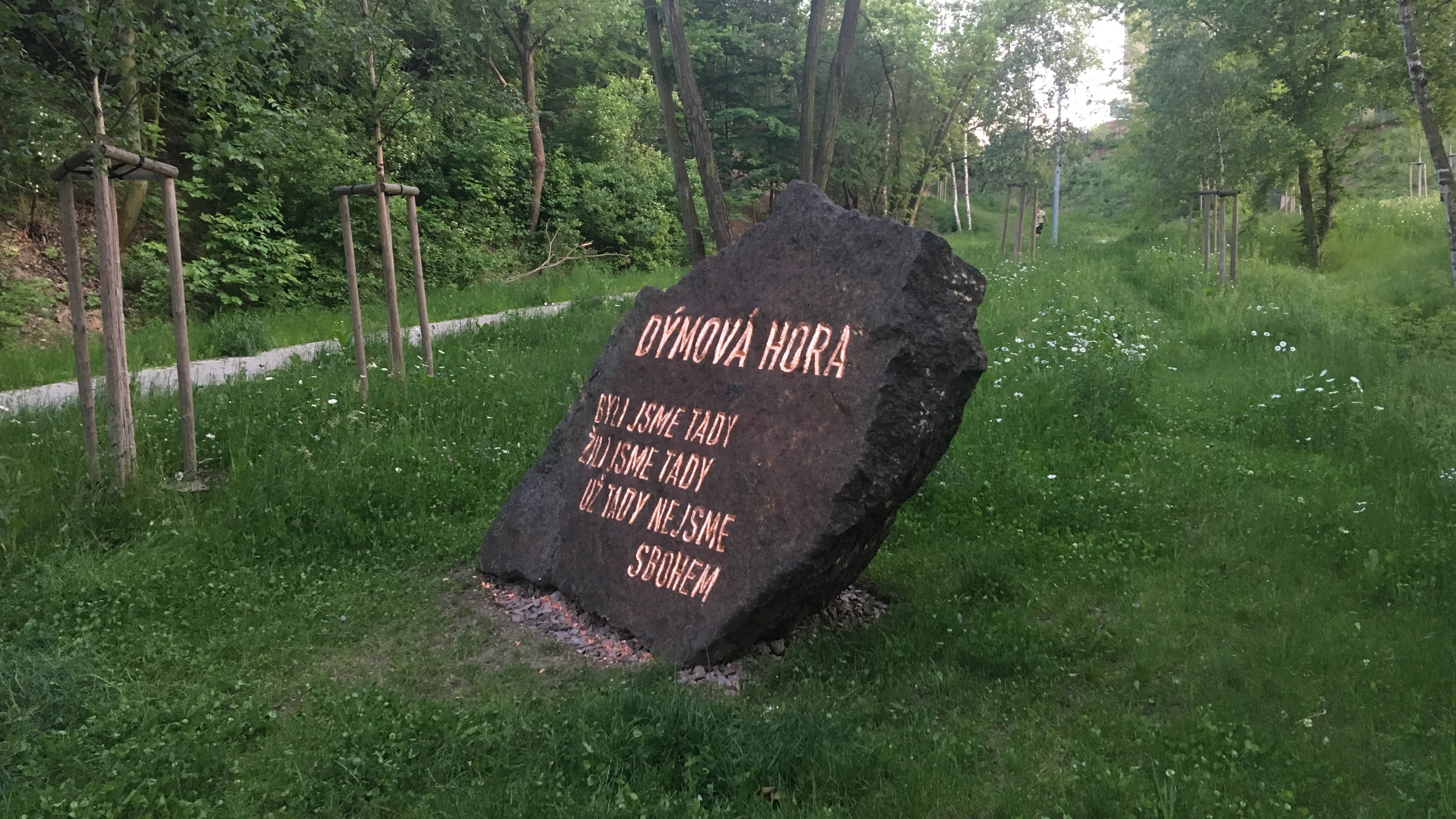
Monument near the former settlement of Fire Mountain.

The exhibition part of the project took place at the end of 2019 in the Museum of the Capital City of Prague and in the spring of 2020 in the Bratislava City Museum. Through a museum presentation of an extensive collection of original artefacts, it offered visitors an insight into the lives of people who recently lived in the Fire Mountains. In addition to the artefacts and detailed facts, it also contained audio recordings of many interviews with locals, but also a summary of legends and myths that Epos 257 collected during a several-week stay at the site. The exhibition also included a model of the original model of the Fire Mountain, which is now home to luxury apartment buildings, a kindergarten and a garden with a playground.

The planned book recapitulates long-term artistic research to put it into a broader context. In addition to interviews with former inhabitants of the settlement, it offers contributions from experts on the issue.

On the occasion of the Dýmová hora project, a conference WITHOUT POWER: a topography of exclusion and neglect took place on 13 November 2019 in the Museum of the Capital City of Prague. The all-day meeting included theoretical and historical lectures from various fields, panel debates, interviews with people who have experience with homeless life, as well as presentations by artists and examples of projects related to homelessness.

== Controversies ==
It was mainly because of his “billboard” projects that Epos 257 was associated with breaking the law. His actions before the presidential and municipal elections also revived the debate on the ethical boundaries of artistic creation. Epos 257 did, however, fully compensate the billboard owners for the financial damages he caused in 2013 by cutting out the heads of the presidential candidates.

== Exhibitions ==
=== Solo ===
- 2019 Dýmová hora, The City of Prague Museum, Prague
- 2018 Kořeny, větve, šlahouny, Trafo Gallery, Prague
- 2017 Retroreflexe, Trade Fair Palace, National Gallery Prague
- 2015 Lines, PageFive, Prague
- 2014 Who Cares? Dancing House Gallery, Prague
- 2012 I can't help myself, Trafo Gallery, Prague

=== Collective ===
- 2017 Cultural Hijack, Archip, Prague
- 2016 Resurrection, Trafo Gallery, Prague
- 2016 The Art of Urban Interference, Gallery Apollonia, Strasbourg
- 2015 Bien Urban, Public Art Festival, Besançon
- 2014 Politika, Urban Space Gallery, Manchester
- 2014 Nad čarou, DOX Centre for Contemporary Art, Prague
- 2014 Vabanque, Czech Centre Berlin Gallery, Berlín
- 2013 Cultural Hijack, Institut of Architecture and School of Architecture AA, London
- 2012 Stuck on the City, Prague City Gallery, Prague
- 2011 NG 333, National Gallery, Prague
- 2011 Home, Upper Space Gallery, Manchester
- 2010 Urban Inventions, Urban Art Info Gallery, Berlin
- 2010 Young Art Bienalle ZVON, Prague City Gallery, Prague
- 2010 Metropolis, Czech Pavilon Expo 2010, Shanghai
- 2008 NAMES, Street Art Festival, Trafo Gallery, Prague
- 2008 Pod čarou, Hall C, Prague
- 2007 Prague street art, Leica Gallery 28; Prague
- 2007 Keep it Thoro, NoD Gallery, Prague
- 2005 European Street, Gallery Du Moment, Brussels

== Publications ==
- 2009 About a Tree, Agarde Publishing, Prague
- 2010 Olgoj Chorchoj, Agarde Publishing, Prague
- 2011 Seno, Agarde Publishing, Prague
- 2018 Kořeny, větve, šlahouny, Spolek Trafačka, Prague

== Awards ==
- 2018 The most beautiful book about fine art, Czech Design
