= Malla (given name) =

Malla is a short version of Magdalena, and a separate given name. It may refer to:

- Malla Malmivaara (born 1982), Finnish singer and actress
- Malla Nunn (born 1963), Swaziland-born Australian writer, screenwriter and film director
- Malla Reddy, Indian male politician
- Magdalena Rudenschöld (1766–1823), Swedish conspirator
- Malla Silfverstolpe (1782–1861), Swedish salon hostess
- Malla, nickname of Indian actress Malaika Arora (born 1973)
