= Jach'a Ch'uñu Uma =

Mountain in Bolivia

- Location within Bolivia

Highest point
- Elevation: 3,960 m (12,990 ft)
- Coordinates: 17°04′24″S 67°35′38″W

Geography
- Location: Bolivia; La Paz Department
- Parent range: Andes

Jach'a Ch'uñu Uma (Aymara jach'a big, ch'uñu dried, frozen potato, uma water, also spelled Jachcha Chuñu Uma) is a mountain in the Bolivian Andes which reaches a height of approximately 3,960 m (12,990 ft). It is located in the La Paz Department, Loayza Province, Luribay Municipality. Jach'a Ch'uñu Uma lies north of a river named Ch'uñu Uma.
