= Chuqi Sillani =

Mountain in Luribay Municipality, Bolivia

- Location within Bolivia

Highest point
- Elevation: 4,812 m (15,787 ft)
- Coordinates: 17°11′40″S 67°43′07″W

Geography
- Location: Bolivia; La Paz Department, Loayza Province, Luribay Municipality
- Parent range: Andes

Chuqi Sillani (Aymara chuqi gold, silla cane of maize, -ni a suffix, "the one with the golden cane of maize", also spelled Choque Sillani) is a 4,812-metre-high (15,787 ft) mountain in the Bolivian Andes. It is located in the La Paz Department, Loayza Province, Luribay Municipality. Chuqi Sillani lies southeast of Qillwan Quta and east of a plain named Qillwan Quta Pampa.
