= Cairoma Municipality =

Coordinates: 16.8333°S 67.5°W

Cairoma K'ayruma
- Municipality
- Interactive map of Cairoma
- Country: Bolivia
- Department: La Paz Department
- Province: Loayza Province
- Seat: Cairoma
- Time zone: UTC-4 (BOT)

Cairoma Municipality is the fifth municipal section of the Loayza Province in the La Paz Department, Bolivia. Its seat is Cairoma.

== Geography ==
The Kimsa Cruz mountain range traverses the municipality. Some of the highest mountains of the municipality are listed below:

- Achachi Qala
- Achuma
- Allqa Quta
- Churi Qala
- Ch'apini
- Jach'a Willk'i
- Janq'u Quta
- Janq'u Willk'i
- Kuntur Jiwaña
- Kunturiri
- Liqiliqini
- Marka Pata
- Ñiq'in Pata
- Pukara Ch'utu
- P'iqiri
- Sura Sura
- Taruja Umaña
- Turini
- Uyuyuni
- Waka P'iqi
- Wanuni
- Wayra Willk'i
- Wila Willk'i
- Wiluqu
- Wisk'achani

== See also ==
- Chillwa Quta
- Warus Quta
