= Jachacunocollo =

Mountain in Bolivia

- Location within Bolivia

Highest point
- Elevation: 5,800 m (19,000 ft)
- Coordinates: 16°58′43″S 67°20′53″W

Geography
- Location: Bolivia
- Parent range: Andes, Kimsa Cruz mountain range

Climbing
- First ascent: Reached shoulder 20m below top-1911: 1-1939.

Jachacunocollo (possibly from Aymara jach'a big, khunu snow, qullu mountain), also known as Jacha Cuno Collo, Tres Marias, Don Luis or Jacha Collo is a mountain in the Andes in Bolivia. It is the highest elevation in the Quimsa Cruz Range reaching an elevation of about 5,800 metres (19,029 ft). Jachacunocollo is situated in the La Paz Department, Inquisivi Province, Quime Municipality, north-west of Wayna Khunu Qullu, the second highest mountain in this mountain range.

== See also ==
- Wallatani Lake
- List of mountains in the Andes
