= Ch'apini =

Mountain in Bolivia

- Location within Bolivia

Highest point
- Elevation: 3,474 m (11,398 ft)
- Coordinates: 17°08′20″S 67°33′45″W

Geography
- Location: Bolivia; La Paz Department, Loayza Province, Luribay Municipality
- Parent range: Andes

Ch'apini (Aymara jach'a big, ch'api thorn, -ni a suffix, "the big one with thorns", also spelled Chapini) is a 3,474-metre-high (11,398 ft) mountain in the Bolivian Andes. It is located in the La Paz Department, Loayza Province, Luribay Municipality. Ch'apini lies at the Luribay River, southeast of Jach'a Ch'apini ("big Ch'apini").
