= Mama Uqllu (Bolivia) =

Mountain in Bolivia

Mama Uqllu Puntiagudo
- Location within Bolivia

Highest point
- Elevation: 5,281 m (17,326 ft)
- Coordinates: 16°49′4″S 67°30′18″W

Geography
- Location: Bolivia
- Parent range: Andes, Kimsa Cruz

Climbing
- First ascent: 1-1987 via W. flank, S. ridge (II/V): N.W. pillar (V/VI)- 1987. #

Mama Uqllu (Hispanicized spelling Mama Occllo, Mama Ocllo, Mama Okllo), also Puntiagudo (Spanish for sharp pointed), is a mountain in the Bolivian Andes, about 5,281 metres (17,326 ft) high. It lies in the northern part of the Kimsa Cruz mountain range, south of the mountain Kalsunani (Calzonani) and west of Taruja Umaña. It is situated in the La Paz Department, at the border of the Inquisivi Province, Quime Municipality, and the Loayza Province, Cairoma Municipality, north of the village of Viloco.

== Mama Uqllu lake ==
Mama Uqllu (Mama Okllo) is also the name of the little lake south or south-east of the mountain.

== See also ==
- Quri Ch'uma
- Yaypuri
- List of mountains in the Andes
