= Janq'u Willk'i (Luribay) =

Mountain in Bolivia

- Location within Bolivia

Highest point
- Elevation: 3,762 m (12,343 ft)
- Coordinates: 17°00′40″S 67°34′27″W

Geography
- Location: Bolivia; La Paz Department, Loayza Province
- Parent range: Andes

Janq'u Willk'i (Aymara janq'u white, willk'i gap,"white gap", also spelled Jankho Willkhi) is a 3,762-metre-high (12,343 ft) mountain in the Bolivian Andes. It is located in the La Paz Department, Loayza Province, Luribay Municipality. Janq'u Willk'i lies west of Kuntur Jiwaña.
