= Cairoma =

Cairoma K'ayruma
- Town
- Location within Bolivia
- Coordinates: 16°54′S 67°32′W
- Country: Bolivia
- Department: La Paz Department
- Province: José Ramón Loayza Province
- Municipality: Cairoma Municipality

Population (2001)
  - Total: 976
- Time zone: UTC-4 (BOT)

Cairoma (from Aymara K'ayruma) is a location in the La Paz Department in Bolivia. It is the seat of the Cairoma Municipality, the fifth municipal section of the José Ramón Loayza Province.
