= Malla Municipality =

Coordinates: 17°S 67.4167°W

- Municipality
- Flag
- Interactive map of Malla Municipality
- Country: Bolivia
- Department: La Paz Department
- Province: Loayza Province
- Seat: Malla
- Time zone: UTC-4 (BOT)

Malla Municipality is the fourth municipal section of the Loayza Province in the La Paz Department, Bolivia. Its seat is Malla.

== Geography ==
The Kimsa Cruz mountain range traverses the municipality. Some of the highest mountains of the municipality are listed below:

- Chuqi Tira
- Ch'api Ch'apini
- Iru Wasa
- Jach'a Qullu
- Jach'a Tira
- Janq'u Jaqhi
- Janq'u Qalani
- Kunturiri
- Llallawa
- Mach'a Yapu
- Malla Qullu
- Muruta
- Ñuñu Qullu
- Pukarani
- Pupusani
- P'iq'iñ Q'ara
- Qala Qala
- Qillqata
- Qullqiri
- Quri Ch'uma
- Quta K'uchu
- Quta Qutani
- Salla Sallani
- Tani Tani
- Turi Turini (NW of Malla Ch'uma)
- Turi Turini (SW of Malla Ch'uma)
- T'ula T'ulani
- Wallatani
- Wari Jarisiña
- Wathiya Quta
- Waylla Phutunqu
- Wila Quta
- Wila Willk'i
- Willk'i
- Wisk'achani
- Yaypuri

== See also ==
- Malla Jawira
