= Malla Jawira =

- Etymology: Aymara

Location
- Country: Bolivia
- Region: La Paz Department

Physical characteristics
- Source
  - location: Loayza Province, Malla Municipality
- Mouth: La Paz River
  - location: Loayza Province, Luribay Municipality

Basin features
- Tributaries
  - right: Jach'a K'uchu Jawira, Wila Jawira

Malla Jawira (Aymara malla lead, jawira river, "lead river", Hispanicized spelling Malla Jahuira) is a river in the La Paz Department in Bolivia. It is a right tributary of the Luribay River whose waters flow to the La Paz River.

Malla Jawira originates near the mountain León Jiwata of the Kimsa Cruz mountain range in the Loayza Province, Malla Municipality. At first, it flows to the southwest along the mountains named P'iq'iñ Q'ara and Malla Qullu, the little town of Malla and Qillqata where it turns to the northwest. Some of its affluents from the right are Wila Jawira and Jach'a K'uchu Jawira. The confluence with the Luribay River is within the Luribay Municipality near Wila Qura (Vilacora), north of Luribay.
