= Luribay =

Luribay Luriway
- Town
- Location within Bolivia
- Coordinates: 17°04′S 67°40′W
- Country: Bolivia
- Department: La Paz Department
- Province: José Ramón Loayza Province
- Municipality: Luribay Municipality

Population (2001)
  - Total: 434
- Time zone: UTC-4 (BOT)

Luribay (Aymara: Luriway) is a location in the La Paz Department in Bolivia. It is the seat of the Luribay Municipality, the first municipal section of the José Ramón Loayza Province, and of the province.

== Climate ==
Climate data for Luribay, elevation 2,510 m (8,230 ft), (1973–2011)
Month	Jan	Feb	Mar	Apr	May	Jun	Jul	Aug	Sep	Oct	Nov	Dec	Year
Mean daily maximum °C (°F)	26.2 (79.2)	26.4 (79.5)	26.8 (80.2)	27.0 (80.6)	26.3 (79.3)	25.3 (77.5)	24.7 (76.5)	25.3 (77.5)	25.8 (78.4)	27.2 (81.0)	27.7 (81.9)	27.2 (81.0)	26.3 (79.4)
Daily mean °C (°F)	19.4 (66.9)	19.5 (67.1)	19.6 (67.3)	19.0 (66.2)	17.4 (63.3)	16.2 (61.2)	15.7 (60.3)	16.6 (61.9)	17.8 (64.0)	19.2 (66.6)	20.0 (68.0)	19.9 (67.8)	18.4 (65.1)
Mean daily minimum °C (°F)	12.8 (55.0)	12.6 (54.7)	12.4 (54.3)	11.1 (52.0)	8.6 (47.5)	7.2 (45.0)	7.0 (44.6)	8.2 (46.8)	9.8 (49.6)	11.4 (52.5)	12.4 (54.3)	12.8 (55.0)	10.5 (50.9)
Average precipitation mm (inches)	86.4 (3.40)	53.4 (2.10)	42.2 (1.66)	12.1 (0.48)	4.8 (0.19)	3.8 (0.15)	5.5 (0.22)	8.6 (0.34)	15.1 (0.59)	16.0 (0.63)	30.3 (1.19)	60.2 (2.37)	338.4 (13.32)
Average precipitation days	15.0	10.6	8.6	3.2	1.4	1.1	1.2	2.2	4.0	3.9	5.3	10.2	66.7
Average relative humidity (%)	60.1	60.0	58.7	56.1	51.2	48.2	47.5	49.8	51.0	50.1	50.3	55.2	53.2
Source: Servicio Nacional de Meteorología e Hidrología de Bolivia
