= Taruja Umaña =

Mountain in Bolivia

- Location within Bolivia

Highest point
- Elevation: 4,852 m (15,919 ft)
- Coordinates: 16°49′04″S 67°31′33″W

Geography
- Location: Bolivia; La Paz Department, Loayza Province
- Parent range: Andes, Kimsa Cruz

Taruja Umaña (Aymara taruja deer, umaña drink, to give to drink, "deer watering place", also spelled Taruca Umaña, Taruca Umana), also known as Taruj Umaña according to the name of the river at the mountain, is a 4,852-metre-high (15,919 ft) mountain in the northern part of the Kimsa Cruz mountain range in the Bolivian Andes. It is situated in the La Paz Department, Loayza Province, Cairoma Municipality. Taruja Umaña lies west of the mountain Mama Uqllu.

The river Taruj Umaña which later is called Araca originates south-east of the mountain. It flows to the west and then to the north-west as an affluent of the La Paz River.
