= Malla, Bolivia =

Malla
- Town
- Location within Bolivia
- Coordinates: 17°02′S 67°27′W
- Country: Bolivia
- Department: La Paz Department
- Province: José Ramón Loayza Province
- Municipality: Malla Municipality

Population (2001)
  - Total: 876
- Time zone: UTC-4 (BOT)

Malla is a location in the La Paz Department in Bolivia. It is the seat of the Malla Municipality, the fourth municipal section of the José Ramón Loayza Province.
