= Quime Municipality =

Quime
- Municipality
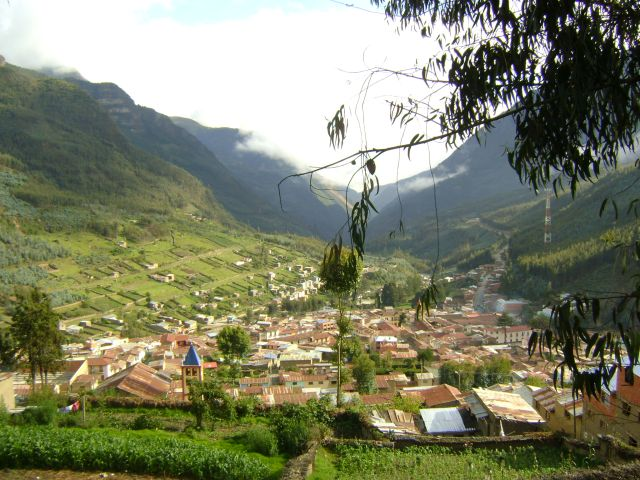
- Quime

- Coat of arms
- Nickname: Un lugar de descanso
- Motto: luchar hasta el final
- Location of the Quime Municipality within Bolivia
- Quime Municipality and its local surroundings
- Coordinates: 16°45′S 67°20′W
- Country: Bolivia
- Department: La Paz
- Province: Inquisivi
- Seat: Quime

Government
  - Type: Democratic
  - Mayor: Luis Gregorio Argollo Saravia (ASP, 2026)
  - Sub Mayor: Panfilo Marca

Area
  - Municipality: 997 km^{2} (385 sq mi)

Population (2024)
  - Municipality: 10,887
  - Density: 11/km^{2} (28/sq mi)
  - Urban: 4,473
  - Rural: 6,414
  - Indigenous ethnicities: Aymara: 6,135 (56%); Quechua: 226 (2%)
- 2024 Bolivian census
- Time zone: UTC-4 (BOT)
- Geocode: 021002 (INE code); BO021002 (OCHA P-code)

Quime Municipality is the second municipal section of the Inquisivi Province in the La Paz Department in Bolivia, located south-east of the city of La Paz. Its seat is Quime. The coordinates are 16° 59' 0" South, 67° 13' 0".

== Geography ==
There are three rivers nearby, the Quime River, Chanvillalla River, and Chichipata River. The Kimsa Cruz mountain range traverses the municipality.

== Division ==
The municipality consists of the following cantons:

- Choquetanga Canton - 2,537 inhabitants (2001)
- Figueroa Canton - 149 inhabitants
- Waña Quta Canton - 69 inhabitants
- Quime Canton - 4,583 inhabitants

== Notable peole ==
- Daisy Wende (1929–2025) - fashion designer

== See also ==
- Laram Quta
- Wallatani Lake
- Watir Quta
