= Loayza Province =

Loayza
- Province
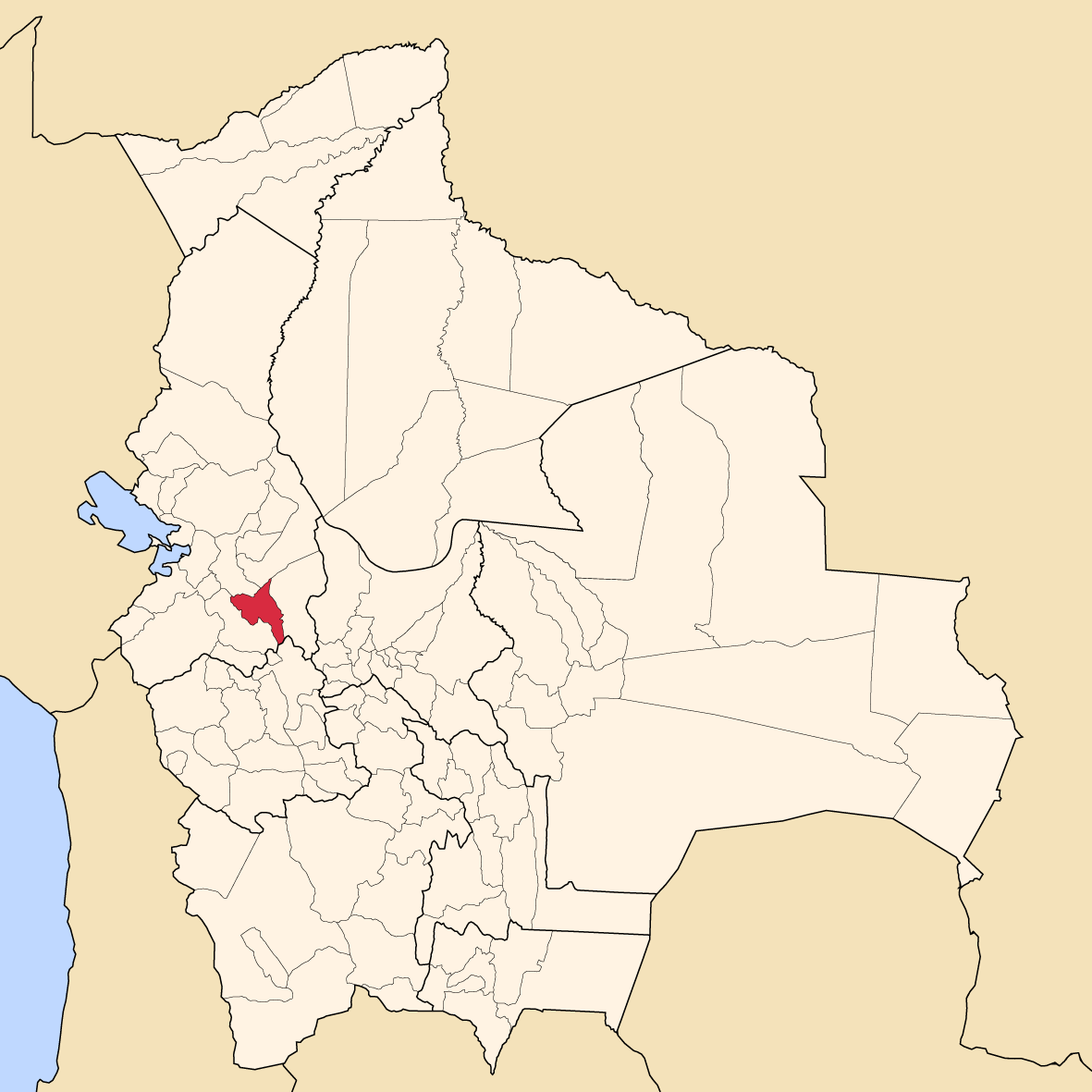
- Location of Loayza Province within Bolivia

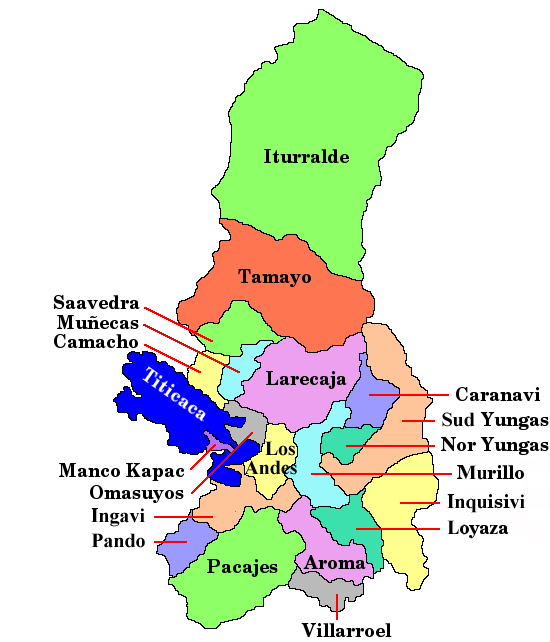
- Provinces of the La Paz Department
- Coordinates: 16°58′0″S 67°38′0″W
- Country: Bolivia
- Department: La Paz Department
- Municipalities: 5
- Capital: Puerto Acosta

Area
  - Total: 3,370 km^{2} (1,300 sq mi)

Population (2024 census)
  - Total: 57,827
  - Density: 17.2/km^{2} (44.4/sq mi)
- Time zone: UTC-4 (BOT)

Loayza or José Ramón Loayza is a province in the La Paz Department, Bolivia. Its seat is Luribay.

== Geography ==
The Kimsa Cruz mountain range traverses the province. Some of the highest mountains of the province are listed below:

- Achachi Qala
- Achachi Qala (Cairoma)
- Achuma
- Chullpani
- Chuqi Sillani
- Chuqi Sillani (Aroma-L.)
- Chuqi Tira
- Chuqisa
- Ch'api Ch'apini
- Ch'api Qullu
- Ch'apini
- Ch'iyar Quta
- Ch'utu Qullu
- Iru Wasa
- Jach'a Ch'apini
- Jach'a Ch'uñu Uma
- Jach'a Qullu
- Jach'a Qullu (Luribay)
- Jach'a Tira
- Jach'a Walluni
- Jach'a Wayllani
- Jach'a Willk'i
- Janq'u Jaqhi
- Janq'u Qala
- Janq'u Qalani
- Janq'u Qullu
- Janq'u Quta
- Janq'u Willk'i (Cairoma)
- Janq'u Willk'i (Luribay)
- Jisk'a Uma
- Jukumarini
- Kuntur Jiwaña
- Kunturiri
- K'ark'ani
- Laram Qullu
- Lawrani
- Liqiliqini
- Lluxita
- Mach'a Yapu
- Machaq Marka
- Malla Qullu
- Muqun Qullu
- Muruta
- Nasa Q'ara
- Nina Qullu
- Ñuñu Qullu
- Pichaqani
- Pukara
- Pukarani
- Pupusani
- P'iq'iñ Q'ara
- Qala Qala
- Qillqata
- Qillwan Quta
- Qullpani
- Qullqiri
- Quri Ch'uma
- Quta Qutani
- Qutani
- Quta K'uchu
- Q'ara Qullu
- Salla Sallani
- Suka Sukani
- Tani Tani
- Taruja Umaña
- Turi Turini (NW of Malla Ch'uma)
- Turi Turini (SW of Malla Ch'uma)
- Turini
- Turini (Loayza)
- T'ula T'ulani
- Uqi Chaka
- Urqu Jipiña
- Wallatani
- Wanuni
- Warin
- Wathiya Quta
- Wayllani
- Wayra Willk'i
- Wila Pukara
- Wila Quta
- Wila Willk'i
- Wila Willk'i (Cairoma)
- Willk'i
- Wiluqu
- Wisk'achani (Inquisivi-L.)
- Wisk'achani (Loayza)
- Wisk'achani (Luribay)
- Yaypuri

== Subdivision ==
The province is divided into five municipalities which are further subdivided into cantons.

Section	Municipality	Seat
1st	Luribay Municipality	Luribay
2nd	Sapahaqui Municipality	Sapahaqui
3rd	Yaco Municipality	Yaco
4th	Malla Municipality	Malla
5th	Cairoma Municipality	Cairoma

== See also ==
- Chillwa Quta
- Jach'a Jawira
- Malla Jawira
- Warus Quta
