= Cordillera Quimsa Cruz =

Mountain in Bolivia

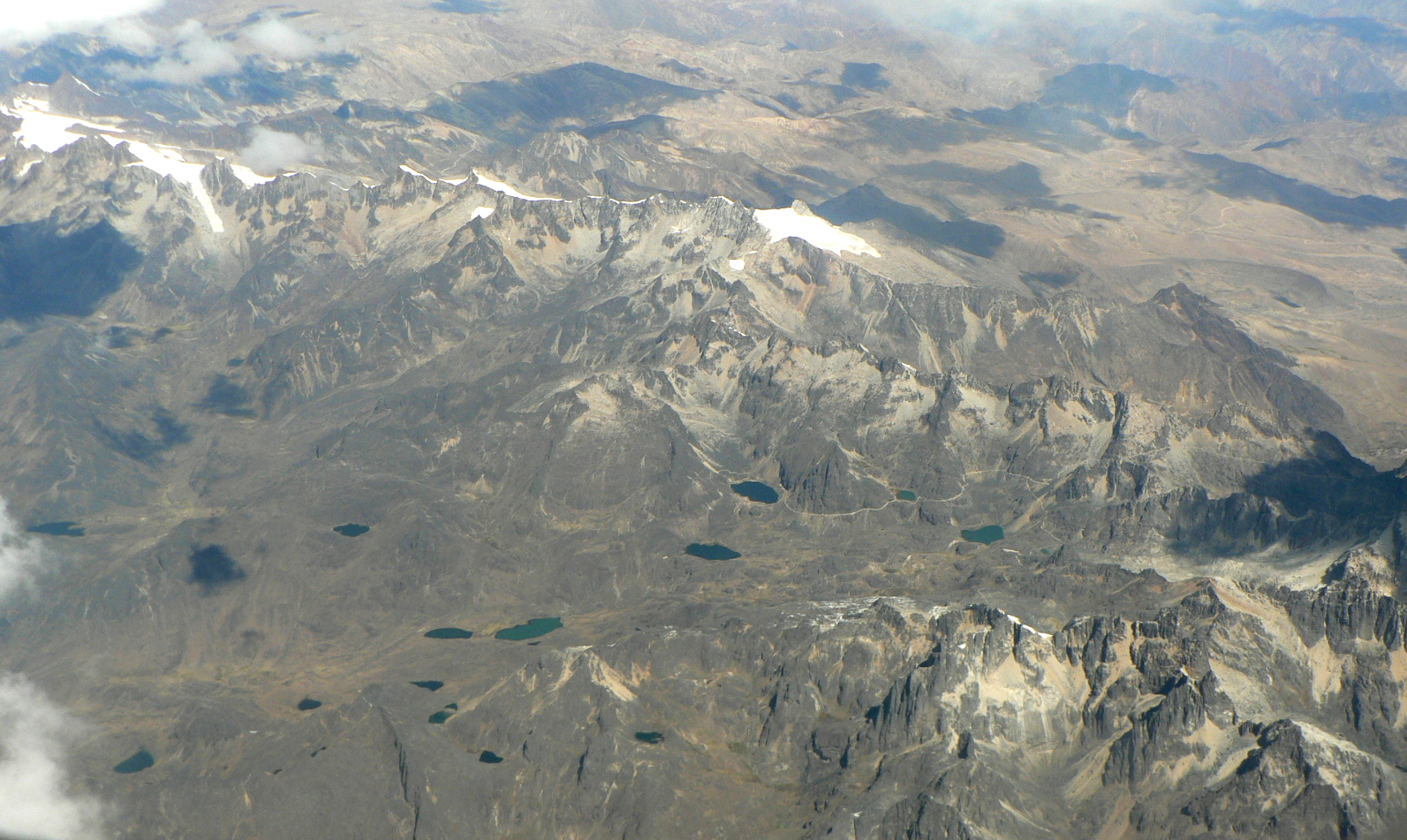
- Cordillera Quimsa Cruz as seen from North

Highest point
- Peak: Jach'a Khunu Qullu
- Elevation: 19,029 ft (5,800 m)
- Coordinates: 17°0′S 67°20′W

Dimensions
- Length: 35 km (22 mi)
- Width: 12 km (7.5 mi)

Geography
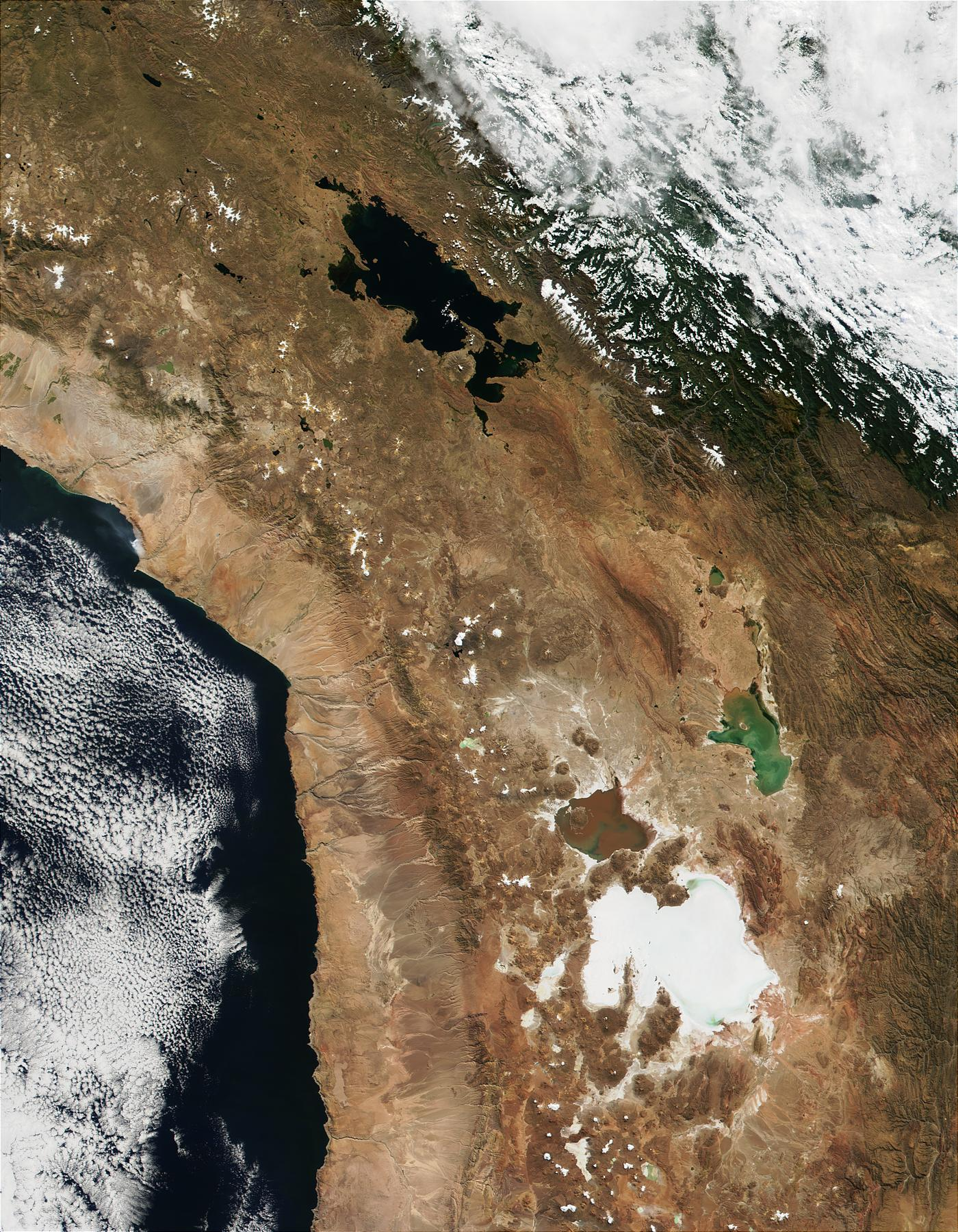
- The Cordillera Quimsa Cruz is situated south-east of Lake Titicaca and north of Lake Uru Uru
- Country: Bolivia
- Region: Altiplano
- Range coordinates: 17°00′S 67°10′W
- Parent range: Andes

Geology
- Rock type: granite

The Cordillera Quimsa Cruz is a mountain range in the La Paz Department in Bolivia situated south east of Lake Titicaca and north of Uru Uru Lake, measuring about 35–40 km in length and 12 km at its widest point. It is the continuation of the Cordillera Real of Bolivia extending in a north to south-eastern direction from Asiento pass south of Illimani to Tres Cruces pass.

Kimsa Cruz or Quimsa Cruz in Hispanicized spelling is a partly Aymara (kimsa three), partly Spanish (cruz cross) expression meaning "three crosses".

== Mountains ==
The highest elevations are Jachacunocollo (5,800 m), Wayna Khunu Qullu (5,640 m) and Gigante (5,748 m). Other notable peaks are:

- León Jiwata, 5,680 metres (18,635 ft)
- San Luis, 5,620 metres (18,438 ft)
- Las Virgenes, 5,600 metres (18,373 ft)
- San Pedro, 5,590 metres (18,340 ft)
- Yaypuri, 5,566 metres (18,261 ft)
- Salvador Apacheta, 5,565 metres (18,258 ft)
- Jach'a Paquni, 5,560 metres (18,241 ft)
- San Enrique, 5,620 metres (18,438 ft)
- Atoroma, 5,550 metres (18,209 ft)
- Santa Fe, 5,550 metres (18,209 ft)
- San Juan, 5,540 metres (18,176 ft)
- San Lorenzo, 5,508 metres (18,071 ft)
- Janq'u Qullu, 5,460 metres (17,913 ft)
- La Salvadora, 5,421 metres (17,785 ft)
- Yunque, 5,400 metres (17,717 ft)
- Wila Qullu, 5,400 metres (17,717 ft)
- Nina Qullu, 5,352 metres (17,559 ft)
- Ch'amak Qullu, 5,350 metres (17,552 ft)
- Wallatani, 5,336 metres (17,507 ft)
- Quri Ch'uma, 5,312 metres (17,428 ft)
- Gerhard, 5,404 metres (17,730 ft)
- Los Enanos, 5,300 metres (17,388 ft)
- Mama Uqllu, 5,281 metres (17,326 ft)
- Cuernos de Diablo, 5,271 metres (17,293 ft)
- Chhankaphiña, 5,260 metres (17,257 ft)
- Santa Vera Cruz, 5,210 metres (17,093 ft)
- Pireo, 5,200 metres (17,060 ft)
- Janq'u Quta, 5,090 metres (16,699 ft)
- Achuma, 4,960 metres (16,273 ft)
- Ch'uxña Quta, 4,920 metres (16,142 ft)
- Taruja Umaña, 4,852 metres (15,919 ft)
- Janq'u Willk'i, 4,800 metres (15,748 ft)
- Kunturiri
- Laram Quta
- Malla Ch'uma

== See also ==
- Itapalluni
- Wisk'achani
