= Luribay Municipality =

- Municipality
- Location of the Luribay Municipality within Bolivia
- Coordinates: 17°0′0″S 67°35′0″W
- Country: Bolivia
- Department: La Paz Department
- Province: Loayza Province
- Seat: Luribay

Area
  - Total: 195.5 sq mi (506.3 km^{2})
- Elevation: 9,800 ft (3,000 m)

Population (2024)
  - Total: 10,703
- Time zone: UTC-4 (BOT)

Luribay Municipality is the first municipal section of the Loayza Province in the La Paz Department of Bolivia. Encompassing an area of approximately 506.3 km^{2} (195.5 sq mi), it had a population of 10,703 in March 2024. The town of Luribay serves as the administrative center of the municipality. Situated in the inter-Andean valleys, it is characterized by a dry climate and fertile soils, making it particularly suitable for certain agricultural activities and known for its wine and singani production.

== History ==
Luribay's history is deeply intertwined with the development of viticulture in Bolivia. The cultivation of grapes and the production of wine in Luribay date back to the colonial period. It was briefly suspended before being regrown since land ownership reforms in the mid 20th century.

== Geography ==
The municipality spans about 506.3 km^{2} (195.5 sq mi) within the Loayza Province in the La Paz Department. The district consists of the main urban center of the town of Luribay and multiple villages. It is situated in the Interandean Valles, a geographical zone between the higher altitudes of the Altiplano and the lower tropical plains in the Andes. The municipality is part of a region known for its fertile soils and fruit cultivation. The municipality incorporates several hills, and the town of Luribay is located at 2,546 m (8,353 ft).

== Demographics ==
Encompassing an area of approximately 506.3 km^{2} (195.5 sq mi), the district had a population of 10,703 in March 2024. The population consisted of 5,464 males, and 5,239 females. Spanish language was the most spoken language. The economy is predominantly agricultural, with diverse crop cultivation. In addition to wine, Luribay is also known for producing singani, a traditional Bolivian grape brandy.

== See also ==
- Malla Jawira
