= Mayoral elections in Santa Ana, California =

Elections are currently held every two years to elect the mayor of Santa Ana, California.

== 2000 ==
2000 Santa Ana mayoral election
- November 7, 2000
- Turnout: 63.4%
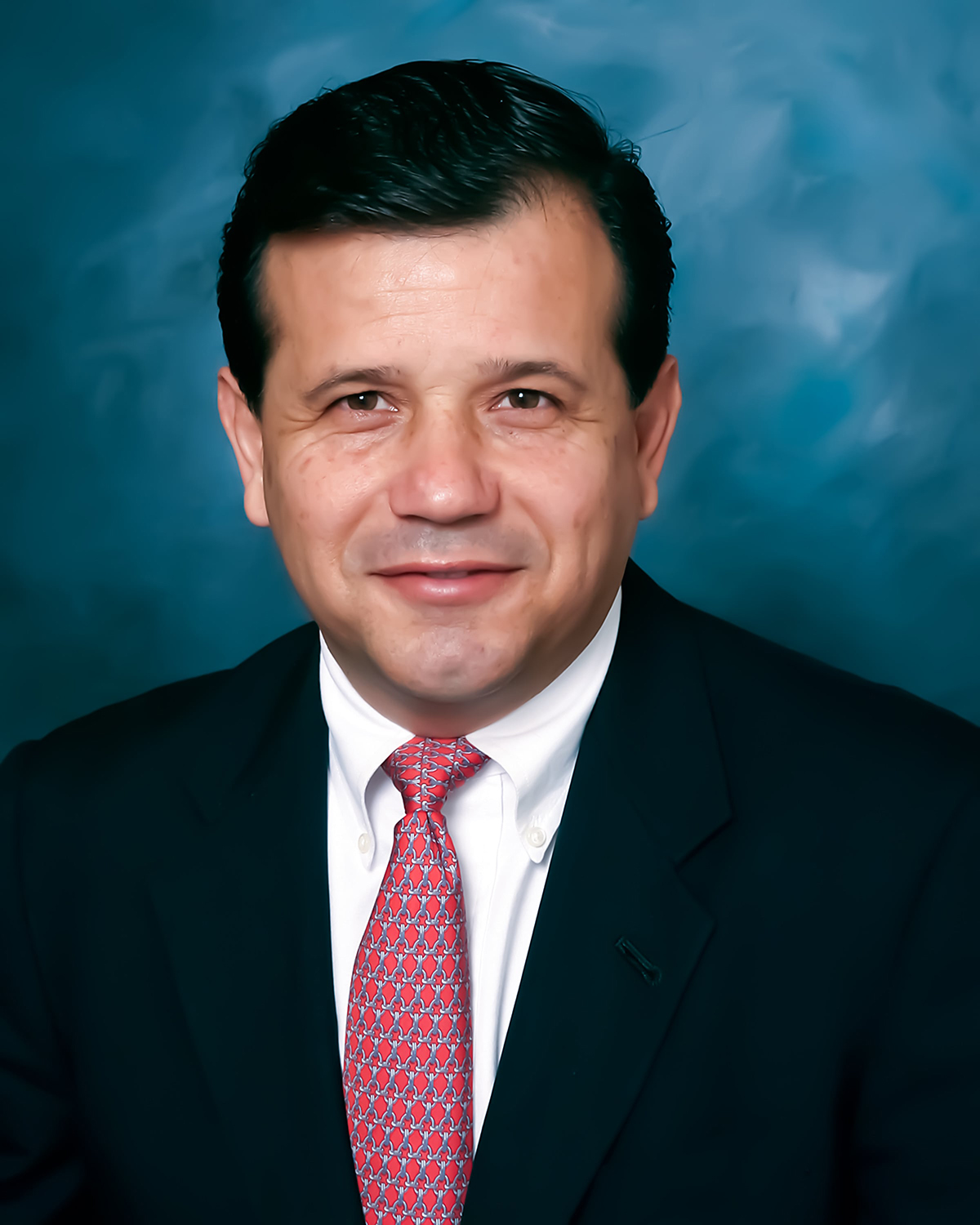
Candidate	Miguel A. Pulido	Vital d'Caprio
Popular vote	34,102	8,025
Percentage	80.95%	19.05%
Mayor before election
Miguel A. Pulido
Elected mayor
Miguel A. Pulido

The 2000 Santa Ana mayoral election took place on November 7, 2000. Incumbent mayor Miguel A. Pulido won reelection to a fourth term.

Election results
Candidate	Votes	%
Miguel A. Pulido	34,102	80.95
Vital d'Caprio	8,025	19.05
Total votes	42,127	100

== 2002 ==
The 2002 Santa Ana mayoral election took place on November 5, 2002. Incumbent mayor Miguel A. Pulido won the election by default, as he ran unopposed.

== 2004 ==
2004 Santa Ana mayoral election
- November 2, 2004
- Turnout: 60.4%
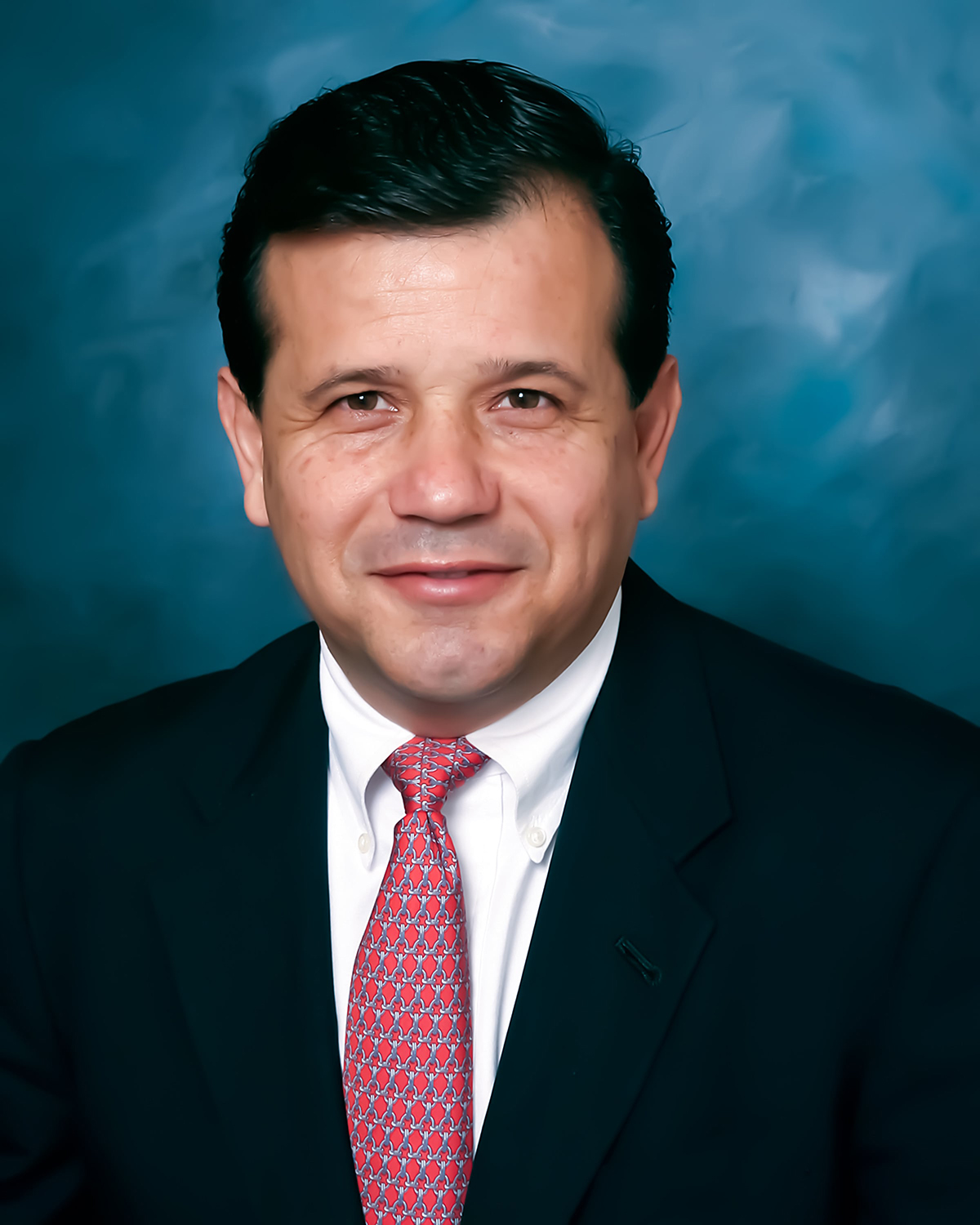
Candidate	Miguel A. Pulido	Stanley Fiala
Popular vote	38,634	9,327
Percentage	80.55%	19.45%
Mayor before election
Miguel A. Pulido
Elected mayor
Miguel A. Pulido

The 2004 Santa Ana mayoral election took place on November 2, 2004. Incumbent mayor Miguel A. Pulido won reelection to a sixth term.

Election results
Candidate	Votes	%
Miguel A. Pulido	38,634	80.55
Stanley Fiala	9,327	19.45
Total votes	47,961	100

== 2006 ==
2006 Santa Ana mayoral election
- November 7, 2006
- Turnout: 41.0%
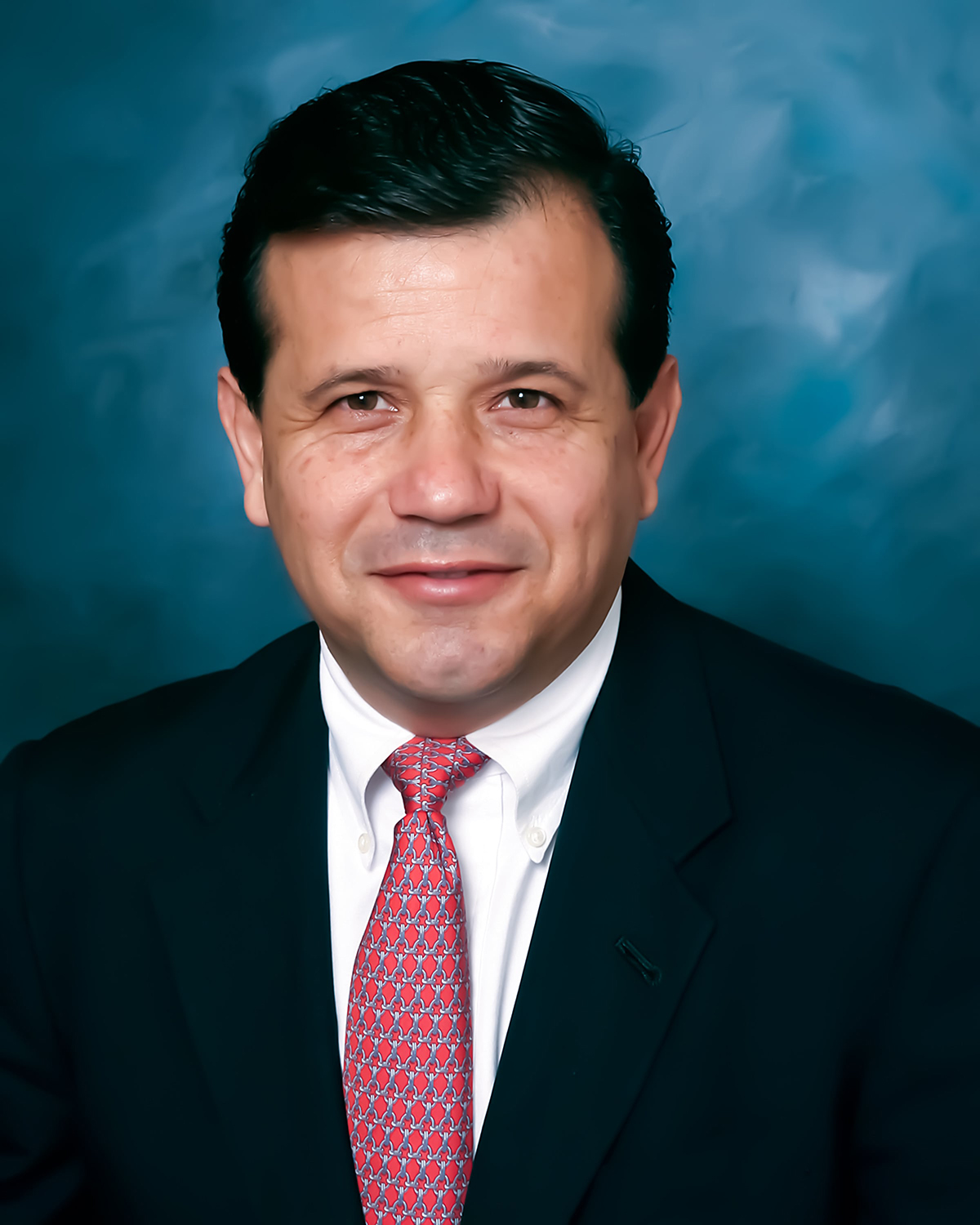
Candidate	Miguel A. Pulido	Thomas A. Gordon	Stanley Fiala
Popular vote	23,170	8,262	2,259
Percentage	68.77%	24.52%	6.71%
Mayor before election
Miguel A. Pulido
Democrat
Elected mayor
Miguel A. Pulido
Democrat

The 2006 Santa Ana mayoral election was held on November 7, 2006. The election was won by the incumbent mayor Miguel A. Pulido.

Election results
Candidate	Votes	%
Miguel A. Pulido	23,170	68.77
Thomas A. Gordon	8,262	24.52
Stanley Fiala	2,259	6.71
Total votes	33,691	100

== 2008 ==
2008 Santa Ana mayoral election
- November 4, 2008
- Turnout: 60.4%
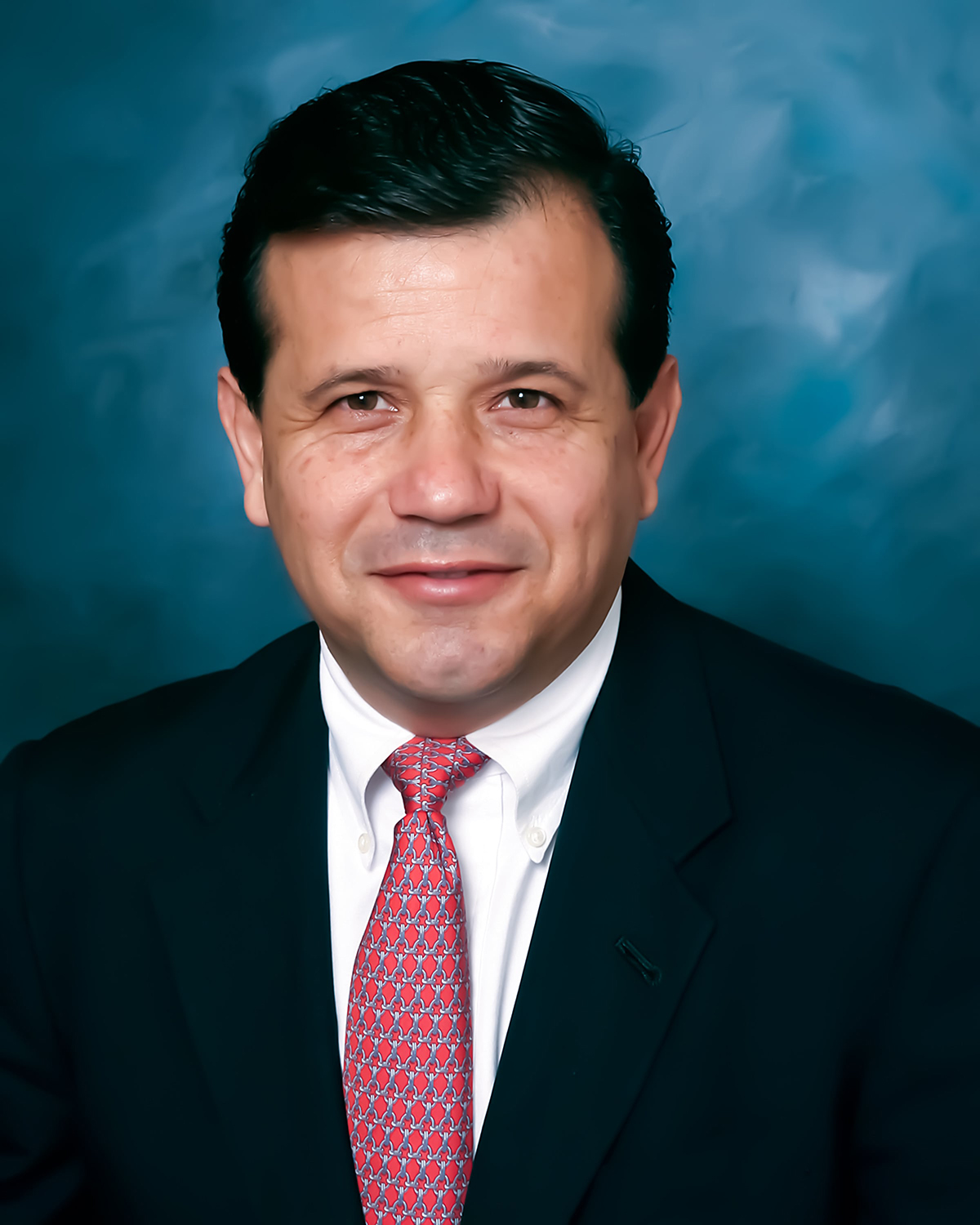
Candidate	Miguel A. Pulido	Michele Martinez
Popular vote	30,352	16,199
Percentage	54.96%	29.33%
Candidate	George M. Collins	Stanley Fiala
Popular vote	7,610	1,069
Percentage	13.78%	1.93%
Mayor before election
Miguel A. Pulido
Elected mayor
Miguel A. Pulido

The 2008 Santa Ana mayoral election took place on November 4, 2008. The election was won by the incumbent mayor Miguel A. Pulido.

Election results
Candidate	Votes	%
Miguel A. Pulido	30,352	54.96
Michele Martinez	16,199	29.33
George M. Collins	7,610	13.78
Stanley Fiala	1,069	1.93
Total votes	55,230	100

== 2010 ==
2010 Santa Ana mayoral election
- November 2, 2010
- Turnout: 44.3%
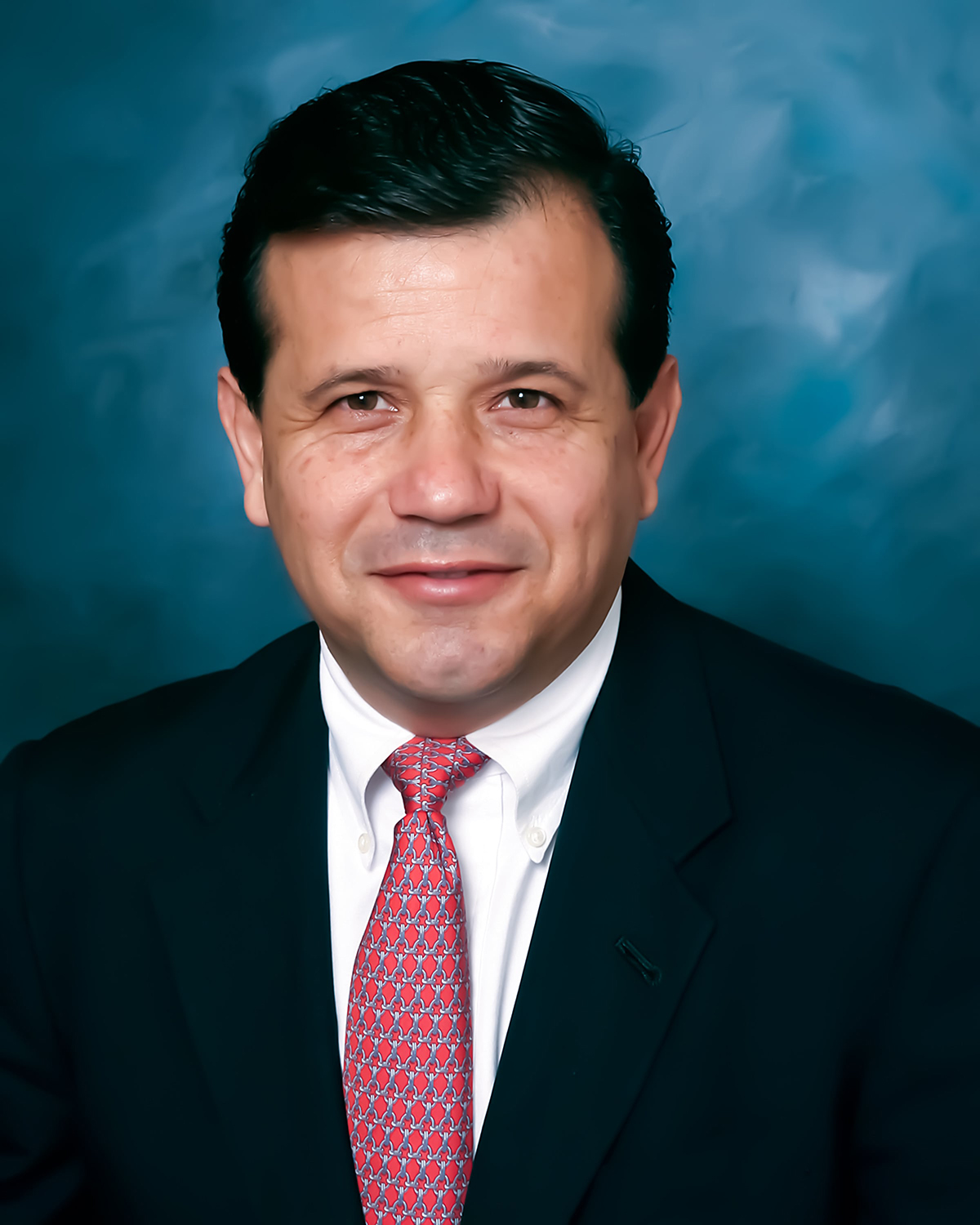
Candidate	Miguel A. Pulido	Alfredo Amezcua
Popular vote	21,588	11,689
Percentage	49.45%	26.78%
Candidate	Charles Hart	George M. Collins
Popular vote	4,216	3,820
Percentage	9.66%	8.75%
Mayor before election
Miguel A. Pulido
Elected mayor
Miguel A. Pulido

The 2010 Santa Ana mayoral election was held on November 2, 2010. Incumbent mayor Miguel A. Pulido won reelection.

Election results
Candidate	Votes	%
Miguel A. Pulido	21,588	49.45
Alfredo Amezcua	11,689	26.78
Charles Hart	4,216	9.66
George M. Collins	3,820	8.75
Roy Alvarado	2,339	5.36
Total votes	43,652	100

== 2012 ==
2012 Santa Ana mayoral election
- November 6, 2012
- Turnout: 54.6%
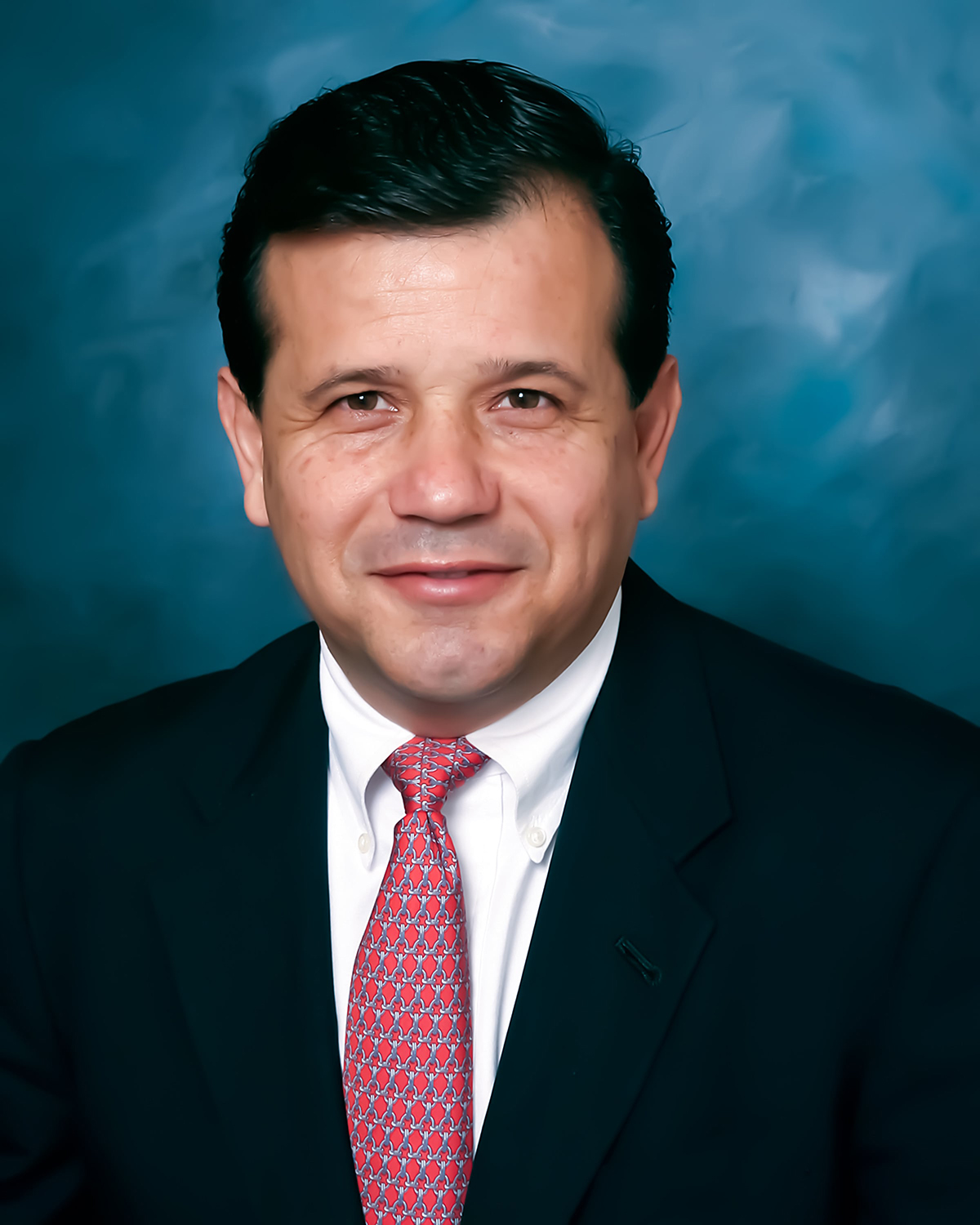
Candidate	Miguel A. Pulido	P. David Benavides
Popular vote	27,092	14,995
Percentage	48.18%	26.67%
Candidate	George M. Collins	Lupe Mureno
Popular vote	6,289	3,147
Percentage	11.18%	5.60%
- Results by city council district Pulido: 40–50% 50–60%
Mayor before election
Miguel A. Pulido
Elected mayor
Miguel A. Pulido

The 2012 Santa Ana mayoral election occurred on November 6, 2012. Incumbent mayor Miguel A. Pulido won reelection to a tenth term.

Election results
Candidate	Votes	%
Miguel A. Pulido	27,092	48.18
P. David Benavides	14,995	26.67
George M. Collins	6,289	11.18
Lupe Moreno	3,147	5.60
Roy Alvarado	3,082	5.48
Miguel Angel Briseno	1,626	2.89
Total votes	56,231	100

== 2014 ==
2014 Santa Ana mayoral election
- November 4, 2014
- Turnout: 38.8%
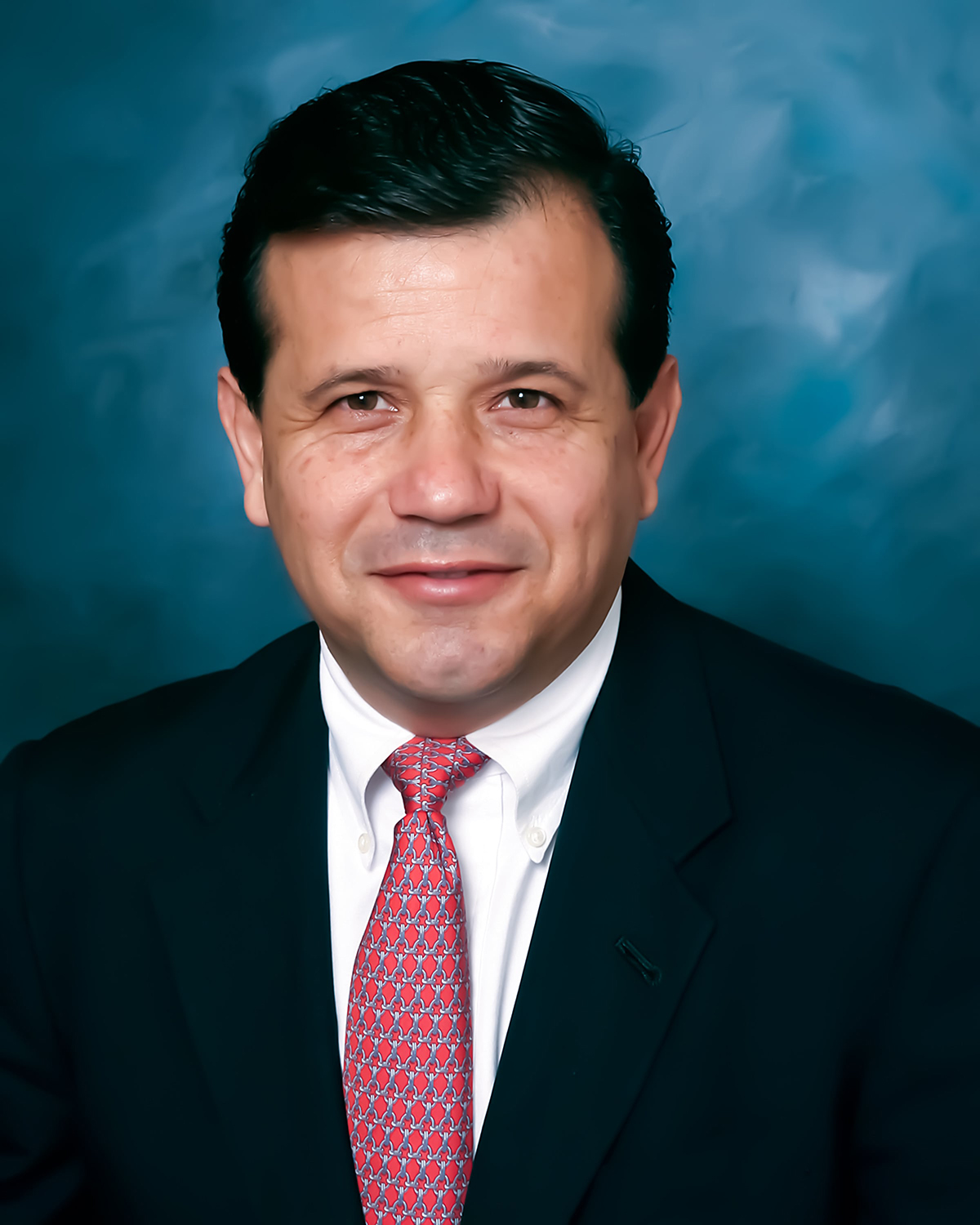
Candidate	Miguel A. Pulido	Roman Reyna
Popular vote	16,608	11,477
Percentage	50.07%	34.60%
Candidate	Mark I. Lopez	Laura Perez
Popular vote	5,000	85
Percentage	15.07%	0.26%
- Results by city council district Pulido: 40–50% 50–60% Pulido/Reyna tie: 40–50%
Mayor before election
Miguel A. Pulido
Elected mayor
Miguel A. Pulido

The 2014 Santa Ana mayoral election took place on November 4, 2014. Incumbent mayor Miguel A. Pulido was reelected.

Election results
Candidate	Votes	%
Miguel A. Pulido	16,608	50.07
Roman Reyna	11,477	34.60
Mark I. Lopez	5,000	15.07
Laura Perez	85	0.26
Total votes	33,170	100

== 2016 ==
2016 Santa Ana mayoral election
- November 8, 2016
- Turnout: 73.8%
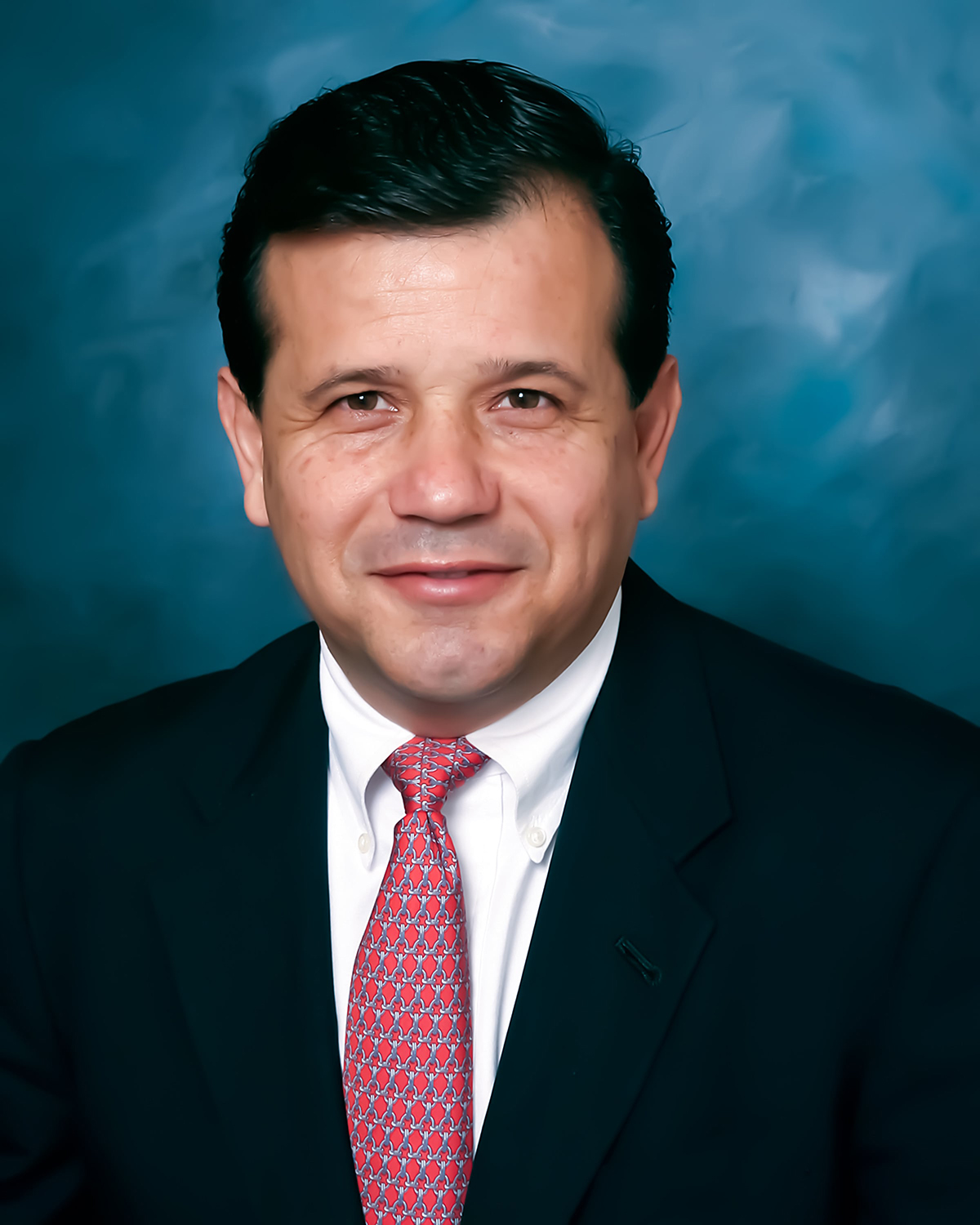
Candidate	Miguel A. Pulido	Benjamin Vazquez	Steve Rocco
Popular vote	34,317	24,576	8,774
Percentage	50.71%	36.32%	12.97%
- Results by city council district Pulido: 40–50% 50–60%
Mayor before election
Miguel A. Pulido
Elected mayor
Miguel A. Pulido

The 2016 Santa Ana mayoral election was held on November 8, 2016. Miguel A. Pulido, the incumbent mayor, won reelection to a twelfth term.

Election results
Candidate	Votes	%
Miguel A. Pulido	34,317	50.71
Benjamin Vazquez	24,576	36.32
Steve Rocco	8,774	12.97
Total votes	67,667	100

== 2018 ==
2018 Santa Ana mayoral election
- November 6, 2018
- Turnout: 59.3%
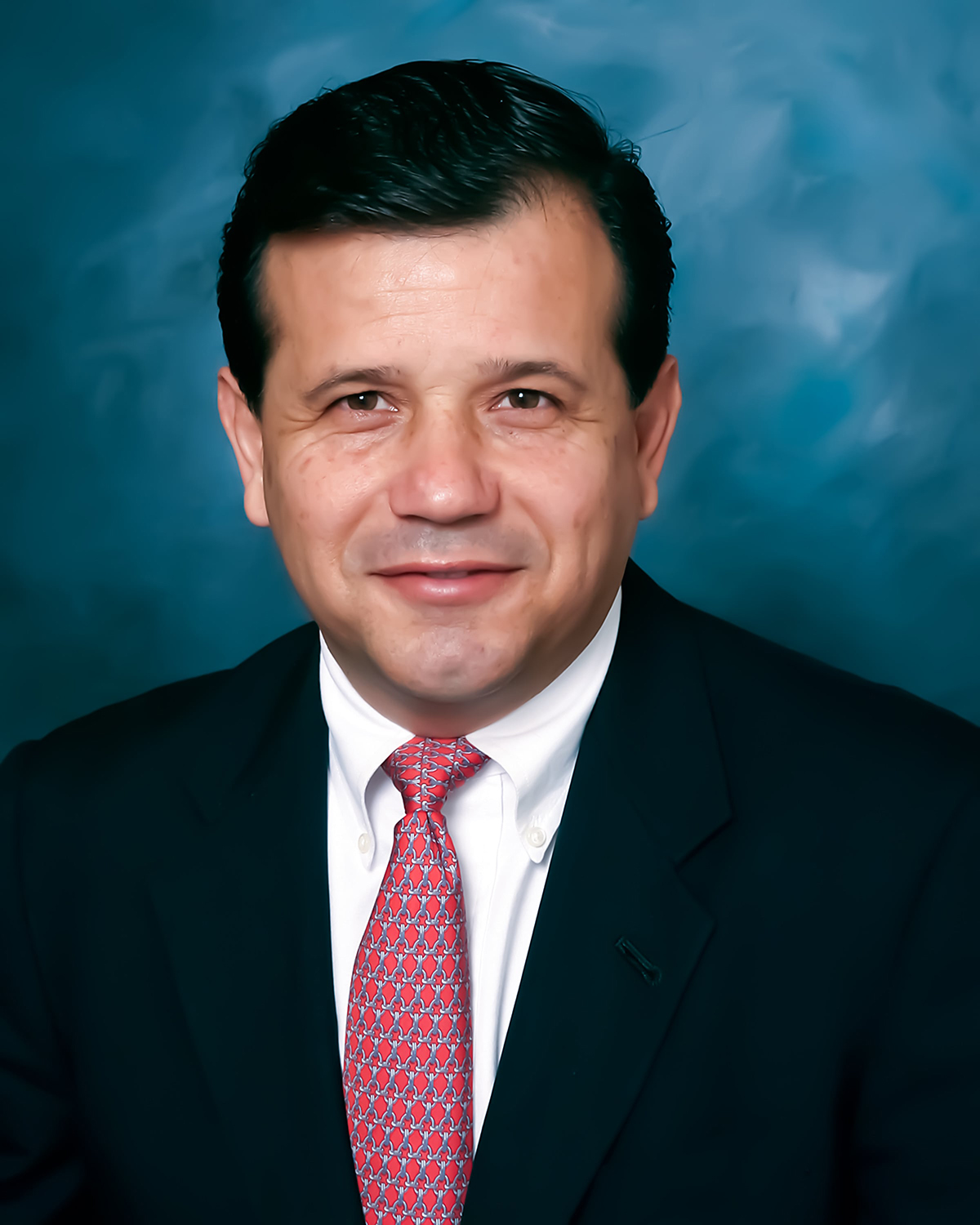
Candidate	Miguel A. Pulido	Sal Tinajero
Popular vote	28,360	27,674
Percentage	50.61%	49.39%
- Results by city council district Pulido: 50–60% Tinajero: 50–60%
Mayor before election
Miguel A. Pulido
Elected mayor
Miguel A. Pulido

The 2018 Santa Ana mayoral election took place on November 6, 2018. Miguel A. Pulido, the incumbent mayor, was reelected to another term.

Election results
Candidate	Votes	%
Miguel A. Pulido	28,360	50.61
Sal Tinajero	27,674	49.39
Total votes	56,034	100

== 2020 ==
2020 Santa Ana mayoral election
- November 3, 2020
- Turnout: 79.1%
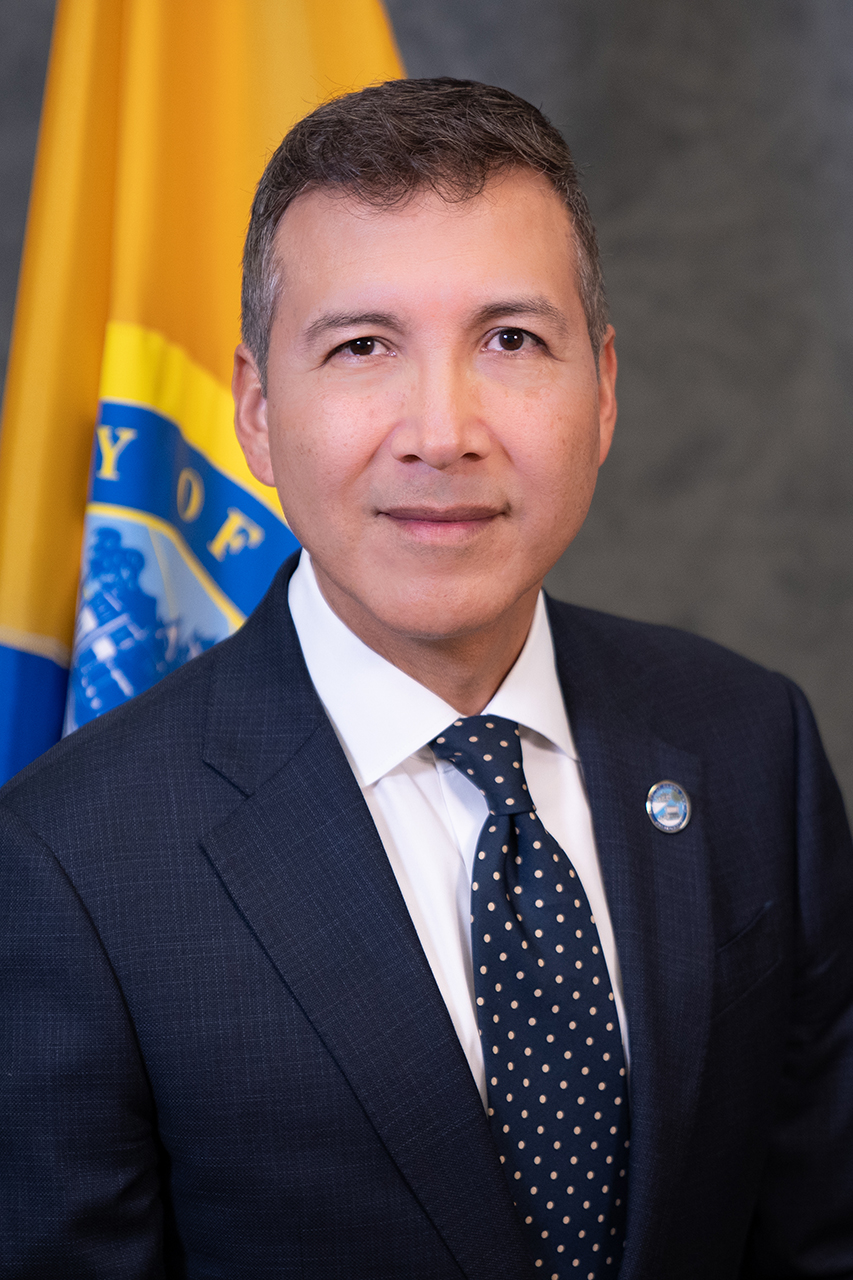
Candidate	Vicente Sarmiento	Claudia C. Alvarez
Popular vote	29,493	19,247
Percentage	33.06%	21.58%
Candidate	Cecillia Iglesias	Jose Solorio
Popular vote	18,713	14,585
Percentage	20.98%	16.35%
- Results by city council district Sarmiento: 30–40%
Mayor before election
Miguel A. Pulido
Elected mayor
Vicente Sarmiento

The 2020 Santa Ana mayoral election took place on November 3, 2020. Vicente Sarmiento, a member of the Santa Ana City Council, was elected as mayor.

Election results
Candidate	Votes	%
Vicente Sarmiento	29,493	33.06
Claudia C. Alvarez	19,247	21.58
Cecilla Iglesias	18,713	20.98
Jose Solorio	14,585	16.35
George M. Collins	5,217	5.85
Mark I. Lopez	1,950	2.18
Total votes	89,205	100

== 2022 ==
2022 Santa Ana mayoral election
- November 8, 2022
- Turnout: 36.1%
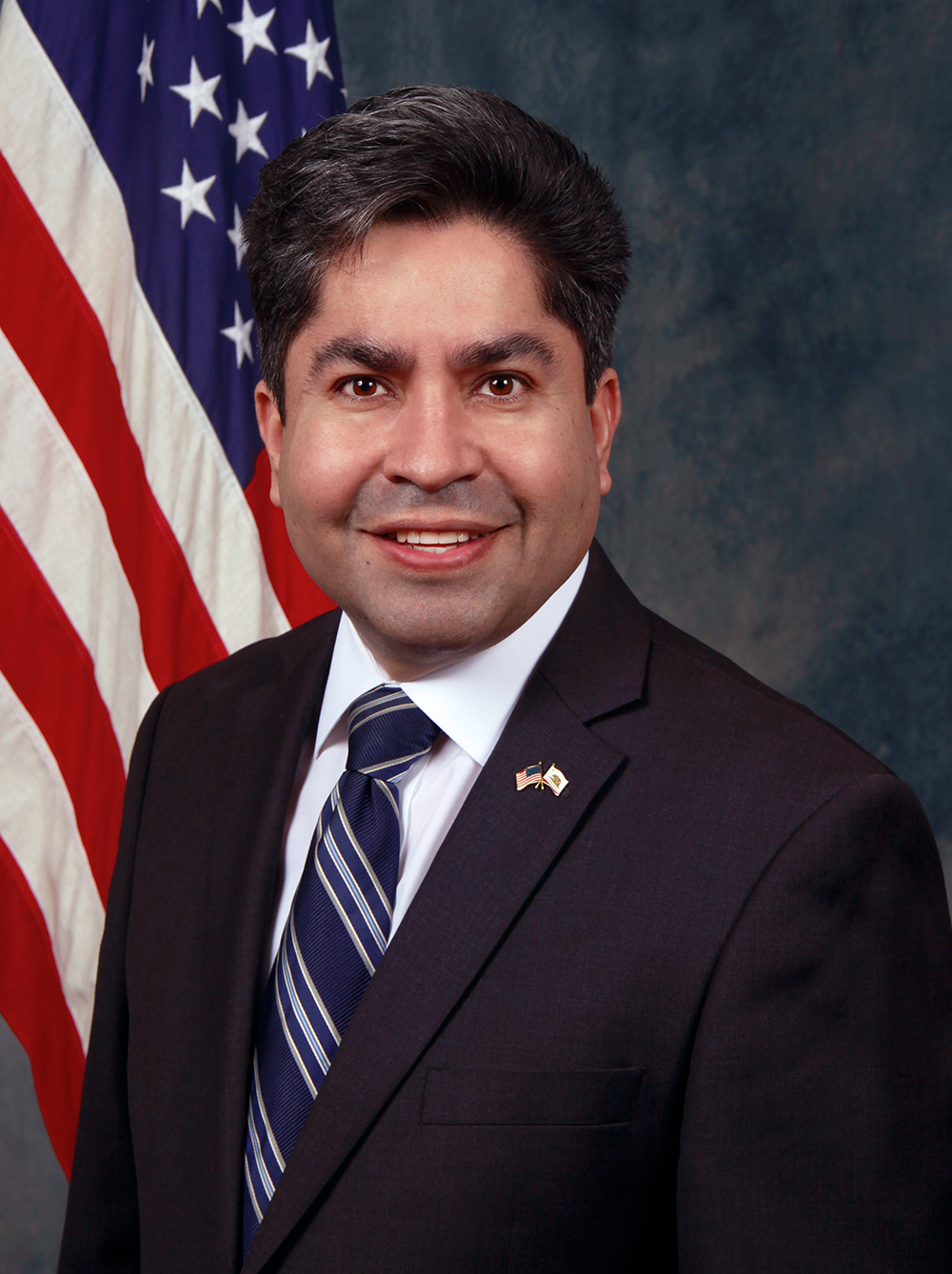
Candidate	Valerie Amezcua	Jose Solorio
Popular vote	16,095	11,507
Percentage	38.47%	27.50%
Candidate	Sal Tinajero	Jesse Nestor
Popular vote	11,078	3,162
Percentage	26.48%	7.56%
- Results by city council district Amezcua: 30–40% 40–50%
Mayor before election
Vicente Sarmiento
Elected mayor
Valerie Amezcua

The 2022 Santa Ana mayoral election took place on November 8, 2022. Valerie Amezucua, a member of the Santa Ana Unified School District Board, was elected as mayor.

Election results
Candidate	Votes	%
Valerie Amezcua	16,095	38.47
Jose Solorio	11,507	27.50
Sal Tinajero	11,078	26.47
Jesse Nestor	3,162	7.56
Total votes	41,842	100

== 2024 ==
2024 Santa Ana mayoral election
- November 5, 2024
- Turnout: 61.5%
Candidate	Valerie Amezcua	Benjamin Vazquez
Popular vote	44,785	29,948
Percentage	59.9%	40.1%

The 2024 Santa Ana mayoral election took place on November 5. Valerie Amezucua won a second term after being elected as mayor of Santa Ana.

Election results
Candidate	Votes	%
Valerie Amezcua	44,785	59.9
Benjamin Vazquez	29,958	40.1
Total votes	74,743	100

== 2026 ==
2026 Santa Ana mayoral election
- November 3, 2026
Candidate	Dan Shimell	Valerie Amezcua	Dwayne Shipp
Popular vote	32,162	27,176	8,998
Percentage	47.06%	39.77%	13.17%
Mayor before election
Valerie Amezcua
Elected mayor
Dan Shimell

The 2026 Santa Ana mayoral election was held on November 3, 2026. Valerie Amezucua was running for a third term as mayor of Santa Ana, but she lost a election to progressive-backed attorney Dan Shimell.

Election results
Candidate	Votes	%
Dan Shimell	32,320	47.08
Valerie Amezcua (incumbent)	27,276	39.73
Dwayne Shipp	9,049	13.18
Total votes	68,645	100.0
