= Vicente Sarmiento =

Bolivian American politician

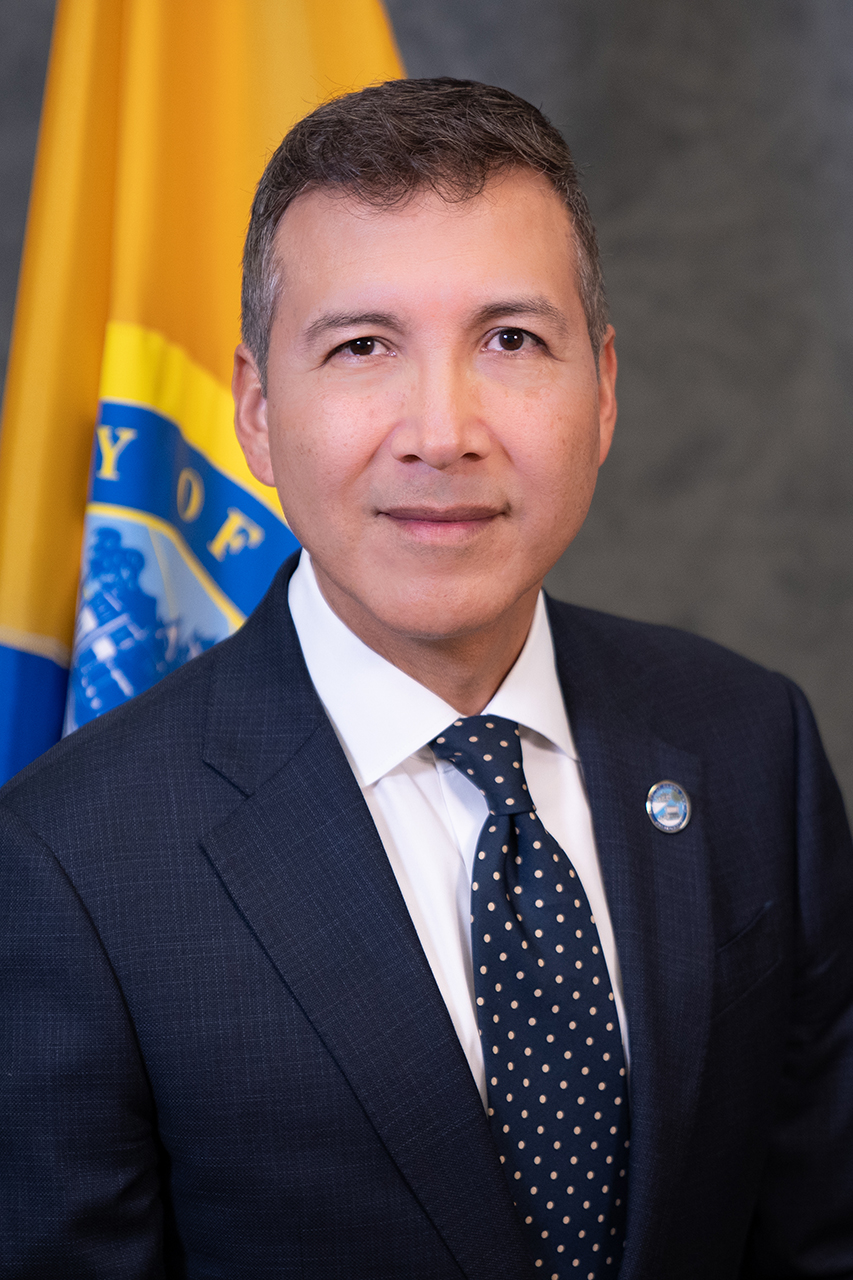
- Official portrait, 2020

Member of the Orange County Board of Supervisors from the 2nd district
- Incumbent
- Assumed office January 10, 2023
- Preceded by: Katrina Foley (redistricted)

Mayor of Santa Ana
- In office December 8, 2020 – December 13, 2022
- Preceded by: Miguel A. Pulido
- Succeeded by: Valerie Amezcua

Santa Ana City Councilmember from Ward 1
- In office January 2007 – December 8, 2020
- Appointed by: Miguel A. Pulido
- Preceded by: Jose Solorio
- Succeeded by: Thai Viet Phan

Personal details
- Born: Vicente Flavio Sarmiento; May 11, 1964 (age 61) Quime, La Paz, Bolivia
- Party: Democratic
- Spouse: Eva Cazas
- Children: Adrián; Diego; Dalia
- Parent(s): Vicente Sarmiento Sr. Irma Sarmiento
- Education: University of California, Berkeley (BEc); University of California, Los Angeles, School of Law (JD); Harvard Kennedy School

Vicente Flavio Sarmiento (Note: Occasionally translated "Vincent Sarmiento".) (born May 11, 1964) is a Bolivian-born American economist, lawyer, and politician serving as a member of the Orange County Board of Supervisors from the 2nd district since 2023. He was previously the mayor of Santa Ana from 2020 to 2022. A member of the Democratic Party, he previously served as City Councilmember representing Ward 1 from 2007 to 2020. Hailing from Quime in Bolivia's La Paz Department, he is credited as the first-ever Bolivian American mayor in the United States.

== Early life and education ==
Vicente Sarmiento was born on May 11, 1964, in Quime in the Inquisivi province of La Paz, Bolivia to Vicente Sr. and his wife Irma. When he was a year old, his family emigrated to California, settling in Santa Ana where his father worked as a hotel waiter while his mother provided cleaning services.

He studied at the University of California, Berkeley, where he met his wife Eva Cazas, an attorney of Mexican descent. He graduated from Berkeley with a Bachelor of Science Economics before continuing his studies at the University of California, Los Angeles, School of Law where he received his Juris Doctor. After that, he completed a Certificate Program for Senior Executives in State and Local Government at the Harvard Kennedy School of Government.

== Political career ==
In 1994, Sarmiento's father introduced him to Miguel A. Pulido, whose Santa Ana mayoral campaign he worked to support. After successfully being elected, Pulido appointed Sarmiento as the city's housing development commissioner. In January 2007, he was appointed to the Santa Ana City Council representing Ward 1 in order to complete the term of Jose Solorio who had been elected to the California State Assembly. The following year, he ran for a full term and was elected with 62.7% of the vote. He was reelected in 2012 and 2016.

Sarmiento launched his mayoral bid in 2020, running amongst a field of five other candidates seeking to replace term-limited Mayor Pulido. His campaign ran on housing affordability and ending the city's contract with ICE. In the November 3 vote, Sarmiento was elected mayor with 33% of the vote, beating out second-place Claudia Alvarez by 10,000 votes. Sarmiento's bid was largely supported by younger voters whom he credited as the reason for his electoral success. On December 8, 2020, he was inaugurated as the first new mayor of Santa Ana in 26 years.

== Electoral history ==
2008 Santa Ana Ward 1 City Council election
Candidate	Votes	%
Vicente Sarmiento	32,768	62.70
Jim Walker	19,490	37.30
Total	52,258	100.00
Source: Orange County Elections

2012 Santa Ana Ward 1 City Council election
Candidate	Votes	%
Vicente Sarmiento	27,289	51.96
Estela Amezcua	25,230	48.04
Total	52,519	100.00
Source: Orange County Elections

2016 Santa Ana Ward 1 City Council election
Candidate	Votes	%
Vicente Sarmiento	36,486	55.56
Jessica Cha	29,183	44.44
Total	65,669	100.00
Source: Orange County Elections

2020 Santa Ana mayoral election
Candidate	Votes	%
Vicente Sarmiento	29,493	33.06
Claudia Alvarez	19,247	21.58
Cecilia Iglesias	18,713	20.98
Jose Solorio	14,585	16.35
George Collins	5,217	5.85
Mark Lopez	1,950	2.19
Total	89,205	100.00
Source: Official election results

2022 Orange County Board of Supervisors District 2 General election
Candidate	Votes	%
Vicente Sarmiento	21,916	35.05
Kim Bernice Nguyen	13,923	22.27
Cecilia Iglesias	10,635	17.01
Jon Dumitru	10,321	16.51
Juan Villegas	5,733	9.17
Total	62,528	100.00
Source: Official election results

2022 Orange County Board of Supervisors District 2 Runoff election
Candidate	Votes	%
Vicente Sarmiento	48,923	51.62
Kim Bernice Nguyen	45,854	48.38
Total	94,777	100.00
Source: Official election results

Civic offices
Vacant Title last held by Jose Solorio	Santa Ana City Councilmember from Ward 1; 2007–2020	Succeeded by Thai Viet Phan
Political offices
Preceded by Miguel A. Pulido	Mayor of Santa Ana; 2020–2022	Succeeded by Valerie Amezcua
