= 2020 Orange County Board of Supervisors election =

Orange County Board of Supervisors elections, 2020
- March 3 and November 3, 2020

2 of 5 seats to the Orange County Board of Supervisors
| | Majority party | Minority party |
|---|---|---|
| Party | Republican | Democratic |
| Last election | 4 | 1 |
| Seats before | 4 | 1 |
| Seats won | 2 | 0 |
| Seats after | 4 | 1 |
| Seat change | Steady | Steady |
- Republican: 50–60% Winners: Republican hold No election

The 2020 Orange County Board of Supervisors elections were held on March 3, 2020 and November 3, 2020. Two of the five seats of the Orange County, California Board of Supervisors were up for election.

County elections in California are officially nonpartisan. A two-round system was used for the election, starting with the first round in March; followed by a runoff in November between the top-two candidates in each district. Runoffs are held if no candidate receives a majority in each district.

== District 1 ==
2020 Orange County Board of Supervisors District 1 election
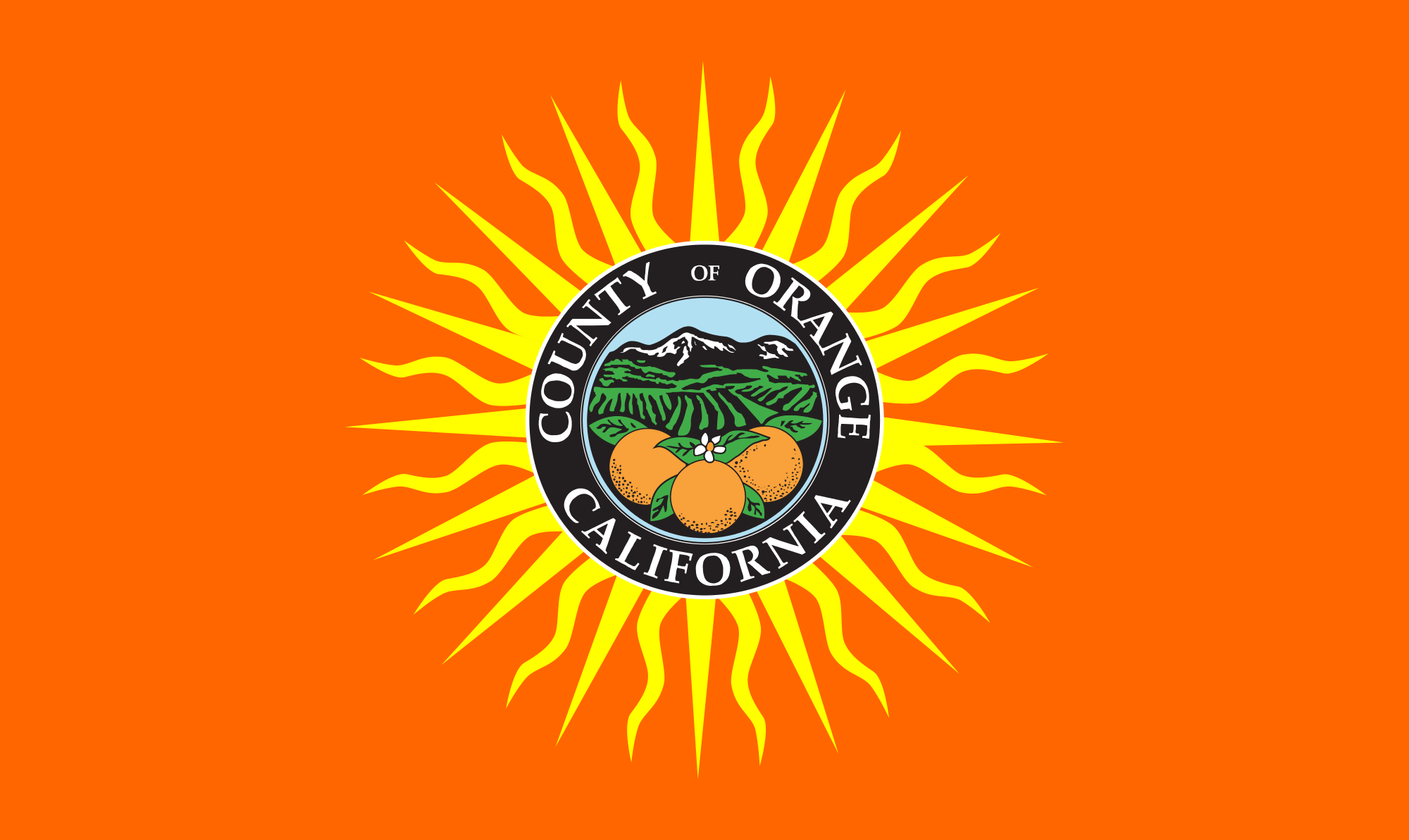
- March 3, 2020 (first round); November 3, 2020 (runoff)
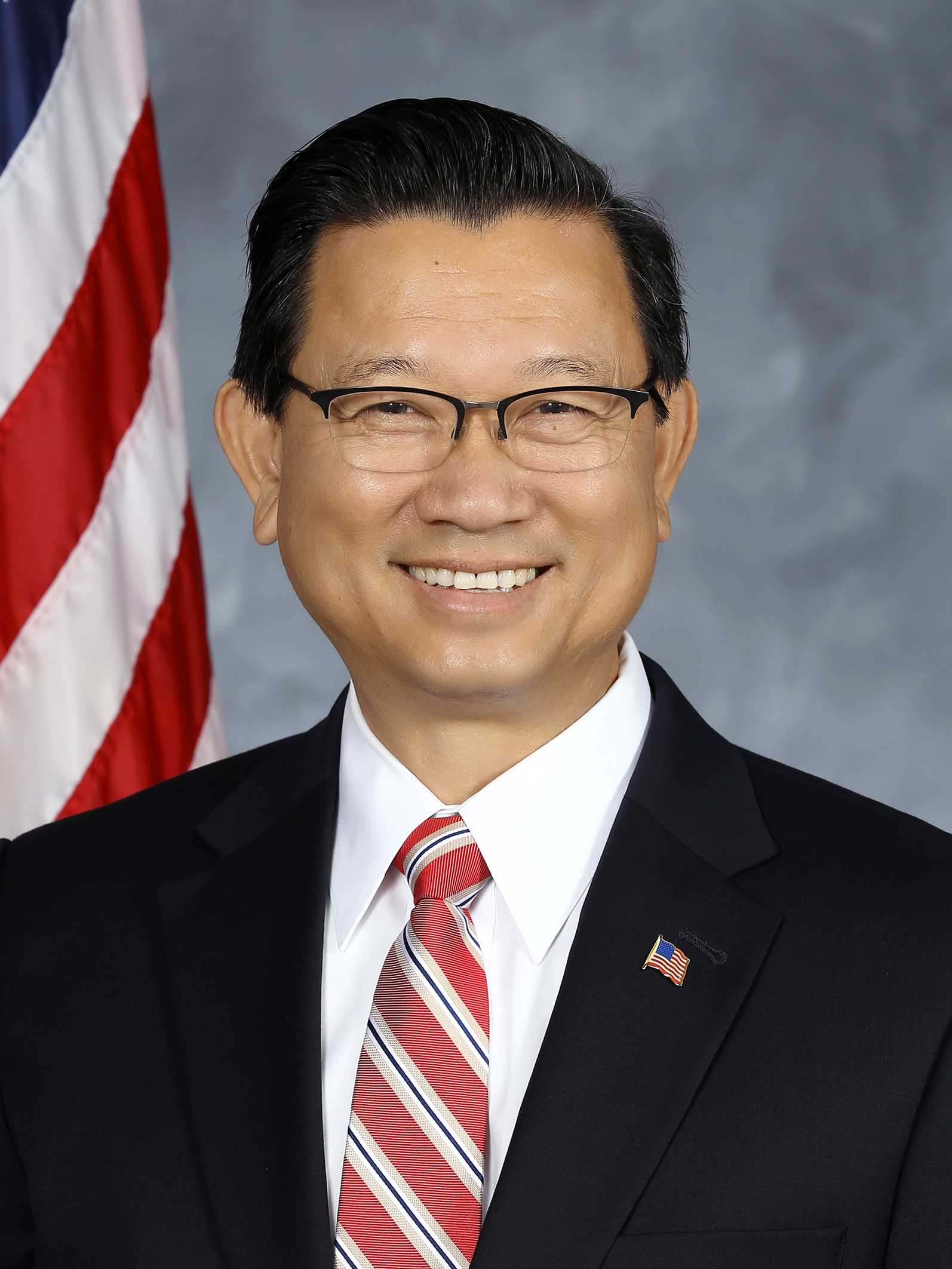

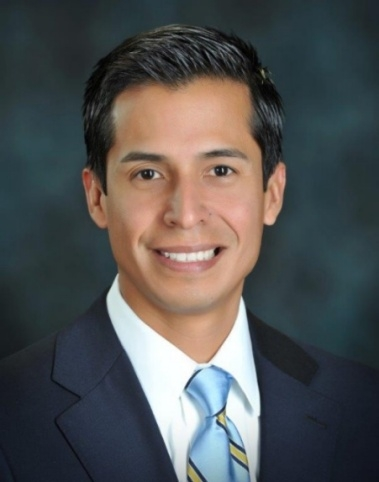

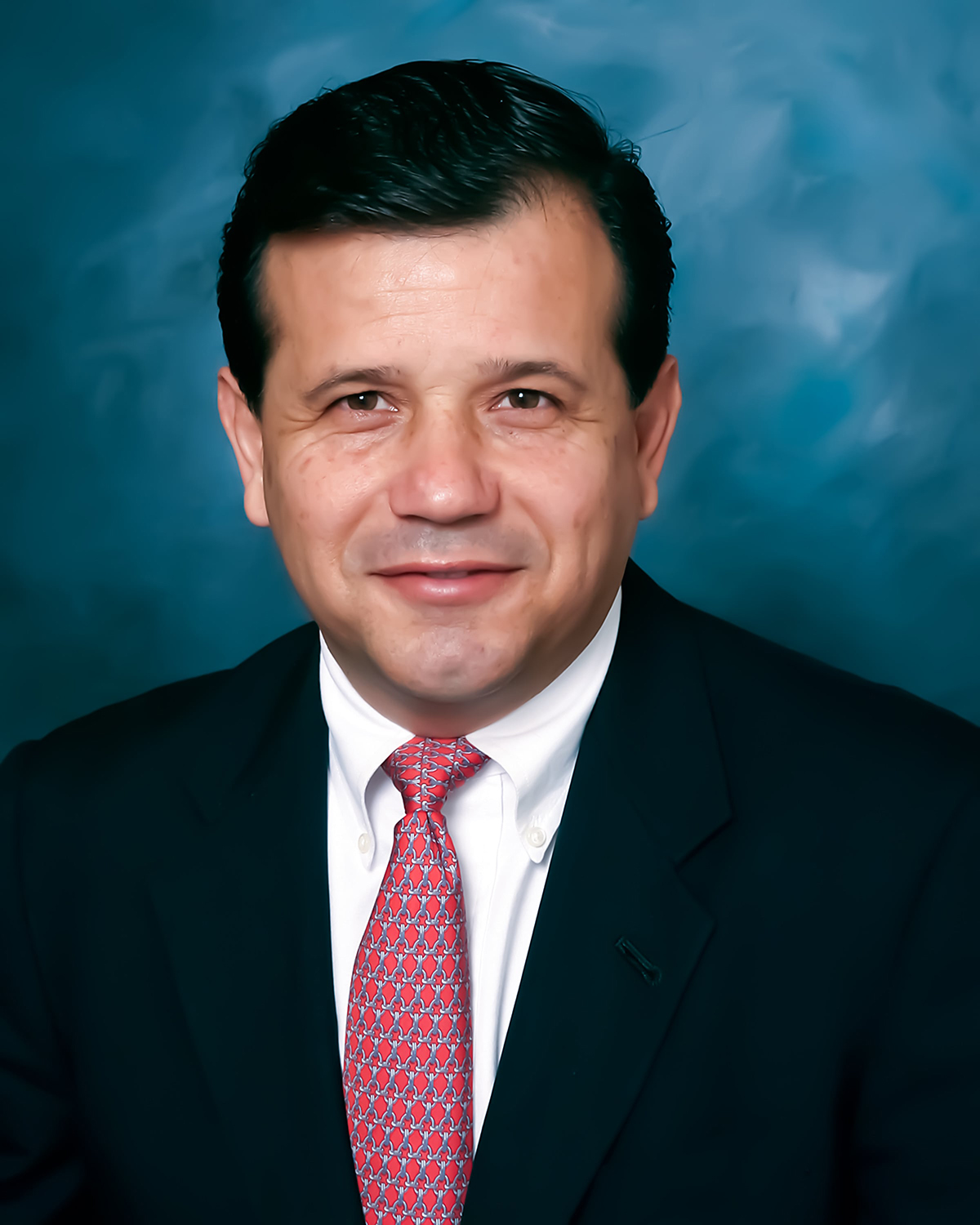

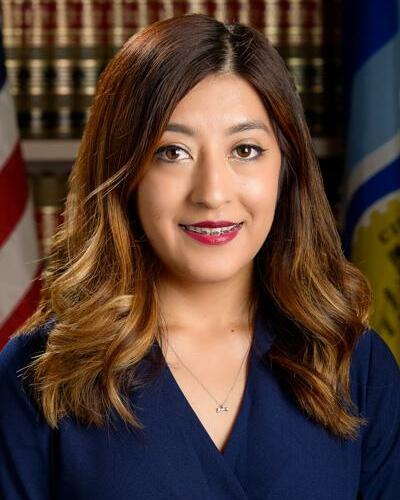
| Candidate | Andrew Do | Sergio Contreras |
| First round | 40,999; 42.3% | 21,721; 22.4% |
| Runoff | 106,252; 51.8% | 98,693; 48.2% |
| Candidate | Miguel A. Pulido | Kim Bernice Nguyen |
| First round | 19,616; 20.2% | 14,570; 15.0% |
| Runoff | Eliminated | Eliminated |
Supervisor before election
Andrew Do
Elected Supervisor
Andrew Do

District 1 takes in western Orange County, including Santa Ana, Westminster, Garden Grove and parts of Fountain Valley. The incumbent is Andrew Do, who was re-elected with 50.2% of the vote in 2016.

=== Candidates ===
- Sergio Contreras, Westminster city councilman (Democratic)
- Andrew Do, incumbent supervisor (Republican)
- Kim Bernice Nguyen, Garden Grove city councilwoman (Democratic)
- Miguel A. Pulido, mayor of Santa Ana (Democratic)

=== General election ===
==== Endorsements ====
Sergio Contreras

Organizations

- Democratic Party of Orange County
- Orange County Labor Federation
Andrew Do

Organizations

- Republican Party of Orange County
Kim Bernice Nguyen

State-level officials

- Tom Umberg, state senator (D-34)
Miguel Pulido

Organizations

- Orange County Attorneys Association

==== Results ====
2020 Orange County's 1st supervisorial district general election initial round results by congressional district Map legend: Do—50–60%; Do—40–50%; Pulido—30–40%; No votes

Orange County Board of Supervisors 1st district, 2020
| Candidate | Votes | % |
|---|---|---|
| Andrew Do (incumbent) | 40,999 | 42.3 |
| Sergio Contreras | 21,721 | 22.4 |
| Miguel A. Pulido | 19,616 | 20.2 |
| Kim Bernice Nguyen | 14,570 | 15.0 |
| Total votes | 96,906 | 100.0 |

=== Runoff ===
==== Endorsements ====
Sergio Contreras

Organizations

- Democratic Party of Orange County
- Orange County Labor Federation
Andrew Do

Organizations

- Republican Party of Orange County

==== Results ====
Orange County Board of Supervisors 1st district runoff, 2020
| Candidate | Votes | % |
|---|---|---|
| Andrew Do (incumbent) | 106,252 | 51.8 |
| Sergio Contreras | 98,693 | 48.2 |
| Total votes | 204,945 | 100.0 |

== District 3 ==
2020 Orange County Board of Supervisors District 3 election
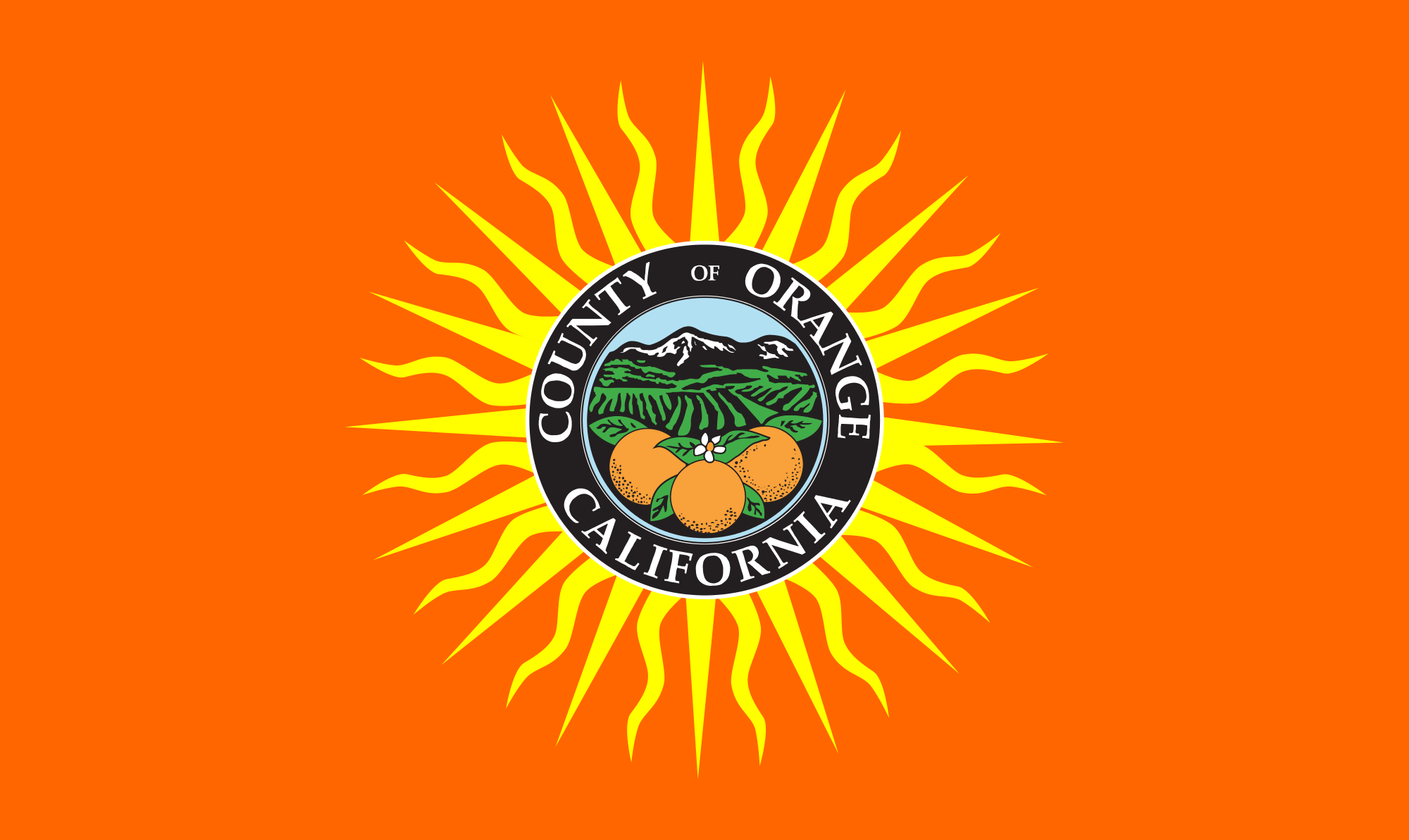
- March 3, 2020
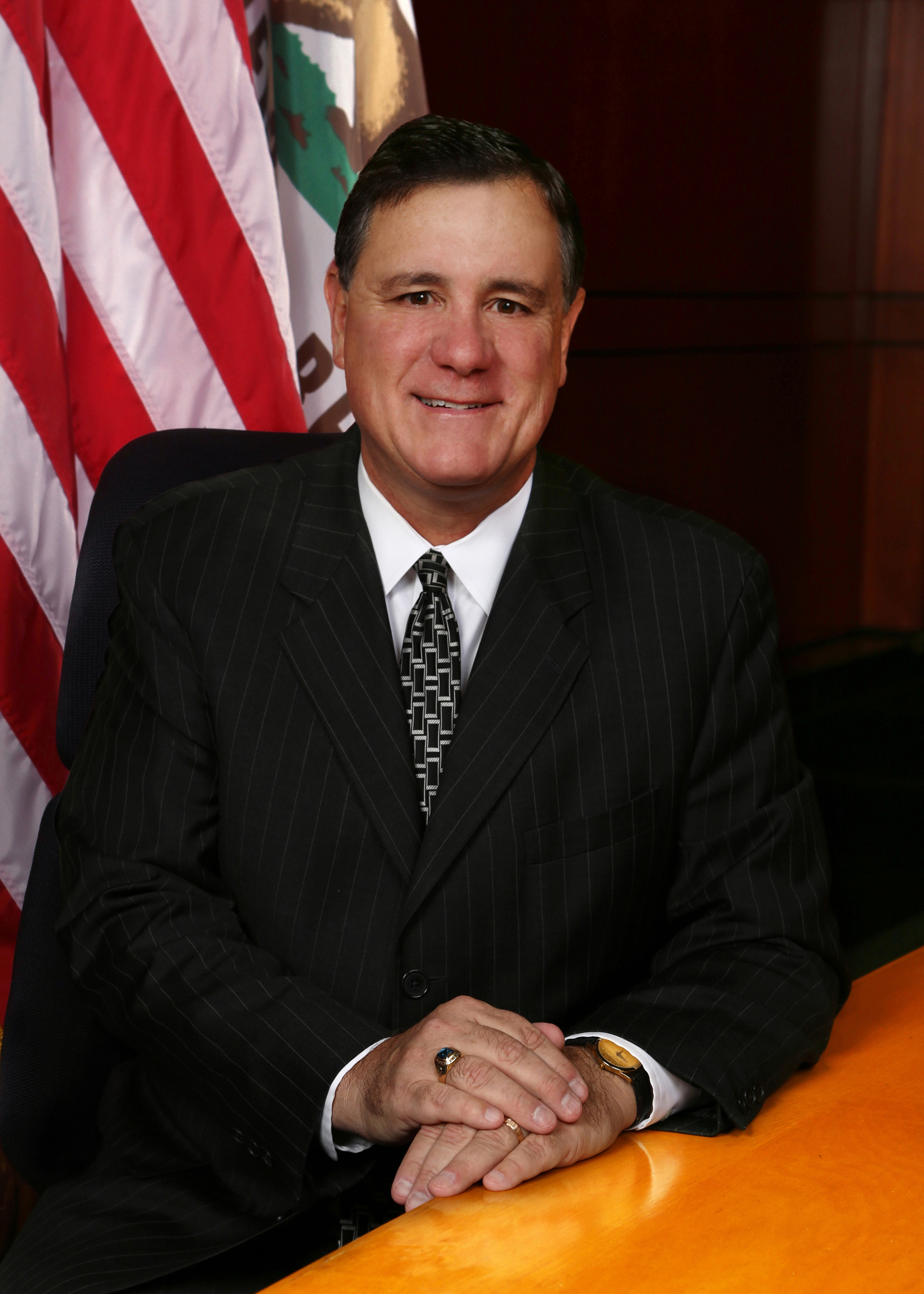

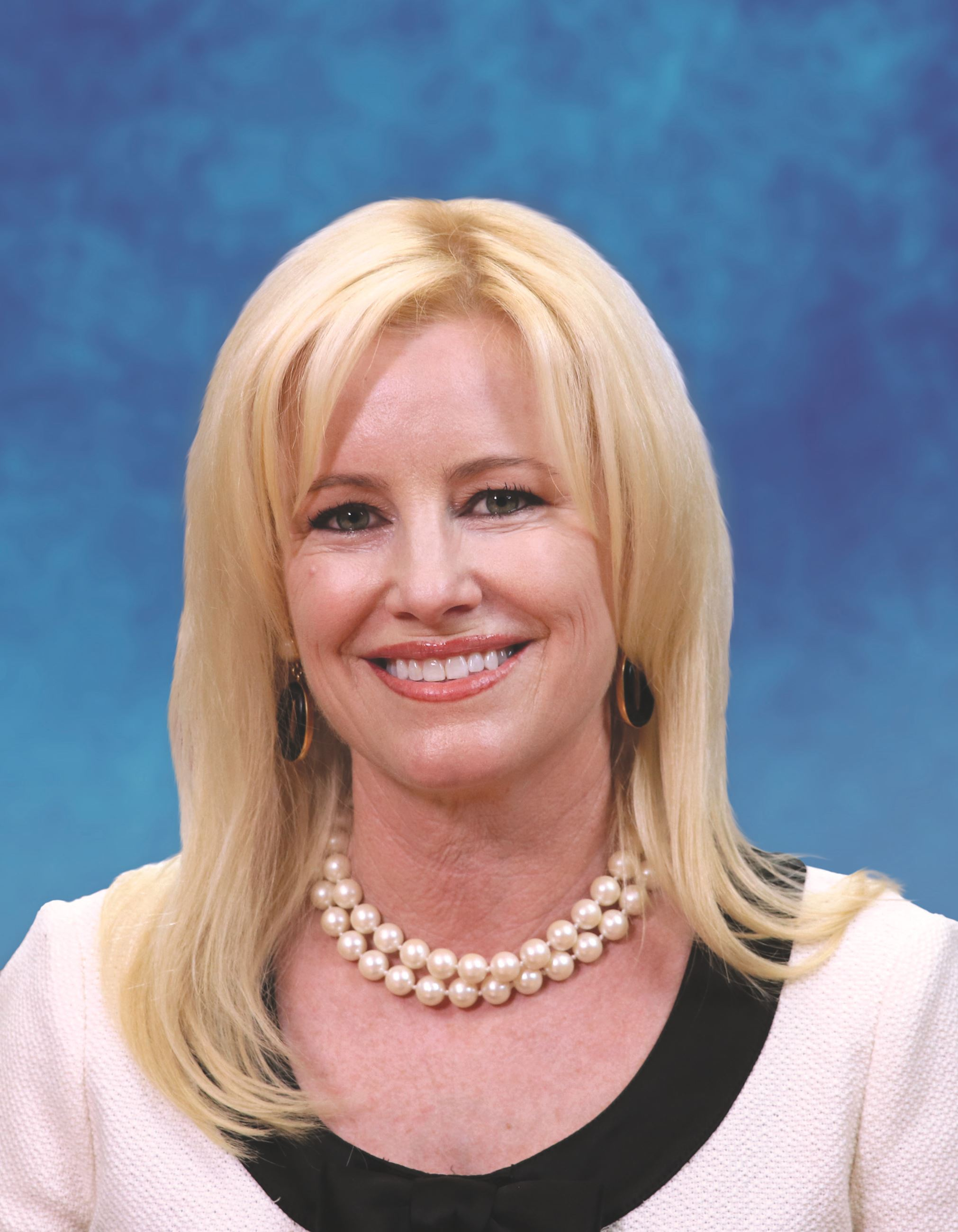
| Candidate | Donald Wagner | Ashleigh Aitken |
| First round | 80,544; 52.3% | 73,334; 47.7% |
Supervisor before election
Donald Wagner
Elected Supervisor
Donald Wagner

The 3rd district encompasses central Orange County, taking in Irvine, Orange, Tustin, Villa Park, Yorba Linda, and Anaheim Hills. The incumbent is Donald P. Wagner, who was elected with 42.0% of the vote in 2019.

Incumbent Republican Donald Wagner ran for re-election.

=== Candidates ===
- Donald Wagner (Republican), incumbent supervisor
- Ashleigh Aitken, attorney and member of the Orange County Fair Board (Democratic)

=== General election ===
==== Results ====
2020 Orange County's 3rd supervisorial district general election results by congressional district Map legend: Wagner—60–70%; Wagner—50–60%; Aitken—50–60%

Orange County Board of Supervisors 3rd district, 2020
| Candidate | Votes | % |
|---|---|---|
| Donald P. Wagner (incumbent) | 80,544 | 52.3 |
| Ashleigh Aitken | 73,334 | 47.7 |
| Total votes | 153,878 | 100.0 |
