= Daisy Wende =

Bolivian fashion designer (1929–2025)

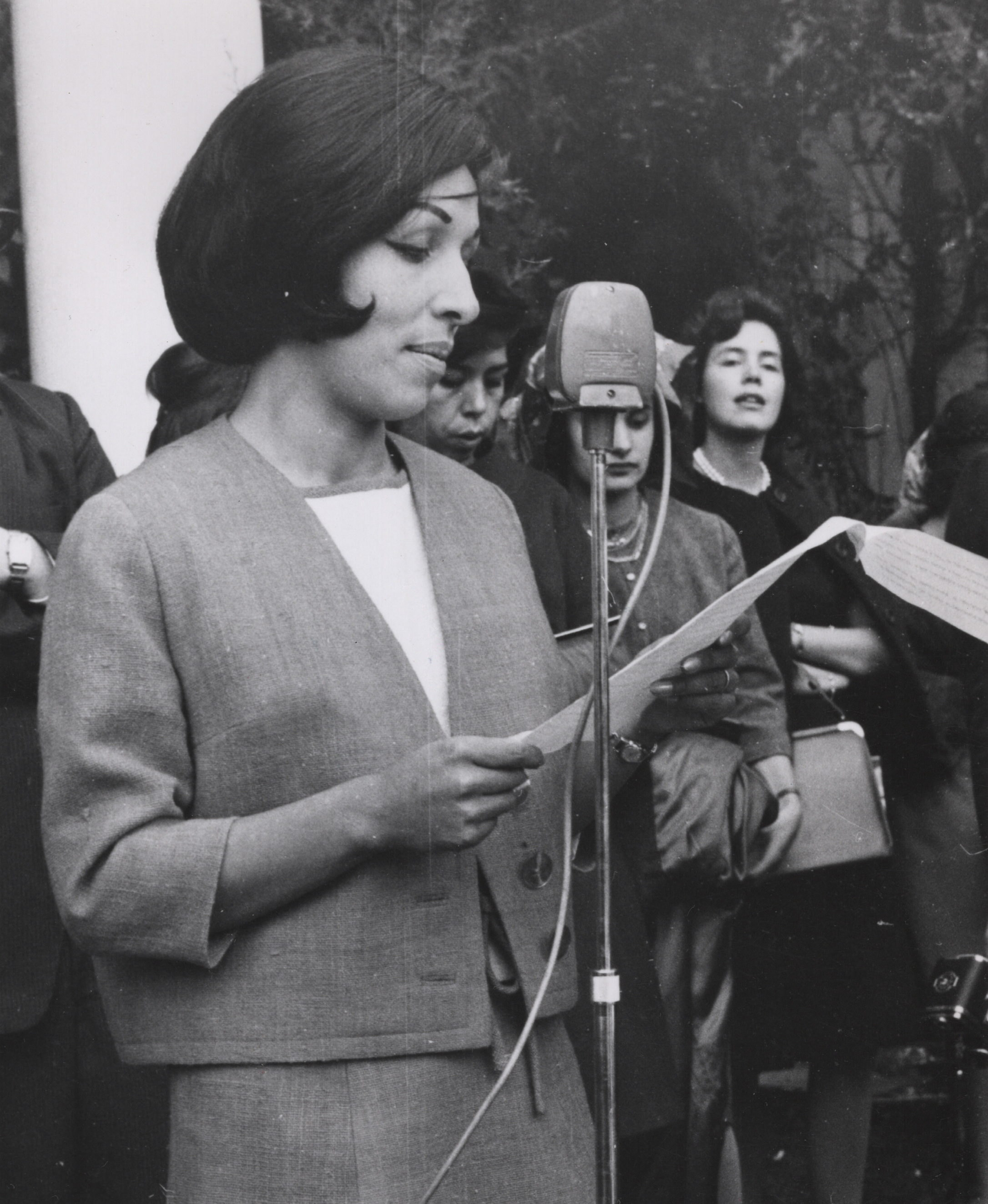
- Wende in 1963
- Born: Daisy Urquiola Sarmiento; 3 August 1929; Quime, Bolivia
- Died: 10 June 2025 (aged 95); La Paz, Bolivia
- Education: Western Michigan University
- Occupation: Fashion designer
- Spouse: Ernesto Wende (d. 2013)
- Honours: Order of the Condor of the Andes (2005)

Daisy Urquiola Wende (née Sarmiento, 3 August 1929 – 10 June 2025) was a Bolivian fashion designer. She was one of the first national designers to see the potential of Alpaca wool for high fashion and export. She created the women's triangular poncho in the 1960s, a time when the poncho was related to masculinity.

== Early life and education ==
Wende was born on 3 August 1929 in Quime, Bolivia. She studied at the American Institute in La Paz, graduating in 1947. She made her graduation dress herself. Wende then studied Home Economics at Western Michigan University (WMU) in Kalamazoo, Michigan, United States, graduating in 1950.

== Career ==
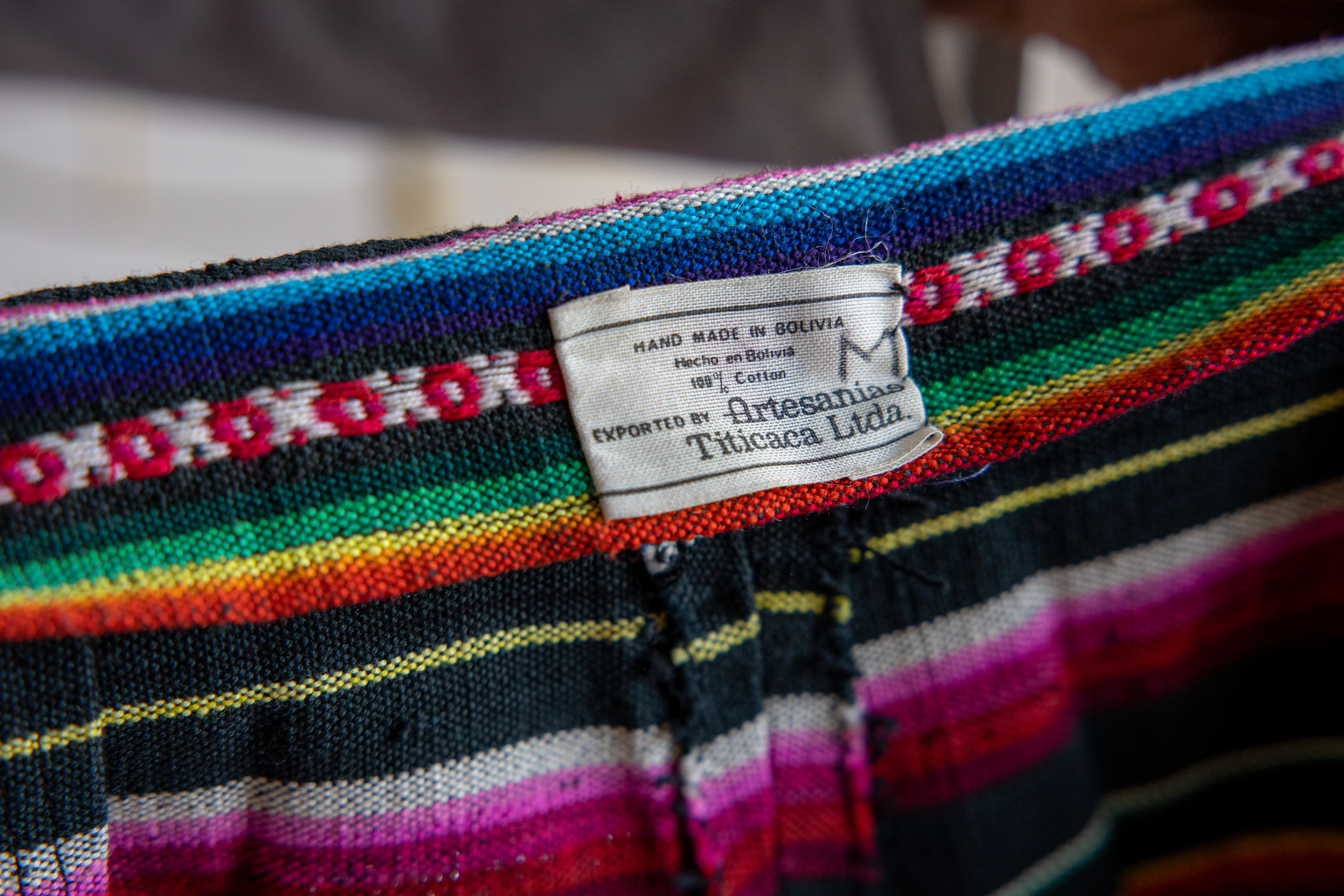
Label from Wende's brand Artesanías Titicaca

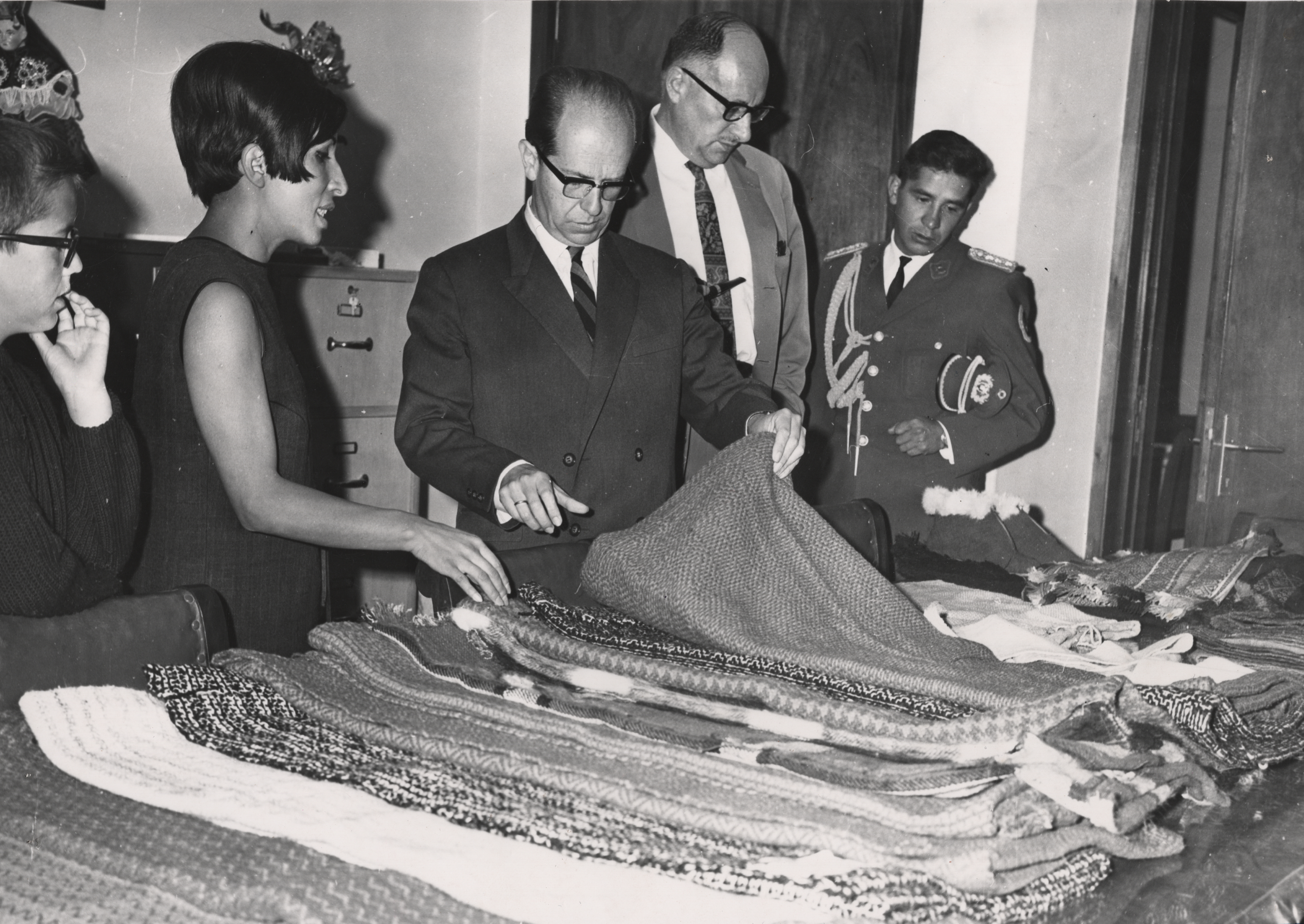
Wende observing fabrics with President Luis Adolfo Siles

Wende was one of the pioneers of cultural fashion in Bolivia as one of the first national designers to see the potential of Alpaca wool for high fashion and to incorporate traditional arts into her designs. She was inspired by the clothing of milk sellers, morenada, diablada, tinku and waca waca dancers and Bolivian folklore.

In 1962, Wende founded her brand Artesanías Titicaca, which promoted the export of traditional Bolivian fabrics and alpaca, llama and vicuña wools. She said that: "our objective is to raise the Bolivian standard of living by making as many families as possible self-sufficient. Some 3,500 families produce goods for us in their homes that we export to the United States." By the mid-1960s, Wende was President of the Bolivian Chamber of Trade.

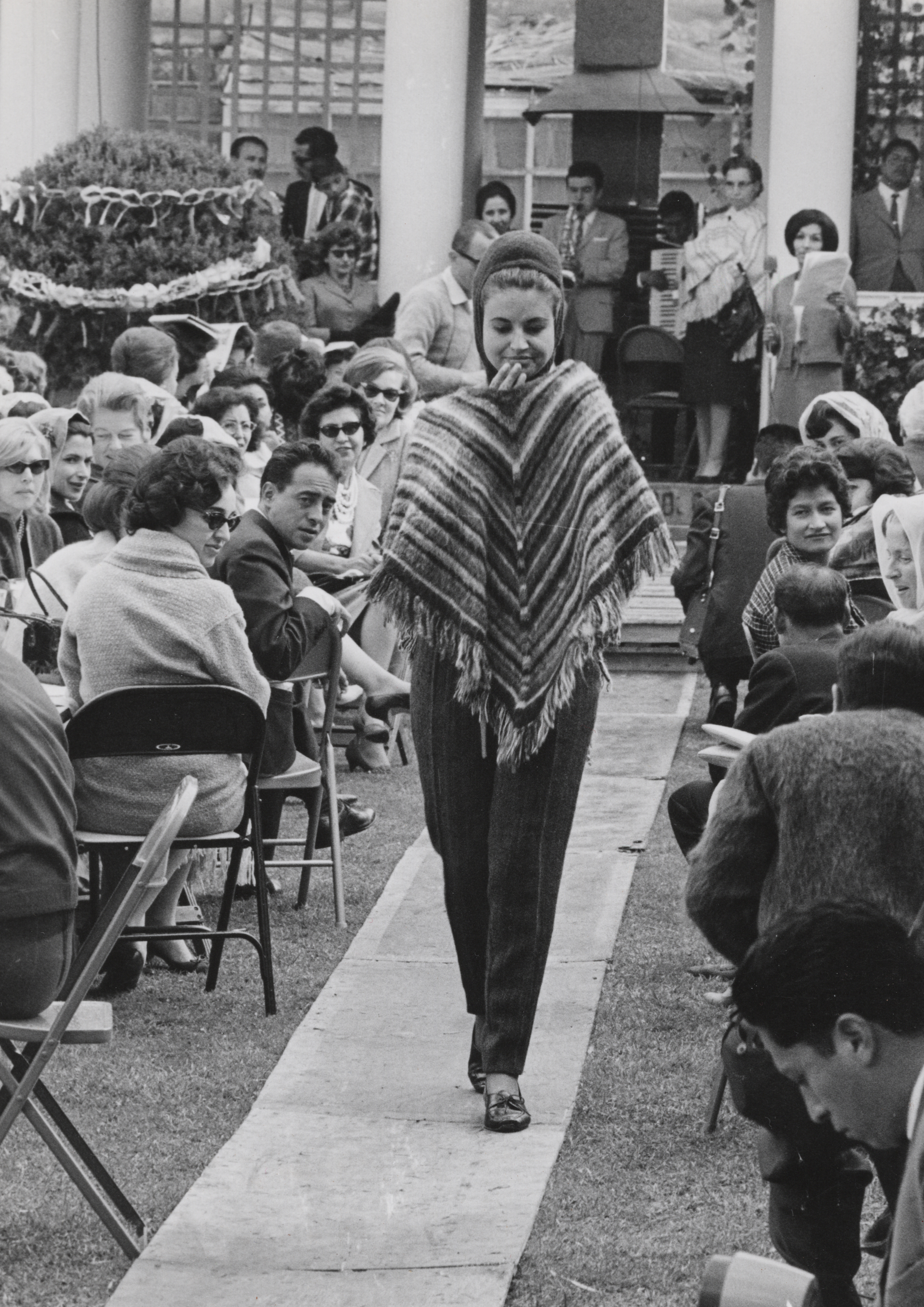
Model in a triangular poncho created by Wende, 1963

In the 1963, Wende created the hand-woven women's triangular poncho at a time when the poncho was related to masculinity.

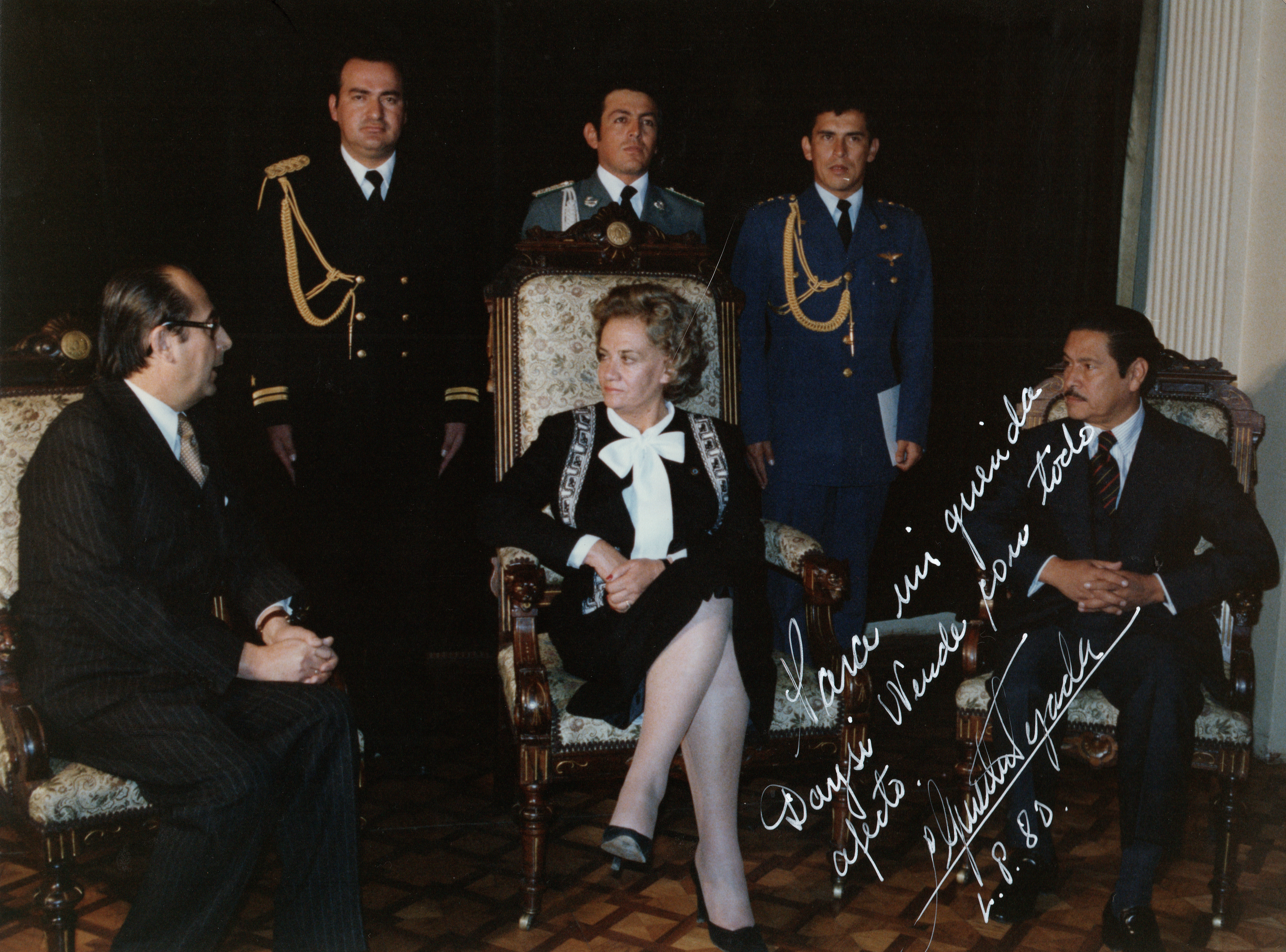
President Lidia Gueiler in a dress designed by Wende, 1979

When Lidia Gueiler took office as the first President of Bolivia in 1979, she wore one of Wende's creations, a hand-embroidered dress inspired by the stepped design of the Tihuanaco archaeological site. Wende was a member of the Federation of Business and Professional Women, and attended a conference in Washington D. C., United States, in 1983, where she gave a garment from her brand to the American First Lady Nancy Reagan.

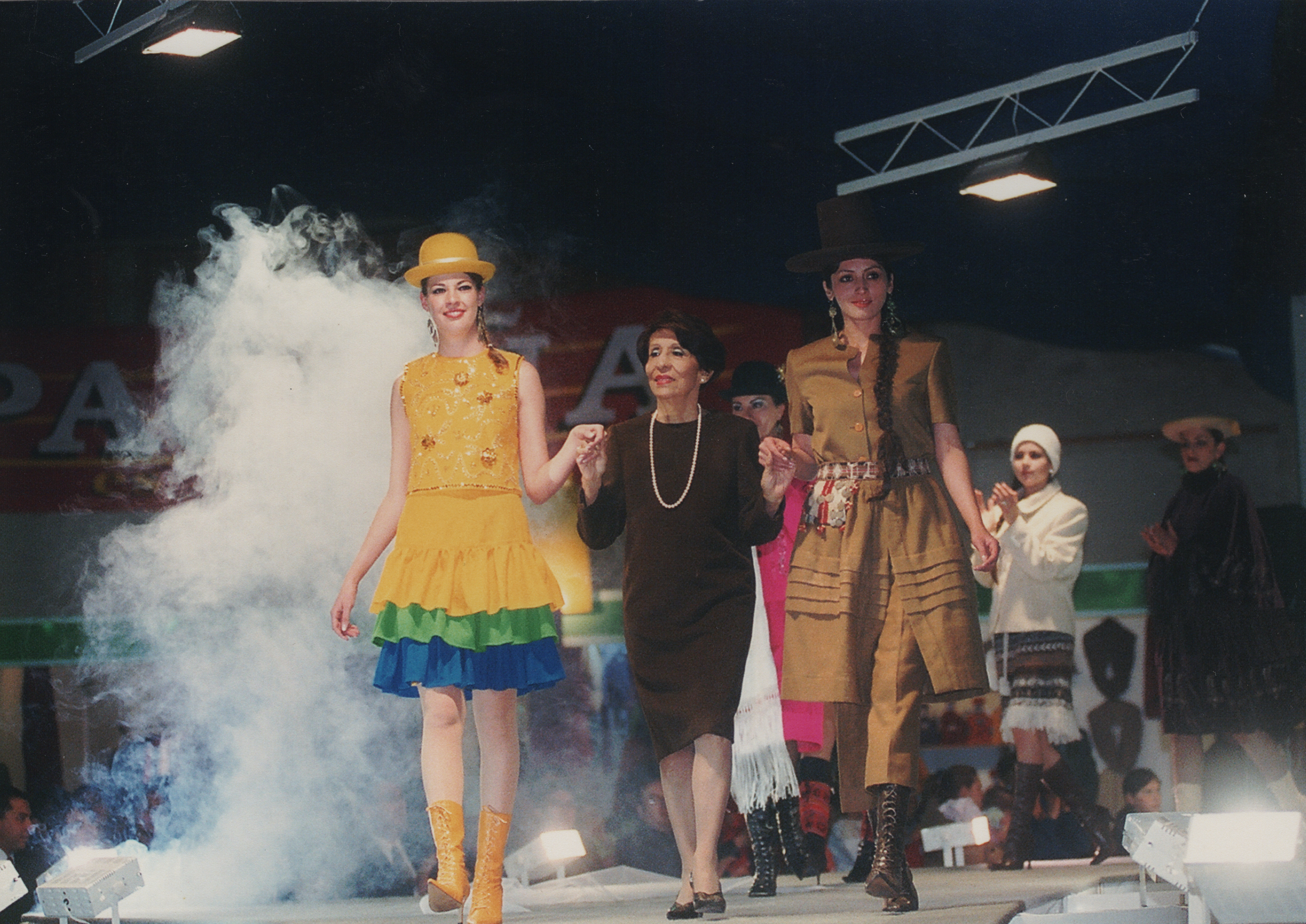
Wende during a catwalk show in La Paz, 2005

In 2005, Wende was appointed to the Order of the Condor of the Andes (OCA), the highest state decoration of Bolivia. The same year she named one of her collections "Cholita Nueva" (New Cholita) in honour of the Bolivian cholas, whose garments and hats she reinterpreted. The collection used traditional Andean aguayo cloth and lace.

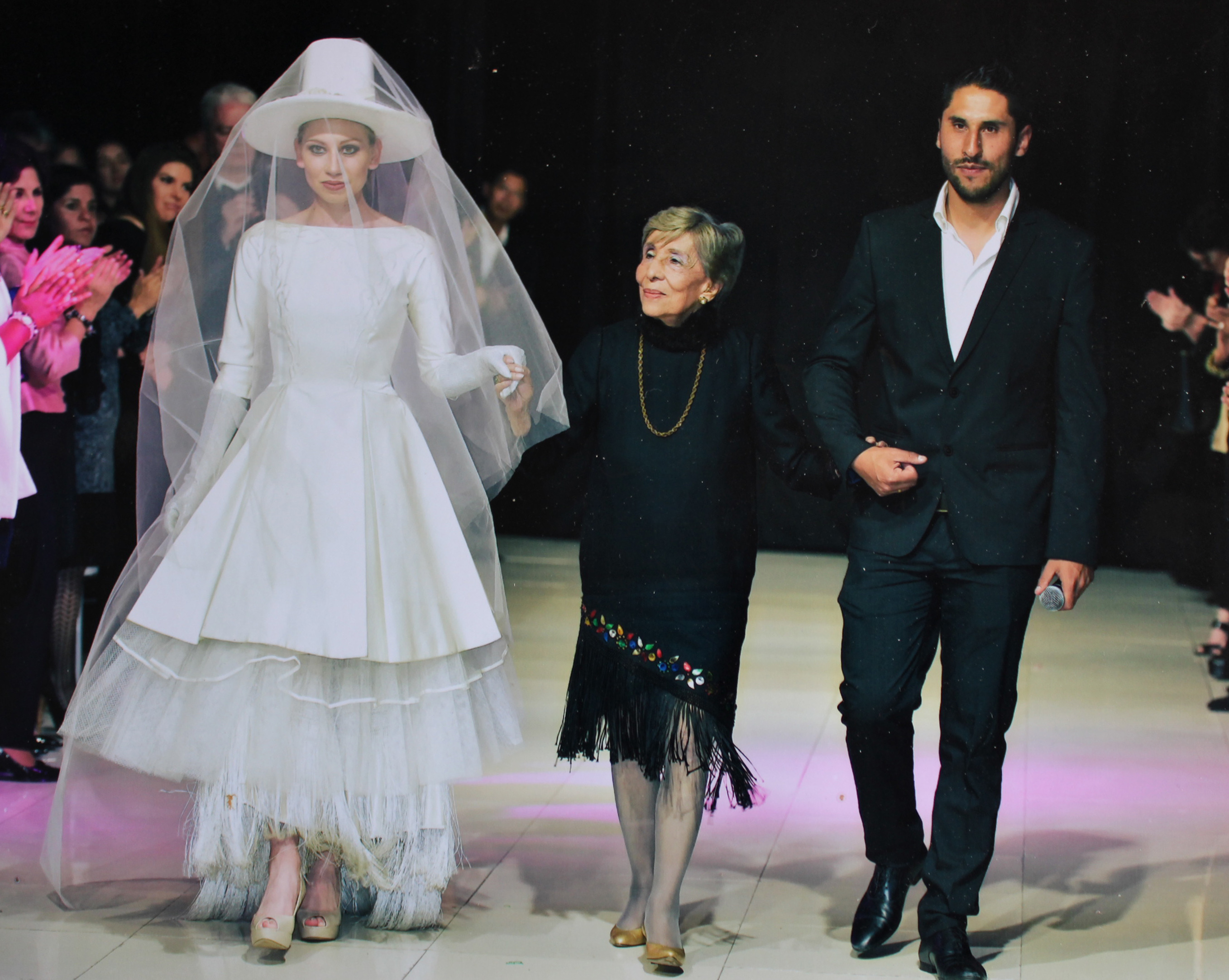
Wende during a catwalk show in La Paz, 2019

A book of Wende's design work, El universo de Daisy Wende (2017) was published by the Bolivian Catholic University San Pablo.

In 2024, Wende showed designs at the Laboratorio Boliviano de Diseño de Autor y Moda Diseñarte Bolivia.

== Personal life ==
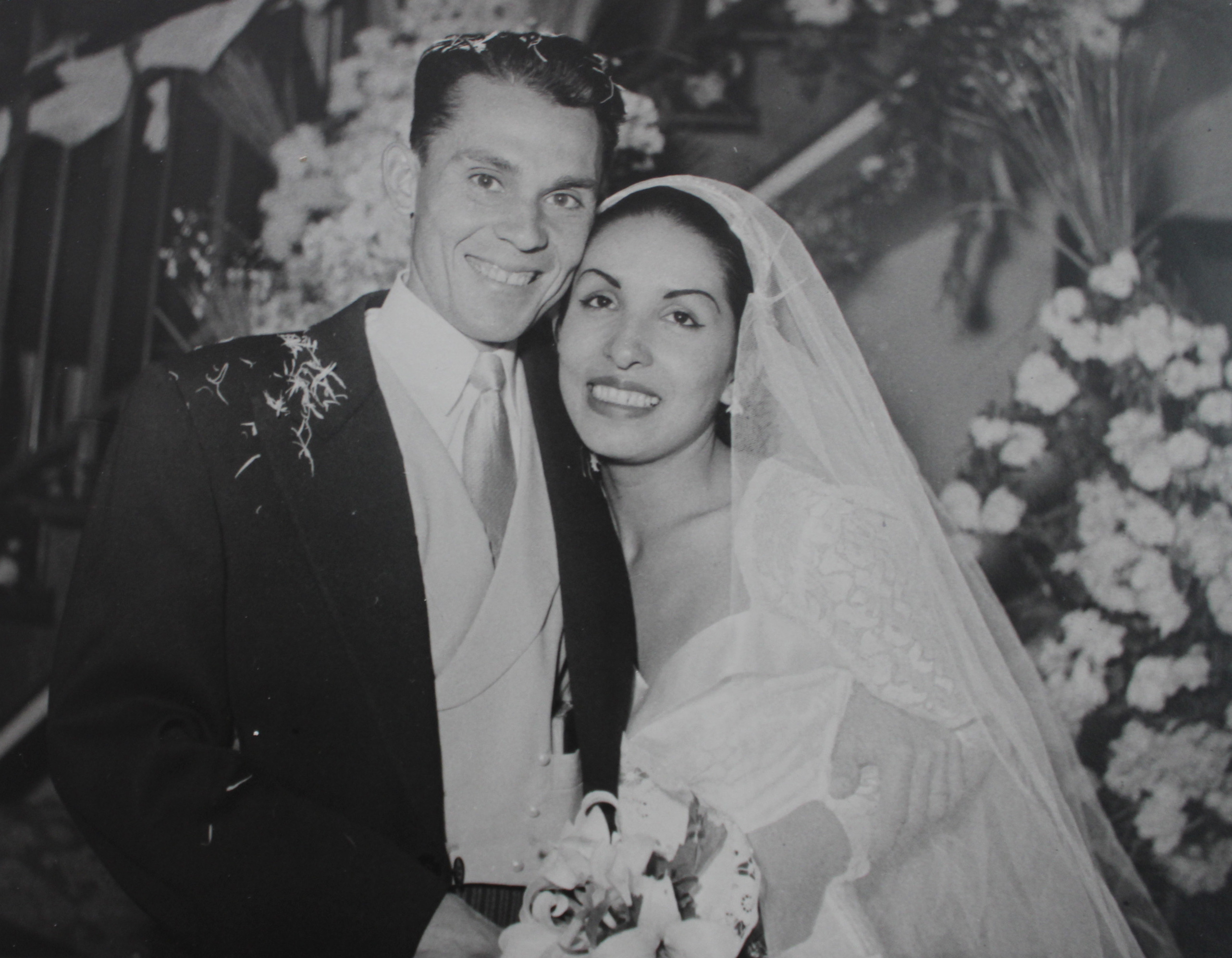
Wende at her wedding to Ernesto Wende

Wende was married to Ernesto Wende, who died in 2013. She died on 10 June 2025 in La Paz, Bolivia, aged 95.
