= Steve Rocco (politician) =

American politician and television personality

Steve Rocco is an American politician, who served as a board member of the Orange Unified School District from December 6, 2004 to December 6, 2008 in Orange, California, a perennial candidate for public offices, and a former public-access television cable TV personality. Rocco gained international attention by winning an upset victory to his board seat in 2004 with absolutely no campaigning and for being considered an eccentric.

Rocco previously ran for mayor of Santa Ana but finished third out of three candidates.

In 2004, Rocco was elected to Orange Unified School District despite making no public appearances or comments about his candidacy. Although some were not sure if he would even show up to the board meetings, he did so, and with a theatricality whereby he made speeches about conspiracy theories involving charter schools, his father's death, and a group of politicians and other leaders he calls The Partnership, which he claimed was trying to control the United States and kill Rocco for speaking out against them. Soon, an attempt to recall Rocco was established but failed to garner enough signatures to be put on the ballot. The board did vote to censure Rocco, to which Rocco responded by suing the board, but he lost the case in court.

In 2008, Rocco filed to run against incumbent Carlos Bustamante for Santa Ana City Council. Rocco won 18% of the vote, coming in third out of four candidates. In September of that year, he was arrested for stealing a bottle of ketchup from the cafeteria of Chapman University.

In 2014, Rocco ran for Orange County Clerk-Recorder. He ran for Clerk-Recorder again in 2022. In 2024, Rocco again ran for a seat on the school board of the Orange Unified School District.

== Life before politics ==
Not much is known about Rocco's personal life. According to his voter registration he was born in Italy and was 53 years old in 2004. He does not have any children. Neighbors claim that he would often show up to Santa Ana swap meets, or even hold his own garage sales, to sell records that were stamped as property of the public library, and would yell "No bargains!", "Don't touch!", and "I'm watching you!" as people tried to purchase the records. It is known that on July 20, 1980, Rocco was convicted of shoplifting several rolls of film and a sausage from a local grocery store. In response to that, Rocco distributed a series of pamphlets titled Hey Man, where he interviews himself to discuss a conspiracy theory involving Eastman Kodak, Albertsons Inc., and SmokeCraft Sausage. According to a neighbor, Rocco lived in his parents' house at Santa Ana, California, for at least 20 years. Several years before 2004, Rocco's parents became bedridden due to sickness. He was also known for leaving his home at nine every morning on his bicycle.

One of the most notable sources of information about Rocco came from his 1992 autobiography, titled ROCCO Behind the Orange Curtain, published by Mountain Sun Productions, where he talks about the "secret chronicles and public-record accounts of corruption, murder and scandal of corporate and political California, written by America's premier legal technician." In the book Rocco claimed that he had purchased the film and sausage on a previous visit to the store, and happened to have the film and sausage, but no receipt, with him when he went back to the store. In the book, Rocco discussed his conspiracy theory involving Eastman Kodak, Albertsons Inc., and SmokeCraft Sausage, and claimed that the son of an Albertsons executive is the "largest drug dealer in the West", and that the company participates in murder. Steve Rocco goes on to blame Albertsons for hiring a man to steal his bicycle and being behind a 1980 arrest for stealing records from a local library, which Rocco says was dismissed by a judge because of an illegal search. According to Rocco's conspiracy theory, powerful companies and politicians are also responsible for his loss of work as a substitute teacher and telephone operator.

== 2000 Santa Ana mayoral campaign ==
Rocco first entered politics by running for mayor of Santa Ana, California in 2000. Although Rocco declined to share personal information or discuss his campaign, he showed up at a candidate forum wearing camouflage and sunglasses. Rocco won 12% of the vote, finishing third out of three candidates.

== Orange Unified School District's Board of Education ==
In 2004, Rocco ran for the Board of Education of the Orange Unified School District, a California school district that has a budget of $230 million and serves over 32,000 students at 42 schools. After filing his candidacy, Rocco ignored mail from district officials and the teachers' union. The local Parent-Teacher Association sent him an invitation to a candidate forum, but the letter was mailed back, unopened. On the ballot, Rocco identified himself as a writer and educator. Rocco was up against local park ranger Phil Martinez, who had three children in the district, and was an active volunteer with the Boy Scouts of America. Surprisingly, on November 4, 2004, the mysterious Rocco won 54% of the vote, beating Martinez. News of Rocco's victory ran in the New York Post, Ottawa Citizen, and USA Today. Paul Pruss, a middle school teacher and president of the local teachers' union, said in an interview with USA Today that "nobody has seen this guy", and called the election bizarre.

Many thought that Rocco wouldn't show up for his December 6 trustee swearing-in ceremony. Soon after the election, a man identifying himself as Rocco called KPCC-FM, a public radio station based in Pasadena, California, and promised that he'd be present at the ceremony. Rocco did arrive, and became well known for always dressing in black, wearing sunglasses and knit caps, and never willingly allowing himself to be photographed. Parents claimed Rocco wasted time during meetings with long speeches on irrelevant topics like credit unions, his parents' medical issues, and a conspiracy that a group of powerful figures called "The Partnership" were taking over the United States and had tried to kill him for speaking out against them. In his autobiography, Rocco revealed that he weighs 140 pounds, and was a camp counselor in Northern California in 1979.

=== Recall attempt ===
On June 28, 2007, "The Committee to Recall Steve Rocco" filed a notice to circulate a petition to recall Rocco. The petition notice stated that "Mr. Rocco refuses to participate in closed session meetings, refuses to vote on most issues". Rocco filed a response with the Registrar of Voters Office, where he alleged that the attempt to remove him was due to cronyism and nepotism. To get a recall vote on the ballot, the committee needed to collect signatures of 11,097 voters, which was 10% of all registered voters in the Orange Unified School District. The committee, led by area parent Teri Rasmussen, originally planned to garner enough signatures by December 5 to put the item on Orange County's June 2008 ballot. The committee then decided to try to get the required signatures by September 21 to put the recall vote on the February 2008 ballot. On the September 21 deadline, only about 5,000 had been gathered, and the timetable was pushed back. The committee didn't have the required signatures by December 5, so the attempt to remove Rocco was abandoned.

After the failed recall effort, Fred Smoller, an associate professor of political science, began to produce a documentary, titled Rocco The Vote, about Rocco's election and the attempt to remove him from the board. Other producers included Jay Boylan, Brenda Brkusic, Ed Miskevich, and Janet English. On October 31, 2008, KOCE-TV Public Television premiered the 24-minute Rocco The Vote. Smoller also posted video clips of Steve Rocco speaking on YouTube. In an interview, Smoller said that "The YouTube website has 41,000 hits, but, unfortunately, that is from a large group of people who are convinced that Rocco is Andy Kaufman. Others think Rocco is cool because he is giving it [to] the 'man!', but I think there is a big difference between his incoherent rants and effective challenges to authority."

=== Board censures Rocco ===
On October 12, 2006, a vote was held on a resolution to censure Rocco, and was passed by vote of 5 to 2. Rocco responded by calling the resolution "censorship", and claimed that he had "tried to bring up the issues people are not willing to bring up". Rocco, with assistance from Richard McKee, president of the California First Amendment Coalition, sued the Orange Unified School District, but lost the case and was ordered to pay $37,000 in legal fees.

Rocco was redistricted out of his Trustee Area into another board member's Trustee Area, and did not move to the new district. Thus, he failed to run for reelection.

== Santa Ana City Council run ==
On July 14, 2008, Rocco pulled filing documents to run for Santa Ana city council against incumbent Carlos Bustamante. On the candidate worksheet he turned in, Rocco claimed that his occupation was to "Prevent the further incursion of Partnership/Organized Crime into the OUSD, as represented by Mexican Mafia... their Caucasian Puppetmasters... Judicial Miscreants... Register... Law Enforcement". Rocco also listed several local Latino politicians as members of the "Mexican Mafia", and other white politicians and business leaders as their "Caucasian Puppetmasters".

After the final election results were tallied, incumbent Carlos Bustamante had won less than 50% of the vote, but that was enough to beat blogger Art Pedroza who had 19%, and Rocco with 18%.

== Ketchup theft and arrest ==
On September 29, 2008, Rocco was arrested, detained, and charged with stealing a bottle of Heinz ketchup from the cafeteria of Chapman University at 10:30 a.m. According to Sgt. Dan Adams of the Orange Police Department, "One of the security guards saw [Rocco] take a 14-ounce bottle of ketchup off of one of the tables. [Rocco] concealed it and started to ride away on a bike". Police said that Rocco was "cooperative", but faces a possible $250 fine for the theft and up to 45 days in jail.

Fred Smoller said in an interview, that Rocco may have been looking for him. Smoller said that Rocco "started coming to the school asking about [Smoller]. [Rocco's] presence was of concern to some people who had seen [Rocco]."

On April 16, 2009, a jury convicted Steve Rocco of stealing a half-full bottle of ketchup from a Chapman University cafeteria. Rocco refused to comment on his way out of the courtroom except to say, "This is not over". A spokeswoman for the Orange County District Attorney's Office said they will recommend probation. Rocco could have avoided a conviction altogether if he had simply made an agreement with authorities to keep away from the university. Instead he insisted on a jury trial. At an informal press conference held at Hart Park in Orange, Rocco accused Professor Smoller and Chapman University President Jim Doti of conspiring to have him killed. Rocco said that an unknown man named "Vanover" was hired by Smoller/Doti to do him in.
