= Jose Solorio =

American politician from California

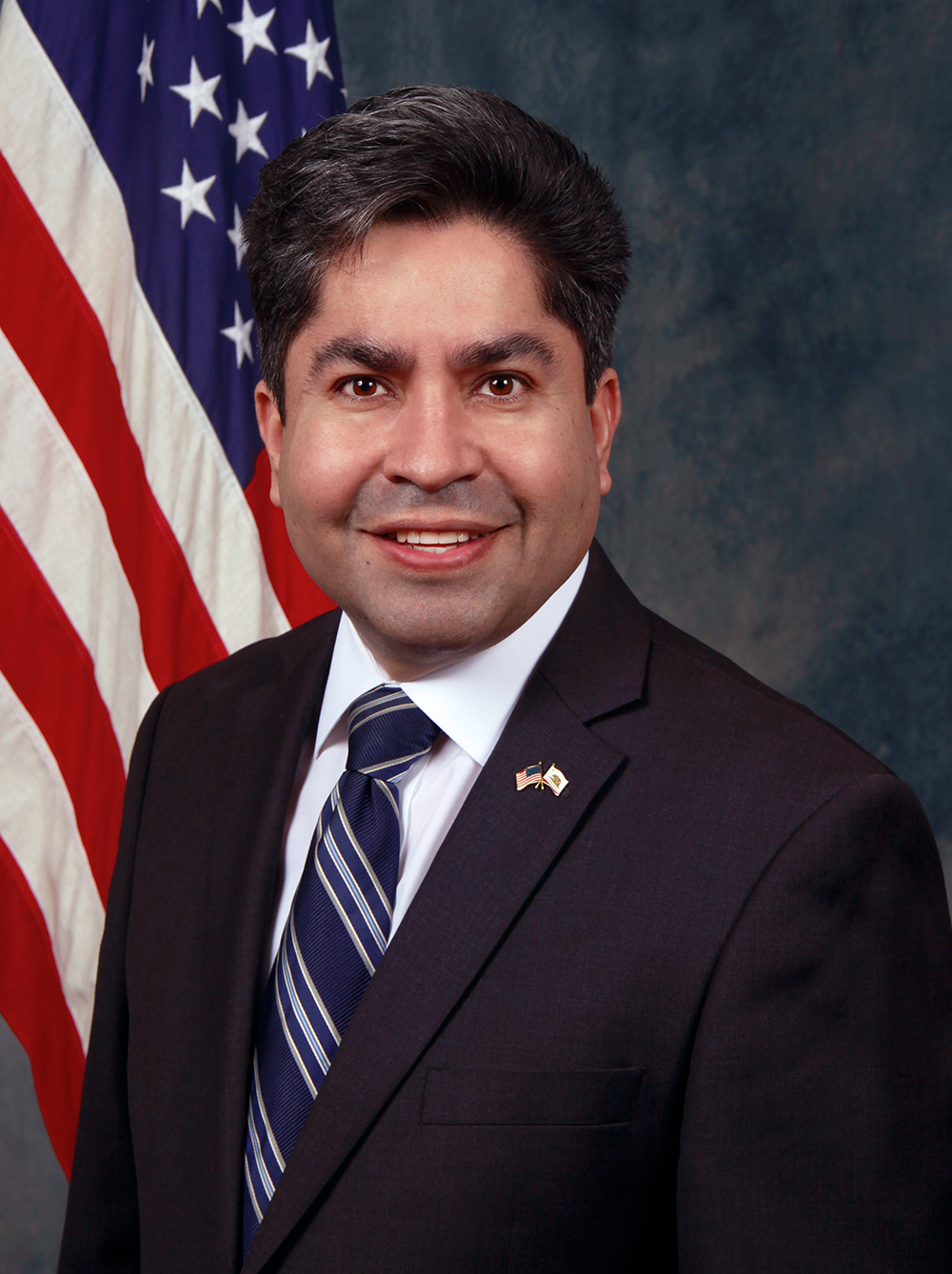

Member of the Santa Ana City Council
- In office 2016–2020
- Preceded by: Angelica Amezcua
- Succeeded by: Valerie Amezcua
- Constituency: Ward 3
- In office December 4, 2000 – December 4, 2006
- Preceded by: Ted Moreno
- Succeeded by: Vicente Sarmiento
- Constituency: Ward 1

Member of the California State Assembly from the 69th district
- In office December 4, 2006 – December 3, 2012
- Preceded by: Tom Umberg
- Succeeded by: Tom Daly

Personal details
- Born: September 28, 1970 (age 56) Ticuitaco, Mexico
- Party: Democratic
- Children: 2
- Education: University of California, Irvine, Harvard University

Jose J. Solorio (born September 28, 1970) is an American politician from California. He was elected to the California State Assembly in 2006 as a Democrat. He represented the 69th Assembly District, which includes the city of Santa Ana and parts of Anaheim and Garden Grove. From 2016 to 2020, he was the State Senate's appointee to the California Student Aid Commission, which administers the Cal Grant and other state scholarship programs.

He was re-elected to the Santa Ana City Council in 2016 and finished his term in 2020.

He currently serves as director of external affairs and business development with California American Water and as a California water commissioner.

== Early civic career ==
Before being elected to the State Assembly, he was a Santa Ana city council member from 2000 to 2006, when he became an assembly member. He was appointed to the Orange County Water District Board of Directors and serves on the Board of Directors for the Boys and Girls Club of Santa Ana and the advisory board for UC Irvine's Department of Planning, Policy, and Design.

== Background and education ==
As the son of migrant farm workers, Solorio earned a Bachelor of Arts degree in social ecology at University of California, Irvine, and a Master of Arts degree in public policy from Harvard University. He lives in Santa Ana. He has two sons, Michael and Diego. Solorio is a vegetarian.

== See also ==
- List of University of California, Irvine people
