= Miguel A. Pulido =

American politician and businessman

Miguel Pulido
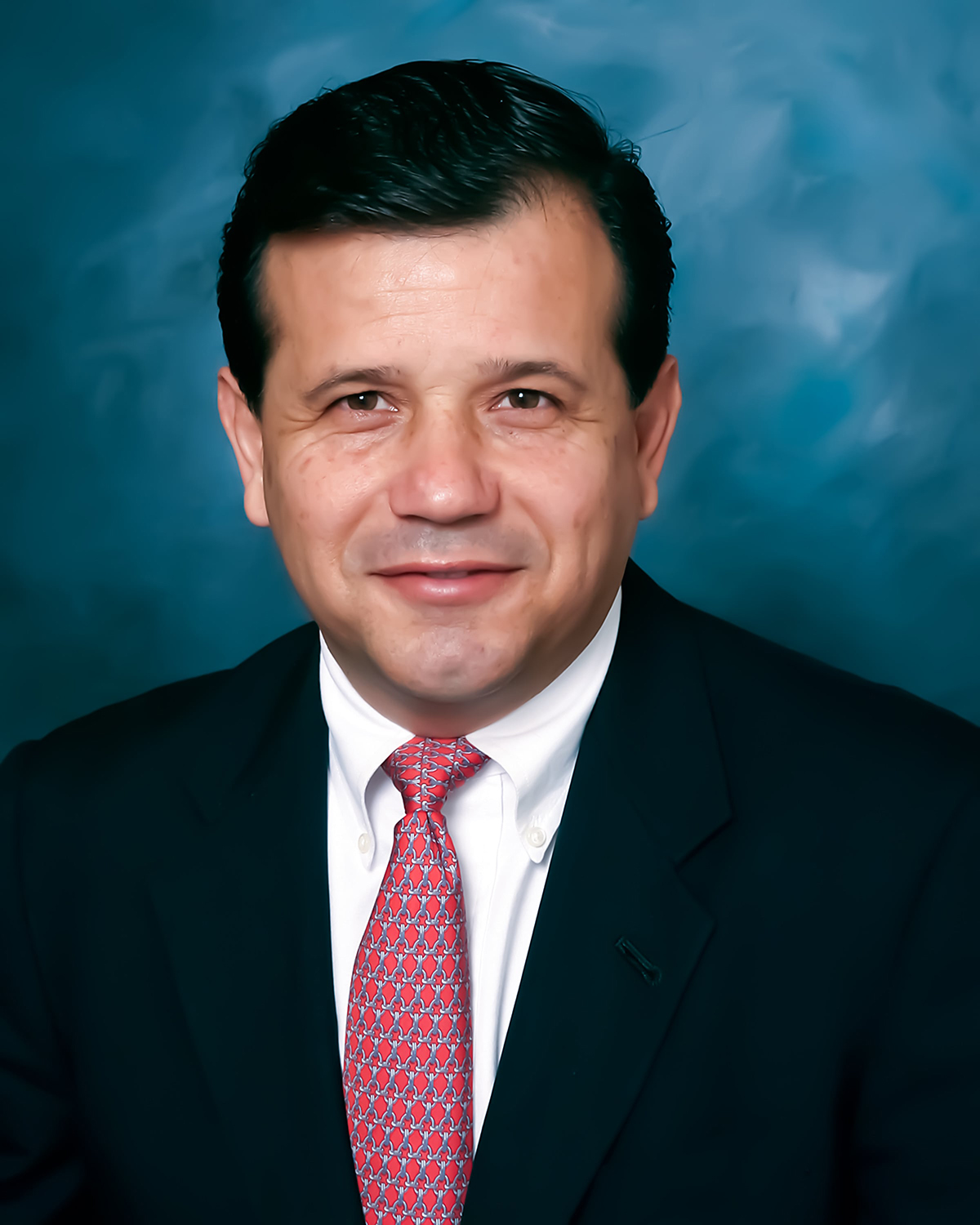

Mayor of Santa Ana
- In office November 8, 1994 – December 8, 2020
- Preceded by: Daniel Young
- Succeeded by: Vicente Sarmiento

Personal details
- Born: 1956 (age 69–70) Mexico City, Mexico
- Party: Democratic
- Education: California State University, Fullerton (BS)

Miguel A. Pulido (born 1956) is an American politician and businessman who served as mayor of Santa Ana, California from 1994 to 2020.

== Early life and education ==
Pulido was born in Mexico City. He and his parents immigrated to the United States in 1961, settling in Fullerton, California. Pulido attended Troy High School and earned a Bachelor of Science degree in mechanical engineering from California State University, Fullerton.

== Career ==
Pulido was first elected to the City Council on November 4, 1986. He was the first Latino mayor of Santa Ana, serving in the position from November 8, 1994 to December 8, 2020. He is a member of the Democratic Party. In total, he would be elected to serve thirteen consecutive two-year terms as mayor.

Pulido has been a supporter of the OC Streetcar project.

Pulido opposed efforts in both 2006 and 2012 to institute mayoral term limits in Santa Ana. On November 6, 2013, Santa Ana voters overwhelmingly approved "Measure GG", which limited mayors to serve a total of eight years. Measure GG grandfathered terms which preceded its 2013 passage, thus allowing Pulido the possibility of serving an additional four two-year terms. Puldio would go on to be elected to three more terms after the passage of the bill. Since he had served for seven years after the 2013 term-limit measure went into effect, he is ineligible to serve another 2-year term, as that would cause him to exceed the eight-year tenure limit.

In 2016, Pulido was fined for failing to report campaign expenses.

In 2017, Santa Ana Residents Against Corruption Launches a Recall Against Mayor Miguel Pulido

Pulido ran as a candidate in the 2020 Orange County Board of Supervisors election, placing third in a field of four candidates.

Pulido's term as mayor ended on December 8, 2020.

== Personal life ==
Pulido and his wife, Laura, have three children. Pulido's wife works as a freelance writer.

== Electoral history ==
=== City Council ===
1986 Santa Ana Ward 3 City Council election
Candidate	Votes	%
Miguel A. Pulido	13,819	52.13
P. Lee Johnson	12,689	47.87
Total votes	26,508	100

1990 Santa Ana Ward 3 City Council election
Candidate	Votes	%
Miguel A. Pulido (incumbent)	16,433	53.59
Coween Dickerson	14,232	46.41
Total votes	30,665	100

=== Mayor ===
1994 Santa Ana mayoral election
Candidate	Votes	%
Miguel A. Pulido	10,288	41.80
Ann Avery Andres	8,830	35.87
Sal Mendo	5,496	22.33
Total votes	24,614	100
Turnout	{{{votes}}}	35.05%

1996 Santa Ana mayoral election
Candidate	Votes	%
Miguel A. Pulido (incumbent)	26,688	65.80
Leah Dupont	13,871	34.20
Total votes	40,559	100
Turnout	{{{votes}}}	54.23%

1998 Santa Ana mayoral election
Candidate	Votes	%
Miguel A. Pulido (incumbent)	24,032	70.18
Ted Moreno	10,214	29.83
Total votes	34,246	100
Turnout	{{{votes}}}	50.73%

2000 Santa Ana mayoral election
Candidate	Votes	%
Miguel A. Pulido (incumbent)	34,102	71.25
Vital D'Caprio	8,025	16.77
Steve Rocco	5,733	11.98
Total votes	47,860	100
Turnout	{{{votes}}}	57.33%

2002 Santa Ana mayoral election
Candidate	Votes	%
Miguel A. Pulido (incumbent)	25,669	100
Total votes	25,669	100
Turnout	{{{votes}}}	31.31%

2004 Santa Ana mayoral election
Candidate	Votes	%
Miguel A. Pulido (incumbent)	38,634	80.55
Stanley Fiala	9,327	19.45
Total votes	47,961	100
Turnout	{{{votes}}}	53.02%

2006 Santa Ana mayoral election
Candidate	Votes	%
Miguel A. Pulido (incumbent)	23,170	68.77
Thomas A. Gordon	8,262	24.52
Stanley Fiala	2,259	6.71
Total votes	33,691	100
Turnout	{{{votes}}}	36.14%

2008 Santa Ana mayoral election
Candidate	Votes	%
Miguel A. Pulido (incumbent)	30,352	54.96
Michele Martinez	16,199	29.33
George M. Collins	7,610	13.78
Stanley Fiala	1,069	1.94
Total votes	55,230	100
Turnout	{{{votes}}}	53.47%

2010 Santa Ana mayoral election
Candidate	Votes	%
Miguel A. Pulido (incumbent)	21,588	49.46
Alfredo Amezcua	11,689	26.78
Charles Hart	4,216	9.66
George M. Collins	3,820	8.75
Roy Alvaredo	2,339	5.36
Total votes	43,652	100
Turnout	{{{votes}}}	40.32%

2012 Santa Ana mayoral election
Candidate	Votes	%
Miguel A. Pulido (incumbent)	27,092	48.18
P. David Benavides	14,995	26.67
George M. Collins	6,289	11.18
Lupe Moreno	3,147	5.60
Roy Alvaredo	3,082	5.48
Miguel Angel Briseno	1,626	2.89
Total votes	56,231	100
Turnout	{{{votes}}}	49.20%

2014 Santa Ana mayoral election
Candidate	Votes	%
Miguel A. Pulido (incumbent)	16,608	50.07
Roman Reyna	11,477	34.60
Mark I. Lopez	5,000	15.07
Laura Perez	85	0.26
Total votes	33,170	100
Turnout	{{{votes}}}	35.01%

2016 Santa Ana mayoral election
Candidate	Votes	%
Miguel A. Pulido (incumbent)	34,317	50.72
Benjamin Vazquez	24,576	36.32
Steve Rocco	8,774	12.97
Total votes	67,667	100
Turnout	{{{votes}}}	66.0%

2018 Santa Ana mayoral election
Candidate	Votes	%
Miguel A. Pulido (incumbent)	28,360	50.61
Sal Tinajero	27,674	49.39
Total votes	56,034	100
Turnout	{{{votes}}}	53.04%

=== County Supervisor ===
2020 1st district Orange County Supervisor primary
Candidate	Votes	%
Andrew Do (incumbent)	40,999	42.31
Sergio Contreras	21,721	22.41
Miguel A. Pulido	19,616	20.24
Kim Bernice Nguyen	14,570	15.04
Total votes	96,906	100

== See also ==
- List of longest-serving United States mayors
