= Quime =

- Town
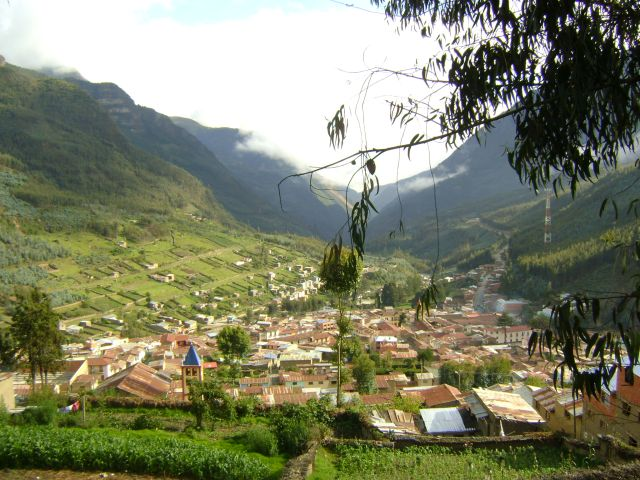

- Coat of arms
- Nickname: Un lugar de descanso
- Motto: luchar hasta el final
- Location within Bolivia
- Coordinates: 16°59′S 67°13′W
- Country: Bolivia
- Department: La Paz Department
- Province: Inquisivi Province
- Municipality: Quime Municipality

Government
  - Type: Democratic

Population (2001)
  - Total: 2,439
- Time zone: UTC-4 (BOT)

Quime is a small town in the La Paz Department in Bolivia situated southeast of the city of La Paz on the Khatu River. It is the seat of the Quime Municipality located in the Inquisivi Province.
