= Inquisivi Municipality =

- Municipality
- Location within Bolivia
- Coordinates: 16°50′S 67°0′W
- Country: Bolivia
- Department: La Paz Department
- Province: Inquisivi Province
- Seat: Inquisivi

Government
  - Mayor: Walter Calle

Area
  - Total: 1,262 sq mi (3,268 km^{2})
- Elevation: 9,200 ft (2,800 m)

Population (2001)
  - Total: 16,143
  - Density: 13/sq mi (5/km^{2})
  - Ethnicities: Aymara Quechua
- Time zone: UTC-4 (BOT)

Inquisivi Municipality is the first municipal section of the Inquisivi Province in the La Paz Department in Bolivia. Its seat is Inquisivi.

The municipality is situated on the eastern slopes of the Kimsa Cruz mountain range between the Altiplano in the west and the Amazon lowlands in the east.

It is bordered to the north by the Sud Yungas Province, to the east by the Cochabamba Department, to the south by the Colquiri Municipality and to the west by Cajuata, Licomapampa, Quime and Ichoca municipalities.

== Division ==
Inquisivi Municipality is divided into eight cantons:

- Arcopongo - 4,046 inhabitants (2001)
- Capiñata - 1,699 inhabitants
- Cavari - 2,024 inhabitants
- Eduardo Abaroa - 949 inhabitants
- Escola - 1,904 inhabitants
- Inquisivi - 3,495 inhabitants
- Pocusco - 960 inhabitants
- Siguas - 1,066 inhabitants

== Notable people ==
The politician and officer Eliodoro Camacho (1831–1899) was born in Inquisivi.
