= Tito Veizaga =

Bolivian politician (born 1961)

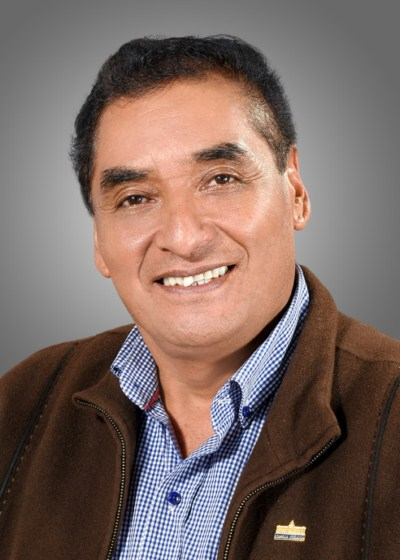
- Official portrait, 2017

Member of the Chamber of Deputies from La Paz circumscription 17
- In office 18 January 2015 – 3 November 2020
- Substitute: Juana Luque
- Preceded by: Quintín Quispe
- Succeeded by: Gladys Quispe
- Constituency: Inquisivi; Nor Yungas; Sud Yungas

Personal details
- Born: Tito Veizaga Cossío; 15 June 1961 (age 65) Cochabamba, Bolivia
- Party: Movement for Socialism
- Occupation: Politician; trade unionist

Tito Veizaga Cossío (born 15 June 1961) is a Bolivian cocalero activist, politician, and trade unionist who served as a member of the Chamber of Deputies from La Paz, representing circumscription 17 from 2015 to 2020. A member of the Movement for Socialism, Veizaga followed the usual path taken by rural union leaders, scaling the ranks of trade syndicate leadership until reaching the departmental level. In 2004, he was elected to serve as mayor of Cajuata, and though he failed in his attempt at reelection in 2010, he maintained a presence in his party's internal structure. In 2014, Veizaga was elected to represent the Yungas region in the Chamber of Deputies. Though many local cocaleros opposed the government's attempt at regulating their crop, Veizaga held the party line, supporting the passage of the 2017 General Law of Coca. He was not nominated for reelection.

== Early life and political career ==
An ethnic Quechua, Tito Veizaga was born on 15 June 1961 in Cochabamba. During his childhood, Veizaga and his family moved to Inquisivi, a province in La Paz's tropical coca-growing Yungas region. He spent a large part of his early life scaling local leadership positions in his community, in addition to those of the area's trade unions, holding posts at the municipal, provincial, and, ultimately, departmental levels.

Veizaga's entry into politics was facilitated through the Movement for Socialism (MAS-IPSP), a party historically affiliated with Cochabamba's Chapare coca growers but which, since 2001, had begun making inroads with Yungas-based growers' unions as well. The MAS's increased cooperation with these rural syndicates and trade associations provided it with a solid pool of political candidates for the 2004 municipal elections, with which it made notable incursions into local administration in regions such as the Yungas, where figures like Veizaga were elected as mayors and city councillors. Specifically, Veizaga was nominated to run in Cajuata, winning the mayoralty by a low but not insubstantial popular vote plurality. However, he failed in his attempt to seek reelection in 2010, being defeated by Freddy Laura of the Departmental Association of Coca Producers (ADEPCOCA). Veizaga's ousting at the hands of a rival coca growers' association represented a shift in disposition towards the MAS on the part of the Yungas-based cocaleros. If by 2005 the party had largely unified the Chapare and Yungas cocalero movements behind a single front, by the start of the 2010s, many Yungas cultivators had gown malcontent with the government's seeming favoritism towards Chapare growers.

== Chamber of Deputies ==
=== Election ===
Despite his defeat, Veizaga maintained the trust of MAS leadership and continued to operate within the party, serving as its departmental president for La Paz. In 2014, he was nominated for a seat in the Chamber of Deputies in representation of La Paz's circumscription 17, encompassing the three Yungas-based provinces. Although struggles over coca policy eroded electoral support for the MAS in the Yungas region, many local cocaleros had not yet suffered significant economic losses and, consequently, continued to support the government's continuation, delivering strong majorities for the MAS and its candidates in the 2014 election. As a result, Veizaga overwhelmingly won his race, nearly septupling the vote of his next closest competitor, though his margin is reduced to just fifty-six percent when considering the abundant number of blank and null ballots cast.

=== Tenure ===
Veizaga's parliamentary term coincided with the government's attempt to definitively implement a new General Law of Coca to replace the one enacted in 1988. For cocaleros of the traditional coca-growing Yungas region, the new law threatened their privileged status by extending the zone of legal production in the Chapare and expanding the government's regulatory oversight over their crop. In a bid to block the legislation, ADEPCOCA sought the support of the Yungas' two parliamentary representatives: Veizaga and Senator Ancelma Perlacios. However, both legislators refused to file a motion of unconstitutionality on the coca growers' behalf, leading ADEPCOCA to censure them and enlist five opposition deputies to represent them instead. Ultimately, the passage of the General Law of Coca—ratified six months later by MAS parliamentarians, including Veizaga, and upheld by the Plurinational Constitutional Court—broke the government's fragile relationship with ADEPCOCA and other Yungas cocaleros. For his part, the situation surrounding the General Law of Coca marked the highlight of Veizaga's tenure. He was not nominated for reelection, with the MAS maintaining the practice of almost entirely renewing its party lists for each successive electoral cycle.

==== Commission assignments ====
- Constitution, Legislation, and Electoral System Commission
  - Constitutional Development and Legislation Committee (2015–2016)
- Rural Native Indigenous Peoples and Nations, Cultures, and Interculturality Commission
  - Coca Leaf Committee (Secretary; 2016–2019)
- Planning, Economic Policy, and Finance Commission
  - Science and Technology Committee (2019–2020)

== Electoral history ==
Electoral history of Tito Veizaga
Year	Office	Party	Votes			Result	Ref.
Year	Office	Party	Total	%	P.	Result	Ref.
2004	Mayor (Note: Per Article 3 Section VI of the 1967 Constitution with amendments from 1995, individuals who appear at the top of a party's electoral list of councillors are also that party's candidate for mayor. This practice was discontinued following the passage of the 2009 Constitution, with municipal elections since 2010 holding separate contests for mayor and municipal councillors.)	Movement for Socialism	597	27.61%	1st (Note: Presented on an electoral list. The data shown represents the share of the vote the entire party/alliance received in that constituency.)	Won	
2010	Mayor	Movement for Socialism	907	28.89%	2nd	Lost	
2014	Deputy	Movement for Socialism	40,308	78.50%	1st	Won	
Source: Plurinational Electoral Organ | Electoral Atlas

Chamber of Deputies of Bolivia
Preceded by Quintín Quispe	Member of the Chamber of Deputies from La Paz circumscription 17; 2015–2020	Succeeded by Gladys Quispe
