= Qullqi Pata =

Mountain in Bolivia

- Location within Bolivia

Highest point
- Elevation: 4,503 m (14,774 ft)
- Coordinates: 17°25′43″S 67°02′21″W

Geography
- Location: Bolivia; La Paz Department
- Parent range: Andes

Qullqi Pata (Aymara qullqi silver, pata stone bench, step, "silver step", also spelled Kolke Pata) is a 4,503 m (14,774 ft) mountain in the Bolivian Andes. It is located in the La Paz Department, Inquisivi Province, Colquiri Municipality, southeast of Colquiri. Qullqi Pata lies south of Kimsa Llallawa. One of the nearest villages is Qillqata (Kelkata).
