= Waña Quta =

Waña Quta (Aymara for "dry lake", also spelled Guañacota, Huaña Khota, Huaña Kkota, Huaña Kota, Huaña Q'ota, Huayña Khota, Huañakota, Huayñakota, Huna Khota) may refer to:

- Waña Quta (Cochabamba), a lake in the Santiváñez Municipality, Capinota Province, Cochabamba Department, Bolivia
- Waña Quta (La Paz), a lake in the Ichoca Municipality, Inquisivi Province, La Paz Department, Bolivia
- Waña Quta (Oruro), a lake in the Sajama Province, Oruro Department, Bolivia
- Waña Quta (Potosí), a mountain in the Potosí Department, Bolivia
