= Qullqi Chaka Punta =

Mountain in Bolivia

- Location within Bolivia

Highest point
- Elevation: 4,380 m (14,370 ft)
- Coordinates: 19°50′45″S 65°59′23″W

Geography
- Location: Bolivia, Potosí Department
- Parent range: Andes

Qullqi Chaka Punta (Aymara and Quechua qullqi silver, chaka bridge, Quechua punta peak, ridge, "silver bridge peak (or ridge)", also spelled Colquechaca Punta) is a mountain in the Bolivian Andes which reaches a height of approximately 4,380 m (14,370 ft). It is located in the Potosí Department, Antonio Quijarro Province, Porco Municipality. It lies northwest of K'uyka and west of Phujuni.
