= Wila Qullu (Inquisivi) =

Mountain in Bolivia

- Location within Bolivia

Highest point
- Elevation: 4,545 m (14,911 ft)
- Coordinates: 17°30′49″S 66°57′43″W

Geography
- Location: Bolivia; La Paz Department, Inquisivi Province
- Parent range: Andes

Wila Qullu (Aymara wila blood, blood-red, qullu mountain, "red mountain", also spelled Wila Kkollu) is a 4,545-metre-high (14,911 ft) mountain in the Bolivian Andes. It is located in the La Paz Department, Inquisivi Province, Colquiri Municipality. Wila Qullu lies northwest of Iru Pata and Jaqi Jiwata. The Wila Qullu River originates at the mountain. It flows to the Janq'u Quta River ("white lake" river) in the west.
