= Jalsuri =

Mountain in Bolivia

- Location within Bolivia

Highest point
- Elevation: 5,006 m (16,424 ft)
- Coordinates: 20°13′31″S 66°38′57″W

Geography
- Location: Bolivia, Potosí Department
- Parent range: Andes

Jalsuri (Aymara) is a 5,006-metre-high (16,424 ft) mountain in the Andes in Bolivia north-east of Uyuni. It is situated in the Potosí Department, Antonio Quijarro Province, in the east of the Uyuni Municipality, at the border with the Tomave Municipality. Jasuri lies south-east of the mountain Kusuña (Cosuna, Cosuña).
