= Wila Nasa =

Mountain in Bolivia

- Location within Bolivia

Highest point
- Elevation: 5,140 m (16,860 ft)
- Coordinates: 19°56′06″S 66°33′09″W

Geography
- Location: Bolivia, Potosí Department
- Parent range: Andes

Wila Nasa (Aymara ''wila red, nasa nose, "red nose") is a mountain in the Andes of Bolivia which reaches a height of approximately 5,140-metre (16,864 ft). It is situated in the Potosí Department, Antonio Quijarro Province, Tomave Municipality. Wila Nasa lies southwest of Kuntur Chukuña.
