= Pirwani (disambiguation) =

Pirwani (Aymara pirwa, piwra granary, -ni a suffix to indicate ownership, "the one with a granary", Hispanicized spellings Pirhuane, Pirhuani, Piruane, Piruani) may refer to:

- Pirwani, a mountain in the Moquegua Region, Peru
- Pirwani (Bolivia), a mountain in the Potosí Department, Bolivia
- Pirwani (Carabaya), a mountain in the Carabaya Province, Puno Region, Peru
- Pirwani (Cusco), a mountain in the Cusco Region, Peru
- Pirwani (Melgar), a mountain in the Melgar Province, Puno Region, Peru
