= Iskayuni =

Mountain in Bolivia

- Location within Bolivia

Highest point
- Elevation: 5,320 m (17,450 ft)
- Coordinates: 17°02′02″S 67°19′45″W

Geography
- Location: Bolivia; La Paz Department
- Parent range: Andes

Iskayuni (Aymara iskayu headdress, -ni a suffix, "the one with the headdress", also spelled Escayuni) is a mountain in the Bolivian Andes which reaches a height of approximately 5,320 m (17,450 ft). It is located in the La Paz Department, Inquisivi Province, Quime Municipality. Iskayuni lies northeast of Wisk'achani.
