= Jach'a Jawira (La Paz-Oruro) =

- Etymology: Aymara

Location
- Country: Bolivia
- Region: La Paz Department, Oruro Department

Physical characteristics
- Source
  - location: Loayza Province

Basin features
- Tributaries
  - left: Qallun Uma, Wich'inka Jawira, Wari Umaña, Ch'iyar Jawira
  - right: Urnuni

Jach'a Jawira (Aymara jach'a big, great, jawira river, "great river", hispanicized names río Jachcha Jahuira, río Jacha Jahuira Caxata, río Jachcha Jahuira de Caxata) which later is named Q'ara Qullu and Waña Jawira is a Bolivian river in the La Paz Department and in the Oruro Department. Its waters flow towards Uru Uru Lake.

The river originates near the mountain Wisk'achani in the La Paz Department, Loayza Province, Yaco Municipality. Its direction is to the south while it flows along the border of the Ichoca Municipality of the Inquisivi Province and the Yaco Municipality. Some of its affluents are Ch'iyar Jawira ("black river", Chiar Jahuira), Wari Umaña (Wari Umana) and Wich'inka Jawira ("tail river", Huichinca Jahuira) from the left and Urnuni (Hornum, Hornuni) from the right. After Qallun Uma (Callun Uma), a left tributary, reaches Jach'a Jawira in the Caracollo Municipality of the Cercado Province the river is named Q'ara Qullu ("bare mountain", Caracollo). Within the municipality it later receives the name Waña Jawira ("dry river", Huana Jahuira).
