= Pichaqani (Bolivia) =

Mountain in Bolivia

- Location within Bolivia

Highest point
- Elevation: 4,570 m (14,990 ft)
- Coordinates: 17°30′25″S 66°53′27″W

Geography
- Location: Bolivia; La Paz Department, Inquisivi Province
- Parent range: Andes

Pichaqani (Aymara pichaqa, phichaqa, piqacha a big needle, -ni a suffix, "the one with a big needle", also spelled Pichacani) is a 4,570-metre-high (14,990 ft) mountain in the Bolivian Andes. It is located in the La Paz Department, Inquisivi Province, Colquiri Municipality. Pichaqani lies northeast of Kuntur Samaña. The Qala Uta River ("stone house" river, Khala Uta) flows along its western slope.
