= Muru Qullu =

Mountain in Bolivia

- Location within Bolivia

Highest point
- Elevation: 4,613 m (15,135 ft)
- Coordinates: 19°43′46″S 66°02′18″W

Geography
- Location: Bolivia; Potosí Department
- Parent range: Andes

Muru Qullu (Aymara muru truncated, qullu mountain, "truncated mountain", also spelled Moro Kkollu) is a 4,613-metre-high (15,135 ft) mountain in Bolivia. It is located in the Potosí Department, Antonio Quijarro Province, Porco Municipality. It lies southwest of Warawara Lake.
