= Apachita (Inquisivi) =

Mountain in Bolivia

- Location within Bolivia

Highest point
- Elevation: 4,673 m (15,331 ft)
- Coordinates: 17°27′54″S 67°07′26″W

Geography
- Location: Bolivia; La Paz Department, Inquisivi Province
- Parent range: Andes

Apachita (Aymara for the place of transit of an important pass in the principal routes of the Andes; name for a stone cairn in the Andes, a little pile of rocks built along the trail in the high mountains, "three streams (or crevices)", also spelled Apacheta) is a 4,673 m (15,331 ft) mountain in the Bolivian Andes. It is located in the La Paz Department, Inquisivi Province, Colquiri Municipality. Apachita lies southwest of Kimsa Q'awa.
