= Qala Piwrani =

Mountain in Bolivia

- Location within Bolivia

Highest point
- Elevation: 4,571 m (14,997 ft)
- Coordinates: 17°30′48″S 66°55′51″W

Geography
- Location: Bolivia; La Paz Department, Inquisivi Province
- Parent range: Andes

Qala Piwrani (Aymara qala stone, piwra granary, -ni a suffix, "the one with a stone granary", also spelled Khala Piurani) is a 4,571-metre-high (14,997 ft) mountain in the Bolivian Andes. It is located in the La Paz Department, Inquisivi Province, Colquiri Municipality. Qala Pirwani lies northeast of Iru Pata and Jaqi Jiwata.
