= Paquni =

Mountain in Bolivia

- Location within Bolivia

Highest point
- Elevation: 4,838 m (15,873 ft)
- Coordinates: 19°43′21″S 66°08′56″W

Geography
- Location: Bolivia; Potosí Department
- Parent range: Andes

Paquni (Aymara paqu a kind of edible herb, -ni a suffix, "the one with the paqu herbs", Hispanicized spelling Pacuni) is a 4,838-metre-high (15,873 ft) mountain in the Potosí Department of Bolivia. It is located in the Antonio Quijarro Province, Tomave Municipality, northeast of the Jatun Mundo Quri Warani volcano.
