= T'ula T'ulani (Inquisivi) =

Mountain in Bolivia

- Location within Bolivia

Highest point
- Elevation: 4,320 m (14,170 ft)
- Coordinates: 17°31′33″S 66°58′51″W

Geography
- Location: Bolivia; La Paz Department, Inquisivi Province
- Parent range: Andes

T'ula T'ulani (Aymara t'ula wood, burning material, the reduplication indicates that there is a group of something, -ni a suffix to indicate ownership, "the one with a lot of wood (or burning material)", also spelled Thola Tholani) is a mountain in the Bolivian Andes which reaches a height of approximately 4,320 m (14,170 ft). It is located in the La Paz Department, Inquisivi Province, Colquiri Municipality, south of the village of Junt'u Uma ("hot water", Juntu Huma). T'ula T'ulani lies southwest of Wila Qullu. The Wila Qullu River and the Janq'u Quta River flow along its slopes.
