= Kimsa Willk'i =

Mountain in Bolivia

- Location within Bolivia

Highest point
- Elevation: 5,032 m (16,509 ft)
- Coordinates: 17°03′33″S 67°18′59″W

Geography
- Location: Bolivia; La Paz Department, Loayza Province
- Parent range: Andes

Kimsa Willk'i (Aymara kimsa three, willk'i gap "three gaps", also spelled Quimsa Willkhi) is a 5,032-metre-high (16,509 ft) mountain in the Bolivian Andes. It is located in the La Paz Department, Inquisivi Province, in the south of the Quime Municipality. Kimsa Willk'i is situated south-east of the mountain Wisk'achani. The lakes Muyu Quta (Muyu Khota) and Wiska Quta (Wisca Khota) lie at its feet, north-west of it.

The river Quta K'uchu ("lake corner", Khotakhuchu) which later is called Tres Cruzes (Spanish for "three crosses") originates at the mountain. It flows to the south-west as a tributary of Río Monte Blanco (Spanish for "white mountain river").
