= Wisk'achani =

Wisk'achani (Aymara for "the one with a viscacha", Hispanicized spellings Huiscachane, Huiscachani, Viscachane, Viscachani, Vizcachane, Vizcachani) may refer to:

- Chumpi, Wisk'achani, Hatunrit'i, Ñañuluma or Yanaluma, a mountain in the Pitumarca District, Canchis Province, and in the Ocongate District, Quispicanchi Province, Cusco Region, Peru
- Chawpi Urqu or Wisk'achani, a mountain on the border of Bolivia and Peru
- Wisk'achani (Aroma), a mountain in the Aroma Province, La Paz Department, Bolivia
- Wisk'achani (Ayopaya), a mountain in the Ayopaya Province, Cochabamba Department, Bolivia
- Wisk'achani (Camanti-Marcapata), a mountain in the districts of Camanti and Marcapata, Quispicanchi Province, Cusco Region, Peru
- Wisk'achani (Cusco-Puno), a mountain on the border of the Cusco Region and the Puno Region, Peru
- Wisk'achani (Ingavi), a mountain in the Ingavi Province, La Paz Department, Bolivia
- Wisk'achani (Inquisivi-Loayza), a mountain on the border of the Inquisivi Province and the Loayza Province, La Paz Department, Bolivia
- Wisk'achani (Loayza), a mountain in the Malla Municipality, Loayza Province, La Paz Department, Bolivia
- Wisk'achani (Luribay), a mountain in the Luribay Municipality, Loayza Province, La Paz Department, Bolivia
- Wisk'achani (Marcapata-Ocongate), a mountain in the districts of Marcapata and Ocongate, Quispicanchi Province, Cusco Region, Peru
- Wisk'achani (Murillo), a mountain in the Murillo Province, La Paz Department, Bolivia
- Wisk'achani (Oruro), a mountain in the Oruro Department, Bolivia
- Wisk'achani (Quillacollo), a mountain in the Quillacollo Province, Cochabamba Department, Bolivia
- Wisk'achani (Sud Yungas), a mountain in the Sud Yungas Province, La Paz Department, Bolivia
