= Quyqu =

Mountain in Bolivia

- Location within Bolivia

Highest point
- Elevation: 4,860 m (15,940 ft)
- Coordinates: 19°43′50″S 66°08′49″W

Geography
- Location: Bolivia; Potosí Department
- Parent range: Andes

Quyqu (Aymara for a kind of instrument similar to the qina, also spelled Cuyco) is a mountain in Bolivia which reaches a height of approximately 4,860 m (15,945 ft). It is located in the Potosí Department, Antonio Quijarro Province, Porco Municipality. It lies southwest of Warawara Lake.
