= Pirwani (Bolivia) =

Mountain in Bolivia

- Location within Bolivia

Highest point
- Elevation: 4,840 m (15,880 ft)
- Coordinates: 19°29′06″S 66°27′13″W

Geography
- Location: Bolivia, Potosí Department
- Parent range: Andes

Pirwani (Aymara pirwa, piwra granary, -ni a suffix to indicate ownership, "the one with a granary", Hispanicized spelling Pirhuani) is a mountain in the Andes of Bolivia, about 4,840 metres (15,879 ft) high. It is situated in the Potosí Department, Antonio Quijarro Province, in the east of the Uyuni Municipality. Janq'u Qullu lies south-west of the mountains Warachi Qullu and Janq'u Qullu. It is situated east of the Chillawa River (Chillahua) which flows to the south.
