= Wisk'achayuq =

Wisk'achayuq (Quechua: wisk'acha viscacha, -yuq a suffix, "the one with the viscachas", also spelled Huisca Chayoc, Huiscachayoc, Huiscachayocc, Viscachayoc, Viscachayocc, Viscachayoj, Vizcachayoc, Vizcachayocc, Vizcachayoj, Wiscachayo) may refer to:

- Wisk'achayuq (Apurímac), a mountain in the Apurímac Region, Peru
- Wisk'achayuq (Bolivia), a mountain in Bolivia
- Wisk'achayuq (Huancavelica), a mountain in the Huancavelica Region, Peru

== See also ==
- Wisk'acha
- Wisk'achani (disambiguation)
