= Uyuni Municipality =

- Municipality
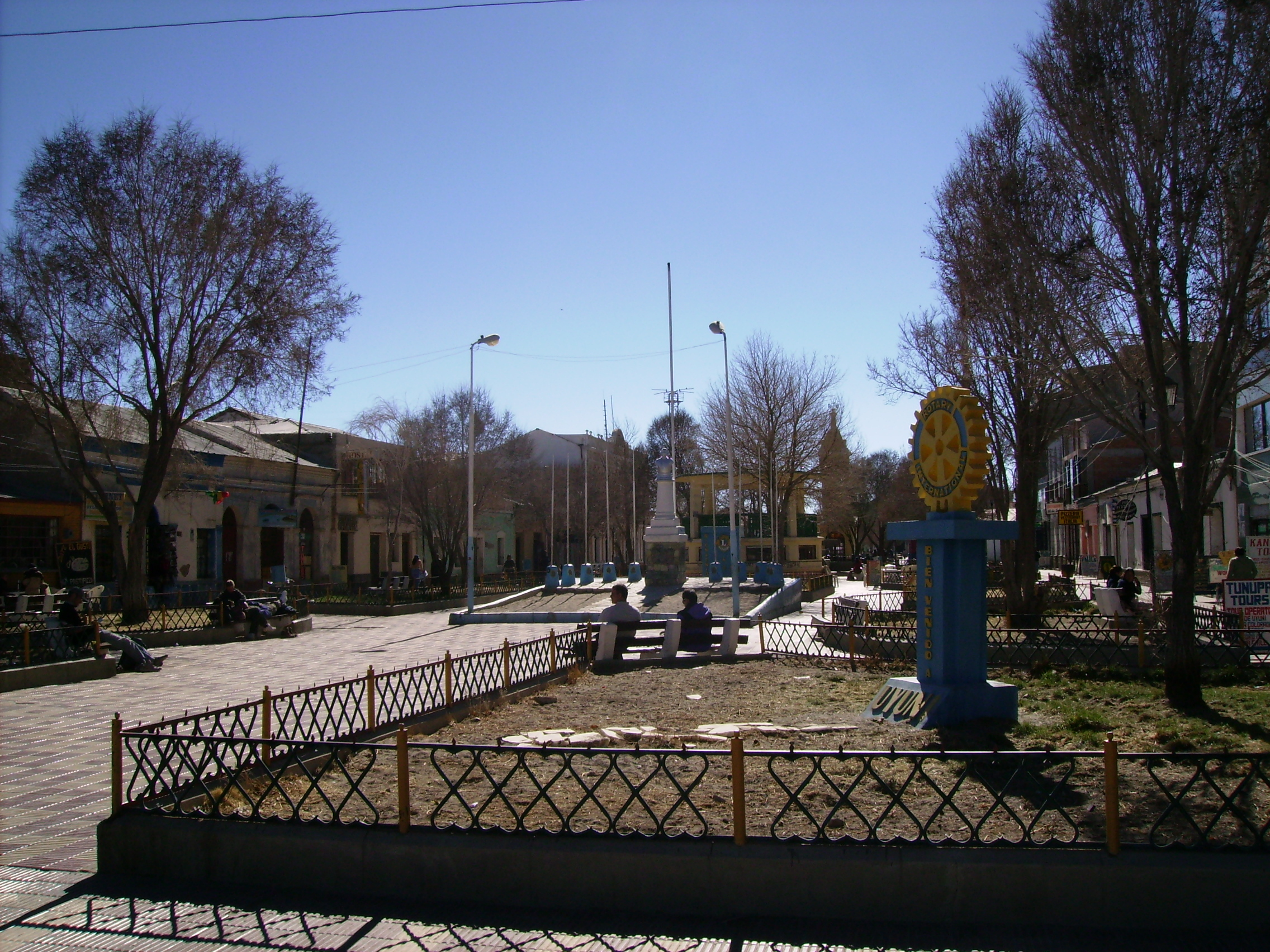
- Uyuni

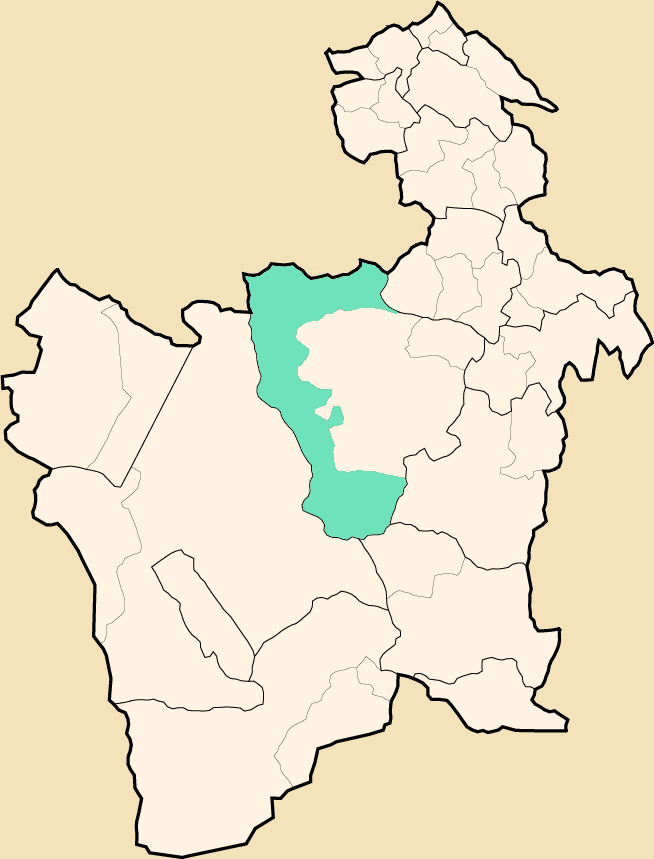
- Location within Potosí Department

- Location within Bolivia
- Coordinates: 20°3′S 66°56′W
- Country: Bolivia
- Department: Potosí Department
- Province: Antonio Quijarro Province
- Seat: Uyuni
- Elevation: 11,980 ft (3,650 m)

Population (2001)
  - Total: 18,705
  - Ethnicities: Quechua Aymara
- Time zone: UTC-4 (BOT)

Uyuni Municipality is the first municipal section of the Antonio Quijarro Province in the Potosí Department in Bolivia. Its seat is Uyuni.

== Geography ==
The municipality lies at the Uyuni salt flat.

Some of the highest mountains of the municipality are listed below:

- Jach'a Punta
- Jalsuri
- Janq'u Qullu
- Kuntur Ikiña
- Pirwani
- Sura Chata
- Warachi Qullu
- Wila Qullu

== Subdivision ==
The municipality consists of the following cantons:

- Chacala
- Coroma
- Huanchaca
- Pulacayo
- Uyuni

== The people ==
The people are predominantly indigenous citizens of Quechua and Aymara descent.

Ethnic group	%
Quechua	52.9
Aymara	24.2
Guaraní, Chiquitos, Moxos	0.2
Not indigenous	22.6
Other indigenous groups	0.2
