= Silla Q'asa (Potosí) =

Mountain in Bolivia

- Location within Bolivia

Highest point
- Elevation: 4,662 m (15,295 ft)
- Coordinates: 19°41′18″S 65°57′42″W

Geography
- Location: Bolivia, Potosí Department
- Parent range: Andes

Silla Q'asa (Quechua silla gravel, q'asa mountain pass, "gravel pass", also spelled Silla Khasa) is a 4,662-metre-high (15,295 ft) mountain in the Bolivian Andes. It is located in the Potosí Department, Antonio Quijarro Province, Porco Municipality.
