= Phujuni =

Mountain in Bolivia

- Location within Bolivia

Highest point
- Elevation: 4,740 m (15,550 ft)
- Coordinates: 19°50′36″S 65°58′23″W

Geography
- Location: Bolivia, Potosí Department
- Parent range: Andes

Phujuni (Aymara phuju spring of water, -ni a suffix, "the one with a spring", also spelled Fucuni) is a mountain in the Bolivian Andes which reaches a height of approximately 4,740 m (15,550 ft). It is located in the Potosí Department, Antonio Quijarro Province, Porco Municipality. It lies northwest of K'uyka and northeast of Qullqi Chaka Punta.
