= Kimsa Q'awa =

Mountain in Bolivia

- Location within Bolivia

Highest point
- Elevation: 4,543 m (14,905 ft)
- Coordinates: 17°27′09″S 67°05′41″W

Geography
- Location: Bolivia; La Paz Department
- Parent range: Andes

Kimsa Q'awa (Aymara kimsa three, q'awa little river, ditch, crevice, fissure, gap in the earth, "three streams (or crevices)", also spelled Quimsa Khaua) is a 4,543 m (14,905 ft) mountain in the Bolivian Andes. It is located in the La Paz Department, Inquisivi Province, Colquiri Municipality, southeast of Colquiri.
