= Suchusqa =

Mountain in Bolivia

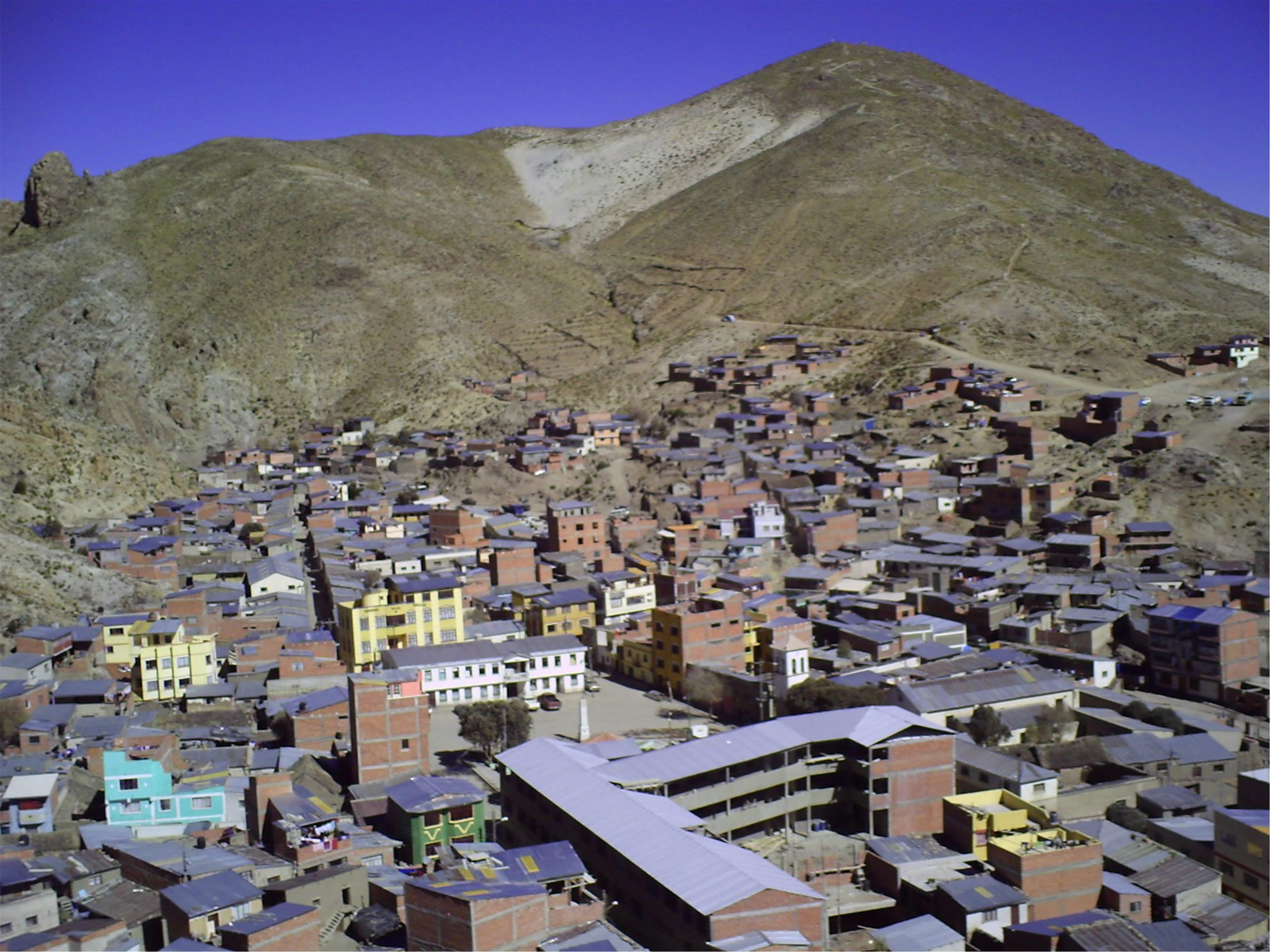
- The north-eastern slope of Suchusqa as seen from Porco

Highest point
- Elevation: 4,280 m (14,040 ft)
- Coordinates: 19°48′14″S 66°00′20″W

Geography
- Location within Bolivia
- Location: Bolivia, Potosí Department
- Parent range: Andes

Suchusqa (Quechua suchuy to slide, -sqa a suffix, "slidden", also spelled Suchuskha) is a mountain in the Bolivian Andes which reaches a height of approximately 4,280 m (14,040 ft). It is located in the Potosí Department, Antonio Quijarro Province, Porco Municipality, southwest of Porco.
