= Mount Uyuni =

Mountain in Potosí, Bolivia

Uyuni
- Location within Bolivia

Highest point
- Elevation: 5,084 m (16,680 ft)
- Coordinates: 20°00′S 66°35′W

Geography
- Location: Bolivia, Potosí Department, Antonio Quijarro Province, Tomave Municipality
- Parent range: Andes

Uyuni (Aymara, uyu pen (enclosure), yard, cemetery, -ni a suffix to indicate ownership, "the one that has got a pen", "the one with a pen") is a mountain in the Andes of Bolivia, about 5,084 metres (16,680 ft) high. It is situated in the Potosí Department, Antonio Quijarro Province, Tomave Municipality, Tomave Canton, east of the Uyuni salt flat and south-west of the Nuevo Mundo volcano (Jatun Mundo Quri Warani) and Kuntur Chukuña.

== See also ==
- List of mountains in the Andes
