= Qiwiña Q'asa =

Mountain in Bolivia

- Location within Bolivia

Highest point
- Elevation: 4,140 m (13,580 ft)
- Coordinates: 19°47′52″S 66°01′09″W

Geography
- Location: Bolivia, Potosí Department
- Parent range: Andes

Qiwiña Q'asa (Quechua qiwiña, qillwa, qiwlla gull, q'asa mountain pass, "gull pass", also spelled Khihuiña Khasa) is a mountain in the Bolivian Andes which reaches a height of approximately 4,140 m (13,580 ft). It is located in the Potosí Department, Antonio Quijarro Province, Porco Municipality, west of Porco.
