= Chuqi Warani =

Mountain in Bolivia

- Location within Bolivia

Highest point
- Elevation: 5,388 m (17,677 ft)
- Coordinates: 19°48′06″S 66°29′14″W

Geography
- Location: Bolivia; Potosí Department
- Parent range: Andes

Chuqi Warani (Aymara or Quechua, Hispanicized spellings Choque Huarani, Choquehuarani) is a 5,388-metre-high (17,677 ft) mountain in Bolivia. It is located in the Potosí Department, Antonio Quijarro Province, Tomave Municipality. It lies southwest of the Jatun Mundo Quri Warani volcano. In the map of the Bolivian Instituto Geográfico Militar the term Chaupi Mundo (Quechua chawpi central) is added under Cerro Choquehuarani. This may be an alternate name (as with Pacha Qullu (or Kimsa Misa), which is also regarded as Pacha Kkollu Quimsa Misa) or a supplement.
