= Ichoca, Bolivia =

Ichoca
- Town
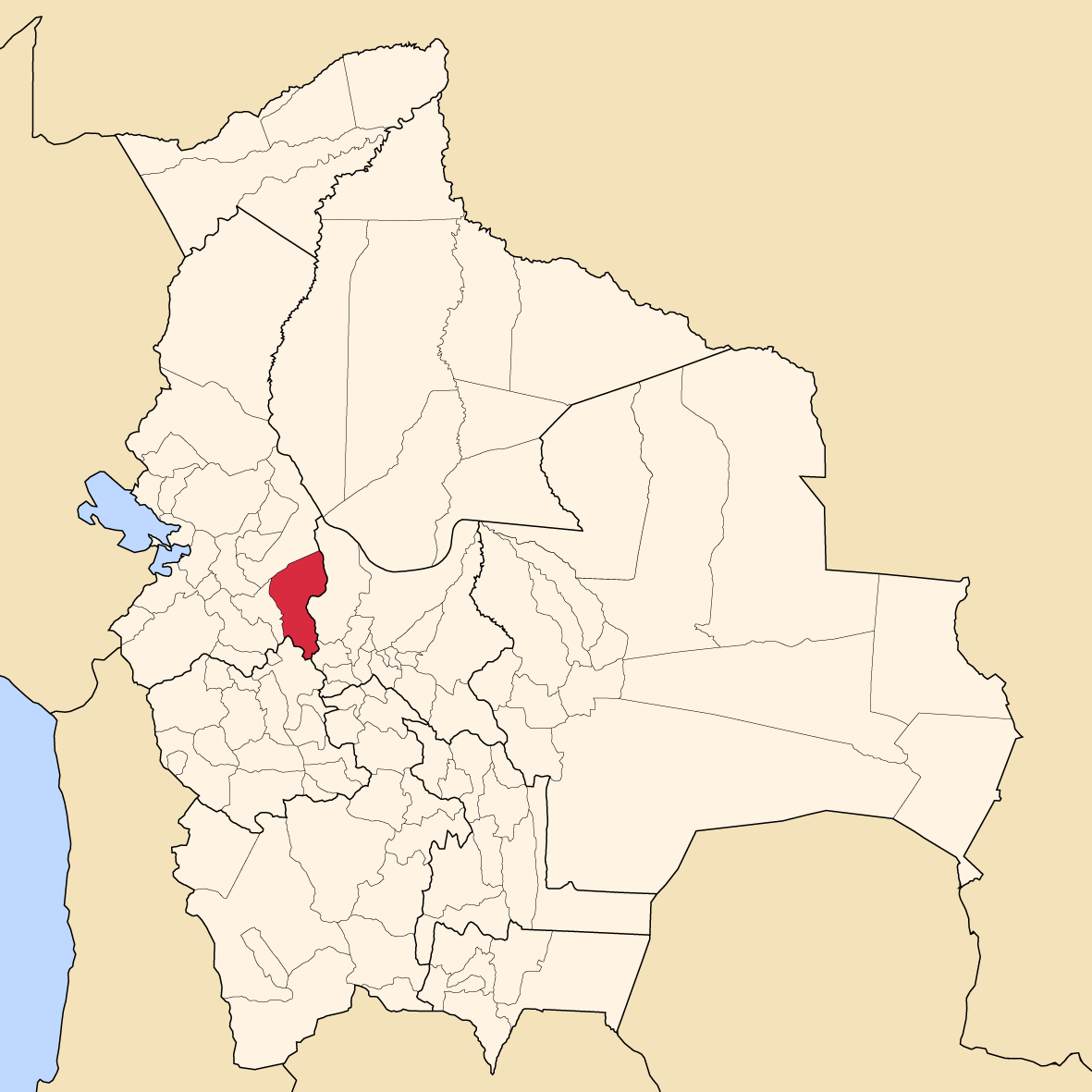

- Location within Bolivia
- Coordinates: 17°09′S 67°11′W
- Country: Bolivia
- Department: La Paz Department
- Province: Inquisivi Province
- Municipality: Ichoca Municipality

Population (2001)
  - Total: 517
- Time zone: UTC-4 (BOT)

Ichoca is a location in the La Paz Department in Bolivia. It is the seat of the Ichoca Municipality, the fifth municipal section of the Inquisivi Province.
