= Pukarani (Potosí) =

Mountain in Bolivia

- Location within Bolivia

Highest point
- Elevation: 4,060 m (13,320 ft)
- Coordinates: 19°46′36″S 66°01′17″W

Geography
- Location: Bolivia, Potosí Department
- Parent range: Andes

Pukarani (Aymara pukara fortress, -ni a suffix, "the one with a fortress", also spelled Pucarani) is a mountain in the Bolivian Andes which reaches a height of approximately 4,060 m (13,320 ft). It is located in the Potosí Department, Antonio Quijarro Province, Porco Municipality.
