= Pukara (Potosí) =

Mountain in Bolivia

- Location within Bolivia

Highest point
- Elevation: 4,100 m (13,500 ft)
- Coordinates: 19°43′47″S 65°52′53″W

Geography
- Location: Bolivia, Potosí Department
- Parent range: Andes

Pukara (Aymara and Quechua for fortress, also spelled Pucara) is a mountain in the Bolivian Andes which reaches a height of approximately 4,100 m (13,500 ft). It is located in the Potosí Department, Antonio Quijarro Province, Porco Municipality. It lies east of the village of Challwiri (Challviri).
