= Licoma =

- Town
- Location within Bolivia
- Coordinates: 16°48′S 67°12′W
- Country: Bolivia
- Department: La Paz Department
- Province: Inquisivi Province
- Municipality: Licoma Pampa Municipality

Government
  - Mayor: José Quispe Arias (2007)

Population (2001)
  - Total: 1,036
- Time zone: UTC-4 (BOT)

Licoma is a location in the La Paz Department in Bolivia. It is the seat of the Licoma Pampa Municipality, the sixth municipal section of the Inquisivi Province.
