= Uru Uru Lake =

Lake in Bolivia

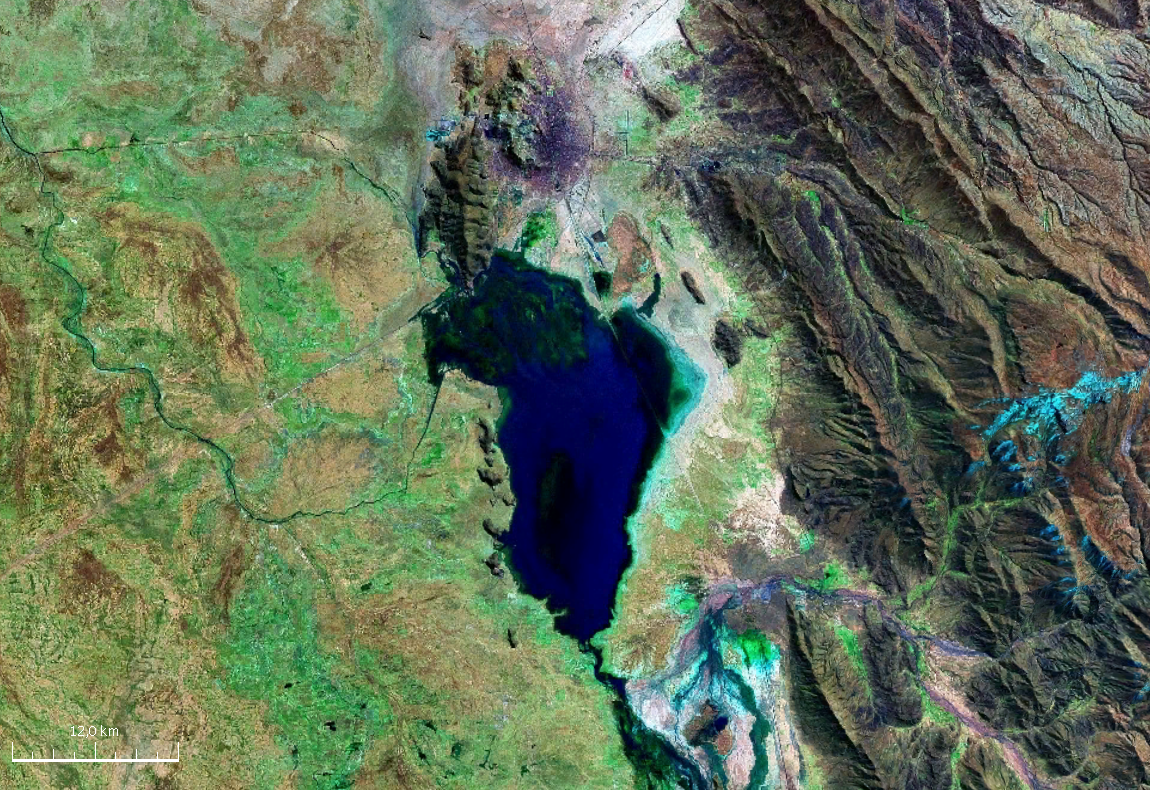

- Location within Bolivia Location within South America
- Interactive map of Uru Uru Lake
- Location: Oruro Department
- Coordinates: 18°5′40″S 67°5′46″W
- Primary inflows: Río Desaguadero
- Primary outflows: Río Desaguadero, Laq'a Jawira
- Basin countries: Bolivia
- Surface area: 214 km^{2} (83 sq mi)
- Max. depth: 1.5 m (4 ft 11 in)
- Surface elevation: 3,686 m (12,093 ft)
- Settlements: Oruro, Machacamarca

Ramsar Wetland
- Official name: Lagos Poopó y Uru Uru
- Designated: 11 July 2002
- Reference no.: 1181

Uru Uru Lake is a lake in the Oruro Department in Bolivia. It is fed by the Desaguadero River and the Jach'a Jawira. It is situated at an elevation of 3,686 m, its surface area is 214 km^{2}.

The lake is formed by the flow of the Desaguadero River at its mouth into Lake Poopó, over the extensive sedimentation known as "Santo Tomás" from the small hermitage found there that was completely inundated. The formation dates to 1962. The river connects Lake Titicaca and Lake Poopó.

== Ecology ==
The lake used to be a tourist attraction for boating and fishing, as it contained a large number of fish. During a long drought in 2016, the lake lost almost all of its water. This was described by local media and experts as an environmental catastrophe caused by several factors, including climate change and the use of water for mining.

As of 2021, a large part of the lake is covered by trash. Much of it is plastic from nearby Oruro where residents dump their refuse. There is also contamination from run-off from nearby mines as the town Oruro is an industrial mining center. The lake is polluted by heavy metals such as cadmium, zinc, and arsenic.

== Gallery ==
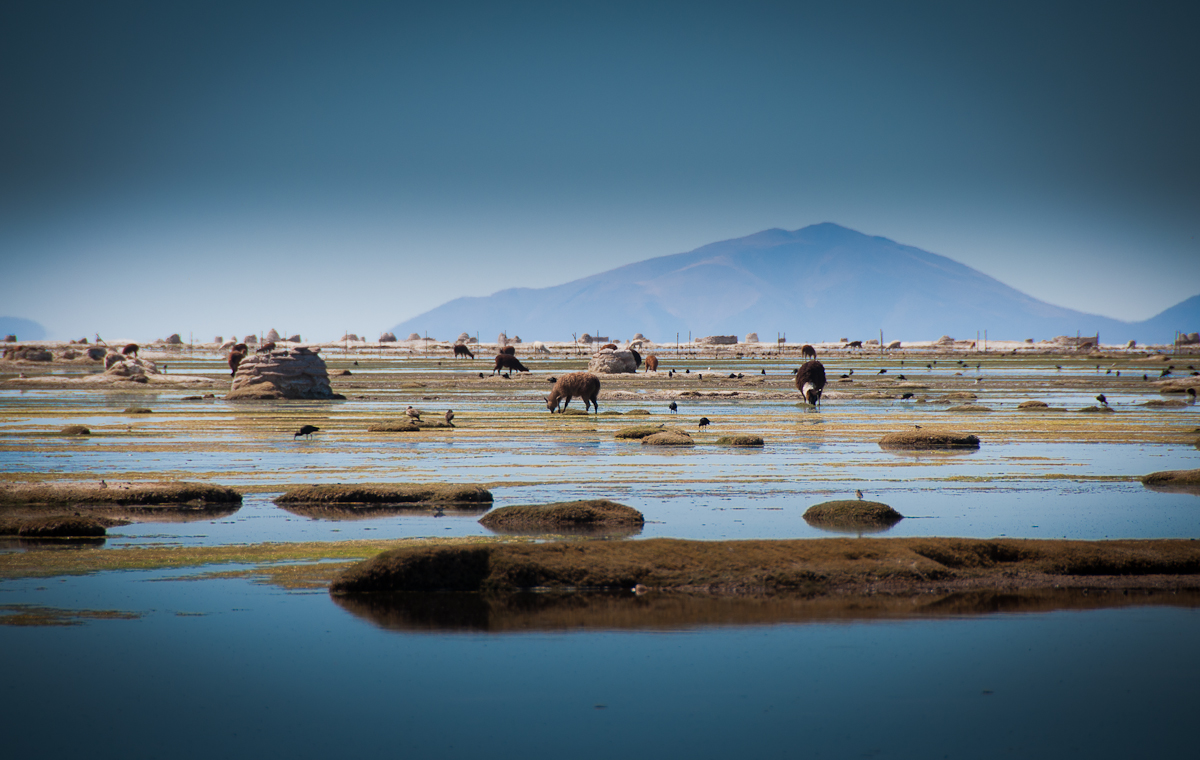

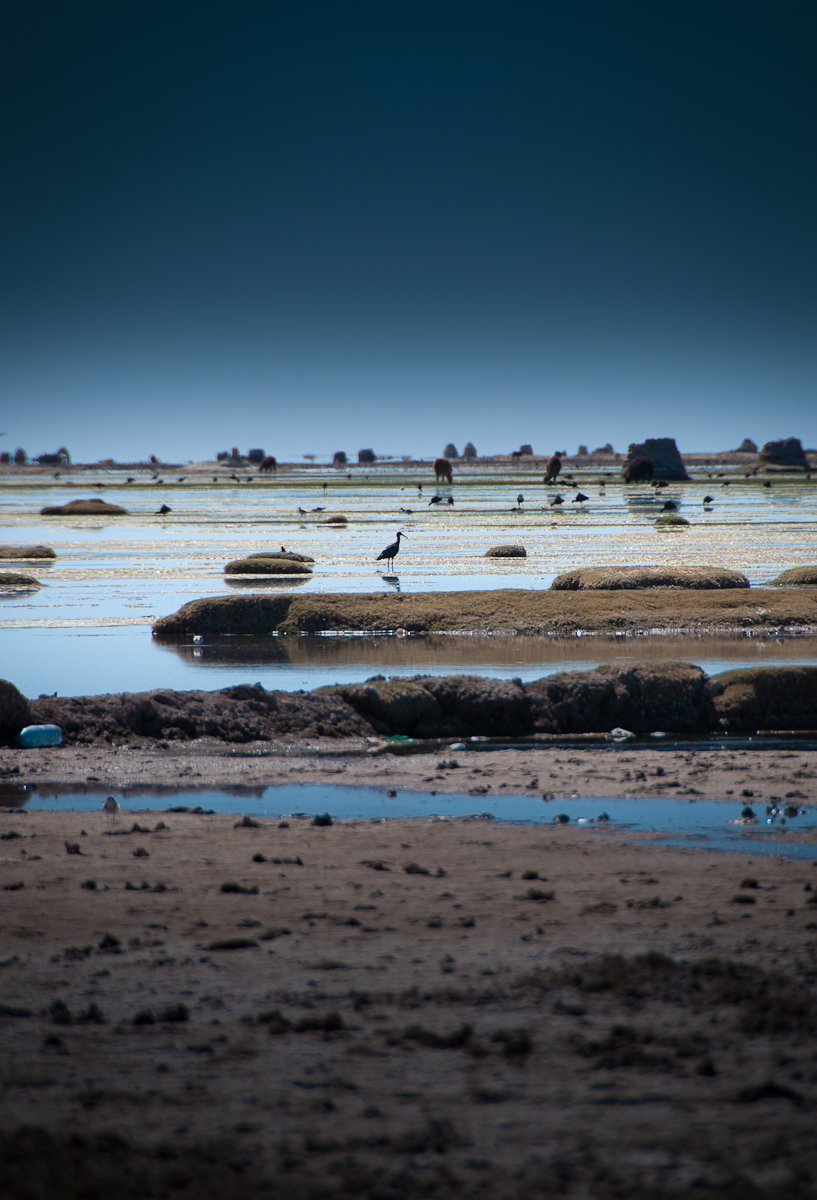

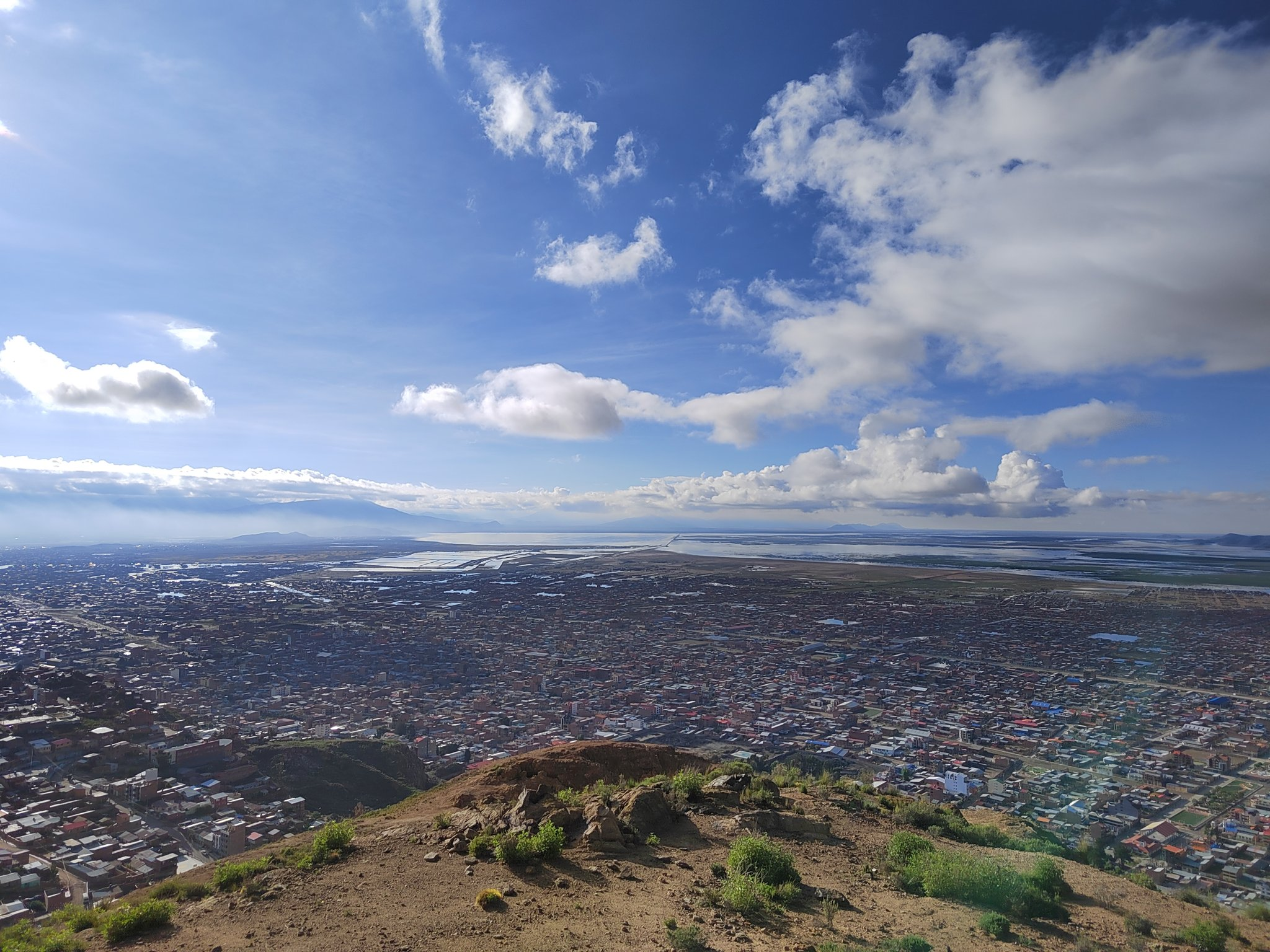

== See also ==
- Jach'a Jawira
