= Jach'a Warmi Qullu =

Mountain in Bolivia

- Location within Bolivia

Highest point
- Elevation: 4,619 m (15,154 ft)
- Coordinates: 17°32′36″S 66°56′11″W

Geography
- Location: Bolivia; La Paz Department, Inquisivi Province
- Parent range: Andes

Jach'a Warmi Qullu (Aymara jach'a big, warmi woman, qullu mountain, "big woman's mountain", also spelled Jachcha Huarmi Kkollu) is a 4,619-metre-high (15,154 ft) mountain in the Bolivian Andes. It is located in the La Paz Department, Inquisivi Province, Colquiri Municipality. It lies southwest of Kuntur Samaña and southeast of Iru Pata. The peak northeast of Jach'a Warmi Qullu is named Warmi Qullu. It has the same height.
