= Yuraq Q'asa (Bolivia) =

Mountain in Bolivia

- Location within Bolivia

Highest point
- Elevation: 4,320 m (14,170 ft)
- Coordinates: 19°45′12″S 65°48′41″W

Geography
- Location: Bolivia, Potosí Department
- Parent range: Andes

Yuraq Q'asa (Quechua yuraq white, q'asa mountain pass, "white pass", also spelled Yuraj Kasa) is a mountain in the Bolivian Andes which reaches a height of approximately 4,320 m (14,170 ft). It is located in the Potosí Department, at the border of the Antonio Quijarro Province, Porco Municipality, and the Tomás Frías Province, Potosí Municipality. The Misk'i Mayu flows along its eastern slope. It is a left tributary of the Jatun Mayu.
