= Jach'a Pukara (Inquisivi) =

Mountain in Bolivia

- Location within Bolivia

Highest point
- Elevation: 3,386 m (11,109 ft)
- Coordinates: 16°45′53″S 67°22′11″W

Geography
- Location: Bolivia, La Paz Department, Inquisivi Province
- Parent range: Andes

Jach'a Pukara (Aymara jach'a big, pukara fortress, "big fortress", Hispanicized spelling Jachcha Pucara) is a 3,386-metre-high (11,109 ft) mountain in the Andes of Bolivia. It is situated in the La Paz Department, Inquisivi Province, Quime Municipality. Jach'a Pukara lies at the river Chaka Jawira whose waters flow to the La Paz River in the north.
