= Kimsa Llallawa =

Mountain in Bolivia

- Location within Bolivia

Highest point
- Elevation: 4,382 m (14,377 ft)
- Coordinates: 17°23′28″S 67°02′31″W

Geography
- Location: Bolivia; La Paz Department, Inquisivi Province
- Parent range: Andes

Kimsa Llallawa (Aymara kimsa three, llallawa a monstrous potato (like two potatoes) or animal, also spelled Quimsa Llallagua) is a 4,382 m (14,377 ft) mountain in the Bolivian Andes. It is located in the La Paz Department, Inquisivi Province, Colquiri Municipality, east of Colquiri.
