= Porco Municipality =

- Municipality
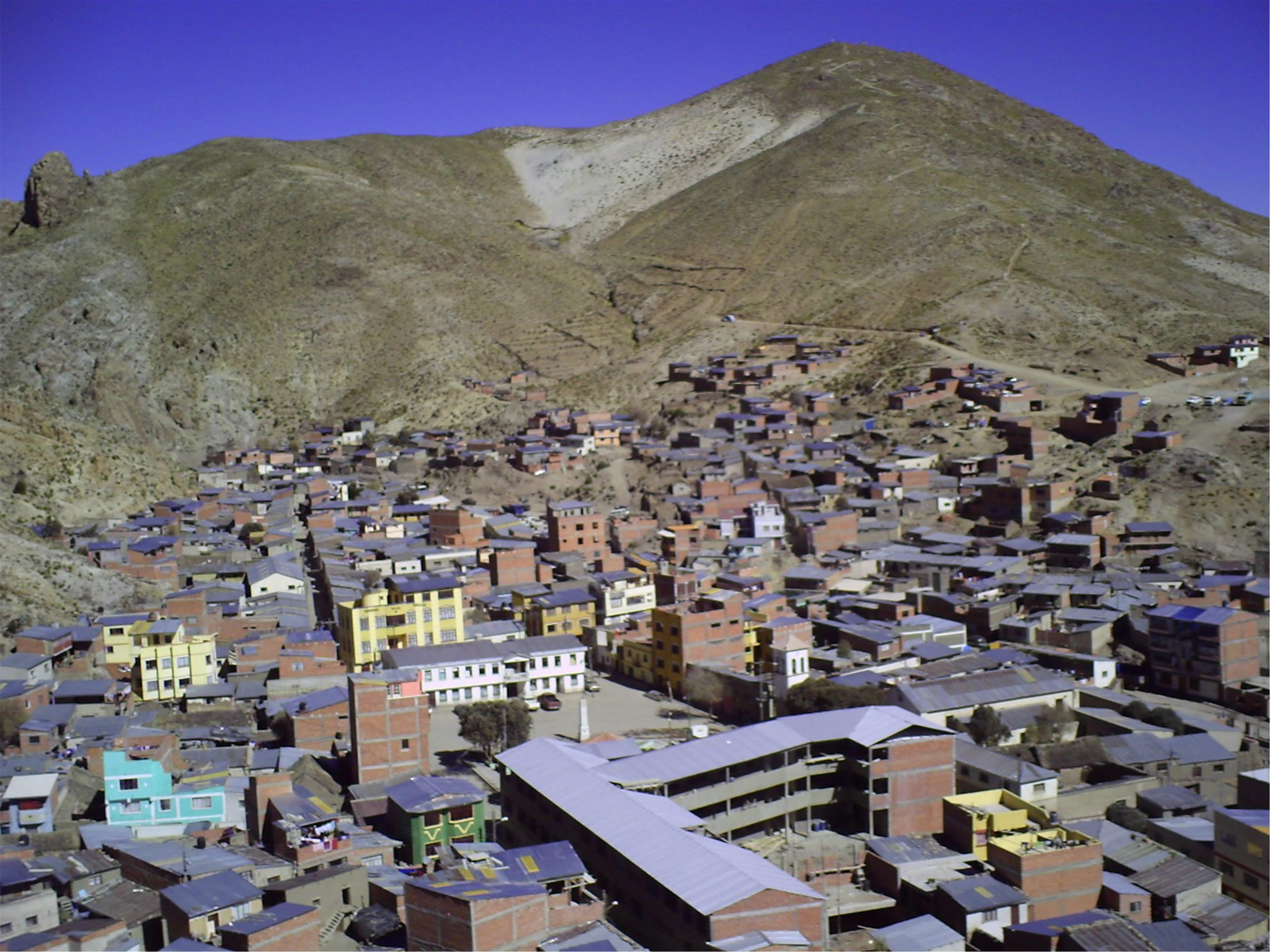
- Porco

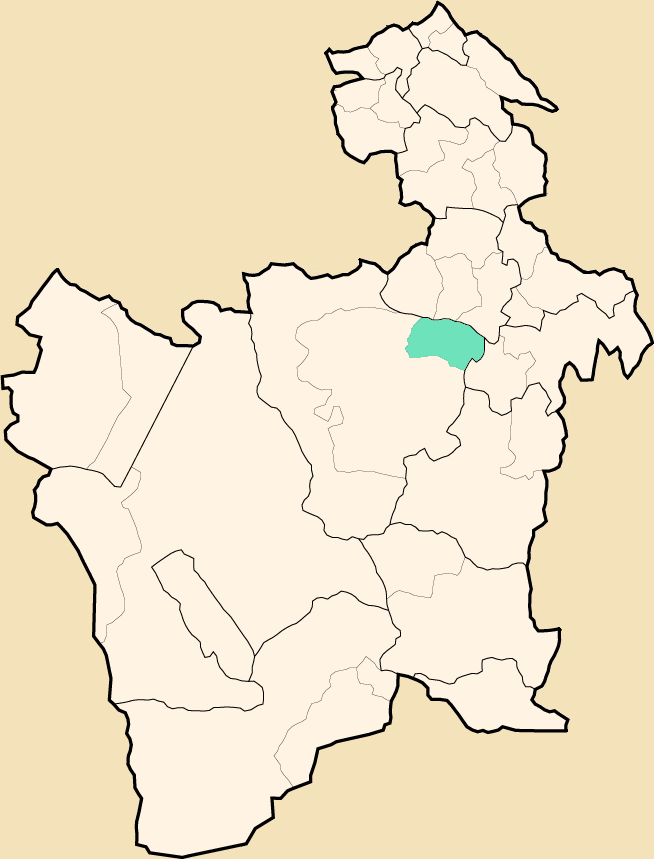
- Location within Potosí Department

- Location within Bolivia
- Coordinates: 19°45′S 66°0′W
- Country: Bolivia
- Department: Potosí Department
- Province: Antonio Quijarro Province
- Seat: Porco

Population (2001)
  - Total: 5,959
  - Ethnicities: Quechua
- Time zone: UTC-4 (BOT)

Porco Municipality is the third municipal section of the Antonio Quijarro Province in the Potosí Department in Bolivia. Its seat is Porco.

== Geography ==
Some of the highest mountains of the municipality are listed below:

- Apa Purqu
- Chachakumiri
- Janq'u Apachita
- Jarmiri
- Jatun Patilla
- Muru Qullu
- Pukara
- Pukara Punta
- Pukarani
- Qiwiña Q'asa
- Quyqu
- Silla Q'asa
- Sillara
- Suchusqa
- Sura Sura
- Urqu Maki
- Wanay
- Wayna Purqu
- Wayna Quta
- Yuraq Q'asa

== Subdivision ==
The municipality consists of the following cantons:

- Churcuita
- Kunturiri
- Karma
- Porco
- Chaquilla

== The people ==
The people are predominantly indigenous citizens of Quechua descent.

Ethnic group	%
Quechua	90.1
Aymara	1.9
Guaraní, Chiquitos, Moxos	0.1
Not indigenous	7.7
Other indigenous groups	0.1

== See also ==
- Warawara Lake
