= Cajuata =

- Town
- Location within Bolivia
- Coordinates: 16°42′S 67°10′W
- Country: Bolivia
- Department: La Paz Department
- Province: Inquisivi Province
- Municipality: Cajuata Municipality

Population (2001)
  - Total: 875
- Time zone: UTC-4 (BOT)

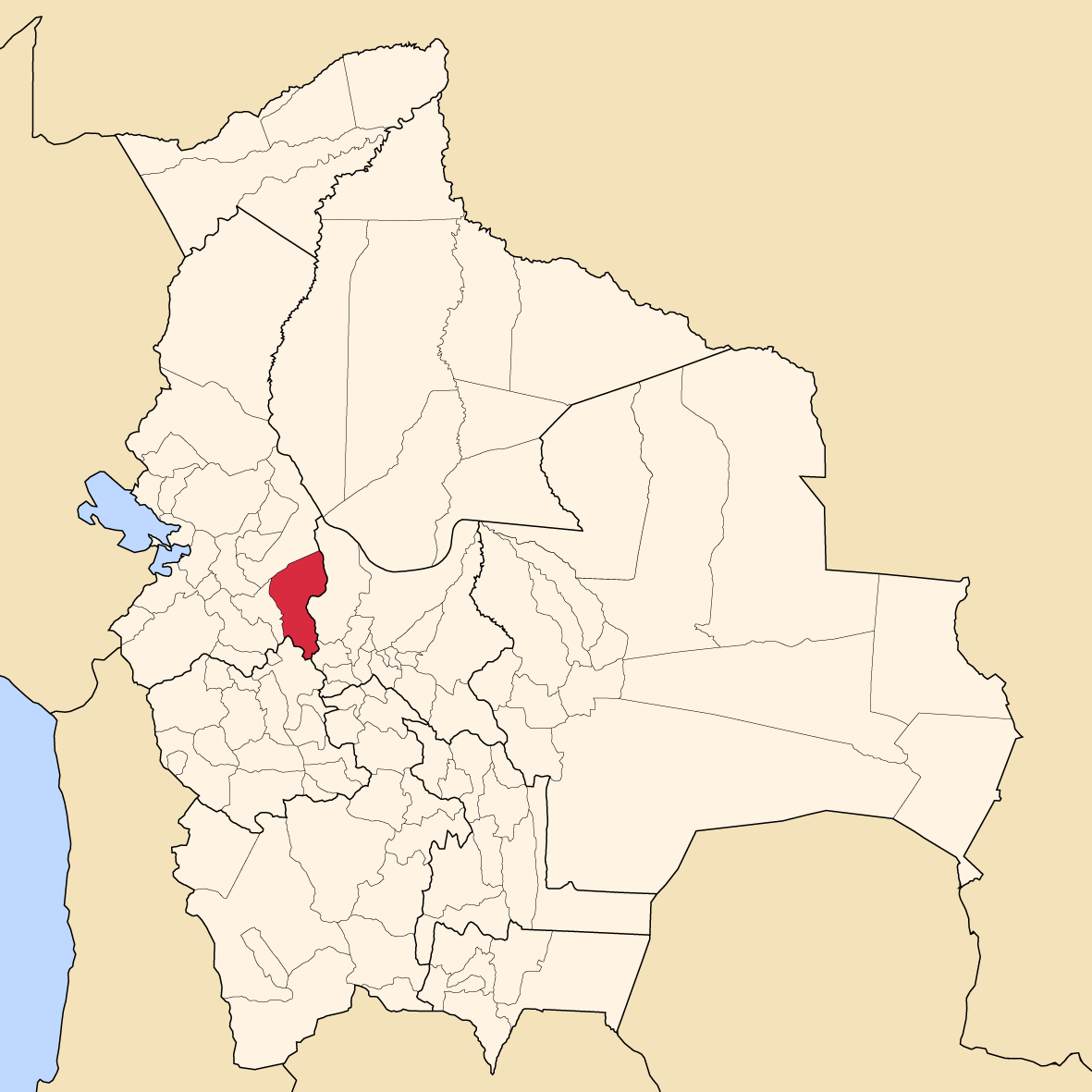
Highlighted map of La Paz in Inquisivi Province, Bolivia

Cajuata (Aymara: Kaqwata) is a location in the La Paz Department in Bolivia. It is the seat of the Cajuata Municipality, the third municipal section of the Inquisivi Province.
