= Siku (Bolivia) =

Mountain in Bolivia

- Location within Bolivia

Highest point
- Elevation: 4,740 m (15,550 ft)
- Coordinates: 19°57′21″S 66°00′09″W

Geography
- Location: Bolivia, Potosí Department
- Parent range: Andes

Siku (also spelled Siqu) (Aymara siku or siqu a kind of flute, also spelled Sekho, Seko) or Siq'u (Quechua for slidable rope; perforated) are the names of a mountain in the Bolivian Andes which reaches a height of approximately 4,740 m (15,550 ft). It is located in the Potosí Department, Antonio Quijarro Province, Tomave Municipality.
