= Watir Quta =

Lake in Bolivia

- Bater Kkota
- Location within Bolivia Location within South America
- Interactive map of Watir Quta
- Location: Bolivia, La Paz Department, Inquisivi Province
- Coordinates: 16°47′25″S 67°27′30″W

Watir Quta (Aymara watiri darner, someone who darns holes in clothes, quta lake, "darner lake", also spelled Bater Kkota) is a lake in the Andes of Bolivia. It is situated in the La Paz Department, Inquisivi Province, Quime Municipality. The river Chaka Jawira which connects Watir Quta with the lakes south-east of it flows through the lake. Its waters run to the La Paz River.
