= Inka Laqaya =

Mountain in Bolivia

- Location within Bolivia

Highest point
- Elevation: 4,836 m (15,866 ft)
- Coordinates: 17°05′41″S 67°15′48″W

Geography
- Location: Bolivia; La Paz Department, Inquisivi Province, Loayza Province
- Parent range: Andes

Inka Laqaya (Aymara Inka Inca, laqaya ruins of a building, "Inca ruin", Hispanicized spelling Inca Lacaya) is a 4,836-metre-high (15,866 ft) mountain in the Bolivian Andes. It lies in the La Paz Department, Inquisivi Province, in the north of the Ichoca Municipality. Inka Laqaya is situated at the river Millu Juqhu which originates near the mountain. It flows to the south-east.
