= Uta Qullu =

Mountain in Bolivia

- Location within Bolivia

Highest point
- Elevation: 4,100 m (13,500 ft)
- Coordinates: 19°54′53″S 65°55′39″W

Geography
- Location: Bolivia, Potosí Department
- Parent range: Andes

Uta Qullu (Aymara uta house, qullu mountain, "house mountain", also spelled Uta Kkollu) is a mountain in the Bolivian Andes which reaches a height of approximately 4,100 m (13,500 ft). It is located in the Potosí Department, Antonio Quijarro Province, Porco Municipality. Uta Qullu lies southwest of the village of Qullpa (Kollpa). The Ch'unchul Mayu flows along its western slope.
