= Sirk'i (Potosí) =

Mountain in Bolivia

- Location within Bolivia

Highest point
- Elevation: 5,108 m (16,759 ft)
- Coordinates: 19°39′31″S 66°27′12″W

Geography
- Location: Bolivia, Potosí Department
- Parent range: Andes

Sirk'i (Aymara for wart, also spelled Serkhe, also named Tacaneri or Takañeri) is a 5,108-metre-high (16,759 ft) mountain in the Andes of Bolivia. It is situated in the Potosí Department, Antonio Quijarro Province, Tomave Municipality, about 14 km north of the Jatun Mundo Quri Warani (Nuevo Mundo) volcano. Sirk'i lies southwest of Kunturiri Mayqu and west of Ch'iyar Jaqhi.

== See also ==
- Kuntur Chukuña
