= Lluqu Lluqu =

Mountain in Bolivia

- Location within Bolivia

Highest point
- Elevation: 4,234 m (13,891 ft)
- Coordinates: 19°53′00″S 65°48′24″W

Geography
- Location: Bolivia, Potosí Department
- Parent range: Andes

Lluqu Lluqu (Aymara for heart, also spelled Llokho Llokho) is a 4,234-metre-high (13,891 ft) mountain in the Bolivian Andes. It is located in the Potosí Department, Antonio Quijarro Province, Porco Municipality. Lluqu Lluqu lies between the Topala River and the Jatun Mayu (or Agua Castilla) northwest of Urqu Maki.
