= Kiwuri (Potosí) =

Mountain in Bolivia

- Location within Bolivia

Highest point
- Elevation: 4,284 m (14,055 ft)
- Coordinates: 19°53′05″S 65°55′21″W

Geography
- Location: Bolivia, Potosí Department
- Parent range: Andes

Kiwuri (Aymara kiwu canine tooth or tusk, -ri a suffix, also spelled Quibure) is a 4,284-metre-high (14,055 ft) mountain in the Bolivian Andes. It is located in the Potosí Department, Antonio Quijarro Province, Porco Municipality, northwest of the village of Qullpa (Kollpa). The Ch'unchull Mayu originates near the mountain. It flows along its western slope.
