= Janq'u Qullu (Potosí) =

Mountain in Bolivia

- Location within Bolivia

Highest point
- Elevation: 5,120 m (16,800 ft)
- Coordinates: 19°26′04″S 66°26′20″W

Geography
- Location: Bolivia, Potosí Department
- Parent range: Andes

Janq'u Qullu (Aymara janq'u white, qullu mountain, "white mountain", also spelled Jankho Kkollu) is a mountain in the Andes of Bolivia, about 5,120 metres (16,798 ft) high. It is situated in the Potosí Department, Antonio Quijarro Province, in the east of the Uyuni Municipality. Janq'u Qullu lies south of the mountain Warachi Qullu. The river Ch'iyar Juqhu Q'awa (Chiar Jokho Khaua) which later is named Juqhu Jawira (Jokho Jahuiri), Jalsullani and Chiqapa (Chicapa) originates north of the mountain. Its waters flow to Qullpa Jawira in the northeast.
