= Inquisivi =

- Location in Bolivia
- Coordinates: 16°54′26″S 67°08′16″W
- Country: Bolivia
- Department: La Paz Department
- Province: Inquisivi Province
- Municipality: Inquisivi Municipality
- Founded: November 2, 1844

Population (2001)
  - Total: 581
- Time zone: UTC-4 (BOT)
- Website: http://www.inquisivi.com

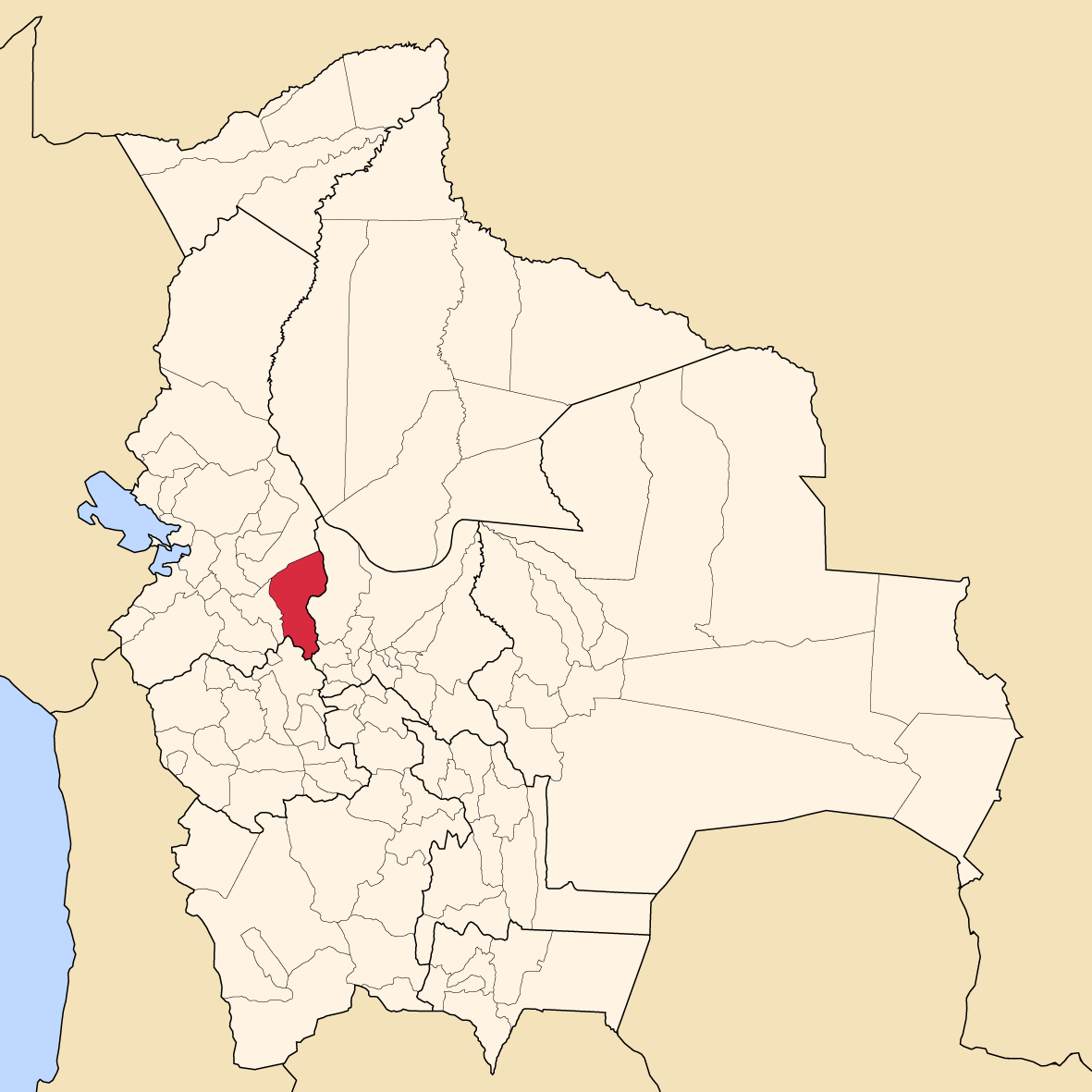
Map of Bolivia, with Inquisivi highlighted in red

Inquisivi is the capital of the Inquisivi Province in the La Paz Department, Bolivia. It was officially named on November 2, 1844. Residents of Inquisivi are called Inquisivenos.

On November 2, 1884, General Narciso Campero officially announced the city as the capital of the new Inquisivi Province.

According to Dr. Edgar Sanders and the treasure hunters who followed his lead, a hoard of Jesuit treasure is located along the Sacambaya River somewhere near Inquisivi.

== Climate ==
Climate data for Chorocona, Inquisivi, elevation 2,240 m (7,350 ft), (1978–2009)
| Month | Jan | Feb | Mar | Apr | May | Jun | Jul | Aug | Sep | Oct | Nov | Dec | Year |
|---|---|---|---|---|---|---|---|---|---|---|---|---|---|
| Mean daily maximum °C (°F) | 24.2 (75.6) | 23.9 (75.0) | 24.1 (75.4) | 23.9 (75.0) | 23.3 (73.9) | 22.4 (72.3) | 22.2 (72.0) | 23.1 (73.6) | 23.6 (74.5) | 25.1 (77.2) | 25.5 (77.9) | 25.4 (77.7) | 23.9 (75.0) |
| Daily mean °C (°F) | 17.8 (64.0) | 17.5 (63.5) | 17.6 (63.7) | 16.9 (62.4) | 15.7 (60.3) | 14.6 (58.3) | 14.4 (57.9) | 15.4 (59.7) | 16.3 (61.3) | 17.5 (63.5) | 18.2 (64.8) | 18.3 (64.9) | 16.7 (62.0) |
| Mean daily minimum °C (°F) | 11.2 (52.2) | 11.0 (51.8) | 10.9 (51.6) | 9.8 (49.6) | 8.0 (46.4) | 6.8 (44.2) | 6.5 (43.7) | 7.7 (45.9) | 9.0 (48.2) | 10.1 (50.2) | 10.9 (51.6) | 11.2 (52.2) | 9.4 (49.0) |
| Average precipitation mm (inches) | 146.5 (5.77) | 118.9 (4.68) | 100.8 (3.97) | 55.3 (2.18) | 24.0 (0.94) | 21.4 (0.84) | 29.8 (1.17) | 48.4 (1.91) | 68.4 (2.69) | 72.6 (2.86) | 77.2 (3.04) | 105.1 (4.14) | 868.4 (34.19) |
| Average precipitation days | 16.6 | 15.0 | 14.1 | 8.8 | 3.4 | 3.4 | 3.5 | 5.7 | 8.3 | 9.4 | 10.7 | 12.4 | 111.3 |
| Average relative humidity (%) | 79.4 | 79.8 | 79.7 | 79.0 | 77.7 | 75.7 | 77.4 | 77.8 | 77.8 | 77.4 | 77.8 | 78.5 | 78.2 |
Source: Servicio Nacional de Meteorología e Hidrología de Bolivia
