= Qina Qina =

Mountain in Bolivia

- Location within Bolivia

Highest point
- Elevation: 4,866 m (15,965 ft)
- Coordinates: 17°00′46″S 67°17′58″W

Geography
- Location: Bolivia; La Paz Department
- Parent range: Andes

Qina Qina (Aymara qina qina an Andean cane flute, also for something full of holes, Hispanicized spelling Quina Quina) is a 4,866-metre-high (15,965 ft) mountain in the Bolivian Andes. It is situated in the La Paz Department, Inquisivi Province, in the south-west of the Quime Municipality. Qina Qina lies east of Wallatani Lake, north-west of the mountain Salla Jithita (Salla Itita).
