= Ch'iyar Jaqhi (Potosí) =

Mountain in Bolivia

- Location within Bolivia

Highest point
- Elevation: 4,906 m (16,096 ft)
- Coordinates: 19°39′40″S 66°24′48″W

Geography
- Location: Bolivia, Potosí Department
- Parent range: Andes

Ch'iyar Jaqhi (Aymara ch'iyara black, jaqhi precipice, cliff, "black cliff", Hispanicized spelling Chiar Jakke) is a 4,906-metre (16,096 ft) mountain in the Andes of Bolivia. It is situated in the Potosí Department, Antonio Quijarro Province, in the north of the Tomave Municipality. Ch'iyar Jaqhi lies south-west of the mountain Kunturiri Mayqu and east of the mountain Sirk'i. The river Ch'iyar Jaqhi originates north of the mountain. It flows to the south-east.
