= Kuntur Samaña =

Mountain in Bolivia

- Location within Bolivia

Highest point
- Elevation: 4,587 m (15,049 ft)
- Coordinates: 17°32′16″S 66°54′44″W

Geography
- Location: Bolivia; La Paz Department, Inquisivi Province
- Parent range: Andes

Kuntur Samaña (Aymara kunturi condor, samaña to rest, 'where the condor rests', also spelled Condor Samaña) is a 4,587-metre-high (15,049 ft) mountain in the Bolivian Andes. It is located in the La Paz Department, Inquisivi Province, Colquiri Municipality. Kuntur Samaña lies at the Qala Uta River, northeast of Jach'a Warmi Qullu.
