= Q'uwa Qullu =

Mountain in Bolivia

- Location within Bolivia

Highest point
- Elevation: 4,425 m (14,518 ft)
- Coordinates: 17°35′40″S 66°59′46″W

Geography
- Location: Bolivia; La Paz Department, Inquisivi Province
- Parent range: Andes

Q'uwa Qullu (Aymara q'uwa a medical plant, qullu mountain, "q'uwa mountain", also spelled Coa Kkollu) is a 4,425-metre-high (14,518 ft) mountain in the Bolivian Andes. It is located in the La Paz Department, Inquisivi Province, in the southern parts of the Colquiri Municipality. Q'uwa Qullu lies northwest of Ch'iyar Jaqhi.
