= Ichoca Municipality =

Coordinates: 17.1667°S 67.1667°W

- Municipality
- Interactive map of Ichoca Municipality
- Country: Bolivia
- Department: La Paz Department
- Province: Inquisivi Province
- Seat: Ichoca
- Time zone: UTC-4 (BOT)

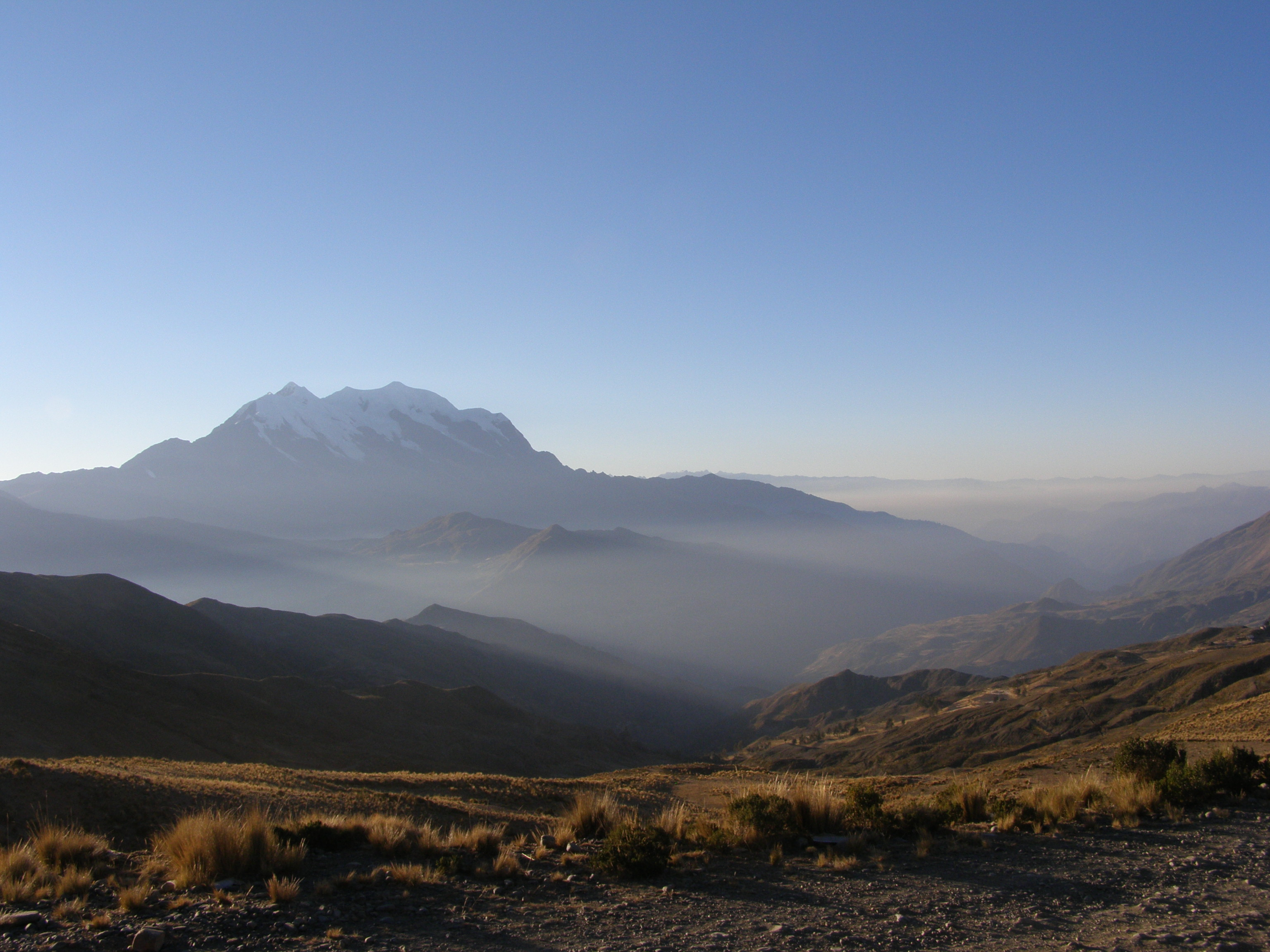

Ichoca Municipality is the fifth municipal section of the Inquisivi Province in the La Paz Department, Bolivia. Its seat is Ichoca.

== See also ==
- Inka Laqaya
- Jach'a Jawira
- Waña Quta
- Wisk'achani
