= Nuevo Mundo volcano =

Stratovolcano in Bolivia

Nuevo Mundo
- Jatun Mundo Quri Warani
- Location within Bolivia

Highest point
- Elevation: 5,438 m (17,841 ft)
- Prominence: 738 m (2,421 ft)
- Coordinates: 19°46′27″S 66°28′42″W

Geography
- Location: Bolivia
- Parent range: Cordillera Oriental

Geology
- Rock age: Holocene
- Mountain type: Stratovolcano
- Last eruption: Unknown

Nuevo Mundo also known as Jatun Mundo Quri Warani (Hispanicized spellings Jatun Mundo Khori Huarani, Jatun Mundo Khorihuarani), is a stratovolcano, lava dome and a lava flow complex between Potosí and Uyuni, Bolivia, in the Andes rising to a peak at 5,438 m (17,841 ft). It is located in the Potosí Department, Antonio Quijarro Province, Tomave Municipality. It lies northeast of the peaks of Uyuni, Kuntur Chukuña and Chuqi Warani and south of Sirk'i.

== Name ==
The term "Jatun Mundo Quri Warani" contains Quechua and/or Aymara words (jatun "big", quri "gold", warani "the one with a scepter" or "constellation"). Mundo (Spanish for "world") is possibly a Hispanicized or a broken word of native origin. As it is an unusually long name it may erroneously be composed of two alternate names, either Jatun Mundo or Quri Warani, as occurred with Pacha Qullu (or Kimsa Misa) which is also sometimes regarded as Pacha Kkollu Quimsa Misa.

In 1995, the Bolivian government used the term "Jatun Mundo Quri Warani" to denominate this mountain and not "Nuevo Mundo". Formerly the maps of the Bolivian Instituto Geográfico Militar (IGM) identified another peak as Nuevo Mundo at 21°56′11″S 66°55′09″W southwest of the Lípez volcano (5,933 m (19,465 ft)) which reaches a height of approximately 5,500 m (18,000 ft). This was based on an earlier identification of Nuevo Mundo as one of the twin peaks of Cerro Lipez.

== History ==
The first mountaineering in the area was before 1903, by a Frenchman, Georges Courty, whose notes on a mountain he called "Nuevo Mundo" led to the mysterious entry in the 1987 book Mountaineering in the Andes by Jill Neate, "Nuevo Mundo, 6020 m, location uncertain."

The German geologist Frederic Ahlfeld, an avid mountaineer, moved to Bolivia in 1924. He began exploring the mountains in Potosí Department after World War II, climbing a number of the peaks. In a letter to the historian and mountaineer Evelio Echevarría in 1962, Ahlfeld stated that because of the supposed height of Nuevo Mundo one of the two Lípez peaks might be a possible candidate for Monsieur Courty's mysterious mountain. However, in 1969, in Ahlfeld's book Geografia Fisica de Bolivia, Ahlfeld presented a drawing of a Nuevo Mundo (5438 m.) with its description, and at a location southwest of Potosí and just north of the small village of Potoco, far away from Cerro Lípez – as he previously had supposed.

There had been doubts that Ahlfeld's Nuevo Mundo lay in the Lípez area because it did not seem to be congruent to his descriptions according to which the mountain that he had visited was southwest of Potosí and immediately north of a village named Potoco.

At the end of the 1990s, Toto Aramayo, Yossi Brain and Dakin Cook undertook the search for Ahlfeld's Nuevo Mundo, and they confirmed it at Latitude:19°47'0"S, Longitude: 66°29'0"W, i.e. Jatun Mundo Quri Warani. The Bolivian government and the USGS now recognize this as the correct identification of Nuevo Mundo.

Some maps still as of 2013 labeled the Lípez volcano (Cerro Lípez) as Nuevo Mundo.

== Geology ==
The Nuevo Mundo volcanic field is a complex eruption center on the edge of the Los Frailes Plateau with a stratovolcano which is capped by cinder cones (mostly of ash and pumice). At the base level there are two lava flows (of a viscous dacite) that erupted along a north–south fault. Apparently at the same time there were block-and-ash flows to the east. Later a highly explosive Plinian eruption produced an ash fall that extended over 200 km to the east, as far as Potosí. This eruption was quite recent, the most recent on the plateau, but it predated the arrival of the Spanish in 1533. While earlier eruption centers, such as the Khari Khari caldera, Wila Qullu, Kuntur Nasa, Villacolo, Cerro Wanapa Pampa created the Los Frailes Plateau, Nuevo Mundo overlaid those Los Frailes plateau deposits in the Holocene with huge ignimbrite deposits, which are mostly pyroclastic dacite and andesite.

Surface exposure dating has yielded ages of 11,700 years for the northern dome. This took place about 3,000 years after the disappearance of a local ice cap, and it is possible that the demise of the ice cap unloaded an underlying magma chamber and thus triggered eruptive activity. Lava coulees erupted from Nuevo Mundo lay above moraines. The last eruption of Nuevo Mundo may have been observed by inhabitants of the Gran Chaco, leading to myths about a great darkness and the sky falling.

== See also ==
- List of volcanoes in Bolivia
