= Waña Quta (La Paz) =

Lake in La Paz Department, Bolivia

- Location within Bolivia Location within South America
- Interactive map of Waña Quta
- Location: Bolivia; La Paz Department, Inquisivi Province, Ichoca Municipality
- Coordinates: 17°03′S 67°15′W
- Max. length: 0.5 km (0.31 mi)
- Max. width: 0.4 km (0.25 mi)
- Surface elevation: 4,761 m (15,620 ft)

Waña Quta (Aymara waña dry, quta lake, "dry lake", hispanicized spelling Huana Kkota) is a lake in Bolivia in the La Paz Department, Inquisivi Province, Ichoca Municipality, Ichoca Canton. It lies south east of the Kimsa Cruz mountain range, the village and the mountain Waña Quta. The lake is about 0.5 km long and 0.4 km at its widest point and situated at a height of about 4,761 metres (15,620 ft).

== See also ==
- Wallatani
