= Jaqi Jiwata =

Mountain in Bolivia

- Location within Bolivia

Highest point
- Elevation: 4,620 m (15,160 ft)
- Coordinates: 17°31′33″S 66°56′21″W

Geography
- Location: Bolivia; La Paz Department, Inquisivi Province
- Parent range: Andes

Jaqi Jiwata (Aymara jaqi man, jiwata dead, "dead man", also spelled Jakke Jihuata) is a mountain in the Bolivian Andes which reaches a height of approximately 4,620 m (15,160 ft). It is located in the La Paz Department, Inquisivi Province, Colquiri Municipality. Jaqi Jiwata lies between Iru Pata in the southwest and Qala Piwrani in the northeast.
