= Tomave Municipality =

Tomave
- Municipality
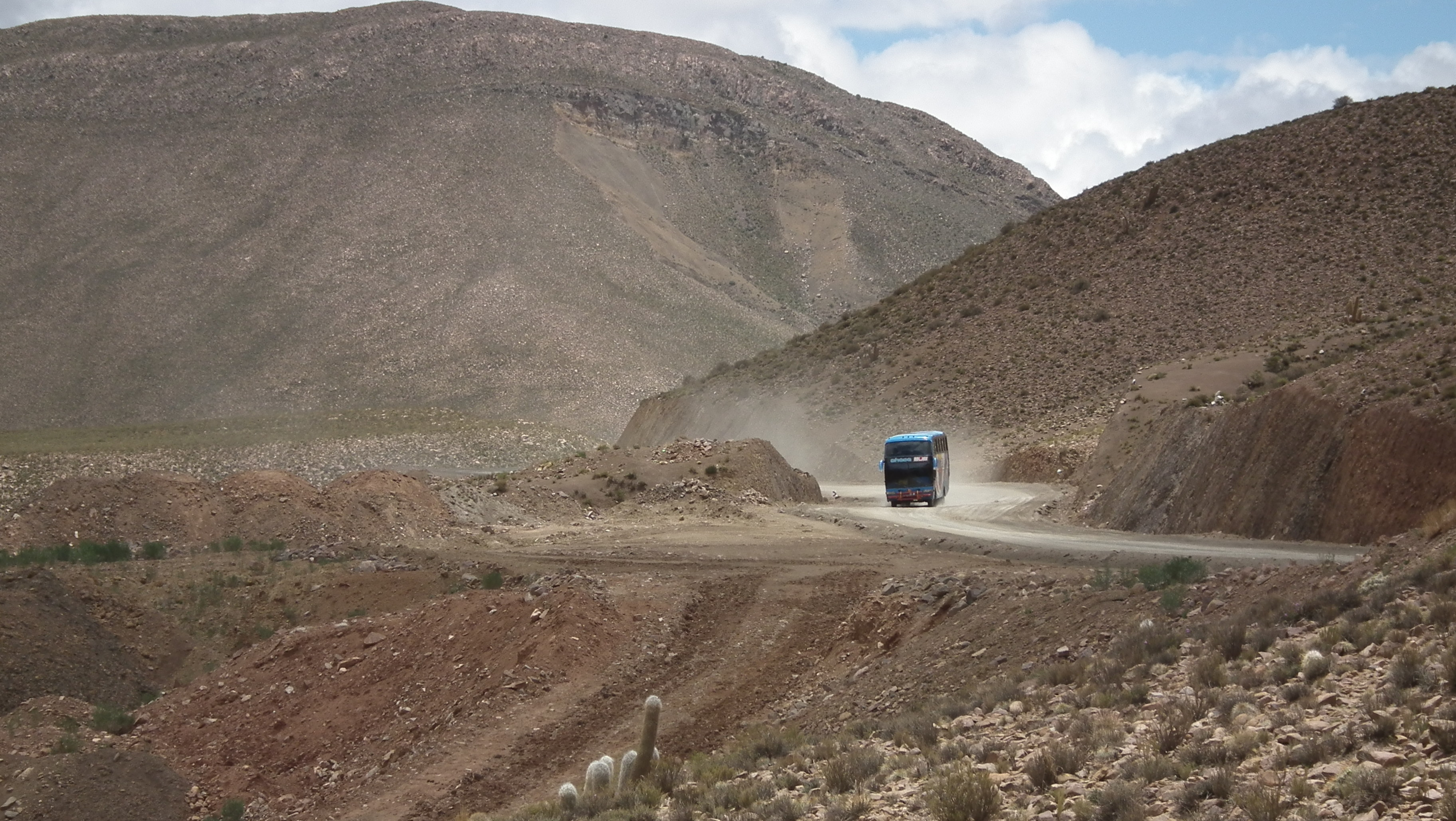
- Route 5 between Potosí and Uyuni in Tomave Municipality

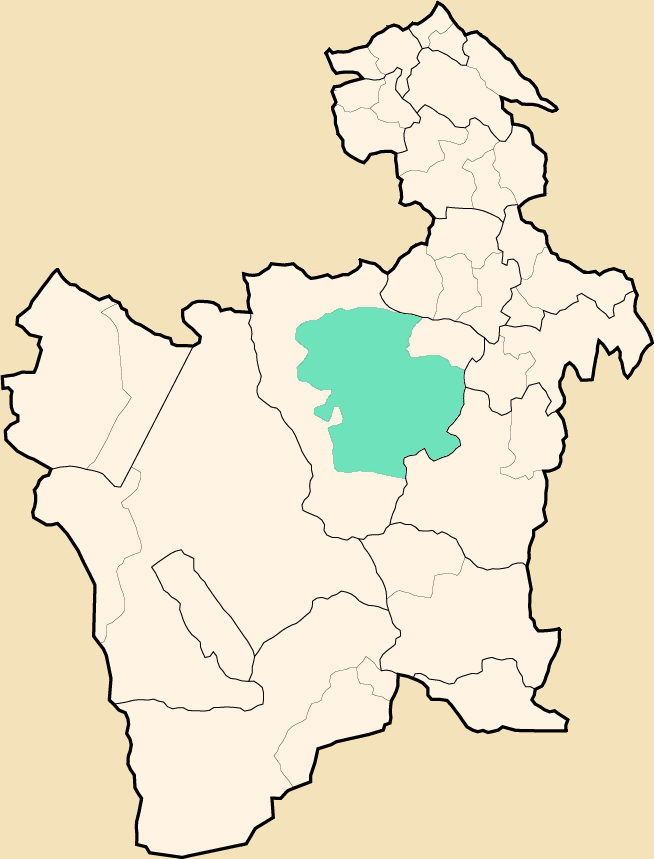
- Location within Potosí Department

- Location within Bolivia
- Coordinates: 20°8′S 66°21′W
- Country: Bolivia
- Department: Potosí Department
- Province: Antonio Quijarro Province
- Seat: Tomave

Population (2001)
  - Total: 12,764
  - Ethnicities: Quechua
- Time zone: UTC-4 (BOT)

Tomave Municipality is the second municipal section of the Antonio Quijarro Province in the Potosí Department in Bolivia. Its seat is Uyuni.

== Geography ==
Some of the highest mountains of the municipality are listed below:

- Chuqi Warani
- Ch'iyar Jaqhi
- Iru Punta
- Jatun Mundo Quri Warani
- Kuntur Chukuña
- Kuntur Umaña
- Maman Chata
- Miyuyuq
- Paquni
- Paya Qullu
- Qusqu
- Siku
- Sirk'i
- T'uru Muqu
- Uwina
- Uyuni
- Wila Nasa
- Wisk'achani
- Wiyacha

== Subdivision ==
The municipality consists of the following cantons: Apacheta, Calasaya, Cuchagua, Opoco, San Francisco de Tarana, Tacora, Ticatica, Tolapampa, Tomave, Ubina, Viluyo and Yura.

== The people ==
The people are predominantly indigenous citizens of Quechua descent.

| Ethnic group | % |
|---|---|
| Quechua | 93.1 |
| Aymara | 3.2 |
| Guaraní, Chiquitos, Moxos | 0.1 |
| Not indigenous | 3.5 |
| Other indigenous groups | 0.2 |
