= Antonio Quijarro Province =

Antonio Quijarro
- Province
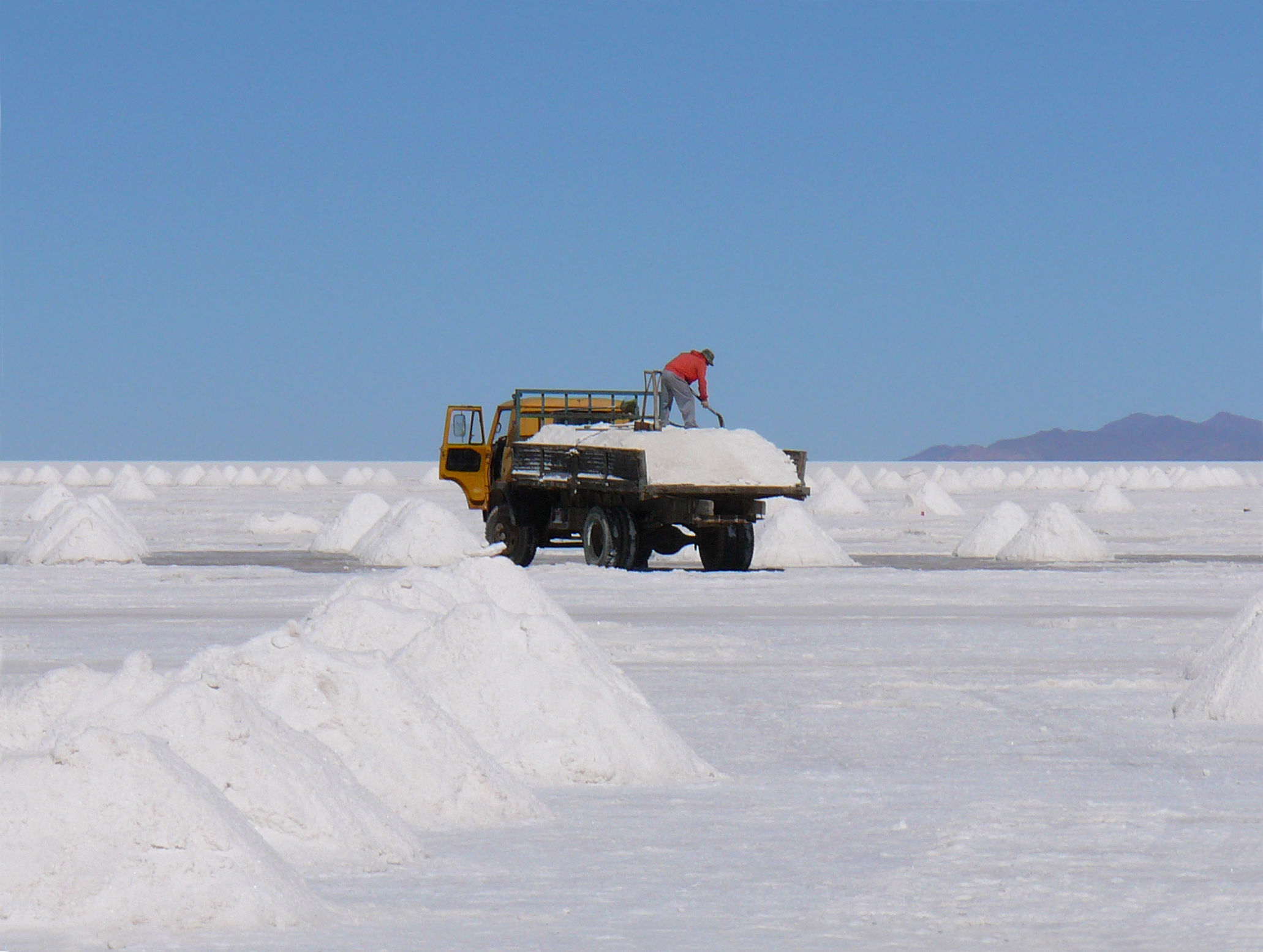
- Salt production on the Salar de Uyuni

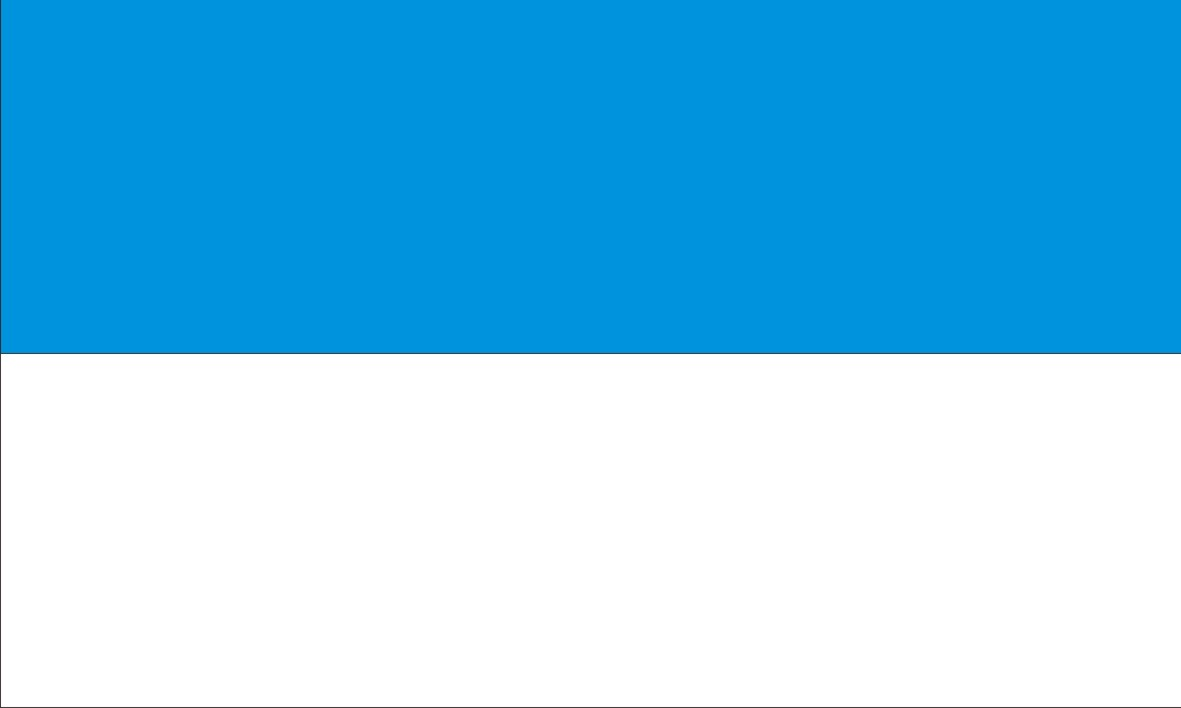
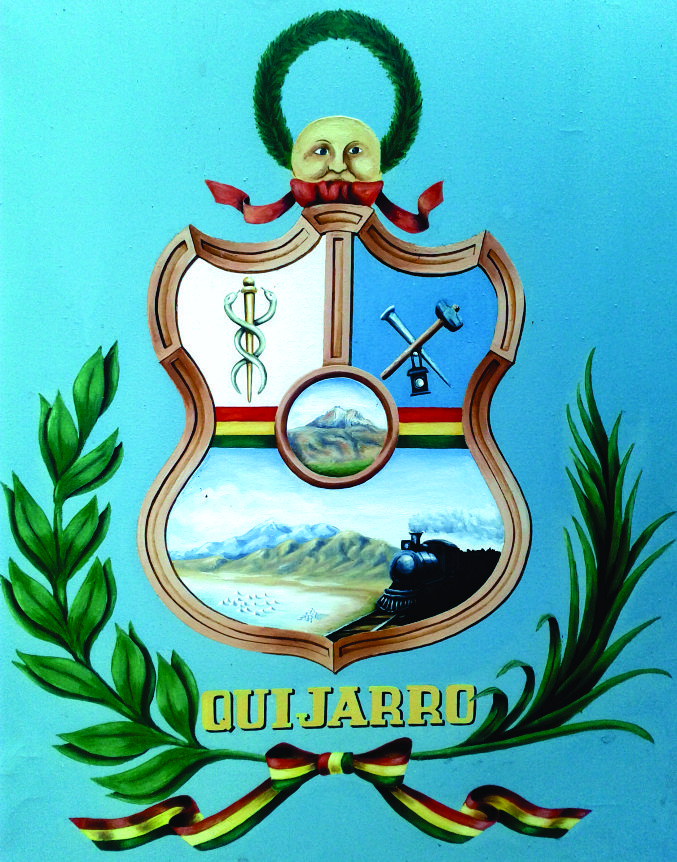
- Flag Seal

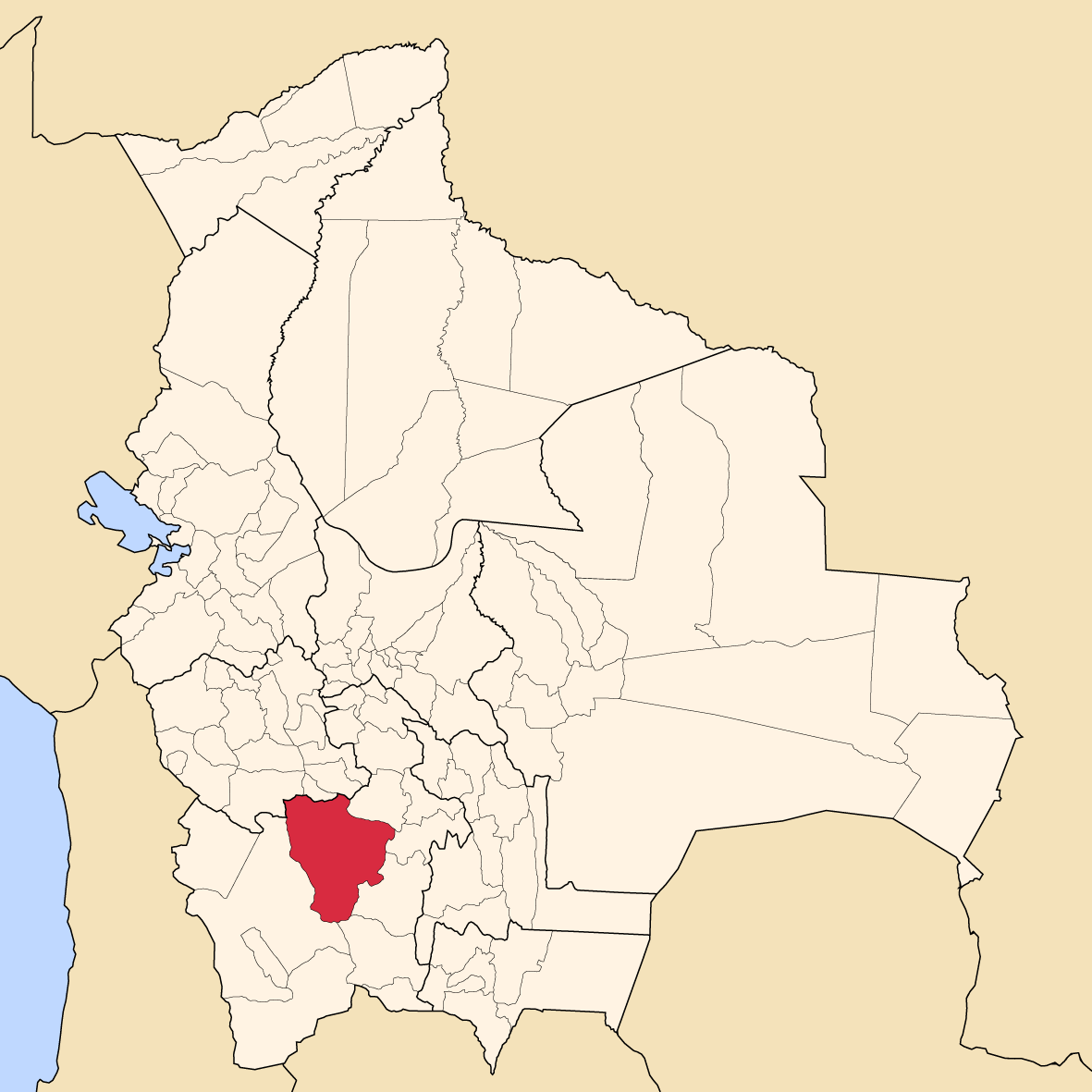
- Location of the Antonio Quijarro Province within Bolivia

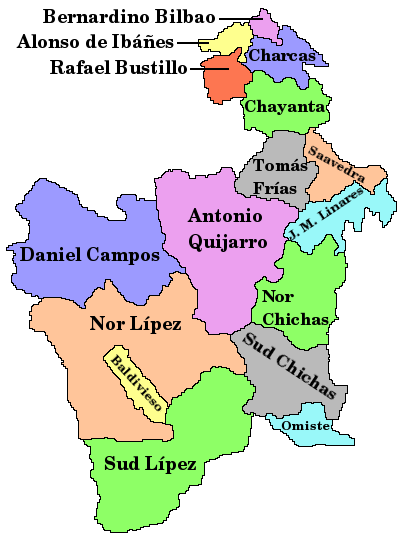
- Provinces of the Potosí Department
- Coordinates: 20°10′0″S 66°30′0″W
- Country: Bolivia
- Department: Potosí Department
- Capital: Uyuni

Area
  - Total: 6,737 sq mi (17,449 km^{2})

Population (2024 census)
  - Total: 63,368
  - Density: 9.4058/sq mi (3.6316/km^{2})
  - Ethnicities: Quechua Aymara
- Time zone: UTC-4 (BOT)
- Area code: BO.PO.AQ

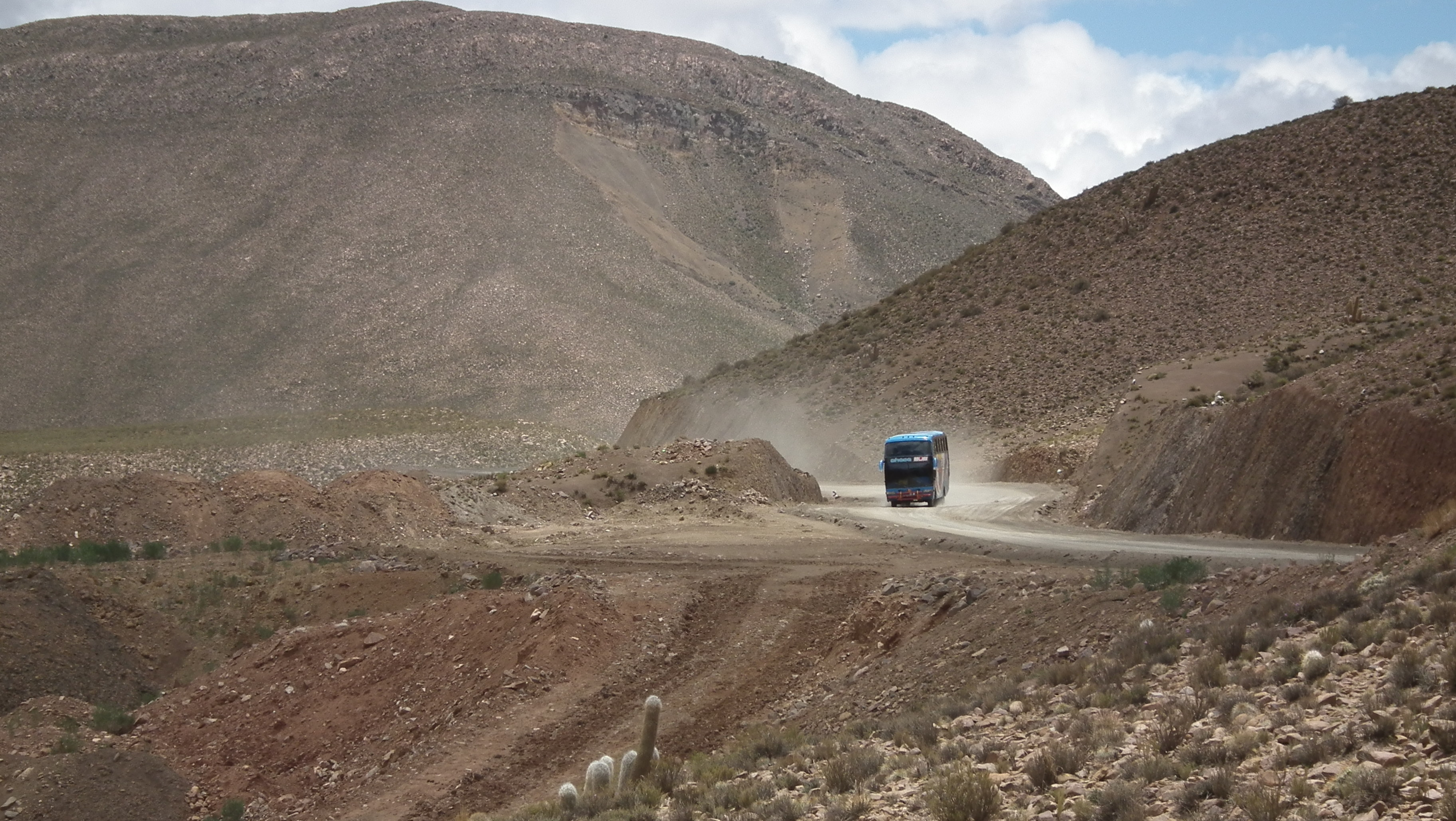
Route 5 between Potosí and Uyuni in Tomave Municipality

Antonio Quijarro is a province in the central parts of the Bolivian Potosí Department situated at the Salar de Uyuni. Its seat is Uyuni.

== Location ==
Antonio Quijarro province is one of sixteen provinces in the Potosí Department. It is located between 19° 21' and 20° 59' South and between 65° 46' and 67° 15' West.

It borders Oruro Department in the north, Nor Lípez Province in the west, Sud Chichas Province in the southeast, Nor Chichas Province and José María Linares Province in the east, and Tomás Frías Province in the northeast.

The province extends over 180 km from east to west and 225 km from north to south.

== Geography ==
The province lies at the Uyuni salt flat.

Some of the highest mountains of the province are listed below:

- Apa Purqu
- Chuqi Warani
- Ch'iyar Jaqhi
- Iru Punta
- Jach'a Punta
- Jalsuri
- Janq'u Qullu
- Jarmiri
- Jatun Mundo Quri Warani
- Kiwuri
- Kuntur Chukuña
- Kuntur Ikiña
- Kuntur Tuqlla
- Kuntur Umaña
- Lluqu Lluqu
- Maman Chata
- Miyuyuq
- Muru Qullu
- Paya Qullu
- Paquni
- Pirwani
- Pukara
- Pukara Punta
- Pukarani
- Phujuni
- Qiwiña Q'asa
- Qullqi Chaka Punta
- Qusqu
- Quyqu
- Siku
- Silla Q'asa
- Sirk'i
- Suchusqa
- Sura Chata
- Sura Sura
- T'uru Muqu
- Uta Qullu
- Uwina
- Uyuni
- Wanay
- Waña Quta
- Warachi Qullu
- Wayna Quta
- Wila Nasa
- Wila Qullu
- Wisk'achani
- Yuraq Qaqa
- Yuraq Q'asa

== Division ==
The province comprises three municipalities which are partly further subdivided into cantons.

Section	Municipality	Seat
1st	Uyuni Municipality	Uyuni
2nd	Tomave Municipality	Tomave
3rd	Porco Municipality	Porco

== Population ==
The main language of the province is Spanish, spoken by 87%, while 74% of the population speak Quechua. The population increased from 37,384 inhabitants (1992 census) to 37,428 (2001 census), an increase of only 0.1%. Capital of the province is Uyuni (10,191 inhabitants).

53% of the population have no access to electricity, 85% have no sanitary facilities. 50% of the population are employed in agriculture, 8% in mining, 5% in industry, 37% in general services. 86% of the population are Catholics, 11% Protestants.

The people are predominantly indigenous citizens of Quechua and Aymara descent.

Ethnic group	Uyuni Municipality (%)	Tomave Municipality (%)	Porco Municipality (%)
Quechua	52.9	93.1	90.1
Aymara	24.2	3.2	1.9
Guaraní, Chiquitos, Moxos	0.2	0.1	0.1
Not indigenous	22.6	3.5	7.7
Other indigenous groups	0.2	0.2	0.1

== See also ==
- Warawara Lake
