= Kuntur Chukuña (Antonio Quijarro) =

Mountain in Bolivia

- Location within Bolivia

Highest point
- Elevation: 5,290 m (17,360 ft)
- Coordinates: 19°55′S 66°31′W

Geography
- Location: Bolivia, Potosí Department, Antonio Quijarro Province, Tomave Municipality
- Parent range: Andes

Kuntur Chukuña (Aymara kunturi condor, chukuña to squat, to cower, 'where the condor squats', also spelled Condor Chucuna, Condor Chucuña) is a mountain in the Andes of Bolivia, about 5,290 m (17,360 ft) high. It is situated in the Potosí Department, Antonio Quijarro Province, Tomave Municipality, between the Uyuni salt flat in the west and the town of Porco in the east and southwest of the Nuevo Mundo volcano (Jatun Mundo Quri Warani).

== See also ==
- Sirk'i
- Mount Uyuni
- List of mountains in the Andes
