= Waña Quta (Potosí) =

Mountain in Bolivia

- Location within Bolivia

Highest point
- Elevation: 4,652 m (15,262 ft)
- Coordinates: 19°53′24″S 65°57′47″W

Geography
- Location: Bolivia, Potosí Department
- Parent range: Andes

Waña Quta (Aymara waña dry, quta lake, "dry lake", also spelled Huayña Khota) is a 4,652-metre-high (15,262 ft) mountain in the Bolivian Andes. It is located in the Potosí Department, Antonio Quijarro Province, Porco Municipality. It lies northeast of the village of Qhilla Qhilla (Kella Kella, Khella Khella).
