= Colquiri Municipality =

Coordinates: 17.4167°S 67°W

Colquiri Qullqiri
- Municipality
- Interactive map of Colquiri
- Country: Bolivia
- Department: La Paz Department
- Province: Inquisivi Province
- Seat: Colquiri
- Time zone: UTC-4 (BOT)

Colquiri Municipality is the fourth municipal section of the Inquisivi Province in the La Paz Department, Bolivia. Its seat is Colquiri.

== Geography ==
Some of the highest mountains of the municipality are listed below:

- Apachita
- Chachakumanni
- Chunkara
- Ch'iyar Jaqhi
- Iru Pata
- Jach'a Warmi Qullu
- Jaqi Jiwata
- Juqhuri
- Kimsa Llallawa
- Kimsa Q'awa
- Kuntur Samaña
- Muru Qullu
- Pichaqani
- Pirwachani
- Pukara
- Pukara Qullu
- Qala Piwrani
- Qullqi Pata
- Q'uwa Qullu
- Tani Tanini
- Tanka Tankani
- Turi Jaqhi
- T'ula T'ulani
- Wankarani
- Wari Ikiña
- Warmi Qullu
- Wila Qullu
- Wisk'acha Punta
