= Licoma Pampa Municipality =

Coordinates: 16.75°S 67.1667°W

- Municipality
- Interactive map of Licoma Pampa Municipality
- Country: Bolivia
- Department: La Paz Department
- Province: Inquisivi Province
- Seat: Licoma
- Time zone: UTC-4 (BOT)

Licoma Pampa Municipality is the sixth municipal section of the Inquisivi Province in the La Paz Department, Bolivia. Its seat is Licoma.
