= K'uyka =

Mountain in Bolivia

- Location within Bolivia

Highest point
- Elevation: 4,828 m (15,840 ft)
- Coordinates: 19°51′05″S 65°57′58″W

Geography
- Location: Bolivia, Potosí Department
- Parent range: Andes

K'uyka (Quechua for earthworm, "dry lake", also spelled Kuillca) is a 4,828-metre-high (15,840 ft) mountain in the Bolivian Andes. It is located in the Potosí Department, Antonio Quijarro Province, Porco Municipality. It lies southwest of Yasamana and west of Ch'illa Q'awa and Anta Anta.
