= Warachi Qullu =

Mountain in Bolivia

- Location within Bolivia

Highest point
- Elevation: 5,029 m (16,499 ft)
- Coordinates: 19°22′48″S 66°26′12″W

Geography
- Location: Bolivia, Potosí Department
- Parent range: Andes

Warachi Qullu (Aymara qullu mountain, also spelled Huarachi Kkollu) is a 5,029-metre-high (16,499 ft) mountain in the Andes of Bolivia. It is situated in the Potosí Department, Antonio Quijarro Province, in the north-east of the Uyuni Municipality. Warachi Qullu lies at the river Ch'iyar Juqhu Q'awa (Chiar Jokho Khaua) which later is named Juqhu Jawira (Jokho Jahuiri), Jalsullani and Chiqapa (Chicapa). Its waters flow to Qullpa Jawira in the north-east.
