= Cajuata Municipality =

Coordinates: 16.5833°S 67.25°W

- Municipality
- Flag
- Interactive map of Cajuata Municipality
- Country: Bolivia
- Department: La Paz Department
- Province: Inquisivi Province
- Seat: Cajuata
- Time zone: UTC-4 (BOT)

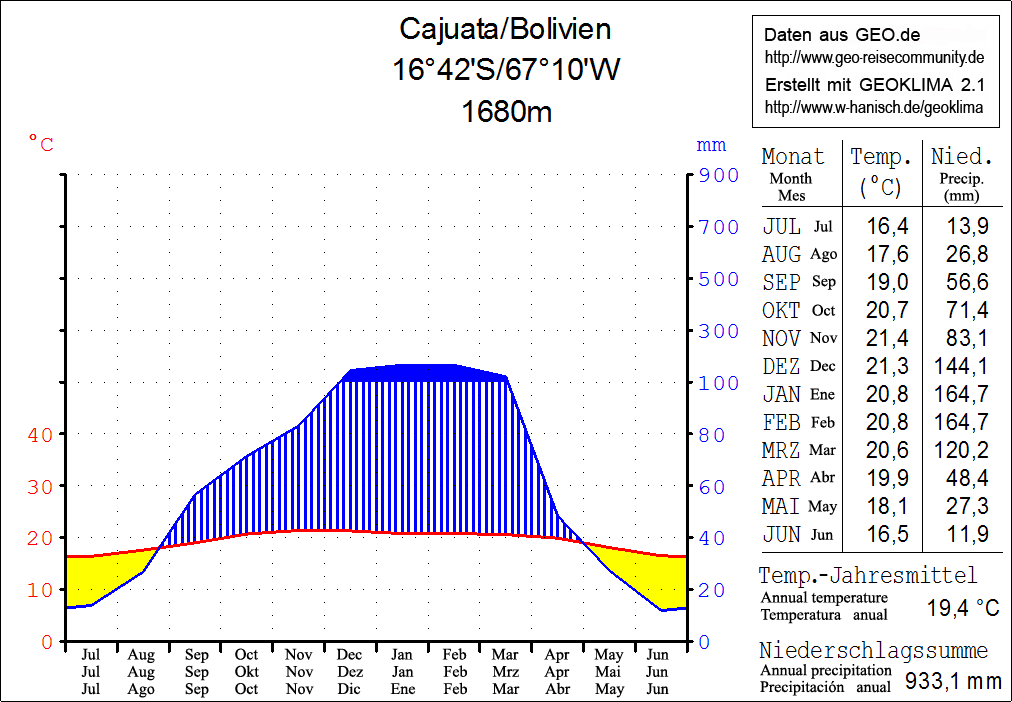
Cajuata Climate graph (Weather by Month)

Cajuata Municipality is the third municipal section of the Inquisivi Province in the La Paz Department, Bolivia. Its headquarters is in Cajuata.

Cajuata Municipality has been identified as a localized new focus of high incidence of cutaneous leishmaniasis in the Sub-Andean region of La Paz.
