= Wisk'achani (Inquisivi-Loayza) =

Mountain in Bolivia

- Location within Bolivia

Highest point
- Elevation: 4,674 m (15,335 ft)
- Coordinates: 17°09′07″S 67°18′41″W

Geography
- Location: Bolivia; La Paz Department, Inquisivi Province, Loayza Province
- Parent range: Andes

Wisk'achani (Aymara wisk'acha a rodent, -ni a suffix to indicate ownership, "the one with the viscacha", Hispanicized spelling Viscachani) is a 4,674-metre-high (15,335 ft) mountain in the Bolivian Andes. It is located in the La Paz Department, Inquisivi Province, Ichoca Municipality, and in the Loayza Province, Yaco Municipality. Wisk'achani is situated south-east of Caxata.
