= Inquisivi Province =

Inquisivi
- Province
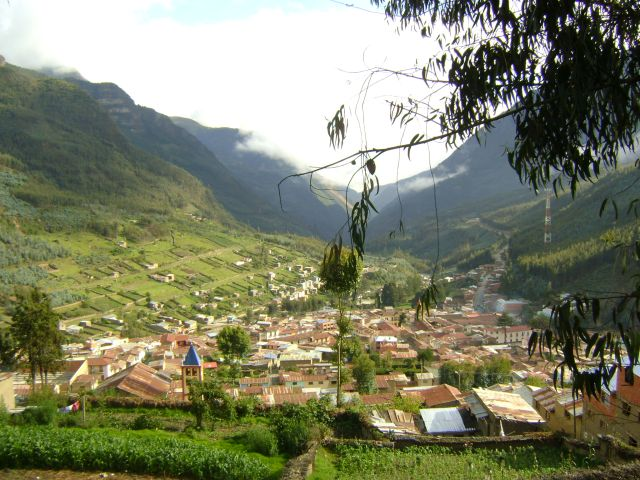
- Quime, a village in the province

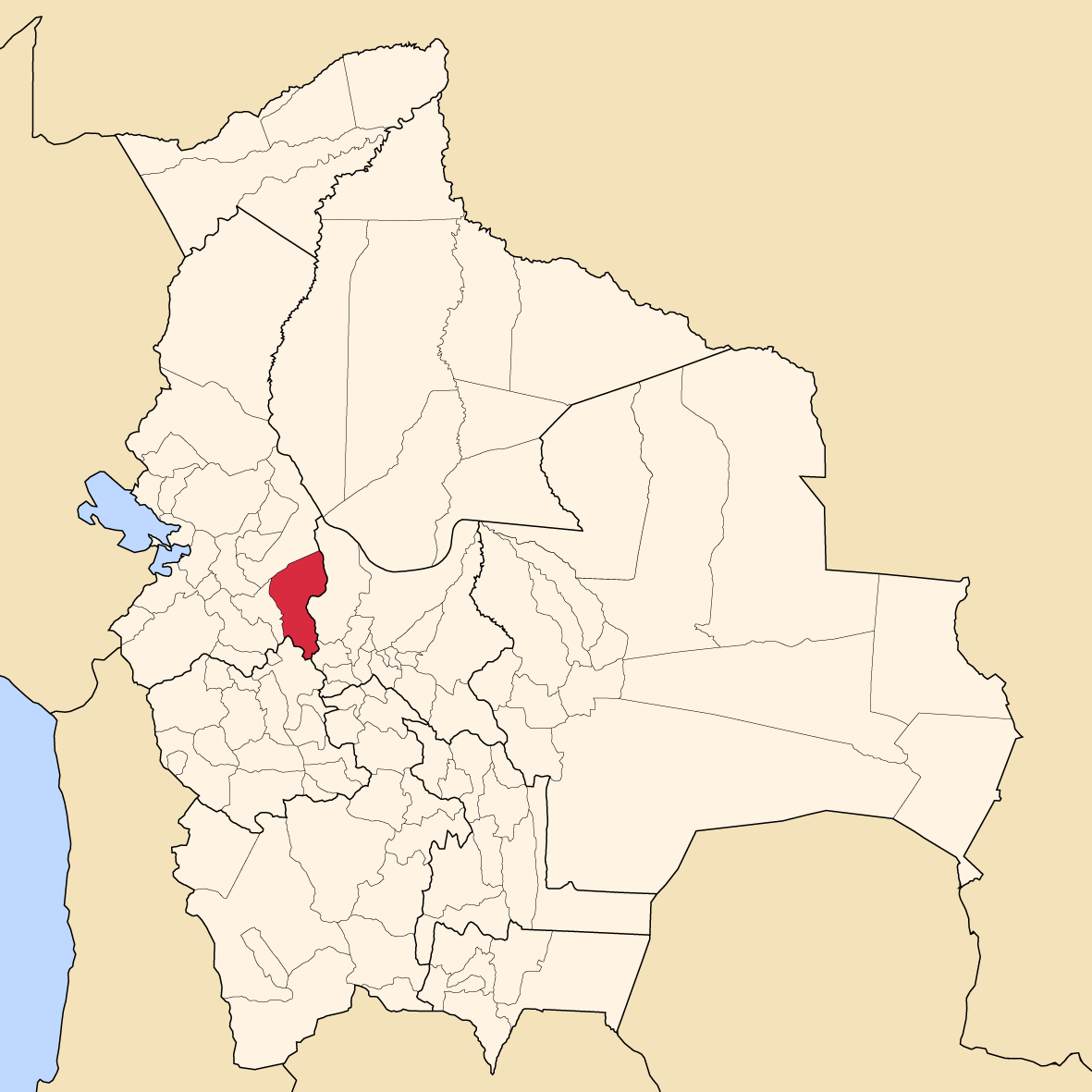
- Map of Bolivia highlighting the province of Inquisivi within the La Paz Department.

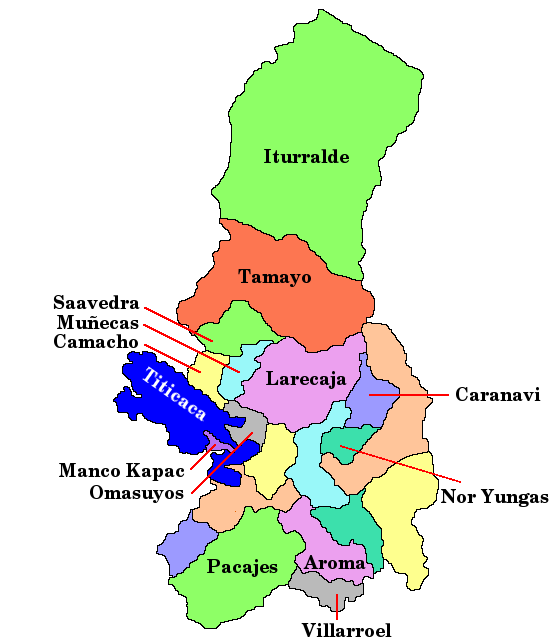
- Provinces of the La Paz Department
- Coordinates: 16°50′S 67°10′W
- Country: Bolivia
- Department: La Paz
- Municipalities: 6
- Founded: November 2, 1844
- Capital: Inquisivi

Area
  - Total: 6,430 km^{2} (2,480 sq mi)

Population (2024 census)
  - Total: 86,216
  - Density: 13.4/km^{2} (34.7/sq mi)
  - Ethnicities: Aymara Quechua
- Time zone: UTC-4 (BOT)
- Website: Official website

Inquisivi is a province in the La Paz Department in Bolivia. During the presidency of José Ballivián it was created on November 2, 1844. The capital of the province is Inquisivi.

== Geography ==
The Kimsa Cruz mountain range traverses the province. Some of the highest mountains of the province are listed below:

- Apachita
- Chachakumani
- Chunkara
- Ch'amak Qullu
- Ch'iyar Jaqhi
- Inka Laqaya
- Iru Pata
- Iskayuni
- Jach'a Pukara
- Jach'a Warmi Qullu
- Jaqi Jiwata
- Janq'u Qullu
- Janq'u Quta
- Juqhuri
- Kimsa Llallawa
- Kimsa Q'awa
- Kimsa Willk'i
- Kuntur Samaña
- León Jiwata
- Pichaqani
- Pirwachani
- Pukara
- Pukara Qullu
- Qala Piwrani
- Qina Qina
- Qullqi Pata
- Q'uwa Qullu
- Tanka Tankani
- Turi Jaqhi
- Turini
- T'ula T'ulani
- Wankarani
- Wari Ikiña
- Warmi Qullu
- Wila Qullu
- Wisk'acha Punta
- Wisk'achani

== Subdivision ==
Inquisivi Province is divided into six municipalities which are further subdivided into cantons.

Municipality	Inhabitants (2001)	Seat	Inhabitants (2001)
Inquisivi Municipality	16,143	Inquisivi	581
Quime Municipality	7,338	Quime	2,439
Cajuata Municipality	7,757	Cajuata	875
Colquiri Municipality	18,351	Colquiri	4,004
Ichoca Municipality	6,839	Ichoca	517
Licoma Pampa Municipality	2,739	Licoma	1,036

== See also ==
- Jach'a Jawira
- Laram Quta
- Wallatani Lake
- Watir Quta
- Waña Quta
