= Wisk'achani (Loayza) =

Mountain in Bolivia

- Location within Bolivia

Highest point
- Elevation: 5,018 m (16,463 ft)
- Coordinates: 17°02′23″S 67°20′28″W

Geography
- Location: Bolivia; La Paz Department, Loayza Province
- Parent range: Andes

Wisk'achani (Aymara wisk'acha a rodent, -ni a suffix to indicate ownership, "the one with the viscacha", Hispanicized spelling Viscachani) is a 5,018-metre-high (16,463 ft) mountain in the Bolivian Andes. It is located in the La Paz Department, Loayza Province, Malla Municipality, at the border with the Inquisivi Province, Quime Municipality. Wisk'achani is situated south-east of the mountain Wallatani of the Kimsa Crus mountain range and Wallatani Lake. The lakes Muyu Quta (Muyu Khota) and Wiska Quta (Wisca Khota) lie at its feet, south-east of it.
