= Warawara Lake (Potosí) =

Lake in Bolivia

Warawara
- Location within Bolivia Location within South America
- Interactive map of Warawara
- Location: Bolivia; Potosí Department, Antonio Quijarro Province
- Coordinates: 19°43′15″S 66°01′45″W
- Max. length: 0.77 km (0.48 mi)
- Max. width: 0.65 km (0.40 mi)
- Surface elevation: 4,400 m (14,400 ft)

Warawara (Aymara warawara star, hispanicized spellings Huara Huara, Huarahuara), often spelled Wara Wara, is a small lake in Bolivia in the Potosí Department, Antonio Quijarro Province, Porco Municipality, Kunturiri Canton. Warawara lies between Wilanta Qullu in the northwest and Porco in the southeast at a height of approximately 4,400 m (14,400 ft). It is 0.77 km long and 0.65 km at its widest point.
