= Iru Pata =

Mountain in Bolivia

- Location within Bolivia

Highest point
- Elevation: 4,494 m (14,744 ft)
- Coordinates: 17°31′47″S 66°56′56″W

Geography
- Location: Bolivia; La Paz Department, Inquisivi Province
- Parent range: Andes

Iru Pata (Aymara iru spiny Peruvian feather grass, pata stone bench, step, "Peruvian feather grass step") is a 4,494-metre-high (14,744 ft) mountain in the Bolivian Andes. It is located in the La Paz Department, Inquisivi Province, Colquiri Municipality. Iru Pata lies southwest of Jaqi Jiwata.
