= Colquiri =

Colquiri Qullqiri
- Town
- Location within Bolivia
- Coordinates: 17°24′S 67°08′W
- Country: Bolivia
- Department: La Paz Department
- Province: Inquisivi Province
- Municipality: Colquiri Municipality
- Elevation: 4,352 m (14,278 ft)

Population (2024)
  - Total: 6,610
- Time zone: UTC-4 (BOT)

Colquiri is a town in the La Paz Department in Bolivia. It is the seat of the Colquiri Municipality, the fourth municipal section of the Inquisivi Province.

== History ==
In 2016, after an ongoing border dispute with nearby Caracollo, a border peace agreement was signed, on the condition that 15 cattle be returned to Caracollo, and a stolen motorcycle be returned to Colquiri.

== Economy ==
The main economic activity in the region is agriculture, mostly potatoes and fruit orchards. Livestock farming consists of sheep, llamas, alpacas, and native cattle, most of which are sold live.

In the past, Colquiri was a mining town, but production has since declined. The most important metals which are extracted and processed are tin and zinc.
