= Patricia Mancilla =

Bolivian politician (born 1967)

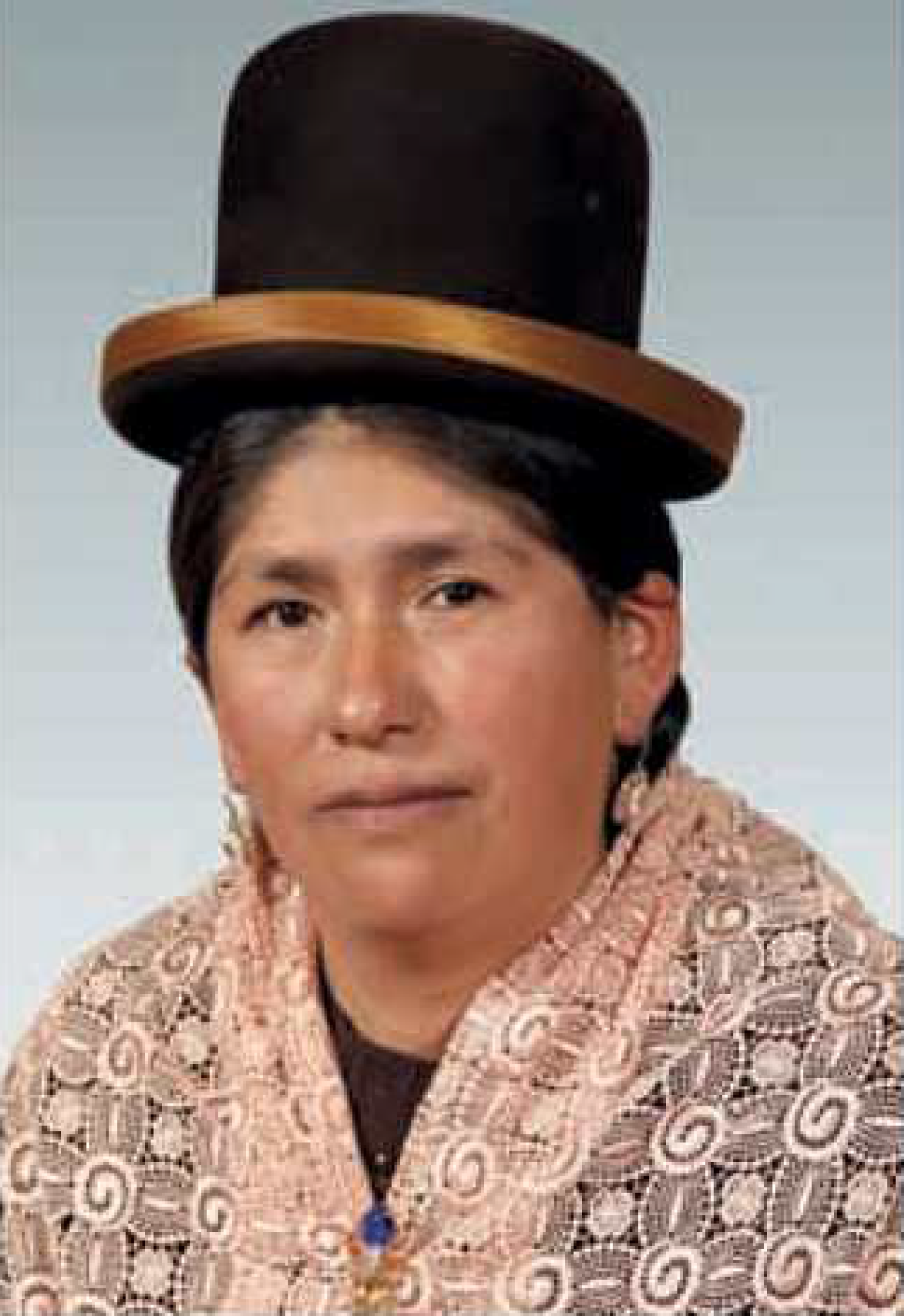
- Official portrait, 2014

Member of the Chamber of Deputies from La Paz
- In office 19 January 2010 – 18 January 2015
- Substitute: Eliseo Suxo
- Preceded by: Enrique Marín
- Succeeded by: Natalia Calle
- Constituency: Party list

Personal details
- Born: Patricia Mancilla Martínez; 9 October 1967 (age 58) Asiento Araca, La Paz, Bolivia
- Party: Movement for Socialism (since 2000)
- Other political affiliations: Conscience of Fatherland (1999–2000)
- Occupation: Politician; trade unionist

Patricia Mancilla Martínez (born 9 October 1967) is a Bolivian politician and trade unionist who served as a party-list member of the Chamber of Deputies from La Paz from 2010 to 2015. A member of the Movement for Socialism, she previously served on the Cairoma Municipal Council from 2000 to 2005.

Mancilla was raised in Asiento Araca in the agricultural Araca Valley. She worked as a promotora and delivered catechesis on Catholic theology. In tandem, Mancilla played an active role in regional trade unionism, holding positions within the Bartolina Sisa Confederation of peasant women throughout the 1990s.

Elected to the Cairoma Municipal Council as a member of Conscience of Fatherland in 1999, Mancilla quickly defected to the Movement for Socialism and held positions within the party's internal structure. As a member of the Chamber of Deputies, Mancilla launched a court petition seeking the decriminalization of abortion, which failed but did produce some modest outcomes for the abortion-rights movement. She was not nominated for reelection.

== Early life and career ==
=== Early life and education ===
Patricia Mancilla was born on 9 October 1967 in Asiento Araca, a rural settlement in Cairoma – then part of Luribay – in the Loayza Province of southern La Paz Department. The village lies in the predominantly Aymara-populated Araca Valley, at the junction between three ecoregions: highland Altiplano, subtropical Yungas, and mid-elevation Valle. The temperate climate makes the area prime for agricultural production, especially potato cultivation; families like Mancilla's lived and worked as campesinos, producing such crops for market consumption and mild subsistence.

Mancilla attended the Germán Busch School in Cairoma, where she completed primary and secondary and received her baccalaureate. The eldest among six siblings, familial duties prevented her from pursuing higher education, only attending preparatory courses in linguistics at the Higher University of San Andrés. Later, Mancilla participated in popular communication programs at the Bolivian Catholic University and received a diploma in municipal administration.

=== Career and trade unionism ===
Mancilla settled in the city of La Paz as a young adult but retained close ties to her home community – as is customary among many rural-urban migrants. In Cairoma, she worked as a promotora, providing basic women's health and vocational education. Mancilla also served as a catechist of the Catholic Church, a position that – beyond the religious element – played an elevated public role in rural areas, fomenting the presence and leadership of women in agrarian communities.

From the mid-1990s, Mancilla scaled positions within the peasant labor movement as part of the region's agrarian and women's unions. She held membership in the workers' sub-center of Cairoma in 1994 and joined the municipality's agrarian workers' center the following year. From 1996 to 1997, she served as provincial executive of the Bartolina Sisa Confederation in Loayza Province and was secretary of relations of its departmental affiliate from 2007 to 2008.

== Chamber of Deputies ==
=== Election ===
Mancilla first forayed into politics as a member of Conscience of Fatherland (CONDEPA) in 1999. The party – already in steep decline when Mancilla joined – faced numerous difficulties, engulfed in disputes between deceased leader Carlos Palenque's principal successors: daughter Verónica Palenque and life partner Remedios Loza. Although Mancilla won a seat on the Cairoma Municipal Council representing CONDEPA in that year's elections, she defected shortly thereafter, as the party's hemorrhaging partisan base was absorbed into the Movement for Socialism (MAS).

Already in 2000, Mancilla joined the MAS, and from 2002 to 2004, she served as regional director of the party in the provinces of La Paz. Mancilla's rise to senior positions within both the MAS and trade union sector resulted in her inclusion on the party's parliamentary slate in the 2009 election. She won a seat representing La Paz in the Chamber of Deputies.

=== Tenure ===
Within the majority MAS caucus, Mancilla composed part of the small delegation of women legislators representing the Bartolina Sisa Confederation – ten in total, with six in the lower chamber. Mancilla served on the Chamber of Deputies' Human Rights Commission for the length of her term, spending two years on the Human Rights Committee before being reassigned to the Gender Rights Committee for the following three.^{[§]}

Backed by the non-governmental organization Ipas, Mancilla launched a petition before the Plurinational Constitutional Tribunal, seeking that a dozen articles covering women's issues in Bolivia's antiquated Penal Code – including those outlawing abortion – be declared unconstitutional under the country's new constitution. The action was taken independently of her party and generated unusual disunity within the MAS: President Evo Morales classified the practice as "a crime" but remained largely neutral on the topic; parliamentary leaders like Emeliana Aiza and Eugenio Rojas expressed outright opposition, while yet more legislators and cabinet members backed the prospect.

The constitutional court issued a ruling on the case in early 2014, upholding most provisions in the penal code while expunging the controversial requirement for judicial authorization before any legal abortion could take place. Abortion-rights advocates accepted the ruling as a moderate success for reproductive rights, with Mancilla expressing support for the court's final judgment.

Mancilla was not nominated for reelection at the end of her term.

=== Commission assignments ===
- Human Rights Commission
  - Human Rights and Equal Opportunities Committee (2010–2012)
  - Gender Rights Committee (2012–2015)

== Electoral history ==
Electoral history of Patricia Mancilla
| Year | Office | Party | Votes | | | Result | Ref. |
| Year | Office | Party | Total | % | P. | Result | Ref. |
|---|---|---|---|---|---|---|---|
| 1999 | Councillor | Conscience of Fatherland | 360 | 16.59% | 3rd | Won | (Note: Presented on an electoral list. The data shown represents the share of the vote the entire party/alliance received in that constituency.) |
| 2009 | Deputy | Movement for Socialism | 1,099,259 | 80.28% | 1st | Won | |
Source: Plurinational Electoral Organ | Electoral Atlas

Chamber of Deputies of Bolivia
| Preceded by Enrique Marín | Member of the Chamber of Deputies from La Paz; 2010–2015 | Succeeded by Natalia Calle |
