= Araca =

Araca can refer to:

- Araca, a town in Bolivia
- Arača, a ruins of a Romanesque monastery in Serbia
- Araca group, a theatrical production company
