= Abortion in Bolivia =

Abortion in Bolivia is illegal, except in the cases of rape, incest, or to protect the woman's health, forming part of the Penal Code laid down in 1973, and has been in force since then. Due to the difficulty of receiving abortions—even if the abortion does fall under one of the exceptions to the law, judicial permission needs to be secured, which can take a very long time—many pregnant women end up having unsafe, clandestine abortions instead. According to the Bolivian Ministry of Health, almost all of the 67,000 abortions performed in Bolivia in 2011 were clandestine, with approximately half of the women who received them needing hospital care afterwards. This practice has been linked to the high maternal mortality rates in the country.

Efforts were made to change the law in 2005, when legislators from the Movement for Socialism introduced a bill to legalise abortion, but it was quickly rejected. In 2013, four years after the introduction of Bolivia's new constitution, Patricia Mancilla began a legal challenge calling for the Plurinational Constitutional Court to declare many provisions of the Penal Code, including the anti-abortion legislation, unconstitutional.

On 6 December 2017, Bolivia's National Assembly voted to decriminalize abortion before eight weeks of pregnancy for "students, adolescents, or girls". Although the legislation does not specify an age limit, it is considered to apply to girls of age 17 or lower. Health Minister Ariana Campero supported this legislation as a measure to reduce the maternal mortality rate, and President Evo Morales signed the reform into law on 15 December 2017. However, the reform law was repealed in its entirety on 27 January 2018 in response to protests about its provisions criminalizing medical malpractice.

== See also ==
- Abortion law
- Reproductive rights in Latin America
