= Ariana Campero =

Bolivian doctor

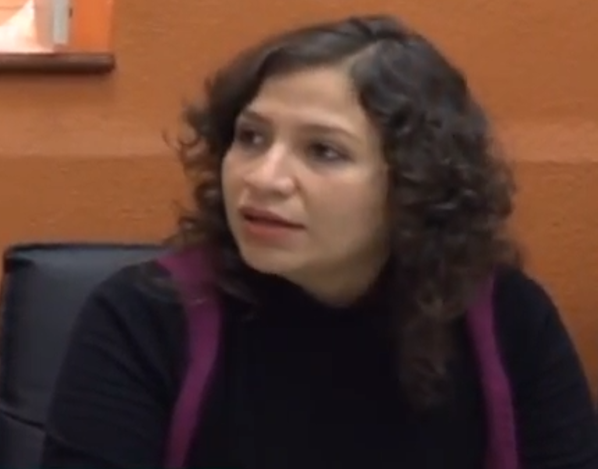

Minister of Heath
- In office 23 January 2015 – 30 May 2018
- President: Evo Morales
- Preceded by: Juan Carlos Calvimontes
- Succeeded by: Rodolfo Rocabado

Personal details
- Born: 21 September 1986 (age 39)
- Party: MAS-IPSP

Ariana Campero Nava (born 21 September 1986) is a Bolivian doctor who was Minister of Health in the Cabinet of Bolivia. At the time of her appointment, at age 28, she was the youngest minister in the cabinet.

== Biography ==
Ariana Campero was born in the city of Cochabamba on 21 September 1986, where she completed high school. Her university studies were in the field of medicine. She was in one of the first cohorts of Bolivian students to receive scholarships to study in Cuba during the early years of the Evo Morales government. There she studied at the Escuela Latinoamericana de Medicina in Havana, graduating as a doctor. She returned to Bolivia in 2011 and she is trying to bring Cuban Doctors to replace Bolivian doctors.

Campero was assigned to work as a community doctor supporting the Juana Azurduy bonus program for pregnant and post-partum women in Aiquile Municipality, Cochabamba. For ten months she served as an advisor to Health Minister Juan Carlos Calvimontes.

=== Public service ===
On 30 April 2014, Campero was sworn in as Vice Minister of Health, replacing Martín Maturano. She held that office until January 2015, when she was elevated to Minister of Health. She became the youngest minister in Evo Morales' cabinet at just 28 years of age.

As health minister, in October 2015, she launched a program for universal lactation, also known as a pre-natal subsidy program, designed to give healthy food products to all pregnant women beginning in the fourth month of pregnancy.

On 14 October 2015, Campero was designated the president of the Andean Regional Health Organization.

On 6 December 2017, Campero announced her support for legislation to allow abortion in Bolivia for "students, adolescents, or girls", as a measure to reduce the maternal mortality rate.
