= Agriculture in Bolivia =

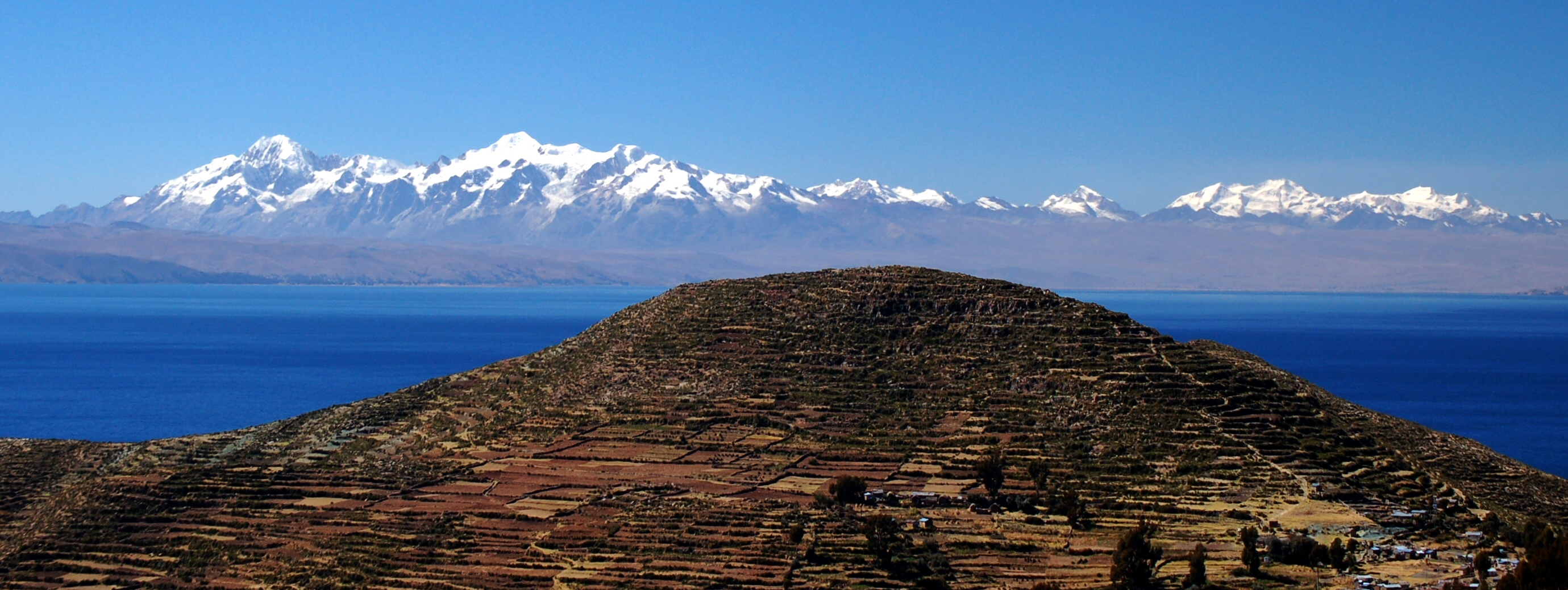
Farmland rising in terraces in central Bolivia.

The role of agriculture in the Bolivian economy in the late 1980s expanded as the collapse of the tin industry forced the country to diversify its productive and export base. Agricultural production as a share of GDP was about 23% in 1987, compared with 30% in 1960 and a low of just under 17% in 1979. The recession of the 1980s, along with unfavorable weather conditions, particularly droughts and floods, hampered output. Agriculture employed about 46% of the country's labor force in 1987. Most production, with the exception of coca, focused on the domestic market and self-sufficiency in food. However, with increased industrial agriculture starting in the early 2000s, exportation of commodities such as quinoa has grown substantially and local consumption has declined. Foreign industries' introduction of new machinery, monoculture, and chemicals (such as pesticides) to Bolivian agriculture has shifted production further away from Indigenous farmers and created a larger dependence on foreign markets. Agricultural exports accounted for only about 15% of total exports in the late 1980s, depending on weather conditions and commodity prices for agricultural goods, hydrocarbons, and minerals.

== Production ==
In 2018, Bolivia produced 9.6 million tons of sugarcane, 2.9 million tons of soy, 1.2 million tons of maize, 1.1 million tons of potato, 1 million tons of sorghum, 700 thousand tons of banana, 541 thousand tons of rice, 301 thousand tons of wheat, in addition to smaller yields of other agricultural products, such as tangerine, cassava, orange, beans, sunflower seed, cotton etc. . Around the 1960s and 70s, Bolivia was producing about 5000 tons of quinoa in an area of 10000 hectares. This increased dramatically leading to a production of about 25000 tons in the early 2000s in an area of 50000 hectares.

== Obstacles ==
Like the economy at large, agriculture faced major structural obstacles that kept it from reaching its vast potential. The lack of roads and easy access to ports hindered farmers from getting their produce to domestic markets and to the export markets that provided the most potential for the sector's growth. A lack of credit for farmers was another long-standing problem, caused by government policies, the use of credit for political ends, and the strict lending procedures of the commercial banking sector. Bolivia also suffered from the worst farming technology in South America and an insufficient network of research and extension institutions to reverse that trend. The combined lack of infrastructure and technology made farmers vulnerable to almost yearly droughts and floods. The traditional use of pricing policies ensuring lower food prices for urban residents also lessened incentives for farmers. In addition, farmers increasingly had to compete with contraband imports in a wide range of agricultural products. Beyond these specific obstacles, agriculture, like all sectors of the economy, also suffered from the country's endemic political instability, economic mismanagement, and slow economic growth.

== Crops ==
=== Potatoes ===
Potatoes have been an important crop and staple of Bolivia grown in the highland region since pre-Inca times. In 1988 approximately 190,000 hectares, mostly in the highlands, produced 700,000 tons of potatoes. These figures compared unfavorably, however, with 1975, when 127,680 hectares provided 834,000 tons of potatoes, indicating that yields were dwindling. Bolivia was generally self-sufficient in potatoes (over 200 varieties were grown), but imports were needed during occasional periods of drought or freezing. Bolivia also exported some of its harvest to Brazil. The lack of new seed varieties, chemical fertilizers, and irrigation systems, together with the continued exhaustion of the highland soils, was responsible for the low yields. In the late 1980s, the lack of financial credit at planting time represented the greatest impediment facing potato growers.

=== Corn ===
Corn was the second major food crop, and its importance was growing. Corn covered more hectares than any other crop. In the late 1980s, approximately 300,000 hectares provided more than 475,000 tons of white corn, the traditional corn of Bolivia. Yellow Cuban corn, grown in the tropical areas of Santa Cruz, was becoming more common; 160,000 hectares produced 350,000 tons of yellow corn in 1988. 60% of the corn, including both white and yellow varieties was grown by small farmers in the valleys, with the remaining 40% planted by medium-large farmers in Santa Cruz. Small farmers used at least half of their corn for human consumption, as animal feed, or for brewing chicha, the primary intoxicating beverage consumed by Bolivian Indians. The other half of their production and most of the commercially farmed corn were sold to Bolivia's forty private animal-feed plants, which bought 50% of the country's annual corn output. Many corn farmers were members of the Corn and Sorghum Producers Association (Productores de Maíz y Sorgo Promasor). Promasor was particularly active in Santa Cruz, where its members also produced 20,000 tons a year of sorghum, a drought-resistant crop, from some 6,000 hectares of land.

=== Rice and grains ===
Rice has become an increasingly popular crop in Bolivia. Eaten by people in the lowlands and valleys since the 1950s, rice became the focus of government import-substitution policies beginning in the 1960s. In the late 1980s, the country was generally self-sufficient in rice production, some years importing and other years exporting. Bolivia's rice, however, was not of high quality by international standards, thus limiting export markets. In 1988 some 90,000 hectares of land, mostly in the Santa Cruz Department and Beni Department, produced 140,000 tons of rice. Bolivia imported one fifth of its total consumption of rice in 1988. Approximately 20,000 small farmers produced the bulk of the country's paddy rice and, in turn, sold it via truckers to thirty private rice mills.

Barley was a common crop in the Bolivian highlands and was particularly well suited for the high altitudes. In 1988 the cultivation of 80,000 hectares by 300,000 highland farmers produced 75,000 tons of barley, which was used primarily in the country's notable beer industry. About 10% of the barley was consumed on the farm as fodder, and Bolivia imported about one-quarter of its total consumption of barley in 1988.

Quinoa, the "mother grain" of the Incas, was the only food crop in the highlands that experienced sustained growth during the 1970s and 1980s. Cultivation of quinoa, which grows only above 2,000 meters, jumped from 15,640 hectares producing 9,000 tons in 1980 to 45,800 hectares producing 21,140 tons in 1984, and production continued to expand in the late 1980s. Quinoa is a popular crop in the Bolivian altiplano because of its drought resistant traits and its ability to grow is colder temperatures. The price of quinoa increased drastically, around 800% from 2005 to 2013, indicating a significant increase in demand during that time. Quinoa is high in fiber and rich in protein, making it a health food in industrialized countries.

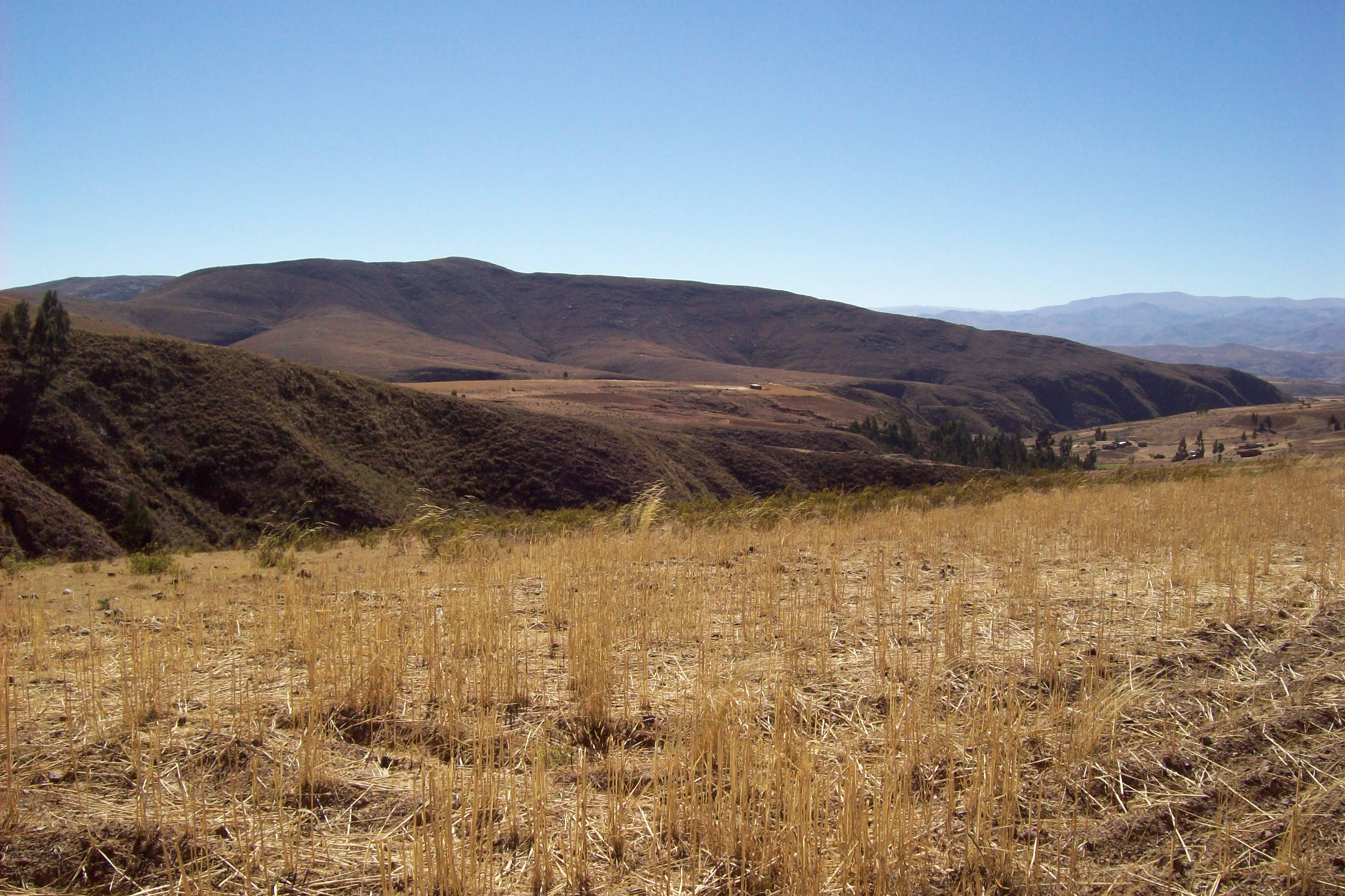
Wheat production in Bolivia.

Despite repeated attempts by the government's National Wheat Institute (Instituto Nacional del Trigo) to make the nation selfsufficient in wheat production, Bolivia produced only about 20% of the wheat that it consumed in the late 1980s. In 1988 about 88,000 hectares produced 60,000 tons of wheat and in the same year, 280,000 tons of wheat were imported. In 1988 the United States Agency for International Development (AID) provided 180,000 tons of wheat through its Public Law 480 (PL-480) Food for Peace Program. Western Europe and Canada operated programs similar to the AID program but on a smaller scale. Argentina provided wheat in exchange for Bolivian natural gas. Smuggled wheat flour from Peru and Argentina represented a serious threat to domestic wheat production. In 1988 analysts estimated that 60,000 tons of smuggled wheat had entered Bolivia annually. Small traditional farmers in the highlands and large soybean farmers in Santa Cruz provided most of the country's 1988 wheat harvest, which was roughly equivalent to output in 1978, but only wheat from the Santa Cruz area was used for commercial milling. Analysts believed that wheat would produce higher yields when the proper tropical seeds, fertilizer, and irrigation methods were used.

Timeline: The perception and cultivation of Quinoa in Bolivia

Traditionally, the Inca civilization living in the Andes perceived quinoa as a valued and sacred grain. The perception of the grain changed when the Spanish colonized the area and brought with them their own, foreign crops. With the addition of new, crops such as barley (not native to Bolivian agriculture) came modifications in traditional farming techniques. Even-still, the land and techniques used by Indigenous population to cultivated quinoa, called “Aynokas,” remained. This kept Indigenous farming techniques alive and, therefore, preserved the biodiversity of the grain.

Over time, in addition to the change in perception, a large portion of Bolivia’s population began to see quinoa as “food for the poor”. This perception started to change in the early 2000s when there was a major increase in consumption and demand for quinoa, mostly in Europe and the West. This surge in demand can largely be attributed to the many health benefits of the grain. Quinoa is rich in proteins, beneficial fatty acids, and vitamins, all of which are fostered by the biodiversity maintained by Indigenous farming techniques. Quinoa is also gluten-free, which is a significant selling point for the growing gluten-intolerant population.

All of these factors led to the quinoa boom in Bolivia starting in 2011, with its peak lasting for four years. This boom signaled a shift in Bolivia from Indigenous, sustainable farming practices to large-scale industrial production, including the new use of pesticides and other chemicals. These new techniques have had major social, economic, and environmental impacts. Not only did large-scale production cause a decline in the diversity of the grain, but it also harmed the fertility of the soil in the southern Altiplano, where quinoa is produced. Industrial farming introduced chemicals and new machinery, such as tractors, which contributed to increasing soil degradation and the decline in natural vegetation. The use of tractors and other machinery has effects like loosening of the soil, causing it to be more susceptible to erosion and lose much of its moisture. Tactics such as the planting of cover crops to protect soil from erosion and the introduction of more grazing animals like llamas to protect soil health will help counteract some of these effects if put in place.

Economically, this new form of production and exportation benefited Bolivia by bringing in more capital. Under President Evo Morales’s economic goals, this capital was to be redistributed to the poor and Indigenous populations. Despite this economic growth from increased production, Bolivia became more reliant on foreign industries, making it more difficult for the country to meet its goal of economic decolonization.

=== Vegetables and fruits ===
Bolivians produced a wide range of vegetables, fruits, and other food crops, mostly for local consumption. The principal vegetable crops included kidney beans, green beans, chick peas, green peas, lettuce, cabbage, tomatoes, carrots, onions, garlic, and chili peppers. Also common were alfalfa, rye, cassava, sweet potatoes and the fruits oranges, limes, grapes, apples, quince, papayas, peaches, plums, cherries, figs, avocadoes, pineapples, strawberries, bananas, and plantains.

=== Cash Crops ===
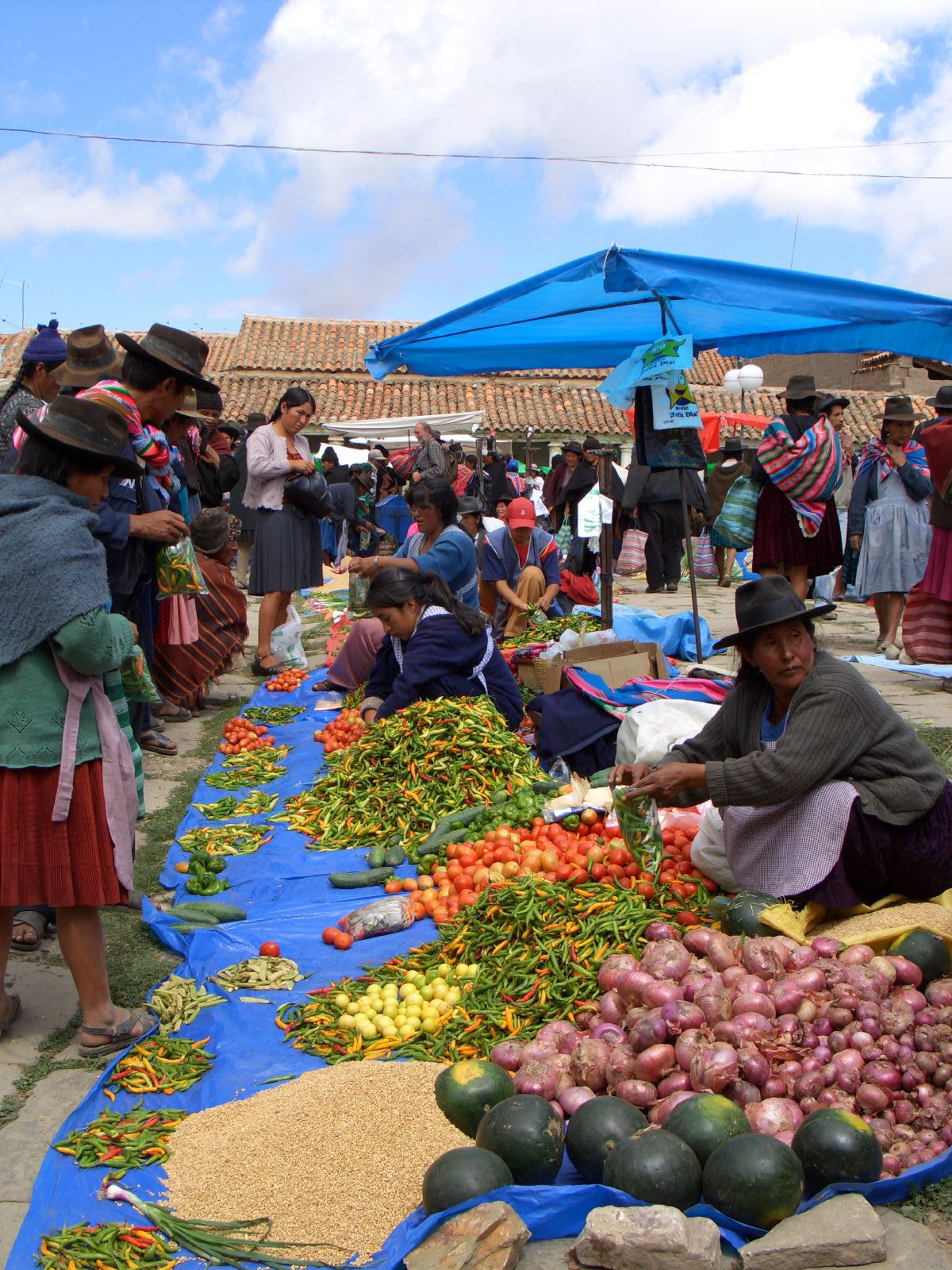
Fresh produce at the market in Tarabuco

Soybeans were the most lucrative legal cash crop in Bolivia in the 1980s. Soybean production began in earnest in the early 1970s, following a substantial increase in the crop's world price. By the late 1980s, soybeans represented the country's most important oilseed crop. In 1988 soybeans covered 65,000 hectares, and annual production amounted to about 150,000 tons, compared with 19,430 hectares producing 26,000 tons a decade earlier. About one-third of the soybean harvest was used domestically in the form of soybean meal for the poultry industry. Other soybean meal was shipped to Peru and Western Europe, and raw soybeans were exported via rail to Brazil. In order to process soybean oil for the local market, the country maintained a crushing capacity of 150,000 tons in 1988. Locally manufactured soybean oil also competed with contraband products from neighboring countries. Most of Santa Cruz's soybean farmers were members of the wellorganized and powerful National Association of Soybean Producers (Asociación Nacional de Productores de Soya—Anapo). Anapo, with assistance from AID, built new storage facilities that permitted continued expansion of the crop. Because of the dynamism of their crop, soybean farmers enjoyed the best availability of credit for all legal cash-crop producers.

=== Coffee ===
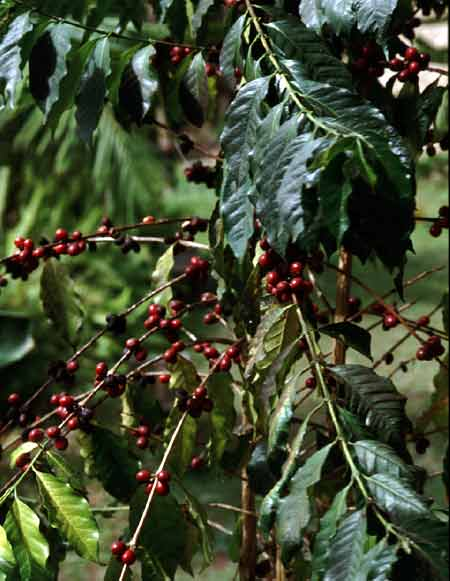
Coffee plant in Bolivia

Coffee, another principal cash crop, was the second most important agricultural export after timber. As the primary substitute crop offered to coca growers under the eradication program, coffee was of particular importance. Coffee production reached 13,000 tons in 1988, nearly double the 1987 output, which was damaged by disease in western Bolivia. Over 20,000 hectares were devoted to coffee and Bolivia consumed 25% of its coffee crop locally in 1988, with the balance exported both legally and clandestinely. Legal exports of 102,000 bags, sixty kilograms each as measured by the International Coffee Organization (ICO), were equivalent to Bolivia's export quota for 1988, which was over US$15 million. An ICO member since 1968, Bolivia was permitted to export 170,000 of the sixty-kilogram bags in 1989. About 25% of coffee exports left the country illegally in the late 1980s. Most coffee was grown by small farmers in the valleys or by large farmers in the lowlands. Most commercial farmers were members of the Bolivian Coffee Committee (Comité Boliviano del Café—Cobolca), which allocated ICO quotas. The coffee industry also received technical assistance from the Bolivian Institute of Coffee (Instituto Boliviano de Café), an autonomous government agency established in 1965 to run model farms and help control disease.

=== Sugar ===
Bolivia had been self-sufficient in sugar production since 1963, although sugarcane had been grown since the colonial era. Sugarcane in the 1980s was a cash crop of significance for both the domestic and the export markets. In 1988 cultivation of sugarcane on 62,000 hectares produced 140,000 tons of sugar, figures which represent a sharp decline from 1986 figures. The price of sugar had skyrocketed in the mid-1970s, doubling the number of hectares under sugarcane cultivation in a few years. As sugar prices declined, however, farmers opted for more lucrative crops, such as soybeans. The decline in the sugar industry also was caused by poor management, dwindling yields, and poor quality control. In 1988 the country's six sugar mills operated at only 37% capacity. Sugarcane also was processed into methanol for the domestic and export markets. Continued controls on imports of sugar constituted one of the few exceptions to the import liberalization policies of the late 1980s.

=== Cotton ===
Although cotton was a boom crop in the early 1970s, production had waned since 1975. Grown mostly in the Santa Cruz Department, cotton covered 54,000 hectares in 1975 but only 9,000 hectares in 1988. Production declined from 22,000 tons to 3,700 tons over the same period. Price was the primary reason for the decline, but insect problems, disease, and the lack of credit also contributed. Because Santa Cruz cotton farmers represented an important constituency, they had traditionally received highly favorable terms of credit. When cotton growing was no longer profitable, however, many cotton farmers defaulted on their loans, leaving the government's Agricultural Bank of Bolivia (Banco Agrícola de Bolivia—BAB) in a poor financial position in the late 1980s. Because of the precipitous decline in the industry, the country's ten cotton mills were operating at under one-half of their capacity by the late 1980s.

Cash crops of lesser importance included tobacco, tea, cocoa, and oilseeds, such as sesame, peanuts, castor beans, and sunflowers. Approximately 1,000 tons of tobacco for the Bolivian market were grown on about 1,000 hectares. Tea was grown as a secondary crop in the Yungas, Alto Beni (Upper Beni), and Santa Cruz areas. 80% of the country's cacao trees, from which cocoa is derived, were grown in the Alto Beni by a network of cooperatives that were increasingly involved in processing cocoa and exporting chocolate products. Oilseeds were an important part of both the agricultural and the manufacturing sectors but the growing dominance of soybeans, however, diminished the role of other oilseeds in the economy.

=== Coca ===
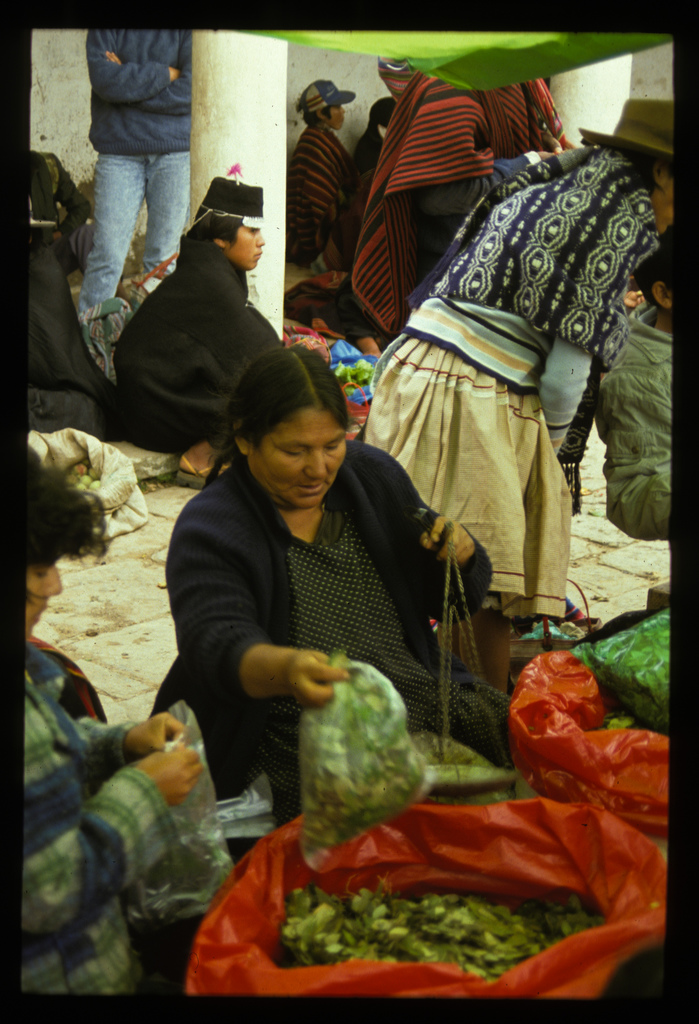
A Bolivian woman selling coca

Bolivia's most lucrative crop and economic activity in the 1980s was coca, whose leaves are notoriously processed clandestinely into cocaine. The country was the second largest grower of coca in the world, supplying about 15% of the United States cocaine market in the late 1980s. Analysts believed that exports of coca paste or cocaine generated from US$600 million to US$1 billion annually in the 1980s, depending on prices and output. Based on these estimates, coca-related exports equaled or surpassed the country's legal exports.

Coca has been grown in Bolivia for centuries. The coca plant, a tea-like shrub, was cultivated mostly by small farmers in the Chapare and Yungas regions. About 65% of all Bolivian coca was grown in the Chapare region of Cochabamba Department; other significant coca-growing areas consisted of the Yungas of La Paz Department and various areas of Santa Cruz and the Tarija Department.

Bolivian farmers rushed to grow coca in the 1980s as its price climbed and the economy collapsed. Soaring unemployment also contributed to the boom. In addition, farmers turned to coca for its quick economic return, its light weight, its yield of four crops a year, and the abundance of United States dollars available in the trade, a valuable resource in a hyperinflated economy. The Bolivian government estimated that coca production had expanded from 1.63 million kilograms of leaves covering 4,100 hectares in 1977 to a minimum of 45 million kilograms over an area of at least 48,000 hectares in 1987. The number of growers expanded from 7,600 to at least 40,000 over the same period. Besides growers, the coca networks employed numerous Bolivians, including carriers (zepeadores), manufacturers of coca paste and cocaine, security personnel, and a wide range of more nefarious positions. The unparalleled revenues made the risk worthwhile for many.

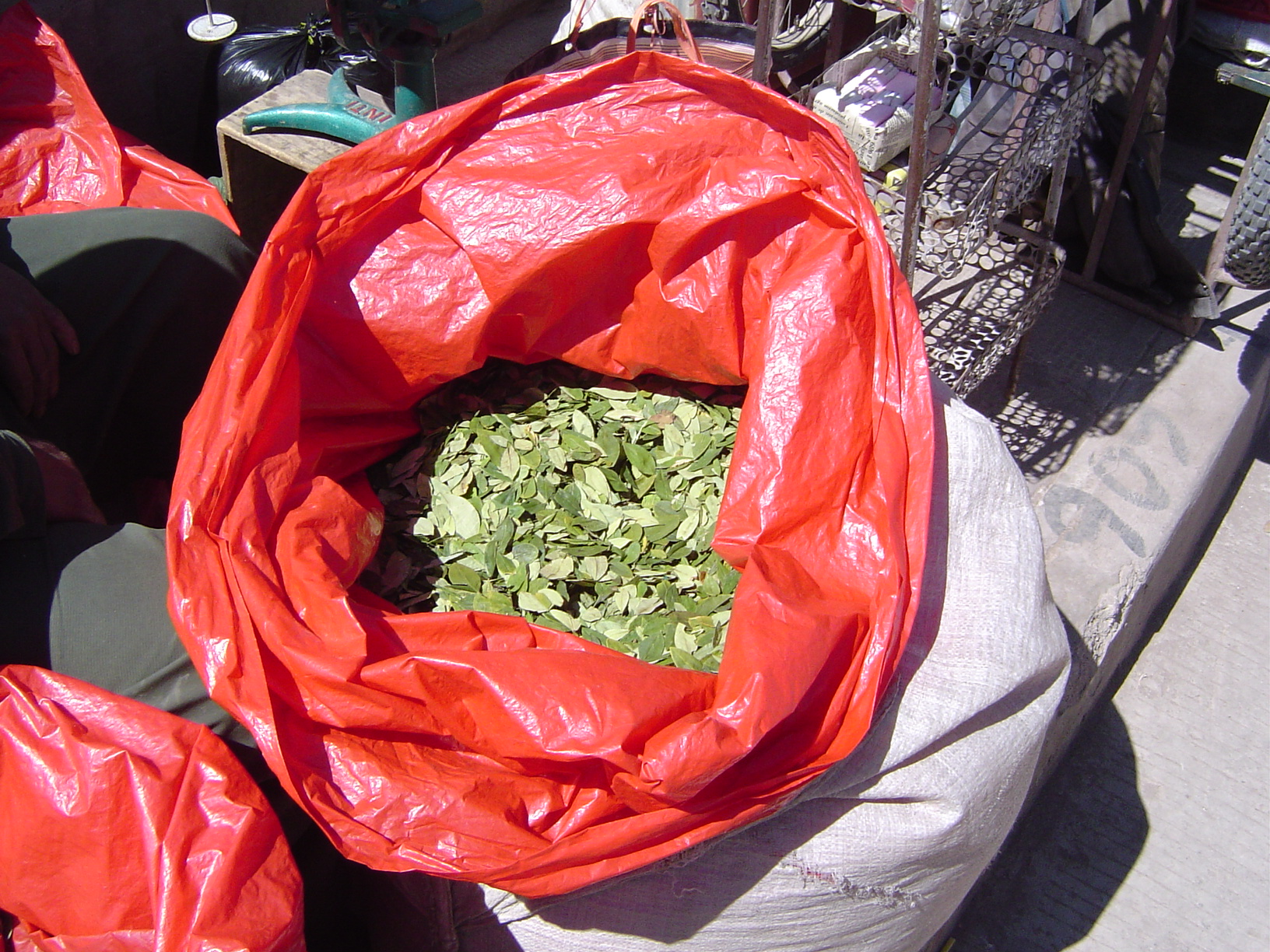
Coca leaves

Government efforts to eradicate the rampant expansion of coca cultivation in Bolivia began in 1983, when Bolivia committed itself to a five-year program to reduce coca production and created the Coca Eradication Directorate (Dirección de la Reconversión de la Coca—Direco) under the Ministry of Agriculture, Campesino Affairs, and Livestock Affairs. Bolivia's National Directorate for the Control of Dangerous Substances (Dirección Nacional para el Control de Substancias Peligrosas—DNCSP) was able to eradicate several thousand hectares of coca. These efforts, however, put only a small dent in the coca industry and were highly controversial among thousands of peasants. Under the joint agreement signed by the United States and Bolivia in 1987, which created DNCSP, Bolivia allocated US$72.2 million for the 1988 to 1991 period to eradication programs, including a wide-ranging rural development program for the Chapare region. The program was aided by an 88% drop in the local price of coca caused by the fall in cocaine prices in the United States.

The economics of eradication were particularly frustrating. As more coca was destroyed, the local price increased, making it more attractive to other growers. Bolivia, however, was seeking additional funds from the United States and Western Europe to proceed with an eradication plan that was supposed to provide peasants US$2,000 per hectare eradicated. In 1988 coca growing became technically illegal outside a specially mandated 12,000- hectare area in the Yungas. A four-year government eradication campaign begun in 1989 sought to convert 55% of coca areas into legal crops. Coffee and citrus fruits were offered as alternative crops to coca despite the fact that their return was a fraction of that of coca.

The cocaine industry had a generally deleterious effect on the Bolivian economy not to mention having a serious environmental impact on rivers and removal of forest for coca plantations. The cocaine trade greatly accelerated the predominance of the United States dollar in the economy and the large black market for currency, thereby helping to fuel inflation in the 1980s. The escalation of coca cultivation also damaged the output of fruits and coffee, which were mostly destined for local consumption. Coca's high prices, besides being generally inflationary, also distorted other sectors, especially labor markets. Manufacturers in the Cochabamba area during the 1980s found it impossible to match the wages workers could gain in coca, making their supply of labor unreliable and thus harming the formal economy.

== Livestock ==
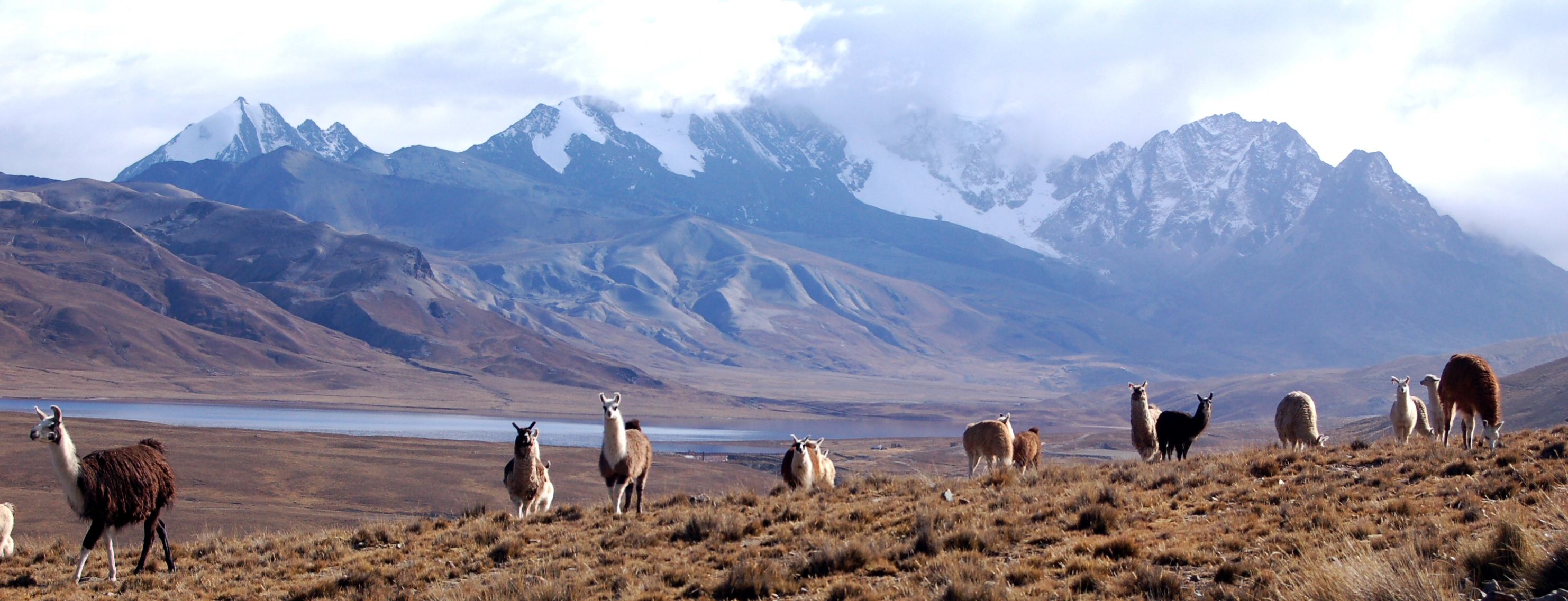
Llamas on the Bolivian altiplano.

Livestock production was active and well diversified. Beef cattle numbered an estimated 6 million in 1988 and dominated all livestock production, being the most popular meat in Bolivia. Unlike the rest of the agricultural sector, beef output grew over 4% a year during the 1980s. Over 70% of all cattle were raised in the eastern plains; Beni was responsible for over 40% of the national herd. 20% of all cattle were found in the valleys and about 10% in the highlands, where they had served as beasts of burden since the Spanish introduced cattle in colonial times. In 1988 Bolivia slaughtered 200,000 tons of cattle and exported 48,000 live cattle to Brazil, as well as processed beef to Chile and Peru. The country's medium and large cattle ranchers were organized into two large producer associations one in Beni and one in Santa Cruz that marketed beef and attempted to set domestic prices. Bolivia had the potential to double its beef output in a relatively short period of time.

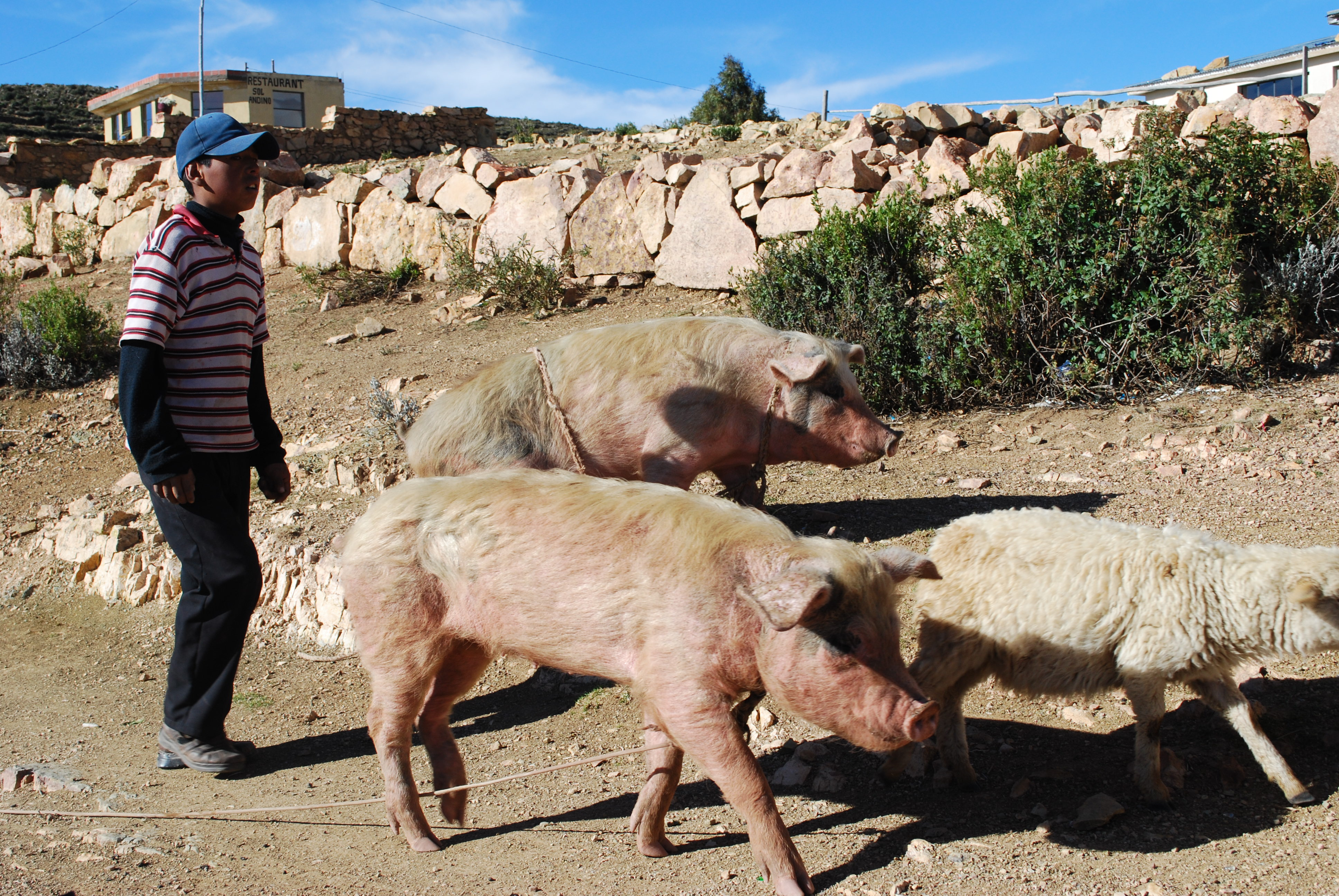
A Bolivian livestock farmer

The number of dairy cattle in Bolivia in the late 1980s was unknown but was well below what the country needed to meet domestic demand. The rate of milk consumption among Bolivians was among the lowest in the world. In 1988 Bolivia consumed 130,000 tons of milk, 80,000 tons from its five dairies, 23,000 tons in donations from developed countries, and the rest in contraband, mostly in the form of evaporated milk. Dairy farms were medium to large in size and were concentrated in Cochabamba and Santa Cruz departments. The government was involved heavily in the dairy industry, but it was generally ineffective in improving nutritional levels in dairy products.

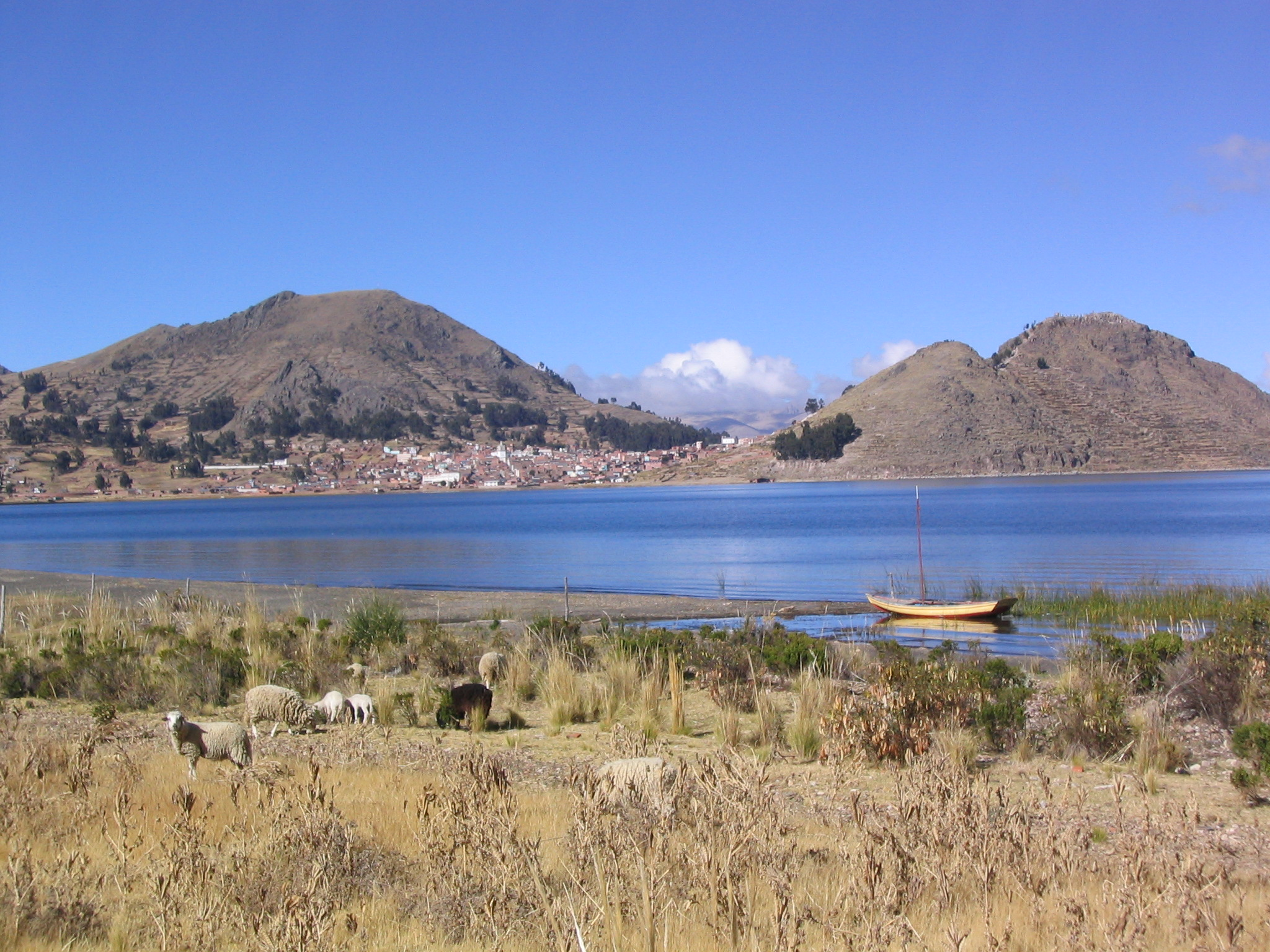
Cattle on a farm near Copacabana

Other livestock included chickens, pigs, sheep, goats, llamas, alpacas, vicuñas, and even buffalo. Chicken production also was centered in Cochabamba and Santa Cruz departments and experienced strong growth in the 1980s. Although the poultry industry faced high feed costs and substantial Chilean contraband, it produced 25 million broilers and 200 million eggs in 1988. The pork industry, also facing high feed costs, remained small. These high feed costs can be attributed to the increase in production using technology such as tractors, that substantially take a toll on the fertility of the soil and therefore the growth of natural vegetation. The pig population was estimated at slightly over 1 million, and the annual slaughter was roughly 45,000 tons of pork. Santa Cruz was expected to be the location of the pork industry's future growth. There were an estimated 10 million sheep and 1 million goats in Bolivia, mostly in the highlands, which was also home to 3 million llamas, 350,000 alpacas, and a dwindling number of vicuñas. Appreciated for their fine wool and meat, llamas, alpacas, and vicuñas received government protection because of their declining numbers.

== Labor practices ==
In 2013, the U.S. Department of Labor reported that children engage in child labor in the agricultural sector. Agriculture is a sector where instances of such working conditions are most common in Bolivia. In fact, 70% of children aged 7 to 14 years old work in the agricultural sector. In 2014, the Bureau of International Labor Affairs issued a List of Goods Produced by Child Labor or Forced Labor where Bolivia was classified as a country that resorts to child labor in the production of chestnuts, corn, peanuts and sugarcane.

== Forestry and fishing ==
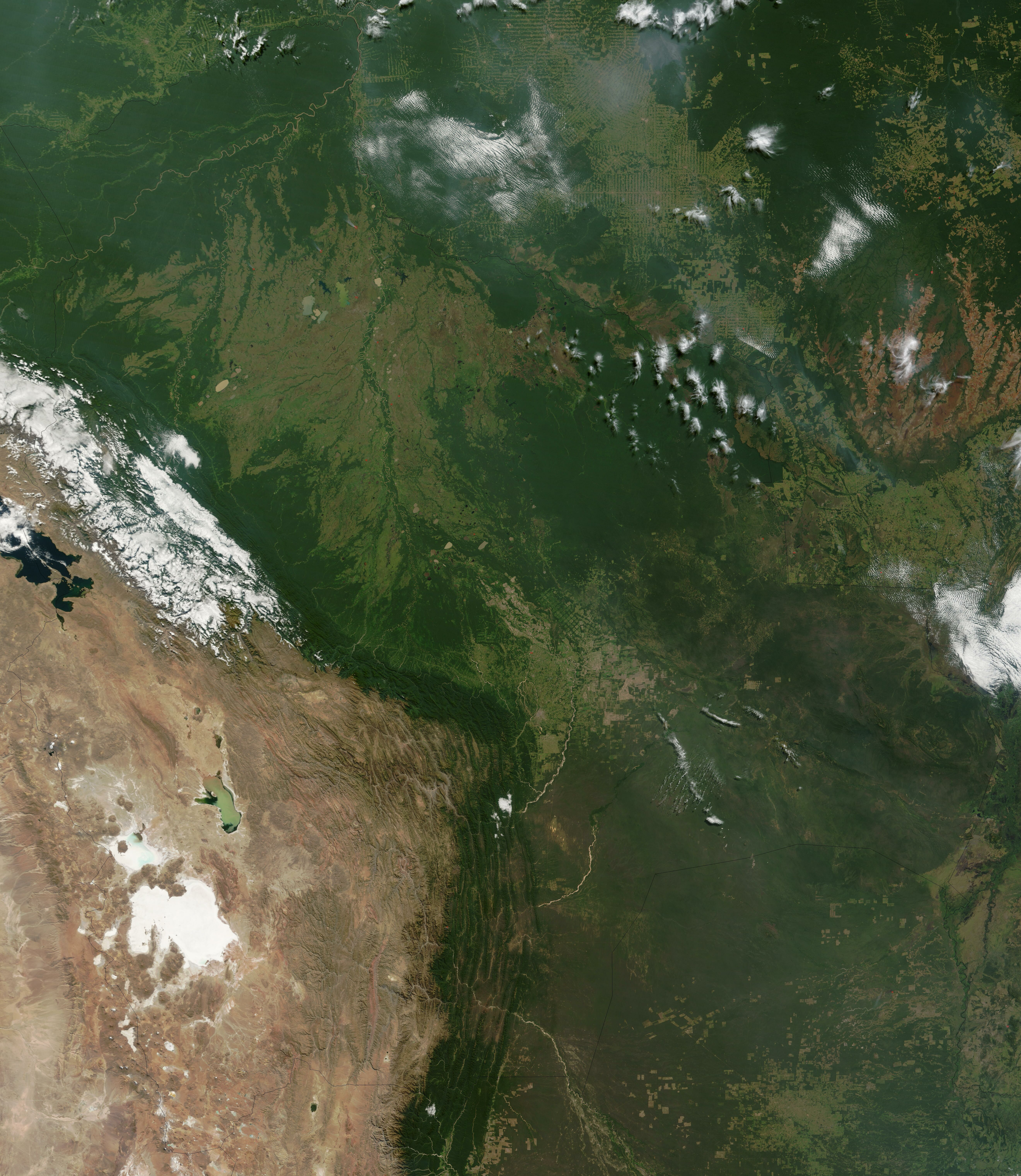
Deforestation occurring in Bolivia's forest regions

Bolivia's vast forests and woodlands were one of the areas with the most potential for growth in agriculture. Official wood production grew by a third from the late 1970s to the late 1980s, when timber exports surpassed all other agricultural exports. Timber exports in 1987 reached US$31 million. Contraband in wood products, however, was expected to be equivalent to official exports. Most of the smuggled wood was destined for Brazil. Bolivia's eastern lowlands are richly endowed with hundreds of species of trees, scores of which have been commercially timbered. Deforestation and the threat of erosion caused by slash-and-burn agriculture and colonization were growing concerns in the lowlands. The government's Center for Forestry Development (Centro de Desarrollo Forestal) monitored the country's forests.

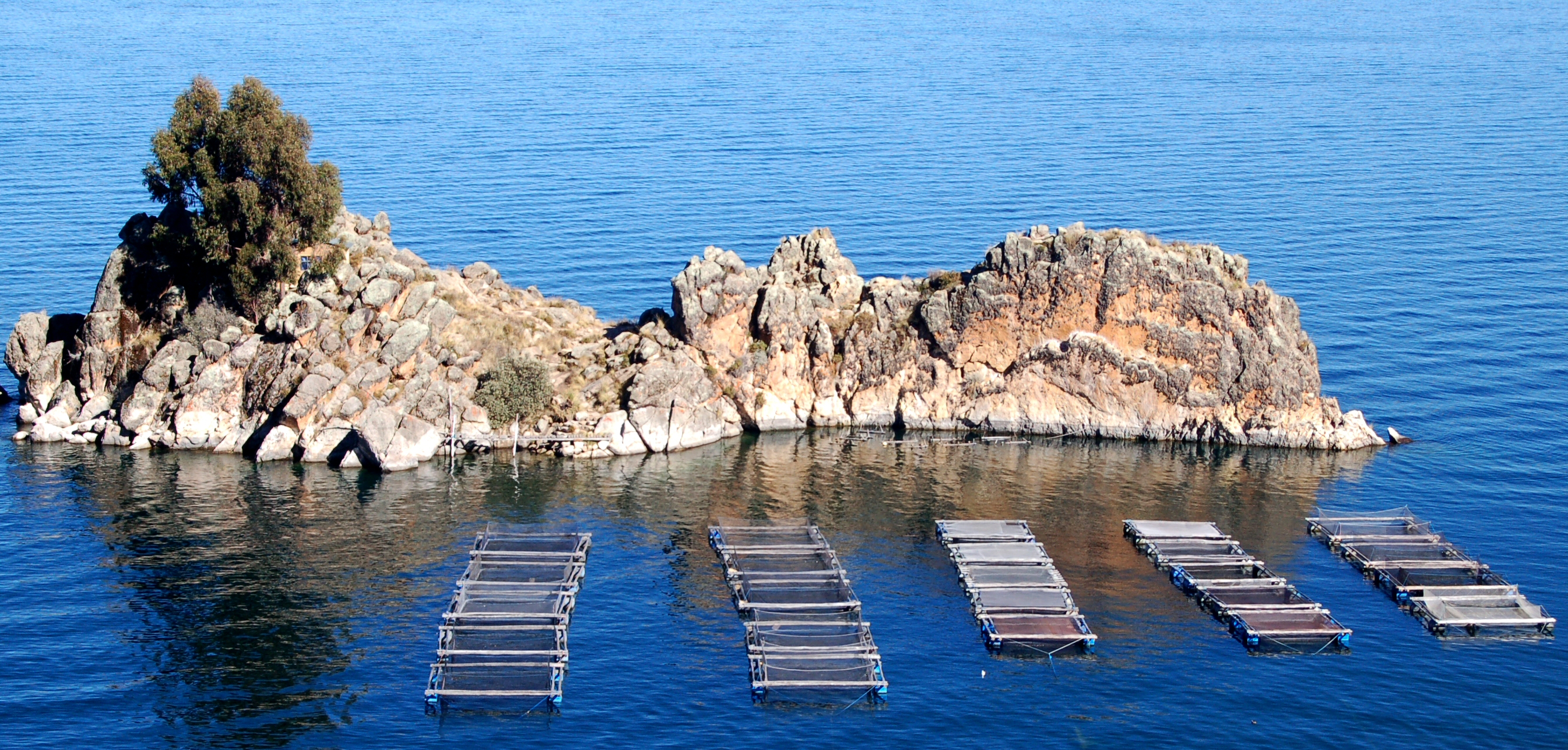
Fish farming on Lake Titicaca

Fish was a potential source of protein in the Bolivian's protein-deficient diet, but river fishing was mostly for direct consumption. With assistance from the British, the government was attempting to promote commercial fishing in the lowlands. Several processing plants were being considered to market the trout, pacú, and dorados that filled the many rivers of the Oriente.

== Land tenure ==
Before the 1952 Revolution, Bolivia's land distribution was the worst in Latin America with some 4% of all landowners possessing more than 82% of the land. A major success of the land reform program was the redistribution of nearly 50% of peasant lands within its first two years. Although greatly improved from the pre-revolutionary period, broad disparities in land tenure remained in the 1980s. Analysts estimated that over 90% of the farms in the highlands and valleys remained under twenty hectares in the 1980s. These farms typically were one to three hectares in size and were worked by nearly 80% of Bolivia's more than 700,000 farmers. The majority of farmers in the highlands were also members of agricultural cooperatives. Only 40% of the farms in the eastern and northern lowlands were under twenty hectares; the most common size in that region was fifty to seventy-five hectares, but subsistence farming existed as well.

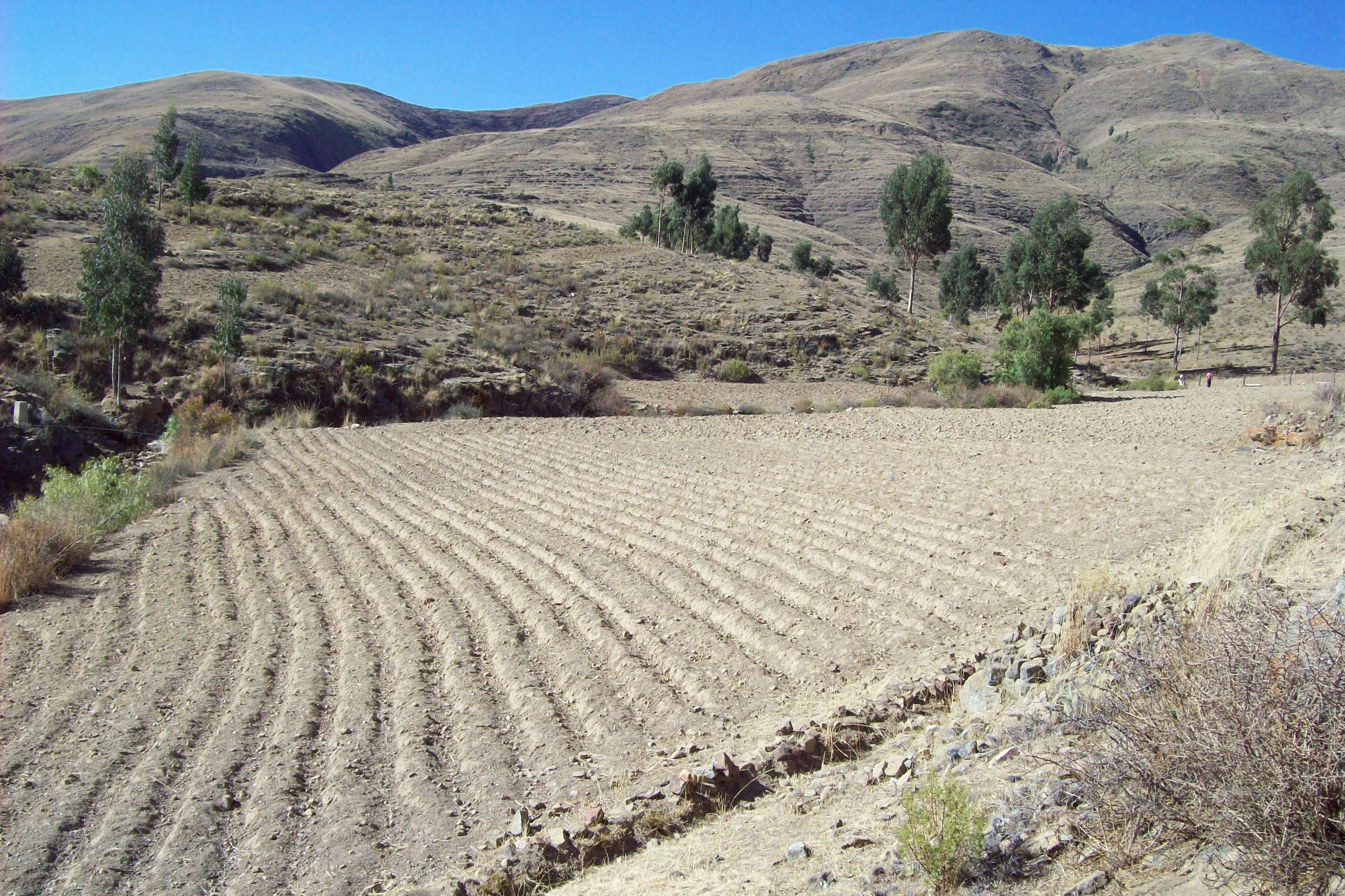
A dry corn field with little fertility in the Altiplano.

Nearly 60% of all farmers lived in the highlands in the late 1980s. Highland parcels were the smallest in the country, had the least fertile soils, and had been worked for the longest period of time. Highland farmers received under 40% of all rural income, although they represented about 60% of the rural population.

20% of the country's farmers were located in the relatively fertile valleys. These farmers fared much better than their Altiplano counterparts on the high plateau (Altiplano) between the two mountain ranges in western Bolivia. Plots averaged between five and ten hectares, and because of the more fertile and less exhausted soils, a larger share of that land was in use compared with the Altiplano. Farmers in the valleys were frequently able to harvest two crops annually, as opposed to the one crop a year on the Altiplano.

The largest farms were found on the sprawling and often isolated eastern lowlands, where about 20% of the country's farmers worked 65% of the country's land. The lowlands produced the bulk of all agricultural output and virtually all of the sector's exports. Although about 16% of the lowland farms were of subsistence size (five hectares or fewer), the great majority of the region's land was owned by medium-to-large landowners actively engaged in commercial agriculture. The power center of the agricultural sector was located in the southeastern department of Santa Cruz, where landholdings often exceeded 5,000 hectares.

== Land reform and land policy ==
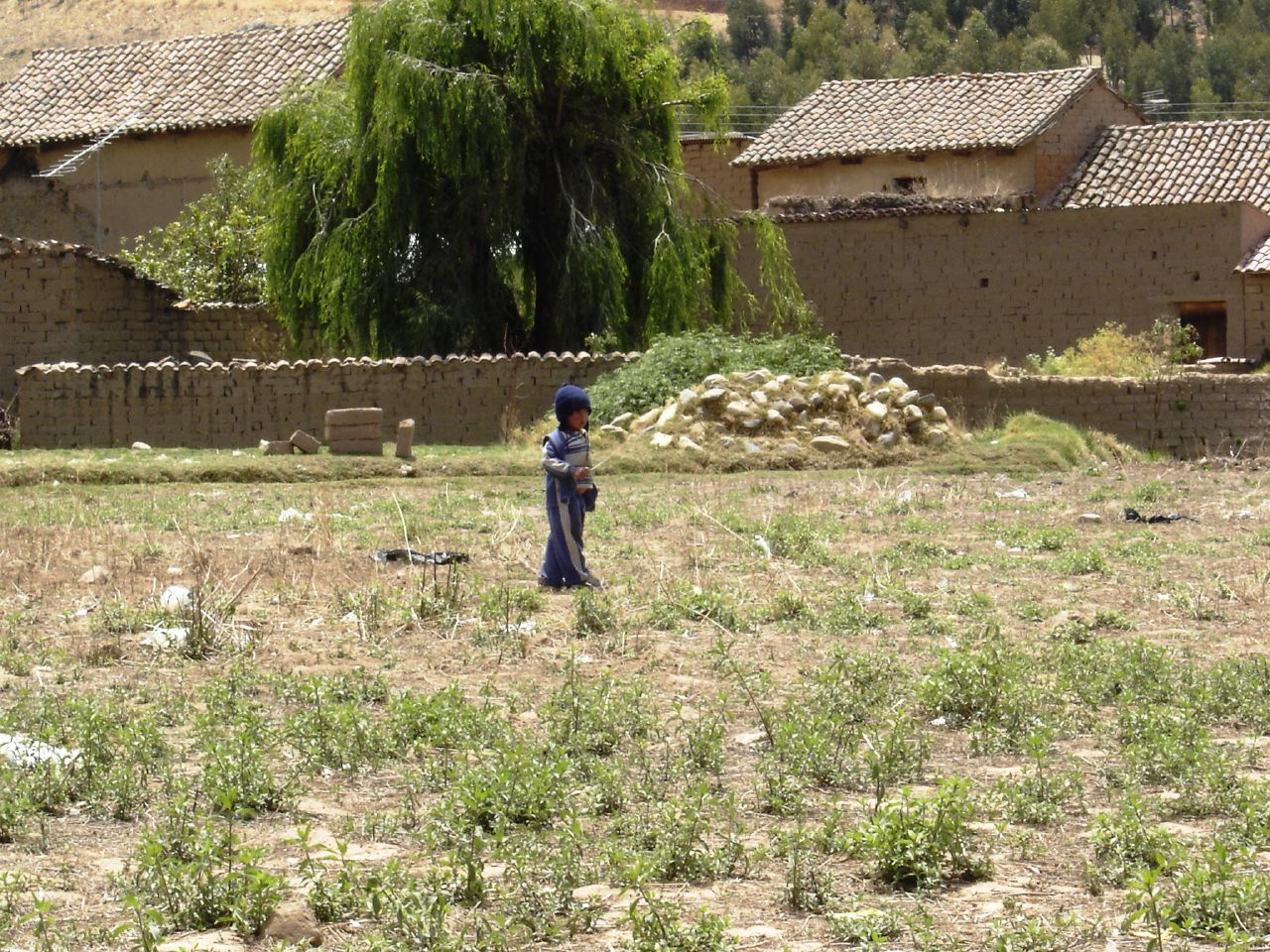

Bolivia's land reform policies of the early 1950s were implemented much more rapidly and completely than those of other Latin American countries. The land reform essentially allowed peasants to claim the land that they had traditionally worked. For this reason, however, the size of many peasant plots did not increase as a result of the reform.

In retrospect, land reform was more of a social success than an economic one. Although the reform improved income distribution, its main contribution was to transform a feudal society into a market society. Land reform has remained a goal of successive governments since 1952, but the pace and scope of reform slowed. The original Agrarian Reform Law was amended in 1963 and 1968. By 1986 the government claimed to have redistributed 33 million hectares through the reform process. But although peasants ate better, agricultural production did not increase in the way most government officials expected. In addition, the reform process was hampered by price controls, a lack of extension services, inadequate credit, insufficient infrastructure, and regional conflicts between the highlands and lowlands. The growth of the agricultural sector was barely positive during the 1950s, and annual growth, especially among food crops, did not keep pace with population growth, thus requiring increased imports of foodstuffs.

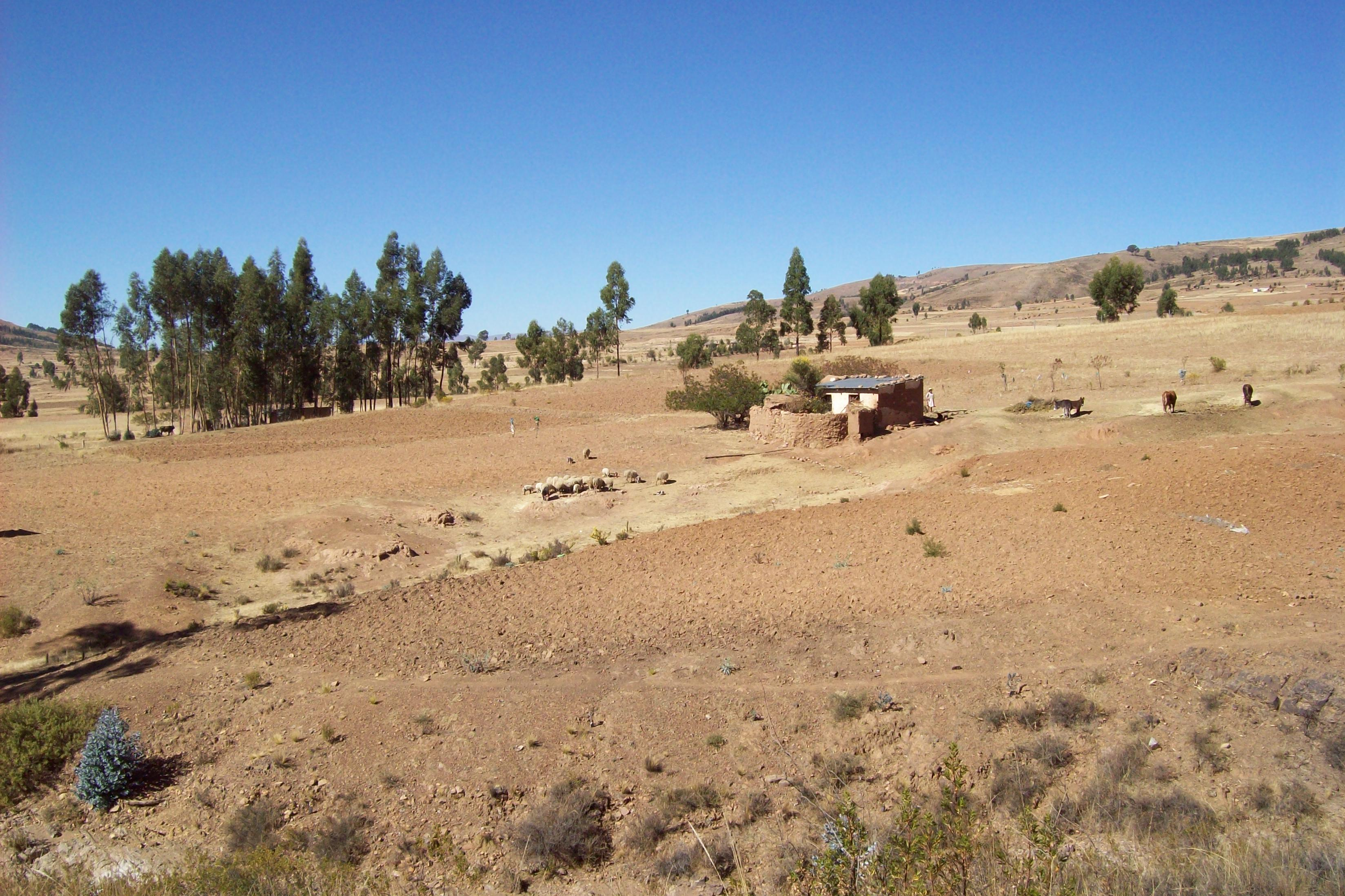
A farm on the altiplano, producing wheat and potatoes but also sheep.

Land policy since 1952 also has been marked by the colonization of the lowlands. Although government policy has encouraged colonization of these isolated areas since the 1940s, the process did not accelerate until the 1950s, when a major highway connected Cochabamba with Santa Cruz and a rail system linked Santa Cruz with São Paulo, Brazil. The settlers included members of the former ruling oligarchy who had lost land in the reform, as well as more risk-taking highlanders, or Kollas, who came as wage laborers or who bought land. In order to facilitate the colonization process, the government created the National Colonization Institute (Instituto Nacional de Colonización—INC), which typically helped highland families move to newly established government colonies, sometimes completely isolated from other towns. From 1952 to the mid-1970s, the government helped 46,000 families (190,000 people) colonize the lowlands. Government-sponsored colonization, however, accounted for just 15% of all the pioneers who ventured east. Furthermore, INC colonies suffered a high dropout rate among participants, many of whom faulted the INC for providing insufficient support services and too few roads. Other settlers included members of Japanese and North American Mennonite communities who were establishing colonies in neighboring Paraguay.

Land policy and government agricultural policy in general shifted dramatically when orthodox economic policies were implemented in 1985. The government, which had once monopolized the production of many key crops, set prices, marketed goods, and closely controlled credit, now effectively withdrew from the sector. As a result, farmers in the late 1980s were in transition from a period characterized by import protection and close cooperation with the government to one of free competition with highly advanced international markets and contraband.

== Land use ==
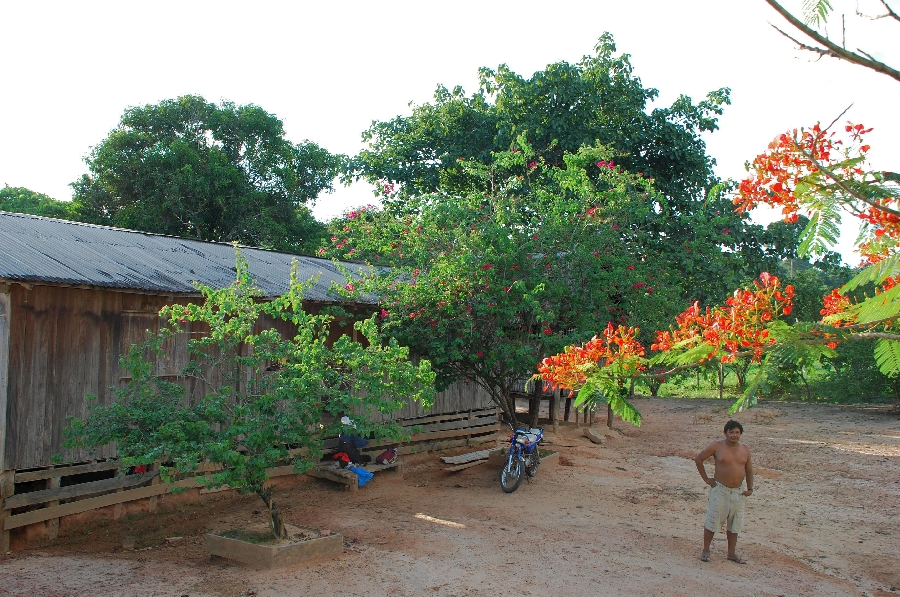
North Bolivia Plantation

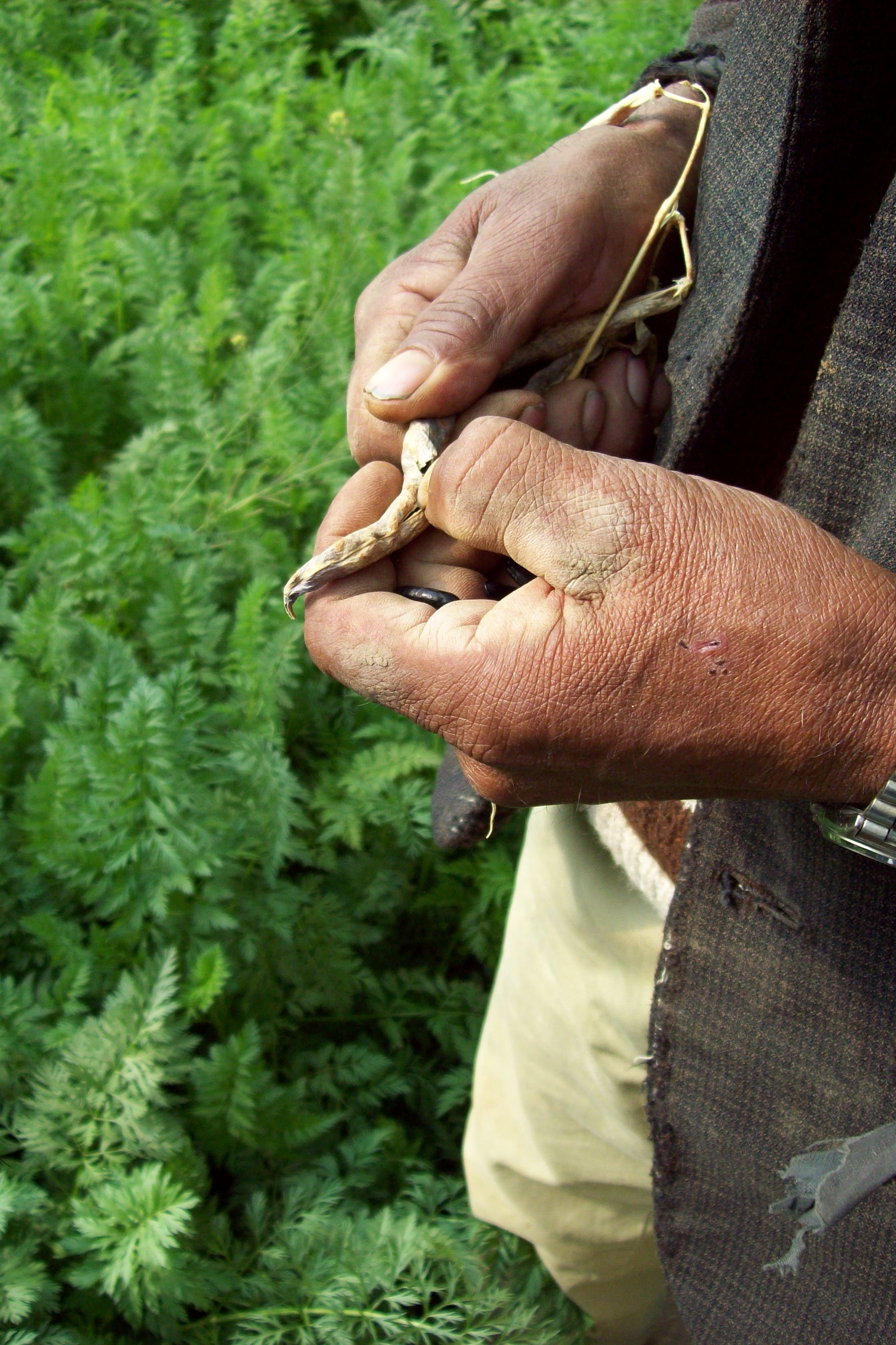
A produce farmer examining beans grown in a greenhouse

Bolivia contains slightly over 108 million hectares of land. Forest or woodland comprised 40% of all land, or 56 million hectares, in the late 1980s. Pasture accounted for a quarter of total land, or about 27 million hectares. Crops covered only 2% of all land, or over 1 million hectares. The remaining 30% of the land was destined for "other uses", including 8% of all land that was arable but not in use. Of the land deemed suitable for agricultural use, only about 10% was in use.

As with land tenure, the country's land use was best explained in terms of its geography. Most highland farmers worked minifundia plots of staples and vegetables, such as potatoes, corn, haba beans, and quinoaa, the Bolivian cereal grain, selling only 30% of their output. Produce usually was marketed to truckers, the most common marketing outlet for Bolivian farmers, or was sold at large agricultural fairs, an Inca custom. Although Indians in the highlands terraced their steep fields in the Inca style, traditional farming techniques also made farmers vulnerable to frost, irregular rainfall, and erosion. Farm animals plowed the soil, and the abundance of sheep, llamas, and alpaca, used as a form of insurance income against bad weather, made overgrazing common, thus further eroding the soil and lessening soil fertility.

Farmers in the valleys used their farmland for a mixture of traditional and nontraditional purposes, producing both food and cash crops. The primary food crops were tubers, barley, corn, wheat, fruits, and vegetables. Export crops such as cacao, tea, and coffee were also planted, the latter because of the ideal altitude. Livestock activity also was common. Although yields were not always high, the valleys usually produced two crops a year and were less vulnerable to weather fluctuations than on the Altiplano. Nevertheless, farmers in the valleys also relied on truckers for their marketing and suffered greater isolation than those on the Altiplano, particularly during the rainy season, October to April. Although farmers in the valleys took more risks than those on the Altiplano, they still suffered from a low technological level and the lack of direct access to markets.

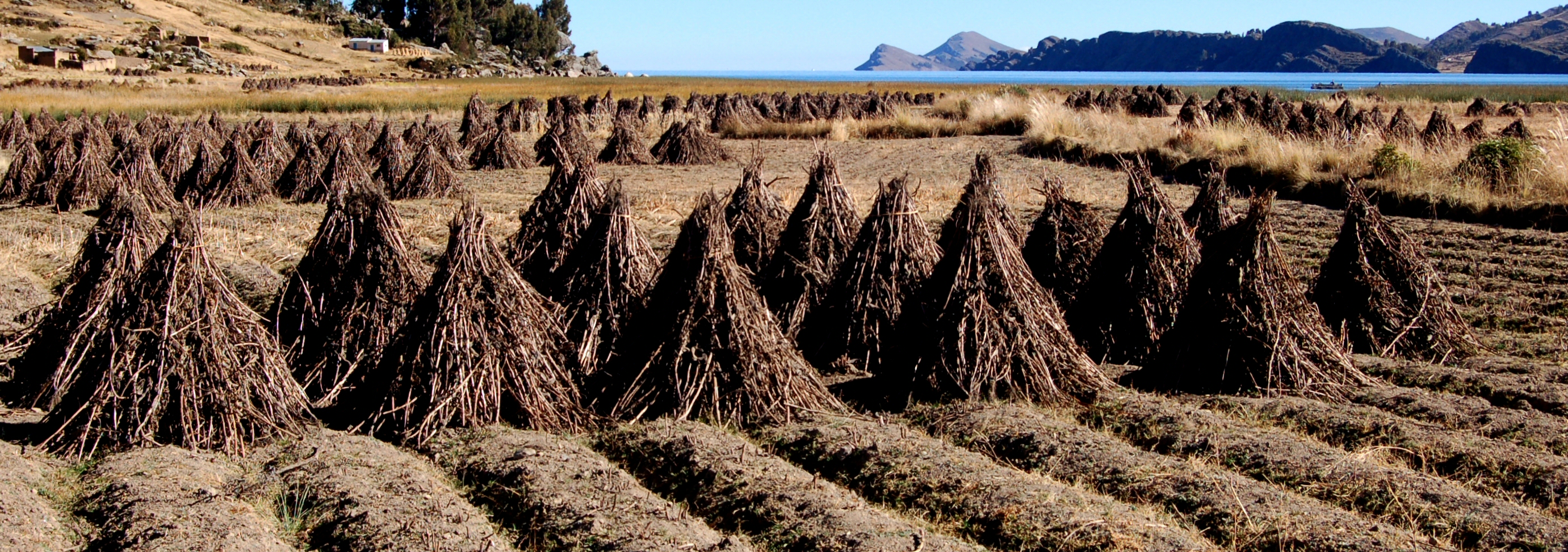
Haystacks

The country's most productive farmers were those who cultivated the fertile plains of the lowlands, especially in the department of Santa Cruz. Santa Cruz's rise to prominence was the consequence of infrastructure improvements in the 1950s, land reform, and colonization. By the 1960s, Santa Cruz was responsible for the import substitution industrialization of sugar, rice, cotton, and oilseeds. With the rapid increase in commodity prices in the early 1970s, cruceña (Santa Cruz region) lands were increasingly sown with cash crops, especially cotton and soybeans. For political reasons, Santa Cruz also received a disproportionate share of the sector's credit in the 1970s, which also accelerated growth. In contrast to the rest of the country, farmers in Santa Cruz were actively engaged in all aspects of the market economy, such as harvesting, processing, marketing, and even research and development. These farmers were organized into powerful producer organizations that traditionally negotiated prices with the government and provided technical assistance to members. Small farmers also continued to occupy Santa Cruz and many were responsible for the growing problems of deforestation because of slash-and-burn approaches to rice farming. An estimated 100,000 landless wage earners in the agricultural sector cut sugarcane or picked cotton in Santa Cruz or performed seasonal labor in Argentina.

The northern lowland departments of Pando and Beni were much more isolated than Santa Cruz, thus limiting their ability to be major agricultural producers. They were originally settled in the late 19th century during a boom in rubber exports from the Amazon region. As colonization proceeded, larger-scale commercial agriculture developed in coffee, rice, and especially cattle. By the 1960s, large cattle ranches of 500 hectares and more flourished in Beni, making it the cattle capital of the country. In the 1980s, Beni Department also became an important producer of commercial timber.

== Farming technology ==
The use of purchased items such as fertilizers, tractors, and irrigation systems were extremely low in the 1980s because traditional farming methods continued to dominate. Because of their isolation and lack of technical support, Bolivian farmers used less fertilizer, about two kilograms per hectare, than any other country in the Western Hemisphere. Most small farmers used natural fertilizers, such as manure, but even large farms in Santa Cruz found chemical fertilizers (all of which were imported) expensive because of transportation costs. The signing of an accord for a natural gas pipeline with Brazil in 1988, however, improved Bolivia's prospects for manufacturing its own chemical fertilizers. Bolivia's use of tractors, 0.2 per 1,000 hectares, was also the lowest in the Western Hemisphere. Most tractors were used in Santa Cruz. As the lowlands took on a greater role in agriculture, that ratio was expected to improve. By the late 1980s, just about 5% of the country's land was irrigated, one-third more than a decade earlier.

Government extension services for farmers remained extremely inadequate in the late 1980s. Only one agricultural agent existed for each 7,000 farming households. The chief research institution for agriculture was the Bolivian Institute for Agricultural Technology (Instituto Boliviano de Tecnología Agrícola—IBTA). Established in the mid-1970s, the IBTA concentrated mainly on new seed varieties for cash crops in the lowlands. The Institute for the Rural Development of the Altiplano (Instituto para el Desarrollo Rural del Altiplano—IDRA), the Center for Tropical Agricultural Research (Centro de Investigaciones de Agricultura Tropical—CIAT), and the national universities performed further research into this field.

== Irrigation development ==
=== Irrigation infrastructure ===
Bolivia has approximately 226,500 irrigated hectares (ha) or about 11% of the total agricultural land 2,100,000 ha. There are about 5,000 irrigation systems in Bolivia, most of them located in the South and Southwestern areas (Valles and Antiplano). These irrigation systems consist of rudimentary web of canals supplied by rainfall with few regulatory schemes such as dams, which makes them very vulnerable to seasonality of rain. Overall efficiency of irrigation systems varies from 18 to 30% in traditional systems to 35-50% in improved systems.

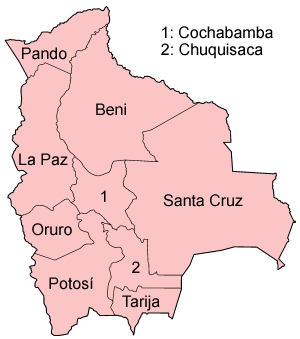
Map of the departments of Bolivia

Irrigation systems by department, size and area

Department	Micro (10ha)	Small (100ha)	Medium (500ha)	Big (>500ha)	Total
Chuquisaca	1,653	11,370	4,261	3,884	21,168
Cochabamba	1,938	22,225	27,403	35,968	81,925
La Paz	1,703	21,047	6,052	7,192	35,994
Oruro	940	3,638	440	9,021	14,039
Potosi	3,240	10,146	2,254	600	16,240
Santa Cruz	269	5,456	8,434	1,080	15,239
Tarija	785	12,755	17,101	5,710	36,351
Total	10,528	86,638	65,944	63,454	226,564

Source: Ministerio del Agua

=== Linkages with water resources ===
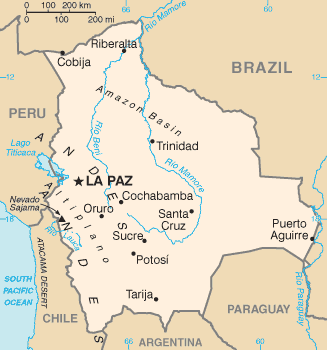
Map of Bolivia from the CIA World Factbook

Irrigation accounts for 94% of water withdrawals or about 2,000 million cubic meters annually. Bolivia can be divided into three areas, which correspond to the eastern area (a tropical and subtropical region), the western area (the arid, semi arid and sub-humid dry region), and the Titicaca basin. The hydrographic system consists of three large basins: the Amazon Basin which measures approximately 724,000 km2 and covers 66% of Bolivia's territory; the closed (endorheic) basin, which measures 145,081 km2 or 13% of the territory; and the Rio Plata Basin, which covers 229,500 km2 or 21% of the nation's territory. The Amazon basin has a high flow of water and it is prone to floods. The quantity and quality of hydrological information is very poor.

=== Environmental impacts of irrigation ===
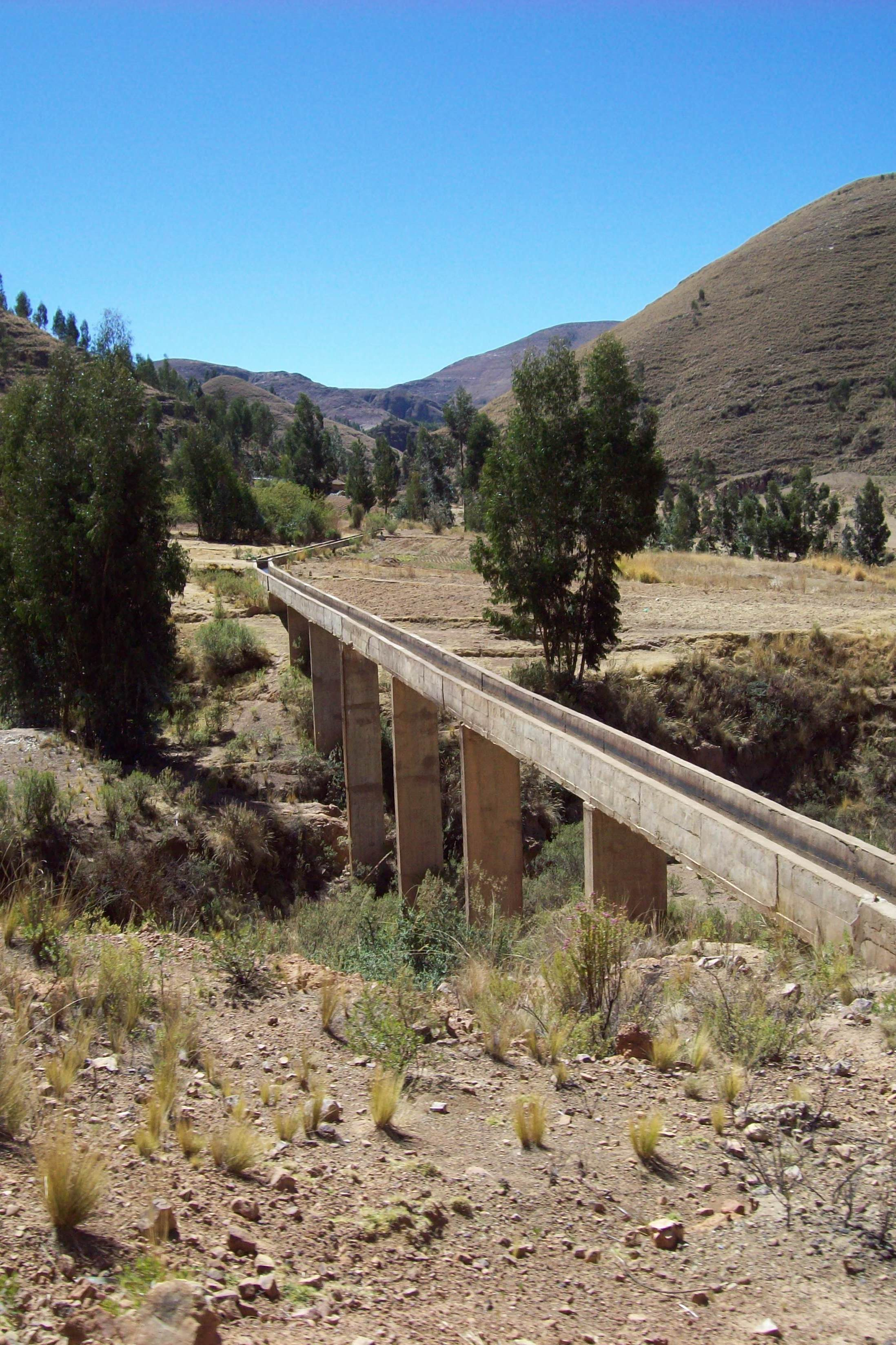
An irrigation canal in Bolivia

The main impacts of irrigated agriculture in Bolivia are soil erosion and pollution due to agricultural runoff. Nearly 41% of Bolivia's national territory has lost its production capacity due to soil erosion. For example, in western regions of Oruro, Potosi and Tarija, close to 45,000 square kilometers have low soil productivity on account of erosion. The highland minifundios accelerate soil degradation processes. In the northern highlands, the production area of family agricultural production units is three to five hectares. Excess grazing and other agricultural activities have contributed to salinization and soil compression.

Agricultural runoff is one of the main contributors to water pollution in Bolivia, together with domestic municipal wastewater and dumping by industries and mines. The greatest percentage of the pollution load is due to diffuse dumping from agricultural and fishing activities and runoffs of urban areas. There are no regulations or controls over major dumping from non-specific sources, despite its volume and toxicity.

In 2017, the Ministry of Environment and Water began developing a National Strategy for Wastewater Management and Reuse to tackle water pollution, public health issues, and promote reuse in line with a circular economy concept. The Global Water Security & Sanitation Partnership (GWSP), part of the World Bank, has been assisting in this strategy's formulation.

From 2017 to 2019, the GWSP backed three government priorities: ensuring water supply sustainability for climate change resilience, treating and reusing wastewater for water quality, and learning from other Latin American countries on water issues. These priorities were part of four World Bank loans totaling almost $400 million for the water sector. The government has since switched focus from irrigation and rural access to urban water and sanitation and the other two projects were dropped.

== Works cited ==
- Hudson, Rex A.; Hanratty, Dennis Michael, eds. (1991). Bolivia: a country study. Washington, D.C.: Federal Research Division, Library of Congress.
