= Asiento Araca =

Town in La Paz Department, Bolivia

Coordinates: 16°49′00″S 67°33′00″W

Asiento Araca is a town in Cairoma Municipality, Loayza Province of La Paz Department, Bolivia.

In 1950 it had about 2,700 inhabitants. It was formerly a tin mining center. The polylepis racemosa tree, a vulnerable species, is endemic to this area in Bolivia.
